= List of Reformed denominations =

The Reformed churches are a group of Protestant denominations connected by a common Calvinist system of doctrine.

== Europe ==
=== Albania ===
- Reformed Church in Durrës mission of the PCA
- Emmanuel reformed church in Tirana

=== Armenia ===
- Congregational Churches in Armenia

=== Austria ===
- Reformed Church in Austria
- Evangelical Reformed Church (Westminster Confession)

=== Azerbaijan ===
- International Presbyterian Church, Baku

=== Belarus ===
- Belarusian Evangelical Reformed Church

=== Belgium ===
- United Protestant Church in Belgium

=== Bulgaria ===
- Union of Evangelical Congregational Churches in Bulgaria

=== Croatia ===
- The Reformed Christian Calvinist Church in Croatia was part of the Hungarian Reformed Church. It is a member of the World Communion of Reformed Churches.
- The Protestant Reformed Christian Church in Croatia is an Anglican church which split from the Reformed Christian Calvinist Church in Croatia in 2001.

=== Cyprus ===
- Greek Evangelical Church
- Trinity Community Christian Fellowship in Larnaca, Cyprus

=== Czech Republic ===
- Evangelical Church of Czech Brethren
- Church of the Brethren in the Czech Republic or Evangelical Brethren Church in the Czech Republic - Czech Republic and Slovakia

=== Denmark ===
- Reformed Synod of Denmark
- German Reformed of Copenhagen
- Reformed Congregation in Fredericia

=== Finland ===
- Christ Church of Oulu

=== France ===
In France, the Calvinist Protestants were called Huguenots. The Reformed Church of France survived under persecution from 1559 until the Edict of Nantes (1598), the effect of which was to establish regions in which Protestants could live unmolested. These areas became centers of political resistance under which the Calvinist church was protected until 1628, when La Rochelle, the Protestant center of resistance to Louis XIII, was overrun by a French army blockade. After the Protestant resistance failed, the Reformed Church of France reorganized, and was guaranteed toleration under the Edict of Nantes until the final revocation of toleration in 1685 (Edict of Fontainebleau). The periods of persecution scattered French Reformed refugees to England, Germany, Switzerland, Netherlands, Africa (especially South Africa), and America. Louis XVI granted an edict of toleration. Freedom of religion came with the French Revolution. Napoleon organized state controlled French Reformed church with the Organic Articles in 1802. A free (meaning, not state controlled) synod of the Reformed Church emerged in 1848 and survives in small numbers to the present time. The French refugees established French Reformed churches in the Latin countries and in America.

The first Calvinist churches in France produced the Gallic Confession and French Calvinist confession of faith, which served as models for the Belgic Confession of Faith (1563).

Today, about 300,000 people are members of the Reformed Church of France (now United Protestant Church of France). There is also the smaller Protestant Reformed Church of Alsace and Lorraine and the more conservative National Union of Independent Reformed Evangelical Churches of France (the name of the denomination was changed in 2009).

The Malagazy Protestant Church in France is a Calvinist denomination whose members come from Madagascar. The Union of Free Evangelical Churches in France is another denomination.

=== Germany ===
The German Reformed Church (Reformierte Kirche) forms, together with German Lutheran and united Protestant churches, the umbrella named Protestant Church in Germany (German: Evangelische Kirche in Deutschland) or EKD. The member churches of EKD were formerly the Protestant state churches in German states before the separation of religion and state in 1919. EKD represents, alongside Catholicism, Germany's "mainstream" religious bodies.

The German Reformed Church, unusually, does not trace its origins back to Zwingli or Calvin, but rather to Philipp Melanchthon, Luther's best friend and closest ally. After Melanchthon's death in 1560, extremist Lutherans (from whom Luther had previously distanced himself) accused Melanchthon's successors in the "Philippist" cause of Crypto-Calvinism and mercilessly persecuted and sometimes killed them in several states, especially Saxony. Other states, such as Hesse(-Cassel), remained openly Philippist and Calvinist. Only during the time of Calvin (1509–1564) himself did genuinely Calvinist influences enter the German Calvinist faith; even today, it remains more Philippist than Calvinist.

In the German Empire (1871–1918) some states were Lutheran, some Reformed. King Frederick William III of Prussia united both major Protestant confessions in his domains into the Prussian Union of churches in 1817, allowing congregations to maintain Lutheran or Calvinist confession, or declare their union, also in Bremen (1877), Hesse-Cassel (1817), and Hesse-Darmstadt (1832) Reformed and Lutherans form a union merely in administration. Some states saw unions of Reformed and Lutherans to a united confession, such as Anhalt (1820 in Anhalt-Bernburg, 1827 in Anhalt-Dessau, and 1880 in Anhalt-Köthen), Baden (1821), Nassau (1817) and Bavarian Palatinate (1848), while Lutherans in other states (Bavaria proper, Hamburg, Hanover, Lübeck, the Mecklenburgs, Oldenburg, Saxon Duchies, Saxony, Schaumburg-Lippe, Schleswig-Holstein, and Württemberg) did not followed suit.

The German Reformed Church's finest hour arguably occurred during the Third Reich (1933–1945): although by far not all Calvinist clergy and their flocks opposed the Nazis, the Reformed Church dominated the Confessing Church resistance against Hitler.

As of 2009, German Protestants come in four different guises, all under one national umbrella, but differentiated by region (Landeskirche, usually regions smaller than the states):

1. Lutheran
2. Calvinist, namely Evangelical Reformed Church in Bavaria and Northwestern Germany (comprising Reformed congregations in all areas, where Lutherans and Reformed did not unite, but Lippe), and Church of Lippe
3. Administration-United - in these churches, each parish is either Lutheran, Reformed or united Protestant, and so is the congregation and the Pastor, but all share the same administration
4. Consensus-United - there is no difference even at the parish level

In Germany, as of 2009, roughly 25 million Germans (less than one-third of the entire population, slightly more than half of German Christians) are Protestant. Of these, less than 2 million are Calvinist. The main coordinating body for Calvinist churches in Germany is the Reformed Alliance.

Smaller, separate denominations include the Evangelical Old-Reformed Church in Lower Saxony, the Union of Evangelical Reformed Churches in Germany, and the episcopally governed Free Reformed Churches of Germany.

=== Great Britain and Ireland ===
The churches with Presbyterian traditions in the United Kingdom have the Westminster Confession of Faith as one of their important confessional documents.

- United Reformed Church (URC) in the United Kingdom is the result of the union of Presbyterian, Congregational and Church of Christ churches
  - Several hundred Congregational churches opted to remain outside the initial 1972 union, forming the Evangelical Fellowship of Congregational Churches and the Congregational Federation. Some congregations were gathered into the Fellowship of Independent Evangelical Churches whilst others are now wholly independent without any national affiliation.
- The Evangelical Presbyterian Church in England and Wales has currently 17 congregations
- The International Presbyterian Church has English and Korean congregations in Great Britain and missions in Romania, Italy and Armenia and in other parts of the world.
- Metropolitan Tabernacle-a famous independent Reformed Baptist congregation pastored by Spurgeon -not a denomination

In Wales, there are the Union of Welsh Independents, which is another congregational body. The Presbyterian Church of Wales is one of the biggest Christian denomination in Wales.

In Scotland, presbyterianism was established in 1560 by John Knox who studied in Geneva and planted Calvinism in his home country. The presbyterian churches in the Canada, Australia, New Zealand trace their origin back primarily from Scotland.

The Presbyterian churches in Scotland, including:

- The Church of Scotland, the established, national church in Scotland
- Free Church of Scotland
- Free Church of Scotland (Continuing)
- United Free Church of Scotland
- Free Presbyterian Church of Scotland
- Reformed Presbyterian Church of Scotland
- Associated Presbyterian Churches
- Didasko

In Ulster, Northern Ireland and The Republic of Ireland spread the Calvinist faith in the 17th century.

- The Reformed Presbyterian Church of Ireland
- The Presbyterian Church in Ireland serves the whole of the island
  - There are also other churches with smaller flocks, notably in Northern Ireland
- The Free Presbyterian Church of Ulster
- The Evangelical Presbyterian Church in Ireland
- Non-subscribing Presbyterian Church of Ireland
- Congregational Union of Ireland

A group of churches called Newfrontiers began in England and also exists elsewhere in the world. This group tends to hold to Calvinist theology, but is also charismatic in its experience.

==== Anglicanism ====
Historically, the Church of England upheld both Lutheran and Calvinist doctrines. Several continental Calvinist theologians moved to England to aid with the doctrinal and liturgical developments there, including Martin Bucer, Peter Martyr, and Jan Łaski. Especially Calvinistic distinctions of the Church of England include the division of the Ten Commandments after the Calvinist numbering (rather than the Lutheran or Catholic division), the iconoclastic reforms of Edward VI and Elizabeth I, and the Eucharistic doctrine of Receptionism. The Church of England so took part in the Synod of Dort, and monarchs since the Glorious Revolution have sworn in the coronation oath to protect the “true profession of the Gospel, and the Protestant Reformed religion established by law.”

However, the ascendency of William Laud to the archbishopric saw a periodic suppression of pro-Calvinist clergymen under Charles I, and the Oxford Movement of the 19th century sought to further distance the Church of England from its Calvinistic ties. Because of the political success of Anglo-Catholicism there have been a few conservative Reformed movements which have left the Church of England:

- The Free Church of England
- The Countess of Huntingdon's Connexion
- The Church of England (Continuing)

=== Greece ===
- Greek Evangelical Church
- Congregational Churches in Greece

=== Hungary ===
The Reformed Church in Hungary, Transylvania and southern Slovakia is one of the largest branches of the Calvinist movement. The Reformed Church is the second largest church in Hungary, it has 4 seminaries in the country (Debrecen, Papa, Budapest, Sarospatak). The Hungarian Reformed Church adopted the Heidelberg Catechism and the Second Helvetic Confession as a definition of their teaching, together the Ecumenical creeds of the Christian Church: Athanasian Creed, Nicene Creed, Chalcedon, and the common creed ("Apostles' Creed"). The Hungarians organised the Calvinist church in 1557 in the Synod of Csenger and adopted the Second Helvetic Confession in 1567 in Debrecen.

The Hungarian Reformed Church maintains educational institutions, almost 80 primary schools, 28 high schools, 47 nurseries and several vocational schools and the Bethesda Hospital. There are diaconal institutions and conference centres.

In 2001, more than 1.6 million people in Hungary identified as members of the Hungarian Reformed Church. Of that number, about 600,000 are considered active members, in 1,249 congregations. The HRC has 27 presbyteries, four districts and a General Synod. In Romania, 700,000 people identified as Calvinist in 800 congregations, nearly all of them ethnic Hungarians living in Transylvania.

There is the more theologically conservative Reformed Presbyterian Church of Central and Eastern Europe, which has approximately 25 congregations in Hungary, Slovakia, Romania and Ukraine. Like the mainline Hungarian Reformed church, from which it split in 1997, the church adheres to the Second Helvetic Confession and the Heidelberg Catechism, but it has also adopted the Westminster Confession, and Shorter and Larger Catechisms.

The Reformed Presbyterian Church of Central and Eastern Europe maintains the Károlyi Gáspár Institute of Theology and Missions, located in Miskolc, Hungary.

There is a mission church of the Communion of Reformed Evangelical Churches in Diósd, near Budapest.

=== Italy ===
- The Waldensian Evangelical Church

This is an Italian historical Protestant denomination. After the Protestant Reformation, the small church absorbed Calvinist theology, under the influence of Guillaume Farel, and became the Italian branch of the European Calvinist churches.

In 1975, the Waldensian Church (around 45,000 members, plus some 15,000 affiliates in Argentina and Uruguay) joined forces with the Italian Methodist Church (5,000) to form the Union of Methodist and Waldensian Churches. It is member of both the World Alliance of Reformed Churches and the World Methodist Council, due to its nature of a united church.

- The Evangelical Reformed Baptist Churches in Italy

This is a Reformed Baptist denomination. As a member of the World Reformed Fellowship, this network of churches recovers the Calvinist tradition of Pietro Martire Vermigli and Girolamo Zanchi.

- The Presbyterian Church in Italy

This is a mission of the Presbyterian Church of Brazil in Italy.

- Presbyterian and Reformed Church in Italy

=== Latvia ===
- Reformed Church in Latvia

=== Liechtenstein ===
- Evangelical Church in Liechtenstein

=== Lithuania ===
- Lithuanian Evangelical Reformed Church

=== Luxemburg ===
- Protestant Church of Luxembourg
- Protestant Reformed Church of Luxembourg

=== Macedonia ===
- Union of Evangelical Congregational Churches in Macedonia

=== Netherlands ===
The Dutch Calvinist churches have suffered numerous splits, and there have been some subsequent partial re-unions. Currently there are at least nine existing denominations, including (between brackets the Dutch abbreviation):

- Protestant Church in the Netherlands (PKN) formed in 2004 from the union of
  - the Dutch Reformed Church (NHK),
  - the Reformed Churches in the Netherlands (GKN),
  - and the Evangelical Lutheran Church in the Kingdom of the Netherlands (ELK);
  - a notable Calvinist group within the PKN is the Reformed Association
- Christian Reformed Churches (CGK)
- Dutch Reformed Churches (NGK) formed in 2023 from the union of
  - Reformed Churches in the Netherlands (Liberated) (GKV)
  - Netherlands Reformed Churches (NGK)
- Reformed Congregations (GG)
- Old-Reformed Congregations in the Netherlands (OGGiN)
  - Old-Reformed Congregations (unconnected)
- Reformed Congregations in the Netherlands (GGiN)
  - Reformed Congregations in the Netherlands (unconnected)
- Restored Reformed Church (HHK)
- Continued Reformed Churches in the Netherlands (VGKN)
- Reformed Churches (GK) formed in 2024 from the union of
  - Reformed Churches in the Netherlands (Restored)
  - Reformed Churches the Netherlands
- Korean Reformed Church in the Netherlands
- Covenant of Free Evangelical Congregations in the Netherlands - member of the World Communion of Reformed Churches
- Moluccan Evangelical Church (GIM)
- Indonesian Christian Church in the Netherlands (GKIN)

Since the Reformation, the Netherlands, as one of the few countries in the world, could be characterised as a mainly Calvinist state. Until the first half of the 20th century, a majority of the Dutch (about 55%) were Calvinist and a large minority (35-40%) were Catholic. Because of large-scale secularisation during the 20th century, these percentages dropped dramatically. Today only 15-20% of the Dutch (about 2.5 million people) is Calvinist, while 25-30% is Catholic. About 45% is non-religious. Today many orthodox Calvinist Christians in the Netherlands cooperate with Evangelicals in organizations such as the 'Evangelische Omroep' (Evangelical Broadcasting Company), the 'Evangelische Hogeschool' (Evangelical College), and the political party 'ChristenUnie' (ChristianUnion)

Dutch emigrants and missionaries brought Calvinist churches to many other countries outside Europe, including Canada, United States, South Africa, Indonesia, Australia and New Zealand.

=== Norway ===
- First Presbyterian Church of Norway

=== Poland ===
- Polish Reformed Church
- Confederation of Reformed Evangelical Churches in Poland

=== Portugal ===
- Evangelical Reformed Church in Portugal
- Evangelical Presbyterian Church in Portugal
- Christian Presbyterian Church in Portugal
- Union of Evangelical Congregational Churches in Portugal
- Renewed Presbyterian Church in Portugal - mission of the Renewed Presbyterian Church in Brazil
- St. Andrews Church, Church of Scotland in Lisbon

=== Romania ===
The Reformed Church in Romania consist of two dioceses. These are:

- Reformed Diocese of Királyhágómellék
- Reformed Diocese of Transylvania

In Transylvania, the Calvinist faith took root in the 16th century. In 1564, a Synod was held in Nagyenyed (today Aiud) when the Calvinist and Lutheran churches separated. This date is the founding date of the Reformed Diocese of Transylvania. Partium (today partially Crișana) used to be a separated geographical area from Transylvania, also ruled by Hungarian/Transylvanian princes. In this region was founded the Királyhágómellék Reformed District. Transylvania was part of Hungary until 1920. The Confessions of these churches are the Apostles Creed, the Heidelberg Catechism. In the church buildings, especially in smaller villages, the men and women sitting separated and the children and those who were not yet married were sitting in the church choir or gallery. The believers are predominantly (95%) Hungarian, so the worship language is also Hungarian. It has 800 congregations and 700,000 members.

- Evangelical Reformed Church of Romania

A Romanian mission of the United Reformed Churches in North America was founded in Bucharest in 2016.

=== Russia ===
- Communion of Reformed Evangelical Churches in Eurasia
- Molokans
- Reformed Fundamental Church in Russia
- Union of Evangelical Reformed Churches in Russia
- Hundreds of Presbyterian Congregations are existing in Russia, which are the fruit of the Korean Presbyterian denominations from South Korea.

=== Serbia ===
- Reformed Christian Church in Serbia was also part of The Reformed Church in Hungary till 1920
- Protestant Reformed Christian Church in Serbia

=== Slovakia ===
Reformed Christian Church in Slovakia was part of the Reformed Church in Hungary until the end of World War I. In 1993, a theological seminary was opened in Komárno. Cathechial schools are in Kosice and Komarno. In Slovakia, 110,000 Calvinists were recorded.

=== Slovenia ===
- Reformed Church in Slovenia

=== Spain ===
- Spanish Evangelical Church
- Reformed Churches in Spain
- Evangelical Presbyterian Church in Spain

=== Sweden ===
- Mission Covenant Church of Sweden
- Evangelical Reformed Church in Sweden

=== Switzerland ===
The Swiss Reformed Churches were started in Zurich by Huldrych Zwingli and spread within a few years to Basle (Johannes Oecolampadius), Berne (Berchtold Haller and Niklaus Manuel), St. Gall (Joachim Vadian), to cities in Southern Germany, and via Alsace (Martin Bucer) to France. After Zwingli's early death in 1531, his work was continued by Heinrich Bullinger, the author of the Second Helvetic Confession. The French-speaking cities Neuchatel, Geneva and Lausanne changed to the Reformation ten years later under William Farel and John Calvin coming from France. The Zwingli and Calvin branches each had their theological distinctions, but in 1549, under the lead of Bullinger and Calvin, they came to a common agreement in the Consensus Tigurinus (Zurich Consent), and 1566 in the Second Helvetic Confession. Organizationally, the Reformed Churches in Switzerland remained separate units until today (the Reformed Church of the Canton Zurich, the Reformed Church of the Canton Berne, etc.), the German part more in the Zwingli tradition, in the French part more in the Calvin tradition. Today they are members of the Federation of Swiss Protestant Churches. They are governed synodically and their relation to the respective canton (in Switzerland, there are no church-state regulations at country level) ranges from independent to close collaboration, depending on historical developments. A distinctive of the Swiss Reformed churches in Zwingli tradition is their historically almost symbiotic link to the state (cantons) which is only loosening gradually in the present.

There are a small number of conservative churches like the Evangelical Reformed Church (Westminster Confession) and the Lausanne Free Church.

A total of 2.4 million Swiss are members of Calvinist churches, according to the 2000 census, which corresponds to 33% of the population. The past decades show a rapid decline in this proportion, coming from 46% in 1970.

=== Ukraine ===
- Reformed Church in Transcarpathia

It is the oldest Protestant community in Ukraine, established during the 16th century. 70-75% of Transcarpathian Hungarians are followers of the Calvinist faith. The church currently has three dioceses with about 120,000 - 140,000 members and is itself a member of the World Communion of Reformed Churches.

- Evangelical Reformed Church in Transcarpathia
- Union of Evangelical Reformed Churches of Ukraine
  - Ukrainian Evangelical Reformed Church
  - Evangelical Presbyterian Church of Ukraine

This church was started by missionaries of the Presbyterian Church in America and has 12 congregations and missions with 11 ordained national pastors; it maintains a Calvinist seminary in Kyiv.

== Oceania ==
=== American Samoa ===
- Congregational Christian Church in American Samoa

=== Australia ===
- Australian Free Church
- Christian Reformed Churches of Australia
- Evangelical Presbyterian Church
- EV Church
- Free Presbyterian Church (Australia)
- Free Reformed Churches of Australia
- Hungarian Reformed Church in Australia
- Presbyterian Church of Australia (Presbyterian)
- Presbyterian Church of Eastern Australia (Presbyterian - Free)
- Presbyterian Reformed Church (Australia) (Presbyterian Reformed)
- Reformation Presbyterian Church, Australian Presbytery
- Reformed Presbyterian Church of Australia (part of the Reformed Presbyterian Church (denominational group))
- Southern Presbyterian Church
- Uniting Church in Australia (Presbyterian, Methodist and Congregationalist)
- Westminster Presbyterian Church of Australia

==== Congregational churches ====
- Congregational Federation of Australia
- Uniting Church in Australia
- Fellowship of Congregational Churches

=== Cook Islands ===
- Cook Islands Christian Church

=== Fiji ===
- St. Andrews Presbyterian Church in Fiji

=== French Polynesia ===
- Maóhi Protestant Church
- New Evangelical Reformed Church
- Independent Church of French Polynesia
- Christian Church in French Polynesia

=== Marshall Islands ===
- United Church of Christ-Congregational in the Marshall Islands
- Reformed Congregational Churches (Marshall Islands)

=== Micronesia ===
- Namoneas Congregational Church in Chuuk
- United Church of Christ in Kosrae
- United Church of Christ in Pohnpei

=== New Caledonia ===
- Evangelical Church in New Caledonia and the Loyalty Islands
- Free Evangelical Church

=== New Zealand ===
- Reformed Churches of New Zealand
- Presbyterian Church of Aotearoa New Zealand (Presbyterian)
- Grace Presbyterian Church of New Zealand (Presbyterian)
- Fellowship of Reformed Baptist Churches in New Zealand
- Free Presbyterian Church of Scotland - Australia and New Zealand Presbytery
- Congregational Union of New Zealand

=== Kiribati ===
- Kiribati Protestant Church

=== Nauru ===
- Nauru Congregational Church

=== Niue ===
- Church of Niue

=== Solomon Islands ===
- United Church in the Solomon Islands

=== Tuvalu ===
- Church of Tuvalu

=== Vanuatu ===
- Presbyterian Church in Vanuatu
- Presbyterian Reformed Church in Vanuatu

=== Western Samoa ===
- Congregational Christian Church in Samoa

== North America ==
=== Presbyterians ===
- American Presbyterian Church (1979 from the BPC)
- Associate Reformed Presbyterian Church (Scots-Irish Presbyterians)
- Bible Presbyterian Church (1937 from the OPC)
- Covenant Presbyterian Church
- Covenant Reformed Presbyterian Church
- Cumberland Presbyterian Church
- Cumberland Presbyterian Church in America
- ECO: A Covenant Order of Evangelical Presbyterians
- Evangel Presbytery
- Evangelical Assembly of Presbyterian Churches in America
- Evangelical Presbyterian Church
- Faith Presbytery, Bible Presbyterian Church
- Free Church of Scotland - has about 9 congregations in North America
- Free Church of Scotland (Continuing) - has 7 congregations in North America
- Free Presbyterian Church of North America
- Korean-American Presbyterian Church
- Korean Evangelical Presbyterian Church in America
- Korean Presbyterian Church Abroad
- Korean Presbyterian Church in America (Kosin)
- Orthodox Presbyterian Church
- Presbyterian Church in America

The PCA is the second largest Presbyterian denomination in the United States, after the PC(USA). Its motto is: "Faithful to the Scriptures, True to the Reformed Faith and Obedient to the Great Commission of Jesus Christ."

- Presbyterian Church in Canada

The Presbyterian Church in Canada, formed in June 1875, as a union of 4 Presbyterian groups in the Dominion of Canada (created in 1867); These "Continuing Presbyterians", did not join the United Church of Canada in 1925, of Presbyterians, along with Methodists, Congregationalists, and Union Churches.

- Presbyterian Church (U.S.A.)

Most Presbyterian churches adhere to the Westminster Confession of Faith, but the Presbyterian Church (U.S.A.), in order to embrace the historical expressions of the whole Reformed tradition as found in the United States, has adopted a Book of Confessions which includes the Westminster Confession of Faith.

- Reformed Presbyterian Church General Assembly (1990 from the RPCUS)
- Reformed Presbyterian Church - Hanover Presbytery
- Reformed Presbyterian Church of North America (RPCNA, Scottish Covenanters)
- Upper Cumberland Presbyterian Church separated from the Cumberland Presbyterian Church

=== Continental Reformeds ===
- Alliance of Reformed Churches(founded 2021 out of the RCA)
- Calvin Synod (United Church of Christ)
- Canadian and American Reformed Churches (Dutch Reformed - Liberated)
- Christian Reformed Church in North America (Dutch Reformed - GKN)
- Free Reformed Churches in North America - (Dutch Reformed - CGKN)
- French Protestant (Huguenot) Church, Charleston, SC——The only French Calvinist or Huguenot congregation still existing in the United States.
- Heritage Netherlands Reformed Congregations
- Hungarian Reformed Church in America
- Kingdom Network (inaugurating September 9, 2021 out of the RCA)
- Lithuanian Evangelical Reformed Church in America
- Netherlands Reformed Congregations

Associated with the Dutch Reformed (Gereformeerde Gemeenten (Dutch)) churches in the Netherlands.

- Protestant Reformed Churches in America (Dutch Reformed - GKN)

One of the most conservative of all Reformed/Calvinist denominations, the PRCA separated from the Christian Reformed Church in the 1920s in a schism over the issue of common grace.

- Reformed Congregations in North America
- Reformed Church in the United States (German Reformed)

The majority of the original Reformed Church in the United States, which was founded in 1725, merged with Evangelical Synod of North America (a mix of German Reformed & Lutheran theologies) to form the Evangelical and Reformed Church in 1940 (which would merge with the Congregational Christian Churches in 1957 to form the United Church of Christ) leaving the Eureka Classis serving as a Continuing church of the Reformed Church in the United States until 1986, when it was dissolved to form the Synod of the Reformed Church in the United States

- Reformed Church in America

The Reformed Church in America (RCA) is the oldest Dutch Reformed denomination in the United States, dating back from the mid-17th century

- Reformed Church of Quebec
- United Reformed Churches in North America (Dutch Reformed - GKN)

=== Congregational ===
- Congregational Christian Churches in Canada

=== Reformed Anglicans ===
- Anglican Mission in the Americas
- Reformed Anglican Church
- Reformed Episcopal Church

=== Reformed Baptist ===
- Association of Reformed Baptist Churches of America
- Fellowship of Independent Reformed Evangelicals

=== Others ===
- Communion of Reformed Evangelical Churches
- Puritan Reformed Church
- Newfrontiers in the United States
- Sovereign Grace Churches (Credobaptist, charismatic)

== Asia ==
=== Bangladesh ===
- Bangladesh Reformed Baptist Church
- Church of Bangladesh
- Presbyterian Church of Bangladesh
- Peace Church Bangladesh
- Grace Presbyterian Church in Bangladesh
- Smyrna House of Prayer Church in Bangladesh
- Sylhet Presbyterian Synod
- Korean Presbyterian Church in Bangladesh
- Evangelical Reformed Presbyterian Church in Bangladesh
- Hill Tracts Presbyterian Kawhmi
- Bangladesh Bible Presbyterian Church
- Isa-e Church

=== Cambodia ===
- Presbyterian Church in Cambodia
- Evangelical Fellowship in Cambodia

=== China ===
- Church of Christ in China

=== East Timor ===
- Protestant Church in East Timor
- Evangelical Presbyterian Church of East Timor

=== Indonesia ===
- Indonesian Reformed Church

=== Japan ===
- Evangelical Reformed Church in Japan
- United Church of Christ in Japan
- Church of Christ in Japan
- Reformed Church in Japan
- Presbyterian Church in Japan
- Reformed Presbyterian Church in Japan
- Japan Presbytery - Cumberland Presbyterian Church
- Japan Presbytery - Reformed Presbyterian Church in North America
- Korean Christian Church in Japan
- The Biblical Church

=== Republic of South Korea ===
Most Presbyterian denominations share same name, the Presbyteian Church in Korea, tracing back their history to the United Presbyterian Assembly. There are 15 million Protestants in South Korea, about 9 millions are Presbyterians and there are more than 100 Presbyterian denominations. Before the Korean War Presbyterians were very strong in North Korea, many fled to South, and established their own Presbyterian denominations. The Presbyterian Churches are by far the largest Protestant churches with well over 20 000 congregations. For more information see Presbyterianism in South Korea.

- Presbyterian Church in Korea (Koshin) (Kosin 고신). The PCK is a Reformed denomination in Korea which accepts the Westminster standards as its confession. The church also recognizes "Three Forms of Unity", to be same as the Westminster Standards. Kosin church wants to be a biblical and confessional denomination, pure in doctrine and life. There are about 2,000 local churches, including some churches in North America and Europe.
- The Presbyterian Church in Korea (HapDong) The (Hapdong 합동) group was formed the primary body of the Presbyterian General Assembly (the Reformed Church in Korea) was established by missionaries of the Presbyterian Church (USA), and Canadian and Australian Presbyterians. For more information see Presbyterianism in Korea
- The Independent Reformed Church in Korea (IRC) was established in 1964, independently from other denominations. IRC is the first church in Korea to put "reformed" in her name. IRC confesses the Westminster Standards, Heidelberg Catechism, and Canons of Dordt together with the ecumenical creeds.
- Presbyterian Church in Korea (GaeHyuk)
- Presbyterian Church in Korea (TongHap) - it is the second largest Presbyterian church in Korea. An ecumenical church body, member of the World Council of Churches. It was founded in 1884 by missionaries from the United States and Canada.
- Orthodox Presbyterian Church of Korea-OPCK(Founder. Ha Seung-moo) is a historic Orthodox Reformed Church's doctrine and historical succession of tradition of the John Knox's <Scottish Presbyterian Church> declared the first among Presbyterian denomination in Korea. Launched in January 2012.
- Presbyterian Church in the Republic of Korea - the church was formed in 1953 and has about 350 000 members
- Presbyterian Church in Korea (HapDongChongShin)
- Presbyterian Church in Korea (ChanYang)
- Presbyterian Church in Korea (JaeGun)
- Presbyterian Church in Korea (HapDongChunTong)
- Presbyterian Church in Korea (HapDongBoSu)
- Presbyterian Church in Korea (HapDongBoSu I.)
- Presbyterian Church in Korea (BupTong)
- Presbyterian Church in Korea (JangShin)
- Presbyterian Church in Korea (Daeshin)
- Presbyterian Church in Korea (BoSuHapDong)
- Presbyterian Church in Korea (YeJangHapBo)
- Presbyterian Church in Korea (HyukShin)
- Presbyterian Church in Korea (ChanYang)
- Presbyterian Church in Korea (JapDongJungAng)
- Conservative Presbyterian Church in Korea
- Presbyterian Church in Korea (HwanWon)
- Presbyterian Church in Korea (PyungAhn)
- Presbyterian Church in Korea (SunGyo)
- Presbyterian Church in Korea (NamBuk)
- Presbyterian Church in Korea (JungAng)
- Presbyterian Church in Korea (YunShin)
- Presbyterian Church in Korea (KoRyuPa)
- Presbyterian Church in Korea (DongShin)
- Presbyterian Church in Korea (YeJong)
- Presbyterian Church in Korea (BokUm)
- Presbyterian Church in Korea (JungAng)
- Presbyterian Church in Korea (JungRip)
- Presbyterian Church in Korea (SungHapChuk)
- Presbyterian Church in Korea (JeongRip)
- Presbyterian Church in Korea (ChanYang)
- Presbyterian Church in Korea (DokNoHoe)
- Presbyterian Church in Korea (Logos)
- Presbyterian Church in Korea (HapDongBokUm)
- Presbyterian Church in Korea (BoSuTongHap)
- Presbyterian Church in Korea (JeongTongChongHap)
- Presbyterian Church in Korea (HapDongChungYun)
- Presbyterian Church in Korea (HanGukBoSu)
- Presbyterian Church in Korea (HapDongEunChong)
- Presbyterian Church in Korea (HapDongJinRi)
- Presbyterian Church in Korea (HapDongYunHap)
- Presbyterian Church in Korea (HapDongYeChong)
- Presbyterian Church in Korea (Ko-Ryu-Anti-Accusation)
- Presbyterian Church in Korea (ChanYang)
- Presbyterian Church in Korea (HapDongChongShin I.)
- Presbyterian Church in Korea (HapDongChinShin II.)
- Presbyterian Church in Korea (HapDongSeungHoe)
- Presbyterian Church in Korea (YeJong)
- Presbyterian Church in Korea (HapDongChongHoe)
- Presbyterian Church in Korea (JeongTongGyeSeung)
- Presbyterian Church in Korea (HapDongTongHap)
- Presbyterian Church in Korea (DongShin)
- Presbyterian Church in Korea (BoSuHapDong II.)
- Presbyterian Church in Korea (HapDongSeungHoe)
- Presbyterian Church in Korea (DaeShin II.)
- Presbyterian Church in Korea (HapDongHwanWon)
- Presbyterian Church in Korea (HapDongBoSu IV.)
- Presbyterian Church in Korea (HapDongBoSu III.)
- Presbyterian Church in Korea (HapDongBoSu II.)
- Presbyterian Church in Korea (ChongHoe II.)
- Presbyterian Church in Korea (TongHapBoSu)
- Presbyterian Church in Korea (DaeHanShinChuk)
- Presbyterian Church in Korea (HapDongYeChong I)
- Presbyterian Church in Korea (HapDongSeongHoe)
- Presbyterian Church in Korea (GaeHyukHapDong I)
- Presbyterian Church in Korea (GaeHyukHapDong II)
- Presbyterian Church in Korea (HapDongGaeHyuk)
- Presbyterian Church in Korea (HapDongJangShin)
- Presbyterian Church in Korea (HoHun III)
- Presbyterian Church in Korea (DaeShin II)
- Presbyterian Church in Korea (ChongHoe II)
- Presbyterian Church in Korea (ChongHoe I)
- Presbyterian Church in Korea (HapDongYeChong I)
- Presbyterian Church in Korea (GaeHyukHapDong III)
- Presbyterian Church in Korea (DokNoHoe II)
- Presbyterian Church in Korea (BoSuJeongTong)
- Presbyterian Church in Korea (HapDongYeSun)
- Presbyterian Church in Korea (HapShin)
- Presbyterian Church in Korea (HapDongJeongShin)
- Independent Reformed Presbyterian Church in Korea
- Korea Presbyterian Church
- Union Presbyterian Church in Korea
- United Presbyterian Church in Korea
- Conservative Reformed Presbyterian Church in Korea
- Women Pastors Presbyterian Church in Korea
- Korea Jesus Presbyterian Church
- Fundamentalist Presbyterian General Assembly in Korea
- Korean Christian Fundamentalist Assembly
- Korean Presbyterian Church (GaeHyuk I.)
- Korean Presbyterian Church (HoHun)
- Pure Presbyterian Church in Korea
- Onnuri Community Church
- SaRang Community Church

=== Hong Kong ===
- The Hong Kong Council of the Church of Christ in China

=== India ===
- Reformed Baptist Church, Vinukonda, Guntur Dt., Andhra Pradesh
- Reformed Baptist Fellowship in India
- The Malankara Mar Thoma Syrian Church of Malabar
- St. Thomas Evangelical Church of India
- Bible Presbyterian Church in India
- Presbyterian Church of India
- Presbyterian Church in India (Reformed)
- Presbyterian Reformed Church in India
- United Basel Mission Church
- Reformed Presbyterian Church of India
- Presbyterian Church in South India
- Reformed Presbyterian Church North East India
- Church of South India
- Church of North India
- Presbyterian Free Church of Central India
- Evangelical Church of Maraland
- Congregational Church in India
- United Church of Northern India - Presbyterian Synod
- South India Reformed Churches
- Free Presbyterian Church, Kalimpong
- Evangelical Presbyterian Church of Sikkim
- Covenant Reformed Assemblies

=== Indonesia ===
- Gereja Masehi Injili Halmahera (The Christian Evangelical Church in Halmahera)
- Gereja Batak Karo Protestan ( Karo Batak Protestant Church)
- Gereja Injili Indonesia (Indonesian Evangelical Church)
- Gereja Jemaat Protestan di Indonesia (Protestant Congregations Church in Indonesia)
- Gereja Kalimantan Evangelis (Evangelical Church in Kalimantan)
- Gereja Kemah Injil Indonesia (Indonesian Gospel Tabernacle Church)
- Gereja Kristen di Luwuk Banggai (Christian Church in Luwuk Banggai)
- Gereja Kristen di Sulawesi Selatan (Christian Church in South Sulawesi)
- Gereja Kristen Indonesia (Indonesian Christian Church)
- Gereja Kristen Indonesia Sulawesi Selatan (Indonesian Christian Church of Sulawesi)
- Gereja Kristen Injili Di Tanah Papua (Evangelical Christian Church of the Land of Papua)
- Gereja Kristen Jawa (Javanese Christian Church)
- Gereja Kristen Jawa Tengah Utara (Javanese Christian Church of Northern Central Java)
- Gereja Kristen Jawi Wetan (The East Java Christian Church)
- Gereja Kristen Kalam Kudus (Holy Word Christian Church)
- Gereja Kristen Kalimantan Barat (West Kalimantan Christian Church)
- Gereja Kristen Pasundan (Pasundan Christian Church)
- Gereja Kristen Pemancar Injil (Gospel Propagating Christian Church)
- Gereja Kristen Protestan di Bali (Protestant Christian Church in Bali)
- Gereja Kristen Sulawesi Tengah (Christian Church in Central Sulawesi)
- Gereja Kristen Sumatera Bagian Selatan (Christian Church of Southern Sumatra)
- Gereja Kristen Sumba (Christian Church of Sumba)
- Gereja Kristus (Church of Christ in Indonesia)
- Gereja Kristus Tuhan (The Church of Christ the Lord)
- Gereja Masehi Injili di Bolaang Mongondow (Christian Evangelical Church in Bolaang Mongondow)
- GMIH (Evangelical Christian Church in Halmahera)
- Gereja Masehi Injili di Minahasa (Christian Evangelical Church in Minahasa)
- Gereja Masehi Injili di Timor (Christian Evangelical Church in Timor)
- Gereja Masehi Injili Sangihe-Talaud (Christian Evangelical Church in Sangihe-Talaud)
- Gereja Protestan di Indonesia Bagian Barat (Protestant Church in West Indonesia)
- Gereja Protestan di Indonesia (Protestant Church in Indonesia)
- Gereja Protestan di Sulawesi Tenggara (Protestant Church in Southeast Sulawesi)
- Gereja Protestan Indonesia di Buol Toli-Toli (Indonesian Protestant Church in Buol Toli-Toli)
- Gereja Protestan Indonesia di Gorontalo (Indonesian Protestant Church in Gorontalo)
- Gereja Protestan Indonesia di Irjan Jaya (Indonesian Protestant Church in Irian Jaya)
- Gereja Protestan Indonesia Donggala (Indonesian Protestant Church in Donggala)
- Gereja Protestan Indonesia Luwu (Luwu Indonesian Protestant Church)
- Gereja Protestan Kalimantan Barat (Protestant Church of West Kalimantan)
- Gereja Protestan Maluku (Protestant Church in the Moluccas)
- Gereja Reformed Injili Indonesia (Indonesian Reformed Evangelical Church)
- Gereja Toraja (Toraja Church)
- Gereja Toraja Mamasa (Toraja Mamasa Church)
- Gereja-Gereja Kristen Indonesia Sumatera Utara (Indonesian Christian Church of North Sumatera)
- Gereja-Gereja Masehi Musyafir (The Pilgrim's Churches)
- Gereja-Gereja Reformasi Calvinis
- Gereja-Gereja Reformasi di Indonesia (Reformed Churches in Indonesia - Irian Jaya)
- Gereja-Gereja Reformasi di Indonesia (Reformed Churches in Indonesia - Nusa Tenggara Timur)
- Gereja-Gereja Reformasi di Indonesia Kalimantan Barat (Reformed Churches in Indonesia - Kalimantan Barat)
- Kerapatan Gereja Protestan Minahasa (Minahasa Protestant Church Assemblies)

(source: reformiert-online)

=== Kazakhstan ===
- Evangelical Reformed Church in Kazakhstan

=== Laos ===
- Lao Evangelical Church
- Lao Presbyterian Church

=== Lebanon ===
- National Evangelical Synod of Syria and Lebanon
- National Evangelical Union of Lebanon
- Union of the Armenian Evangelical Churches in the Near East

=== Malaysia ===
- Presbyterian Church in Malaysia
- Christ Evangelical Reformed Church
- Reformed Baptist Churches Malaysia

=== Mongolia ===
- Presbyterian Church in Mongolia fruit of various Korean Presbyterian denominations

=== Myanmar ===
- Reformed Presbyterian Church in Myanmar
- Presbyterian Church in Myanmar
- United Reformed Church in Myanmar
- Reformed Evangelical Church in Myanmar
- Biblical Reformed Church in Myanmar
- Evangelical Presbyterian Church of Myanmar
- Christian Reformed Church in Myanmar
- Independent Presbyterian Church in Myanmar
- Mara Evangelical Church
- Reformed Churches of Myanmar
- Protestant Reformed Church in Myanmar
- Free Reformed Church in Myanmar
- Congregational Federation of Myanmar

=== Nepal ===
- Presbyterian Church in Nepal
- Nepali Reformed Churches
- Evangelical Presbyterian Church of Nepal
- Free Presbyterian Church of Nepal
- Aashish Presbyterian Free Church in Nepal

=== Pakistan ===
- Presbyterian Church of Pakistan
- United Presbyterian Church of Pakistan
- Associate Reformed Presbyterian Church in Pakistan
- Church of Pakistan - Sialkot Diocese
- Reformed Church of Pakistan

=== Philippines ===
- Bastion of Truth Reformed Churches in the Philippines
- Berean Protestant Reformed Church Philippines
- Christian Reformed Church in the Philippines (Bread from Heaven Assemblies)
- Protestant Reformed Church in Bulacan
- United Covenant Reformed Church in the Philippines
- Presbyterian Church of the Philippines
- Reformed Churches in the Philippines (Dorthian Federation)
- United Church of Christ in the Philippines
- Cubao Reformed Baptist Church, Quezon City, Philippines
- Iglesia Evangelica Unida de Cristo in the Philippines
- Federation of Protestant Reformed Churches in the Philippines

=== Sri Lanka ===
- Christian Reformed Church in Sri Lanka
- Lanka Reformed Church
- Presbytery of Lanka
- St. Andrew's Scots Church in Colombo, Sri Lanka
- United Church Nuwara Eliya

=== Singapore ===
- First Evangelical Reformed Church
- Covenant Evangelical Reformed Church
- Pilgrim Covenant Church
- Life Bible Presbyterian Church
- Bethany Independent-Presbyterian Church Singapore
- Presbyterian Church in Singapore
- Shalom Church (Reformed Baptist) Singapore
- Bible Presbyterian Church in Singapore

=== Thailand ===
- Church of Christ in Thailand
- Presbyterian Church of Thailand

=== Taiwan ===
- Presbyterian Church in Taiwan
- Reformed Presbyterian Church in Taiwan
- China Presbyterian Church
- Taiwan Toa-Seng Presbyterian Church
- The General Assembly of the Evangelical Presbyterian Church
- Christian Reformed Church in Taiwan
- Friendship Presbyterian Church in Taiwan

=== Turkey ===
- Türkiye Protestan Reform Kiliseleri (Protestant Reformed Churches of Turkey) subscribes to Westminster Standards and the Three Forms of Unity
- Antalya Protestant Church - subscribes the Westminster Standards -not a denomination

=== Vietnam ===
- Presbyterian Church of Vietnam
- United Presbyterian Church of Vietnam
- God's Sovereignty in Vietnam. GSiV is not a denomination but a contact point for reformed work in Vietnam

== Africa ==
=== Algeria ===
- Protestant Church of Algeria

=== Angola ===
- Presbyterian Church of Angola
- Evangelical Reformed Church in Angola
- Evangelical Congregational Church in Angola
- United Evangelical Church in Angola
- Independent Presbyterian Church in Angola
- Renewed Presbyterian Church in Angola

=== Benin ===
- Confessional Reformed Church of Benin

=== Botswana ===
- Dutch Reformed Church in Botswana
- United Congregational Church of Southern Africa

=== Burundi ===
- Egliese Protestante Reformee du Burundi

=== Burkina Faso ===
- Reformed Evangelical Church of Burkina Faso
- Association of Evangelical Churches in Burkina Faso
- Church of the Christian Alliance

=== Cameroon ===
- Presbyterian Church in Cameroon
- Orthodox Presbyterian Church in Cameroon
- Evangelical Church of Cameroon
- Presbyterian Church of Cameroon
- African Protestant Church

=== Central African Republic ===
- Protestant Church of Christ the King
- Evangelical Church of Central Africa

=== Chad ===
- Evangelical Church of Chad

=== Democratic Republic of Congo ===
- Presbyterian Community in Congo
- United Reformed Church in Congo
- Church of Christ in Congo
- Presbyterian Community in Kinshasa
- Reformed Community of Presbyterians
- Presbyterian Community in Eastern Kasai
- Presbyterian Community in Western Kasai
- Reformed Presbyterian Community in Africa
- Evangelical Community of Kwango
- Evangelical Community in Congo
- Protestant Community of Shaba
- Christian Reformed Church in Congo Eastern Africa
- Community of Disciples of Christ
- Reformed Church of the Faith in Congo

=== Republic of Congo ===
- Evangelical Church of Congo

=== Djibouti ===
- Protestant Church of Djibouti

=== Egypt ===
- Evangelical Church of Egypt (Synod of the Nile)
- Armenian Evangelical Church

=== Equatorial Guinea ===
- Reformed Presbyterian Church of Equatorial Guinea

=== Eritrea ===
- Mehrete Yesus Evangelical Presbyterian Church in Asmara

=== Ethiopia ===
- Ethiopian Evangelical Church Mekane Yesus
- Presbyterian Church of Ethiopia
- Reformed Presbyterian Church in Ethiopia
- Ethiopian Grace Reformed Church
- The Ethiopian evangelical church Bethel

=== Gabon ===
- Evangelical Church of Gabon
- Presbyterian Church of Gabon

=== Gambia ===
- Canaan Christian Community Church in Gambia - Presbyterian Church in Korea (HapDong) - mission
- Presbyterian Church in the Gambia

=== Ghana ===
- Presbyterian Church of Ghana
- Evangelical Presbyterian Church, Ghana
- Global Evangelical Church
- Grace Reformed Baptist Church, Haatso Ecomog, Accra

=== Guinea-Bissau ===
- Presbyterian Church in Guinea-Bissau - Brazilian mission

=== Ivory Coast ===
- Evangelical Presbyterian Church of Ivory Coast

=== Lesotho ===
- Lesotho Evangelical Church

=== Liberia ===
- Presbyterian Church in Liberia
- Free Presbyterian Church in Liberia

=== Kenya ===
- Presbyterian Church of East Africa
- Africa Evangelical Presbyterian Church
- Reformed Church of East Africa
- Africa Gospel Unity Church
- Independent Presbyterian Church in Kenya
- Bible Presbyterian Church in Kenya
- Bible Christian Faith Church
- Anglican Church of Kenya

=== Malawi ===
- Church of Central Africa Presbyterian - General Synod
- Church of Central Africa Presbyterian - Livingstonia Synod (covers all of northern Malawi)
- Church of Central Africa Presbyterian - Nkhoma Synod (Central Malawi)
- Church of Central Africa Presbyterian - Blantyre Synod (southern Malawi)
- Blackman's Church of Africa Presbyterian
- Reformed Presbyterian Church of Malawi
- Evangelical Presbyterian Church of Malawi
- Renewed Presbyterian Church in Malawi

=== Madagascar ===
- Church of Jesus Christ in Madagascar
- Protestant Church of Ambohimazala-Firaisiana
- Evangelical Indigenous Mission in Madagascar

=== Mauritius ===
- Presbyterian Church of Mauritius

=== Mozambique ===
- Presbyterian Church of Mozambique
- United Church of Christ in Mozambique
- Reformed Church in Mozambique
- Reformed Church of Mozambique (Mphatso Synod)
- Evangelical Church of Christ in Mozambique
- Evangelical Church of Good Shepherd
- Renewed Presbyterian Church in Mozambique
- Mozambique Synod of the United Congregational Church in Southern Africa

=== Morocco ===
- Evangelical Church in Morocco

=== Namibia ===
- Afrikaans Protestant Church in Namibia
- Reformed Churches in Namibia
- Dutch Reformed Church in Namibia
- Uniting Reformed Church in Southern Africa
- Reformed Baptist Churches in Namibia
- United Congregational Church of Southern Africa, Namibia Synod

=== Niger ===
- Evangelical Church of the Republic of Niger
- Union of Evangelical Protestant Churches in Niger

=== Nigeria ===
- Christian Reformed Church of Nigeria - (Dutch Reformed)
- Reformed Church of Christ in Nigeria - (Dutch Reformed)
- Presbyterian Church of Nigeria - (Scottish Presbyterian)
- Qua Iboe Church - (Northern Irish non-denominational Reformed)
- Church of Christ in the Sudan among the Tiv - (Dutch Reformed)
- Evangelical Reformed Church of Christ - (Dutch Reformed)
- Nigeria Reformed Church - (Dutch Reformed)
- Church of Christ in Nigeria
- United Church of Christ in Nigeria
- Church of Nigeria (mostly reformed)
- N.K.S.T - Universal Reformed Christian Church of Nigeria

The various Reformed churches of Nigeria formed the Reformed Ecumenical Council of Nigeria in 1991 to further cooperation.

=== South Africa ===
- Christian Reformed Church in South Africa
- Evangelical Presbyterian Church in Southern Africa
- Free Reformed Churches of South Africa
- Reformed Churches in South Africa
- Dutch Reformed Church in South Africa - NG Church
- Nederduitsch Reformed Church in Africa - NH Church
- Afrikaans Protestant Church of South Africa
- Afrikaans Reformation Church, a small church with one congregation in Pretoria
- Old Reformed Church
- Uniting Presbyterian Church in Southern Africa
- Church of England in South Africa (Reformed Anglican)
- United Congregational Church in Southern Africa
- Uniting Reformed Church in Southern Africa
- Reformed Church in Africa, South Africa
- Presbyterian Church of Africa
- Free Church in Southern Africa
- Volkskerk van Afrika
- Sola 5 - formerly the Association of Reformed Baptist Churches

According to the census of 2001, more than 3.2 million people recorded themselves as Reformed. This however is fast decline compared to the 1996 census, when still 3.9 million people were Reformed. Particularly amongst black and coloured people the Reformed churches lost many members, while the number of Reformed whites remained status quo due to mass emigration.

=== Senegal ===
- Protestant Church in Senegal
- Presbyterian Church of Senegal

=== Sierra Leone ===
- Presbyterian Church of Sierra Leone
- Evangelical Presbyterian Church of Sierra Leone
- Mount Zion Presbyterian Church of Sierra Leone
- Christian Reformed Church in Sierra Leone

=== Swaziland ===
- Swaziland Reformed Church

=== Sudan and South Sudan ===
- Presbyterian Church in Sudan
- Sudan Evangelical Presbyterian Church
- South Sudan Evangelical Presbyterian Church
- Sudan Interior Church
- Sudanese Reformed Churches
- Sudanese Church of Christ
- Africa Inland Church Sudan

=== Tanzania ===
- Shekinah Presbyterian Church of Tanzania
- Reformed Church of Tanzania

=== Uganda ===
- Presbyterian Church in Uganda
- Reformed Presbyterian Church in Uganda
- Evangelical Presbyterian Church in Uganda
- Evangelical Free Church in Uganda
- Christian Reformed Church in Eastern Africa
- Calvary Reformed Church
- New Life Presbyterian Church
- Reformed Presbyterian Church in Africa (Uganda)
- Reformed Baptist Church in Uganda
- Anglican Church of Uganda
- Grace Fellowship Church in Uganda

=== Reunion ===
- Protestant Church of Reunion Island

=== Rwanda ===
- Presbyterian Church in Rwanda
- Reformed Presbyterian Church in Africa (Rwanda)
- Anglican Church of Rwanda
- Reformed Church of Rwanda

=== Togo ===
- Evangelical Presbyterian Church of Togo

=== Tunisie ===
- Reformed Church in Tunisie

=== Zambia ===
- Reformed Church in Zambia
- Church of Central Africa Presbyterian - Synod of Zambia
- United Church in Zambia

=== Zimbabwe ===
- Church of Central Africa Presbyterian - Harare Synod
- United Church of Christ in Zimbabwe
- Dutch Reformed Church - Synod Central Africa
- Reformed Church in Zimbabwe
- United Congregational Church of Southern Africa
- African Free Presbyterian Church of Zimbabwe
- Free Presbyterian Church of Scotland in Zimbabwe
- Presbyterian Church of Africa

== Central America and the Caribbean ==
=== Bahamas ===
- St. Andrews Presbyterian Kirk in Nassau

=== Bermuda ===
- Christ Church in Warwick
- St. Andrew's Presbyterian Church in Bermuda

=== Belize ===
- Presbyterian Church of Belize

=== Costa Rica ===
- Christian Reformed Church in Costa Rica
- Korean Presbyterian Church in Costa Rica
- Presbyterian Mission of Korea
- Costa Rican Evangelical Presbyterian Church
- Iglesia Presbiteriana Reformada de Costa Rica

=== Cuba ===
- Reformed Presbyterian Church in Cuba
- Christian Reformed Church in Cuba
- Iglesia Episcopal Reformada de Cuba

=== El Salvador ===
- Christian Reformed Church in El Salvador
- Reformed Calvinist Church of El Salvador
- Evangelical and Reformed Church in El Salvador

=== Guatemala ===
- National Evangelical Presbyterian Church of Guatemala
- Independent Fundamental Presbyterian Church
- Bethlehem Bible Presbyterian Church
- Presbyterian Synod of Southwest Guatemala
- Reformed Church in Guatemala
- Saint John Apostle Evangelical Church in Guatemala

=== Haiti ===
- Christian Reformed Church in Haiti
- Reformed Presbyterian Church in Haiti

=== Dominican Republic ===
- Iglesia Bíblica del Señor Jesucristo
- Christian Reformed Church of the Dominican Republic
- Dominican Evangelical Church
- Reformed church of the Dominican Republic
- Grace Reformed Bible Church - Pastor Willy Bayonet.

=== Grenada ===
- Presbyterian Church in Grenada

=== Guadalupe ===
- Reformed Church in the Antilles

=== Honduras ===
- Christian Reformed Church in Honduras
- Evangelical and Reformed Church in Honduras
- Presbyterian Church in Honduras

=== Jamaica ===
- Protestant Reformed Churches of Jamaica
- United Church in Jamaica and the Cayman Islands

=== Mexico ===
- Associate Reformed Presbyterian Church of Mexico
- Christian Congregational Churches in Mexico
- Independent Presbyterian Church in Mexico
- Mexican Communion of Reformed and Presbyterian Churches
- National Conservative Presbyterian Church in Mexico
- National Presbyterian Church in Mexico
- Presbyterian Reformed Church of Mexico

=== Nicaragua ===
- Christian Reformed Church in Nicaragua

=== Panama ===
- Presbyterian Church of Panama - founded on April 4, 2012 - (mission of Presbyterian Church of Brazil)

=== Puerto Rico ===
- Christian Reformed Church in Puerto Rico
- United Evangelical Church in Puerto Rico
- Synod of Boriquen of the PC(USA)
- Orthodox Presbyterian Church

=== Trinidad and Tobago ===
- Presbyterian Church in Trinidad and Tobago
- Reformed Bible Churches in Trinidad and Tobago

== South America ==
=== Argentina ===
- Iglesia Cristiana Evangélica Reformada Húngara (Hungarian Christian Evangelical Reformed Church)
- Iglesia Evangélica Congregacional Argentina (Evangelical Congregational Church in Argentina)
- Iglesia Evangélica del Rio de la Plata Evangelical Church of the River Plate - union of Lutherans and Reformed, mostly from German ancestry. European counterpart: Protestant Church in Germany
- Iglesia Evangelica Presbiteriana Coreana (Korean Evangelical Presbyterian Church)
- Iglesia Evangelica Suiza en la Argentina (Swiss Evangelical Church)
- Iglesia Evangélica Valdense en Argentina (Evangelical Waldensian Church of Argentina)
- Iglesia Presbiteriana San Andrés (St. Andrew's Presbyterian Church (denomination)) - founded by missionaries and immigrants of the Church of Scotland, currently is a presbytery with fraternal relations with the U.S. Evangelical Presbyterian Church
- Iglesias Reformadas en la Argentina Reformed Churches in Argentina - founded by German, Dutch and Welsh reformed immigrants
- Congregational Churches in Argentina

=== Bolivia ===
- Evangelical Presbyterian Church in Bolivia - Iglesia Evangélica Presbiteriana en Bolivia (Korean Mission)
- National Reformed Presbyterian Church of Bolivia (mission of Reformed Presbyterian Church of North America)
- Iglesia Evangelica Presbiteriana en Bolivia-Cochabamba (Korean Mission)
- Bible Presbyterian church in Bolivia - Iglesia Presbiteriana Biblica (Chilean Mission)
- Iglesia Presbiteriana de Bolivia (Brazilian Mission) - Presbyterian Church in Bolivia
- Iglesia Presbiteriana en Bolivia (Bolivian initiative)
- Independent Presbyterian Church of Bolivia (Brazilian Mission) (Independent Presbyterian Church of Brazil)

=== Brazil ===
==== Reformed churches ====
- Igreja Anglicana Reformada
- Antioch Presbyterian Church
- Arab Evangelical Church of São Paulo
- Christian Reformed Church of Campo Belo/Swiss Evangelical Church of São Paulo - Igreja Evangélica Suica de Sao Paulo
- Comunhao Reformada Batista no Brasil
- Christian Reformed Church in Brazil - Hungarian
- Dutch Reformed Church in Brazil
- Reformed Churches in Brazil - Igrejas Reformadas do Brasil
- Evangelical Reformed Churches in Brazil - Igrejas Evangelicas Reformadas no Brasil

==== Presbyterian Churches ====
- Presbyterian Church of Brazil - Igreja Presbiteriana do Brasil
- Independent Presbyterian Church of Brazil - Igreja Presbiteriana Independente do Brasil
- United Presbyterian Church of Brazil - Igreja Presbiteriana Unida do Brasil
- Conservative Presbyterian Church in Brazil - Igreja Presbiteriana Conservadora do Brasil
- Renewed Presbyterian Church in Brazil - Igreja Presbiteriana Renovada do Brasil
- Fundamentalist Presbyterian Church in Brazil - Igreja Presbiteriana Fundamentalista do Brasil
- Traditional Presbyterian Church in Brazil - Igreja Presbiteriana Tradicional do Brasil
- Korean Presbyterian Church of Brazil - Igreja Presbiteriana Coreana do Brasil
- Cumberland Presbyterian Church in Bahia - Igreja Presbiteriana Cumberland da Bahia
- Christian Evangelical Presbyterian Church in Brazil - Igreja Evangélica Crista Presbiteriana
- Chinese Presbyterian Church in Brazil
- Free Presbyterian Church in Brazil
- Reformed Presbyterian Church of Brazil
- Igrja Presbiteriana Avidada

==== Congregational churches ====
- Evangelical Congregational Church in Brazil - Igrejas Evangelicas Congregacionnais do Brasil
- Christian Evangelical Church in Brazil
- Union of Evangelical Congregational Churches in Brazil - Uniao das Igrejas Evangelicas Congregaciais do Brasil
- Aliança das Igrejas Evangélicas Congregacionais Brasileiras
- Igreja Congregacional Bíblica
- Igrejas Congregacionais Conservadoras
- Igreja Kalleyana - Igreja Puritana Reformada no Brasil
- Igrejas que militam na Obra da Restauração de Tudo - OPIMOBRART

=== Chile ===
- Christian Presbyterian Church of Chile
- Evangelical Presbyterian Church in Chile
- Presbyterian Church in Chile
- Biblical Fundamentalist Presbyterian Church in Chile
- Presbyterian Church in America, Chile
- National Presbyterian Church in Chile
- Korean Presbyterian Church of Chile
- Korean United Church of Chile
- Reformed Presbyterian Church in Chile (mission of Reformed Presbyterian Church of North America)

=== Colombia ===
- Evangelical Reformed Church of Colombia
- Cumberland Presbyterian Church in Colombia
- Presbyterian Church of Colombia (Reformed Synod) - Iglesia Presbiteriana de Colombia (Sinodo Reformado)
- Presbyterian Church of Colombia (Presbyterian Synod) - Iglesia Presbiteriana de Colombia (Synodo Presbiteriano)
- United Church of Christ (Colombia)
- Reformed Church of Latin America
- Presbyterian Church of the Reformation of Colombia

=== Ecuador ===
- Iglesia Evangelica Unida del Ecuador
- Presbyterian Reformed Church of Ecuador (Iglesia Reformada Presbiteriana del Ecuador) - Mission of Presbyterian Church in America

=== French Guiana ===
- Eglise Evangelique de la Guyane francaise - French Reformed Church in French Guiana

=== Guyana ===
- Guyana Congregational Union
- Guyana Presbyterian Church - Canadian mission
- Presbyterian Church of Guyana - Scottish mission

=== Paraguay ===
- Presbyterian Church in Paraguay - Iglesia Presbiteriana en el Paraguay - Mission of the Brazilian Presbyterian Church
- Taiwanese Presbyterian Church in Asuncion - Iglesia Presbiteriana Taiwanesa en Asuncion- Taiwanese Presbyterian mission
- Korean United Church in Paraguay - Missao Coreana en el Paraguay - Korean Presbyterian missions
- Evangelical Congregational Churches in Paraguay - Iglesias Evangelicas Congregacionalistas en el Paraguay - German Reformed
- Hope Reformed Presbyterian Church
- Reformed Presbyterian Church in Paraguay - Korean mission

=== Peru ===
- Evangelical Church of Peru - Iglesia Evangelica Peruana
- Evangelical Presbyterian and Reformed Church in Peru, union of Evangelical Presbyterian Church of Peru (Scottish Free Presbyterian mission) and National Presbyterian Church of Peru (Bible Presbyterian Church mission).

=== Suriname ===
- Hervormde Kerk van Suriname - Dutch Reformed Church of Suriname

=== Uruguay ===
- Presbyterian Church of Uruguay (mission of Presbyterian Church of Brazil)
- Iglesia Evangelica Reformada Uruguayo-Hungara
- Iglesia Evangelica Valdense de Rio de la Plata

=== Venezuela ===
- Iglesia Presbiteriana de Venezuela - Presbyterian Church of Venezuela
- Reformed Church in Venezuela
- Presbyterian Church El Redentor

== Middle East ==
=== Israel ===
- St Andrews Scots Memorial Church
- Baraka Bible Presbyterian Church
- Nes Amin Christian Settlement

=== Syria ===
- Armenian Evangelical Church

=== Lebanon ===
- Union of the Armenian Evangelical Churches in the Near East
- National Evangelical Church Union of Lebanon
- National Evangelical Synod of Syria and Lebanon

=== Iran ===
- Synod of the Evangelical Church of Iran
- Evangelical Presbyterian Church of Iran

=== Iraq ===
- Evangelical Church in Iraq

== See also ==
- List of Christian denominations § Reformed
- Presbyterianism
- List of Reformed Baptist Churches

Individual church congregations

- List of Congregational churches
- List of Presbyterian churches

International organizations

- International Conference of Reformed Churches
- Reformed Ecumenical Council
- World Alliance of Reformed Churches
- World Reformed Fellowship
- World Communion of Reformed Churches
