= National Reformed Presbyterian Church of Bolivia =

- Classification: Protestant
- Orientation: Reformed
- Theology: Calvinist
- Governance: Presbyterian
- Region: Bolivia
- Origin: 2006
- Branched from: Reformed Presbyterian Church of North America
- Members: 200 (2018)
- Official website: iprbolivia.org

The National Reformed Presbyterian Church of Bolivia also called from Reformed Presbyterian Church of Bolivia (in Spanish Iglesia Presbiteriana Reformada Nacional de Bolivia or IPRNB) is a reformed denomination in Bolivia, founded in 2006, by pastors Miguel Condoretti and Christian Villa. The denomination spread throughout the country, with churches in La Paz and El Alto. On April 23, 2022, its Presbytery was formally organized, with the help of the Reformed Presbyterian Church of North America.

== History ==
Presbyterianism arrived in Bolivia in 1987, when missionaries from the Presbyterian Church in Korea (TongHap) founded the Evangelical Presbyterian Church in Bolivia. Later, missionaries from the Presbyterian Church of Brazil started the Presbyterian Church in Bolivia in 1988.

In 2006, Pastors Miguel Condoretti and Cristian Vila founded the Reformed National Presbyterian Church of Bolivia (IPRNB). From converting people and planting churches, the denomination spread throughout the country. Churches were founded in La Paz and El Alto.

In 2018, the denomination contacted the Reformed Presbyterian Church of North America, which provided assistance to the denomination in preparing workers and recommendations on church organization.

On April 23, 2022, its Presbytery was formally organized and Rev. Cristian Vila was elected moderator of the denomination.

== Doctrine ==
The IEPB adopts the Westminster Confession of Faith, the Westminster Larger Catechism and the Westminster Shorter Catechism. The denomination differs from other Presbyterian denominations in the country in that it opposes women's ordination, practices exclusive psalmody, and Sunday keeping.
