= Evangelical Reformed Churches in Brazil =

The Evangelical Reformed Churches in Brazil (in Portuguese the Igrejas Evangélicas Reformadas no Brasil) is a Reformed church denomination in the country of Brazil, a member of the World Communion of Reformed Churches.

== Origin ==
In 1911 the first Dutch immigrants came to Brazil. Under the leadership of Leendert Verschor and Jacob C Voorsluys, a church was established in Paraná in Carambei. Later additional churches were established in Castrolanda and Arapoti. Some years later, after contact was established with the Christian Reformed Church, Reformed Churches in the Netherlands (Liberated), the Presbyterian Church of Brazil and the Buenos Aires Presbytery of the Reformed Churches in Argentina, together they decided to organize the Evangelical Reformed Church in Brazil in September 14, 1933.

On February 18, 1962 they decided to separate from the Buenos Aires Presbytery of the Reformed Church in Argentina. The church has 10 congregations and 3,000 members, it adheres to the Apostles Creed, Nicene Creed, Athanasian Creed, Heidelberg Catechism and the Belgic Confession.
