= Evangelical Presbyterian Church of East Timor =

The Evangelical Presbyterian Church of East Timor (Igreja Evangelica Presbyteriana iha Timor Leste in Tetun) is a Reformed Presbyterian denomination in East Timor with 14 churches and three chapels. It has 3,500 members, six full-time pastors, three part- time pastors, and six evangelists. The church is supported by the Presbyterian Church of Australia and a sister church relationship was formed between them. It held the foundational Synod in 2011. Contacts with the Christian Presbyterian Church in Portugal were also established and a mission trip was made to East Timor in August 2012.

== History ==
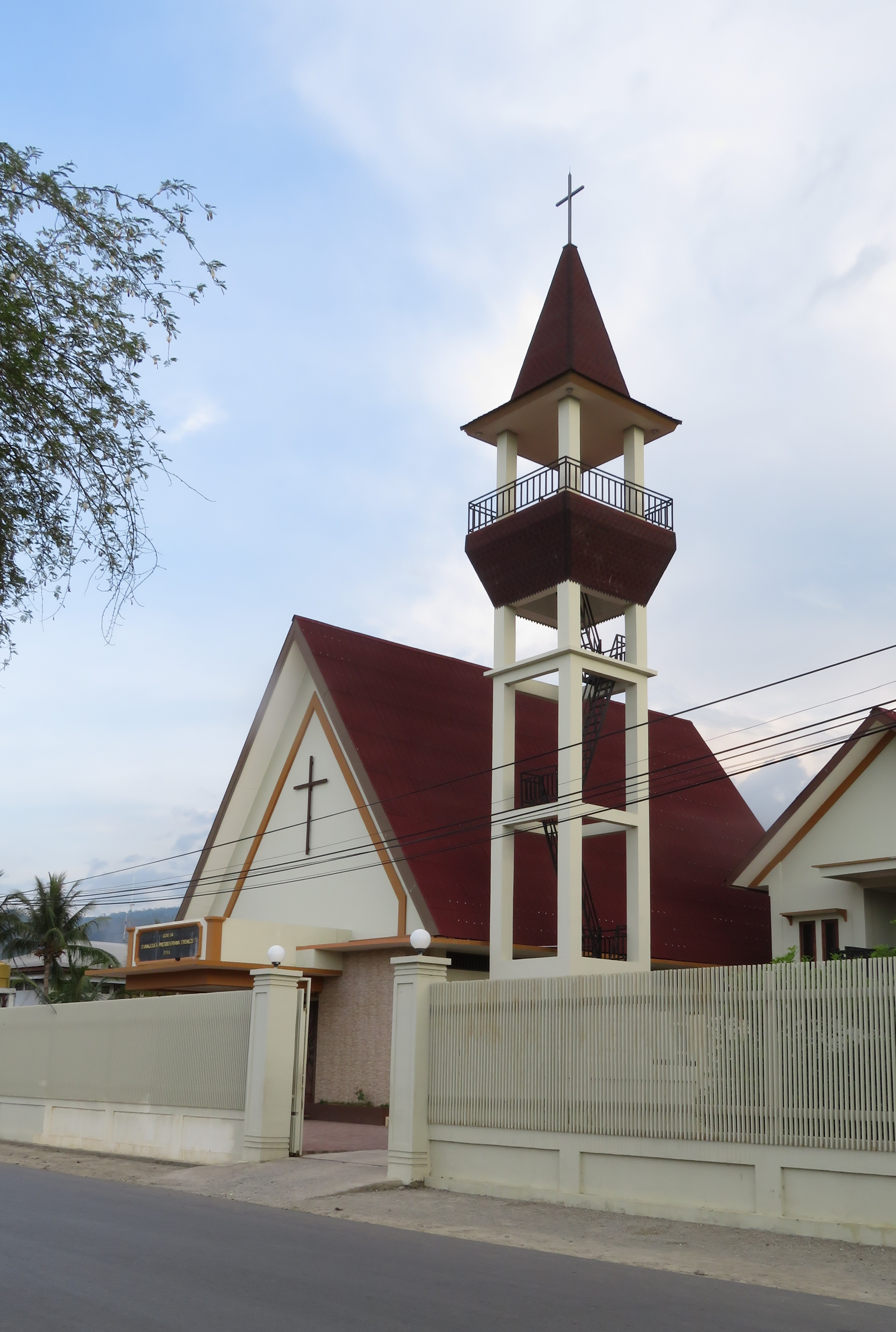
Evangelical Presbyterian Church (Igreja Ebenezer), district of Caicolí, Díli

The church was founded in the 1960s and grew rapidly. Indonesians gave them a confession, structure and credence to the young church. In 1999, the East Timorese voted to integrate into Indonesia or become a free state. East Timor became a young independent country. As a result, the Protestant church grew smaller, because the members was Indonesians. In 2000, the Australian Presbyterian World Mission (APWM) begun to form a relationship with the Protestant Church in East Timor. APWM found cooperation with the Protestant Church in East Timor difficult and discontinued all relations. The East Timor church had difficult times. They decided that the old church should minister in the "Eastern Kingdom", and the new church would minister in the "Southern and Western Kingdoms". This new church is the Evangelical Presbyterian Church in Timor Leste (East Timor) in 2008. The first moderator was Rev. Arlino Marcal, who ask the Australian Presbyterian Church for help. Seventeen congregations became part of the Evangelical Presbyterian Church (EPC). The new church building of Igreja Evangélica Presbiteriana Ebenezer de Dili, the headquarters of the Church in Timor Leste, was inaugurated in the district of Caicolí in the southern part of Dili on 28 March 2015.
