= Presbyterian Church El Redentor =

Church in Caracas, Venezuela

The Presbyterian Church El Redentor in Caracas decided to withdraw from the Presbyterian Church of Venezuela in 1983. It became charismatic, but uses the name Presbyterian. A small part of 60 people decided not to follow the move, and formed a new congregation. The church had difficulties but later grew and has two congregations and runs schools.
