= Biblical Fundamentalist Presbyterian Church in Chile =

Church in Chile

The Biblical Fundamentalist Presbyterian Church in Chile was founded in 1960, as a result of a fundamentalist fraction split from the National Presbyterian Church in Chile. The church adheres to the Apostles Creed and Westminster Confession. The denomination has 41 congregations and a Presbyterian church government.
