= Presbyterian Church in Korea (HapShin) =

- Classification: Protestant
- Orientation: Reformed
- Theology: Calvinist Evangelical
- Polity: Presbyterian
- Associations: Council of Presbyterian Churches in Korea
- Region: South Korea
- Origin: 1981
- Separated from: Presbyterian Church in Korea (HapDong)
- Congregations: 973 (2021)
- Members: 129,111 (2023)
- Official website: hapshin.org

The Presbyterian Church in Korea (HapShin) - in Korean 대한예수교장로회(합신) - is a Reformed denomination formed in South Korea in 1981, by a splinter group of the Presbyterian Church in Korea (HapDong).

== History ==
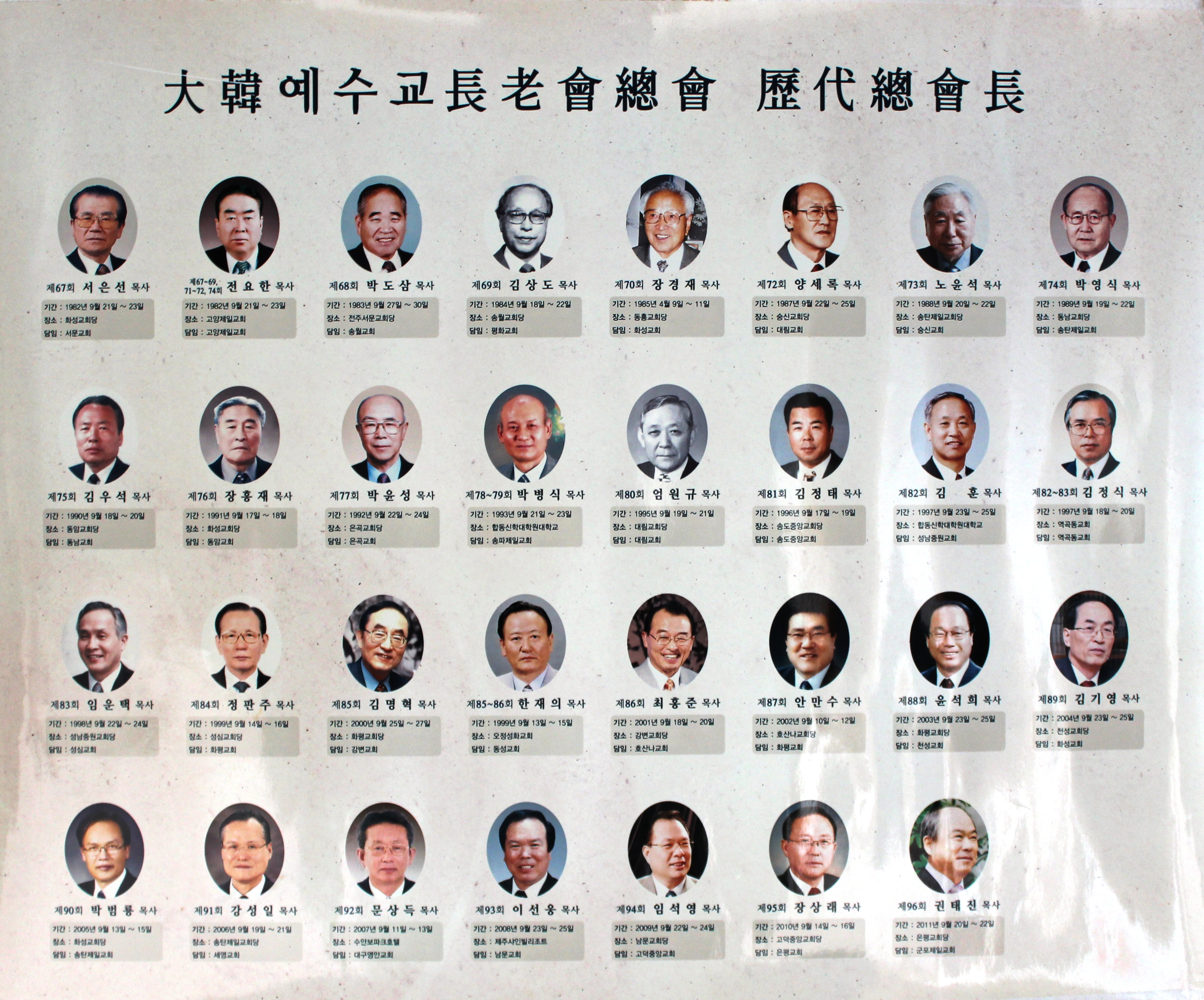
List of presidents of the Presbyterian Church in Korea (HapShin).

The Presbyterian Church in Korea (HapDong) faced internal conflicts in the 1970s and 1980s. As a result, the Presbyterian Church in Korea (BaekSeok) was formed in 1980 and the Presbyterian Church in Korea (GaeHyuk) in 1981 - in Korean 대한예수교 장로회(개혁).

In 1998, the GaeHyuk Church adopted the name Presbyterian Church in Korea (HapShin) - in Korean 대한예수교장로회(합신) - to avoid be confused with other denominations that use the name GaeHyuk in South Korea.

Since 2002, it has been in negotiations with the Kosin Presbyterian Church in Korea about a possible merger.

== Seminary ==
The denomination operates a seminary called the Hapdong Theological Seminary.

== Demographics ==
Year	Churches	Members
1998	445	89,617
2000	508	101,158
2002	716	123,279
2004	772	128,711
2006	778	144,974
2008	799	150,241
2010	852	156,508
2012	883	154,709
2014	899	149,969
2016	924	151,516
2018	958	146,898
2020	972	138,968
2021	973	134,531
2022	-	129,491
2023	-	129,111

Between 1998 and 2010 the denomination grew steadily, peaking at 156,508 members. However, since then, it has begun to decline in membership.

In 2017, the denomination had 151,742 members. However, in 2021, the denomination's statistics reported 14,531 members in 973 churches.

Despite the decline in membership, the number of churches has been growing steadily, as a result of new church planting with few members.

== Doctrine ==
The denomination subscribes to the Westminster Confession as a faithful exposition of biblical doctrine.

== Interchurch relations ==
The denomination is a member of the Council of Presbyterian Churches in Korea and has a corresponding relationship with the Presbyterian Church in America.

In 1989, it entered into an agreement with the Presbyterian Church in Japan.
