= Presbyterian Church of Ethiopia =

Presbyterian denomination in Ethiopia

Ethiopian Presbyterian Church
- Classification: Protestant
- Orientation: Reformed
- Theology: Calvinist
- Polity: Presbyterian
- Associations: Christian Reformed Church of North America (CRCNA) and Presbyterian Church of Australia
- Region: Ethiopia
- Origin: 1997; Ethiopia
- Separated from: Ethiopian Evangelical Church Mekane Yesus
- Congregations: 140 (2022)
- Members: 120,000 (2022)
- Official website: www.pcethiopia.com

The Presbyterian Church of Ethiopia (PCE) is a Presbyterian and Calvinist denomination in Ethiopia, officially founded in 1997 from communities originating from the former Bethel Evangelical Church of Ethiopia, when it was incorporated into the Ethiopian Evangelical Church Mekane Yesus.

The denomination has grown rapidly since its organization and, in 2024, represented about 0.6% of the country's population, according to research by Afrobarometer.

== History ==
Presbyterianism in Ethiopia began with the founding of "Bethel Evangelical Church of Ethiopia" was founded by American missionaries in the first half of the 20th century.

This church grew significantly, especially during the 20th century, and was later incorporated into the Ethiopian Evangelical Church Mekane Yesus, a United Churches denomination of Lutheran-Reformed theology that became one of the largest Protestant churches in Africa.

However, in 1997, several leaders and communities wishing to preserve the Presbyterian identity and theology reorganized as the "Presbyterian Church of Ethiopia" ("Presbyterian Church of Ethiopia"). Ethiopia). The founding pastors were Ethiopians Fikre H. Norcha, Solomon Gossaye, Fresenbet Beser, and Tessema Bekele, as well as Jo Changhyun Jo, a Korean Presbyterian missionary.

Since then, the new denomination has expanded to various regions of the country, maintaining an emphasis on evangelism, Christian education, and social assistance. The church also founded a theological seminary in Addis Ababa and maintains active missions in urban and rural areas.

In 2017, it was estimated that the church had 75,000 members in 139 churches.

In 2022, the denomination reported having 120,000 members in 140 churches.

According to the Afrobarometer, in 2024, approximately 0.6% of the Ethiopian population identified as Presbyterian. Considering the Ethiopian population of approximately 122 million in 2024, this corresponds to about 730,000 people who identify as Presbyterian.

== Doctrine ==
The denomination professes faith in the Calvinist and Reformed traditions. It recognizes as its confessions of faith the Apostles' Creed and the Nicene Creed, in addition to the historic Reformed confessions.

The Church maintains a conservative biblical theology and emphasizes the authority of Scripture, the sovereign grace of God, and the centrality of the preaching of the Gospel.

== Inter-ecclesiastical relations ==
=== In Ethiopia ===
In July 2010, the Presbyterian Church of Ethiopia, along with the Ethiopian Reformed Presbyterian Church (formed by missions of the Orthodox Presbyterian Church), and the Ethiopian Evangelical Bethel Church, formed the Ethiopian Evangelical Presbyterian Federation (EEPF), with the goal of fostering cooperation among the Presbyterian churches in the country.

=== International relations ===
The Presbyterian Church of Ethiopia maintains official relations with the Christian Reformed Church of North America (CRCNA), which cooperates in theological and missionary training programs.

The denomination is also a partner of the Presbyterian Church of Australia through the missionary organization Australian Presbyterian World Mission (APWM), which supports evangelistic projects and the training of local leaders.
