= St. Andrew's Presbyterian Church in Bermuda =

Catholic church in bermuda

St. Andrew's Presbyterian Church in Bermuda, located in Hamilton, is a congregation affiliated with the Presbyterian Church in Canada, in the Presbytery of West Toronto.

It was formed in 1843 with the help of Christ Church in Warwick. The first preacher was Rev. James Morrison. The sanctuary was built in 1846. In 1873 the church petitioned the Presbytery of Halifax to send pastors. In 1875 the Presbyterian Church in Canada was formed and it became a part of that denomination. The Westminster Confession is the official confession of Faith.
