= Presbyterian Church in America, Chile =

Presbyterian denomination

The Presbyterian Church in America, Chile (in Spanish the Iglesia Presbiteriana en América, Chile) is a confessional Presbyterian denomination, created by the Presbyterian Church in America missionaries and it currently has 5 congregations.

== Origin ==
In the late 1980s, the Presbyterian Church in America decided to do missionary work in Chile. They wanted to establish new congregations instead of working with existing ones, the PCA missionaries departed from the Presbytery of the National Presbyterian Church in Chile. The PCA missionaries have been successful in establishing several new congregations especially in key areas such as Santiago, Chile, Osorno and Vina del Mar, Chile where new church projects are underway.

In Santiago, Chile they founded the English-speaking San Marcos Church. The English speakers come from 11 different countries.

There is a Spanish speaking sister church Iglesia Cristo Rey(Christ the King Church).

In Viña del Mar the Presbyterian Church of Renaca was established with session and diaconate. Two mission status churches were established in April 2011. The vision is to create a presbytery in the region.

The National Presbytery of Chile that was formed has 6 churches and 4 church plants stretching from Northern Chile to Valdivia in the southern Region. A Reformed Bible Institute was also established in Santiago.

In 2014, a new church was born in southern Chile, Iglesia Cristo Rey in Chillan.

== Theology and seminary ==
A Theological Academy was established to train pastors and ministers in the Presbyterian Church in America, Chile.

The denomination adheres to the historic Presbyterian confessions:

- Apostles Creed
- Westminster Confession of Faith
- Westminster Shorter Catechism
- Westminster Larger Catechism

The church adheres to the 5 Solas:

- Sola Scriptura
- Sola Fide
- Solus Christus
- Sola Gratia
- Soli Deo Gloria

== Churches ==
- Iglesia Presbiteriana de Reñaca - Reñaca Presbyterian Church
- Iglesia Reformada de Maipú - Maipú Reformed Church
- Iglesia Cristo Rey - Christ the King Church
- Iglesia de Valle - Valley Church
- Iglesia Presbiteriana de Osorno - Osorno Presbyterian Church
- Iglesia Cristo Rey, Chillan
- Iglesia Presbiteriana de Viña del Mar
- San Marcos Church (English Speaking Congregation)
- Presbytery of the South
