= Free Evangelical Church =

The Free Evangelical Church was formed as a result of the split in the Evangelical Church in New Caledonia and the Loyalty Islands. Its leader was Raymond Chaelemagne a missionary in the Kanak people. The Paris Evangelical Missionary Society asked him to return to Paris, but numerous teachers and supporters asked him to stay. This created the split. Ministers are men only. It has 74 parishes and 2,000 members. Reconciliation with The Evangelical Church in New Caledonia began in 1992.
