= Korean Presbyterian Church of Brazil =

Christian denomination

The Korean Presbyterian Church of Brazil was founded by Korean immigrants belonging to the Presbyterian Church in Korea (HapDong). The first missionary was Pastor Sung Man Kim. He served the Han-In church in São Paulo. In 2004 the denomination had 7 organised congregations and 8 preaching points. Membership is around 1,800–2,000. It began missionary work among Brazilians. Official languages are Korean and Portuguese. The church subscribes the Apostles Creed and Westminster Confession.

== See also ==
- Bethesda Korean Presbyterian Church in Brazil
