= South Sudan Evangelical Presbyterian Church =

- Classification: Protestant
- Orientation: Reformed
- Theology: Calvinist
- Polity: Presbyterian
- Associations: World Council of Churches, All Africa Conference of Churches and South Sudan Council of Churches
- Region: South Sudan
- Origin: 2011; South Sudan
- Separated from: Sudan Evangelical Presbyterian Church
- Branched from: Evangelical Church of Egypt (Synod of the Nile)
- Congregations: 30 (2017)
- Members: 50,000 (2025)

The South Sudan Evangelical Presbyterian Church (SSEPC) is a Reformed Presbyterian Christian denomination in South Sudan. The church originated in American Presbyterian missionary work in the former Sudan and became an independent denomination in 2011, following the independence of South Sudan.

== History ==
=== Origins in Sudan ===
In 1902, the Rev. Kelly Giffen and H. T. McLaughlin established the first Presbyterian congregation in Khartoum. In subsequent years, missionary activity gradually shifted toward southern Sudan, with responsibility for the mission work eventually entrusted to the Evangelical Church of Egypt (Synod of the Nile).

Over time, the Presbyterian mission expanded in both northern and southern regions of Sudan and developed into a nationally organized church body, the Sudan Evangelical Presbyterian Church. By 2004, the denomination comprised 24 congregations with approximately 8,000 members.

=== Formation of the South Sudan church ===
Following the independence of South Sudan in 2011, the congregations located within the new nation reorganized as a separate denomination, adopting the name South Sudan Evangelical Presbyterian Church.

By 2017, the denomination reportedly consisted of around 30 congregations and administered the Nile Theological College in Juba.

Missionaries from the Presbyterian Church (USA) continued to serve in South Sudan until at least 2022, assisting the church in leadership development and institutional growth.

== Religious persecution ==
Despite the independence of South Sudan, members of the denomination have continued to face religious persecution in Sudan. On December 14, 2014, a pastor of the church was imprisoned after preaching at a church in Khartoum North.

In December of 2015, two pastors belonging to the denomination were released from detention in Sudan following international advocacy.

== Social work ==
The South Sudan Evangelical Presbyterian Church is involved in social and humanitarian initiatives, particularly in response to armed conflict and communal violence in South Sudan. Its activities include trauma healing programs, training of community facilitators, and pastoral care for displaced and vulnerable populations.

== Organization and affiliations ==
The denomination became a member of the World Council of Churches in 2025, at which time it reported approximately 50,000 members.

It is also a member of the All Africa Conference of Churches and the South Sudan Council of Churches.

Although it is not a member of the World Communion of Reformed Churches, the denomination maintains dialogue and cooperation with the organization.

== Doctrine ==
The South Sudan Evangelical Presbyterian Church subscribes to the Westminster Confession of Faith, as well as the Apostles' Creed and the Nicene Creed, reflecting its Reformed Presbyterian theological tradition.
