= Église Protestante Reformée du Burundi =

Christian denomination in Burundi

The Église Protestante Reformée du Burundi (EPRB) is a conservative Reformed denomination in Burundi. The Christian Reformed Church (CGK) of the Netherlands has a continuing relationship with the EPRB, holding yearly seminars in Burundi, if possible, and supporting students with bursaries. As of 2014, the church claims 1530 members across 10 parishes.

EPRB Kamenge parishioners founded and operate a Christian nursery school named Maranatha. The EPRB also maintains a Job Center in the city of Makamba.

== History ==
The EPRB claims to have been legally established in January 2000 by M. Ferdinand Ntancuti. By 2003, it was a small group led by Rev. J. Bararu. In the summer of 2008, Rev. Bararu, who had previously been a member of CGK Culemborg, asked his Dutch contacts for assistance growing the church. In response, a group of Dutch theologians, pioneered by Rev. L. den Butter, traveled to Bujumbura (the largest city in and then-capital of Burundi) in Oct 2010, to educate pastors, elders and deacons.

In 2012, due to a schism Rev. Bararu departed and was succeeded by Rev. I. Nimpagaritse. By 2013, Bararu was accused of stealing missionary money from the CGK churches, and a suit was laid against him. Later in 2012, a Synod was formed to decide an issue of doctrine, administration, or application. In 2013, the foundation stones of a new church building were laid in Kamenge, a Bujumbura suburb.

An October 2016 issue regarding the issuance of visas for a trip to the Netherlands shook the church, causing a lot of bad blood. This caused the cancellation of the yearly CGK visit in 2017. Later that year, a special synod was held to resolve issues within the church and Rev. Nimparagiste became chairman of the Synod.
