= Dutch Reformed Church - Synod Central Africa =

The Synod Central Africa is a regional governing body in the Dutch Reformed Church in South Africa in Zimbabwe. In 1895 3 congregations were established in what was then known as Rhodesia. The number of congregations increased rapidly, theses was part of the Cape Synod, later the Free State Synod and the Transvaal Synod. Finally the Dutch Reformed Church - Synod Central Africa ( the Nederduitse Gereformeerde Kerk - Sinode van Midde-Afrika in Afrikaans) become autonomous in 1957. It has 16 congregations, 41 house fellowships and 2,600 members. Official languages are English and Afrikaans. The Apostles Creed, Athanasian Creed, Canons of Dort, Heidelberg Catechism, Belgic Confession is generally accepted standards.

The Synod composed of white people, mostly Afrikaans and the services are in Dutch too. While the Reformed Church in Zimbabwe is a black denomination. These churches are created by Dutch Reformed missionaries from South Africa.
