= Association of Evangelical Churches in Burkina Faso =

The Association of Evangelical Churches in Burkina Faso was founded in 1931 by the Sudan Interior Mission. The church is concentrated in the eastern part of the country, this is because migration has spread other parts of the country. In 2004 it had 80,000 members and 334 congregations. It is a Reformed denomination, and congregational church government.
