= Presbyterian Synod of Southwest Guatemala =

The Presbyterian Synod of Southwest Guatemala (Spanish: Sinodo Evangelico Presbiteriano Sur Oeste de Guatemala) was separated from the National Evangelical Presbyterian Church of Guatemala in 1993. These churches are in court dispute over ownership of land and properties. The synod was applied membership to the AIPRAL in 1994, and was denied. The Synod was the founding member of CLIR, the Confederacao Latinamericana de Igrejas Reformadas, a more conservative counterpart of the AIPRAL (Alliance of Latin American Presbyterian and Reformed Churches). The church has 6,540 members. It adheres to the Apostles Creed and Westminster Confession.
