= United Presbyterian Church of Vietnam =

- Classification: Protestant
- Orientation: Reformed
- Theology: Calvinist
- Polity: Presbyterian
- Associations: Vietnam Evangelical Alliance
- Region: Vietnam
- Origin: 1988
- Branched from: Presbyterian Church (USA)
- Congregations: 120 (2012)
- Members: 7,500 (2012)
- Official website: upcv.org

The United Presbyterian Church of Vietnam (UPCV) is a Presbyterian denomination, established in Vietnam in 1988 by Pastor Ho Tan Khoa.

== History ==
In 1996, from a mission by a Korean-American pastor, a Christian group emerged in Ho Chi Minh City. One of the group's members, Ho Tan Khoa, became pastor and founded the United Presbyterian Church of Vietnam in 1998. However, at the time, the denomination was not allowed by the government of Vietnam. As such, it spread with a network of house churches.

The denomination asked the Presbyterian Church (USA) to help train and train pastors, which began in 2002.

In 2010, the denomination reported suffering religious persecution by the authorities in Vietnam.

In 2012, the denomination had 120 congregations and 7,500 members.

== Inter-church Relations ==
The denomination is a founding member of the Evangelical Alliance of Vietnam, which in 2012 elected Rev. Ho Tan Khoa (also president of the IPUV) as its president.

In addition, it receives help from the Presbyterian Church (USA) and Presbyterian Church of Taiwan.
