= United Evangelical Church in Angola =

Protestant church that separated from the Evangelical Reformed Church in Angola

- Classification: Evangelical Protestant
- Orientation: Calvinism
- Founder: Rev. Domingos Alexandre
- Region: Angola
- Separated from: Evangelical Reformed Church in Angola
- Members: 2,200
- Places of worship: 11

The United Evangelical Church in Angola separated from the Evangelical Reformed Church in Angola. It had 2,200 members in 11 congregations as of 2004.
