= New Life Presbyterian Church =

Presbyterian church in Uganda

- Classification: Protestant
- Orientation: Reformed
- Polity: Presbyterian
- Associations: Presbyterian Church in America (partnership)
- Region: Western Uganda and Uganda–DR Congo border region
- Language: Rutooro; Lubhwisi; Rukonjo
- Headquarters: Uganda
- Founder: World Harvest Mission
- Origin: 1986; Fort Portal, Uganda
- Congregations: 2 (2004)
- Members: 1,000 (2004)

The New Life Presbyterian Church was founded by the World Harvest Mission in 1986, working with Ugandan Christian. The first congregation was located in Fort Portal in 1986, and the second congregation in 1992 in Bundibugyo. The church reports growing church planting across western Uganda and the Congolese border. It had two congregations and 25 house fellowships with 1,000 members in 2004. The Westminster Confession of Faith and the Apostles Creed are the official confessions. Official languages are Rutooro, Lubhwisi and Rukonjo.

The church has partnership relations with a PCA church in North Carolina.

== See also ==
- Reformed Presbyterian Church of Uganda
- Presbyterian Church in Uganda
