= Reformed Churches of Myanmar =

Christian denomination

The Reformed Churches of Myanmar (RCM) is a small Reformed denomination in Myanmar. It is mainly concentrated in the Chin hills area of Burma. Presently it has 12 congregations in small villages. This denomination is a mission of the Evangelical Reformed Fellowship. The Reformed Churches of Myanmar is a member of the Reformed and Presbyterian Fellowship in Myanmar.
