= Bastion of Truth Reformed Churches in the Philippines =

Bastion of Truth Reformed Churches in the Philippines (BTRC)
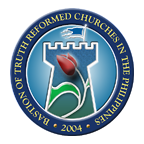
- Classification: Protestant
- Orientation: Conservative Calvinistic
- Theology: Evangelical Reformed
- Polity: Presbyterian
- Region: The Philippines
- Origin: 2004; Quezon City, Philippines
- Separated from: Church of the Foursquare Gospel in the Philippines
- Congregations: 4 (Antipolo, Rizal; Batasan Hills, Quezon City; Lucban, Quezon Province; San Jose, Batangas)

The Bastion of Truth Reformed Churches is a Christian denomination located in Southern Luzon, Philippines.

== Origin ==
In April 2004, representatives from three former Pentecostal-Charismatic churches and a group with an Arminian Baptist background convened to establish a separate denomination of Reformed Churches. This new denomination, Bastion of Truth Reformed Churches (BTRC), follows the theological tradition of the 16th-century Protestant Reformation.

Its formation arose from doctrinal conflicts within the Church of the Foursquare Gospel in the Philippines, a Pentecostal-Charismatic and fundamentally Arminian denomination founded in the United States by Aimee Semple McPherson. The primary theological dispute centered on God's sovereignty in salvation, particularly regarding the believer's perseverance in faith until the end, as well as the biblical practice of Christ-centered preaching. The Foursquare denomination ultimately rejected both doctrines. These Reformed (Calvinistic) ideals gradually influenced one of the denomination's Bible colleges through exposure to Reformed literature and a growing awareness of church history, particularly the Protestant Reformation. Pastor Ronald R. Santos—the Associate Pastor at Capitol City Foursquare Church and director and instructor at Foursquare Bible College of Quezon City—stood for the Reformed doctrines and refused to retract said beliefs, opting to resign his office. As the doctrinal divide deepened, other pastors resigned from their positions, while several Bible college students abandoned their ministerial training.

== Beliefs ==
The Bastion of Truth Reformed Churches profess God's only and true Gospel of "sovereign particular irresistible grace", which is his "power" of salvation of those who believe (Romans 1:16, 17; 1 Corinthians 15:1, 2).

The churches acknowledge that the bearer of the Gospel in the last 450 years is the historic Reformed faith, proclaimed by Reformed and Presbyterian churches holding fast to the faith of the church. The BTRCs identify themselves as "Reformed" churches, although the term "Reformed" has been claimed by many apostate modern Protestant churches. Their reasons for holding to the Reformed faith are bound within the historical circumstances of the Protestant Reformation of the sixteenth century.

== Church Government ==
The doctrinal standards, church government, and worship of the Bastion of Truth Reformed Churches are set forth in their Church Order. However, the church believes in the priesthood of all believers, maintaining that God calls certain men (Romans 10:14, 15; 1 Timothy 3:1-13) through the church to fulfill the tasks of the distinct Biblical offices. Office-bearers are required to subscribe to this church order. The denomination holds to the Presbyterian form of church government and convenes on significant occasions as a single classis. The BTRCs emphasize that each congregation is self-governed by a body of elders chosen out of the congregation in compliance with the principle of the "autonomy of the local congregation". Hence, the name of the denomination is not "Church" (singular), but "Churches" (plural). The BTRCs do not allow women to be preachers, elders, or deacons.

== Worship ==
The church uses a simple liturgy—consisting of prayer, singing, preaching, and giving. As a matter of biblical principle, the BTRCs do not entertain in their worship services. As a church that derives from Pentecostalism/Charismatics, they denounce human-centered and entertainment-motivated styles of worship. For this reason, the BTRCs practice the Biblical heritage of Psalm singing without the accompaniment of musical instruments.
