= Union Presbyterian Church in Korea =

Presbyterian Church

The Union Presbyterian Church in Korea was organised in 1990 when Mok Presbytery was organised. Later it changed its name to YunHap Assembly. In 1992 it was constituted as a church. It has almost 11,000 members and 20 congregations in 2004. The Westminster Confession is generally accepted.
