= Protestant Church of West Kalimantan =

The Protestant Church of West Kalimantan (Gereja Protestan Kalimantan Barat) is located in West Kalimantan, Indonesia. The church was founded in 1963 and grew slowly until outreach to the Dayak community in the 1990s. The church had 6,600 members and 20 congregations in 2004, and has women officers. The Protestant Church in Kalimantan Barat has a Presbyterian church government.
