= Evangelical Congregational Churches in Paraguay =

The Evangelical Congregational Churches in Paraguay was a missionary effort of the Congregational churches in Brazil primarily among Brazilian farmers in the border area of Brazil and Paraguay. The governance recognised the denomination in Paraguay, but churches are part of the Brazilian denomination Evangelical Congregational Churches in Paraguay, starting in 1970. In Paraguay, there are 10 congregations and 40 house fellowships with 2,000 members in 2004.
