= Reformed Church of Mozambique (Mphatso Synod) =

The Reformed Church of Mozambique (Mphatso Synod) was founded in the 1970s by Reverend Nehemia Katundu and Reverend Botha. They were missionaries that were sent to Mozambique by Nkhoma Synod to set up a Reformed Church. There are now 3 Synods, 4 Presbyteries in Tete, and 4 in Zambesia and 70,000 members. Official languages are Portuguese, Lomwe and Chichewa. The Synod affirms the Apostles Creed, Belgic Confession, the Heidelberg Catechism and the Canons of Dort. The Christian Reformed Church in North America supports the Synod.
