= Evangelical Congregational Church in Brazil =

The Evangelical Congregational Church in Brazil is a Reformed congregational denomination in Brazil. It was founded by congregationalist missionaries from Argentina begun to work in Brazil in Rio Grande do Sul. The church become autonomous in 1942 and spread across nearly all states. In the 1970s, mission outreach was founded in Paraguay. Women play important role in the life of the church but are not ordained. In 2004 there was 42,000 members in 52 congregations and 375 house fellowships. According to the church's statistics the denomination has 221 congregations, 117 preaching points. Ac Official languages are German, Spanish and Portuguese.
