= Indonesian Christian Church of North Sumatera =

The Indonesian Christian Church of North Sumatera (Indonesian: Gereja Kristen Indonesia Sumatera Utara or GKI Sumut) is a Reformed denomination in Indonesia. It was founded by the Dutch Reformed Church in 1915. The Dutch left in 1957. In 1969 the Synod was formed. It is a Presbyterian church. In 1970 it had 5,000 members 4 pastors and 16 evangelists, 12 congregations and 56 places of worship. Formerly it was known as the Gereja-Gereja Gereformeerd Synode Sumatera Utara. Today the denomination has 90 congregations and 12,000 members.
