= Korean Presbyterian Church (GaeHyuk I.) =

South Korean Christian denomination

The Korean Presbyterian Church (GaeHyuk I.) was formed in 1981, when it was separated from the Presbyterian Church in Korea (HapDong). In 1973 before HapDong was divided, about 400 neutral congregations formed a 17-member committee to promote reconciliation, but this effort proved useless. The non-mainline HapDong group separated and fragmented into JongAm and BangBae and GaeHyuk. An attempt was made to unite these churches without success. The GaeHyuk denomination was officially founded in 1981. The Apostles' Creed and the Westminster Confession are the officially accepted standards. In 2004 the denomination had 633,600 members and 2,030 congregations served by 2,010 ordained pastors in 31 presbyteries and a General Assembly. There is currently no female ordination.

== Controversies ==
The Korean Presbyterian Church (GaeHyuk I.) has declared its separation from the Darakbang movement; however, controversy remains as some pastors from the movement still remain within the denomination. Future attention is needed regarding the denomination's theological identity and commitment to reformation.
