= Renewed Presbyterian Church in Mozambique =

The Renewed Presbyterian Church in Mozambique was founded by the missionaries of the Renewed Presbyterian Church in Brazil. The first General Assembly was in 2010. Churches can be found in Sofala, Tete, Manica, Zambezia and Maputo Provinces with 8,700 members and 128 congregations. The headquarters located in Beira, Sofala. According to the 2013 statistics the church had 243 pastors, 203 evangelists, 16,795 members and 217 congregations.
