= Evangelical Reformed Church (Westminster Confession) =

Calvinist denomination

The Evangelical Reformed Church (Westminster Confession) is a small Calvinist denomination with 5 congregations in Austria and in Switzerland. It is in part a fruit of the missionary work of the Reformed Churches in the Netherlands (Liberated). In 1984, the first congregation was established in Neuhofen an der Krems, Austria. In 1998, a congregation was founded in Rankweil, followed later at Winterthur in 2005, at Basel in 2008, and at the bilingual (German and English) Vienna congregation New City Wien in 2009 was started with the help of World Harvest Mission/Serge. Total membership is around 150. Some churches in the denomination receive financial support from the Dutch organization SSRO. The Westminster Confession (1647) is the doctrinal basis of the denomination, together with the Heidelberg Catechism.
