= Traditional Presbyterian Church in Brazil =

The Traditional Presbyterian Church in Brazil was founded on September 12, 1992. It separated from the Presbyterian Church of Brazil due to concerns about the charismatic teachings and liturgical practices of that denomination. The Traditional Presbyterian Church subscribes to the Westminster Confession of Faith and prohibits the use of instrumental music during worship, with the exception of the piano. Additionally, it does not allow the lifting of hands, speaking in tongues, or wearing strange vestments. Bible study plays an important role in the church.
