= Luwu Indonesian Protestant Church =

- GPIL
- Gereja Protestan Injili Luwu
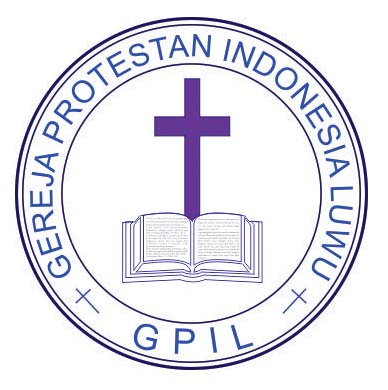
- Location: Luwu, Sulawesi
- Country: Indonesia
- Denomination: Presbyterian

History
- Founded: 6 February 1966

The Luwu Indonesian Protestant Church (locally called the Gereja Protestan Injili Luwu or GPIL) is a member of the Protestant Church in Indonesia centered around the Luwu Regency.

== History ==
The first Christian missionary was placed in Luwu in 1930. Missionary work was primarily done in the mountainous regions due to prior Islamization of the coastal plain. However, a 1949 Islamist insurgency against the central government forced some Christian congregations to relocate to the coastal areas. Following the insurgency, the number of Christians in the area grew due to immigration from surrounding regions. The GPIL was formed after several congregations split from the Toraja Church in 1965. It marks its official date of formation as 6 February 1966.

== Organization ==
In the year 2000, the church had roughly 17,000 members in 159 congregations. It follows a Presbyterian organizational structure, with its congregations divided into six Classis: Nasakke, Lebang, Lambara, Kerepansu, Tabarano and Kalaena.
