= Free Presbyterian Church of Nepal =

- Classification: Protestant
- Orientation: Reformed and Evangelical
- Theology: Confessional, Conservative and Calvinist
- Polity: Presbyterian
- Moderator: Paul Thapa
- Region: Nepal
- Founder: Paul Thapa
- Origin: 2003
- Branched from: Free Presbyterian Church of Ulster
- Congregations: 100 (2015)

The Free Presbyterian Church of Nepal (FPCN) is a Reformed Presbyterian conservative founded in Nepal in 2003 by missionaries from the Free Presbyterian Church of Ulster.

== History ==
In 2003, Rev. Paul Thapa and his wife, Mandira, were sent by the Free Presbyterian Church of Ulster to serve as missionaries in Nepal.

At first, an orphanage was formed and several children converted to Christianity.

Later, the denomination began broadcasting evangelistic messages through a radio station.

From the growth in membership, on November 29, 2013, 22 Nepalese pastors were ordained and the following day the Presbytery of the Free Presbyterian Church of Nepal was officially organized.

The Rev. Paul Thapa, founder of the denomination, was elected its moderator.

Due to the rapid growth, in 2015, the denomination was already formed by about 100 churches.

== Doctrine ==
The denomination subscribes to the Westminster Confession of Faith and does not permit ordination of women. In addition, it stands out for allowing its churches to opt for paedobaptism or credobaptism and for requiring abstinence from alcohol.
