= Korean Reformed Church in the Netherlands =

The Korean Reformed Church in the Netherlands is an ethnic Korean denomination from various Presbyterian churches, the Korean congregation was founded in 1983. It cooperates with the Reformed Churches in the Netherlands, which offers church building for worship. The Korean Reformed Church has approximately 150-200 members. The Apostles Creed, Nicene Creed and the Heidelberg Catechism are the official confessions.
