= Korean Presbyterian Church in Costa Rica =

The Korean Presbyterian Church in Costa Rica was planted by Rev. Chang Hak Kwen. In 1982, it adopted the name the Korean Church. The same year Rev. Yong Guel Choi from California organised the church. In 1985 it adopted the name Korean Presbyterian Church. In 1992 a church building was dedicated. In 1995 the church slit. The church affirms the Apostles Creed, Nicene Creed and Westminster Confession.
