= Free Presbyterian Church of Scotland in Zimbabwe =

The Free Presbyterian Church of Scotland in Zimbabwe was a mission of the Free Presbyterian Church of Scotland started in 1904. In 1995 there were 30 congregations, and 4000 affiliate members. The leaders were Rev. John Bayana Radasi and Rev Aaron Ndebele.

The head mission office located in Bulawayo. It runs the Mbuma Mission Hospital. It adheres to the Westminster Confession.
