= Church of Christ in Indonesia =

Reformed denomination in Indonesia

The Church of Christ in Indonesia, Gereja Kristus, is a Reformed denomination in Indonesia. Its mission began in the 19th century as a work among Chinese immigrants. In conjunction with Dutch immigrants, small congregations began to develop in cities throughout Java. In 1905, the Episcopal Methodist Church also started working in Java. The denomination was officially formed, as the Chinese Christian Church (Tiong Hoa Kie Tok Kauw Hwee) in 1939, then renamed itself after Indonesian independence as Gereja Kristus. It was reported by Reformiet Online (at an uncertain date) as having 17 congregations and approximately 18,000 members, predominantly from West and East Java in addition to Southern Sumatra and Jakarta.
