= Canaan Christian Community Church in Gambia =

Korean church in the Gambia

The Canaan Christian Community Church in Gambia was founded by a missionary of the Presbyterian Church in Korea (HapDong), namely Rev. Jae Hwan Lee. He organised a congregation in Brikama, but later more Korean missionaries arrived and another church was established in Somita. A small Bible college was established.
