= Presbyterian Church in Cambodia =

- Classification: Protestant
- Orientation: Reformed
- Theology: Calvinist
- Polity: Presbyterian
- Region: Cambodia
- Origin: 1993
- Branched from: Presbyterian Church in Korea (HapDong), Presbyterian Church in Korea (TongHap) and Presbyterian Church in Singapore
- Congregations: 136 (2019)
- Members: 5,876 (2019)

The Presbyterian Church in Cambodia or Presbyterian Church of Cambodia (PCC), officially Synod Presbyterian Church in Cambodia, is a denomination Reformed Presbyterian, founded in Cambodia, in 1993, by Korean Presbyterian missionaries and the Presbyterian Church in Singapore.

== History ==
In 1993, Korean Presbyterian missionaries began church planting work in Cambodia. From then on, missionaries from Presbyterian Church in Korea (HapDong), Presbyterian Church in Korea (TongHap) and other Korean Presbyterian denominations arrived in the country. On July 9, 2003, missionaries created the Council of the Presbyterian Church in Cambodia, whose objective was the establishment of a single Presbyterian denomination in the country, without reflecting the divisions among Korean Presbyterians in the mission.

In 2009, the Presbyterian Theological Institute of Cambodia was organized to train national pastors.

On July 9, 2013, the first presbytery was formed and in January 2015, the presbytery unfolded, leading to the constitution of the Synod of the denomination.

In 2019, the denomination already had 136 churches and 5,876 members.

== Doctrine ==
The PCC subscribes to the Westminster Confession of Faith, Westminster Larger Catechism and Westminster Shorter Catechism.

== Interchurch Relations ==
The denomination has strong relationships with the Presbyterian Church in Singapore.
