= Africa Gospel Unity Church =

African Baptist church

The Africa Gospel Unity Church was founded in 1964 by a pastor who left the National Holiness Mission. The Africa Gospel Unity Church adheres to the 1689 Baptist Confession of Faith. Most congregations are in rural areas. The church's leadership is all-male. In 2004, there were 3,500 members in eighty congregations and eighty house fellowships.

== History of the church ==
The AGUC was formed in 1964 by a pastor who left the National Holiness Mission after a dispute over administrative matters. Fellowship in 1970 with the EACA and the ICCC, in touch with missionaries of the IBPFM and with Ref theology. A group of younger pastors, trained at the Bible College of East Africa, were instrumental in reforming the church in 1982 and rewriting its constitution. The AGUC maintains the Baptist Confession of Faith (1689). Most of the congregation are in rural areas, but churches have been opened in Nairobi, Eldoret, Nakuru, and other cities and towns in Kenya. Churches have also spread to Tanzania. The need for worship places within walking distance has been met by establishing numerous preaching stations and training additional lay preachers. Two-thirds of Sunday worshipers are not communicant members yet. Every month each regional council holds an "evangelistic outreach" in which visits are made from house to house.

== Church statistics ==
- Members
  - Total: 3500
  - Admitted to participate in the Lord's Supper: 2000
  - Baptised: 2000
- Parishes (conventionally): 80
- House fellowships (Number of growing parishes): 80
- Ordained clergy
  - Total: 11
  - Men: 11
  - No women's ordination
- Elders/Presbyters
  - Total: 95
  - Men: 95
- Deacons
  - Total: 160
  - Men: 130
  - Women: 30
- Missionaries: 0 (missionaries do not work abroad)
- Baptismal practice: Believer's Baptism
- Godparents: no godparents
- Lord's Supper: Frequency per annum: 4
- Theological training facilities: 1
- Founded in: 1964
- Organizational structures: local church, district, region, and central church councils
- Official languages: English, Swahili
- Languages during church services: English, Swahili
- Confessions: Apostles' Creed

== Location ==
AGUC, P.O. Box 33, 20400 Bomet, Kenya (Africa), Address-No.: 1394 / 1069
