= Hill Tracts Presbyterian Church =

Christian denomination in Bangladesh

The Hill Tracts Presbyterian Kawhmi is a Christian denomination in Bangladesh. It comes from a work started in 1918 by the Welsh missionary Rev. Edwin Rowland. The North East India Mission was responsible for the work. The first conversions took place in 1926, and the first church building was opened in 1929. In 1968, the Evangelical Christian Church become self-supporting. After several splits occurred, the Hill Tracts Presbyterian Church was formed in 1980. It has no official affiliation with any other denominations abroad. It had 2,236 members in 26 congregations.
