= Presbyterian Church in Korea (YeJangHapBo) =

The Presbyterian Church in Korea (YeJangHapBo) is a Christian denomination created as the result of bringing together various Hapdong groups, both mainline and non-mainline. In 1980 No Jin-Young from the mainline group, You Je-Shun, Son Chi-So from the neutral group and Bak Dong-Sup from the non-mainline faction created HapDongBoSu. Later it was renamed to YeJangHapBo. It has 187,500 members and 300 congregations in 16 Presbyteries and a General Assembly.

The Apostles Creed and Westminster Confession is generally accepted in YeJangHapBo.
