= Reformed Church in Venezuela =

Church in Venezuela

The Reformed Church in Venezuela (Iglesia Reformada en Venezuela in Spanish) was founded in 1985. Pastor César Rodriguez rediscovered the truth of the Reformed faith and, with the help of two friends, founded a confessional Reformed church in Barquisimeto. The church has 4 congregations, 200 professed members, and 100 baptized members. Sister church relations with the Reformed Churches in the Netherlands (Liberated) was established in 1993. The church is a member of the Latin American branch of the World Reformed Fellowship. Theological institutions were organised and relationships between the denomination and the churches in Curacao established.

== Theology ==
- Apostles Creed
- Canons of Dort
- Heidelberg Catechism
- Westminster Confession of Faith
