= Reformed Presbyterian Church in Japan =

The Reformed Presbyterian Church in Japan (Japanese: 日本キリスト改革長老教会 Nihon Kirisuto Kaikaku Chōrō Kyōkai) was founded in 1950 by the Reformed Presbyterian Church of North America. The church started the work in Kobe. The church was part of the Presbyterian church in the United States, but gained independence since then. It has 7 congregations and affirms the Westminster Confession, Westminster Larger Catechism and Westminster Shorter Catechism.
