= Arab Evangelical Church of São Paulo =

Church in São Paulo, Brazil

Coordinates: 23°34′42″S 46°38′24″W

The Arab Evangelical Church of São Paulo is a Baptist Evangelical church in São Paulo. It is affiliated with the Brazilian Baptist Convention.

== History ==
It was established in 1935, by a Lebanese pastor in São Paulo. He set a preaching point in Goias. It dedicated its own church building in 1979. It had in 2004 1 parish with 3 preaching points. It was a member of the World Fellowship of Reformed Churches until 2015, when it became a member of the Brazilian Baptist Convention.
