= Sylhet Presbyterian Synod =

- Classification: Protestant
- Orientation: Reformed Evangelicalism
- Theology: Calvinism
- Polity: Presbyterian
- Associations: Presbyterian Church of Wales
- Region: Bangladesh
- Origin: 1905
- Congregations: 87 (2004)
- Members: 5.549 (2004)

The Sylhet Presbyterian Synod was founded by Welsh missionaries in 1905. It has its roots in Greater Sylhet District, which was located in northeastern Bangladesh. When Bangladesh separated, it was cut off from Northeastern India, the parent body. Members belong to the minority groups like Khasi, Garo and Santal. It consist of four presbyteries and one synod. It maintains schools, outreach programs and women's program. In 2004, the denomination had 7,276 members and 87 congregations and 38 house fellowships. There are no women ordination.

A member of the National Christian Fellowship of Bangladesh.
