= Presbyterian Church in Guinea-Bissau =

The Presbyterian Church in Guinea-Bissau is a mission of the Presbyterian Church of Brazil. It was started as a medical mission in Guinea-Bissau. Today the church has three national pastors, and a training center, the Aboundadt Life Center and the Presbyterian Church in Gabú, this is a church and also in the church is a seminary, the building was begun to construct in the Spring 2013. There are two more congregations around Gabú and a preaching station in Sintabaco around 110 km from Gabú. The worship attendance is about 700.

== Congregations ==
- one congregation in Gabú
- one in Pega Teco about 10 km from Gabú
- one in Serracao 25 km from Gabú
- one in Pirada about 50 km from Gabú
- a preaching point in Sitcha Boco
- a congregation in Djaal
- a congregation in Missira

The church has a nutrition center in Gabú and three schools. Total attendance is growing – there are about 150 baptised members and 50 people are preparing the process of baptism or profession of faith. The church attendance is about 1,000. There are two evangelists and 20 Sunday school teachers.

The church in Gabú celebrated its 15 years of existence in the end of 2012.
