= Bible Christian Faith Church =

- Classification: Protestant
- Theology: Fundamental Reformed
- Governance: Presbyterian
- Region: Kenya
- Origin: 1980; Kenya
- Congregations: 18
- Members: unknown

The Bible Christian Faith Church is a fundamental Reformed and Presbyterian denomination in Kenya, Africa.

The Bible Christian Faith Church was formed in 1980 when 15 congregations separated from the Africa Inland Church, a church in Eastern Africa related to Africa Inland Mission. The problem was the Biblical separation and the politics included the issues of the spiritual life and power of the church. It was registered by the government in 1996. Ten congregations left to join another denomination. The Bible Christian Faith Church had 600 members and 6 congregations with 7 house fellowships in 2004. The denomination has a presbyterian-synodal government, and recognises the Apostles Creed and the Westminster Confession of Faith.

The Bible Christian Church now has eighteen churches and a Christian Academy in Kenya.
