= Christian Reformed Church of Campo Belo =

Reformed Protestant Church in São Paulo, Brazil

Coordinates: 23.6242°S 46.6747°W

The Christian Reformed Church of Campo Belo, formerly known as Swiss Evangelical Church of São Paulo, is a Reformed Protestant church in São Paulo. It was organized in 1958 to serve the Swiss community. The current pastor is Claudio Marra.

It is a member of the World Communion of Reformed Churches.
