= Taiwanese Presbyterian Church in Asuncion =

Church in Paraguay

The Taiwanese Presbyterian Church in Asuncion came into existence in 1978, when Rev. Chou Shen Chong was able to collect a number of Taiwanese Presbyterians in Ascuncion. The church was established in 1980. The work extends in the Brazilian border. The church subscribes the Apostles Creed, Nicene Creed, Heidelberg Catechism and Westminster Confession.
