= Reformed Church in Tunisia =

Church in Tunisia

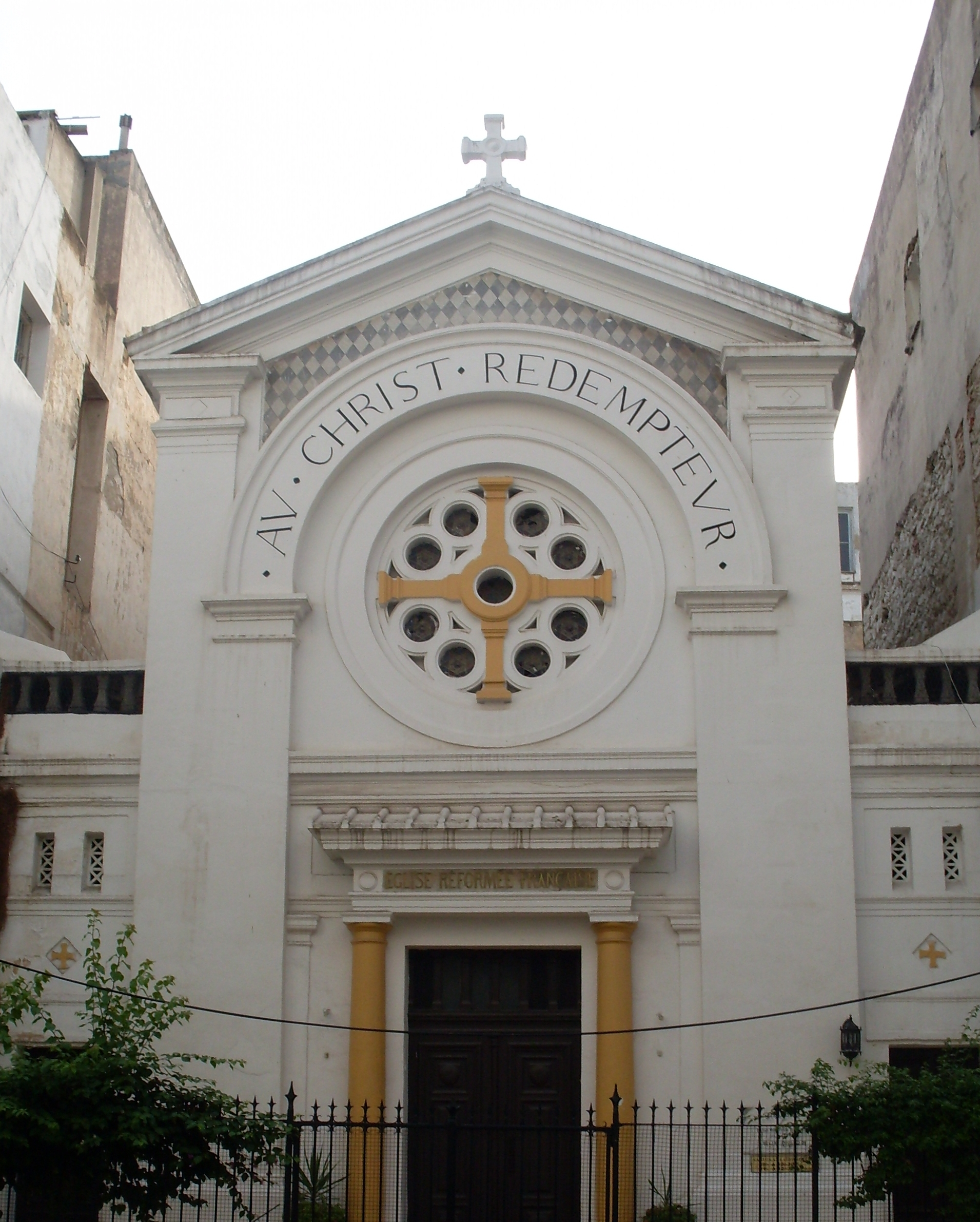
French Reformed Church, 36, rue Charles de Gaulle.

The Reformed Church in Tunisia (French: Église Réformée de Tunisie) is a single Reformed church in Tunis. Originally a French speaking congregation, now 15 - 20 nations are represented. It adheres to the Apostles Creed and the Heidelberg Catechism. It is a member, through the United Protestant Church of France, of the World Communion of Reformed Churches The church building underwent a large renovation in 2011. The attendance is 40–50.

The Reformed Church in Tunisia was born on November 11, 1882, with the worship attendance of 24 people in the pastor G.D. Durmayers home in Tunis. Seven years later in 1889 the present sanctuary was dedicated.
