= Evangelical Church of Chad =

United Protestant denomination in Chad

- Abbreviation: EET
- Classification: Evangelical
- Scripture: Bible
- Region: Chad
- Origin: 1962; Chad
- Merger of: United Mission of Sudan, WEC International and French Mennonite missions
- Members: 200,000 (2004)

The Evangelical Church of Chad (French: Église Évangélique au Tchad, acronym: EET) is an Evangelical denomination in Chad.

Since the late 1990s, it has been the largest Protestant denomination in the country.

== History ==
In 1926, a Canadian missionary couple, Florence and Victor Veary, of the Sudan United Mission (SUM), traveled to Chad. Initially, churches were established in the Logone province in the southwest. After that, the Bébalem station was established. Years later, they settled in N'Djamena (then Fort Lamy). The main focus of the mission was the evangelization of Muslims.

It was in 1952 that the French branch of the SUM was created under the name of the Franco-Swiss Protestant Mission of Chad (FSPMC).

In 1960, Chad became independent and the SUM was officially recognized by the Chadian government. The different branches of the SUM shared the various geographical sectors of the country, as well as the various activities. Thus, since then, the various Missions have continued their work in this country.

On the eve of the declaration of independence, Victor Veary, the first SUM missionary in Chad, encouraged the church to become independent, which it did.

The WEC International and the French Mennonite churches had also established missions in the country. Thus, in 1962, these churches decided to merge with the SUM.

The resulting church became known as the Evangelical Church of Chad (French: Église Évangélique au Tchad, acronym: EET).

In 2004, it was estimated that the church had 200,000 members.

In 2024, the denomination held its 51st general assembly. At the time, the president of the denomination's general office was Dr. Tao Vaileck Elysée.
