= Evangelical Presbyterian Church in Uganda =

The Evangelical Presbyterian Church in Uganda was founded in 1986, and was registered by the government in Uganda in 1987. It is connected with the Brainard Presbyterian Church in Tennessee. The church grew quickly, but a few years later it suffered a split and church membership reduced about 30 communicants. The church consist of 4 congregations in Kampala, Mubende District and Buwaya and Kakubo. It has Presbyterian government and affirms the Apostles Creed, Nicene Creed and the Westminster Confession. Official languages are English and Luganda.
