= United Presbyterian Church in Korea =

The United Presbyterian Church in Korea was founded in 1972, by Kim Se-Yul, Kang Heung-Mo and Yong-An. They created the Christian United Church in Korea. At the 13th General Assembly, the name was changed to the United Presbyterian Church. Since 1987, the church was also called the Presbyterian Church in Korea (YunHapChuk). It affirms the Apostles Creed and the Westminster Confession. The denomination has 8,000 members and almost 100 congregations.
