= Christian Presbyterian Church of Chile =

The Christian Presbyterian Church of Chile was founded by Korean missionaries among Spanish-speaking people in Chile.

The official founding date is 1994. It has approximately 600-700 members and 12 congregations. No women ordination is available. The Christian Presbyterian Church adheres to the Apostles Creed, Nicene Creed, Heidelberg Catechism and the Westminster Confession of Faith.
