= Presbyterian Church of Panama =

- Classification: Protestant
- Orientation: Reformed
- Theology: Calvinist
- Governance: Presbyterian
- Region: Panama
- Origin: 2011
- Branched from: Presbyterian Church of Brazil
- Congregations: 1 (2024)
- Members: 43 (2024)

The Presbyterian of Panama Church (Spanish: Iglesia Presbiteriana de Panamá, IPP) is a Protestant Reformed denomination, founded in Panama in 2011, by the missionary Gilberto Botelho, sent by the Presbyterian Agency for Transcultural Missions of the Presbyterian Church of Brazil. Based on its growth, the denomination was recognized by the government of Panama in 2022.

== History ==
In 1698, some 1,200 Scots settled in the Darién Gap, in Panama (then within the Viceroyalty of Peru), with the aim of establishing a new British colony that it was to be called New Caledonia. Among the settlers were members of the Church of Scotland (a Presbyterian denomination), who sent ministers to minister to members of the colony. This was the first Presbyterian presence in the territory that would later become in the Panama. However, the colony ceased to exist in 1700, leading to the departure of all Scottish Presbyterians from the region.

In 1916, the Congress of Panama was held, an ecumenical event that established that Latin America was already a Christian region (Roman Catholic) and should not be the object of Protestant missions. As a result, many Presbyterian denominations did not send missions to Panama until the 21st century.

In 2011, the Presbyterian Agency for Cross-Cultural Missions of the Presbyterian Church of Brazil sent missionary Gilberto Botelho, along with his wife Cristiane and their children, to Panama City, to initiate the planting of a Presbyterian church. Church growth, others missionaries were sent to the country, including Rev. Raimundo Monteiro Montenegro Neto, Rev. Paulo César Duarte de Oliveira, Joaquim Ivanil Rodrigues dos Santos, and Rev. Luiz Otávio N. Gomes, among others.

In 2022, the denomination was formally organized and recognized by the government of Panama.

On December 15, 2024, the first 3 Panamanian elders were ordained. In this year the first Presbyterian church in the country was formed by 43 members.

== Doctrine ==
As a result of the mission of the Presbyterian Church of Brazil, the Presbyterian Church of Panama is also a conservative and confessional church. The church does not support women's ordination, and only male members may serve as ministers, elders, or deacons. The Church subscribes to the Westminster Confession of Faith, the Westminster Larger Catechism, the Westminster Shorter Catechism, and the Apostles' Creed.
