= Indonesian Christian Church in the Netherlands =

The Indonesian Christian Church in the Netherlands is a theologically Reformed church that was founded in 1985 as an Indonesian-Chinese ethnic minority church. It had 800 members and 8 congregations and 15 house fellowships. Official languages are Dutch and Indonesian.
