= Mehrete Yesus Evangelical Presbyterian Church =

Presbyterian Church in Asmara, Eritrea

The Mehrete Yesus Evangelical Presbyterian Church is a Presbyterian church in the town of Asmara, Eritrea in 1995. Mahrete yesus means Compassion of Jesus. The church endured much turmoil. A Seminary was also founded.

Following the closure of all evangelical and Pentecostal churches in Eritrea the Mehrete Yesus was allowed to function as a church fulfilling the registration formalities demanded by the government. The pastor of the church, Zakarias Abraham, became the head of the Ethiopia Evangelical Alliance, because the former president was arrested by the government.

Government Persecution resulted the 80 members congregation and pastor to be arrested in 2007. The OPC missionaries were expelled from the country.

In 2011 the OPC missionaries returned the goal is to establish indigenous churches.
