= Evangelical Indigenous Mission in Madagascar =

The Evangelical Indigenous Mission in Madagascar (Misiona Evanjelika Teratany eto Madagasikara) is an Evangelical and Reformed denomination in Madagascar. The founder of the church was Pastor Rakatobe Adriamaro who was associated with the Paris Evangelical Missionary Society. The founding date is in 1955. In 2004 it had 105,000 members and 450 parishes served by 210 ordained clergy. There are 28 regional Synods and a General Assembly.
