= Evangelical Church of Peru =

The Evangelical Church of Peru is a Reformed denomination in Peru that adheres to the Westminster Confession. The first congregation was founded in 1894 in Lima. In 1919 the Synod of 9 communities adopted the name Evangelical Church of Peru. It was constituted in 1946. Since the 1950s the church grew rapidly. The majority of congregations are in the Altiplano. It had 20,000 members and almost 2,000 parishes. The church government is presbyterian-synodal with Presbyteries, Synods and the General Assembly. The Apostles Creed and the Westminster Confession of Faith was accepted since the founding of the denomination.
