= Presbyterian Church of the Reformation of Colombia =

Protestant reformed church in Colombia

- Classification: Protestant
- Orientation: Reformed Faith
- Theology: Calvinist
- Governance: Presbyterian
- Region: Colombia
- Origin: 1996
- Branched from: Orthodox Presbyterian Church
- Congregations: 9 (2020)
- Members: 250 (2020)
- Official website: www.opccolombia.org

The Presbyterian Church of the Reformation of Colombia (PCRC) - in Spanish Iglesia Presbiteriana de La Reforma de Colombia - is a Protestant reformed denomination, founded in Colombia in 1996 by Colombian believers who adhered to the Reformed Faith. As of 2005, the group is supported by missionaries from the Orthodox Presbyterian Church.

== History ==
In 1996, a group of Colombian believers adhered to the Presbyterian doctrine. Instead of merging the existing Presbyterian denominations, they preferred to found a new denomination which was named Presbyterian Church of the Reformation of Colombia (PCRC). In 2005, the group contacted the Orthodox Presbyterian Church. The US denomination sent missionaries to the country and went on to help the new Colombian denomination.

As of 2020, the denomination comprised a total of 250 members, in 9 churches and missionary congregations, spread across Sincelejo, Sapuyes, Pasto, Barranquilla, Bogotá and Tuquerres.

== Doctrine ==
The denomination subscribes to the Westminster Confession of Faith, Westminster Larger Catechism and Westminster Shorter Catechism.

== Inter-Church Relations ==
Since 2015, the denomination has had a "corresponding relationship" with Orthodox Presbyterian Church, a relationship established between denominations before full communion.
