= Evangelical Church in Iraq =

Christian denomination in Iraq

Evangelical Church has a history in Iraq that goes back to 1850. This church focus on education and established several schools in main cities in Iraq including Baghdad, Mosul, Basra and Kirkuk. After 2003, this church established more presence in Iraqi Kurdistan. The presence and influence of these churches and schools varies depending on the political system in Iraq. Members of this church come from Iraqi Presbyterian church and the historic Iraqi Syrian Catholic denomination.

== History ==
In 1850 Presbyterians and Congregationalists opened a mission in Mosul, Iraq. The Arabian mission of the Reformed Church in America started in 1889 in Basra; during the 1920s the Evangelical and Reformed Church and the United Presbyterian Church supported this effort. This united mission was merged with the Southern Presbyterian Church in 1957. Its main focus was education; there was little success in church planting. There were four Reformed-Presbyterian congregations in Baghdad, Kirkuk, Basra and Mosul, served by Egyptian pastors. In 1969 all missionaries were expelled from Iraq and their schools were closed. The exact number of churches and adherents is unknown.

In 2001 the Evangelical Church of Iraq had five congregations and opened a Christian school. These congregations are:

- National Evangelical Protestant Church in Kirkuk
- Assyrian Evangelical Presbyterian Church in Baghdad
- Arab Evangelical Presbyterian Church in Baghdad
- National Evangelical Protestant Church in Mosul
- National Presbyterian Church in Basra

These churches recently formed the Assembly of Presbyterian Churches of Iraq. It was formally recognised by the Iraqi government. The Presbyterian Church (USA) helps to form relationships with the Evangelical Presbyterian Church of Egypt, the Reformed Church in Kuwait, National Evangelical Synod of Syria and Lebanon.

Evangelical churches have experienced a rapid growth and revival. Since the fall of the Saddam Hussein regime, 15 evangelical congregations have been started.

Officially, two evangelical churches, both Presbyterian, operated during the Baath regime. But now, there are Baptists, Methodists, Christian Alliance denominations as well.

Most of the new evangelical members come from the Presbyterian church and from the historic Syrian Catholic denominations.
