= Evangelical Free Church in Uganda =

The Evangelical Free Church in Uganda is a Christian denomination in Uganda. It was founded in 1986 by Pastor Vicky Atwooki-Wamala in the Presbyterian Church in Uganda. The church grew in Mulago Valley and beyond. The church is Reformed, and Presbyterian, it accepts the Westminster Confession of Faith and the Westminster Larger Catechism. The headquarters of the denomination is in Kampala, Uganda. It had 20,000 members in 5 parishes and 10 house fellowships.

In the early 2010s it has hundreds of congregations.
