= Gereja Kristen Kalam Kudus =

The Gereja Kristen Kalam Kudus (Chinese: 基督教會聖道堂) was a mission of the Evangelize China Fellowship in Indonesia. The founder evangelist was Ji Zhiwen. It has 28 congregations and more than 5,000 members.
