= Confessional Reformed Church of Benin =

The Confessional Reformed Church of Benin (Eglise Reformée Confessante au Benin in French) was started by the radio broadcasting mission of the Christian Reformed Church in North America, this was the "Back to God Hour" radio ministry, the leader was Rev. Kayayan. The French-speaking countries like Benin and Congo this effort took root. In 1986 the congregation that formed in this period united to create the Confessional Reformed Churches, or ERCB. It has two congregations one in Cotonou, the largest city in Benin, and one in Mono/Couffo in south west Benin, and has approximately 400 members. It has no ministers, the churches affirms the Heidelberg Catechism and the La Rochelle Confession of Faith.

Later more than 13 community groups were formed around Cotonou in rural areas. Since 2011 the church had a graduate pastor.

From 1995, 30 congregations of the Reformed Churches in the Netherlands (Liberated) support this denomination to build the church and to evangelise.

As of 2014, there are 14 congregations and the church is still growing.
