= Independent Fundamental Presbyterian Church =

The Independent Fundamental Presbyterian Church or Iglesia Presbiteriana Independente Fundamentalista was founded in Guatemala in 1967. The followers were people with different theological background. Its goal is to become more Reformed and Presbyterian, and affirms the Westminster Confession, the Westminster Larger Catechism and Westminster Shorter Catechism. It has one congregation and about 100 members. The church was supported by the Independent Board of Foreign Missions.
