= Reformed Presbyterian Church in Ethiopia =

The Reformed Presbyterian Church in Ethiopia is a Calvinist denomination founded by Irish and American missionaries.

== Reformed Presbyterian Church of Ireland mission ==
The Reformed Presbyterian Church of Ireland had a Christian mission in the Tigray region from 1963-1975. The work focused on evangelism with practical work in education, medicine and agriculture. After the Derg came into power in 1974, the RPCI missionaries left, but kept in touch with the Ethiopian Christians they had met, sending humanitarian aid to Tigray during the 1983-1985 famine. Members of the RPCI returned to Tigray in 2015 and met with some of the Christians who had been connected to the mission.

== Orthodox Presbyterian Church mission ==
The Ethiopian Reformed Presbyterian Church (EPRC) was founded by missionaries of the Orthodox Presbyterian Church (OPC) in the United States.

In the late 1990s, the OPC sent a missionary to work in Ethiopia. In 1998, the first ERPC congregation was established in Addis Ababa. By 2017, the ERPC had 10 congregations with a seminary and a theological college.

In 2020, the OPC continued to support the ERPC with funding for ministering to young children in poverty, to individuals affected by HIV, and others in the church.

=== Grace Reformed Church ===
The Ethiopian Grace Reformed Church in Addis Ababa was established in 1998 as part of the ERPC. At the beginning there were seven believers, most of whom were members of the traditional Ethiopian Orthodox Churches. By 2008, it had four ordained pastors and several church planting works.
