= Christ Church in Warwick =

Church, member of the Church of Scotland

Coordinates: 32°16′20″N 64°47′59″W

The Christ Church in Warwick is a member of the Church of Scotland, established in 1719 as the first Presbyterian congregation in Bermuda. It is the oldest Presbyterian church outside the archipelago of the British Isles. It was served by Presbyterian ministers from the United States and Canada, until 1845, when it was affiliated with the Free Church of Scotland. In 1844 the congregation adopted the Christ's Church name, later shortened to Christ Church (inevitably causing some confusion with the Church of England Parish church for Devonshire Parish, which has the same name, and hence the two are often referred to as Christ Church Warwick and Christ Church Devonshire). A new church building was opened in 1845. Later the congregation become part of the United Free Church of Scotland and in 1929 the Church of Scotland, in 2001 it became a full member of the Scottish denomination, and in 2008 was a member of the Presbytery of Europe. It has about 600 members, and affirms the Apostles Creed and the Westminster Confession.

The church building is located on Middle Road in Warwick. Current rector is Reverend Amber Carswell.

== See also ==
- Church of Scotland
- Presbytery of Europe
