= Protestant Church in East Timor =

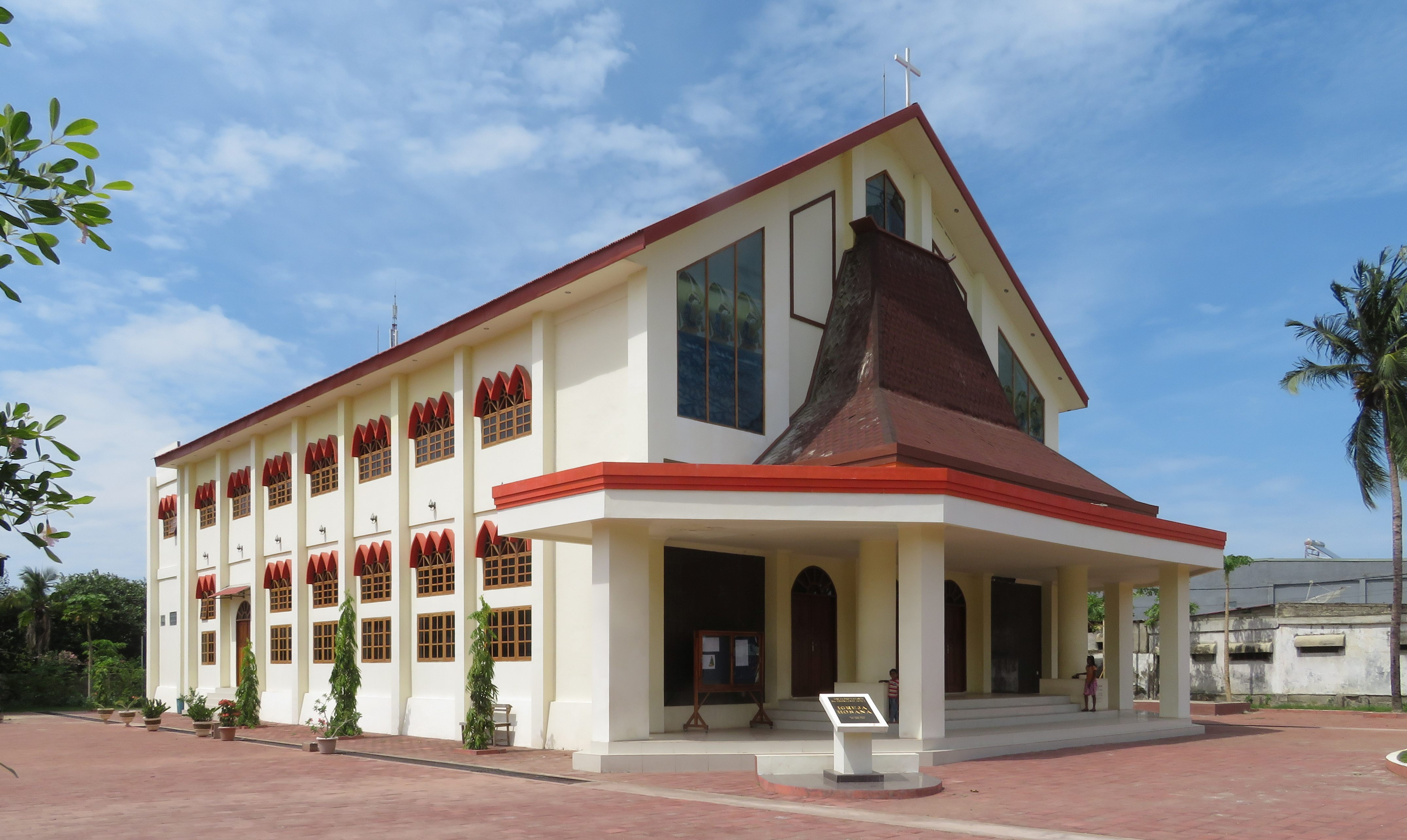
Protestant church "Igreja Hosana", Motael, Dili, East Timor

The Protestant Church in East Timor (IPTL) (Igreja Protestante iha Timor Lorosa'e), former Christian Church of East Timor (GKTT) (Gerja Kristen Timor Timur) is a Reformed Protestant denomination in Timor-Leste (formerly known as East Timor).

During Portuguese colonial rule in East Timor, which lasted until the country was annexed by Indonesia in 1975, Protestantism was suppressed. The Protestant Christian Church in East Timor came into being in 1979 and a synod was established in 1988. Membership grew to 34,625 in 1996. In 1998 it joined the World Communion of Reformed Churches and the World Council of Churches; it is also part of the Christian Conference of Asia.

The denomination publishes a monthly magazine, Tatoli, which means "message". It has a presbyterian style of church government.

The church maintains a relationship with the American United Church of Christ.

== See also ==
- Religion in Timor-Leste
