= Evangelical Presbyterian Church in Bolivia =

The Evangelical Presbyterian Church in Bolivia or the Iglesia Evangélica Presbiteriana en Bolivia was founded by Korean missionaries in 1983, especially Chong-Moo Park who organised congregations in La Paz and El Alto. He invited other Korean missionaries. Other churches were established. The church's counterpart is the Presbyterian Church in Korea (TongHap). It had 1,500 members and 12 congregations in 2004. The denomination subscribes the Westminster Confession of Faith and the Apostles Creed. This church is a member of the World Communion of Reformed Churches.
