= Protestant Church of Kanaky New Caledonia =

- Église protestante de Kanaky Nouvelle-Calédonie
- Abbreviation: EPKNC
- Theology: Reformed
- Origin: 1958
- Members: 30,000
- Official website: epknc.nc

The Protestant Church of Kanaky New Caledonia (French: Église protestante de Kanaky Nouvelle-Calédonie, EPKNC), known until 2013 as the Evangelical Church in New Caledonia and the Loyalty Islands (French: Église évangélique en Nouvelle-Calédonie et aux îles Loyauté, EENCIL), was formed in 1958, the denomination has announced its 50th anniversary in 2008. The London Missionary Society started missions work in the 18th century. At the turn of the 19th century the London Missionary Society gave way to the Paris Evangelical Missionary Society. The church currently has 90 parishes and 100 house fellowships with 30,000 members. The church is a member of the World Communion of Reformed Churches and has relationships with the Maói Protestant Church, Presbyterian Church of Aotearoa New Zealand and the Presbyterian Church in Vanuatu.

The church adheres to the Apostles Creed, Nicene Creed, Heidelberg Catechism, Second Helvetic Confession.

On 2013, the EENCIL changed its name to the Protestant Church of Kanaky New Caledonia.
