= Presbyterian Church of Venezuela =

Presbyterian denomination in Soutrh America

The Presbyterian Church of Venezuela (Iglesia Presbiteriana de Venezuela) is a Reformed denomination in Venezuela which began in 1897. Its confessions include the Apostles' Creed, Nicene Creed (381), Heidelberg Catechism (1563), Second Helvetic Confession (1562), Westminster Confession of Faith (1646/47) and Barmen Declaration (1934). In the 1970s, it suffered difficult times, the church faced Pentecostalism. In 1983, the oldest and largest church split, but maintained the name Presbyterian it was the El Redentor church. In 1991, a Synod was organised with 2 Presbyteries, the Western and Central Presbyteries. In 2004, the denomination had 21 congregation, 8 house fellowships and almost 1,000 members.

It is a member of the World Communion of Reformed Churches.
