= Presbyterian Church in Bolivia =

Christian denomination in Bolivia

The Presbyterian Church in Bolivia (or the Iglesia Presbiteriana de Bolivia the IPB in Spanish) is a confessional Presbyterian denomination in Bolivia, that was founded by Brazilian and American missionaries.

The church is the effort of Brazilian missionaries in Bolivia, especially Joao Carlos de Paola Mota sent by the Presbyterian Church of Brazil. The founding date of the church is in 1988. The main activities was in Cochabamba where the First Presbyterian Church in Cochabamba was founded, but church planting extended in other part of the country. Bible studies are reaching the Quechua people and Spanish speaking population. New church starts are in Cala Cala area of Cochobamba.

There is no women ordination, so only men can be ministers. The church runs a dental clinic and offers relief work. The Iglesia Presbiteriana de Bolivia subscribes the Westminster Confession of Faith, the Westminster Larger Catechism and Westminster Shorter Catechism and the Apostles Creed.

Congregations are in Cochabamba, La Paz, Santa Cruz, Bolivia, and Cala-Cala.
