= Presbyterian Church in Korea (BaekSeok) =

- Hangul: 대한예수교장로회(백석)
- Hanja: 大韓예수敎長老會(白石)
- Revised Romanization: Daehan yesugyo jangnohoe Baekseok
- McCune–Reischauer: Taehan yesugyo changnohoe Paeksŏk

Alternative name
- Hangul: 대한예수교장로회(합동정통)
- Hanja: 大韓예수敎長老會(合同正統)
- Revised Romanization: Daehan yesugyo jangnohoe Hapdong jeongtong
- McCune–Reischauer: Taehan yesugyo changnohoe Haptong chŏngt'ong

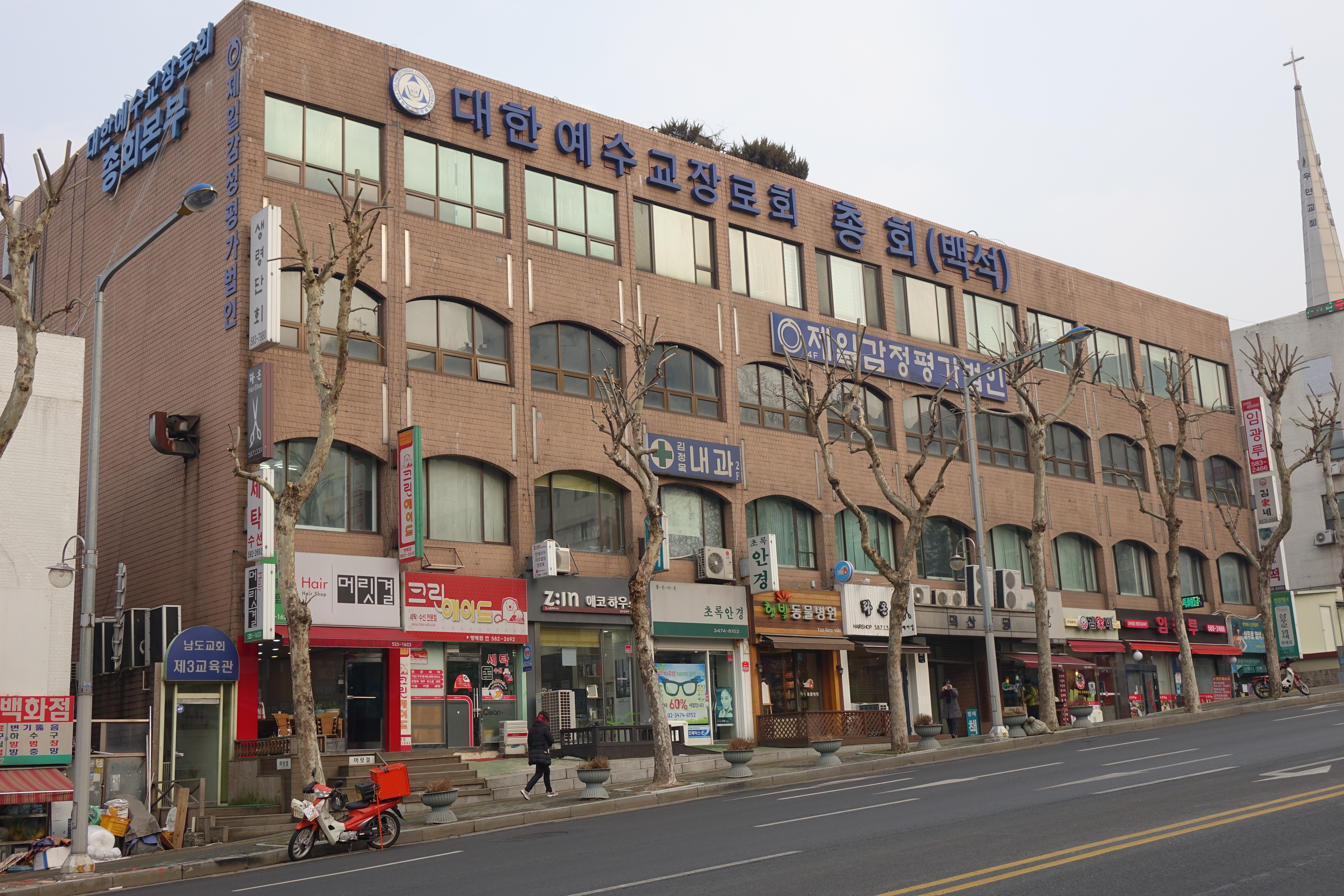
Presbyterian Church in Korea (BaekSeok)

The Presbyterian Church in Korea (Baekseok) other name is the Presbyterian Church in Korea (HapDongJeongTong) is strong Presbyterian Reformed denomination in South Korea, originated in the mainline and non-mainline division in 1979. In 1980 the non-mainline group founded the HapDongJinRi. One year later some members joined the YunHap section. The founding date of the denomination is in 1982, when these 2 group united and formed the current denomination. It's growing rapidly by evangelism and integrating other small groups. In 2004 it has 611,000 members and 1,700 congregations 39 presbyteries and a General Assembly. Total ordinated clergy is 2,905. There's no women ordination. The denomination adheres to the Apostles Creed and Westminster Confession of Faith.

Member denomination of the World Communion of Reformed Churches.

== See also ==
- Baekseok University
- Baekseok Arts University
- Baekseok Culture University
