= Reformed Churches in Argentina =

The Reformed Churches in Argentina is a Reformed Protestant denomination in Argentina. It is a member of the World Communion of Reformed Churches.

== History ==
The church traces its origins to a mission of the Reformed Churches in the Netherlands in 1897. They settled around Buenos Aires and Patagonia. Men and women participate in all ministries. The church has close links with the Waldensian Church – their synods have joint sessions and a joint General Assembly. The denomination has 13 congregations and 700 members.

The denomination adheres to the Apostles Creed, Nicene Creed, Canons of Dort, Heidelberg Catechism and the Athanasian Creed.

== Beliefs ==
=== Marriage ===
A resolution allows local churches to decide about blessings of same-sex marriage.
