= National Presbyterian Church in Chile =

Coordinates: 35.43298°S 71.67330°W

The church was a result of a split in the Presbyterian Church in Chile. The National Presbyterian Church in Chile was formed on July 2, 1944 in Santiago de Chile at the Holy Trinity Church. The attendance was about 500. At that time young Chilean leaders argued that the Presbyterian Church in Chile become an elitist church and not interested in growth and evangelism. In 1945 the church adopted the name of the National Evangelical Presbyterian Church. The church was supported by Dutch, Korean and Australian missionaries. In 1960 the church suffered a split, the National Fundamentalist Presbyterian Church was founded.

The denomination has 25 congregations and approximately 1,500 members served by 14 pastors. The church recognise the Westminster Confession of Faith, Heidelberg catechism, Apostles Creed and Nicene Creed.
