= Reformed Ecumenical Council =

Calvinist church organisation

The Reformed Ecumenical Council (REC) was an international organization of Calvinist churches. It had 39 member denominations from 25 countries in its membership, and those churches have about 12 million people together. It was founded August 14, 1946 in Grand Rapids, Michigan as the Reformed Ecumenical Synod. The Reformed Ecumenical Council was the second largest international Calvinist alliance and the more conservative of the two largest. In 1953, The Reformed Ecumenical Synod meeting in Edinburgh decided to advise its member churches not to join the World Council of Churches as currently constituted because it “permits essentially different interpretations of its doctrinal basis, and thus the nature of the Christian faith” and “represents itself as a Community of faith, but is actually not this” due to member churches holding “basically divergent positions.”

About two-thirds of REC member churches also belonged to the larger World Alliance of Reformed Churches (WARC). The seat of the Reformed Ecumenical Council was Grand Rapids, Michigan, United States.

After a two-day meeting ending on 1 February 2006, Douwe Visser, president of the REC and Clifton Kirkpatrick, president of the World Alliance of Reformed Churches, said in a joint letter to their constituencies, "We rejoice in the work of the Holy Spirit which we believe has led us to recommend that the time has come to bring together the work of the World Alliance of Reformed Churches and the Reformed Ecumenical Council into one body that will strengthen the unity and witness of Calvinist Christians." The new body would be called the World Communion of Reformed Churches.

== Australia ==
- Christian Reformed Churches of Australia

== Botswana ==
- Dutch Reformed Church in Botswana

== Dominican Republic ==
- Christian Reformed Church of the Dominican Republic

== France ==
- Evangelical Reformed Church of France (UNEPREF, formerly EREI)

== Greece ==
- Greek Evangelical Church

== India ==
- Presbyterian Church of India

== Indonesia ==
- Indonesian Christian Church of Central Java (GKI)
- Javanese Christian Churches (GKJ)
- Christian Church of Sumba (GKS)
- Southernpart Sumatra Christian Church (GKSBS)
- Church of Toraja Mamasa (GTM)
- Toraja Church (GT)

== Japan ==
- Reformed Church in Japan

== Kenya ==
- The Reformed Church of East Africa

== Korea ==
- The Presbyterian General Assembly (Reformed Church of Korea)

== Malawi ==
- Church of Central Africa Presbyterian - Nkhoma Synod

== Mexico ==
- Associate Reformed Presbyterian Church of Mexico

== Mozambique ==
- Reformed Church in Mozambique

== Myanmar ==
- Christian Reformed Church in Myanmar

== Netherlands ==
- Protestant Church in the Netherlands (PKN)

== Nigeria ==
- Christian Reformed Church of Nigeria
- Church of Christ in Nigeria
- Church of Christ in the Sudan Among the Tiv (NKST)
- Evangelical Reformed Church of Christ
- Presbyterian Church of Nigeria

== Philippines ==
- Christian Reformed Church in the Philippines

== South Africa ==
- Dutch Reformed Church (NGK)
- Dutch Reformed Church in Africa (DRCA)
- Reformed Church in Africa
- Nederduitsch Hervormde Kerk van Afrika (NHKA)

== Sri Lanka ==
- Dutch Reformed Church in Sri Lanka

== Swaziland ==
- Swaziland Reformed Church (SRC)

== Uganda ==
- Christian Reformed Church of East Africa
- Reformed Presbyterian Church in Uganda

== United States and Canada ==
- Christian Reformed Church in North America
