= Reformed Church in Japan =

Confessional Calvinist denomination in Japan

- Classification: Protestant
- Theology: Calvinist, Evangelical
- Polity: Presbyterian
- Leader: Takashi Yoshiba
- Associations: was a member of the Reformed Ecumenial Council
- Region: Japan
- Origin: 1946; Tokyo
- Separated from: United Church of Christ in Japan
- Congregations: 220
- Members: 8,000-9,000
- Ministers: 130

The Reformed Church in Japan is a confessional Calvinist denomination in Japan. It was formerly a member of the World Communion of Reformed Churches, but it chose to suspend its membership.

== Origin ==
The Reformed Church in Japan was formed in 1946 in Tokyo. Before Japan entered World War II, all Protestants were forced to unite in one church, the United Church of Christ in Japan. Some congregations with Calvinist background left this denomination to form the Japan Reformed Church. The Christian Reformed Church in North America sent missionaries to support the new denomination. At that time the church had nine pastors and three elders. The Calvinist World Mission has planted two presbyteries and almost 50 new congregations since entering Japan in 1951. CRCNA focuses their efforts on the metropolitan Tokyo area, one of the largest metropolitan areas of the world. The church has now 220 congregations and 8,000-9,000 members. The denomination is growing steadily. However, the congregations are small: the largest has about 210 members and the smallest has about 10 members. It affirms the Westminster Confession of Faith. Sister church relations with the Orthodox Presbyterian Church, the Presbyterian Church in Korea (Koshin), and the Reformed Church in the United States were established. The Orthodox Presbyterian Church(USA) works with a presbytery of the Reformed Church in Japan in church planting and evangelism. The OPC provides a professor for the Kobe Theological Seminary.

== Structure ==
The church has five presbyteries, namely Northeastern, Shikoku, Western, Central and Tobochu.

Northeast Presbytery includes churches in Kyoto, Osaka, Shiga, Hyogo, Nara, Wakayama, Fukui, Tottori, Shimane, Hiroshima, Yamaguchi, Fukuoka, Saga, Nagasaki, Kumamoto, Oita, Miyazaki, Kagoshima and Okinawa.

Shikoku Presbytery churches are in Tokushima, Kagawa, Ehime, Kochi and Okayama Prefecture.

Central Presbytery has congregations in Gifu, Shizuoka, Aichi, Mie, Ishikawa, Fukui and Toyama.

Tobuchu Presbytery has congregations in Saitama Prefecture, Kanagawa Prefecture, Greater Tokyo Area, Tochigi Prefecture, Gunma Prefecture and Yamanashi Prefecture.

== Theology ==
In 2004, the denomination had presbyterian-synodal church government with four districts and a Synod. As of November 2014, the denomination allows for the ordination of women. Formerly the church was a member of the Reformed Ecumenical Council.

- Westminster Confession of Faith
- Westminster Larger Catechism
- Westminster Shorter Catechism

== Theological education ==
- Reformed Theological Seminary
- Reformed Theological Institute

== Interchurch relations ==
- Cooperation in mission: Christian Reformed Church in North America, Orthodox Presbyterian Church, PC(USA), Reformed Church in Africa, South Africa, Dutch Reformed Church in South Africa, Koshin Presbyterian Church in Korea
- Friendly relations: Christian Reformed Church in the Philippines, Christian Reformed Church in Myanmar, Christian Reformed Churches in the Netherlands, Reformed Churches in South Africa, Netherlands Reformed Congregations (in the US)
- Fellowship: Presbyterian Church in Japan, Church of Christ in Japan, Reformed Presbyterian Church of North America-Japan Presbytery,

The Reformed Church in Japan was a full member of the Reformed Ecumenical Council. It is an observer in the International Conference of Reformed Churches and the World Communion of Reformed Churches.
