= Presbyterian Community in Congo =

- Classification: Protestant
- Orientation: Reformed
- Theology: Calvinist
- Polity: Presbyterian
- Associations: World Council of Churches, All Africa Conference of Churches, World Communion of Reformed Churches and Church of Christ in Congo
- Region: Democratic Republic of Congo
- Origin: 1891
- Branched from: Presbyterian Church in the United States of America
- Congregations: 926 (2006)
- Members: 2,500,000 (2006)
- Ministers: 672 (2006)

The Community Presbyterian in Congo - in French Communaute presbytérienne au Congo, usually abbreviated as CPC - is a Presbyterian denomination, part of the Church of Christ in Congo (ICC), a union of 64 Protestant denominations in the Democratic Republic of Congo.

Within the ICC, each denomination is given a number by which it is identified, the CPC is identified as the 31st community within the ICC.

In 2006, the CPC had approximately 2.5 million members, being the second largest Protestant denomination in the country and the largest reformed and presbyterian denomination.

== History ==
In 1891, the American Presbyterian Mission in the Congo (of the Presbyterian Church in the United States of America) began its work in Kasaï.

The name quickly spread throughout the country, especially in the region of Katanga.

The denomination became known for its social and educational work, as well as its mediation role in interethnic conflicts in southeastern Democratic Republic of the Congo.

The denomination administers the Presbyterian University of Congo.

In the 1970s, splinter groups formed the Presbyterian Community in Eastern Kasai, Presbyterian Community in Western Kasai and Reformed Community of Presbyterians.

By the end of the 1990s, the denomination had about 1,250,000 members, with 964 pastors, in 525 churches.

In 2006, the denomination reported to the World Council of Churches that it had 2,500,000 members in 926 congregations and 672 pastors.

== Doctrine ==
The community allows the ordination of women in all its offices. It also subscribes to the Apostles' Creed and the Westminster Confession of Faith.

== Inter-church relations ==
The CPC is a member of the World Council of Churches, of the All Africa Conference of Churches, of the World Communion of Reformed Churches and the Church of Christ in Congo.

In addition, it has close relationships with the Presbyterian Community of Kinshasa and the Protestant Community of Shaba.

== Doctrine ==
- Apostles Creed
- Westminster Confession of Faith
- Member of the World Communion of Reformed Churches
