= World Communion of Reformed Churches =

International Christian organization

- Type: Communion
- Classification: Protestant
- Orientation: Reformed
- Scripture: Bible
- Theology: Reformed theology
- Polity: Presbyterian
- President: Rev. Dr. Karen Georgia Thompson
- General Secretary: Rev. Phillip Peacock
- Headquarters: Hanover, Germany (2013–present); Geneva, Switzerland (2010–2013)
- Origin: 2010; 16 years ago
- Congregations: 172,271^{[a]} – 241,232^{[b]}
- Members: 100 million (2017)
- Official website: wcrc.eu
- a. Considering only full members. b. Including associate and affiliated members.

The World Communion of Reformed Churches (WCRC) is a Christian ecumenical body formed in June 2010 by the merger of the World Alliance of Reformed Churches (WARC) and the Reformed Ecumenical Council (REC).

The WCRC is the largest association of Reformed (Calvinist) churches in the world. It has 227 member denominations (224 full members and 3 associate or affiliate members) (Note: The World Communion of Reformed Churches list includes 170 active members and 60 inactive members. Among the active members, the organization lists the Evangelical Presbyterian Church (United States), Christian Reformed Church in North America and the United Free Church of Scotland, which have since left the organization, as well as Trinity Theological Seminary (an associate member that is a theological seminary and not a denomination), the China Christian Council (an associate member), and the Baptist Community of the Faithful of Africa (an affiliate member), which is why the WCRC list reports 230 members.) (Note: See World Communion of Reformed Churches#Active and Inactive Members.) in 108 countries.

Together, the full member denominations claim about 100 million members. Associated and affiliated denominations, the largest of which are the China Christian Council and Disciples Ecumenical Consultative Council, represent another 40 million people. In 2020, according to the World Christian Encyclopedia, published by Edinburgh University Press, excluding United and Uniting Churches, the communion reportedly had 60 million members.

The WCRC is the largest or second largest Protestant communion in the world. (Note: The Anglican Communion (AC) claims approximately 85 million members. The denominations that make up the World Communion of Reformed Churches (WCRC), with their full members, collectively claim over 100 million members. Therefore, according to self-reported figures, the WCRC is larger than the AC, considering only full members. However, some sources indicate that the total membership of the AC churches is actually 110 million. This would make the AC larger than the WCRC, if only the WCRC's full members are counted. Among the WCRC's associate members are the China Christian Council and the Disciples Ecumenical Consultative Council, which together represent over 40 million people. Therefore, if the WCRC's associate and affiliate members are counted, the WCRC has approximately 140 million members and surpasses any Protestant communion in the world. Therefore, the position of WCRC and AC as the third or fourth largest Christian communion depends on the number considered for the AC, as well as whether or not the associate and affiliate members of WCRC are included in the count.) For this reason, it is the third or fourth largest Christian communion in the world, after the Catholic Church, the Eastern Orthodox Church, and, possibly, the Anglican Communion.

Among the biggest denominations in the WCRC are the Ethiopian Evangelical Church Mekane Yesus, Church of Jesus Christ in Madagascar, Presbyterian Church of Nigeria, Church of South India, Presbyterian Church of East Africa, Presbyterian Church of Cameroon, United Church of Zambia, Protestant Church in Indonesia, Church of Central Africa Presbyterian, Presbyterian Church of Africa, National Presbyterian Church in Mexico, Presbyterian Community in Congo and Evangelical Church of Cameroon.

Its member denominations on the whole could be considered more liberal than the member denominations of the International Conference of Reformed Churches or the World Reformed Fellowship, which are also large ecumenical Calvinist organizations. The WCRC differs from other global Reformed communities in its liberal stance on homosexuality, (Note: In 2025, the General Council of the World Communion of Reformed Churches passed a resolution to "1. Reaffirm the diversity of God’s creation, including the life-giving gifts of human love and sexuality. 2. Reaffirm our witness to Christ’s gospel of love and inclusion, explicitly rejecting efforts to stigmatise, punish or exclude individuals based on their sexual orientation or gender identity. We specifically name exclusion from the church’s life and leadership. 3. Continue to engage in a process of study and consultation to enable members to deepen their understanding of the social and theological implications of sexual orientation and gender expression, discern how God is calling the Church to engage in prophetic witness on matters of sexuality and gender, and work towards building consensus for future public policy advocacy. Such consultations must include people of diverse sexualities and gender identities.") abortion, (Note: In 2025, the General Council of the World Communion of Reformed Churches passed a resolution to "1. Include reproductive rights within the Communion’s gender-justice work, giving attention to churches that require contextual resources and support. 2. Encourage theological reflection and pastoral care that affirms the sacredness of choice [to have an abortion], dignity, and community wellbeing. These appeals embody the Council’s commitment to discern, confess, witness, and be reformed through communities that center love, dignity, and the flourishing of life.") women's ordination, and ecumenism.

In 2025, the Public Witness Report, approved by the General Council of the WCRC, highlighted the organization's goals: combating the exclusion of LGBT people from the life and leadership of its member churches and encouraging pastoral practices that hold sacred the abortion rights of women. Decision 2 of the same Council listed combating homophobia, racism, Christian Zionism, caste systems, colonialism, and discrimination against women, as well as promoting climate justice, as objectives of the WCRC. Also in 2025, the WCRC elected the Rev. Dr. Karen Georgia Thompson, of the United Church of Christ, as President, the second woman to be elected to the position.

== History ==
=== Background ===
Reformed Faith emerged in Europe in the 16th century. From then on, it spread through migration and missions throughout the world. Since the 19th century, Reformed Christians began to organize structures that would allow for communion and the witness of unity among Reformed people around the world.

The WCRC traces its origins to 1875, with several unifying Reformed organizations emerging in London, England.

In 1875, the Alliance of the Reformed Churches throughout the World holding the Presbyterian System (ARCWPS) was organized in London. At the same time, in 1891, the International Congregational Council (ICC) was formed, which brought together churches of the Reformed Tradition that adopted the congregational system of government.

In 1946, a more conservative group of Reformed churches organized the Reformed Ecumenical Council (REC).

In 1970, the ARCWPS and ICC merged to form the World Alliance of Reformed Churches (WARC).

=== Formation ===
In the 21st century, the WARC and the REC have grown increasingly closer, with a growing number of churches participating in both organizations simultaneously.

After a two-day meeting ending on 1 February 2006, Douwe Visser, president of the Reformed Ecumenical Council, and Clifton Kirkpatrick, president of the World Alliance of Reformed Churches, said in a joint letter to their constituencies, "We rejoice in the work of the Holy Spirit which we believe has led us to recommend that the time has come to bring together the work of the World Alliance of Reformed Churches and the Reformed Ecumenical Council into one body that will strengthen the unity and witness of Calvinist Christians."

After first calling the potential body "World Reformed Communion", this was modified into "World Communion of Reformed Churches".

A Uniting General Council of the WCRC, bringing the organization into existence, took place from 18–26 June 2010 at Calvin College, located at Grand Rapids, Michigan, United States. The council focused on the "Unity of the Spirit in the Bond of Peace" mentioned in Ephesians as its main theme, setting a tone of true mutual understanding and acceptance amongst member churches and associates, laying aside differences and other issues as they embark on this shared journey with one another as each seeks to discern the will of God and continue their struggle for justice and peace in the world. The World Communion of Reformed Churches has not taken a position on the issue of homosexuality but includes denominations that affirm same-sex marriage.

== Work ==
The 2010 Uniting General Council stated that the WCRC should be "called to communion and committed to justice." Its two main program offices are thus focused on these aspects, with theological work included with communion. The Theology and Communion office serves as coordinator for official dialogues with other religious organizations, organizes a bi-annual Global Institute of Theology, and brings Calvinist theological scholars together for various discussions. The Justice office promotes economic, ecological and human rights, basing much of its work on the Accra Confession, a statement adopted at the 2004 General Council of the World Alliance of Reformed Churches and re-endorsed at the 2010 Uniting General Council.

The WCRC also has a General Secretariat which includes the general secretary's office, the communications office and other organizational responsibilities. Through the General Secretariat, the WCRC promotes dialogue between churches, advocates for causes on a global scale and supports the activities of its member churches.

The global headquarters of the WCRC are located in Hanover, Germany, with a North American non-profit subsidiary based in Grand Rapids, Michigan. Originally based in Geneva, Switzerland, which played host to John Calvin and earned a reputation as the "Protestant Rome", the group's Executive Committee announced on 8 November 2012, that they would relocate the headquarters to Hanover, Germany, by December 2013, due to overbearing financial strains caused by the high value of the Swiss franc.

== Organization positions ==
=== Ordination of women ===
In 2017, WCRC published the Declaration of Faith Concerning Women's Ordination, in which it supports the practice of women's ordination and encourages its 42 member denominations that do not ordain women to change their position. The National Presbyterian Church in Mexico and National Union of Independent Reformed Evangelical Churches of France protested against the declaration, while the Presbyterian Church of Chile abstained.

=== Abortion ===
The 2021 adopted "Gender Justice Policy" acknowledged the communion had "failed to respect a woman’s right to control her body and her right to choose" and also invites member churches to "commit to a process of study and discernment over the issues of sexuality, sexual pleasure, fertility, reproductive rights, and the right to choose". The gender justice policy applies to the WCRC and its executive staff and is commended to its member churches.

In 2025, the General Council of the World Communion of Reformed Churches passed a resolution to "1. Include reproductive rights within the Communion’s gender-justice work, giving attention to churches that require contextual resources and support. 2. Encourage theological reflection and pastoral care that affirms the sacredness of choice [to have an abortion], dignity, and community wellbeing. These appeals embody the Council’s commitment to discern, confess, witness, and be reformed through communities that center love, dignity, and the flourishing of life."

=== Same-sex marriage ===
In 2017, the WCRC noted it has no official position on human sexuality. However in the 2021 adopted "Gender Justice Policy" which the communion commends to its members churches it stated that: We are each made in the image of God and together, as Church, we are the Body of Christ, as such we are each created, gifted, and loved by God; we are each loved and valued for the beauty and totality of our being and the diversity of our bodies; our sexuality is a gift from God and a source of life; we are all needed to serve the church, without discrimination; and ....no one is excluded in the basis of their gender, sexuality, race, class, disability, poverty, or caste; and leadership must be exercised through the Spirit of God, with respect for all. Furthermore, "The Body of Christ, our Church, will begin to heal when: the voices of women and other marginalized persons begin to be heard in our Communion; the sexuality of each person is honoured, including the right to control one’s body".

The same policy "invites member churches to share custodianship and the responsibility for implementing the Gender Justice Policy and call upon them to act by:..."Commit to a process of study and discernment over the issues of sexuality, sexual pleasure, fertility, reproductive rights, and the right to choose;

In 2025, the General Council of the World Communion of Reformed Churches passed a resolution to "1. Reaffirm the diversity of God’s creation, including the life-giving gifts of human love and sexuality. 2. Reaffirm our witness to Christ’s gospel of love and inclusion, explicitly rejecting efforts to stigmatise, punish or exclude individuals based on their sexual orientation or gender identity. We specifically name exclusion from the church’s life and leadership. 3. Continue to engage in a process of study and consultation to enable members to deepen their understanding of the social and theological implications of sexual orientation and gender expression, discern how God is calling the Church to engage in prophetic witness on matters of sexuality and gender, and work towards building consensus for future public policy advocacy. Such consultations must include people of diverse sexualities and gender identities."

While the vast majority of its member churches only permit marriage between a man and a woman, and do not bless same-sex unions., a great many of its member denominations promote same-sex marriage or bless same-sex unions, such as the Remonstrant Church, Spanish Evangelical Church, United Church of Canada, Uniting Church in Australia, Uniting Church in Sweden, United Church of Christ, United Church of Christ in the Philippines, Evangelical Church of the River Plate, Evangelical Church of Czech Brethren, Protestant Church in the Netherlands, United Protestant Church in Belgium, United Protestant Church of France, Union of Protestant Churches of Alsace and Lorraine, Protestant Reformed Church of Luxembourg, Dutch Reformed Church in South Africa (NGK), Polish Reformed Church, Reformed Church in Austria, Reformed Church in America, Swiss Reformed Church, Uniting Reformed Church in Southern Africa, Reformed Alliance, Church of Lippe, Evangelical Reformed Church in Germany, United Reformed Church, Presbyterian Church in Canada, Presbyterian Church (USA), Church of Scotland, Presbyterian Church of Wales, United Presbyterian Church of Brazil, Uniting Presbyterian Church in Southern Africa, United Congregational Church of Southern Africa, Waldensian Evangelical Church, and Waldensian Evangelical Church of the River Plate.

=== Joint Declaration on the Doctrine of Justification ===
In 2017, WCRC became the 5th signatory of the Joint Declaration on the Doctrine of Justification, after the Pontifical Council for Promoting Christian Unity (of the Roman Catholic Church), Lutheran World Federation, World Methodist Council and Anglican Communion.

=== Christian Zionism, racism, caste, Palestinian people, Indigenous peoples, colonialism, and climate justice ===
In 2025, the General Council of the WCRC declared that Christian Zionism is "fundamentally evil, racist, and a travesty of the Gospel." At the same Council, solidarity was expressed with the Palestinian people and indigenous peoples. The Communion also committed to combating racism, colonialism, caste systems, discrimination against women, and promoting climate justice.

== Leadership and General Council ==
=== General Councils ===
Council year	City and country	Theme
2010	Grand Rapids, U.S.	Unity of the Spirit in the Bond of Peace
2017	Leipzig, Germany	Living God, Renew and Transform Us
2025	Chiang Mai, Thailand	Persevere in Your Witness

=== Presidents ===
WCRC presidents are ordinarily elected for a term of seven years at every General Council:

Year	Name	Church affiliation
2010–2017	Jerry Pillay	Uniting Presbyterian Church in Southern Africa
2017–2025	Najla Kassab	National Evangelical Synod of Syria and Lebanon
2025–present	Karen Georgia Thompson	United Church of Christ

=== General secretaries ===
WCRC general secretaries are elected for seven years at every General Council (held septennially). General Secretaries can serve up to a maximum of two terms:

Year	Name	Church affiliation
2010–2014	Setri Nyomi	Evangelical Presbyterian Church of Ghana
2014–2021	Chris Ferguson	United Church of Canada
2021–2023	"Collegial General Secretariat"	(see below)
2023–2026	Setri Nyomi	Evangelical Presbyterian Church of Ghana
2026–Present	Philip Peacock	Church of North India

Setri Nyomi's term was a continuation of his term as general secretary of the World Alliance of Reformed Churches. Upon the conclusion of Chris Ferguson's term as general secretary in August 2021, the WCRC Executive Committee appointed a "Collegial General Secretariat" originally composed of the three executive secretaries: Hanns Lessing (Secretary of Communion and Witness, Evangelical Church of Westphalia), Philip Vinod Peacock (Secretary of Justice and Witness, Church of North India), and Phil Tanis (Secretary of Communications and Operations, Reformed Church in America). They were joined in the Collegium by Muna Nassar (Secretary of Mission and Advocacy) in December 2022. In 2023, Setri Nyomi was installed as interim general secretary, to serve until the 2025 General Council.

== Member churches ==
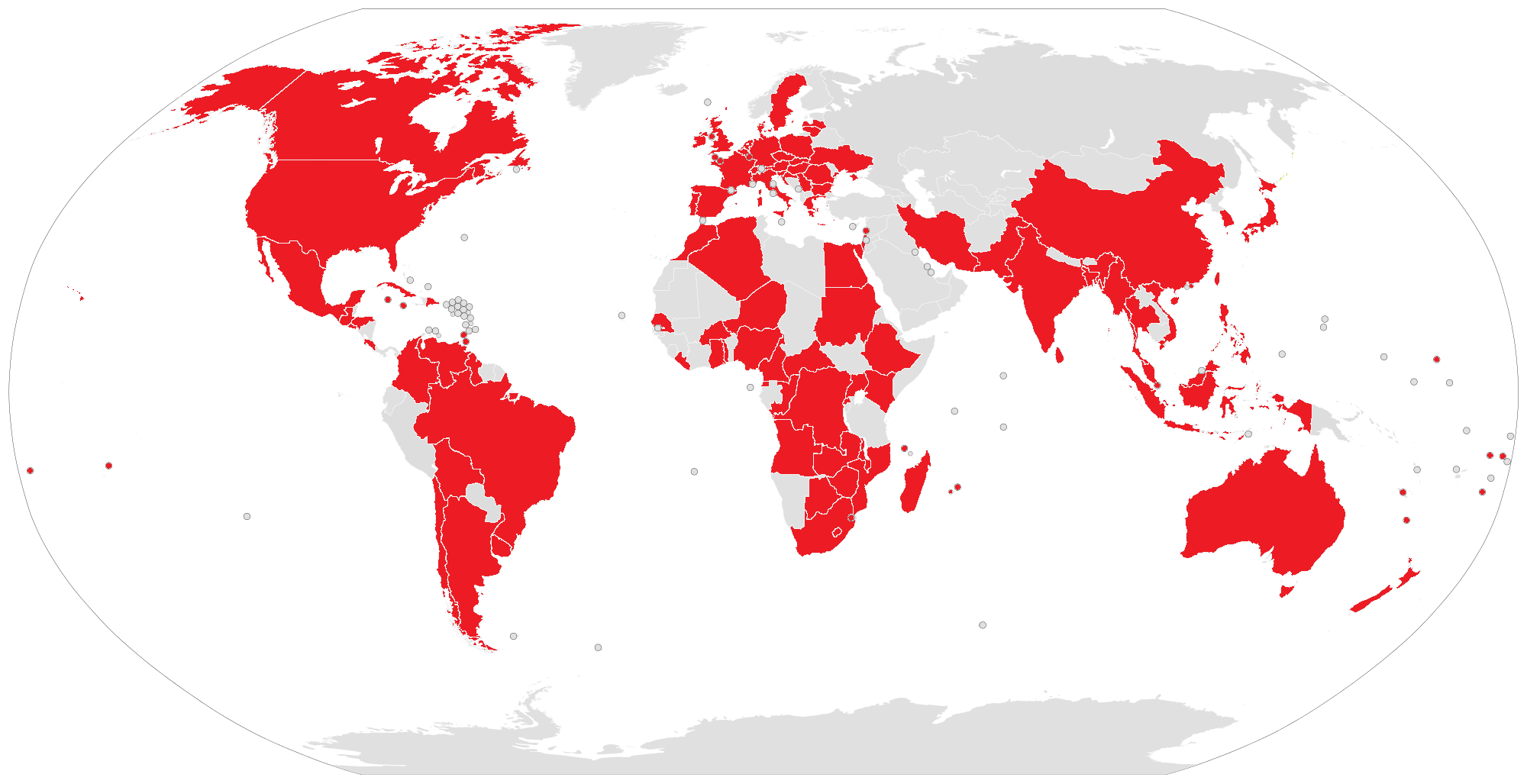
Red countries are home to at least one member of the World Communion of Reformed Churches.

As of June 2026, the World Communion of Reformed Churches has 224 denominations full members and 3 denominations associate or affiliate members:

Inactive members.
Active members who did not send delegates to the 2025 General Assembly.

Country	Denominational subfamily	Denomination	Number of congregations	Number of members	Year
Algeria	Continental reformed	Reformed Church of Algeria (Note: Inactive member.)	-	-	-
American Samoa	Congregational	Congregational Christian Church of American Samoa	113	20,000	2006
Angola	Congregational	Evangelical Congregational Church in Angola	2,900	1,000,000	2010
Angola	Continental reformed	Evangelical Reformed Church of Angola (Note: Active member who did not send delegates to the 2025 General Assembly.)	666	300,000	2022
Argentina	Congregational	Evangelical Congregational Church in Argentina	120	6,000	2021
Argentina	United Churches (Continental Reformed and Lutheran)	Evangelical Church of the River Plate	45	25,000	2023
Argentina	Continental reformed	Reformed Churches in Argentina	11	2,500	2017
Australia	Congregational	Congregational Federation of Australia and New Zealand	31	2,985	2004
Australia	United Churches (Presbyterians, Congregationalists and Methodists)	Uniting Church in Australia	2,500	243,000	2018
Austria	Continental reformed	Evangelical Church of the Helvetic Confession in Austria (Evangelische Kirche HB (Reformiert) in Österreich)	9	10,816	2024
Bangladesh	United Churches (Presbyterians and Anglicans)	Church of Bangladesh	115	22,600	2022
Bangladesh	Presbyterians	Evangelical Reformed Presbyterian Church in Bangladesh	-	-	-
Belgium	United Churches (Continental Reformed and Lutheran)	United Protestant Church in Belgium	103	3,401	2014
Bolivia	Presbyterians	Evangelical Presbyterian Church in Bolivia	12	1,500	2004
Botswana	Continental reformed	Dutch Reformed Church in Botswana	20	10,000	2016
Brazil	Presbyterians	Independent Presbyterian Church of Brazil	553	96,396	2019
Brazil	Presbyterians	United Presbyterian Church of Brazil	44	2,320	2020
Brazil	Continental reformed	Evangelical Reformed Churches in Brazil	13	3,242	2020
Brazil	Presbyterians	Arab Evangelical Church of São Paulo	1	80	2004
Bulgaria	Congregational	Union of Evangelical Congregational Churches in Bulgaria	34	5,000	2006
Burkina Faso	Continental reformed	Association of Evangelical Reformed Churches of Burkina Faso	22	40,000	2006
Cameroon	Presbyterians	African Protestant Church	32	10,000	2006
Cameroon	Continental reformed	Evangelical Church of Cameroon	700	2,500,000	2022
Cameroon	Presbyterians	Presbyterian Church in Cameroon	1,540	2,000,000	2017
Cameroon	Presbyterians	Presbyterian Church of Cameroon	1,364	4,000,000	2018
Canada	Presbyterians	Presbyterian Church in Canada	1,337	79,961	2019
Canada	United Churches (Presbyterians, Congregationalists and Methodists)	United Church of Canada	2,451	325,315	2023
Central African Republic	Continental reformed	Protestant Church of Christ the King	2	700	2004
Chile	Presbyterians	Presbyterian Church of Chile	40	2,807	2018
Chile	Presbyterians	Evangelical Presbyterian Church in Chile	12	1,000	2006
China (People's Republic of China)	United Churches (Presbyterians, Congregationalists, Baptists and Methodists)	Hong Kong Council of the Church of Christ in China	74	36,000	2016
Colombia	Presbyterians	Presbyterian Church of Colombia (Presbyterian Synod)	45	12,000	2006
Congo (Democratic Republic of Congo)	United Churches	Evangelical Community in the Congo	87	83,746	2006
Congo (Democratic Republic of Congo)	Presbyterians	Presbyterian Community in Congo	926	2,500,000	2006
Congo (Democratic Republic of Congo)	Presbyterians	Reformed Presbyterian Community in Africa (Presbyterian Community in Western Kasai)	496	28,000	2004
Congo (Democratic Republic of Congo)	Presbyterians	Presbyterian Community of Eastern Kasai	104	27,210	2004
Congo (Democratic Republic of Congo)	Presbyterians	Presbyterian Community of Kinshasa	186	67,436	2006
Congo (Democratic Republic of Congo)	Continental reformed	Protestant Community in Katanga (Protestant Community of Shaba)	28	18,000	2004
Congo (Democratic Republic of Congo)	Presbyterians	Reformed Community of Presbyterians	21	11,194	2006
Congo (Republic of Congo)	Continental reformed	Evangelical Church of Congo	118	225,000	2016
Costa Rica	Presbyterians	Costa Rican Presbyterian Evangelical Church	24	1,325	2013
Croatia	Continental reformed	Reformed Christian Calvinist Church in Croatia	21	3,378	2006
Cuba	Presbyterians	Reformed Presbyterian Church in Cuba	59	15,000	2006
Cuba	Moravians	Moravian Church in Cuba	8	600	2021
Czechia	United Churches (Continental Reformed and Lutheran	Evangelical Church of Czech Brethren	242	58,410	2022
Denmark	Continental reformed	Reformed Synod of Denmark	4	1,000	2004
Dominican Republic	Continental reformed	Christian Reformed Church of the Dominican Republic	-	15,000	2022
Dominican Republic	United Churches (Presbyterians and Methodists)	Dominican Evangelical Church	101	5,000	2022
Egypt	Presbyterians	Evangelical Church of Egypt (Synod of the Nile)	400	750,000	2024
El Salvador	Continental reformed	Reformed Calvinist Church of El Salvador	5	3,212	2004
Eswatini	Continental reformed	Swaziland Reformed Church	4	1,600	2016
Ethiopia	United Churches (Presbyterians and Lutherans)	Ethiopian Evangelical Church Mekane Yesus	16,000	15,000,000	2025
France	United Churches (Continental reformed and Lutheran)	Malagasy Protestant Church in France	39	10,000	2023
France	United Churches (Continental Reformed and Lutheran)	Union of Protestant Churches of Alsace and Lorraine: Protestant Reformed Church of Alsace and Lorraine	240	220,000	2023
France	United Churches (Continental Reformed and Lutheran)	United Protestant Church of France	1,000	250,000	2019
French Polynesia	Congregational	Maohi Protestant Church	104	135,500	2019
Germany	Continental reformed	Reformed Alliance: Church of Lippe (Note: member of the Reformed Alliance, which is already a member of the World Communion of Reformed Churches. Therefore, the number of churches and members of this denomination are not included in the total sum.); Evangelical Reformed Church in Germany; Evangelical Old-Reformed Church in Lower Saxony	320: 65; 143; 12	1,500,000: 135,462; 155,043; 6,275	2023: 2023; 2022; 2022
Ghana	Presbyterians	Evangelical Presbyterian Church, Ghana	750	600,000	2021
Ghana	Presbyterians	Presbyterian Church of Ghana	4,889	1,469,767	2024 (Note: The Presbyterian Church of Ghana announced in 2024 that it had 1,366,375 members in 2023. In 2025, it published that it had a net increase of 103,392 new members in 2024. Therefore, the number of members of the denomination in 2024 is 1,469,767 people.)
Greece	Presbyterians	Greek Evangelical Church	30	6,000	2016
Grenada	Presbyterians	Presbyterian Church in Grenada	3	876	2004
Guatemala	Presbyterians	National Evangelical Presbyterian Church of Guatemala	155	60,000	2023
Guyana	Congregational	Guyana Congregational Union	40	2,452	2006
Guyana	Presbyterians	Guyana Presbyterian Church	44	2,500	2006
Guyana	Presbyterians	Guyana Presbyterian Church	25	5,600	2006
Equatorial Guinea	Presbyterians	Reformed Presbyterian Church of Equatorial Guinea	29	8,230	2006
Honduras	Continental reformed	Christian Reformed Church of Honduras	75	5,000	2011
Hungary	Continental reformed	Reformed Church in Hungary	1,230	943,982	2022
India	United Churches (Presbyterians, Anglicans, Methodists and Disciples of Christ)	Church of North India	4,600	2,300,000	2025
India	United Churches (Presbyterians, Congregationalists, Continental Reformed, Anglicans and Methodists)	Church of South India	10,114	5,000,000	2020
India	Congregational	Congregational Church of India (Maraland)	23	5,500	2006
India	Congregational	Evangelical Church of Maraland	92	44,507	2020
India	Congregational	Evangelical Churches Association (India)	200	35,000	2017
India	Presbyterians	Presbyterian Church of India	4,054	1,605,423	2024
India	Presbyterians	Reformed Presbyterian Church, North East India	105	11,376	2021
Indonesia	Continental reformed	Central Sulawesi Christian Church	625	501,750	2022
Indonesia	Continental reformed	Christian Church in South Sulawesi	41	6,555	2004
Indonesia	Continental Reformed	Christian Church of South Sumatra	102	35,411	2025
Indonesia	Continental Reformed	Christian Churches of Java	346	230,000	2023
Indonesia	Continental Reformed	Christian Church of Sumba	712	500,000	2020
Indonesia	Continental reformed	Christian Evangelical Church in Sangihe-Talaud	430	158,925	2012
Indonesia	Continental reformed	Toraja Mamasa Church	580	140,000	2010
Indonesia	Continental reformed	East Java Christian Church	180	153,000	2004
Indonesia	Continental reformed	Evangelical Christian Church in Halmahera	411	300,000	2018
Indonesia	Continental reformed	Evangelical Church in Kalimantan	1,280	330,735	2015
Indonesia	Continental reformed	Evangelical Christian Church in West Papua	2,043	834,763	2024
Indonesia	Continental reformed	Evangelical Christian Church In Bolaang Mongondow	181	210,300	2012
Indonesia	Continental reformed	Indonesian Christian Church	231	263,688	2020
Indonesia	Continental reformed	Karo Batak Protestant Church	805	520,000	2025
Indonesia	Continental reformed	Pasundan Christian Church	45	30,000	2004
Indonesia	Continental reformed	Protestant Christian Church in Bali	72	13,520	2023
Indonesia	Continental reformed	Protestant Church in Southeast Sulawesi	64	30,000	2006
Indonesia	Continental reformed	Toraja Church	1,144	262,171	2022
Indonesia	Continental reformed	Protestant Church in Indonesia (Note: The Protestant Church in Indonesia consists of 12 regional churches, which together claim some 3,766,078 members in 4,373 churches and congregations. However, each regional church participates independently in ecumenical bodies. Thus, only 8 of its 12 constituent churches are members of the WCRC. The membership and places of worship figures of the 4 regional churches that are not members (Protestant Church in Indonesia in Papua, Talaud Christian Evangelical Church, Indonesian Protestant Church Baggai Kepulawan, and Indonesian Ecumenical Christian Church) are not included.): Evangelical Christian Church in Timor (Note: member of the Protestant Church in Indonesia, which is already a member of the World Communion of Reformed Churches. Therefore, the number of churches and members of this denomination are not included in the total sum); Evangelical Christian Church In Minahasa; Protestant Church in Western Indonesia; Protestant Church in the Moluccas; Indonesian Protestant Church in Donggala; Indonesian Protestant Church in Buol Toli-Toli; Christian Church in Luwuk Banggai; Indonesian Protestant Church in Gorontalo	3,467: 634; 1,060; 351; 761; 173; 251; 76; 168	3,399,976: 1,145,226; 830,107; 750,000; 575,405; 50,000; 23,374; 15,009; 10,302	2023: 2023; 2023; 2021; 2019; 2020; 2023; 2023; 2023
Iran	Presbyterians	Evangelical Presbyterian Church of Iran	14	9,000	2018
Ireland	Presbyterians	Presbyterian Church in Ireland	500	185,000	2025
Israel	Presbyterians	Baraka Bible Presbyterian Church	2	50	2004
Italy	Waldenses	Waldensian Evangelical Church	177	21,657	2017
Jamaica	United Churches (Presbyterians, Congregationalists and Disciples of Christ)	United Church in Jamaica and the Cayman Islands	194	14,000	2025
Japan	Presbyterians	Church of Christ in Japan	131	9,900	2024
Japan	Presbyterians	Korean Christian Church in Japan	100	7,160	2006
Kenya	Presbyterians	Presbyterian Church of East Africa	3,200	4,000,000	2010
Kenya	Continental reformed	Reformed Church of East Africa	600	50,000	2021
Kiribati	United Churches (Presbyterians, Congregationalists and Anglicans)	Kiribati Uniting Church	136	25,216	2020
Latvia	Continental reformed	Reformed Church in Latvia	3	40	2006
Lebanon	Presbyterians	Union of the Armenian Evangelical Churches in the Near East	25	9,500	2006
Lebanon	Presbyterians	National Evangelical Synod of Syria and Lebanon	36	8,000	2006
Lebanon	Presbyterians	National Evangelical Union of Lebanon	9	2,000	2006
Lesotho	Continental reformed	Lesotho Evangelical Church in Southern Africa	109	800,000	2020
Liberia	Presbyterians	Presbyterian Church in Liberia	15	3,000	2023
Luxembourg	Continental reformed	Protestant Reformed Church of Luxembourg	4	3,500	2006
Madagascar	Continental reformed	Church of Jesus Christ in Madagascar	7,200	6,000,000	2016
Malawi	Presbyterians	Church of Central Africa Presbyterian - Blantyre Synod; Church of Central Africa Presbyterian – Nkhoma Synod (Note: The Church of Central Africa Presbyterian has 5 synods. Each Synod participates in ecumenical organizations independently. The synods of Blantyre (Malawi), Nkhoma (Malawi), Zimbabwe and Harare (Zambia) are members of the World CommunION of Reformed Churches, while the synod of Livingstonia (Malawi) is the only non-participant.)	1,035: 800; 235	2,800,000: 1,800,000; 1,000,000	2024 (Note: Includes only synod membership numbers from Blantyre (Malawi) and Nkhoma (Malawi) synods.): 2016; 2024
Malaysia	Presbyterians	Presbyterian Church in Malaysia	100	7,000	2004
Marshall Islands	Congregational	Reformed Congregational Churches	9	4,000	2004
Marshall Islands	Congregational	United Church of Christ – Congregational in the Marshall Islands	32	37,130	2021
Mauritius	Presbyterians	Presbyterian Church of Mauritius	5	501	2011
Mexico	Presbyterians	National Presbyterian Church in Mexico	6,000	2,800,000	2010
Mexico	Presbyterians	Associate Reformed Presbyterian Church of Mexico	63	2,365	2004
Mexico	Presbyterians	Presbyterian Reformed Church of Mexico	102	26,000	2004
Mexico	Presbyterians	Mexican Communion of Reformed and Presbyterian Churches	-	-	-
Morocco	Continental reformed	Evangelical Church in Morocco	9	3,000	2016
Mozambique	Presbyterians	Evangelical Church of Christ in Mozambique	500	40,000	2004
Mozambique	Presbyterians	Presbyterian Church of Mozambique	350	200,000	2010
Mozambique	Continental reformed	Reformed Church in Mozambique	75	80,000	2019
Mozambique	Congregational	United Church of Christ in Mozambique	22	15,000	2011
Myanmar	Continental reformed	Christian Reformed Church in Myanmar	50	5,000	2004
Myanmar	Presbyterians	Independent Presbyterian Church of Myanmar	182	4,932	2004
Myanmar	United Churches (Congregational and Lutheran)	Mara Evangelical Church	87	21,879	2023
Myanmar	Presbyterians	Presbyterian Church of Myanmar	245	33,000	2001
Myanmar	Presbyterians	Reformed Presbyterian Church in Myanmar	35	2,500	2021
Myanmar	Presbyterians	Evangelical Presbyterian Church in Myanmar	33	5,000	2004
Netherlands	United Churches (Continental Reformed and Lutheran)	Protestant Church in the Netherlands	1,487	1,387,000	2025
Netherlands	Arminians	Remonstrant Brotherhood	44	5,050	2015
Netherlands	Congregational	Covenant of Free Evangelical Congregations in the Netherlands	40	7,000	2004
New Caledonia	Continental reformed	Protestant Church of Kanaky New Caledonia	90	70,000	2006
New Zealand	Presbyterians	Presbyterian Church of Aotearoa New Zealand	259	18,348	2023
Niger	Continental reformed	Evangelical Church of the Republic of Niger	-	12,000	2019
Nigeria	Continental reformed	Christian Reformed Church of Nigeria	180	500,000	2024
Nigeria	Continental reformed	Universal Reformed Christian Church (Church of Christ in the Sudan Among the Tiv)	2,000	1,000,000	2023
Nigeria	Continental reformed	Evangelical Reformed Church of Christ	267	1,500,000	2004
Nigeria	Presbyterians	Presbyterian Church of Nigeria	2,000	5,800,000	2019
Nigeria	Continental reformed	Reformed Church of Christ for Nations	132	100,000	2024
Nigeria	Continental reformed	United Church of Christ in Nigeria	81	66,000	2004
Niue	Congregational	Congregational Christian Church of Niue	16	1,190	2006
Pakistan	Presbyterians	Presbyterian Church of Pakistan	220	500,000	2025
Pakistan	United Churches (Presbyterians, Methodists, Lutherans and Anglicans)	Church of Pakistan	400	1,900,000	2020
Philippines	United Churches (Presbyterians, Baptists, Disciples of Christ and Methodists)	United Church of Christ in the Philippines	2,564	470,792	2020
Philippines	Continental reformed	Christian Reformed Church in the Philippines	98	8,232	2024
Philippines	United Churches (Presbyterians and Methodists)	United Evangelical Church of Christ	72	30,000	2004
Poland	Continental reformed	Polish Reformed Church	13	3,200	2020
Portugal	Presbyterians	Evangelical Presbyterian Church of Portugal	21	3,000	2006
Romania	Continental Reformed	Reformed Church in Romania	1,352	495,380	2021
Rwanda	Presbyterians	Presbyterian Church in Rwanda	3,573	1,624,823	2024
Samoa	Congregational	Congregational Christian Church of Samoa	325	70,000	2006
Senegal	Continental reformed	Protestant Church in Senegal	5	1,000	2015
Serbia	Continental reformed	Reformed Christian Church in Serbia and Montenegro	50	17,000	2004
Singapore	Presbyterians	Presbyterian Church in Singapore	37	21,000	2020
Slovakia	Continental reformed	Reformed Christian Church in Slovakia	304	85,271	2021
Slovenia	Continental reformed	Reformed Church in Slovenia	4	400	2004
Solomon Islands	United Churches (Presbyterians and Methodists)	United Church in the Solomon Islands	191	50,000	2006
South Africa	Continental reformed	Dutch Reformed Church in South Africa (NGK)	1,158	1,074,765	2013
South Africa	Continental reformed	Dutch Reformed Church in South Africa (NHK)	276	70,000	2017
South Africa	Continental reformed	Dutch Reformed Church in Africa	-	-	-
South Africa	Presbyterians	Evangelical Presbyterian Church in South Africa	42	48,000	2006
South Africa	Continental reformed	Maranatha Reformed Church of Christ	68	23,950	2004
South Africa	Continental reformed	Peoples Church of Africa	220	21,216	2004
South Africa	Presbyterians	Presbyterian Church of Africa	9,000	3,381,000	2006
South Africa	Continental reformed	Reformed Church in Africa (South Africa)	12	2,386	1996
South Africa	Continental reformed	Uniting Reformed Church in Southern Africa	783	900,000	2019
South Africa	Presbyterians	Uniting Presbyterian Church in Southern Africa	473	500,000	2006
South Africa	Congregational	United Congregational Church of Southern Africa	1,000	1,500,000	2024
South Korea	Presbyterians	Presbyterian Church in Korea (TongHap)	9,446	2,190,919	2024
South Korea	Presbyterians	Presbyterian Church in Korea (BaekSeok)	10,158	2,001,019	2025
South Korea	Presbyterians	Presbyterian Church in the Republic of Korea	1,596	188,159	2024
South Sudan	Continental reformed	Africa Inland Church Sudan	340	125,000	2006
Spain	United Churches (Presbyterians, Congregationalists, Waldensians, Methodists and Lutherans)	Spanish Evangelical Church	40	3,000	2014
Sri Lanka	Continental reformed	Dutch Reformed Church in Sri Lanka	41	3,000	2014
Sri Lanka	Presbyterians	Presbytery of Lanka	3	500	2004
Sweden	United Churches (Baptists, PT and Methodist)	Uniting Church in Sweden	640	58,569	2021
Switzerland	Continental reformed	Protestant Church of Switzerland	982	1,782,513	2024
Sudan	Presbyterians	Presbyterian Church in Sudan	500	1,000,000	2006
Taiwan	Presbyterians	Presbyterian Church in Taiwan	1,271	257,550	2020
Thailand	United Churches (Presbyterians, Lutherans and Baptists)	Church of Christ in Thailand	1,000	160,000	2016
Togo	Presbyterians	Evangelical Presbyterian Church of Togo	591	127,817	2016
Trinidad and Tobago	Presbyterians	Presbyterian Church of Trinidad and Tobago	108	40,000	2004
Tuvalu	Congregational	Tuvalu Christian Church	18	9,682	2012
Uganda	Continental reformed	Christian Reformed Church of East Africa	-	100,000	2019
Uganda	Presbyterians	Reformed Presbyterian Church in Uganda	12	5,000	2004
Uganda	Presbyterians	Reformed Presbyterian Church in Africa (Uganda)	8	619	2022
Ukraine	Continental reformed	Reformed Church in Sub-Carpathia/ Reformed Church in Transcarpathia	108	70,000	2015
United Kingdom	Presbyterians	Church of Scotland	992	245,000	2024
United Kingdom	Presbyterians	Presbyterian Church of Wales	471	12,938	2023
United Kingdom	Congregational	Union of Welsh Independents	390	20,000	2006
United Kingdom	United Churches (Presbyterians, Congregationalists and Disciples of Christ)	United Reformed Church	1,242	35,844	2022
United States of America	Arminians	Cumberland Presbyterian Church	841	57,616	2023
United States of America	Arminians	Cumberland Presbyterian Church in America	111	14,473	2020
United States of America	Presbyterians	ECO: A Covenant Order of Evangelical Presbyterians	400	127,000	2022
United States of America	Continental reformed`	Hungarian Reformed Church in America	27	6,080	2006
United States of America	Presbyterians	Korean Presbyterian Church Abroad	417	53,182	2023
United States of America	Presbyterians	Presbyterian Church (USA)	8,432	1,045,848	2024
United States of America	Continental reformed	Reformed Church in America	698	88,128	2024
United States of America	United Churches (Anabaptist, Congregationalist, Continental Reformed, Lutheran and Restorationist)	United Church of Christ	4,485	683,936	2023
Uruguay	Waldenses	Waldensian Evangelical Church of the River Plate	23	13,685	2004
Vanuatu	Presbyterians	Presbyterian Church of Vanuatu	400	65,000	2018
Venezuela	Presbyterians	Presbyterian Church of Venezuela	17	800	2018
Vietnam	Presbyterians	Presbyterian Church of Vietnam	-	17,000	2015
Zambia	Presbyterians	Church of Central Africa Presbyterian – Synod of Zambia	89	120,000	2024
Zambia	Continental reformed	Reformed Church in Zambia	200	1,000,000	2022
Zambia	United Churches (Presbyterians and Methodists)	United Church of Zambia	1,060	4,000,000	2024
Zimbabwe	Continental reformed	Reformed Church in Zimbabwe	123	100,000	2022
Zimbabwe	Presbyterians	Church of Central Africa Presbyterian – Harare Synod	28	8,574	2018
Global	Total	World Communion of Reformed Churches (full members only)	172,271	108,073,167	2004-2025
China (People's Republic of China)	United Churches	China Christian Council (associate member)	60,000	38,000,000	2018
Congo (Democratic Republic of Congo)	Baptists	Baptist Community of the Faithful in Africa (affiliate member)	469	48,724	2024
Global	Disciples of Christ	Disciples Ecumenical Consultative Council (associate member)	8,492	1,069,791	2022 (Note: excluding numbers from the United Congregational Church of Southern Africa, Church of North India, United Church in Jamaica and the Cayman Islands, and United Reformed Church, which are already members of the World Communion of Reformed Churches.)
Global	Total	World Communion of Reformed Churches (including associate and affiliate members)	241,232	147,191,682	2004-2025

=== Active and Inactive Members ===
Although the WCRC officially has 230 full, associate, and affiliate member denominations, delegates from only 117 denominations attended the 2025 General Assembly.

It was reported at the Assembly that only 51 of the member denominations regularly pay the dues required for the maintenance of the organization, thus maintaining their status as "active members".

According to the WCRC Constitution, Article VI.J.6, inactive churches that cease contributing financially to the organization's support for 3 consecutive years without justification lose the right to voice and vote in the organization's assemblies, and may only participate as observers.

However, in 2025, the organization listed 170 active members (including 1 affiliated theological institute, 1 affiliated denomination, 1 associated denomination, 2 former members - Evangelical Presbyterian Church and United Free Church of Scotland - and 165 full member denominations), and 60 inactive members (all full members).

Therefore, the General Assembly determined that the General Secretary should notify inactive member churches of their delinquency, giving them the option to regularize their financial contributions or leave the organization.

African and Asian denominations represent 86% of CMIR's 100 million members. However, churches in Europe and Northern America, which represent less than 10% of individual members, are responsible for more than 85% of WCRC's financial contributions. Thus, only 51 denominations, mostly from Europe and Northern America, actually participate in governance, have the right to voice their opinions and vote in the WCRC.

For this reason, WCRC resolutions are generally more aligned with the theology and practice of the European and Northern American members, who are generally more liberal and ecumenical, than with African and Asian churches, which tend to be more conservative.

== Member profile ==
Year	Number of denominations	Number of individual members	% of global population
2010	225	80,000,000	1.14%
2017	233	100,000,000	1.30%
2025	230	147,191,682	1.76%

In 2010, at the time of the WCRC's founding, it was estimated that the organization had 80 million members, with about 225 member churches.

In 2017, there were an estimated 100 million members in its 233 member churches.

The Third General Assembly was held in October 2025. However, new statistics have not yet been released. However, considering the most up-to-date statistics of WCRC member churches, the full member denominations of the WCRC have a combined membership of about 108.3 million.

Including associate and affiliate members, the combined membership of the denominations themselves amounts to about 147.4 million.

The Presbyterian, Reformed, Congregational, and Waldensian denominations have a combined membership of 75.7 million.

The United Churches (including the China Christian Council) in the WCRC have a combined membership of 70.4 million.

The Disciples of Christ represented by the Disciples Ecumenical Consultative Council alone number about 1 million people.

=== Full members ===
==== Denominational subfamily ====
Denominational subfamilies in the WCRC by number of individual members (full members only)
1. Presbyterians (39.7%)
2. Continental Reformed (27.5%)
3. Ethiopian Evangelical Church Mekane Yesus (13.9%)
4. Others United and uniting churches (16.1%)
5. Congregationalism (2.70%)
6. Arminians and Moravians (0.07%)
7. Waldenses (0.03%)

Considering only 108.3 million full members of the World Communion of Reformed Churches, 39.73% of individual members are Presbyterians. The Continental Reformed Churches represent 27.47% of members and the United and uniting churches are 30.00%.

Among the united churches is the Ethiopian Evangelical Church Mekane Yesus. It is a denomination of Lutheran theology, with a synod of Reformed tradition. This is the largest denomination members of communion. Alone, it represents 13.88% of members. The others united churches account for 16.12% of the members.

Among the smallest groups within the communion are Congregationalism, which represents 2.70% of members. The Waldenses are 0.03% of the members of the communion.

Arminians and Moravians have historically not been considered part of the Reformed Tradition. However, together they represent 0.07% of individual members of the WCRC.

==== Geography ====
Geographical location of individual members represented by WCRC full members denominations
1. Africa (64.2%)
2. Asia (23.0%)
3. Europe (6.90%)
4. Northern America and the Caribbean (2.38%)
5. Latin America (2.83%)
6. Oceania (0.70%)

Among full members, the vast majority are concentrated in Africa, with churches on this continent representing 69.3 million people, or 64.17% of the membership. Churches based in Asia represent 24.8 million people, or 23.02% of the membership.

The continents with the smallest Reformed and United Churches full members of the WCRC are: Europe, with 7.4 million members, or 6.89% of the membership; Northern America and the Caribbean, with 2.50 million members, account for 2.38%; Latin America, with 3 million members, accounts for 2.83%; and Oceania, with 752,000 members, or 0.70%.

Although European and American churches are a minority in terms of membership, they represent the vast majority of WCRC's financial contributors.

In 2023, the financial contributions received by WCRC from member churches came from the following sources: 63.29% from Europe; 30.78% from churches in the Americas (30.65% from Northern America and the Caribbean and 0.13% from Latin America); 5.42% from Asia; 0.27% from Africa; and 0.24% from Oceania. This year, only 51 of the 230 member denominations contributed financially to the WCRC.

Considering denominations, the Presbyterian Church (USA) is the largest contributor to the WCRC, representing 21.35% of contributions received in 2023. The Protestant Church in Switzerland accounts for 12.46% of contributions, the Church of Lippe and Evangelical Reformed Church in Germany each contributed 10.57% of the amounts received that year.

The Protestant Church in the Netherlands accounted for 8.46% of the amounts received from members in 2023. The Presbyterian Church of Korea (TongHap) is the largest contributor outside of Europe and Northern America. This denomination accounted for 4.23% of the financial contributions received that year. The Church of Scotland contributed 4.09% in the same year.

=== All members ===
==== Denominational subfamily ====
Denominational subfamilies in WCRC by number of individual members (including associate and affiliate members)
1. China Christian Council (25.8%)
2. Ethiopian Evangelical Church Mekane Yesus (10.2%)
3. Other united churches (11.8%)
4. presbyterians (29.2%)
5. Continental Reformed (20.2%)
6. congregationals (1.98%)
7. Disciples of Christ (0.73%)
8. Baptists, Arminians and Moravians (0.09%)
9. Waldenses (0.02%)

The WCRC distinguishes between full members and associate or affiliate members. Full members have the right to speak and vote in all of its assemblies, with representation proportional to the number of members of each denomination. Only Presbyterian, Continental Reformed, Congregational, Waldensian, Moravian, and United or Uniting denominations can be full members.

Associate members are fellowships and associations of churches, which include full members of the WCRC. However, associate members do not have the right to vote in WCRC assemblies.

The China Christian Council was originally a full member of the WCRC. However, in 2012, the change of its status to associate member of the WCRC was approved. The change of status was confirmed at the WCRC General Assembly in 2017. The Disciples Ecumenical Consultative Council, an international organization that brings together national denominations of the Disciples of Christ, with 4 united denominations that are also full members of the WCRC, became an associate member of the WCRC in 2010.

Institutions established by member churches or that are in agreement with historic Reformed confessions of faith may join as affiliate members, also without voting rights. The Baptist Community of the Faithful in Africa became an affiliate member in 2017.

Considering all 147.4 million members (including associate and affiliated members), the composition of the WCRC is 47.85% of United Churches, of which 25.82% is the China Christian Council, 10.19% is the Ethiopian Evangelical Church Mekane Yesus and 11.84% are other united churches.

The Presbyterians represent 29.17% of the total members, the Continental Reformed represent 20.16%, the Congregationalists 1.98%, the Disciples of Christ represent 0.73% and Waldenses represent 0.02%.

The remaining groups (Baptists, Arminians and Moravians) represent 0.09% of the total membership.

In addition to denominations, some theological institutions are also members affiliated with WCRC, such as Trinity Theological Seminary (Ghana), International Reformed Theological Institute and Network for African Congregational Theology.

==== Geography ====
Geographical location of individual members represented by WCRC full, associate, and affiliate member denominations
1. Africa (47.6%)
2. Asia (42.7%)
3. Europe (5.07%)
4. Northern America and the Caribbean (1.95%)
5. Latin America (2.08%)
6. Oceania (0.54%)

If associate and affiliate members are included, the total membership on the African continent reaches 70.1 million people, or 47.64% of all members. The China Christian Council, an associate member, when included, brings the number of associate members in Asia to 62.8 million people, or 42.72% of all members.

If associate and affiliate members are included, European denominations that are members of WCRC represent only 5.07% of the members, those from Northern America and the Caribbean represent 1.95%, those from Latin America represent 2.08%, and denominations from Oceania represent 0.54% of all members.

== Former members ==
In 2013 the WCRC received notice of disaffiliation from the Christian Reformed Churches of Australia, the Protestant Church of Reunion Island and St Andrew's Presbyterian Church.

Due to the WCRC's increasingly liberal stance, theologically conservative denominations left it in the 2020s.

On June 22, 2023, the Evangelical Presbyterian Church approved a resolution by which it withdrew from the WCRC and reaffirmed that it would base its global relations with other Reformed churches on the more conservative World Reformed Fellowship.

In June 2024, the National Union of Independent Reformed Evangelical Churches of France also withdrew from the organization.

In 2025, the Evangelical Reformed Church of Lithuania, United Free Church of Scotland and Sudanese Reformed Churches were removed from the list of members.

In 2026, the Synod of the Christian Reformed Church in North America approved a resolution to withdraw from the WCRC.

== Potential membership ==
Although it aims to unite all Reformed Christians, there are a large number of Presbyterian, Reformed, Congregational, Moravian, and United churches that are not members of WCRC. Together, the non-member churches that meet the membership criteria number 26 million members, which include:

- about 10 million members of United Churches:
  - about 9 million from the United Churches in the Evangelical Church of Germany (Evangelical Church in the Rhineland, Evangelical Church of Westphalia, Evangelical Church in Hesse and Nassau, Evangelical Church of Kurhessen-Waldeck, Evangelical Church of Bremen, Protestant Church of Anhalt, Protestant Church in Baden, Evangelical Church in Berlin, Brandenburg and Silesian Upper Lusatia, Evangelical Church in Central Germany and Evangelical Church of the Palatinate); and
  - about 1 million members of other united churches, such as the United Church in Papua New Guinea (748,000 members), Evangelical Church of Chad (200,000) United Church of Christ in Japan (195,000 members), among other united churches;
- about 9 million Continental reformed:
  - about 8 million members of the Church of Christ in Nations; and
  - about 1 million other mainland Reformed, such as Sudanese Church of Christ (220,000 members), Christian Reformed Church in North America (171,000 members), Dutch Reformed Churches (130,000 members), Reformed Congregations (107,000 members), Evangelical Indigenous Mission in Madagascar (105,000 members), Reformed Churches in South Africa (76,000 members), Christian Reformed Churches in the Netherlands (66,000 members), Moluccan Evangelical Church (65,000 members), Restored Reformed Church (60,000 members), among other continental Reformed churches;
- about 6 million Presbyterians, such as the Presbyterian Church in Korea (HapDong) (2.242 million members), Presbyterian Church of Brazil (703 thousand members), Korean Presbyterian Church (GaeHyuk I.) (633,000 members), Presbyterian Church in Korea (HapDongGaeHyuk) (497,000 members), Presbyterian Church in America (400,000 members), Orthodox Presbyterian Church in Cameroon (382,000 members), Kosin Presbyterian Church in Korea (376,000 members), United Presbyterian Church of Pakistan (250,000 members), Church of Central Africa Presbyterian – Synod of Livingstonia (200,000 members), Associate Reformed Presbyterian Church in Pakistan (150,000 members), Global Evangelical Church (146,000 members), Presbyterian Church in Korea (HapShin) (132,000 members), Presbyterian Church of Ethiopia (120,000 members), Korean Presbyterian Church (HoHun) (120,000 members), Evangelical Presbyterian Church (United States) (Note: former member of WCRC.) (119,000 members), Korean American Presbyterian Church (80,000 members), Evangelical Presbyterian Church of Sikkim (61,000 members), Presbyterian Church in Korea (Daeshin) (60,000 members),Presbyterian Church of Angola (60 thousand members), among other Presbyterian denominations;
- about 1 million Moravians; (Note: The Moravian Church has about 1.2 million members, but only 1 from its provinces; the Moravian Church in Cuba, with 600 members, has joined the WCRC, with all other provinces outside the organization.)
- about 500,000 congregationalists, such as the United Church of Christ in Zimbabwe (200,000 members), Conservative Congregational Christian Conference (51,000 members), Fellowship of Independent Evangelical Churches (50,000 members), Union of Evangelical Congregational Churches of Brazil (50,000 members), National Association of Congregational Christian Churches (41,000 members), among other congregational denominations.

== See also ==
- List of the largest Protestant denominations
