= Presbyterian Church in Grenada =

The first Presbyterian Church in Grenada was founded by the Scots, this was the St. Andrews Kirk and was associated with the Church of Scotland. It was opened on 14 July 1833. After the abolition of slavery in 1880, this work spread on the island. In Belair, Grenada and St. Patrick's in Samaritans progress was notable. In 1945 the Church of Scotland withdrew to support the mission in Grenada and St. Vincent Island. It was suggested to unite with the Methodist, but strong resistance occurred and later they associated themselves with the Presbyterian Church in Trinidad and Tobago, become the Northern Presbytery of that denomination. The church grew significantly. On April 20, 1986, it became autonomous. The Apostles Creed, Nicene Creed and Westminster Confession of Faith. The Presbyterian Church in Granada has four congregations and almost 900 members. It is affiliated with the World Communion of Reformed Churches.
