= Swaziland Reformed Church =

The Swaziland Reformed Church was founded in 1944 and become a congregation of the Dutch Reformed Church in Africa in 1967. Later the Swaziland Missionary Board was formed to coordinate the missionary work of the Reformed Church in Swaziland. In 1989 Swaziland become a Regional Synod of the denomination. In 1991 the Swaziland Reformed Church became independent and has 20 communities within which it is working. The church was a member of the Reformed Ecumenical Council and later became a member of the World Communion of Reformed Churches.

== History ==
The Swaziland Reformed Church was founded in 1944 when Efraim Khumalo was called as the first evangelist of the Reformed Church to work in Swaziland. In 1945 Rev. Frikkie Malan was called to Swaziland as a missionary of the church. He was followed by Jan Greyling and Louis Swanepoel. They divided the country in two (north of the Usutu river and south of the river) and each minister took responsibility for one part. On January 31, 1967 these parts were united again and become a part of the Dutch Reformed Church in Africa (DRCA). Northern Transvaal, Southern Transvaal and Western Transvaal Synods of the Dutch Reformed Church (DRC) financially supported the work in Swaziland. Rev Johannes Malan left Swaziland in 1977 and was followed up by Rev. Hennie Pretorius in 1978. Shortly afterwards he was joined by Rev. Peet Erasmus and Rev. Willem Fourie. On 17 May 1978, it was decided to divide the one Swazi congregation into three different congregations, with Manzini, Mbabane and Nhlangano as the three main centres. As these ministers left Swaziland to work in other congregations in South Africa, new ministers had to be called to Swaziland. In 1984 Koos Louw started work in the Hhohho congregation (Mbabane) and Hennie Basson started in the Manzini congregation, but was stationed at Siteki. In 1985 Arnau van Wyngaard started working in the Shiselweni congregation (Nhlangano) and Wessel Bester also joined the Manzini congregation and was also stationed in Manzini.

In 1989 these congregations founded a regional Synod within the DRCA. In 1991 the independent Reformed Church in Swaziland was formed, and no longer belonged to the DRCA. The first Swazi minister was Musa Shongwe. The Shiselweni congregation of the church is extremely active in the fight against HIV/AIDS.

== Theology ==
- Apostles Creed
- Athanasian Creed
- Nicene Creed
- Canons of Dort
- Belgic Confession
- Heidelberg Catechism
