= Chris Ferguson (pastor) =

Canadian pastor, theologian and social justice advocate (born 1953)

The Reverend Chris Ferguson
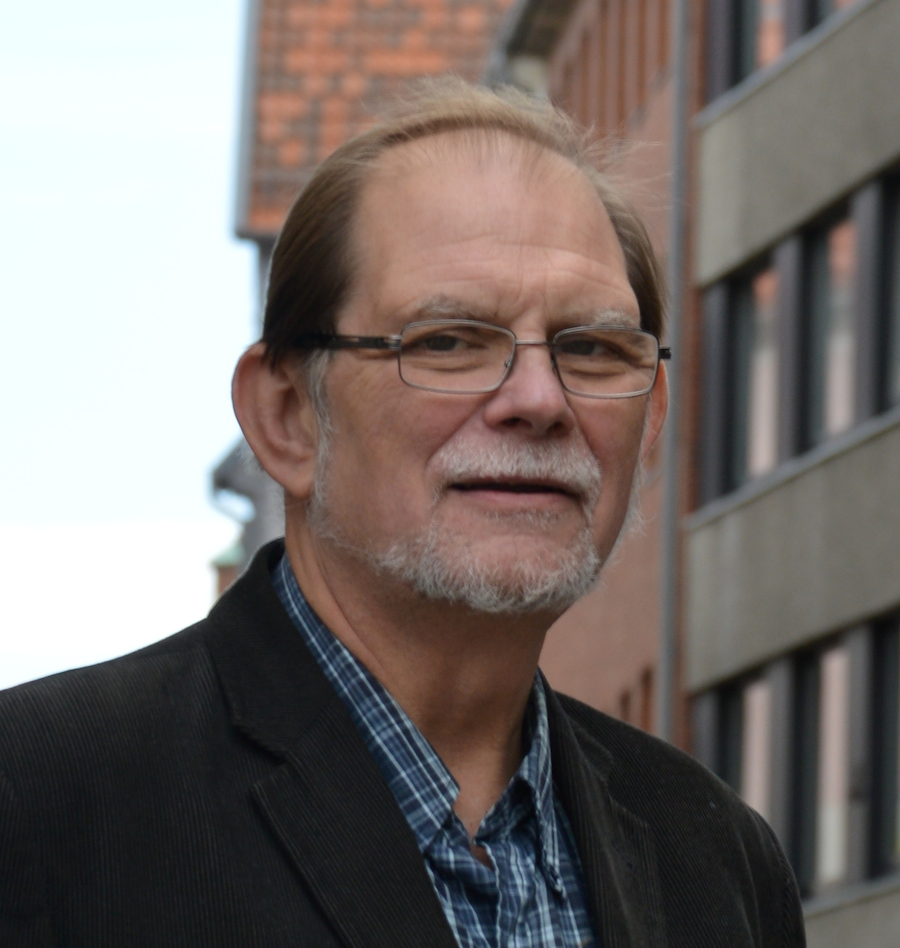
- Born: 15 May 1953 (age 73)
- Education: Vancouver School of Theology
- Religion: Christianity (Protestant)
- Church: United Church of Canada
- Offices held: International Visiting Professor at the Universidad Reformada in Barranquilla, Chancellor Of Qonakuy a platform of Protestant and Evangelical Universities in Latin America, General Secretary of the World Communion of Reformed Churches (2014-2021), World Council of Churches representative to the United Nations (2006-2010), World Council of Churches representative to Jerusalem (2004-2006), executive minister of the United Church of Canada's Justice, Global and Ecumenical Relations Unit and ecumenical officer (2002-2004)

Christopher Mackie Ferguson (born 15 May 1953) is a Canadian pastor, theologian and social justice advocate from the United Church of Canada. He served as general secretary of the World Communion of Reformed Churches from August 2014 through August 2021.

On November 6, 2021 Ferguson was appointed as Chancellor of Qonakuy a platform of Protestant and Evangelical Churches in Latin America.

He is International Visiting Professor at the Universidad Reformada in Barranquilla

== Biography ==
Chris Ferguson is the former general secretary of the World Communion of Reformed Churches, following Setri Nyomi. He is Visiting Professor of the Universidad Reformada in Barranquilla, Colombia. Since November 6, 2021 Chancellor of Qonakuy a platform of Protestant and Evangelical Universities in Latin America.

He is an ordained pastor in the United Church of Canada and has also served as the international ecumenical advisor for the Programme for Ecumenical Accompaniment in Colombia (2011-2014), the World Council of Churches representative to the United Nations (2006-2010), the World Council of Churches representative to Jerusalem (2004-2006) and the executive minister of the United Church of Canada's Justice, Global and Ecumenical Relations Unit and ecumenical officer (2002-2004). He previously served as the General Secretary of the Division of World Outreach of The United Church of Canada. From 1991 to 1998 he was the Area Secretary for the Caribbean and Latin America of the DWO. From 1987 to 1991 he served as overseas personnel with United Church of Canada as Professor of Theology and Ministry at the Latin American Biblical Seminary in San Jose, Costa Rica as well as visiting researcher at the DEI, Ecumenical Research Department.

Ferguson was Presbyterian - Untied Church Chaplain and Director of Chaplaincy Services at McGill University in Montreal from 1980 to 1987 during the same period he was adjunct Professor at the United Theological College and the Montreal Institute for Ministry. He was active in anti/poverty and community organizing and refugee advocacy and human rights work.

From 1978 to 1980 Ferguson was the minister/rector of United Church Anglican Ecumenical Parish of St. John of the Saguenay in Arvida, Quebec.

Chris Ferguson was ordained by the British Columbia Conference of the United Church of Canada in June 1978.

== Education ==
Ferguson holds a Master of Divinity degree from the Vancouver School of Theology (1978). He did his post graduate studies at the Universite de Montreal and received an honorary doctorate in May 2017 from his alma mater. He also received an honorary Doctor of Divinity degree from the Senate of the College of Serampore.

== Activities ==
As general secretary of the WCRC, Ferguson worked with member churches and ecumenical partners to fulfil the goals of the WCRC mission and vision statement. "Called to communion and committed to justice," the WCRC fosters church unity and coordinates common initiatives for mission, theological reflection and formation, church renewal, justice and dialogue. He led the peace and reconciliation program of the WCRC and was involved in ecumenical advocacy and action for peace and the defense of human rights in Israel/Palestine, the Korean Peninsula, Taiwan, Colombia and the Philippines.

Ferguson is also the co-rapporteur of the World Council of Churches' Reference Group for the Pilgrimage of Justice and Peace.

Previously, he was on the World Alliance of Reformed Churches (a predecessor organization of the WCRC) executive committee for a period preceding the 2004 General Council in Accra, Ghana, participated in the “Covenanting for Justice Process” and played an active role on the drafting committee for the Accra Confession.
