= Korean Presbyterian Church Abroad =

Churches in North America

Korean Presbyterian Church in America
- Classification: Protestant
- Orientation: liberal Calvinist
- Theology: Reformed
- Polity: Presbyterian
- Associations: World Communion of Reformed Churches, National Council of Churches, Christian Churches Together
- Region: United States, Canada
- Origin: 1976; United States
- Congregations: 302
- Members: 55,000

The Korean Presbyterian Church Abroad, formerly known as the Korean Presbyterian Church in America, is an independent Presbyterian denomination in the United States. It was founded in 1976 as a union of 3 Korean language Presbyteries. The mother church was the Presbyterian Church in Korea (TongHap). The church has a close relationship with the PC(USA) and the Korean Christian Church in Japan. In 2004 it had 29,000 members and 263 congregations. According to the recent statistics it has 55,000 members and 302 congregations. Official languages are English and Korean. The church uses the Westminster Confession and the Apostles Creed. Since 2010 it formed an English speaking presbytery. KPCA is a member of the World Communion of Reformed Churches. It is also a member of the interdenominational associations National Council of Churches and Christian Churches Together.

== Relationship with the Presbyterian Church of Korea (PCK) ==
KPCA started as a presbytery established by pastors with Presbyterian Church in Korea (PCK) backgrounds in Los Angeles, New York, and Chicago. Therefore, KPCA has had a very close cooperative relationship with Korean PCK from the beginning. KPCA signed the 3rd mission agreement with PCK in 2016 following 1986 and 2006 to strengthen friendship between the two denominations in Korea and the United States, and exchange information on churches, mission consultations, mutual cooperation, personnel exchanges, Christian education and theological education. It is a denomination that cooperates in cooperation with theologians, exchanges of theologians, and education of the second generation.

== Relationship with the Presbyterian Church (USA) ==
The “Covenant Relationship” of KPCA and PC(USA) was formally passed by the Presbyterian Church (USA) at the 218th General Assembly, and after that, it was approved through 176 presbyteries and is included in the Book of Order of the Presbyterian Church (U.S.A.). Then, a specific agreement was reached on the Orderly Exchange of Ministers and the Order of transfer of Congregations. The executive committee, composed of representatives of both denominations, gathers every year to promote cooperative relations with both denominations, and jointly plan and hold pastoral exchanges (transfer and support) and events (education, ministry, second-generation leaders, etc.) promoted by both denominations.

== Statistics ==
The Korean Presbyterian Church Abroad (KPCA) consists of 984 pastors, 22 Presbyteries, 470 local churches, and 81,383 members. The total Revenue of the Churches in the KPCA is $65,791,652 and the Budget of the General Assembly is $311,943.00 according to the Minutes of the 43th General Assembly held on May 7, 2019.
