= Evangelical Presbyterian Church in Chile =

The Evangelical Presbyterian Church in Chile split from the Presbyterian Church in Chile in 1972. The church partner is the Presbyterian Church (USA). It has 1,000 members and 12 congregations in 2004. The denomination subscribes the Apostles Creed, Athanasian Creed, Nicene Creed, Barmen Declaration, Heidelberg Catechism, Westminster Confession of Faith, Westminster Larger Catechism and Westminster Shorter Catechism. Member of the World Communion of Reformed Churches
