= VEG =

VEG may refer to:

- Covenant of Free Evangelical Congregations in the Netherlands, a Reformed denomination in the Netherlands
- Geisenheim Alumni Association, an alumni network in Germany
- Volkseigenes Gut, a state-owned farm in the German Democratic Republic
- .veg, file extension for projects in Vegas Pro

== See also ==
- Vegetable
