= Christian Church (Disciples of Christ) in Canada =

Christian denomination in Canada

- Église Chrétienne (Disciples du Christ) au Canada
- Classification: Protestant
- Orientation: Mix of Restorationist, Liberal, Progressive, Evangelical, and Pluralist
- Polity: Congregationalist
- National Pastor: Jean-Daniel Ó Donncada
- Moderator: Janet Astead
- Region of: Christian Church (Disciples of Christ)
- Full communion: United Church of Christ (1989); United Church of Canada (2019)
- Territory: Canada
- Origin: 1922
- Congregations: 21
- Members: 2,606
- Official website: www.thechristianchurch.ca

The Christian Church (Disciples of Christ) in Canada (French: Église Chrétienne (Disciples du Christ) au Canada) is a Reformed Restorationist denomination with 21 congregations across Canada. It functions both as a Canadian national church and as a region within the Christian Church (Disciples of Christ) in the United States and Canada. It is affiliated with the Disciples Ecumenical Consultative Council and the World Communion of Reformed Churches and has full communion agreements with the United Church of Canada and the United Church of Christ. The church claims 2,606 members.

== History ==
The Christian Church (Disciples of Christ) in Canada has its origins in a church founded in 1811 in Charlottetown by a Scottish immigrant. It was officially founded in 1922. It became a region of the Christian Church (Disciples of Christ) in the US in 1968. According to a denomination census released in 2020, it claimed 21 member churches.

== Beliefs ==
The denomination practices 'believers baptism' meaning that infants are not generally baptized.

Like other mainline denominations, the Disciples of Christ in Canada permits each congregation to decide whether to marry same-sex couples.
