= Presbyterian Church of Africa =

Christian denomination

The Presbyterian Church of Africa was founded in 1898 by the Reverend Phambani Jeremiah Mzimba, who broke from the Church of Scotland. He broke away because of misunderstanding between the black and white clergy. He was born in Ngqakayi, and his father was a deacon in the Presbyterian Church. Mzimba become a pastor, and was ordained in 1875. He was sent to Scotland to the anniversary of the Free Church of Scotland, but later severed its ties with the denomination. In 1898 he founded his own independent Presbyterian church. He died in 1911. The first Synod was constituted in Alice, Cape Colony. Mzimba had a dispute with the Free Church of Scotland over land and over the use of money. The Presbyterian Church of Africa is a predominantly black church. It was a small group of churches with 2 presbyteries. The church grew steadily. It is one of the oldest independent churches in Africa.

Churches are located in Malawi, South Africa, Zambia, Zimbabwe. In Zimbabwe the church has one presbytery. The headquarters of the church is in South Africa. It has 9 presbyteries, and church membership is 3,400,000 with 9,000 congregations and 600 house fellowships.

The denomination affirms the Apostles Creed and Westminster Confession of Faith.

It is a member of the World Communion of Reformed Churches.
