= Presbyterian Community in Western Kasai =

The Presbyterian Community in Western Kasai (it is also known as the Reformed Presbyterian Community in Africa, French: Communauté presbytérienne réformée en Afrique) was founded in 1982, due to a split in the Presbyterian Community in Congo. The Church of Christ in Congo made an attempt to introduce episcopal church government. The church resisted, but Pastor Jean Bakatushipa was in favor, he became a bishop. The Presbyterian Community in Congo excommunicated him. Pastor Bakatushiba founded this denomination because of this tension. It has 28 000 members and 500 congregations and 100 house fellowships. A member of the World Communion of Reformed Churches.
