= People's Church of Africa =

The Volkskerk van Afrika or the People's Church of Africa is a Reformed denomination in South Africa, it is member of the World Communion of Reformed Churches.

== Origin ==
In the early 1900s, feeling of discomfort arose in the Western Cape with the way the white missionaries ran the affairs of the black dominated congregations under their jurisdiction. Because of this two groups were formed, originally they didn't know each other's existence. Later these groups met to discuss the situation, and the influence and the role of the missionaries in the church. One such group was in Stellenbosch, the leader was Paul M. Phode, the other group was in Cape Town, the leader was J. J. H. Forbes. The first group formed the United National Church, the Peoples Church in Africa (Vereinigd Nasionale Kerk van Afrika, Onze Volkskerk) on August 14, 1921. In 1922 Rev. Forbes group joined the Volkskerk. The reason of founding a new denomination was not religious, the social and political reasons dominated. Peoples Church members are predominantly colored black African people.

In 2004, the church had 21 216 members in 220 congregations and 45 house fellowships. Congregations are in Eastern Cape, Western Cape and Northern Cape.

== Doctrine ==
The Peoples Church describes itself as evangelical, catholic, reformed, fundamental, charismatic, Presbyterian, Baptist, Methodist and Pentecostal. It is a member of the World Communion of Reformed Churches.

== Volkskerk Locations in the Cape Peninsula ==
- Bellville
- Belgravia
- Kengsington
- Elsies River
- Retreat
- Ravensmead
