= Reformed Presbyterian Church in Cuba =

The Presbyterian Reformed Church in Cuba (Iglesia Presbiteriana Reformada en Cuba) was founded in 1890 by Evaristo Collazo, who participated in the War of Independence. It is a member of the World Communion of Reformed Churches.

== History ==
The First Presbyterian Church was established in Havana by a Cuban Presbyterian minister. It closed during the civil war. The communities became a presbytery of the Presbyterian Church (USA). In 1900, American Protestant missionaries arrived, including many Presbyterians. They reestablished the Presbyterian Church. During the following 60 years, the church operated schools. In 1959, it closed its educational institutions. In 1967, the church became autonomous.

Since 1990, the church has experienced rapid growth. It has 3 presbyteries and 1 Synod. The church has 15,000 members and 60 congregations along with house fellowships. The church subscribes the Westminster Confession of Faith, Heidelberg Catechism, Second Helvetic Confession, Apostles Creed and the Barmen Declaration.

It has held a partner church relationship with the United Church of Canada since 1985.
