= Reformed Congregational Churches =

The Reformed Congregational Churches (Marshall Islands) is a breakaway of the United Church of Christ-Congregational in the Marshall Islands. This split represented a desire to return to the original Congregational roots of the denomination. The total membership is 4,000 in 9 parishes and 18 house fellowships.

The church is a member of the World Communion of Reformed Churches and its partner is the Congregational Federation of Australia.
