= United Church of Christ in Nigeria =

The United Church of Christ in Nations (Hadaddiyar Ekklisiyar Kristi a Nahiyya) is a Reformed denomination a member of the World Communion of Reformed Churches. The Church of the Brethren, the Sudan Interior Mission, Sudan United Mission begun collaborating in 1956 to build a church in the Armed Forces in Kaduna. This mission developed rapidly. Between the Sudan United Mission and Sudan Interior Mission arose a controversy over infant baptism. The Sudan United Mission withdrew in 1962 and with the leadership of Pastor Habila Aleiyedeno the new church grew significantly. In 2004 it had 66,000 members and 81 congregations and 12 house fellowships. There's no women ordination. According to the statistics there are over 100 congregations, 35 ministers.
