= African Protestant Church =

Christian church in Cameroon

The African Protestant Church was established by American Presbyterian missionaries in Cameroon. In 1921, the mission opened a Bible School, the Dager School of Theology, to train African leaders of the church. In 1934, a group was separated from this body. After several name changes it adopted the name Africa Protestant Church. Originally it has concentrated in the Lolodorf region, but spread other parts of the country.

In 2006, it had 10,000 members and 32 congregations. It has the School of Theology Abraham Nzie Nzouango to train pastors and church officers. It is a member of the World Communion of Reformed Churches and the World Council of Churches.
