= Reformed Calvinist Church of El Salvador =

The Reformed Calvinist Church of El Salvador (Spanish: Iglesia Reformada Calvinista de El Salvador) is Reformed denomination in El Salvador, that adheres to the Westminster Confession of Faith, the Second Helvetic Confession, Heidelberg Catechism, Apostles Creed, Nicene Creed and the Athanasian Creed. It was organised in 1979, and maintains a Reformed Biblical Centers for lay training. In 2004 the denomination had 3,212 members and 6 congregations and 10 house fellowships. It is a member of the World Communion of Reformed Churches. The Calvinist Reformed Church is affiliated with the Christian Reformed Church in North America.
