= Protestant Church of Reunion Island =

The Protestant Church of Reunion Island was begun when the French military chaplain held services in Tananarive in the 1950s. In 1976 the Egliese Protestante de la Réunion came into existence. The congregations bring together French, Créols, and people from Madagascar. Pastors were sent by the Protestant Federation in France. It subscribes the Apostles Creed, Nicene Creed and Heidelberg Catechism. In 2004 the Protestant church had 2 congregations and 2 house fellowships and about 600 members. Member of the World Communion of Reformed Churches.
