= Association of Reformed Evangelical Churches of Burkina Faso =

The Association of Reformed Evangelical Churches of Burkina Faso or Eglises evangéliques réformées du Burkina Faso, abbreviated AEERB, was started in 1977 by Pastor Kinza Lazare with 30 members. It separated from the Pentecostal Assemblies of God, a Pentecostal denomination. Lazare had studied in Benin, Theological Institution of Porto Novo, where he was acquainted with the Reformed Presbyterian tradition. The association was officially established in 1986. Local congregations concentrated mainly in the northern part of the country, and Ouagadougou. This work focused on the north side of the country. The church is engaged in rural developments.

The church has 40,000 members and 40 congregations, and 18 house fellowships. The Reformed Evangelical Church subscribes the Apostles Creed, Nicene Creed and the Heidelberg Catechism. It is a member of the World Communion of Reformed Churches. The church is growing quickly.
