= Evangelical Church of Cameroon =

Continental Reformed Denomination in Cameroon

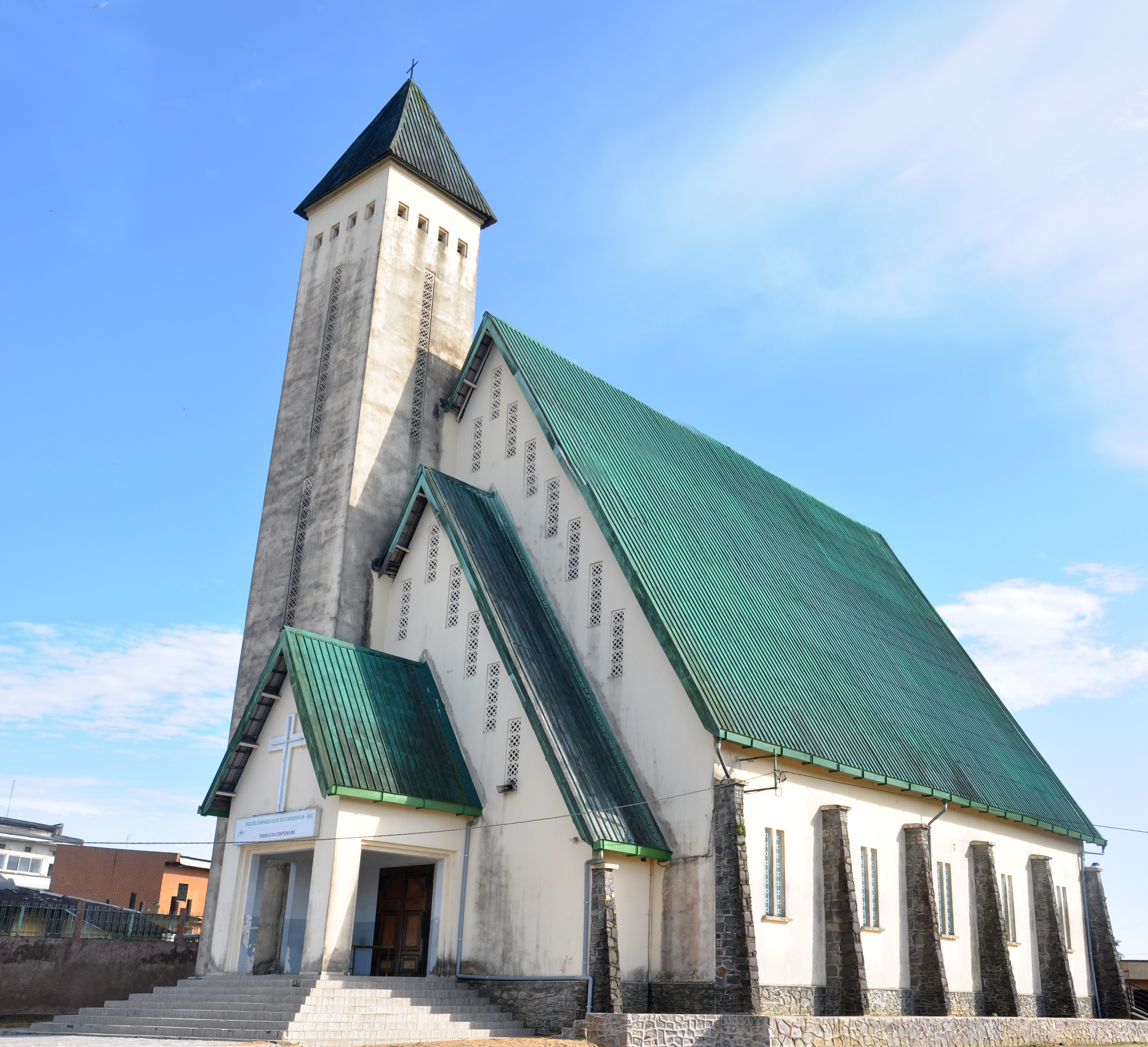
Temple of the Centenary of the ECC Church in Douala

The Eglise Evangelique Du Cameroun EEC (Evangelical Church of Cameroon) was born out of the European missionaries, the Paris Mission, Basel Mission and English Baptist Mission. After 1917 the Basel Mission handed over the majority of its mission stations to the Paris Mission. In 1957 the church become self-supporting and autonomous.

The church has its closest links with the Presbyterian Church in Cameroon, PCC with whom she shares a common heritage and also secondly with the United Baptist Churches in Cameroon, which become independent in the same year, and was under the supervision of the Paris Mission. The church has 2.5 million members in 700 congregations and 13 Synods in 2004.

According to the church statistics it has 2.5 million members 700 congregations and 14 colleges and 1 university.

Member of the World Communion of Reformed Churches.

== Gallery ==
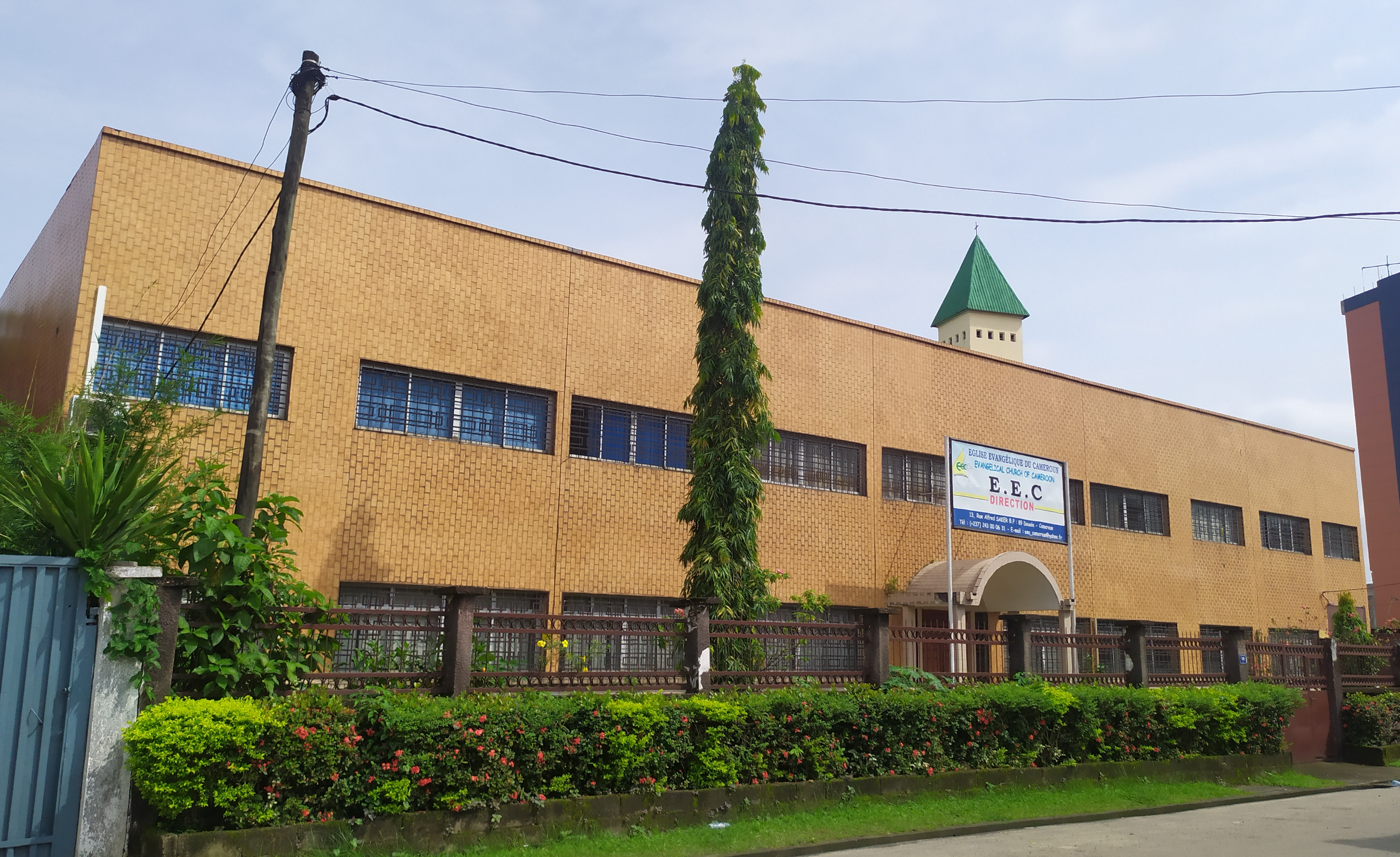
Head office of the Evangelical Church in Douala

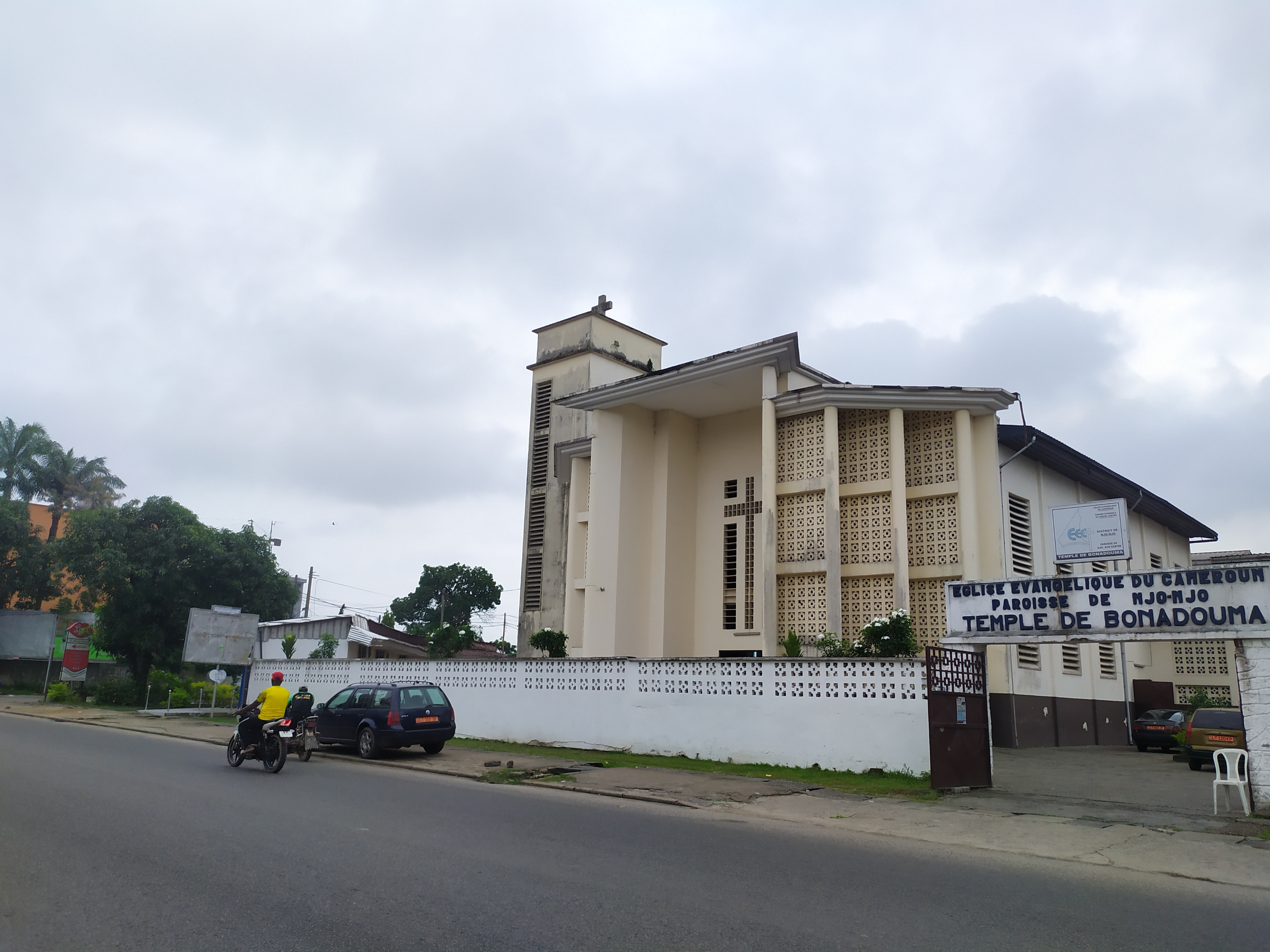
Bonadouma Paris of the Evangelical Church of Cameroon

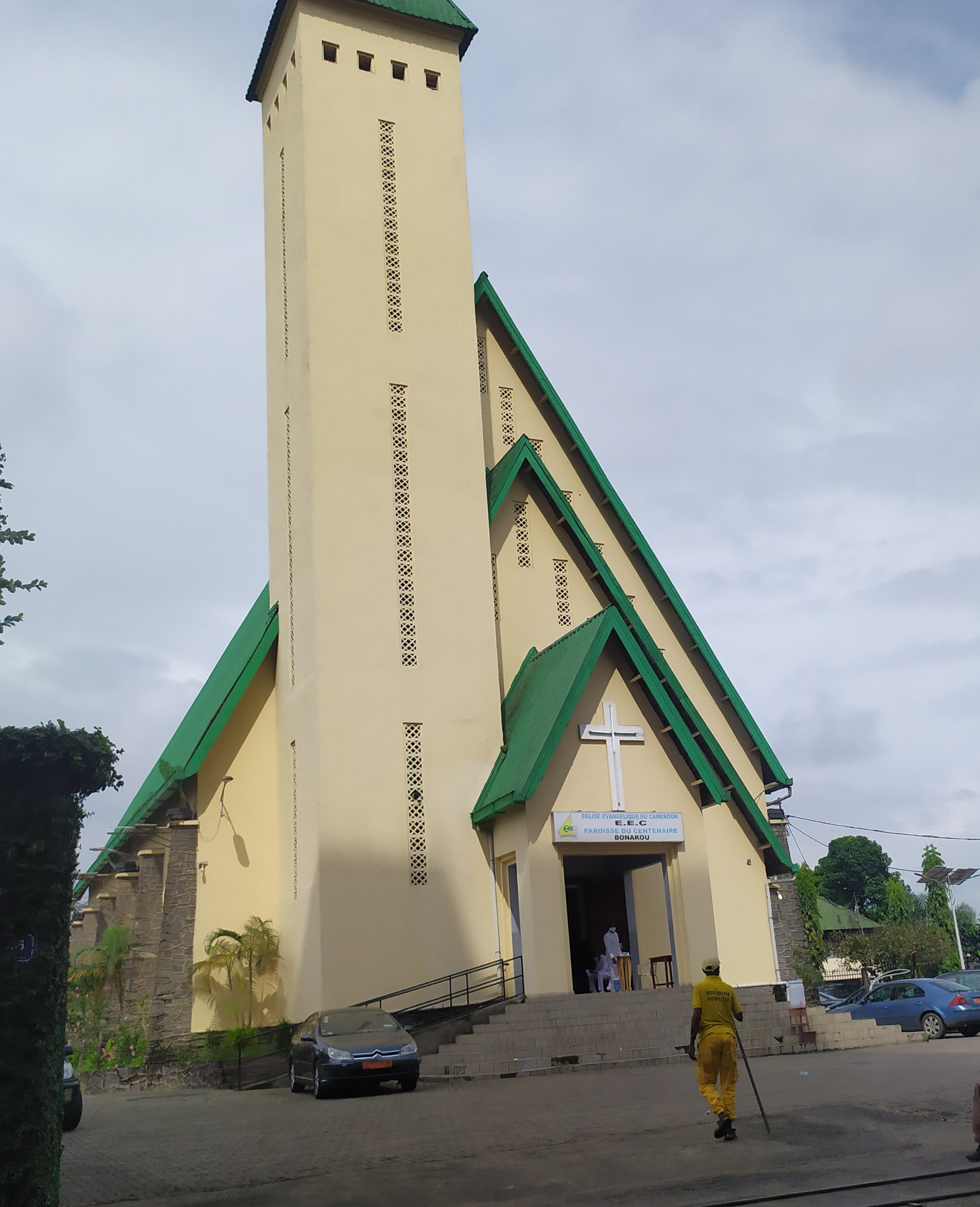
Temple of the Centenary
