= Reformed Church in Zambia =

Christian denomination

- Classification: Protestant
- Theology: Reformed
- Polity: Presbyterian
- Associations: World Communion of Reformed Churches
- Origin: 1898; Zambia
- Branched from: Dutch Reformed Church in South Africa
- Congregations: 154
- Members: 464,053 (2.6% from Zambia's population in 2022)

The Reformed Church in Zambia is among the biggest Reformed churches in the country of Zambia.

== Origin ==
Zambia, the former Northern Rhodesia, was governed by the British crown. In 1924 it became a British protectorate. The Reformed Church in Zambia grow out of the mission work of the Dutch Reformed Church of the Orange Free State, South Africa started in the end of the 19th century. The first congregation was established in Lusaka. African evangelists played a significant role of the establishment in the denomination. Members of the Dutch Reformed Church moved to Zambia, and the church expanded rapidly. In the late 1950s eleven congregations with 3,300 members were in Zambia. Since 1982 it extended its mission work into Eastern Province, Luapula Province, Northern, Central and Northwest Zambia. The denomination was an Afrikaans church, but English service were introduced in the early 1990s. By 2000 the Reformed Church in Zambia covers all Province of the country.

== Statistics ==
In 1996 the Reformed Church in Zambia formed. It had more than 500,000 members in 150 congregations, and 102 reverends and 39 evangelists. in 2021, the RCZ has more than 257 congregations, 180 Reverends, 38 evangelists in 17 presbyteries. The official languages are English, Nyanja, Chewa, Ngoni, Nsenga, Chichewa and Chewa.

== Theology ==
- Apostles Creed
- Athanasian Creed
- Nicene Creed
- Heidelberg Catechism
- Canons of Dort
- Belgic Confession

== Interchurch organisations ==
The Reformed Church is a member of the World Communion of Reformed Churches. The global ministries of the Protestant Church in the Netherlands supports the theological college and the department of economics.
