= Reformed Community of Presbyterians =

Churches in the Democratic Republic of the Congo

The Reformed Community of Presbyterians was separated from the Presbyterian Community in Eastern Kasai, because theological and ethnic differences. The church combines Pentecostal and fundamental practices. Elements of African religions are also interpreted in the church. It remains attached the Presbyterian origin, it became an African-Christian church. Membership was 12,000 in 21 congregations. It is affiliated with the World Communion of Reformed Churches.
