= Maranatha Reformed Church of Christ =

South African church

- Classification: Protestant
- Orientation: Continental Reformed
- Theology: Calvinist
- Governance: Presbyterian
- Associations: World Communion of Reformed Churches
- Region: South Africa
- Origin: 1923
- Separated from: Free Church of Scotland
- Congregations: 68 (2004)
- Members: 23,940 (2004)

The Maranatha Reformed Church of Christ (MRCC) is a Christian Reformed denomination founded in 1923, in South Africa, by former members of the Free Church of Scotland, due to disputes relating to the administration of the sacraments.

== History ==
In 1923, the Free Church of Scotland congregation of KwaZulu-Natal allowed unordained missionaries to administer the sacraments. This generated revolt among the members, so that 400 people split from the denomination and formed the Zulu Reformed Missionary Church, which grew up among the Zulu. From the planting of churches and the joining of others, the denomination spread to various parts of the country. Therefore, the name changed to Bantu Reformed Church.

In 1977, the denomination's first general assembly was organized and its name was changed to Reformed Church in Southern Africa (in Afrikaans Hervormde Kerk in Suidelike Africa). In 2006, the denomination changed its name again to Maranatha Reformed Church of Christ (MRCC).

As a predominantly black church, it has never merged with other white-majority Reformed denominations, but has worked closely with the Dutch Reformed Church in South Africa (NHK) since its founding.

== Doctrine ==
The denomination subscribes to the Heidelberg Catechism and Canons of Dort as its symbols of faith. Furthermore, it recognizes the Niceno-Constantinopolitan Creed, Apostles' Creed and Athanasian Creed as faithful expositions of biblical doctrines.

== Inter-Church Relations ==
IRMC is a member of the World Communion of Reformed Churches. In addition, it has close relationships with the Dutch Reformed Church in South Africa (NHK) and the Uniting Reformed Church in Southern Africa.
