= United Church of Christ in Mozambique =

The United Church of Christ in Mozambique was founded by American missionaries in the 1970s. In 1905, an American missionary with the help of Zulu workers from South Africa started mission work in Manica and Sofala. This suffered hardship because of the Portuguese authorities. In 1931, Gulhierme Tapera Nkomo was the first national pastor. Later, the Basel Mission supported the work. Today the church works in Manica, Sofala, Tete, Imhambane, Maputo Provinces. The headquarters located in Beira. It has 15,000 members and 22 congregations. Member of the World Communion of Reformed Churches. The President is Rev. Lucas M Amosse, the moderator is Rev Dandoga Chivaca.
