= Evangelical Community in Congo =

The Evangelical Community in Congo was established by Swedish missionaries, the Mission Covenant Church of Sweden, in 1881. The center of their activities was in Lower Congo, where British and American Baptist had already established mission points. The Svenska Missionsförbundet and the Baptists shared the beliefs of credobaptism. The church become independent and it shares a theological seminary in Kinshasa. The first year of the new denomination was marked by a revival of Pentecostal movement, but later it became more conscious of their Reformed heritage. It is a member of the World Council of Churches and the World Communion of Reformed Churches.

The church has 84,000 members and 87 congregations with 114 ordained pastors as of 2006.
