= Evangelical Church of the Republic of Niger =

The Evangelical Church of the Republic of Niger was founded in 1961. The congregations have considerable autonomy, so unity was very difficult to establish. It has 3,000 members, 31 congregations, and 59 house fellowships. A member of the World Communion of Reformed Churches. Partner church relationship with the Reformed Church in America was also established.
