= Presbyterian Church of Mauritius =

The Presbyterian Church of Mauritius emerged from the Church of Scotland and the Independent church of Mauritius' discussion with the help of the Rev Jean Le Brun in 1814, they created a single congregation. Now it consists of 4 French speaking, 1 English speaking (St. Columba in Phoenix) and 1 Malagasy speaking (Malagasy Parish) congregations . These are St. André in, St. Columba, St. Jean, St. Joseph, St. Pierre and Malgasy parish. The churches located in Rose Hill, Phoenix, Port-Louis, Grand-Gaube and Pointe-aux-Piments respectively. It has presbyterian church government with parish council, Presbyterial Committee and Synod and holds the Apostles' Creed as its statement of Faith. The Synod meets annually. Each parish choose its own elders. Baptism and Lords Supper is the recognised Sacraments. Total membership is approximately 800-900.

It is a member of the World Communion of Reformed Churches, Cevaa and All African Conference of Churches.
