= Reformed Church in Latvia =

The Reformed Church in Latvia (Latvian: Evanģēliskā Reformātu-Brāļu draudze) is a confessional Calvinist denomination in Latvia.

== Origin ==
This denomination currently has two congregations in Riga. The oldest Calvinist church was built in 1733, membership was mostly German traders and consisted of 1000 members till 1938. During World War II, the Germans left. In 1949, the Calvinist church joined the Evangelical Church of the Brethren and the Evangelical Brethren Community. The Evangelical - Reformed Brethren Community was formed. Later in 1964, during the Communist regime the church was transferred to a sound studio.

The church building was returned to the church in December 1993, the rededication service was held in May 1994. Since 1996, a pastor from Toronto serves the church. The Reformed Church in Latvia is a member of the World Communion of Reformed Churches.

== Theology ==
The church teaches the five Solas:

- Sola scriptura - Scripture Alone
- Sola fide - Faith Alone
- Solus Christus - Christ Alone
- Sola gratia - Grace Alone
- Soli Deo gloria - the Glory of God Alone

=== Creeds ===
- Apostles Creed
- Nicene Creed
- Athanasian Creed

=== Confessions ===
- Heidelberg Catechism (1563)
- Westminster Confession of Faith (1647)
- Canons of Dort (1618)

== Interchurch relations ==
It is a member of the World Communion of Reformed Churches.
