= Korean Christian Church in Japan =

Presbyterian denomination in Japan

The Korean Christian Church in Japan (Japanese: 在日大韓基督教会, Korean: 재일대한기독교회) was founded in 1909 by Presbyterian missionaries from Korea. Pastor Han Sok-Po evangelized primarily among Korean students in Tokyo. From 1915 the Korean Presbyterians send more missionaries and the church in Japan grew steadily. Congregations are in all parts of Japan. In 1934 the Korean Church in Japan was established, but in 1939 it was forced to become a part of the Church of Christ in Japan. After World War II it separated and held a General Assembly of the Korean Christian Church in Japan. The Apostles Creed and Westminster Confession of Faith are the official documents. Partner churches are the Presbyterian Church in Canada and the Presbyterian Church in Korea.

As of 2013, the denomination has 100 congregations and 7,200 members served by 116 pastors. It is a member of the World Communion of Reformed Churches.
