= Evangelical Church of Christ in Mozambique =

The Evangelical Church of Christ in Mozambique (or the Igreja Evangelica de Cristo em Mocambique in Portuguese) was a result of Presbyterian missionaries from Scotland. James Reid started working in the Zambesi region in 1910. In 1912 a mission station was opened in Alto Molocue. In 1913 the Scottish Presbyterian Church was founded, and was later renamed to Evangelical Mission of Nauela. The missionaries left Mozambique in 1933, the work was transferred to the Church of Brethren, 5 years later it was handed over by the South African General Mission. The Portuguese government closed the mission in 1959. Trouble period came. But the church survived. Several congregations remained faithful to their origin. The church governance is congregational. In 2004 it had 40,000 members and 500 congregations and 10 prayer stations.

It is a partner church of the Church of Scotland.

It is a member of the World Communion of Reformed Churches. Its headquarters are in Nampula.
