= Guyana Congregational Union =

Congregational denomination in Latin America

The Guyana Congregational Union was founded by the London Missionary Society in 1808. The mission spread rapidly after the abolition of slavery. The British Congregational Union in Guyana was formed in 1883. When the LMS withdrew its support the church almost ceased to exist. In 1908 the Colonial Missionary Society gave additional support. In 1942 outreach among the Arawak Indians were established. In 2004 it had 2,500 members in 45 congregations.

It is a member of the World Communion of Reformed Churches.
