= Costa Rican Evangelical Presbyterian Church =

The Costa Rican Evangelical Presbyterian Church (Spanish: Iglesia Evangélica Presbiteriana Costarricense) was formed in 1985 as the Fraternity of Evangelical Costa Rican Churches. Its original constituent members were five churches in metropolitan San José that separated from the Association of Biblical Churches in Costa Rica (AIBC). The denomination had 1000 members, 12 congregations and three house fellowships in 2004. Now, the denomination includes 24 worship communities. The denomination adopted its current name in 2005.

The Costa Rican Evangelical Presbyterian Church has official partnership with Presbyteries of the Presbyterian Church (USA). It is a member of the World Communion of Reformed Churches (WCRC), the Latin American Council of Churches (CLAI) and the Alliance of Presbyterian and Reformed Churches in Latin America (AIPRAL).
