= Presbyterian Church of Vietnam =

- Classification: Protestant
- Orientation: Reformed
- Theology: Calvinist
- Polity: Presbyterian
- Associations: World Communion of Reformed Churches and Evangelical Alliance Vietnam
- Region: Vietnam
- Origin: 1968
- Branched from: Presbyterian Church (USA)
- Members: 17,000 (2015)

The Presbyterian Church of Vietnam (PCV) is a Presbyterian denomination, established in the Vietnam in 1968. In 1975, at the end of the Vietnam War, the denomination ceased to function. However, it was refounded in 1998 and recognized by the government of Vietnam in 2008.

== History ==
The Presbyterian Church of Vietnam was founded in 1968 by missionaries from the Presbyterian Church (USA). However, after the Vietnam War ended, various religious groups faced religious persecution in the country and the denomination has been revoked.

In 1998, the church was refounded by Vietnamese pastors and recognized by the Government of Vietnam in 2008. Still, in 2015, the denomination reported suffering religious persecution by local authorities .

In 2015, it had around 17,000 members.

== Inter-church Relations ==
The denomination is a member of the World Communion of Reformed Churches and the Evangelical Alliance of Vietnam.
