= Presbytery of Lanka =

- Classification: Protestant
- Orientation: Calvinist
- Theology: Reformed Theology
- Governance: Presbyterian
- Moderator: Saman Perera
- Associations: Christian Council of Sri Lanka, World Communion of Reformed Churches
- Region: Sri Lanka
- Headquarters: Sri Lanka
- Origin: 20th century Sri Lanka
- Branched from: Church of Scotland
- Congregations: 3 (2006)
- Members: 500 (2006)

The Presbytery of Lanka is a Reformed Protestant Presbyterian denomination based in Sri Lanka. The denomination follows Reformed Christianity of Calvinist tradition and adopts the Presbyterian system of government.

In 2006, the Presbytery of Lanka had approximately 500 members distributed among three congregations. The denomination is known for its work in charitable services, social assistance, and community support, especially in contexts of economic crisis and social instability in the country.

== History ==
The Reformed presence in Sri Lanka began in the 19th century, from the Presbyterian missionary work of Scottish tradition, linked to the Church of Scotland. These initiatives resulted in the establishment of Reformed congregations in different regions of the country, initially focused on urban and colonial communities.

The Presbyterian congregation of Colombo was organized in the mid-20th century, followed by the formation of the Kandy congregation, known as "Scots' Kirk". Later, a third congregation was established, consolidating the Reformed Presbyterian presence in the country.

Over time, these churches began to work together, organizing themselves under a national Presbyterian structure, giving rise to the Presbytery of Lanka as a council responsible for the doctrinal, administrative, and pastoral supervision of the Reformed congregations in Sri Lanka.

== Doctrine ==
The Presbytery of Lanka adheres to the Reformed theology of Calvinist tradition, subscribing to historical confessions of Reformed Christianity and affirming the authority of the Holy Scriptures as the rule of faith and practice.

The denomination allows the ordination of women to ecclesiastical offices, including pastoral, presbyteral, and diaconal ministry.

== Structure and Organization ==
The Presbytery of Lanka adopts the Presbyterian system of government, in which the church is administered by councils responsible for the doctrinal, administrative, and pastoral life of the local congregations.

In In 2006, the denomination consisted of three local churches, bringing together approximately 500 members nationwide.

== Social Action and Charity ==
The Presbytery of Lanka stands out for its work in charitable actions, social assistance, and support for vulnerable communities, especially during periods of economic crisis and political instability in Sri Lanka. The denomination has participated in relief, pastoral care, and community support initiatives in partnership with international Reformed churches.

== Leadership ==
In 2017, Saman Perera was the president of the Presbytery of Lanka.

== Interchurch Relations ==
The Presbytery of Lanka is a member of the Sri Lanka Christian Council, participating in ecumenical initiatives and cooperation among Christian denominations in the country.

The denomination also maintains international ties through its affiliation with the World Communion of Reformed Churches, integrating the global communion of Reformed churches.

== See also ==
- Presbyterianism
- Calvinism
