= Sudanese Reformed Presbyterian Churches =

The Sudanese Reformed Presbyterian Churches (SRPC) are a unified body of Protestant Churches in Sudan.

== History ==
The Sudanese Reformed Churches was started in Khartum in 1992. On 31 October 2005 the Sudanese Reformed Churches were officially organised, in Khartum leaders met to discuss the need for a unified body that would govern these congregations and ensure that matters of doctrine and life, and growth (in the faith as well as numerically) would be soundly grounded on Reformed faith as taught by the Reformers (Luther and Calvin). A Committee was formed to provide leadership until such time as the first SRPC Synod would be held. The committee is now working out a Church Order and governing structure for SRPC, taking guidance from work done in these areas throughout history by Reformed Churches who have struggled to structure their church federations on the solid foundation of Scriptural principles. The first General Assembly was held in Khartum in 2009, the Second GA was held in Juba in 2011, and the recent GA was in May, 2013 in Malakal.

== Beliefs ==
The Sudanese Reformed Presbyterian Churches believe and confess that the Holy Scripture both (Old Testament and New Testament) are the complete, inspired, and normative Word of God and are the only infallible basis of faith and practice for Christian believers(2 Tim 3:16). SRPC adheres to the Ecumenical creeds of the Christian Church: the Apostles' Creed, the Nicene Creed and the Athanasian Creed, the Heidelberg Catechism, Belgic Confession and the Canons of Dort.

== Structure ==
SRPC has ten (16) congregations in the following areas of Sudan, 12 ordained pastors and 17 evangelists, and total about 2,034 members. 80% of the churches located in South Sudan, and 20% are in Sudan. In 2005 there were only 500 members. The Sudanese Reformed denomination is a cross-cultural church. Among the churches there are four congregations in Khartoum (Dar el Salam Sudanese Reformed Presbyterian Church, Abuja Sudanese Reformed Presbyterian Church, Soba Sudanese Reformed Presbyterian Church, Khartoum Sudanese Reformed Presbyterian Church), four congregation in Juba, Southern Sudan (Kator Sudanese Reformed Presbyterian church, Munuki Sudanese Reformed Presbyterian Church, Lologu Sudanese Reformed Presbyterian Church, Hai Malakal Sudanese Reformed Presbyterian Church), as well as Churches in Renk and Malakal, Southern Sudan. Until such time as the SRPC holds its 1st Synod, the SRPC is governed by a Committee composed of five (5) members. SRPC is exploring and hoping to adopt a Reformed Church order based on principles of church government as outlined in the historic Church Orders of the Reformed Churches (e.g. The Church Order of Dordt 1618-1619) with amendments to any articles that are not applicable to the situation as it exists in Sudan.

== Future plans ==
The SRPC is also planning for development of Christian schools (elementary and high schools) in Malakal, has begun to develop a taxi-cab fund generating project to work toward overcoming poverty and dependence. Gospel outreach (church planting) is planned in the following areas in the Southern Sudan: Wau, Aweil, Bor, Bentui, and Rumbek.

== Interchurch organisations ==
Member of the World Reformed Fellowship. Sister church relations with the Reformed Churches in South Africa was established.

- National level
  - Sudan Evangelical Presbyterian Church
  - Sudan Interior Church
- International level
  - Heritage Netherlands Reformed Congregations
  - Reformed Churches in South Africa
- International ecumenical level
- World Reformed Fellowship

It is also a member of the World Communion of Reformed Churches.
