= Evangelical Presbyterian Church of Iran =

The Evangelical Presbyterian Church of Iran was a joint effort of American Presbyterian and Congregational missionaries in 1834. First they evangelised the Assyrians and later worked in north-west Iran, in a region called Rezaieh. The missionaries wanted to revitalise the old churches, but their members who converted to Protestantism were forced to leave their old denominations. Various Protestant churches were established. In 1862 the first presbytery was organised, and later more presbyteries were formed. Meanwhile, these Presbyterian missionaries' ministry led to the formation of congregations from Armenian Christian, Muslim, Judaism, and Zoroastrian background. In 1934 the Synod of the Evangelical Church in Iran was formed. In 1963 it adopted the current name. The common language is Persian. Armenian and Assyrian are also used. It has 1,500 members and 7 congregations.

It is a member of the World Communion of Reformed Churches.
