= Protestant Church of Christ the King =

The Protestant Church of Christ the King was founded by French missionaries from different backgrounds like Presbyterian, Methodists, Reformed, Baptists. It was supported by the Paris Mission Society. After independence the church grew and relies almost exclusively on Central Africa. It has two congregations and about 700 members. Member of the World Communion of Reformed Churches.
