= Presbyterian Church in Rwanda =

- Classification: Protestant
- Orientation: Presbyterian
- Scripture: Protestant Bible
- Theology: Reformed
- Polity: Presbyterian
- Associations: World Council of Churches and World Communion of Reformed Churches
- Region: Rwanda
- Origin: 1907
- Congregations: 3,573 (2024)
- Members: 1,624,823 (2024)
- Official website: www.epr.rw

The Presbyterian Church in Rwanda (in French Église presbytérienne au Rwanda or EPR) is a Presbyterian denomination in Rwanda, founded in 1907, by missionaries of the Basel Mission.

In 2024, it was the largest Presbyterian denomination in the country, with about 1,624,823 members.

== History ==
In 1907, Protestant missionaries from the Basel Mission settled in Rwanda. After that, the Belgian Protestant Missionary Society also passed through the country and continued the previous mission. In 1959 the denomination gained independence and adopted the name Presbyterian Church in Rwanda. Since then, the denomination has strengthened its relationship with the Dutch and Swiss churches and, later, with the Presbyterian Church (USA) and the Evangelical Church in Germany. The church experienced strong growth until 1994. It maintained many primary schools and several secondary and vocational schools, as well as three hospitals and several local clinics.

The denomination lost many pastors and members during the Rwandan Genocide. Since then, he has worked for reconciliation between the country's different ethnic groups.

In 2004, it was the largest Reformed denomination in the country, with about 120,000 members, 74 churches and 38 pastors. The denomination is known for running clinics, schools, and other social work.

In 2006, the denomination reported to the World Council of Churches that it had 300,000 members, 92 churches, and 81 pastors.

In 2010, according to the Pew Research Center, 93% of the country's population was Christian and 4% of Christians were Presbyterian, which equated, at that time, to about 383,913 people.

In 2024, the denomination reported that it consisted of 7 presbyteries, 234 parishes, with 3,573 congregations, and 1,624,823 members.

== Organisation and Structure ==
The Presbyterian Church in Rwanda was strongly centralized during most of its existence. In 2008, with the decline of foreign contributions, it started an decentralisation process in order to give more responsibility to the parishes and encourage them to be more autonomous and self-sufficient. This process is not yet finished as the coaching and support of the parishes is a long and complex task.

=== Decentralisation ===
The EPR (for the French name "Église Presbyteriénne au Rwanda") is now composed of seven autonomous presbyteries located all around the country. There still is an office of The General Synod, which acts as the Headquarters of the Church, in Kigali. It is in charge of most of the administration and organisation of the Church.

The seven Presbyteries listed below have now replaced the 13 old synodal regions. Each includes a certain number of Parishes.

- Kigali (33 Parishes)
- Rubengera (34 Parishes)
- Remera (14 Parishes)
- Kirinda (12 Parishes)
- Gisenyi (20 Parishes)
- Gitarama (16 Parishes)
- Zinga (17 Parishes)

== Activities and Programs ==
The Presbyterian Church has always been taking care of Education and Healthcare anywhere it was present in the country. It still is today but in collaboration with the State of Rwanda.

It is also involved in environmental protection projects and in the diversification of the know-how in rural areas. In some regions of Rwanda, agriculture has traditionally always been seen as the only way to make a living. This often led to over use of soils and ignorance of existing professional alternatives.

The official themes the Church is working on and actively supporting are:

- Education
- Community Development
- Healthcare

In these areas the church actively manages 100 schools, 7 locality health centers, and 2 hospitals. The church runs a care center for homeless youth, operating in Kigali, it provides education, housing, and food for over 100 young boys.

== General ==
In the post genocide era the church pursues reconciliatory practices between victims and perpetrators of the Genocide. Micro loans are given by the church to promote stable social ties within the community through a common financial ground. Today there are 7 “Unity and Reconciliation Commissions, 1 located within each of the presbyteries. Subgroups of "UFC's" operate within each of the churches congregations. The government "NURC" as well as local "URC's" collaborate on the annual "Week of Commemoration" in order to commemorate those lost in the genocide.

The denominations affirms the Apostles' Creed and the Westminster Confession.

== Inter-church relations ==
The denomination is part of the World Council of Churches and the World Communion of Reformed Churches. It also has a close relationship with the Presbyterian Church (U.S.A.).
