= Najla Kassab =

Pastor in the National Evangelical Synod of Syria and Lebanon

Najla Abou Sawan Kassab is an ordained minister in the National Evangelical Synod of Syria and Lebanon (NESSL). She was elected president of the World Communion of Reformed Churches (WCRC) at its 2017 General Council in Leipzig, Germany.

== Biography ==
Kassab obtained her B.A. in Christian education from the Near East School of Theology (NEST) in 1987 and her Masters of Divinity from Princeton Theological Seminary in 1990. In 1993 she received the first preaching license offered to a woman by NESSL.

In March 2017, she became the second woman to be ordained as a minister in NESSL. For the past two-and-a-half decades she has worked with NESSL’s women and children’s ministries, including as Director of Christian Education. She was elected to the WCRC Executive Committee at the 2010 Uniting General Council.

In July 2017, she became the first woman to head the WCRC.
