= Disciples Ecumenical Consultative Council =

Reformed Restorationist Christian denomination

Disciples Ecumenical Consultative Council Disciples World Communion
- Type: Communion
- Classification: Protestant
- Orientation: Restoration Movement (Disciples), Reformed
- Polity: Congregational
- General Secretary: Paul S. Tché
- Moderator: Shernett Smith
- Region: 18 countries
- Headquarters: Indianapolis
- Origin: 1979; 46 years ago
- Congregations: 15,528
- Members: 4.5 million members
- Official website: disciplesworldcommunion.org

The Disciples Ecumenical Consultative Council (DECC), also named the Disciples of Christ World Communion, is a worldwide council of member churches associated with the Disciples of Christ, including United and Uniting Churches which Disciples churches have joined. It is an associate member of the World Communion of Reformed Churches. The headquarters is in Indianapolis.

== History ==
The Council has its origins in a meeting organized by the Christian Church (Disciples of Christ) in Nairobi during the World Council of Churches conference in 1975. The Council was officially founded in 1979 in Kingston, Jamaica by 12 denominations. According to a denomination census released in 2025, it claimed 18 member denominations in 18 countries and 4.5 million members.

== Member list ==
In 2024, the DECC had 18 members:

Country	denominational subfamily	Denomination	Number of congregations	Number of members	Year
Argentina	Disciples of Christ	Evangelical Church of the Disciples of Christ	7	700	2006
Australia	Churches of Christ	Churches of Christ in Australia	430	40,000	2006
Canada	Disciples of Christ	Christian Church (Disciples of Christ) in Canada	25	2,606	2006
Democratic Republic of the Congo	Disciples of Christ	Church of Christ in Congo - Community of Disciples of Christ	193	650,000	2006
Ghana	Churches of Christ	United Churches of Christ of Christ (Ghana)	-	-	-
India	United Churches (Presbyterians, Anglicans, Methodists and Disciples of Christ)	Church of North India	4,600	2,300,000	2025
Jamaica	United Churches (Presbyterians, Congregationalists and Disciples of Christ)	United Church in Jamaica and the Cayman Islands	194	14,000	2025
Malawi	Churches of Christ	Church of Christ in Malawi	4,000	75,000	1991
Mexico	Disciples of Christ	Association of Evangelical Christian Churches (Disciples of Christ)	-	-	-
New Zealand	Churches of Christ	Association of Churches of Christ in New Zealand	33	2,000	2006
Paraguay	Disciples of Christ	Disciples of Christ Church in Paraguay	12	-	2020
Puerto Rico	Disciples of Christ	Christian Church (Disciples of Christ) in Puerto Rico	105	19,000	2024
South Africa	Congregational	United Congregational Church of Southern Africa	1,000	1,500,000	2024
United Kingdom	United Churches (Presbyterians, Congregationalists and Disciples of Christ)	United Reformed Church	1,242	35,844	2022
United Kingdom	Churches of Christ	Fellowship of the Churches of Christ in England	63	2,621	2020
United States	Disciples of Christ	Christian Church (Disciples of Christ)	3,624	277,864	2022
Vanuatu	Churches of Christ	Churches of Christ - Vanuatu	-	-	-
Zimbabwe	Churches of Christ	Association of Churches of Christ in Zimbabwe	-	-	-
Global	Total	Ecumenical Disciples Advisory Council	15,528	4,919,635	2004-2024

== Beliefs ==
The Council is an associate member of the World Communion of Reformed Churches.
