= Africa Inland Church Sudan =

The Africa Inland Mission was founded in Kenya in 1885 and later moved to the Democratic Republic of Congo. The Africa Inland Mission started working in Sudan in 1949.

In good understanding with the Anglican Church in Sudan the church agreed to take up responsibility for the whole of eastern Equatoria. The rapidly growing churches concentrated in the western bank of the Nile.

The first Sudanese pastor was ordained in 1956 and in 1972 the denomination became fully autonomous. The church is based in South Sudan but also present in Sudan. It has 125,000 members in 340 congregations.

It is a member of the World Communion of Reformed Churches.
