= Reformed Church in Africa (South Africa) =

The Reformed Church in Africa, South Africa (RCA) is a Calvinist denomination which works primarily among the Indian community in South Africa. It has about 800,000 members, although it is open to all people. Most of its members are ethnically Indian converts from Hinduism, Sikhism, Jainism or no religion.

It was founded in 1968 in Pietermaritzburg as the Indian Reformed Church. The name of the denomination was subsequently changed to the RCA. In 2004, it had 2,386 members in 12 congregations and 14 house fellowships.

The RCA subscribes to the Apostles Creed, Nicene Creed, Athanasian Creed, Heidelberg Catechism and the Canons of Dort.

On 28 October 2012, the RCA celebrated its 40th anniversary of being established as the Reformed Church in Africa.

It is currently a member of the World Communion of Reformed Churches.
