= Protestant Community of Shaba =

The Protestant Community of Shaba, also known as the Protestant Church of Katanga, is a Reformed denomination in the Democratic Republic of Congo. It includes communities from other Protestant groups. Members are mainly Presbyterian people who moved from Kasai to the mining centres of Shaba. In 2004 it had almost 20,000 members and 28 congregations and 34 house fellowships. The Apostles Creed and Heidelberg Catechism are the official standards.

It is a member of the World Communion of Reformed Churches.
