= Church of Christ in the Sudan Among the Tiv =

Christian denomination based in Nigeria

N.K.S.T, officially Nongu u Kristu u i Ser u sha Tar or the Universal Reformed Christian Church, is a confessional Christian Reformed denomination based in Mkar-Gboko, Benue State, Nigeria.

The church is a multi-ethnic Christian community drawn from all nations and cultures of the world, united in the doctrine of Jesus Christ. Its self-proclaimed purpose of existence is to glorify God through worship and proclamation "of the Good News of Salvation" to all humanity, as well as observation of the sacraments as instituted by Jesus Christ, to strengthen the communion of the Saints in order to responsibly teach its believers and instill self-discipline.

The church has spread all over Nigeria. Its members are predominantly the Tiv people, but also people from other tribes in Nigeria. It was first introduced in Sai on 17 April 1911.

== Origin ==
The church was founded by the Dutch Reformed Church in South Africa. This mission work was among ethnic Tiv people. Later this work was overtaken by the Christian Reformed Church in North America. In 1957, the church became a self-supporting, autonomous and self-propagating denomination. The center of the denomination is in Mkar in Benue State.

There is also a Theological Seminary to train pastors at Mkar. The denomination has 200 congregations, 2,000 mission stations, and 400,000 members. The theological training of ministers is at Mkar Theological Seminary in Nigeria.

The denomination's Theology is Reformed, it adheres to the Three Forms of Unity. In the Synod in 2012 the church became the Universal Reformed Christian Church. The Church has about 500 primary schools 50 secondary schools and a university. The denomination has a new name, it is called the Universal Reformed Christian Church it was adopted in the Synod meeting in the Northern Nigeria Theological College.

== Theology ==
It recognises the Heidelberg Catechism and the Westminster Confession of Faith.

== Interfaith relations ==
It is a member of the World Alliance of Reformed Churches and the Reformed Ecumenical Council. It cooperates with the Christian Reformed Church in North America, which has its seat in Grand Rapids, Michigan. The Tiv are an ethnic group that speaks the Tiv language, which is a Niger-Congo-language. The denomination has sister church relations with the Reformed Churches in the Netherlands (Liberated).

== See also ==
- Christianity in Nigeria
