= Presbyterian Church in Chile =

First Protestant church in Chile

The Presbyterian Church in Chile was founded on June 7, 1868 in the city of Santiago and was the first Protestant church in the country. The Chile mission was coordinated by Dr. Rev. David Trumbull and the United Presbyterian Church in the USA. On June 13, 1883 the first Presbytery was organised in Chile. It adopted the Constitution of the United Presbyterian Church in the USA. Till 1963 the church was dependent on the United Presbyterian Churches Synod of New York. With the creating of 3 more Presbyteries, the church become independent from the American Presbyterian church in January 1964.

The church has one Synod in five presbyteries and 36 local churches. The current moderator is Rev. Daniel Vasquez Ulloa . The five presbyteries are North, South, Central, South Central, and V. (Fifth) Region Presbytery. The church affirms the Westminster Confession of Faith, Westminster Shorter Catechism, Westminster Larger Catechism, Heidelberg Catechism, Apostles' Creed, Athanasian Creed, Nicene Creed.An agreement between the Presbyterian Church in Chile and the Presbyterian Church of Brasil was made to help planting new churches in Chile. It is a member of the World Communion of Reformed Churches.

The denomination launched new church plants in 2013 in Santiago, Temuco, Antofagasta, Maipú, Chiguayante, La Reina, San Gregorio and La Serena. The church maintains the Presbyterian Theological Seminary.
