= Presbyterian Community in Kinshasa =

Founded in Leopoldville in 1955

The Presbyterian Community in Kinshasa was founded in 1955 in Leopoldville by the American Presbyterian Congo Mission. The church was involved in the Protestant ecumenical movements, in the Church of Christ in Congo. The church was divided because of theological issues and 1,500 members withdrew to Pentecostal churches. In 1995 the church had 40,000 communicant members, 10,000 youth and 86 active pastors. The church has partnership relations with the Presbyterian Church (USA). The denomination had 70,000 members and 74 congregations and 152 house fellowships in 2004. The church is a member of the World Communion of Reformed Churches.
