= Covenant of Free Evangelical Congregations in the Netherlands =

Reformed denomination in the Netherlands

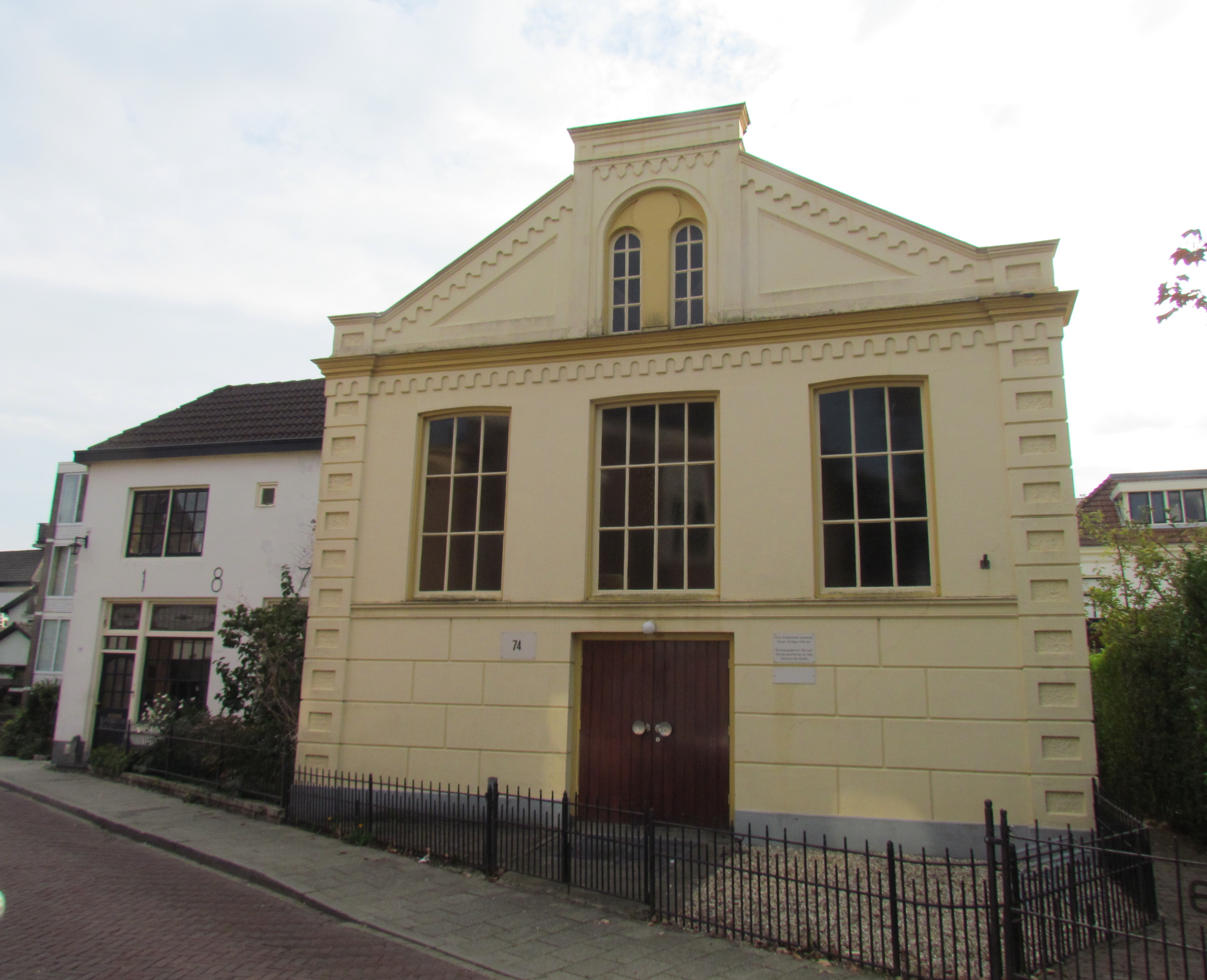
Church of the Free Evangelical Congregations in Velp, Gelderland

Covenant of Free Evangelical Congregations in the Netherlands (Dutch: Bond van Vrije Evangelische Gemeenten, abbreviated VEG) is a Reformed denomination in the Netherlands.

The VEG was founded in 1882 and was influenced by Methodism and the Revival Movement. It objected to liberal theology and state influence on the church, but rejected Reformed confessionalism. In 1993 ten congregations left the Free Evangelical Congregations, and returned to independency. It has a Faculty in Utrecht. The denomination began to collaborate with the Reformed Churches in the Netherlands and the Dutch Reformed Church. The church had 37 congregations and 7,000 members in 2007. In 2015, the Free Evangelicals had 37 congregations.

The VEG is a member of the World Communion of Reformed Churches. and the International Federation of Free Evangelical Churches. It has fraternal church relations with the main Protestant Church in the Netherlands.

It maintains its theological seminary in Amsterdam.
