= Presbyterian Church of Trinidad and Tobago =

- Classification: Protestant
- Orientation: Mainline Calvinist
- Polity: Presbyterian
- Associations: World Communion of Reformed Churches
- Region: Trinidad and Tobago
- Language: English; Formerly: Trinidadian Hindustani and Portuguese
- Origin: 1836 (established); 1893 (presbytery); 1931 (autonomy); 1960 (mission status); 1977 (fully independent)
- Congregations: 108
- Members: 40,000
- Primary schools: 72
- Secondary schools: 5
- Tertiary institutions: 1
- Official website: www.pctt.org.tt

The Presbyterian Church of Trinidad and Tobago is a Presbyterian church in Trinidad and Tobago, established by missionaries from the Presbyterian Church in Canada.

== History ==
Presbyterianism was established in Trinidad with the arrival of missionary Alexander Kennedy from Scotland in 1836. Kennedy, whose mission was sponsored by the Greyfriars Church in Glasgow, first held services in Port of Spain's methodist church and in 1838 relocated to a newly erected church, Greyfriars Church, still in operation today.

The Presbyterians in the Maritime Provinces of Canada decided to work in Trinidad in 1868 among Indian immigrants. When Rev. Morton from the Presbyterian Church in Nova Scotia visited the sugar estates islands of the East Indian Company, he asked the church in Canada to do mission there. When Rev. Morton, his wife and their daughter arrived in Trinidad the United Presbyterian Church in Scotland was established at lere Village in Princes Town since the 1830s. But this small mission was about to collapse, the American church agreed to hand over the mission to the Canadians. Later Rev. Kenneth J. Grant opened a new mission in San Fernando in 1870, In 1871 the first primary school was opened. In 1872 the Susamachar church - which is today the biggest Presbyterian congregation - opened its facility in San Fernando. In 1874 work commenced in Couva. In 1876 missionary work expanded in Cedros, Caroni, Tunapuna and Guaico. By 1880 4 mission stations were established in Couva, Princes Town, San Fernando and Tunapuna. In 1883 the first secondary school was opened. In 1891 the communities planted by Canadian and Scottish ministers were gathered into a Presbytery. In 1892 the Presbyterian Theological Seminary was opened. In 1893 the Presbyterian Church in Trinidad and Tobago was known as the Presbytery of Trinidad. In 1896 Rev. J. S. Wilson, a Scottish minister, established the Marabella Presbyterian Church which later become Wilson Memorial Presbyterian Church. In 1898 Morton Memorial Presbyterian Church built a secondary school. In 1931 the agreement between the Canadian Church and the Church of Scotland was dissolved, the work in Trinidad become an autonomous body. In 1941 the Cumato Presbyterian Church was established. In 1960 the church had a mission status in the United Church of Canada. In 1977 it became fully independent.

== Present day ==
The Presbyterian Church in Trinidad and Tobago has 40,000 members, 112 congregations and 100 house fellowships. The church maintains 72 Presbyterian primary schools and five Presbyterian secondary schools. Many notable persons in the society spanning law, medicine, academia and politics have come out of a Presbyterian School Education, whether Presbyterian or not. The only tertiary school is the St. Andrew's Theological College which has grown from a training center for local workers into a lay training and accredited theological college.

The official publication of the Church is the Trinidad Presbyterian The Church has already celebrated its 150th anniversary on January 6, 2018.

It adheres to the Apostles Creed, Nicene Creed and Westminster Confession of Faith.

This church is a member of the World Communion of Reformed Churches.

== See also ==
- Morton Memorial Presbyterian Church Facebook site:

Susamachar Presbyterian Church. St.Andrew's Theological College. Naparima Girls High School.
