= Associate Reformed Presbyterian Church of Mexico =

The Associate Reformed Presbyterian Church in the USA began to send missionaries to Mexico.

== History ==
In the late 1870s a presbytery was formed. The official beginning of the denomination is in 1879. The church is active in the Northeastern part of Mexico and in the capital city and Guadalajara. The church is now completely independent from the Associate Reformed Church USA. The denomination has more than 30,000 members in more than 60 churches. Currently there are 4 presbyteries, the Tamaulipas Presbytery. the Veracruz, San Luis Potosí and Las Huastecas Presbyteries.

== Doctrine ==
The church recognise the historic Presbyterian confessions:

- Westminster Confession of Faith
- Westminster Shorter Catechism
- Westminster Larger Catechism
- Canons of Dort
- Apostle Creed
- Nicene Creed

== Interchurch organisations ==
The Associate Reformed Presbyterian Church in Mexico is a member church of the World Communion of Reformed Churches.
