= Reformed Church in Mozambique =

The Reformed Church in Mozambique (Portuguese: Igreja Reformada em Mozambique) is a confessional Reformed denomination in Mozambique. It was founded by Dutch Reformed Church in South Africa, started Mphatso mission in 1909. This was in the Northwest part of the country, near Malawi. The work expanded rapidly. By 1919, 5 missions were opened in Tete Province. The Portuguese government inspired by the Roman Catholic Church closed the mission in 1922, and forced the missionaries to leave. Between 1922 and 1971 the church members had to meet secretly under trees and crossing the border to Malawi to attend Reformed worship. In 1972 the first black missionary called Rev Pedro Tempe started mission in South Mozambique, in Gaza Province.

Twenty years of painful rebuilding followed. Contacts among Reformed Christians were made in Tete, Mphatso, Benga and Mzewe.REv Pieter Botha and Rev Kobus Minnaar played an important role in this, both were former missionaries in Malawi. In 1975 the Igreja Reformada em Mozambique was officially registered by the government. First Synod was held in 1977 in Mphatso without pastoral present. In 1983 a big group of believers from Zambesia become part of the IPM.

A significant church growth followed this from 1992. More Dutch missionaries entered the South Mozambique. To train pastors the Recalta Theological School was opened. In 1996 a second Synod called New Synod was held, it took responsibility of the work in Gaza, Maputo, Imhanbane Provinces, but also started working in northeast Mozambique to the Tanzanian border. After the split in 1996 the two Synods developed rapidly. Later the third Synod the Thumbine Synod was formed in the northeastern Mozambique, due to rapid expansion in Zambesia Province. In 2004 a General Assembly was formed. In 2008 the denomination celebrated its centenary.

It had 70,000 members, existing in all provinces of Mozambique. It has about 20 Presbyteries and 3 synods, meeting in every second years.

The Reformed Church in Mozambique is a member of the World Communion of Reformed Churches. Partner church relationship was established with the Reformed Church in America.

== Theology ==
- Apostles Creed
- Canons of Dort
- Belgic Confession
- Heidelberg Catechism
