= Presbyterian Community in Eastern Kasai =

The Presbyterian Community in Eastern Kasai separated from the Presbyterian Community in Congo, because of ethnic tensions. The church belongs to the World Communion of Reformed Churches. The church suffers internal problems. It has 27 210 members in 104 congregations and 46 house fellowships.
