= Church of Christ in Japan =

The Church of Christ in Japan is a non-denominational religion that has 13,102 members and 137 congregations, and is a member of the World Communion of Reformed Churches. It sponsors missionaries in Korea, Hong Kong and Singapore.

== History ==
The Church of Christ in Japan was founded by American missionaries in 1872. J.C. Presbyterians Hepburn, S. R. Brown and the Reformed J. H. Ballagh were among the founders, in Yokohama. In 1877 the church unified with the Presbyterian Association. By the end of the 19th century membership was 10,500 and there were 72 congregations. In the following fifty years it was among Japan's largest churches. In 1941 the denomination became part of the United Church of Christ in Japan. In 1951, 39 congregations reconstructed themselves as the Church of Christ in Japan.
