= Christian Reformed Church in the Philippines =

Christian denomination in the Philippines

- Classification: Protestant
- Orientation: Evangelical, Dutch Reformed
- Theology: Calvinist
- Governance: Presbyterian
- Chairman: Rev. Ben Gonzaga
- Vice Chairman: Rev. Dennis Mongoso
- Secretary: Rev. Ruben Orteza, Jr.
- Associations: World Communion of Reformed Churches
- Region: Philippines
- Founder: Vince and Lucy Apostol
- Origin: 1962 (63 years ago)
- Branched from: Christian Reformed Church in North America
- Separations: Pearl of the Orient Covenant Reformed Church (2005)
- Congregations: 50
- Members: 5,000
- Official website: www.christianreformedchurchph.org

The Christian Reformed Church in the Philippines is a Calvinist denomination in the Philippines.

== Origin ==
The church was first organised by missionaries Vince and Lucy Apostol, congregants of the Christian Reformed Church in North America. The mission started in 1962 when Christian Reformed World Missions began planting churches in Negros Island. In 1976, the denomination was officially organized with three congregations. Churches were organised into five classes. A synod was formed in 1983. By 1990, it had grown to 25 organized churches and 20 church plants. Now the church has over 50 congregations and 5,000 members.

The Christian Reformed Church in the Philippines is a member of the World Communion of Reformed Churches.

== Theology ==
=== Creeds ===
- Apostles Creed
- Athanasian Creed
- Nicene Creed

=== Confessions ===
- Canons of Dort
- Heidelberg Catechism
- Belgic Confession

== Seminary ==
The Reformed Institute of Theology was founded in 1969 to provide theological training in the Philippine Christian Reformed Church. In January 1970, the seminary’s opening ceremony was held with an initial batch of 50 men and women. In June 1975, it became the Genevan Reformed Seminary. Finally, it became the Christian Reformed Seminary and Bible Institute. It is a growing institution, located in Bacolod, Negros Occidental. The bible school in Bacolod City is non-operational as of this time.
