= Accra Confession =

The Accra Confession is a doctrinal document adopted by the World Alliance of Reformed Churches at its 2004 assembly in Accra, Ghana. It states that "neoliberal economic globalization" is a system that impoverishes and oppresses people around the world and must be replaced by systems more in line with God's vision for God's world.
