= Evangelical Reformed Church of Christ =

Nigerian church

The Evangelical Reformed Church of Christ is a Calvinist denomination in Nigeria, founded by the South African missionaries.

== History ==
The Evangelical Reformed Church of Christ was founded in 1916 by the Sudan Missionary Society- South Africa Branch. The first missionary establishment was in Plateau State, Nigeria. Later the church expanded to eastern provinces of Kwara State, Niger state, Southern Zaria, Southern Plateau State, Akwa Ibon State. In the course of its history the name of the church was modified, it was called the United Church of Christ in Central Nigeria. The South African missionaries were expelled in 1972-1973. The church has grown significantly in the last two decades. The Church has approximately 1,500 000 members in hundreds of congregations.

== Doctrine ==
=== Creeds ===
- Apostle Creed
- Nicene Creed
- Athanasian Creed

=== Confessions ===
- Heidelberg Catechism
- Canons of Dort
- Westminster Confession of Faith
- Second Helvetic Confession
