= Dutch Reformed Church in Africa =

The Dutch Reformed Church in Africa (DRCA; Afrikaans: Nederduitse Gereformeerde Kerk in Afrika, NGKA) was a Reformed denomination in South Africa. It was a mission church of the Dutch Reformed Church in South Africa (NGK) exclusively for black people, formed in 1963 during the apartheid era. Originally it was mainly in the Free State and northern Transvaal.

In 1994 it united with the Dutch Reformed Mission Church (DRMC) – a similar denomination for coloured people – to form the Uniting Reformed Church in Southern Africa.
