= Exclusive psalmody =

Practice of singing only Psalms in worship

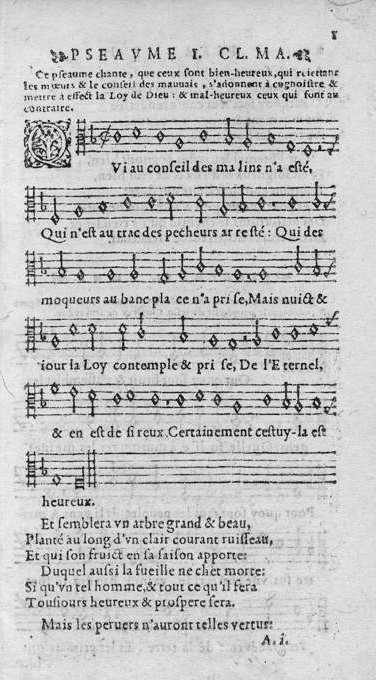
Psalm 1 from the 1562 edition of the Genevan Psalter

Exclusive psalmody is the practice of singing only the biblical Psalms in congregational singing as worship. Today it is practised by several Protestant, especially Reformed denominations. Hymns besides the Psalms have been composed by Christians since the earliest days of the church, but psalms were preferred by the early church and used almost exclusively until the end of the fourth century. During the Protestant Reformation, Martin Luther and many other reformers, including those associated with the Reformed tradition, used hymns as well as psalms, but John Calvin preferred the Psalms and they were the only music allowed for worship in Geneva. This became the norm for the next 200 years of Reformed worship. Hymnody became acceptable again for the Reformed in the middle of the nineteenth century, though several denominations, notably the Reformed Presbyterians and the Canadian Reformed Church, continue the practice of exclusive psalmody.

== History ==
The singing of psalms was included in the synagogue service at the time of Jesus. Early Christians continued this tradition, as well as many other elements of synagogue worship. The whole congregation may have sung, or there may have been a cantor who would sing each verse with the congregation responding by singing "Hallelujah." Such a pattern appears outside the psalms; each song in the obscure early Christian poetry collection known as the Odes of Solomon concludes with a "Hallelujah", indicating a similar liturgical purpose for its ancient users.

The Psalms of David formed the core of liturgical music for the early church, to which other songs from the Old and New Testaments (canticles) were added. In addition, early Christians wrote original compositions for singing in worship alongside biblical texts. Soon after the New Testament period, psalmody took a preferred position in the worship of the church. There was some hymn-writing in Eastern churches, but in the West psalms and canticles were used almost exclusively until the time of Ambrose of Milan at the end of the fourth century. Even then, the psalms were not completely replaced by original hymns.

During the Protestant Reformation, new church music was written in order to revive the practice of congregational singing, which had been replaced by the singing of monastic choirs in Latin. Martin Luther and leaders of the Reformed wing of the Reformation in Strasbourg, Constance, and elsewhere wrote music for psalm texts as well as original hymns, but John Calvin in Geneva used biblical psalms almost exclusively in the Genevan Psalter, though it contained some gospel canticles and catechetical songs. This psalter was to become a prototype for Reformed worship, but Calvin did not object to the use of original hymns in other churches, and he did not appeal to scripture in his preface to the psalter justifying his preference for the Psalms.

Once the Genevan Psalter was translated into German in 1573, exclusive psalmody became the dominant mode of Reformed congregational singing for 200 years following John Calvin everywhere but in Hungary. Anglicans had no theological objection to hymns, but they failed to nurture a tradition of English-language hymnody. Works like the 1562 English Sternhold and Hopkins Psalter were popular among the Reformed. Literal translations of the Psalms began to be preferred by the Reformed over the looser translations of the Genevan and Sternhold and Hopkins psalters in the latter part of the sixteenth century. Some of the most influential psalters of the seventeenth century were the Scottish Psalter of 1635 and the Bay Psalm Book of 1640, which was the first book printed in America.

Seventeenth-century Reformed theologians did not reach a consensus on the propriety of hymns in worship, and several argued that they were permissible, including John Ball and Edward Leigh. Thomas Ford also seems to have favored an inclusive rather than exclusive psalmody, while clearly preferring biblical psalms. Benjamin Keach, a Particular Baptist, introduced hymn-singing in his congregation in 1673, leading to a debate with Isaac Marlow, who opposed congregational singing altogether. By the end of the seventeenth century, hymn-singing was on its way to being acceptable among English Baptists.

In 1719, Isaac Watts, an early eighteenth-century English Congregationalist minister, published Psalms of David, Imitated in the Language of the New Testament, in which "imitated" means "interpreted," rather than being a strict translation. Some complained that his psalms were not translations at all, but paraphrases. Watts also wrote many hymns, many of which imitated the psalms. The rise of pietism in the eighteenth century led to an even greater dominance of hymns, and many of the Reformed reintroduced hymns in the early eighteenth century. Hymnody became acceptable for Presbyterians and Anglicans around the middle of the nineteenth century, though the Reformed Presbyterians continue to insist on exclusive a cappella psalmody.

== Possible Biblical basis ==
The practice of exclusive psalmody is sometimes based on a strict (sometimes called 'Puritan') interpretation of the regulative principle of worship, the teaching that only scriptural elements may be included in worship. However, John Calvin did not invoke such a principle in his justification for the practice. Later exclusive psalmodists contended that since God has given Christians a collection of 150 worship songs and provides scriptural examples of them being sung, God requires these songs to be used in public worship and forbids others to be sung (2 Chronicles 5:13, 2 Chronicles 20:21, 2 Chronicles 29:30, Ezra 3:11, Exodus 15:1). As such, "psalms, hymns and spiritual songs" in Ephesians 5:19 and Colossians 3:16 would serve as a hendiatris, referring to the various titles of the Psalms as used in the Septuagint.

Another basis would be the Christology of the Psalms, especially seen in Hebrews 2:12 quoting Psalm 22:22 as the words of Christ, demonstrating Christ being among the congregants during worship. The clean, pure and holy one of Psalm 24, who is able to stand perfectly before the Father, would also be the King of glory, and the only Mediator who can lead the congregation to worship the Father (John 14:6).

== Objections ==
One counterargument to the doctrine is the fact that exclusive psalmody (EP) implicitly prohibits the New Testament (NT) revealed name of Jesus in sung worship. The EP position is that the word ישוע ("yeshua") is used many times in the Psalms and it is the root source of the name of Jesus. The assertion is that this satisfies any requirement concerning the use of Jesus' name in sung worship. The complication arises when the context of the word in the Psalms is considered. ישוע is always used to speak of salvation, not directly as the name of the One who is the revealed source and author of salvation, namely Jesus. This may be theological/linguistic gymnastics to support a false conclusion. It is widely understood by the Christian community that the Old Testament, including the Psalms, only speak of Jesus in "types and shadows", not directly using His revealed NT name. The argument claims that to rightfully sing of Jesus as Lord and Savior, one must sing incorporating the proper name of Jesus (i.e., Joshua, Yeshua, Ἰησοῦς, ישוע) to refer to the revealed Jesus, which the Psalms do not do.

An additional objection to the doctrine aligned to the Regulative Principle of Worship is as follows:

1. The Psalms are a trustworthy guide to proper worship.

2. The Psalms command that we sing of the works and deeds of the Lord:

[Psalm 9:11 ESV] Sing praises to the LORD, who sits enthroned in Zion! Tell among the peoples his deeds!

[Psalm 105:2 ESV] Sing to him, sing praises to him; tell of all his wondrous works!

[Psalm 107:22 ESV] And let them offer sacrifices of thanksgiving, and tell of his deeds in songs of joy!

3. The works and deeds of the Lord Jesus are most fully revealed in the New Testament.

4. The Psalms command new songs (Psalms 33:3, Psalms 40:3, Psalms 96:1, Psalms 98:1, Psalms 144:9, Psalms 149:1).

Therefore, the argument goes, new songs concerning the works and deeds of Jesus from the NT are commanded and required for proper worship.

Additionally, EP doctrine does not allow the "whole council of God" to be included in sung worship, vs allowing it in all other elements.

=== Psalmos and the use of musical instruments ===
One objection to the non-use of musical instruments is that the Greek word ψαλμός (psalmos) literally means "a striking of strings". This means that the use of musical instruments is implied by the word itself.

== Denominations ==
Presbyterian denominations practising exclusive psalmody:

- American Presbyterian Church
- Associated Presbyterian Churches
- Australian Free Church
- Evangelical Presbyterian Church in Australia
- Free Church of Scotland (Continuing)
- Free Presbyterian Church of Scotland
- Presbyterian Church of Eastern Australia
- Reformed Presbyterian churches
  - Reformed Presbyterian Church of Australia
  - Reformed Presbyterian Church of Ireland
  - Reformed Presbyterian Church of North America
  - Reformed Presbyterian Church of Scotland
- Reformed Presbyterian Church of Malawi
- Southern Presbyterian Church in Australia
- Igreja Puritana Reformada no Brasil (Puritan Reformed Church in Brazil)
- Pilgrim Covenant Church (Singapore)

Dutch Reformed denominations practising exclusive psalmody:

- Free Reformed Churches of North America
- Gereja Jemaat Protestan di Indonesia
- Heritage Reformed Congregations
- Netherlands Reformed Congregations
- Nigeria Reformed Church
- Old-Reformed Congregations in the Netherlands (Oud Gereformeerde Gemeenten in Nederland)
- Old-Reformed Congregations (unconnected) (Oud Gereformeerde Gemeenten buiten verband)
- Reformed Congregations (Gereformeerde Gemeenten)
- Reformed Congregations in the Netherlands (Gereformeerde Gemeenten in Nederland)
- Reformed Congregations in the Netherlands (unconnected) (Gereformeerde Gemeenten in Nederland (buiten verband))
- Reformed Congregations in North America
- Restored Reformed Church (Hersteld Hervormde Kerk)

== See also ==
- Metrical psalter
- Rhymed psalter
- Psalter
- Congregational singing
- Reformed worship
- Hymnody
