= List of Presbyterian and Reformed denominations in Australia =

A number of Presbyterian and Reformed denominations exist in Australia.

== List ==
=== Active ===
| Name | Number of congregations | Bible translation | Singing | Origin | Notes |
|---|---|---|---|---|---|
| Evangelical Presbyterian Church | 2 | KJV only | Exclusive psalmody | 1961 | Formed in Tasmania by members who left other non-reformed denominations. Various Schisms. Denies free offer of the gospel. |
| Free Presbyterian Church (Ulster) | 4 | KJV only | 1970s | Independent churches approached and joined the Ulster FPC. | |
| Free Presbyterian Church of Scotland | 2 | KJV only | Exclusive psalmody | 1970s | Two churches created from Scottish preachers. |
| Presbyterian Church of Australia | 546 | | | 1901 | Formed in 1901 by a union of state Presbyterian churches. In 1977, two-thirds of the PCA amalgamated with other denominations to form the Uniting Church in Australia. |
| Presbyterian Church of Eastern Australia | 13 | | Exclusive psalmody | 1843 | The PCEA formed as a result of the Disruption of 1843 in Scotland. |
| Presbyterian Reformed Church | 3 + 4 others in South Pacific | | | 1967 | Originally PCA. Broke away over theological liberalism. |
| Reformed Presbyterian Church | 2 | | Exclusive psalmody | 19th century | Formed by migrant Irish Covenanters. Part of the Reformed Presbyterian Global Alliance |
| Southern Presbyterian Church | 2 | KJV only | Exclusive psalmody | 1986 | Originally EPC. |
| Westminster Presbyterian Church | 16 | | | 1970 | Began with support from the Reformed Presbyterian Church, Evangelical Synod. |
| Australian Free Church | 2 | KJV only | Exclusive psalmody | 1979 | Originally PCEA. Broke away over King James Bible. |
| Christian Reformed Churches | 60 | | | 1951 | Formed by Dutch migrants who were associated with the Reformed Churches in the Netherlands. |
| Free Reformed Churches | 17 | | | 1951 | Formed by Dutch migrants who were associated with the Reformed Churches in the Netherlands (Liberated). |
| Hungarian Reformed Church | 2 | | | After World War II | Formed by Hungarian migrants. |
| Communion of Reformed Evangelical Churches | 1 | | | | One church in Southern Tasmania |
| Reformed Evangelical Church of Australia | 5 | | | 2008 | Formed by Afrikaner immigrants to serve the needs of their community. |
| Reformation Presbyterian Church | 4 + 1 in USA | Masoretic Text and Textus Receptus | Exclusive Psalmody | 2010 | Opened in 2010 |

Notes:

- "Bible translation" column refers to versions of the Bible accepted. See also: King James Only movement
- "Singing" column refers to the manner in which songs are sung during public worship. See also: Exclusive psalmody

=== Defunct ===
- Free Presbyterian Church of Victoria, formerly the Free Presbyterian Church of Australia Felix, based in Melbourne 1846–1953 (joined Presbyterian Church of Eastern Australia)
- Free Presbyterian Church of South Australia, originated 1850, joined union which formed Presbyterian Church of South Australia in 1865, but minority led by Rev James Benny continued until the 1920s
- Free Church of Scotland (Continuing), one congregation in Adelaide, South Australia 2003–2010, now Gospel Presbyterian Church

== Timeline ==
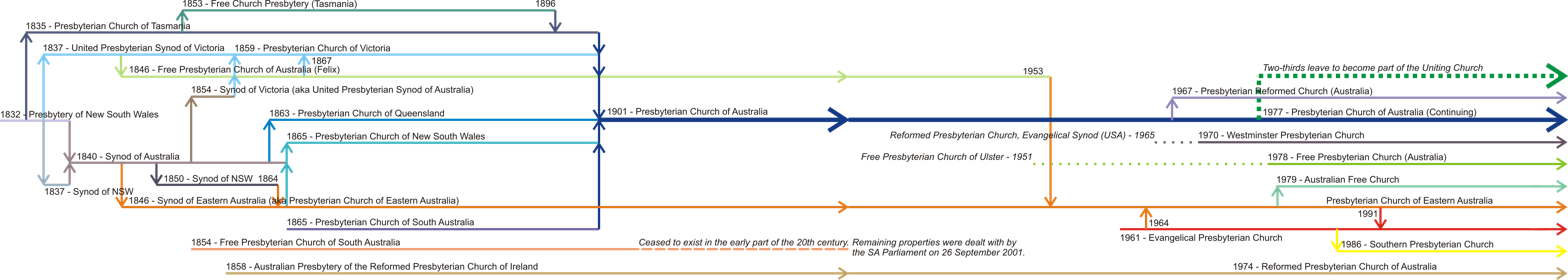
Timeline showing the various Presbyterian denominations in Australia
