= Presbyterian Reformed Church (Australia) =

- Classification: Protestant
- Orientation: Calvinist
- Theology: Reformed Evangelical
- Governance: Presbyterian
- Region: Australia, Fiji, Vanuatu
- Origin: 1967; 59 years ago Sutherland, New South Wales

The Presbyterian Reformed Church (PRC) is a Presbyterian denomination in Australia. The denomination was formed in 1967, as a result of growing theological liberalism within the Presbyterian Church of Australia, prior to the formation of the Uniting Church in Australia in 1977.

The PRC met for the first time in Sutherland, Sydney, on Sunday, 8 December 1967. Today it is made up of congregations in Queensland, New South Wales, Victoria, South Australia, Vanuatu and Fiji. During its existence there have also been congregations and/or mission works in the Australian Capital Territory, New Zealand, Papua New Guinea and Kenya, but these have not continued.

== History ==
=== Events leading to the formation of the PRCA ===
The Presbyterian Reformed Church formed in 1967 because of the desire of its founders to maintain the gospel witness of the church.

The move to form a new church was a result of growing liberalism within the Presbyterian Church of Australia.

As early as 1901, a Declaratory Act was passed, which toned down the distinctive Calvinistic doctrines of the Westminster Confession of Faith and allowed liberty of opinion for ministers on a wide range of doctrines set forth in the Confession.

In 1936, the General Assembly of the Presbyterian Church of Australia, in a private session, shelved charges levied against Dr Samuel Angus who denied the deity of Christ and the inspiration and authority of Scripture as defined in Chapter 1 of the Westminster Confession of Faith.

In 1967, Professor Lloyd Geering, the Principal of the Presbyterian Theological College in New Zealand was brought up on charges of 'doctrinal error'. During his church trial he claimed that the remains of Jesus lay somewhere in Palestine and rejected the notion that God is a supernatural being who created and continues to look over the world.

Despite these views, Professor Geering was acquitted of the charges by the 1967 General Assembly. This acquittal can rightfully be considered the immediate cause of the formation of the Presbyterian Reformed Church of Australia.

=== Since the formation of the PRCA ===
For the first 6 months of its existence, the Presbyterian Reformed Church consisted of the congregation at Sutherland. During the second half of 1968, congregations were established in Brisbane, Ryde and Wagga Wagga. During 1969 a youth group of over 20 people at Cronulla Presbyterian became part of the PRC.

The PRC has grown to include congregations in Queensland, New South Wales, Victoria and South Australia, and as a result of missionary work have established congregations in Vanuatu and Fiji. Other works have been undertaken in the Australian Capital Territory, New Zealand, Papua New Guinea and Kenya, but the congregations established in those areas have not continued.

== Doctrine ==
The Presbyterian Reformed Church receives the Bible (consisting of the sixty six books of the Old and New Testament) as the inspired word of God and the only foundation for how to serve God and live as Christians.

Being a Reformed Church, it holds to the Calvinistic system of Biblical truth and receives the Westminster Confession of Faith as it Confessional standard, with a few stated amendments, including adding a chapter on the free offer of the gospel. The full text of the Westminster Confession of Faith, with stated amendments, can be found here.

In summary, the PRC believes:

- In the Triune God consisting of the Father, Son and Holy Spirit, the God who created and controls the whole world according to his excellent purpose and plan.
- That salvation is only by faith in Christ Jesus, whose perfect life and sacrificial death was sufficient to atone for sin in every person who believes in him.
- God's promise to offer eternal life in heaven after death to all people who believe in the saving work of Christ Jesus and the requirement of eternal judgement in hell after death for all who reject Christ.

== Government ==
The church is governed in the Presbyterian form. Each local congregation is governed by a group of elected elders, each of equal rank (including the Minister). Additionally, a council of elders from each congregation meet bi-annually to discuss and judge the denomination's beliefs and activities in various areas.

== Activities ==
The PRC denomination activities include:

- Regular worship services,
- Sunday School classes for primary school children,
- Youth studies and activities,
- Missionary outreach in Australia and overseas
- Publishing ministry through Covenanter Press
- Ministry training through John Knox Theological College.

== See also ==
- List of Presbyterian and Reformed denominations in Australia
- Presbyterian polity
