= Aannemers- en Timmerbedrijf Roozemond =

Dutch construction company

- Industry: Construction
- Founded: 1650
- Headquarters: Voorstraat 3, 4696 BJStavenisse, Netherlands
- Website: www.roozemondbv.nl

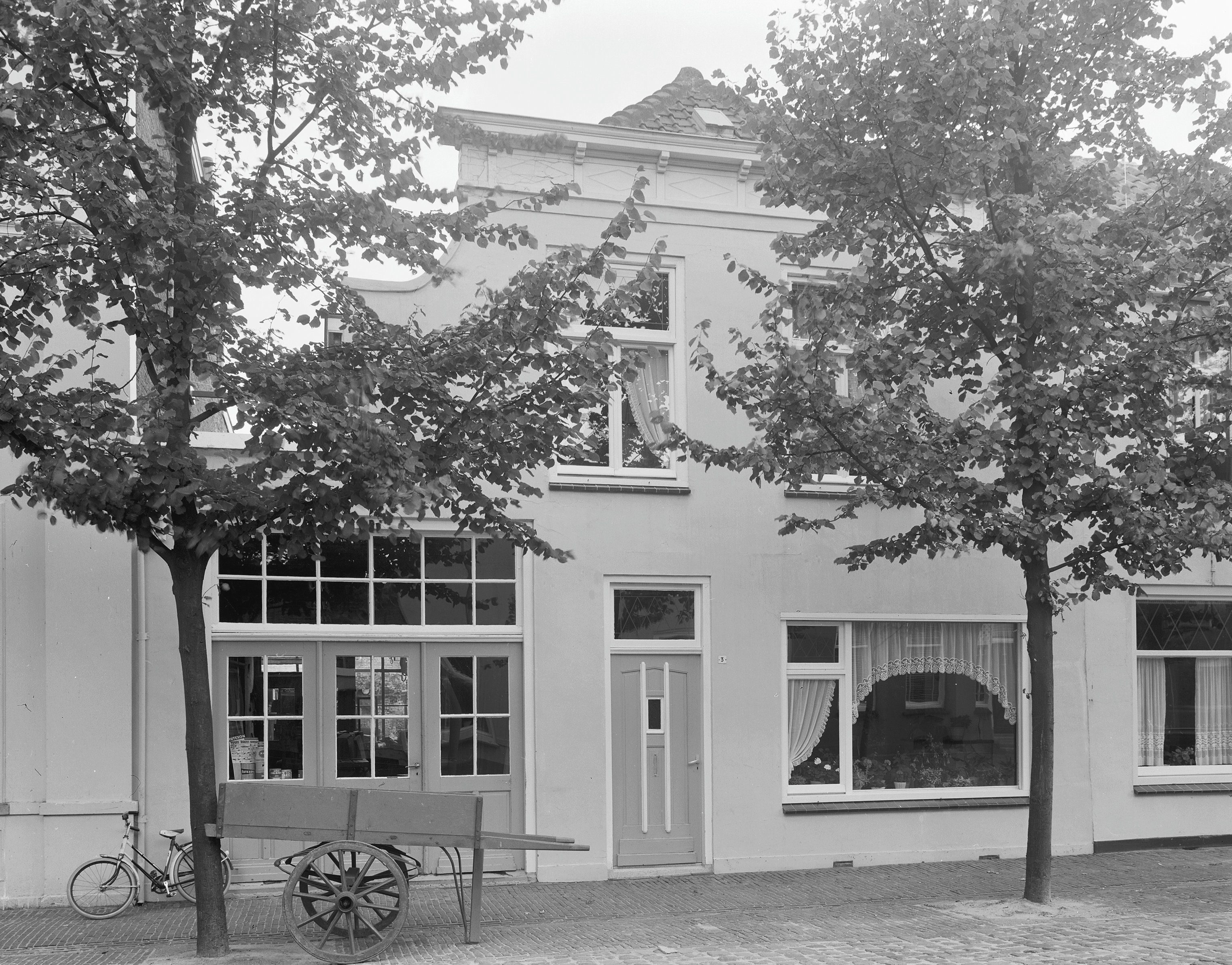
Company office in 1966

Aannemers- en Timmerbedrijf Roozemond is a construction company in Stavenisse, Netherlands, the oldest family business in Zeeland province founded in 1650.

The services include:

- construction of houses and roads
- reconstruction, renovation, restoration
- carpentry
- mechanical woodworking, etc.

== See also ==
- List of oldest companies
