= Southern Presbyterian Church =

Southern Presbyterian Church may refer to

- The Presbyterian Church in the United States
- Southern Presbyterian Church (Australia)

== See also ==
- South Presbyterian Church
