= Netherlands Reformed Congregations =

Conservative Calvinist denomination

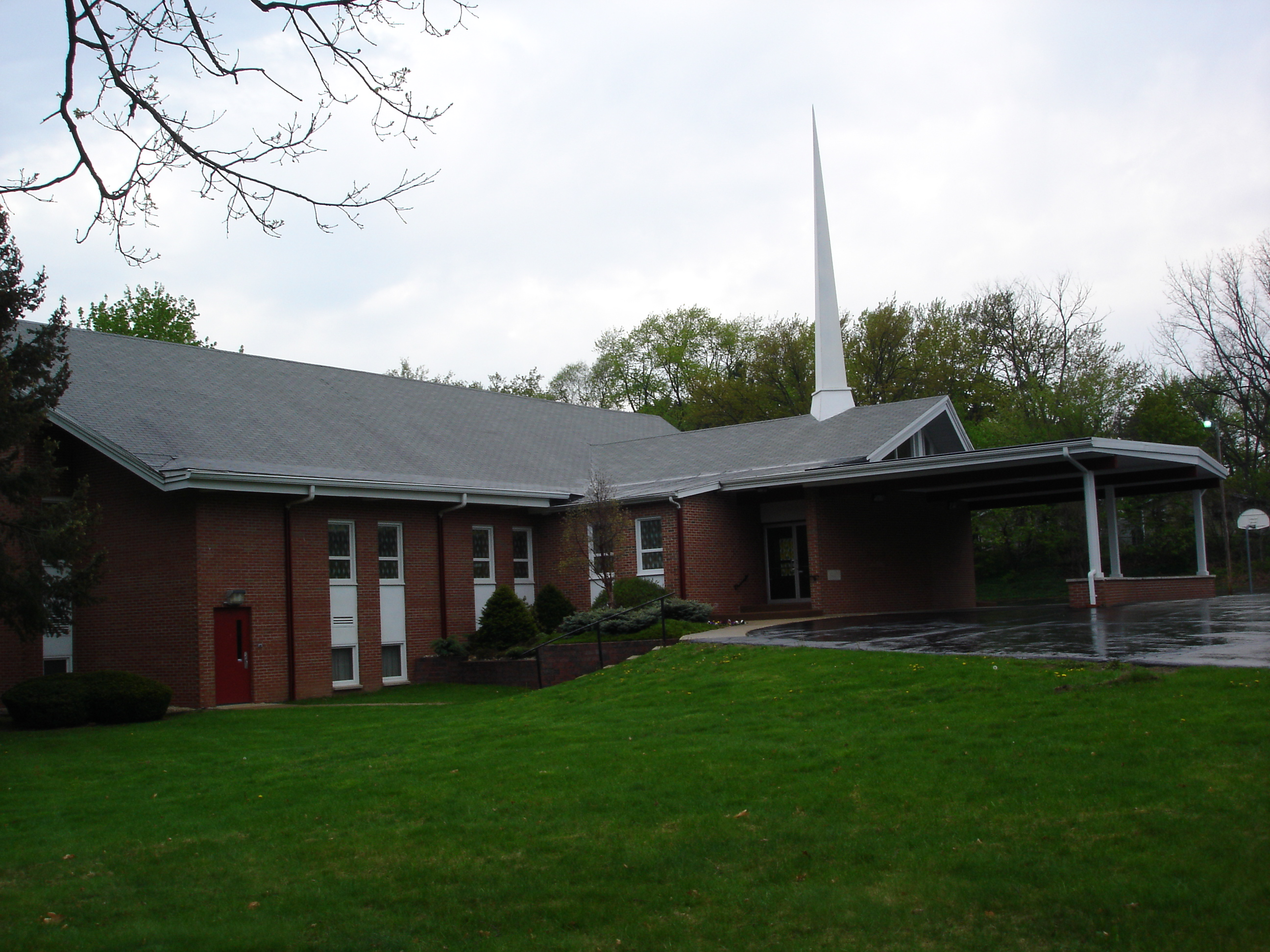
- Kalamazoo Netherlands Reformed Congregation
- Classification: Protestant
- Orientation: Conservative Reformed
- Theology: Calvinism
- Polity: Presbyterian
- Region: United States, Canada and Bolivia
- Founder: Gerrit Hendrik Kersten
- Origin: 1907; Netherlands
- Branched from: Reformed Congregations in the Netherlands
- Separations: 1967 some members formed the Reformed Congregations in North America & in 1993 groups from a number of congregations left to form the Heritage Reformed Congregations
- Congregations: 27
- Members: 11,172 (2016)
- Official website: http://www.netherlandsreformed.org

The Netherlands Reformed Congregations is a conservative Reformed denomination with congregations in Canada, the United States and Bolivia. It is affiliated with the Reformed Congregations in the Netherlands.

The Netherlands Reformed Congregations aim to remain true to inerrant Scripture (the Bible) and its Calvinist heritage as expounded in the denomination’s doctrinal standards: Belgic Confession, Heidelberg Catechism, and Canons of Dort. They are also in agreement with the Westminster Standards.

== Basic beliefs and doctrines ==
=== Baptism ===
The Netherlands Reformed Congregations hold to infant baptism but believe that although being baptized, each child still carries the personal necessity of being born again by the inward work of the Holy Spirit. Baptism places a child into an external (or outward) relationship to the covenant of grace, just as the Israelites who passed through the Red Sea were outwardly part of God's covenant people. Like the Israelites, baptized children have many of the outward benefits of the children of God. Until they are regenerated by the Holy Spirit, however, they remain outside of the saving benefits of covenant of grace.

=== Bible version ===
The church services are conducted using exclusively the Authorised Version (King James) of the Bible, but personal use of other Bible translations for comparison is permitted. Almost all of the songs sung during the worship service are based on the book of Psalms.

=== Worship and liturgical forms ===
In keeping with the Dutch Calvinist traditions, most of the liturgical forms used are translations of the Dutch forms edited by Petrus Dathenus (1531–1588) and used during Reformation times. Most of the member churches have services two or three times per Sunday. The topic for one service per week is based on one of the 52 Lord's Days from the Heidelberg Catechism. The worship starts with a prayer, followed by singing of a Psalm. In addition to reading a part of the Scripture, the 10 Commandments are read during the Sunday morning service and the Apostles' Creed is read during the Sunday evening service. The pastor or an elder then prays with, and on behalf of the congregation. Following the prayer and the singing of a song adapted from the Psalms, the pastor delivers (preaches) the sermon. After the sermon, there is a closing prayer and more singing from the Psalter. The worship service ends with the pastor pronouncing the prayer for divine blessing from God upon the congregation, usually in the words of Numbers 6:24–26. During worship the congregation remains silent and respectful. Women wear headcoverings in accordance with 1 Corinthians 11. The intention of preaching a topical sermon guided by the Heidelberg Catechism is so that each of the various doctrines taught within Scripture will be covered at least once every year. The Netherlands Reformed Church recognizes two Sacraments: Holy Baptism and Lord's Supper. Children of members are usually baptized in the weeks or months following birth. The Lord's Supper, on the other hand, is usually held about four or five times per year although this may vary among individual churches. Only members who are (1) truly repentant for their sins, (2) have fled to Jesus Christ for salvation, and (3) are purposed from the heart to live in true thankfulness to God, are welcome to participate.

== Creeds and confessions ==
The church subscribes to the Three Forms of Unity, which are as follows:

- Belgic Confession of Faith (1561)
- Heidelberg Catechism (1563)
- Canons of Dort (1618/19)

The church adheres to the five Solae of the Protestant Reformation.

- Scripture alone
- Faith alone
- Grace alone
- Christ alone
- Glory to God alone

== History ==
=== Before emigration to North America ===
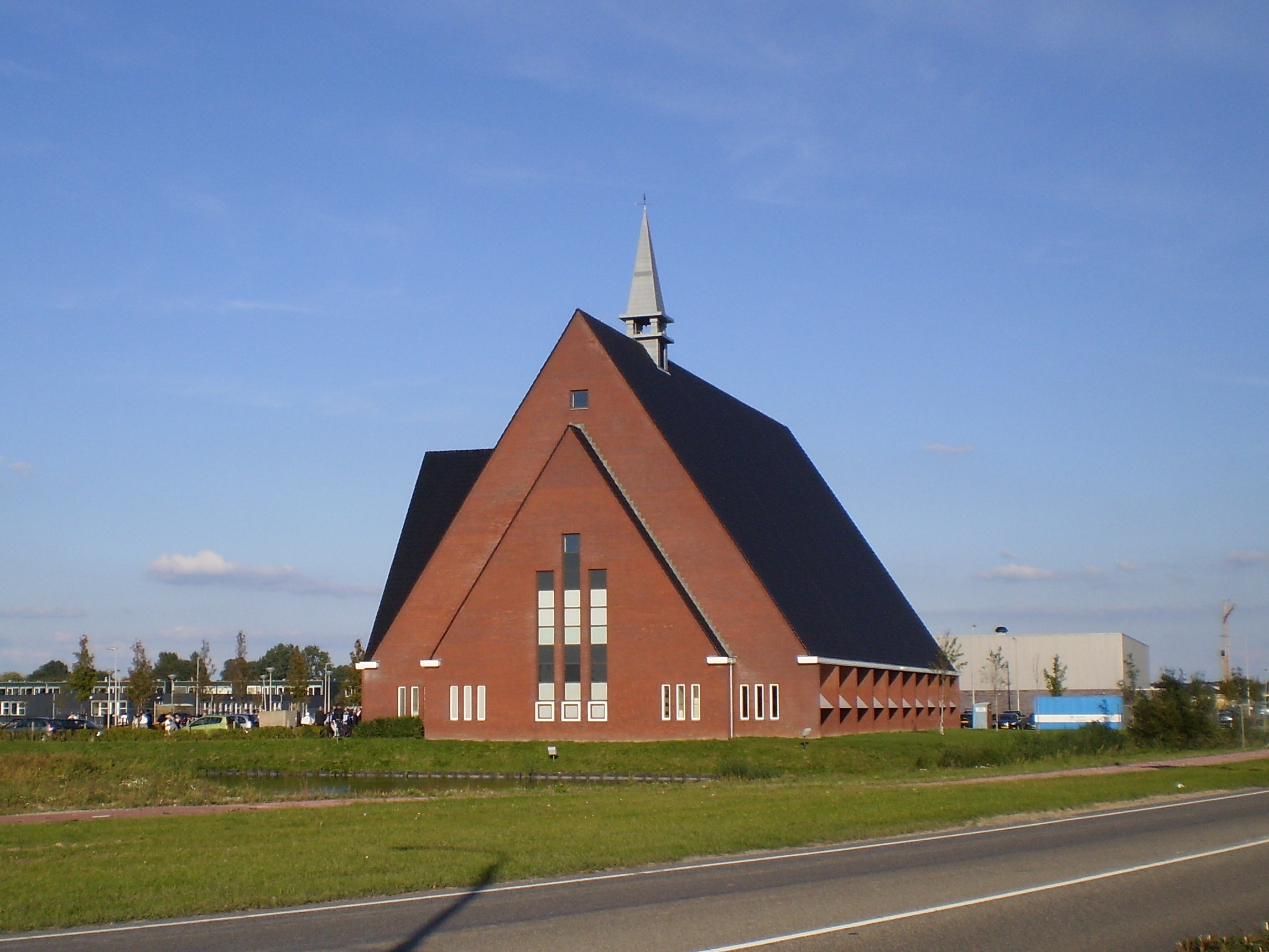
Netherlands Reformed Congregation of Barendrecht

This church originated in the 1834 Dutch Reformed Church split, when a small group in the Netherlands called the Reformed Congregations (Gereformeerde Gemeenten) broke away from the state church.

=== Emigration to North America ===
Distancing themselves from their fellow secessionists of Albertus van Raalte and his associates Cornelius Vander Meulen and Hendrik Scholte due to doctrinal disputes, they led their own emigration first to South Holland, Illinois, in 1865 and then to Grand Rapids, Michigan, in 1870.

=== Post emigration ===
==== 1972 status ====
In 1972, there were fourteen Netherlands Reformed Congregations in the United States, most still conducting their services half in Dutch and half in English, with over five thousand members.

==== 1993 church split ====
In 1993, there was a split in the Netherlands Reformed Congregations, resulting in a new denomination named the Heritage Netherlands Reformed Congregations (renamed the Heritage Reformed Congregations in 2003).

==== Current status ====
In 2001, there were 26 churches and 9,395 members in Canada and the United States. In 2016, the church has 27 congregations and 11,172 members. Currently, there are three Classis. In Bolivia, there are congregations in Rincon, Santa Cruz and Loma Alta.

==== Statistics ====
The NRC consists of these congregations:

List of Netherlands Reformed Congregations
Congregation	Name of the Classis	Membership 2014	Membership 2015	Membership 2016	Pastor
Artesia, California	Far West	22	22	20	vacant
Brant County, Ontario	East	166	195	258	Rev. H. de Leeuw
Calgary, Alberta	Far West	61	61	47	vacant
Chilliwack	Far West	915	937	953	vacant
Choteau, Montana	Far West	24	24	24	vacant
Clifton	East	133	120	131	vacant
Corsica	Mid West	241	235	238	vacant
Fort Macleod, Alberta	Far West	408	431	438	Rev. H.D. den Hollander
Franklin Lakes	East	631	635	611	vacant
Grand Rapids (Beckwith)	Mid West	825	850	859	Rev. H. Hofman Jr.
Grand Rapids (Covell Avenue)	Mid West	222	229	225	vacant
Kalamazoo, Michigan	Mid West	318	308	311	vacant
Lansing	Mid West	33	35	35	vacant
Lethbridge	Far West	1,261	1,291	1,118	vacant
Lynden	Far West	146	149	128	Rev J. Den Hoed
Markham	East	63	59	60	vacant
Nobleford	Far West	0	0	412	Rev. G.M. de Leeuw
Norwich	East	2,106	2,111	2,106	Rev. E. Hakvoort
Picture Butte	Far West	1,103	1,131	965	Rev E.C. Adams
Rock Valley	Mid West	1,492	1,485	1,453	Rev J. Witvoet
Rogersville, Missouri	Mid West	21	23	23	vacant
Sheboygan, Wisconsin	Mid West	81	75	67	vacant
St. Catharines, Ontario	East	182	191	202	Rev. A.H. Verhoef
Sioux Center, Iowa	Mid West	300	313	328	vacant
Sioux Falls	Mid West	53	56	61	vacant
Sunnyside	Far West	69	69	62	vacant
Waupun, Wisconsin	Mid West	93	110	106	vacant
		10,968	11,097	11,172	

==== Recent status ====
The Netherlands Reformed Congregations in North America continue to have close relations with their sister churches (the Reformed Congregations) in the Netherlands. The church services in North America are now mostly conducted in the English language, with some services still in the Dutch language.

== Mission fields ==
The Netherlands Reformed Congregations is involved in mission work in the Loma Alta, Santa Cruz, and Tarija areas of Bolivia.

== Education ==
=== Sunday school and Catechism classes ===
In general the churches hold Sunday School and Catechism classes for the youth of the congregation. These classes may be held after the Sunday morning service.

=== Elementary/high schools ===
Netherlands Reformed Christian Educational Association consists of twelve schools throughout the United States and Canada, with 3,358 students as of the 2016–2017 school year.

== Publications ==
=== Magazines and articles ===
- The Banner of Truth – A monthly publication of the denomination
- Insight Into – The official publication for the youth of the denomination
- Paul – Bimonthly magazine published by the denominational Mission Board
- Learning and Living – The official publication of the Netherlands Reformed Christian Educator's Association

=== Books ===
- Treasured Meditations – Prints and reprints of sermons, tracts, and other spiritual literature

== See also ==
- Reformed Congregations
- Nigeria Reformed Church
- Gereja Jemaat Protestan di Indonesia
- Puritan Reformed Theological Seminary
