= Reformed Congregations in North America =

- Classification: Protestant
- Theology: orthodox Reformed
- Governance: Presbyterian
- Region: Canada, United States
- Origin: 1967; New Jersey
- Separated from: Netherlands Reformed Congregations
- Branched from: Reformed Congregations in the Netherlands
- Congregations: 4
- Members: 1.831 (2015)

The Reformed Congregations in North America form a denomination, Continental Reformed, established in 1967 in the United States and Canada, by dissidents from Netherlands Reformed Congregations.

The denomination has official ties with the Reformed Congregations in the Netherlands, and the churches are mainly in Canada. It has approximately 1747 members, three churches in Canada and one in the United States in 2012. The theology focus is mainly on the time of the Further reformation and subscribes to the Three Forms of Unity: The Heidelberg Catechism, The Belgic Confession of Faith, and the Canons of Dordt. The largest church is the congregation of Chilliwack with over 1,200 members.

== History ==
After the § Schism in 1953 in the Reformed Congregations, two congregations were formed in the United States, mostly by people who broke away from the Netherlands Reformed Congregations (the North American counterpart to the Reformed Congregations).

In Canada the Lethbridge and Chilliwack congregations decided to cooperate. In 1967 the Chilliwack Congregation decided in its meeting to cooperate and join forces with the Reformed Congregations in the Netherlands. On June 28, 1968 the first classis meeting was held in Lethbridge, Alberta.

The Chilliwack Reformed Congregation's building was dedicated in 1969, it was several times enlarged and extended, recently in 2004 from 800 to 1,200 seats. In late 2022, Rev. Otto M. Van der Tang was installed as minister.

The Lethbridge Congregation built a new building in 2008 with 325 seats.

In 2019 the fifth church of the denomination was opened in Giroux (Manitoba).

== Churches ==
Congregation	Members 2012	Members 2013	Members 2014	Members 2015	Minister
Chilliwack, British Columbia	1174	1209	1251	1274	Rev. Otto M. Van der Tang
Monarch, Alberta	204	215	212	211	vacant
Newark/Norwich, Ontario	300	302	314	325	vacant
Prospect Park, New Jersey	21	21	21	21	vacant

Giroux, manitoba

== See also ==
- Gereformeerde Gemeenten in Nederland
