= Free Presbyterian Church (Australia) =

Free Presbyterian Church of Australia
- Classification: Protestant
- Orientation: Reformed
- Polity: Presbyterian
- Origin: 1978; Port Lincoln, Australia
- Congregations: 4

The Free Presbyterian Church of Australia is a denomination which currently consists of four congregations in fellowship with the Free Presbyterian Church of Ulster. There are congregations in Port Lincoln, Perth, Lock and Kingston, Tasmania.

== History ==
The Free Presbyterian Church of Australia began in Port Lincoln under the ministry of Rev. Fred Buick on 1 January 1978 in the home of a Mrs. Elizabeth Feltus. Under the ministry of Rev. Buick and the subsequent lengthy ministry of Rev. Michael Patrick the church progressed and a permanent church building for the congregation was found and purchased.

Another worship service was added, a weekly bible study and prayer meeting was established, and a Friday night youth work. In time the work extended northward to the small bush town of Lock, to Perth in Western Australia and to Tasmania.

== Doctrine ==
The church is Presbyterian in doctrine and government, though it departs from the usual Presbyterian policy by recognising that baptism is variously understood by others equally committed to Scripture. It is Protestant in its faith, identifying with the Protestant Reformation. In theology the church is reformed. It sees itself standing in the tradition of John Calvin, John Knox, the Puritans and many revival preachers. The church is evangelistic, seeking to “preach the gospel to every creature”. Emphasis is placed upon the necessity of prayer in the life of the individual and church. Rowland Ward and Robert Humphreys suggest that "the doctrinal position is the Westminster Confession of Faith, but there are some concessions to baptist thinking in that the mode and subjects of baptism are left open questions." Ward and Humphreys go on to note that "the pre-millennial view and the historicist interpretation of prophecy are standard. The King James Bible is exclusively used and recommended." The Book of Church Order for the Free Presbyterian Church of North America (a sister denomination) commenting on Free Presbyterianism in general, notes that “on the issues as to whether the second coming of Christ will be pre-, post-, or a-millennial and whether, if it is premillennial, it will be pre-, mid-, or post- tribulational, there is liberty of opinion. This liberty does not extend to peculiar views of prophecy that weaken or contradict the exposition of the plan of salvation set forth in our confession and catechisms.”

== See also ==
- List of Presbyterian and Reformed denominations in Australia
