= De Hoeksteen, Barneveld =

Church in Barneveld, Netherlands

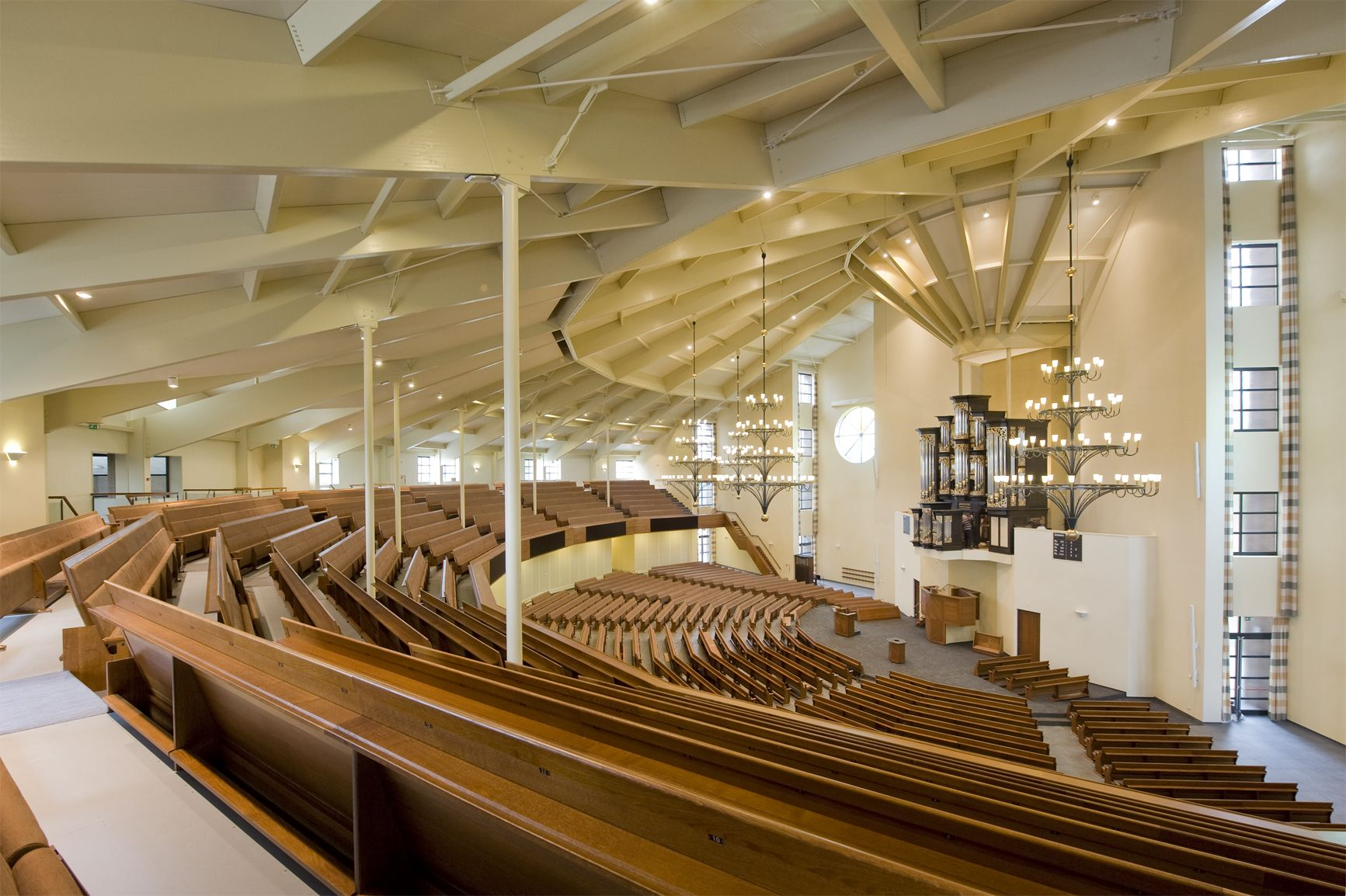
- Interior of The Hoeksteen

Religion
- Affiliation: Reformed Congregations in the Netherlands
- Leadership: ds. J. Roos

Location
- Location: Netherlands
- Interactive map of De Hoeksteen, Barneveld
- Coordinates: 52°8′0″N 5°35′0″E

Architecture
- Architects: Van Beijnum, Amerongen
- Groundbreaking: 2007
- Completed: 2008
- Capacity: 2,531

De Hoeksteen (The Cornerstone) in Barneveld, the Netherlands, is the second largest church building in the Netherlands. It is used by the congregation of the Gereformeerde Gemeenten in Nederland, a highly conservative denomination. The church services are conducted using exclusively the Statenvertaling (Dutch for States Translation) of the Bible.

== Construction of the church ==
Plans for building a new church were first considered in 2005. The construction began in 2007 and took 18 months. The new 2,531–seat church was opened in 2008. The church tower is 37.75 meters high.
