= Rinus Terlouw =

Dutch association football player

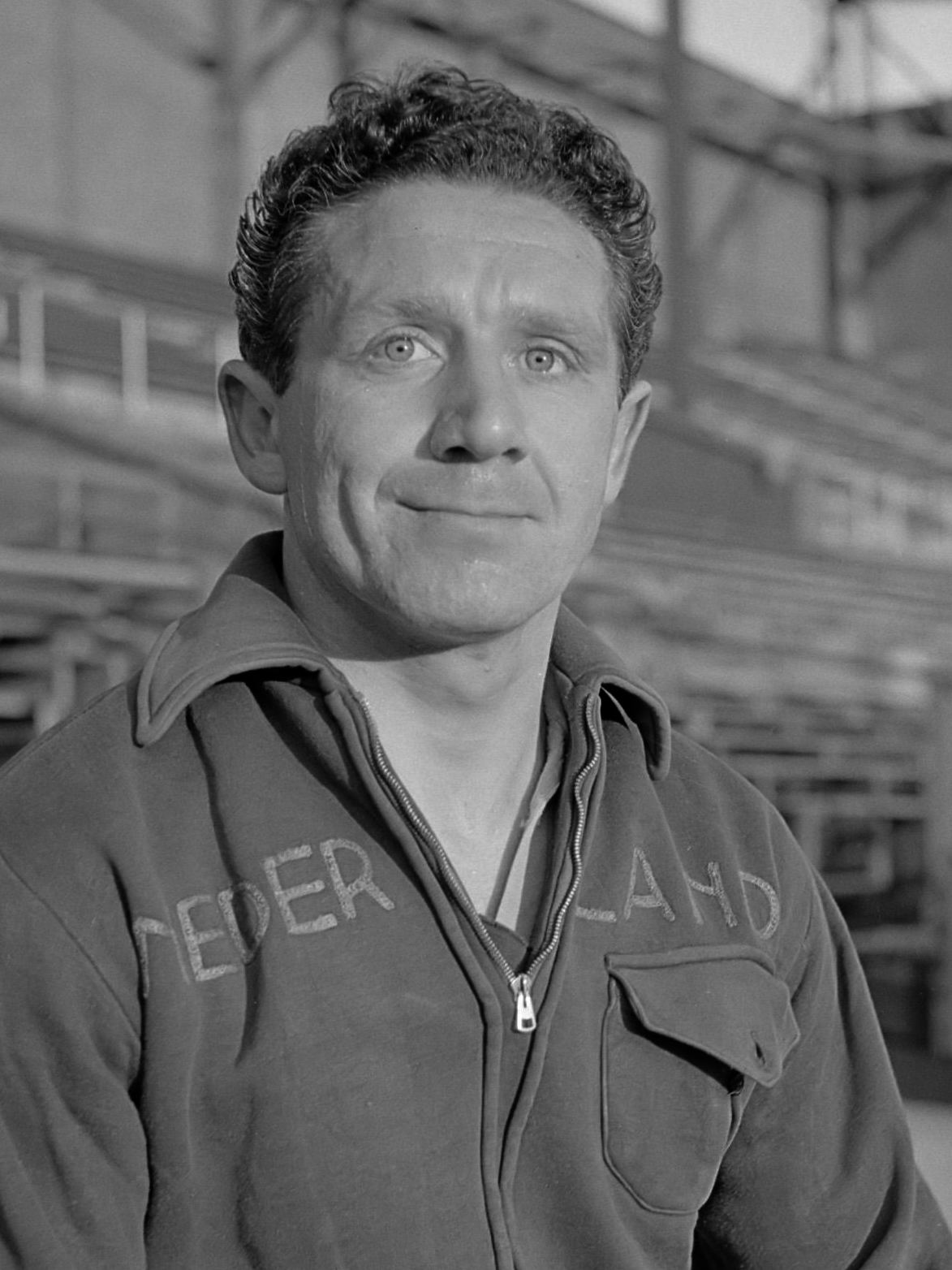
- Rinus Terlouw in 1951

Personal information
- Full name: Marinus Terlouw
- Date of birth: 16 June 1922
- Place of birth: Capelle aan den IJssel, Netherlands
- Date of death: 17 December 1992 (aged 70)
- Place of death: Capelle aan den IJssel, Netherlands
- Position: Defender

Senior career*
Years	Team	Apps	(Gls)
1939–1945	CVV Zwervers		
1945–1948	DCV Krimpen		
1948–1958	Sparta	248	(?)

International career
1948–1954	Netherlands	34	(0)
- * Club domestic league appearances and goals

Marinus "Rinus" Terlouw (16 June 1922 – 17 December 1992), also known as "De Rots" ("The Rock"), was a Dutch footballer. He competed at the 1948 Summer Olympics and the 1952 Summer Olympics.

== Career ==
In his youth he played for CVV Zwervers in his hometown of Capelle aan den IJssel, where he first appeared in the first team at age 17. Afterwards, he played for DCV from Krimpen aan den IJssel, before finally moving to Sparta in 1948, where he ended him making 248 appearances. In addition, he gained 34 caps for the Netherlands national team. In 1958, he retired as a footballer and subsequently returned to DCV as a manager.

Famous is the kiss he received on 13 October 1957 from American actress Jayne Mansfield before the match at Het Kasteel between Sparta and VV DOS. The film star was invited to perform the kick-off. The players of the Rotterdam club were reportedly so impressed by the sultry kiss on Terlouw's mouth that Sparta lost 1–7.

In the summer of 1965, he abruptly put an end to his activities in football. He dedicated the rest of his life to the Reformed Congregations in the Netherlands, severing all contact with the sports world and sending back the distinctions related to his achievements in football to the Royal Dutch Football Association (KNVB). He since became a deacon of this church.

Terlouw died on 17 December 1992 at the age of 70, succumbing to Alzheimer's disease.

== Honours ==
Sparta

- KNVB Cup: 1957–58
