= Evangelical Presbyterian Church (Australia) =

- Classification: Protestant
- Orientation: Calvinism
- Polity: Presbyterian
- Origin: 29 September 1961; Launceston
- Separations: 1986 Southern Presbyterian Church
- Congregations: 5
- Members: approx. 250

The Evangelical Presbyterian Church is a small Australian Reformed Christian denomination. In September 2010 it had five centres: Brisbane; Londonderry (Sydney); Cohuna, Victoria (preaching station); Launceston and Winnaleah (Tasmania) with until 2014 a small school at Herrick near Winnaleah.

The EPC was constituted in Launceston, Tasmania, on 29 September 1961 with a doctrinal basis identical to the Presbyterian Church of Eastern Australia, three of whose ministers formed a special presbytery for the purpose of ordaining the first three ministers. Its first ministers were the Reverend Charles Rodman, Eric Turnbull and Hugh McNeilly.

The denomination was originally called the Reformed Evangelical Church but in 1966 changed its name because according to the church's official history "it was found that Australian society was not familiar with the term 'reformed' in its historical and church connection. Many associated the word with reform or correctional schools for example."

The creation of the EPC was part of a revival in Reformed and Calvinist theology among Australian evangelical Christians from the 1950s.

== Faith and practice ==
The EPC professes adherence to the Westminster Standards, but rejects common grace and the concept of God having unfulfilled desires for the salvation of the reprobate. That is, the EPC denies that God has any attitude of love or favour to the non-elect in the free offer of the gospel.

The EPC is also committed to the biblically regulated worship set forth in Westminster Confession of Faith and exemplified in the Directory of Public Worship. This is interpreted to maintain exclusive psalmody and exclude musical instruments in worship.

The EPC's witness has included political action on moral issues such as making submissions to government on observing the Christian Sabbath and gambling and protesting against what it sees as anti-Christian activities, such as the rock opera, Jesus Christ, Superstar. It supports Bible translation through the Chinese Translation Society (formerly the Reformation Translation Fellowship), and Christian missions in places such as Uganda and the Middle East. Family and young people's camps and studies have been regularly held in Australia.

== Relationships with other denominations ==
The EPC was formed because its members believed the large mainstream denominations from which they had come, including the Baptist, Presbyterian and Methodist churches in Australia, had departed from fundamental Christian truths and contained too much spiritual compromise. Instead they embraced the Reformed faith although its inclusion of infant baptism was problematic for some and at Easter 1961 the Reverend J L Lincolne, former principal of the WEC International College in Launceston left the fellowship and established a new college and congregation based on the 1689 Baptist Confession of Faith.

Early encouragement from the Presbyterian Church of Eastern Australia (popularly known as "the Free Church") was significant in shaping the emerging EPC community. After contemplating joining, the leaders did not proceed with an actual union but there was a desire to continue a fruitful ecumenical relationship with it and other reformed churches. However the largely Anglo EPC saw too many doctrinal, worship style, lifestyle and cultural differences to work closely with the Reformed Church of Australia populated as it was largely by Post-war migrants from the Netherlands.

The PCEA contributed to the training of EPC ministers through the John Knox Theological College operated 1963–65 out of the East St Kilda PCEA, but by 1964 the EPC was in significant conflict with the PCEA over the free offer of the gospel, as presented by Professor John Murray and Ned Stonehouse in their booklet on the subject. Some of the EPC congregations split with some members from Penguin joining the PCEA in 1965 with their minister Eric Turnbull. (Turnbull was removed from the PCEA ministry in 1979 because of his teaching that the King James Bible was the pure word of God over against other translations, and subsequently formed the Australian Free Church.) Some from Winnaleah joined the PCEA in 1971 after some years independent but returned in 1979. Controversy with the EPC was evident for a number of years. Some considered that the EPC were reacting in a rationalistic way from their previous free will (Arminian) theology, and that they preached the Bible according to the doctrine rather than the doctrine to the Bible. Two ministers withdrew to form the Southern Presbyterian Church in 1986. In 1991 the Covenant Presbyterian Church in Sydney, which had resulted from a schism from the PCEA Western Sydney in 1981, was received into the EPC. In September 2002 the Rockhampton congregation and its minister withdrew to become Grace Presbyterian Church which united in 2009 with the Australian Free Church.

In 2008 the EPC apologised to the PCEA Synod for the hurt caused by accusation of schismatic conduct by the PCEA in 1965 concerning the reception of the Penguin (now Ulverstone) congregation. Relationships in Tasmania have significantly improved.

EPC ministers train at the Seminary of the Protestant Reformed Churches in Michigan USA. While there are differences on some matters with the Protestant Reformed Churches the two denominations agree on the rejection of common grace.

=== Reconciliation with Southern Presbyterian Church ===
In March 2019, a joint meeting with officer bearers of the EPC and the SPC sought to repair damaged relations between the two denominations due to the historic split from decades before. The statement said in part:

We of the EPCA and SPCA, as we consider our two histories as churches, acknowledge before the Lord Jesus, the Head of the Church, that while there were honourable principles and legitimate concerns involved, and while there was a desire on both sides for the good of Christ Jesus’ cause, there was also sin committed by all those involved in the events which led to a separation and alienation of brethren a generation ago.Together we acknowledge that those sad events of yesteryear have harmed the name and cause of Christ Jesus and have hurt and caused to stumble various of His children.

...

We therefore, in the spirit of Christian and brotherly love, jointly publish this statement, and extend the right hand of fellowship to one another, seeking to offer mutual respect and care, and to work together as able, to honour and uphold Christ in our two churches and our future relationship

== See also ==
- List of Presbyterian and Reformed denominations in Australia
- Presbyterian polity
