= Old-Reformed Congregations (unconnected) =

The Old-Reformed Congregations (unconnected) was founded by Rev. Van der Meer, who separated from the Old-Reformed Congregations in the Netherlands in 2007. In October 2007 Rev. Van der Meer and some members in the congregation in Sint Philipsland separated from the Old-Reformed Congregations, and later the denomination suspended him and cancelled his membership.

After the termination of his membership he founded the new denomination. Later in 2008 the Bolnes Old-Reformed Church and later the congregation in Ridderkerk joined the new denomination. The latter two congregations have been disestablished which means Sint Philipsland is the only congregation in the denomination. It has formed official links with the Reformed Congregations in the Netherlands (unconnected). Van der Meer preaches not only in the congregations in St. Philip country and Bolnes but also in Dinteloord and Veenendaal.
