= Thomas Ford (minister) =

English nonconformist minister

Thomas Ford (1598–1674) was an English nonconformist minister, a member of the Westminster Assembly and ejected minister of 1662.

== Life ==
He was born at Brixton, Devon. In 1619 he entered Magdalen Hall, Oxford, graduating B.A. on 22 February 1624, and M.A. 1 June 1627. Taking orders, he became tutor in his hall for several years. His opinions were those of a Puritan, and were openly held; they attracted the attention of Archbishop William Laud.

He preached at Parliament, once before the House of Commons, on 30 July 1645, and once before the House of Lords, on April 1646.

=== Expulsion from post at University of Oxford ===
In 1621, Mr Accepted Frewen, then president of Magdalen College, Oxford, relocated the communion-table in the college chapel, making it into an altar according to Puritan views. Several of the preachers at St Mary's Church spoke out against this innovation. On 12 June 1621, Ford preached on 2 Thess. ii. 10, and offered some reflections on the Eucharist.

This plain speaking offended the Laudian party, and the next Saturday the vice-chancellor William Smyth called Ford before him and demanded a copy of his sermon. Ford offered to give him one if he demanded it ‘statutably.’ The vice-chancellor then ordered him to surrender himself prisoner at the castle. He refused to go unless accompanied by a beadle or a servant. The following Saturday the vice-chancellor sealed up his study, and afterwards searched his books and papers, but found nothing that could be urged against him. In the meantime an information was sent to Laud, then chancellor of the university, who returned orders to punish the preachers. Thereupon a citation in his name was fixed on St. Mary's, 2 July, commanding Ford's appearance before the vice-chancellor on the 5th. Appearing on the day appointed he was pressed to take an oath, ex officio, to answer any questions about his sermon; but he refused it, because there were no interrogatories in writing. He again offered a copy of his sermon if demanded according to the statutes, and the next day delivered one, which was accepted.

However, on pretence of former contumacy the vice-chancellor commanded him again to surrender himself prisoner. Ford appealed from him to the congregation, and delivered his appeal in writing to the proctors (Atherton Bruch and John Doughty). They carried it to convocation, who referred the cause to delegates, a majority of whom, upon a full hearing, acquitted him of all breach of the peace. From them the vice-chancellor himself appealed to convocation, who again appointed delegates; but the time limited by statute expired before they could arrive at a decision. Laud then brought the cause before the king and council, who heard it at Woodstock 23 August. Ford, when questioned by the king, stuck to his statement. In the end he was sentenced to quit the university within four days. Many of the scholars in their gowns, assembled at Magdalen to conduct him out of the city.

=== Exile abroad ===
Soon afterwards the magistrates of Plymouth, New England, invited Ford to become their lecturer. Laud procured letters from the king forbidding the townsmen to elect Ford on pain of his majesty's displeasure, and another to the Bishop of Exeter, commanding him not to admit him in case he should be elected. Ford eventually went to Germany as chaplain to an English regiment under the command of Colonel George Fleetwood, in the service of Gustavus Adolphus and he spent some time in garrison at Stode and Elbing. The English merchants at Hamburg invited him to be their minister, but he declined this offer.

=== Return to England ===
He returned to England in late 1637 and served at the rectory of Aldwinkle All Saints, Northamptonshire.

In 1640 he was elected proctor for the clergy of the diocese of Peterborough in the convocation which framed the so-called et cetera oath; he stayed there for ten years, until the outbreak of the First English Civil War. He then moved to London, and was chosen minister of St Faith under St Paul's, and in 1644, on the death of Oliver Bowles, a member of the Westminster Assembly. Ford afterwards settled at Exeter, where he exercised an evangelical ministry and he preached in the choir of Exeter Cathedral.

=== Later expulsions and reinstatements ===
The historian Edmund Calamy notes that in 1649, Major-general John Desborough, who quartered there, expelled Ford for refusing the engagement.

He was appointed minister of St. Lawrence, Exeter, and also acted as an assistant-commissioner for Devon.

The enforcement of the Act of Uniformity 1662 obliged him to desist from preaching publicly. A year later he was compelled by the Oxford Act to move to Exmouth, about nine miles from Exeter, where he lived very privately.

When the Declaration of Indulgence came out he returned to Exeter, but in feeble health. He died in December 1674, in his seventy-sixth year, and was buried on the 28th in St. Lawrence's Church, Exeter.

== Family ==
He was married to Bridget Fleetwood, and they had several children.

== Works ==
His writings are as follows:

- Singing of Psalmes the duty of Christians under the New Testament, or a vindication of that Gospel-Ordinance in V sermons upon Ephesians v. 19, London, 1652
- The Sinner condemned of himself: being a Plea for God against all the Ungodly, proving them alone guilty of their own destruction, London, 1668
- Scripture's Self-Evidence, proving it to be the only Rule of Faith
- The Christian’s Duty Towards Reformation
