= Old-Reformed Congregations in the Netherlands =

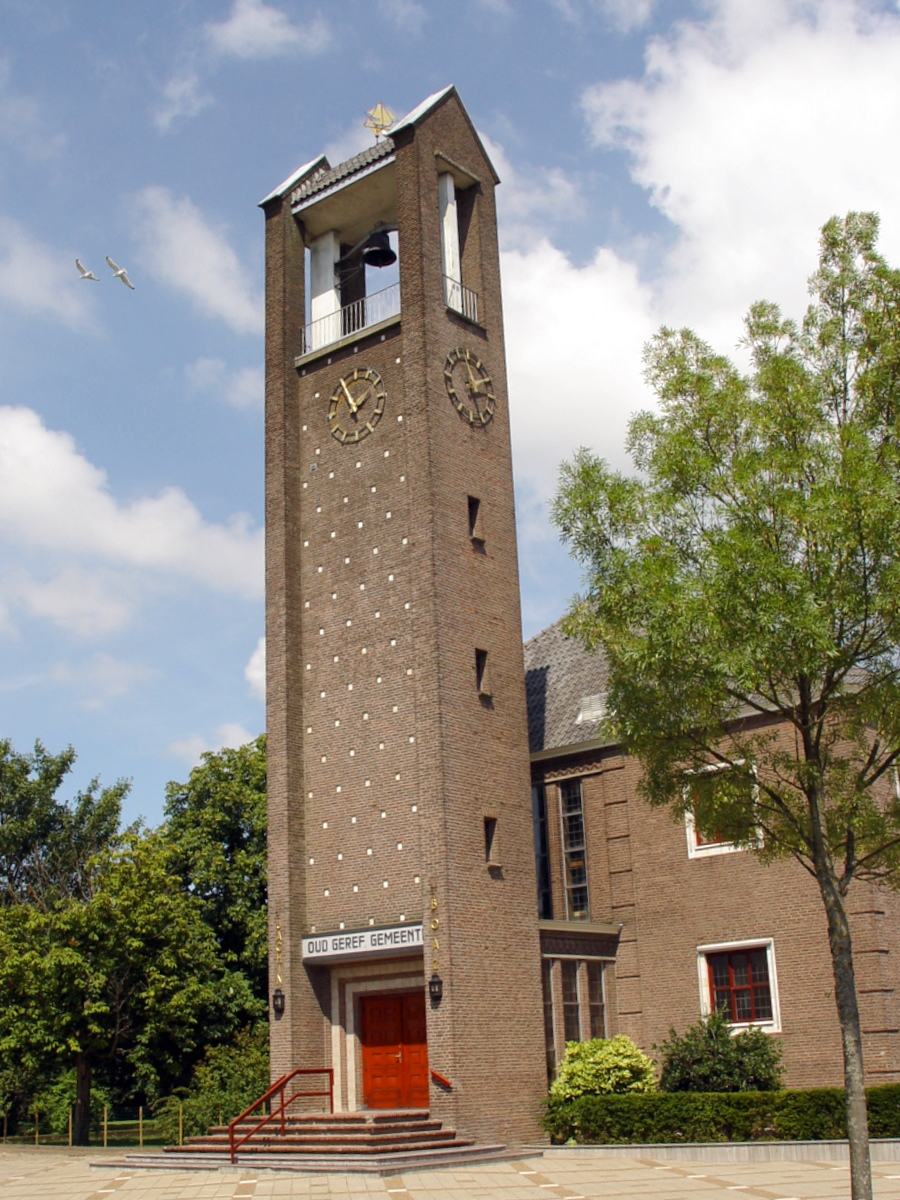
- Old Reformed Church in Urk
- Classification: Protestant
- Orientation: conservative Calvinist
- Theology: Reformed
- Polity: Presbyterian
- Region: The Netherlands
- Founder: Pastor Boone
- Origin: 1948; Netherlands
- Congregations: 57 plus three mission stations in the Netherlands
- Members: 18,000 (2005)

The Old-Reformed Congregations in the Netherlands (Dutch: Oud Gereformeerde Gemeenten in Nederland) is a pietistic Reformed denomination in the Netherlands.

== Characteristics ==
The characteristics of the denomination are the loose structure compared to other churches, and less dogmatic rigidity. In recent years, the denomination has worked closely with the Free Presbyterian Church of Scotland.

== Statistics ==
The federation has 62 congregations and three departments in the Netherlands and one congregation located in Salford, Canada. Membership is approximately 18,000 baptized members. The largest congregations are in Urk, Barneveld, Geldermalsen, Kinderdijk, Krimpen aan den IJssel, Rijssen, Stavenisse. According to the Los Angeles Times, the federation is growing by 50 members annually.

Full list of all churches of the Old-Reformed Congregations in the Netherlands:

List of churches of the Old-Reformed Congregations in the Netherlands
Congregation	Place	Membership	Pastor
Old-Reformed Congregations in the Netherlands	Achterberg	300	vacant
Old-Reformed Congregations in the Netherlands	Alphen aan den Rijn	150	vacant
Old-Reformed Congregations in the Netherlands	Amersfoort	100	vacant
Old-Reformed Congregations in the Netherlands	Barneveld	1025	dhr. R. Bakker (als lerend ouderling)
Old-Reformed Congregations in the Netherlands	Lieren (Beekbergen)	150	vacant
Old-Reformed Congregations in the Netherlands	Benthuizen	375	ds. P. van Veen
Old-Reformed Congregations in the Netherlands	Bergambacht	160	vacant
Old-Reformed Congregations in the Netherlands	Bunschoten	50	vacant
Old-Reformed Congregations in the Netherlands	Capelle aan den IJssel	50	vacant
Old-Reformed Congregations in the Netherlands	Doorn	200	vacant
Old-Reformed Congregations in the Netherlands	Dordrecht	350	vacant
Old-Reformed Congregations in the Netherlands	Echteld-Waalbandijk, nabij Ochten	175	vacant
Old-Reformed Congregations in the Netherlands	Ede-Spoorstraat	100	vacant
Old-Reformed Congregations in the Netherlands	Ederveen	150	vacant
Old-Reformed Congregations in the Netherlands	Elspeet	85	vacant
Old-Reformed Congregations in the Netherlands	Elst	140	vacant
Old-Reformed Congregations in the Netherlands	Ermelo	180	vacant
Old-Reformed Congregations in the Netherlands	Geldermalsen	900	vacant
Old-Reformed Congregations in the Netherlands	Gouderak	100	vacant
Old-Reformed Congregations in the Netherlands	Grafhorst	450	vacant
Old-Reformed Congregations in the Netherlands	Grand Rapids, United States	20	ds. G. Gerritsen
Old-Reformed Congregations in the Netherlands	's-Gravendeel	175	vacant
Old-Reformed Congregations in the Netherlands	's-Gravenpolder	250	vacant
Old-Reformed Congregations in the Netherlands	Hardinxveld-Giessendam	725	vacant
Old-Reformed Congregations in the Netherlands	Kampen	200	vacant
Old-Reformed Congregations in the Netherlands	Kinderdijk	850	vacant
Old-Reformed Congregations in the Netherlands	Klundert	20	vacant
Old-Reformed Congregations in the Netherlands	Krimpen aan den IJssel	1900	ds. A. Kort
Old-Reformed Congregations in the Netherlands	Leersum	325	vacant
Old-Reformed Congregations in the Netherlands	Lienden	145	vacant
Old-Reformed Congregations in the Netherlands	Lisse	100	vacant
Old-Reformed Congregations in the Netherlands	Loenen aan de Vecht	100	vacant
Old-Reformed Congregations in the Netherlands	Monster	75	vacant
Old-Reformed Congregations in the Netherlands	Langbroek	275	vacant
Old-Reformed Congregations in the Netherlands	Nieuw-Beijerland	125	vacant
Old-Reformed Congregations in the Netherlands	Oldebroek	70	vacant
Old-Reformed Congregations in the Netherlands	Oostburg	100	vacant
Old-Reformed Congregations in the Netherlands	Oosterland	450	vacant
Old-Reformed Congregations in the Netherlands	Oud-Beijerland	120	vacant
Old-Reformed Congregations in the Netherlands	Overberg	125	vacant
Old-Reformed Congregations in the Netherlands	Papendrecht	50	vacant
Old-Reformed Congregations in the Netherlands	Rhenen	125	vacant
Old-Reformed Congregations in the Netherlands	Rijssen	400	vacant
Old-Reformed Congregations in the Netherlands	Rouveen	550	ds. H. Romkes
Old-Reformed Congregations in the Netherlands	Salford (Ontario)	150	vacant
Old-Reformed Congregations in the Netherlands	Scheveningen	75	vacant
Old-Reformed Congregations in the Netherlands	Sint Philipsland	1050	vacant
Old-Reformed Congregations in the Netherlands	Sliedrecht	175	vacant
Old-Reformed Congregations in the Netherlands	Sint-Maartensdijk	100	vacant
Old-Reformed Congregations in the Netherlands	Stavenisse	850	vacant
Old-Reformed Congregations in the Netherlands	Urk	1300	ds. Th.L. Zwartbol
Old-Reformed Congregations in the Netherlands	Utrecht	100	dhr. A.F.R. van der Veen
Old-Reformed Congregations in the Netherlands	Veenwouden	70	vacant
Old-Reformed Congregations in the Netherlands	Waddinxveen	200	vacant
Old-Reformed Congregations in the Netherlands	Wekerom	650	vacant
Old-Reformed Congregations in the Netherlands	Werkendam	150	vacant
Old-Reformed Congregations in the Netherlands	Woudenberg	375	vacant
Old-Reformed Congregations in the Netherlands	Zierikzee	75	vacant
Old-Reformed Congregations in the Netherlands	Zoetermeer	80	vacant
Total		17.845	

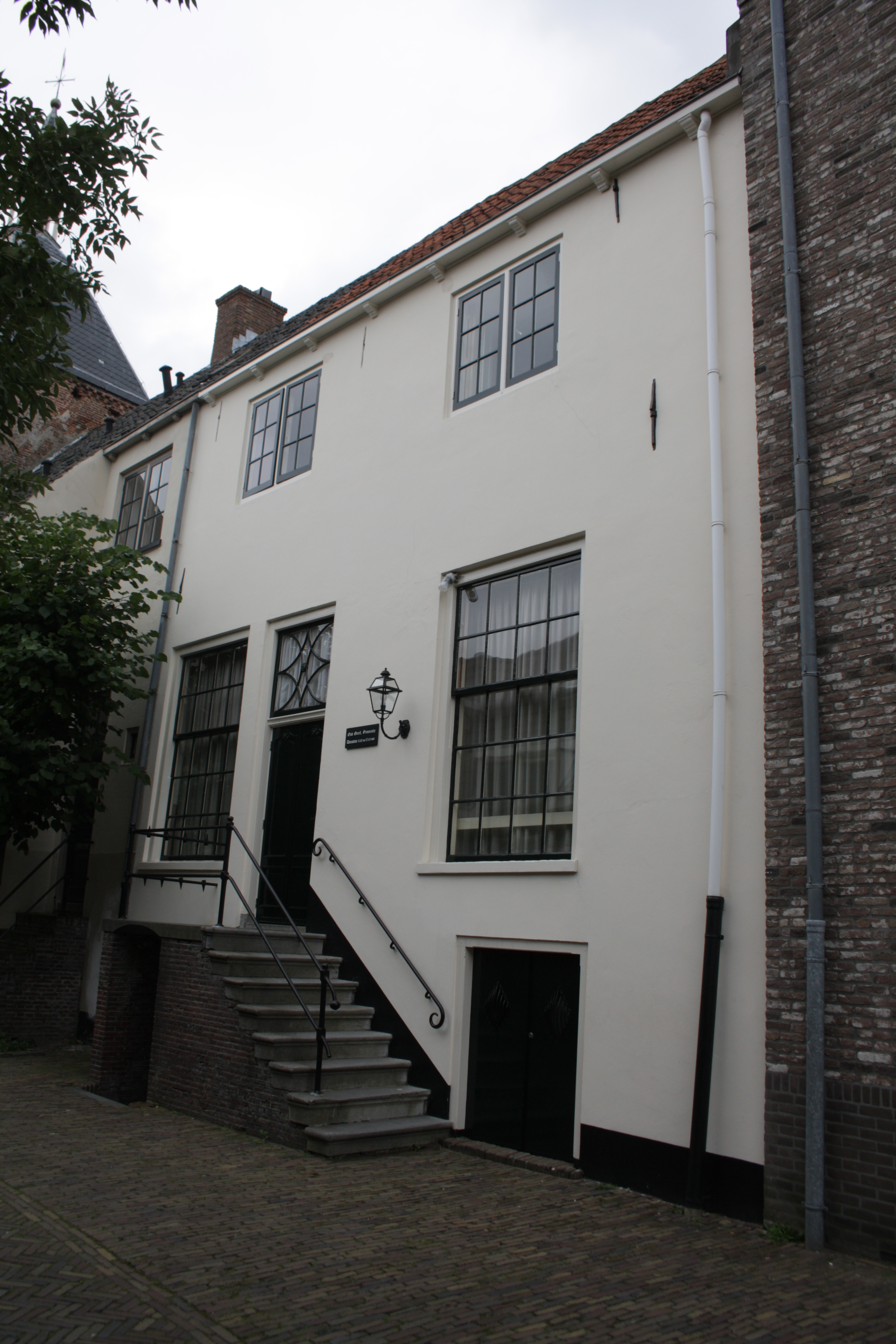
Amersfoort Old Reformed Congregation

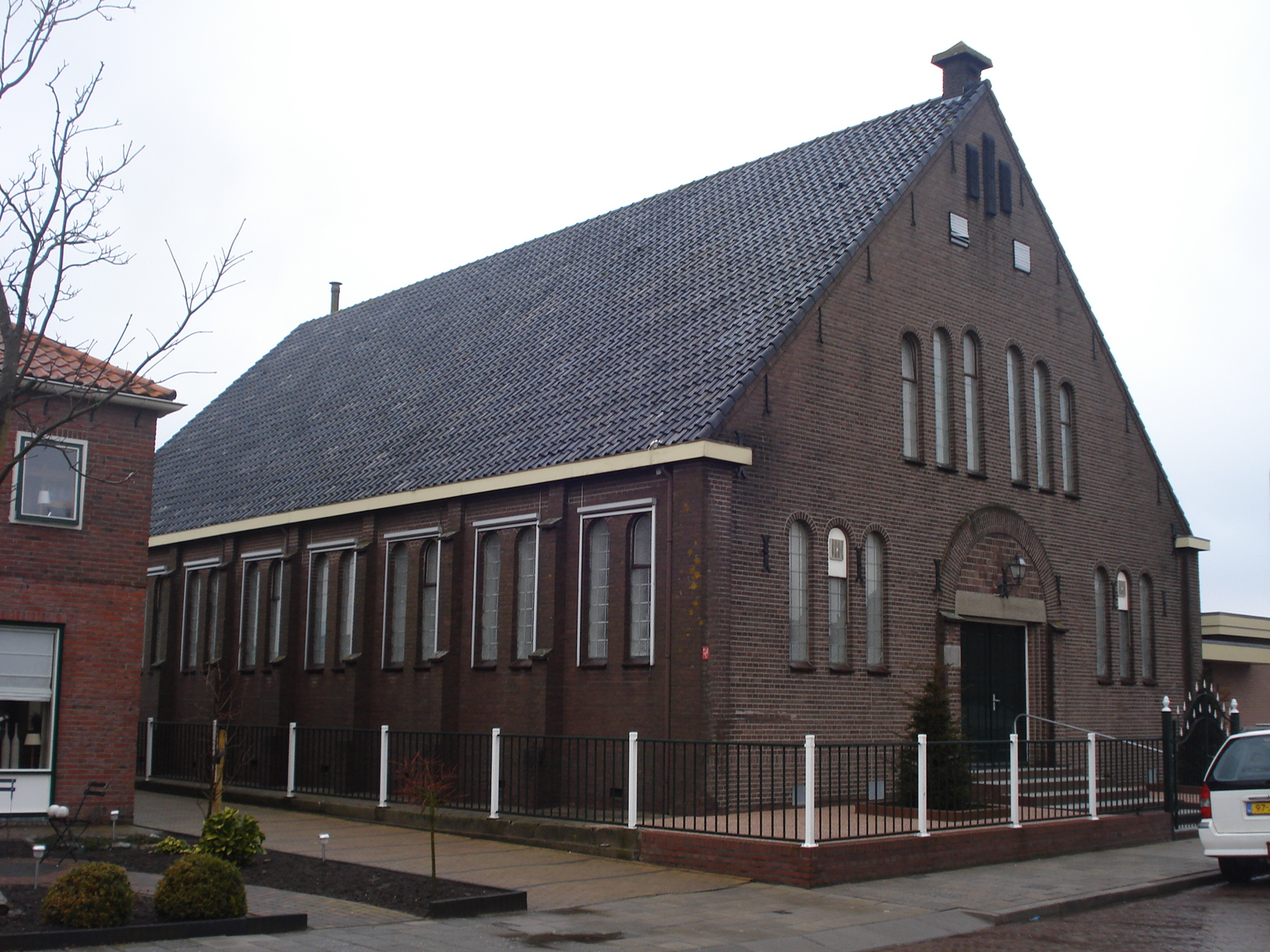
Stavenisse Old Reformed Congregation

== History ==
The federation was created in 1948 by the union of the Old Reformed Churches (Boone municipalities) and the Federation of Old Reformed Congregations. The Old Reformed Church was founded in 1907 with Pastor Boone as leader. The Federation of Old Reformed Churches was a small denomination founded in 1912. In 1952 a few Christian Reformed Churches also joined the. It has a theological seminary. In missions the Old-Reformed Church collaborates with the Free Presbyterian Church of Scotland.

=== Growth ===
The church experienced growth during the 1950 and the 1960s, mainly because the free congregations joined the Old-Reformed Congregations. The number of the 48 congregations that formed the federation increased to over 60. A few Christian Reformed Churches in the Netherlands parishes joined in Leersum, Thorn and Dortrecht.

== Doctrine ==
The denomination adheres to the Three Forms of Unity of the Reformed faith: the Belgic Confession, the Canons of Dort, and the Heidelberg Catechism.

=== Social issues ===
The church is against the use of television and movies. Homosexuality, abortion, euthanasia and contraception are regarded as sinful. The children of the members must go to reformed schools. The women must wear long skirts and headcoverings in worship services.

== Separations ==
In 2007 the Old-Reformed Congregations (unconnected) was formed.
