= Southern Presbyterian Church (Australia) =

- Classification: Protestant
- Orientation: Calvinism
- Origin: 1986
- Separated from: Evangelical Presbyterian Church
- Congregations: 2

The Southern Presbyterian Church is a small denomination with a community of about 130 persons located exclusively in Tasmania, Australia. It formed in 1986 when two ministers (one of whom died a few months later) and a number of members left the Evangelical Presbyterian Church because of a difference of belief over doctrinal issues.

As of 2021, the Southern Presbyterian Church had two congregations: one in Glenorchy and one in Launceston. Public worship is conducted with Scripture reading, preaching, prayer, and the unaccompanied singing of Psalms. The Southern Presbyterian Church uses the King James Version of the Bible in public worship. Its supreme standard is the Bible according to the Received Text, but they, according to Ward and Humphreys, "in other respects are close to the PCEA in orientation" with whom it is exploring closer relations.

== Reconciliation with Evangelical Presbyterian Church ==
In March 2019, a joint meeting with officer bearers of the EPC and the SPC sought to repair damaged relations between the two denominations due to the historic split from decades before. The statement said in part:

We of the EPCA and SPCA, as we consider our two histories as churches, acknowledge before the Lord Jesus, the Head of the Church, that while there were honourable principles and legitimate concerns involved, and while there was a desire on both sides for the good of Christ Jesus’ cause, there was also sin committed by all those involved in the events which led to a separation and alienation of brethren a generation ago.Together we acknowledge that those sad events of yesteryear have harmed the name and cause of Christ Jesus and have hurt and caused to stumble various of His children.

...

We therefore, in the spirit of Christian and brotherly love, jointly publish this statement, and extend the right hand of fellowship to one another, seeking to offer mutual respect and care, and to work together as able, to honour and uphold Christ in our two churches and our future relationship

== See also ==
- List of Presbyterian and Reformed denominations in Australia
