= Australian Free Church =

- Classification: Protestant
- Orientation: Calvinism
- Polity: Presbyterian
- Origin: 1979; Chadstone, Victoria
- Separated from: Presbyterian Church of Eastern Australia
- Congregations: 2
- Members: about 15

Australian Free Church is a Presbyterian denomination in Australia.

== History ==
The Australian Free Church was established in 1979 when Eric Turnbull (1928–2013) was removed from being a minister of the Presbyterian Church of Eastern Australia. According to Rowland Ward and Robert Humphreys, this was for "refusing to desist from teaching that the King James Bible is the very Word of God to the exclusion of other translations," such as the NIV or NASB, although the church's website states that it was formed "out of a desire to maintain the standards of doctrine, worship and church government held by our Scottish spiritual forebears." The church website also states they "use the Authorised Version (KJV) as the most faithful English translation."

Turnbull was the minister at East St Kilda and took the more active part of the congregation with him. After several moves a church building was purchased in Chadstone in 1988. A number of people in Hamilton also adhered to the Australian Free Church. In 1994 the Australian Free Church applied to join the Free Presbyterian Church of Scotland but their application was declined. They have fraternal relations with the Free Church of Scotland (Continuing). The first Presbytery of the Australian Free Church was constituted in 2002.

== Statistics ==
There are currently congregations in Chadstone, Beaufort and Hamilton. The Rockhampton congregation was received in 2009 and had previously been a congregation of the Evangelical Presbyterian Church that had withdrawn from that body, but subsequently broke up. The Deep Lead/Stawell Congregation was established in early 2012-but disassociated in 2014, the minister subsequently being called to a Reformed and Presbyterian Congregation in Rockhampton. The total following is about 15 people including three ministers, one with seven children residing in Beaufort (Vic).

== Theology ==
The Australian Free Church holds to the historic Presbyterian confessions, these are:

- Westminster Confession of Faith
- Westminster Shorter Catechism
- Westminster Larger Catechism

== See also ==
- List of Presbyterian and Reformed denominations in Australia
