= Reformed Congregations =

Conservative Calvinist church

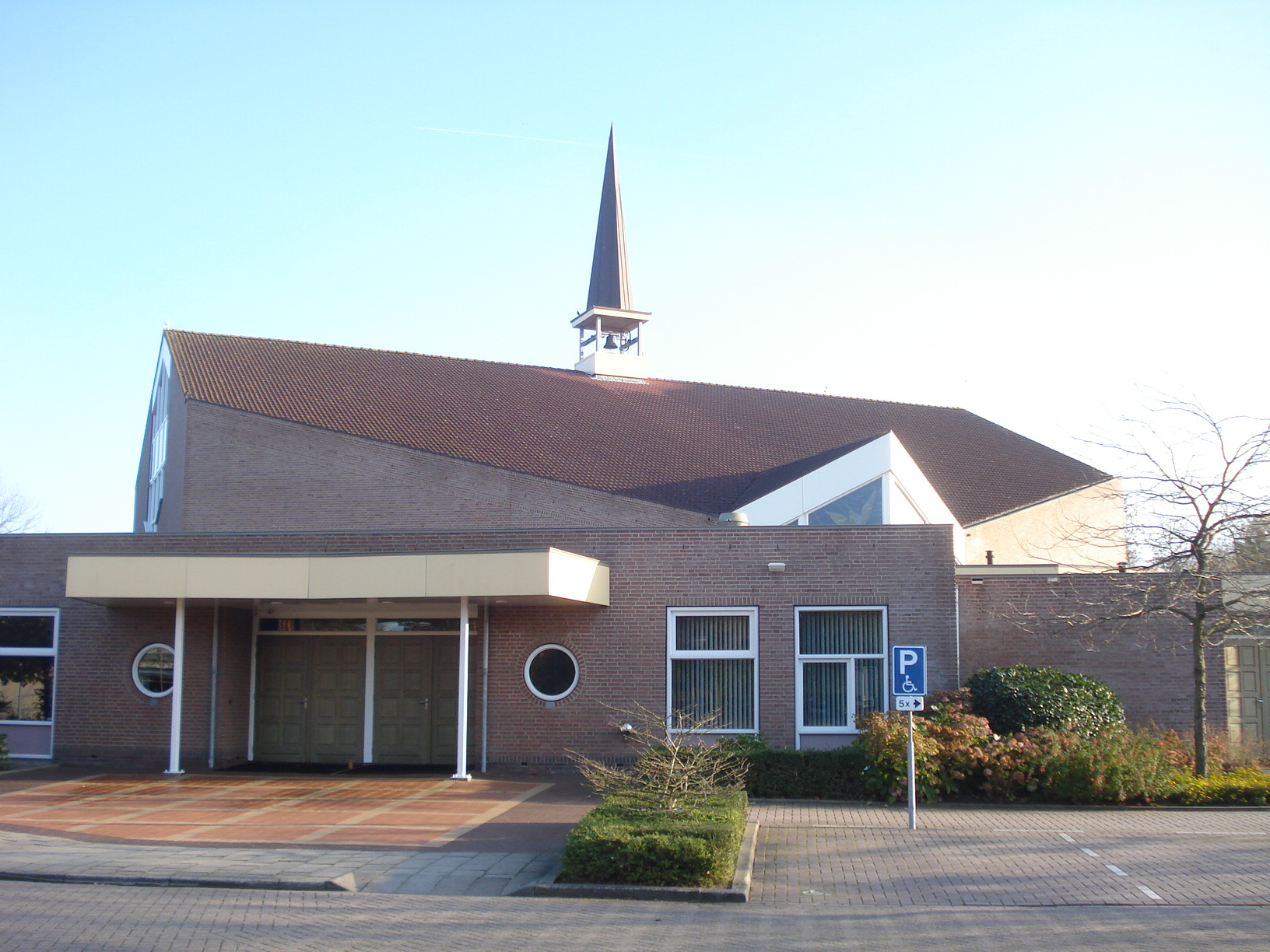
- Classification: Protestant
- Theology: Calvinist
- Polity: Presbyterian
- Origin: 1907; Netherlands
- Merger of: the unification of Reformed Churches under the Cross and the Ledeboerian congregations
- Separations: 1953 the Reformed Congregations in the Netherlands separated
- Congregations: 151
- Members: 106,325
- Ministers: 67

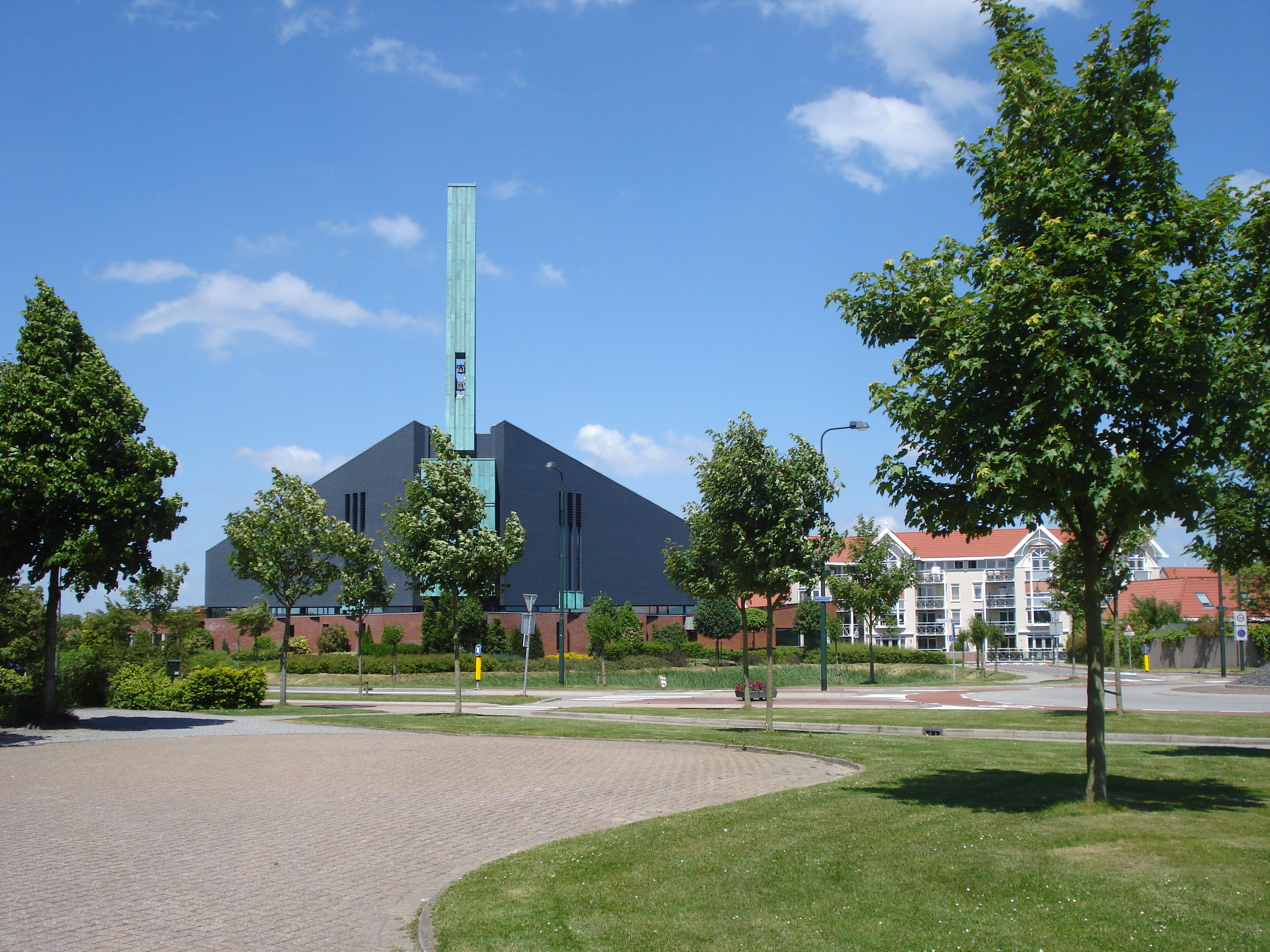
Reformed Congregation in Tholen

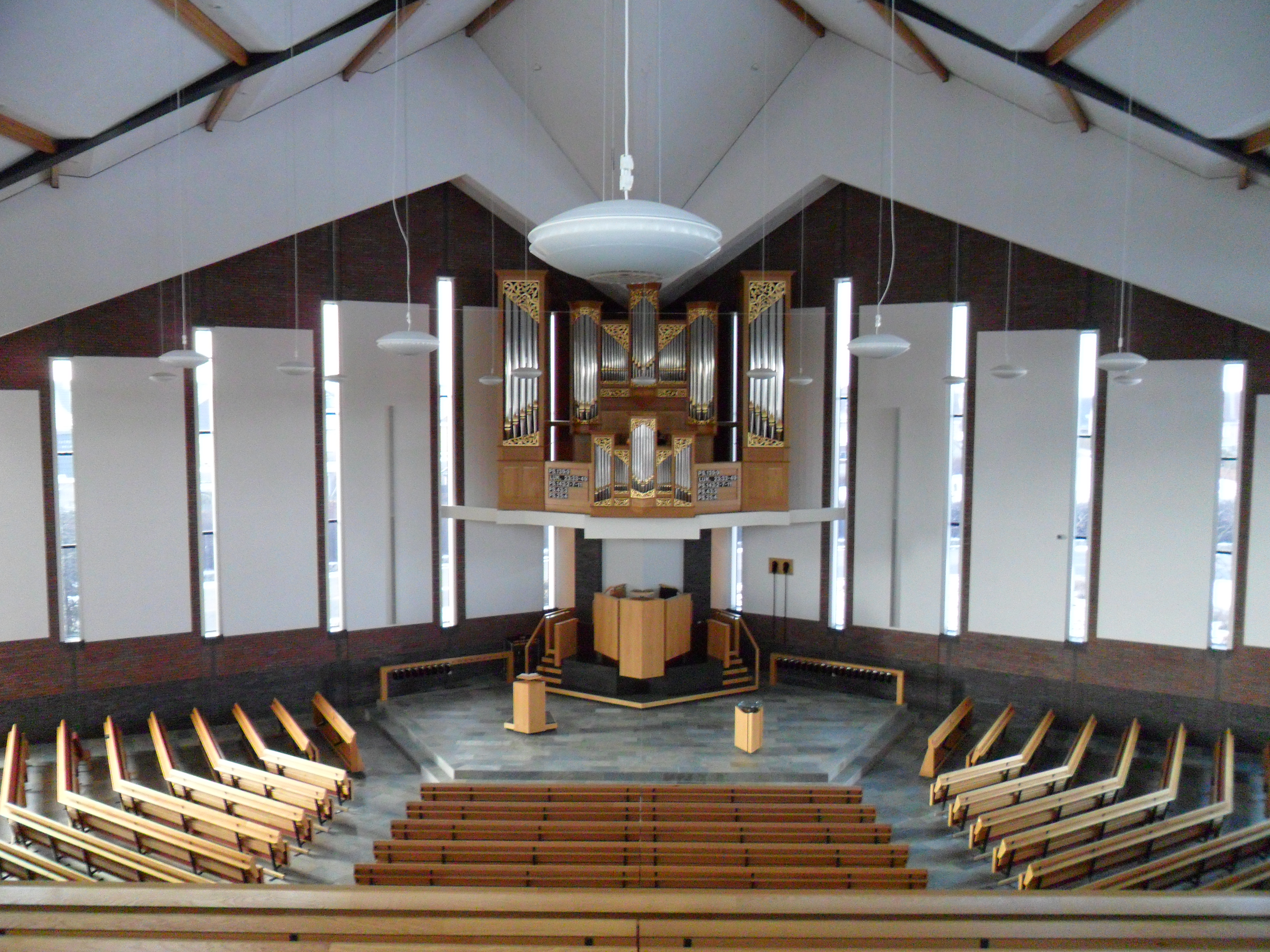
Church interior of a Reformed Congregation (Genemuiden)

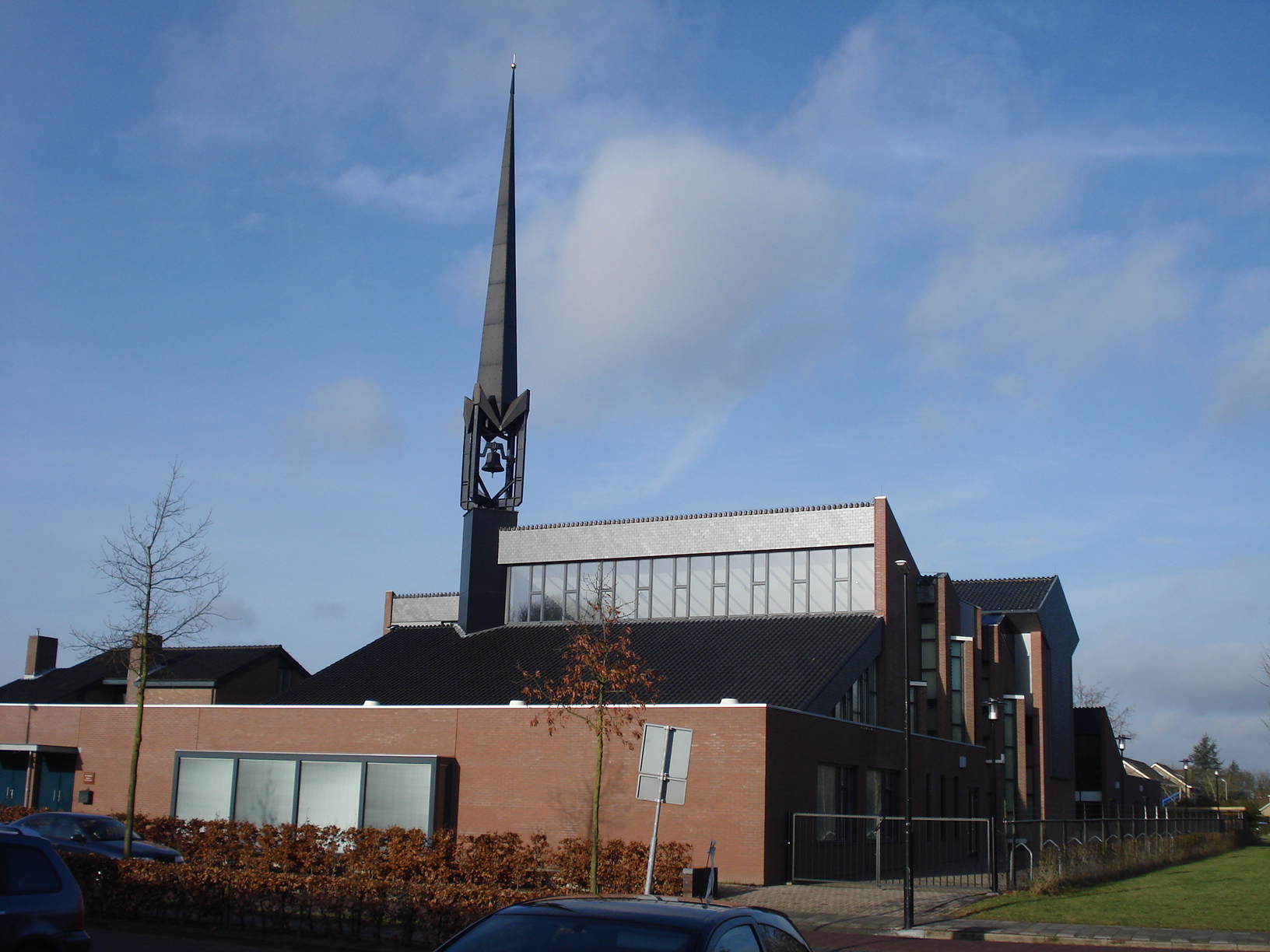
Elim Church in 's-Gravenpolder

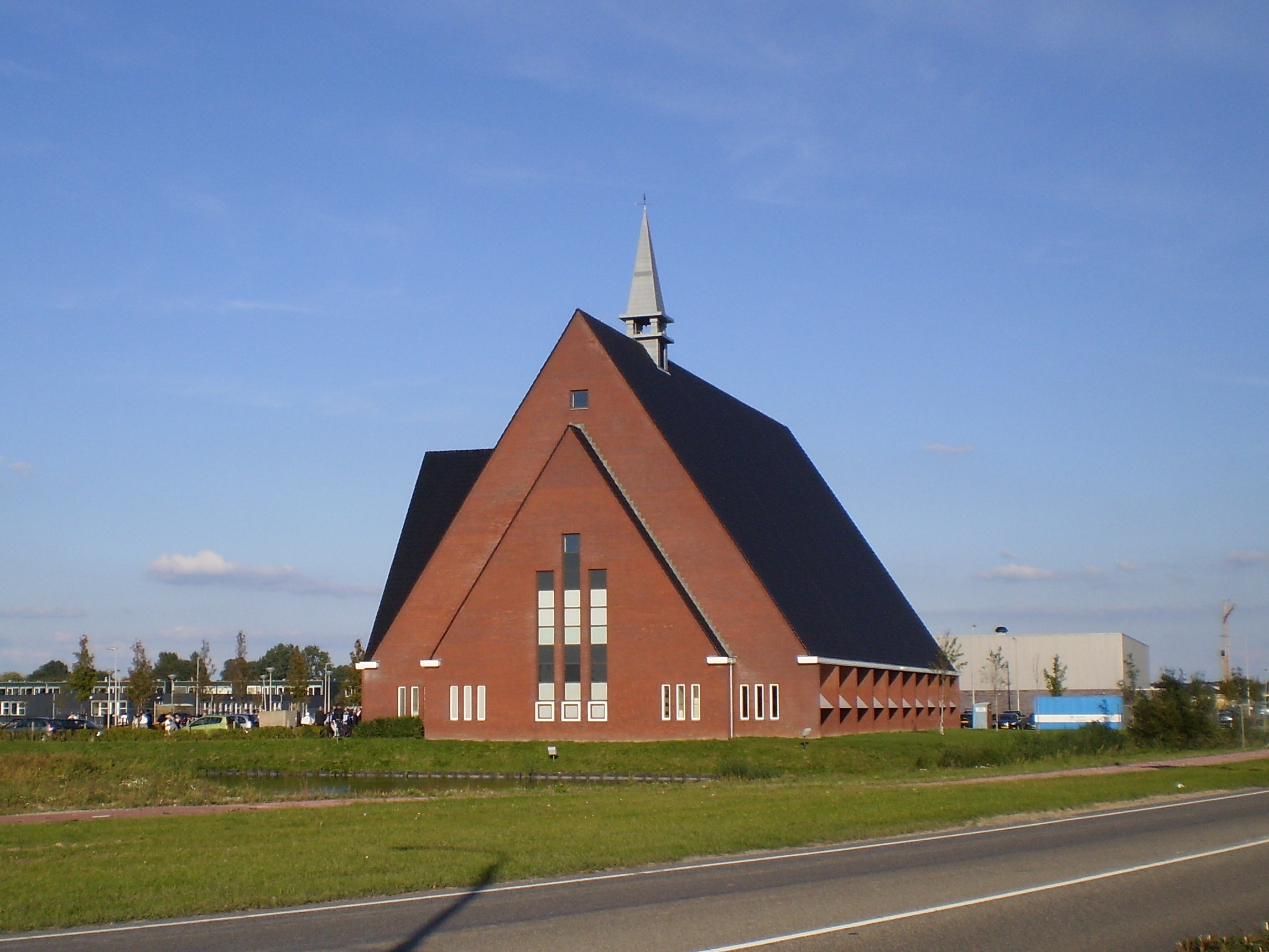
Barendrecht Reformed Congregation

The Reformed Congregations (in Dutch: Gereformeerde Gemeenten, abbreviated GerGem) is a conservative Reformed church with 149 congregations in the Netherlands, 1 in Randburg, South Africa and 1 congregation in Carterton, New Zealand. The denomination has approximately 106,325 members as of 1 January 2026. It is Calvinist in theology. It is affiliated with the North American Netherlands Reformed Congregations.

The denomination is also sometimes called the Reformed Congregations in the Netherlands and North America, which can be confused with the Reformed Churches in the Netherlands (in Dutch: Gereformeerde Kerken in Nederland, abbreviated GKN), which were formed 1892 and which merged with the Netherlands Reformed Church (in Dutch: Nederlands Hervormde Kerk, abbreviated NHK) in 2004.

== History ==
The Reformed Congregations was formed in 1907 as a federation of the Reformed Churches under the Cross, which had its roots in 1834, and the Lederboerian reformed congregations. The founder was Gerrit Hendrik Kersten (1882–1948). Kersten not only brought unification, but he helped organise the federation.

In 1909, the Reformed Churches in the Netherlands requested to unite with the Reformed Congregations. Due to theological differences, the union was declined. In 1926, a Calvinist seminary was founded in Rotterdam.

In 1929, the church had 67 congregations and 26,380 members. Twenty years later, the numbers had risen to 140 congregations and 62,000 members, more than double of the congregations and an annual growth rate of 6.7 percent.

In 1931, the denomination prepared the so-called "doctrines of '31", which gave an elaboration of the doctrine of the denomination's attention to man. During World War II, many Reformed congregation church buildings were destroyed.

=== Schism in 1953 ===
Shortly after the end of the war, there was a period of theological controversies in the denomination. The cause of the schism of 1953 was the deposition of Rev Dr. C. Steenblok as a lecturer at the Theological School of the Reformed Congregations, but a different view on the free offer of the gospel also played a role; the Reformed Congregations held to the view of a free, well-meant offer of the gospel, but the congregations who split off did not. In 1953, the Reformed Congregations in the Netherlands was born.

=== Recent history ===
The Reformed Congregations have experienced a steady growth, in spite of the progressive secularisation in the Netherlands. The denomination grew from 53,000 members in 1953 to 106,325 in 2026. Also noteworthy is the growth in the province of Overijssel and in the town of Rijssen. The denomination's membership in the wider urban area around Rotterdam increased seven times from what it was in 1950. Several new congregations were started in the Dutch Bible Belt.

== Theology ==
=== Confessions ===
The church holds to the absolute authority of the Bible. The church adheres to the:

- Belgic Confession
- Heidelberg catechism
- Canons of Dort.

The Reformed Congregations theological orientation stem from the time of the Further Reformation. In worship, they use only the so-called "Statenvertaling" of the Bible, which was made on orders of the assembled authorities of the Republic of the United Netherlands Provinces in the 17th century and which can be compared with the King James Version of the Bible.

The church believes in:

- authority of the Bible
- inability of man to the glory of God
- life in Christ
- covenant of Grace
- covenant of Redemption

== Church buildings ==
The Lederboerian churches originally came together in barns, living rooms, warehouses and workshops. Often less than 20 people were present. In 1844, a large stone church was built in Rotterdam. In 1850, a wooden church was built in Benthuizen. They still hoped to return to the official Reformed Church (NHK). A lot of churches can be characterised as barn churches. In the 1930s, due to the growth of the church, building continued. There were smaller churches in Lisse and other small towns. After World War II churches were built more widely. In the last quarter of the 20th century modern buildings were constructed in Meliskerke, Goes and Groningen. In the 21st century, in Tholen, Geldermalsen and Opheusden church buildings from the late 60's and early 70's were taken down and replaced by new buildings. Furthermore, in Barneveld, Scherpenzeel, Gouda, Middelharnis, Dirksland and Ede new buildings were built after 2000. Besides building, in a few places churches were acquired from other denominations, examples are the Westerkerk in Utrecht (1966) (before moving to the Nieuwe Westerkerk in 2018), the Ontmoetingskerk in Enkhuizen, the Magnalia Deikerk in Groningen and the Hoofdstraatkerk in Leiderdorp.

== Statistics ==
The church had 106,325 members in 2024. The Reformed Churches has 149 congregations, 12 classes and 4 synods. The statistics show steady growth since the founding of the church. The denomination has a 91-member congregation in Randburg, South Africa. There is also a church in Carterton, New Zealand (192 members) and a church plant of 47 members in Belgium.

The 27 congregations in North-America and one in Bolivia are part of the sister denomination: Netherlands Reformed Congregations which has 10,648 members.

Missionary projects are in Java with the Gereja Jemaat Protestan di Indonesia, which has 10,000 members and 68 congregations. In Nigeria, there is the Nigeria Reformed Church with 14 congregations and 2,500 members.
