= Stavenisse =

- Village
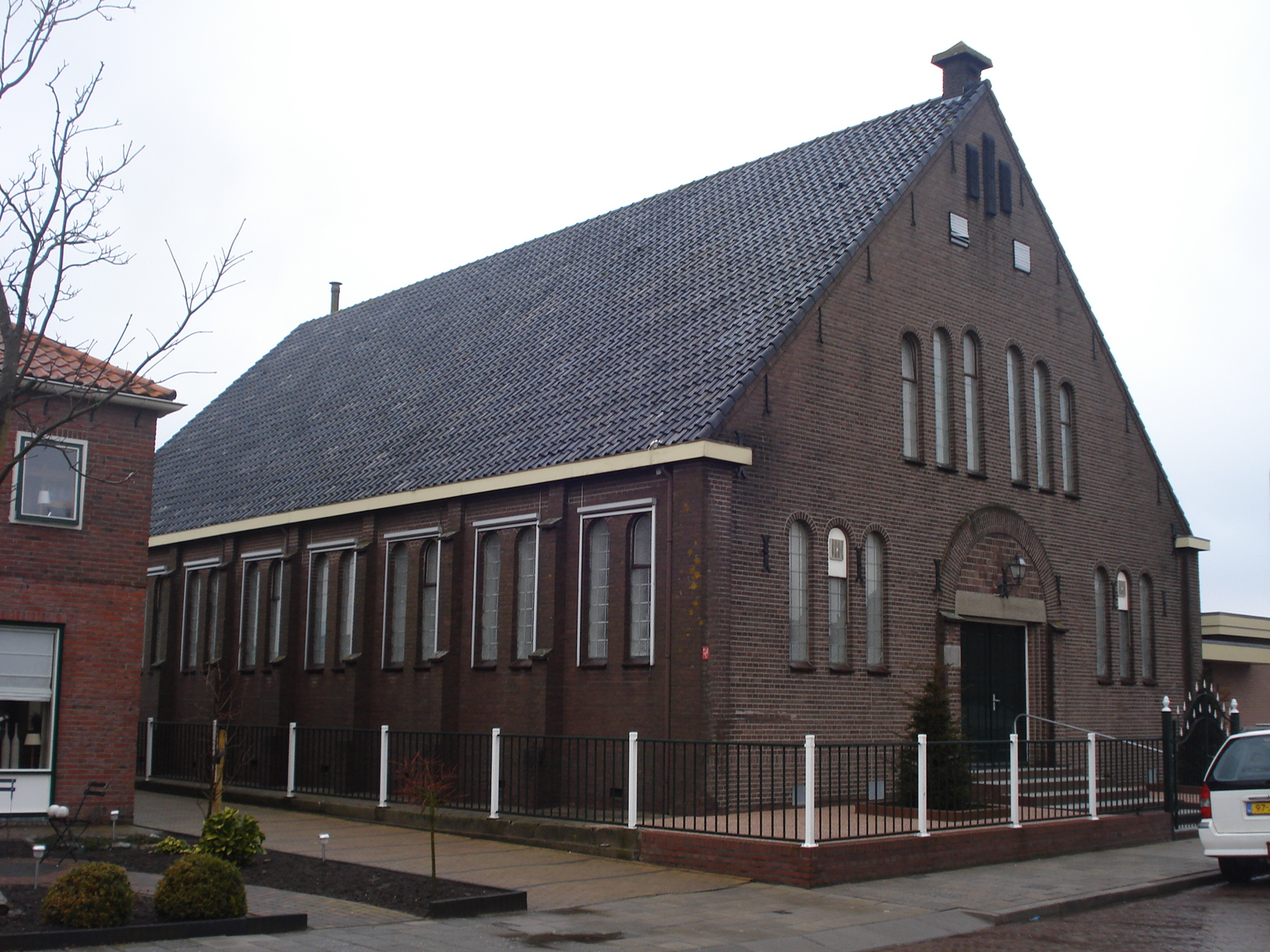
- Old Reformed Congregation

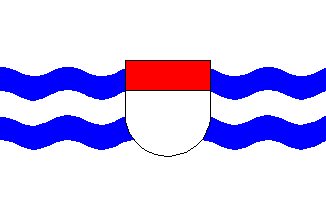
- Flag Coat of arms

- Location in the province of Zeeland in the Netherlands Stavenisse (Netherlands)
- Coordinates: 51°35′10″N 4°0′44″E
- Country: Netherlands
- Province: Zeeland
- Municipality: Tholen

Area
  - Total: 11.32 km^{2} (4.37 sq mi)
- Elevation: 0.3 m (0.98 ft)

Population (2021)
  - Total: 1,710
  - Density: 151/km^{2} (391/sq mi)
- Time zone: UTC+1 (CET)
  - Summer (DST): UTC+2 (CEST)
- Postal code: 4696
- Dialing code: 0166

Stavenisse is a village in the Dutch province of Zeeland. It is a part of the municipality of Tholen, and lies about 22 kilometres (14 mi) west of Bergen op Zoom.

== History ==
The village was first mentioned in 1206 as Stauenesse, and is a combination of headland and wooden pool. The original village developed around the salt marshes were diked in the 11th century. The village disappeared in the flood of 1509. In 1599, the area was poldered by order Hendrik van Tuyll van Serooskerke. A castle was built between the harbour and the church, but was demolished in 1753, and only a garden with some remnants remain.

The Dutch Reformed church is a T-shaped church dating from 1617. The tower was added in 1672. Between 1910 and 1911, the church was remodelled in a rationalist style.

Stavenisse was home to 1,257 people in 1840. Stavenisse was severely flooded during the North Sea flood of 1953. The sea dike was breached in six places and the harbour dike in two places, and the water rose to 3.5 metres (11 ft) above street level. Of the 1737 inhabitants, 153 died. A total of 140 houses were destroyed. There are still 19 wooden emergency houses in the village which were donated by the people of Norway, but one has been moved to the museum in Sint-Annaland.

== Gallery ==
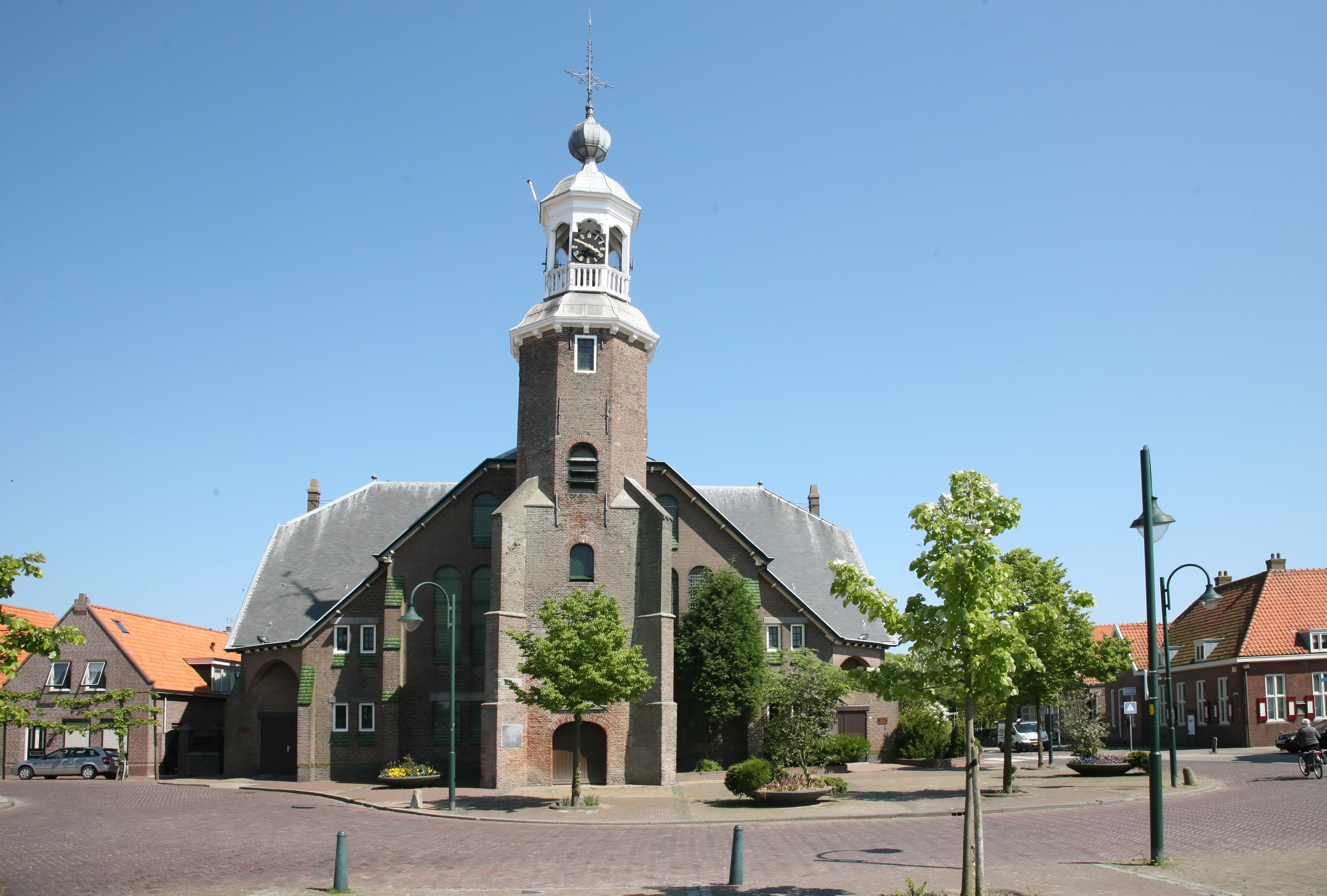
Dutch Reformed church

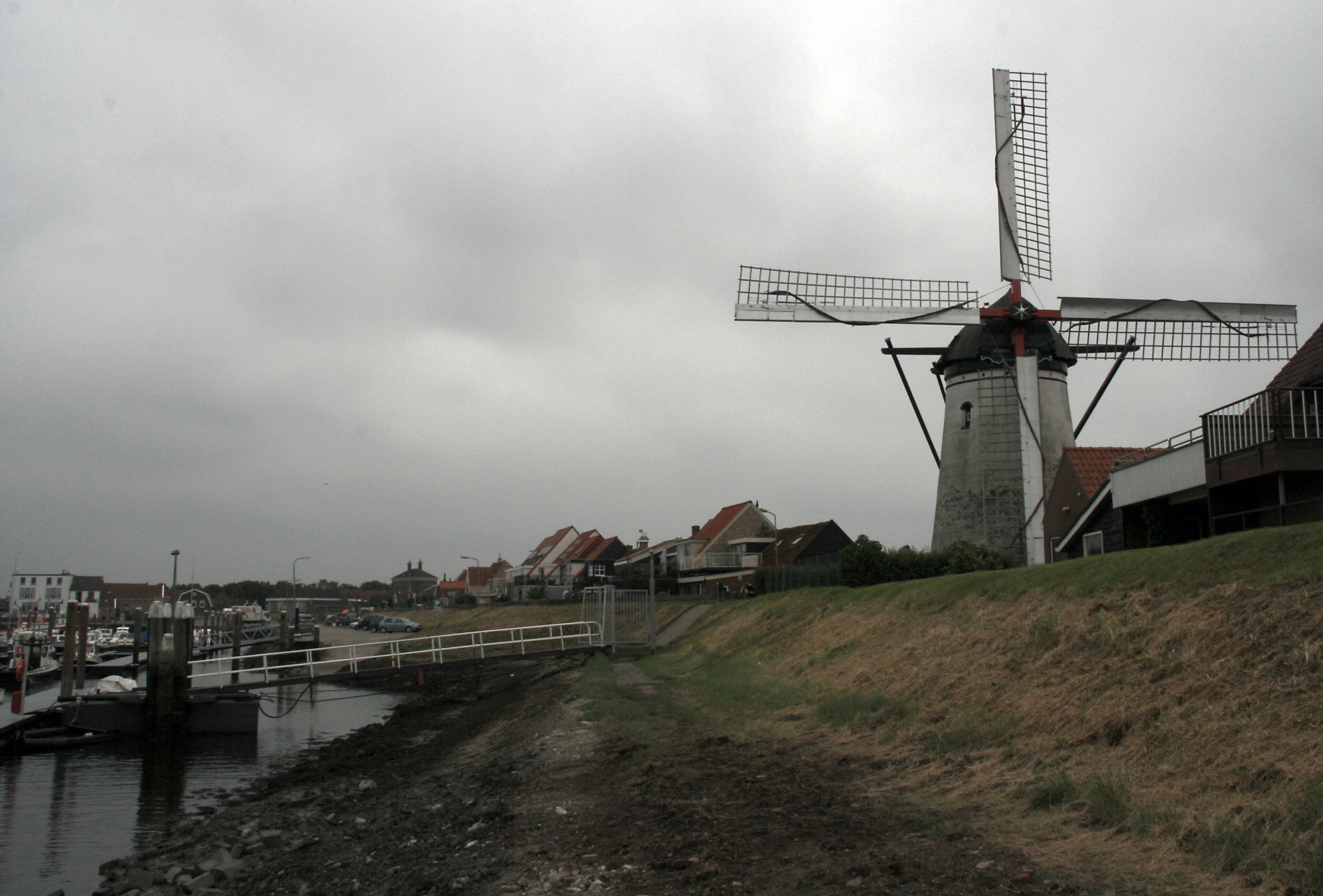
Wind mill and harbour

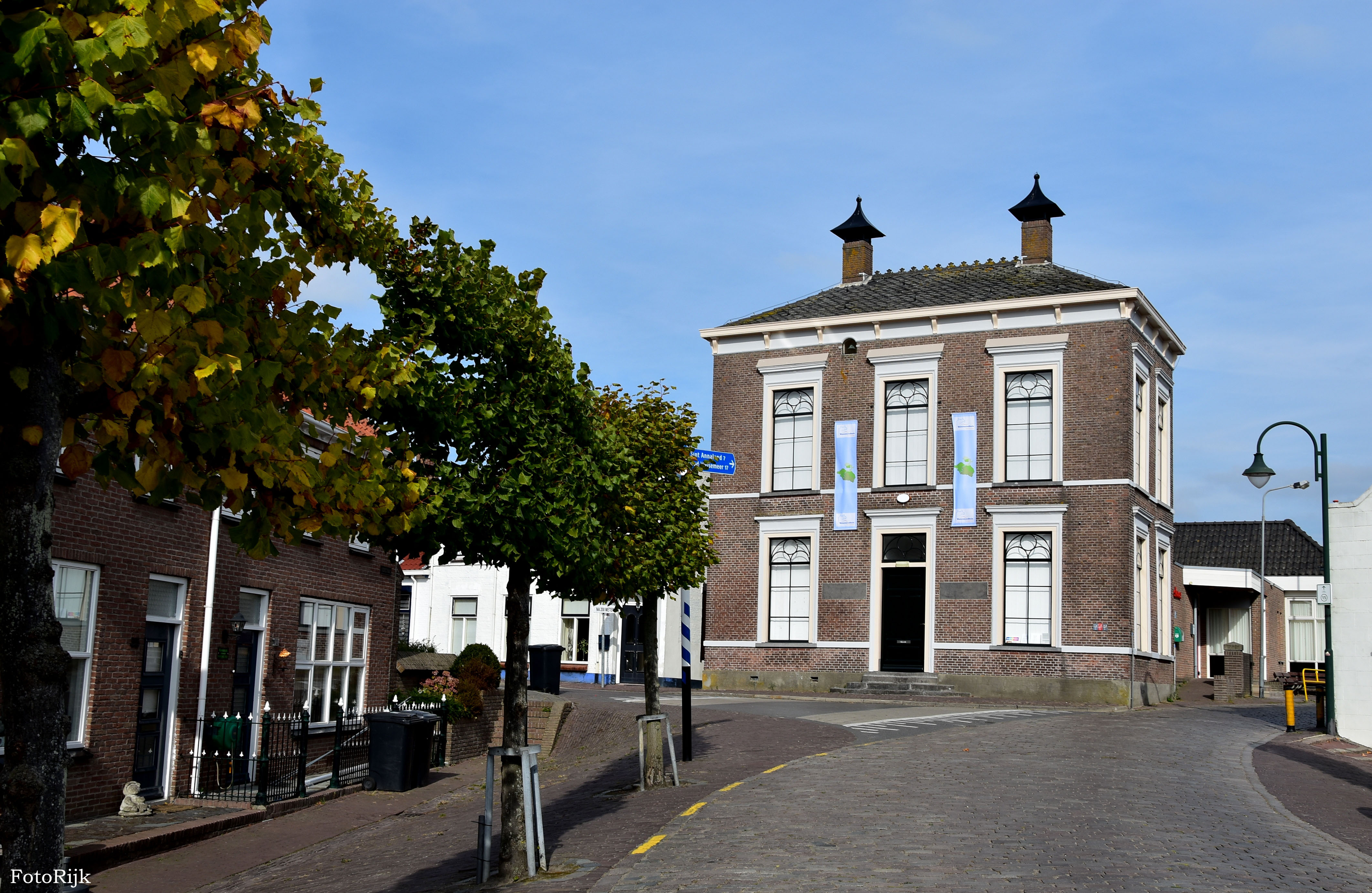
Former town hall

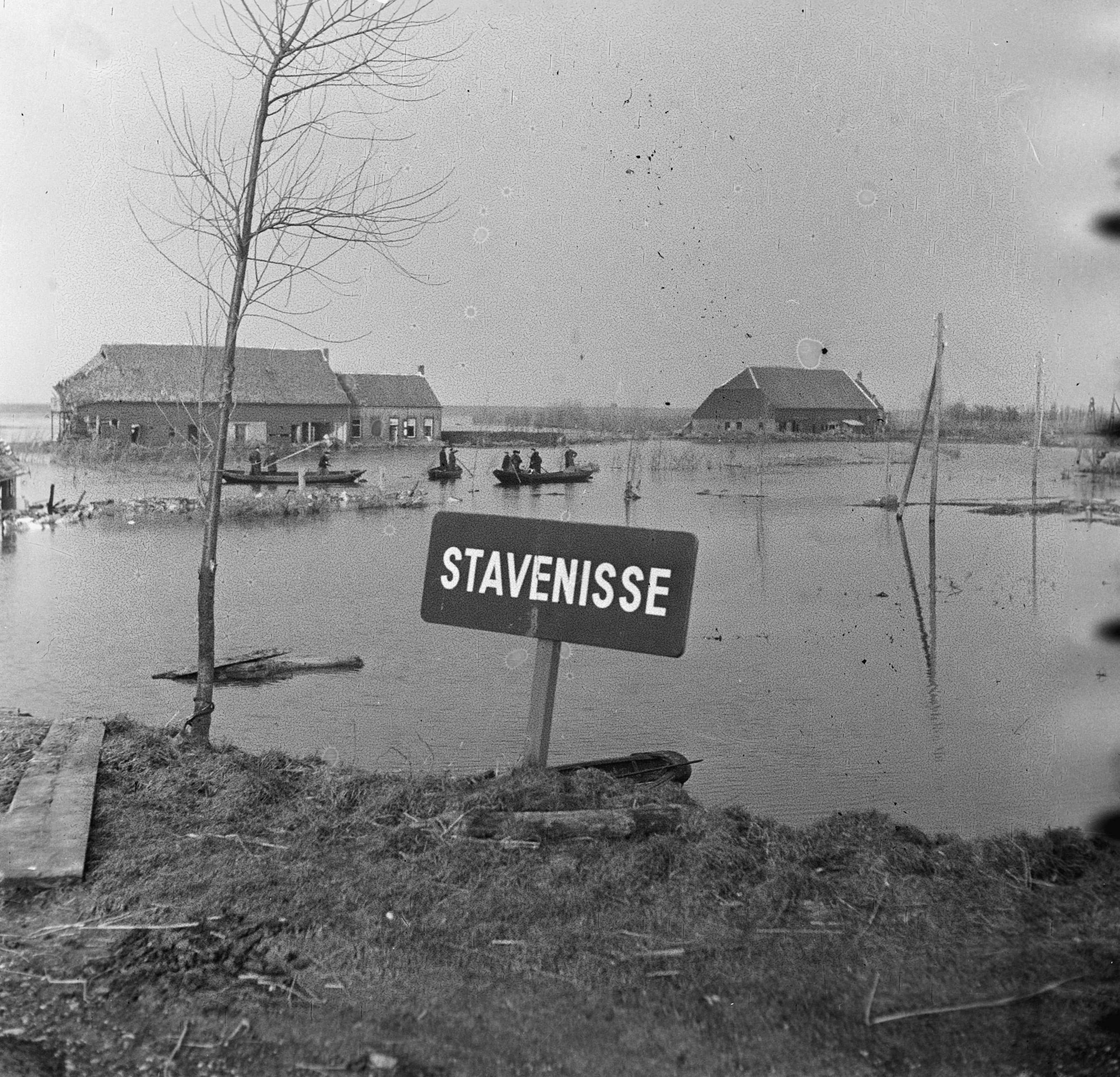
Stavenisse (17 February 1953)
