= Reformed Congregations in the Netherlands (unconnected) =

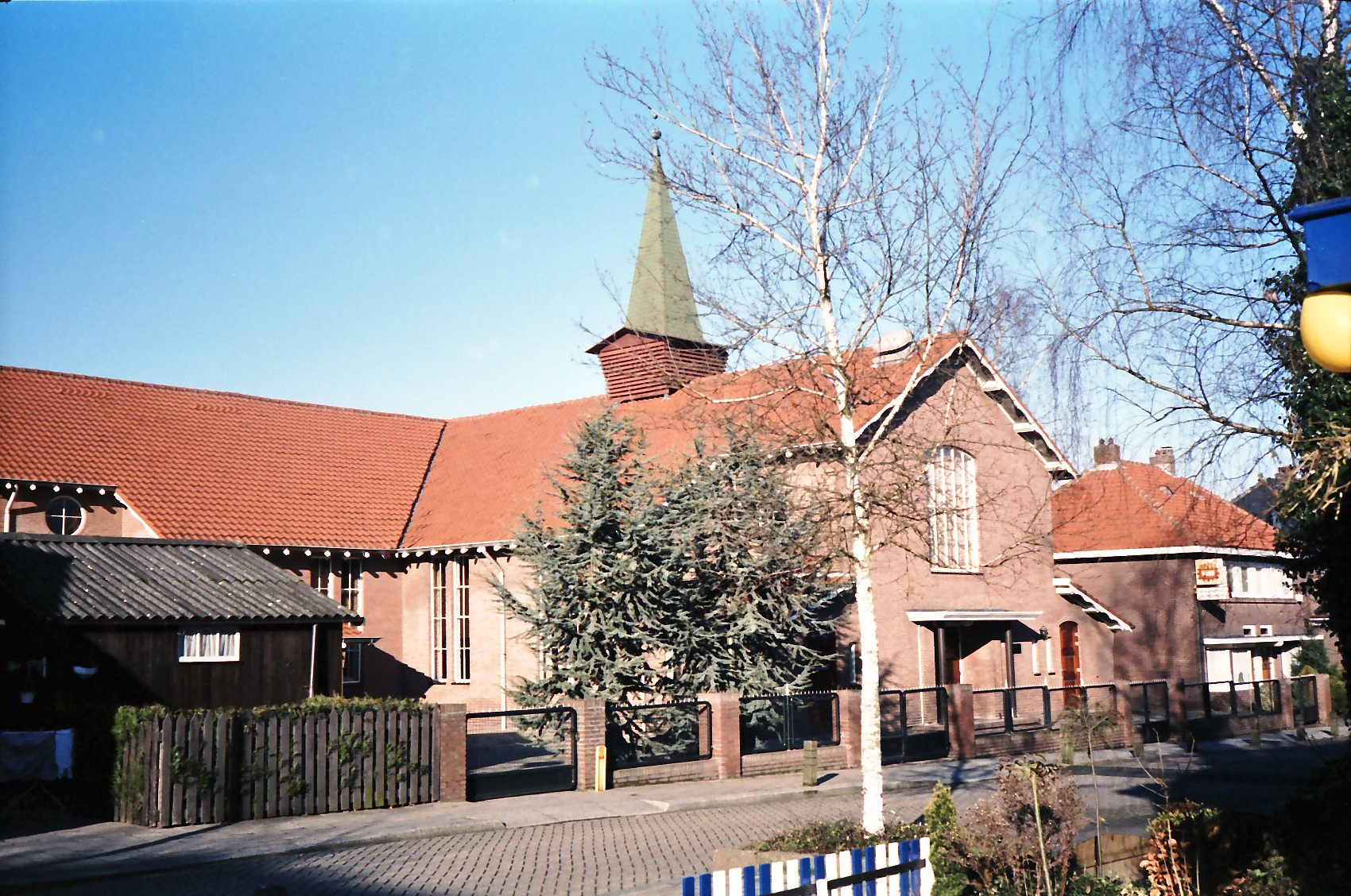
Church building in Veenendaal

The Reformed Congregations in the Netherlands (unconnected) was founded in 1980, by a dissenting group from the Reformed Congregations in the Netherlands. Unconnected means outside the structure of the Reformed Congregations in the Netherlands. Seven congregations and 3,000 members belong to this church. It adheres to the Apostles Creed, Nicene Creed, Athanasian Creed, Heidelberg Catechism, Canons of Dort.
