= Gereja Jemaat Protestan di Indonesia =

Christian denomination in Indonesia

Gereja Jemaat Protestan di Indonesia is a Reformed church in the Province of Papua in Indonesia. It was created on 25 June 1984 by the Reformed Congregations in the Netherlands. It began pioneer mission work in the Yali territory. Historically this was known as Irian Jaya and was part of the Dutch East Indies. In Papua there are 250 different languages.

The Mission started in 1962, the first baptism was performed in December 1969. On that day 96 adults and 51 children were baptised. Ten new mission location opened in Nipsan, Langda, Bomela and in other towns, in southern lowlands in Dela Sera, Samboka, and Sumtamon. In 1974 the Nipsan station was destroyed by indigenous warriors, 14 were killed, later it was reopened. A second classis were opened in the unai-spoken eastern part of the mountains. The church affirms the Three Forms of Unity.

The first Synod was held on 25 June 1984. In 2012 the denomination had 68 congregations and 16 outreach points, with 11,000 members but attendance is significantly higher. The federation has 24 ministers. The church office located in Wamena, Indonesia.

The federation is working with Gereja-Gereja Reformasi di Indonesia a denomination with 8,000 members. This church was a fruit of the missionaries of the Reformed Churches in the Netherlands (Liberated).
