= Free offer of the gospel =

The free offer of the Gospel, sometimes called the well-meant offer of the gospel, in Christian theology, is the offer of salvation in Jesus Christ to all people. It is generally accepted by Calvinists, but rejected by a few small Reformed denominations, such as the Evangelical Presbyterian Church in Australia, the Protestant Reformed Churches in America, the Reformed Congregations in the Netherlands (Dutch: Gereformeerde Gemeenten in Nederland, abbreviated GGiN) and also by some English Strict Baptists of longer standing, such as John Gill and, later, the Gospel Standard Strict Baptists.

The free offer of the Gospel was a point that the Marrow Brethren sought to defend, seeing the high Calvinists who denied the doctrine as misguided.

== See also ==
- Hyper-Calvinism
