= Nigeria Reformed Church =

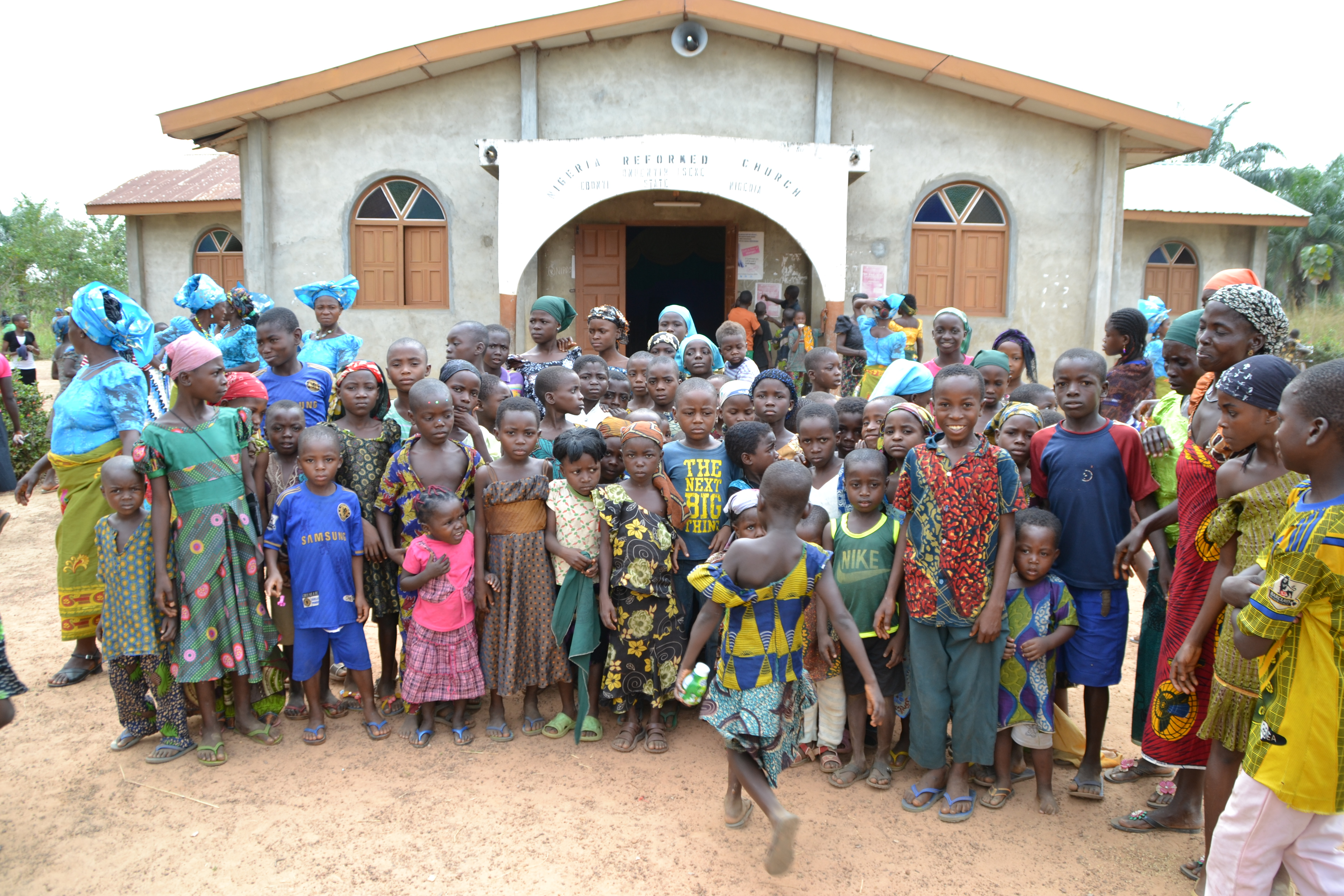

The Nigeria Reformed Church was a mission project of the Reformed Congregations in the Netherlands. The work was started in 1970. In 2000 the denomination had 1,911 members. The church operates in the Izi tribe, comprising about a half million members in the north of Anambra state. The first mission point was opened on 28 August 1977. Over the years missionary congregations created and instituted. In April 1988 the federation was instituted with 17 ministers and 8 deacons served the church. Since then, it has become independent. In 2011 the church had 2,500 members in 14 local congregations, 6 mission district in 4 Classis. The church served 9 pastors and 26 evangelists. Currently there are two missionaries working in Nigeria. The Heidelberg Catechism, the Canons of Dort and the Belgic Confession are the official standards.
