= Reformed Congregations in the Netherlands =

Pietistic Reformed church

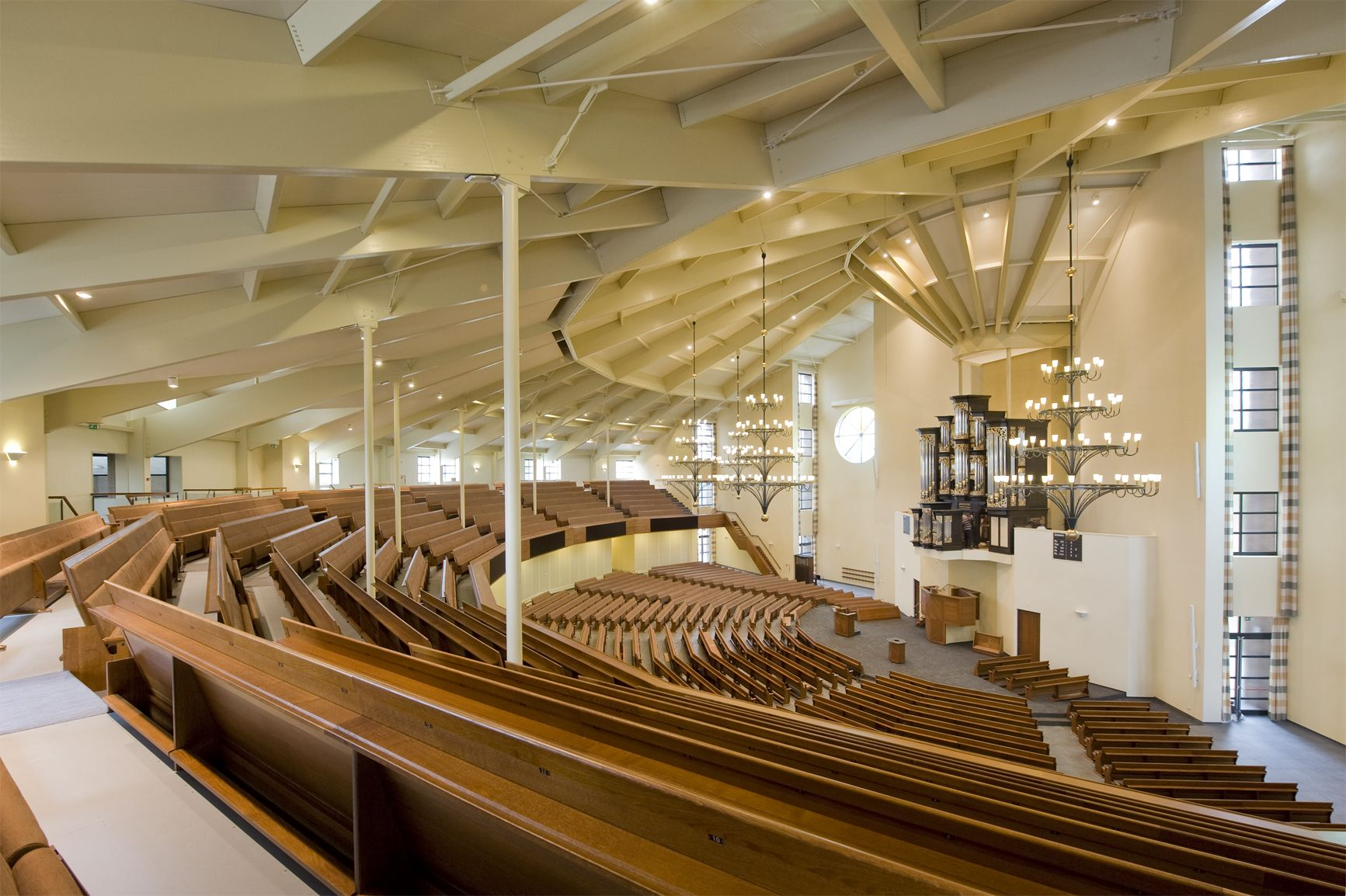
- Classification: Protestant
- Theology: Reformed, Evangelical
- Polity: Presbyterian
- Region: Netherlands, South Africa, North America
- Origin: 1953; Netherlands
- Congregations: 49
- Members: 23,695 (1 January 2022)

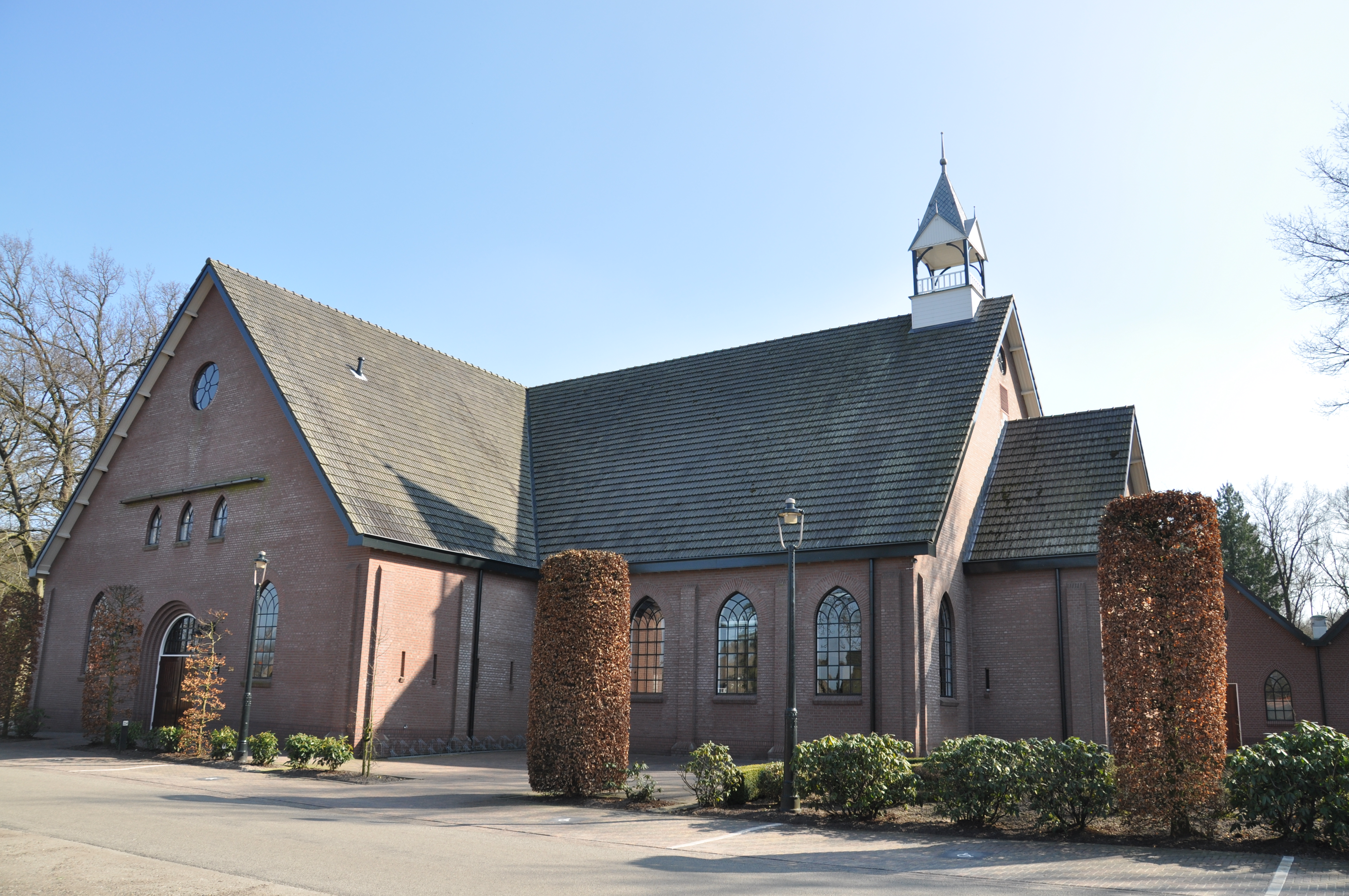
Reformed Congregation De Beek-Uddel

The Reformed Congregations in the Netherlands (Dutch: Gereformeerden Gemeenten in Nederland, abbreviated GGiN) is a pietistic Reformed church located mainly in the Netherlands, along with five congregations in North America and one in Pretoria, South Africa.

== History ==
The church was founded in 1953 when Dr. C. Steenblok was dismissed from the theological seminary of the Reformed Congregations in Rotterdam, because he taught that God does not offer grace to all sinners, but only those persons who are elected and acknowledge their sins. In 1953 the church split.

== Statistics ==
The church had a membership of 23,786 in 2010. There were 23,985 members in 2019. On 1 January 2022, the church had 23,695 members in 49 congregations.

== Notable members ==
- Rinus Terlouw
- Chris Stoffer

== See also ==
- De Hoeksteen, Barneveld
