= Lorna Hood =

Scottish minister

The Very Reverend Lorna Hood OBE QHC
- Moderator of the General Assembly
- Church: Church of Scotland
- Elected: 18 May 2013
- In office: 2013 to 2014
- Predecessor: Albert Bogle
- Successor: John Chalmers
- Other posts: Minister of North Parish Church, Renfrew (1979–2016)

Orders
- Ordination: 1978

Personal details
- Born: Elizabeth Lorna Hood; 21 April 1953 (age 73)
- Denomination: Presbyterianism
- Spouse: Peter (m. 1979)
- Children: Two
- Education: Kilmarnock Academy; University of Glasgow

Elizabeth Lorna Hood, OBE, QHC (born 21 April 1953) is a minister of the Church of Scotland. From 1979 to 2016, she was the minister of North Parish Church, Renfrew. From 2013 to 2014, she also served as Moderator of its General Assembly. She is an Extra Chaplain to the King in Scotland, appointed in September 2023.

== Early life and education ==
Hood was born in Irvine, Ayrshire on 21 April 1953. She was educated at Kilmarnock Academy. She studied at the University of Glasgow, graduating with an undergraduate Master of Arts (MA (Hons)) degree in 1974 and a Bachelor of Divinity (BD) degree in 1977.

== Ordained ministry ==
She was ordained by the Church of Scotland's Presbytery of Edinburgh in 1978 whilst serving as Assistant Minister at St Ninian's Church in Corstorphine, Edinburgh. She was inducted to her charge of the North Parish Church in Renfrew in June 1979.

Hood retired from full-time ministry in October 2016. Having led Renfrew North Parish Church for 37 years, she holds the record as the "longest-serving woman parish minister".

In 2008 she was appointed to be one of ten Chaplains to Queen Elizabeth II in Scotland. She was appointed an Extra Chaplain to King Charles III in Scotland in September 2023.

=== Moderator ===
On 30 October 2012, Hood was nominated to be Moderator of the General Assembly of the Church of Scotland for 2013/2014; she was duly formally elected as moderator on 18 May 2013 – the first day of the General Assembly's week-long annual session.

Hood was to have been succeeded as moderator by Angus Morrison. On 18 March 2014 the Church of Scotland announced that Morrison had withdrawn his nomination on grounds of ill health. On 2 April it was announced that she was to be succeeded by John Chalmers, the Principal Clerk to the General Assembly.

== Personal life ==
In 1979, the then Lorna Mitchell married Peter Hood. They have two grown up children.

== Honours ==
In February 2013 she was assessed as one of the 100 most powerful women in the United Kingdom by Woman's Hour on BBC Radio 4.

In 2013 Lorna Hood accepted Honorary Membership of the Irvine Burns Club offered in recognition of her achievements, links with Ayrshire and her interest in the life and legacy of Robert Burns.

In December 2014 she was awarded an Honorary Degree of Doctor of Divinity by the University of Glasgow.

In the 2017 Birthday Honours, Hood was appointed an Officer of the Order of the British Empire (OBE) "for services to the Church of Scotland and charity".

== Styles ==
- 1978–2013: The Reverend Lorna Hood
- 2013–2014: The Right Reverend Lorna Hood
- 2014–present: The Very Reverend Dr Lorna Hood

Religious titles
Preceded by Albert Bogle	Moderator of the General Assembly of the Church of Scotland; 2013–2014	Succeeded by John Chalmers
