= James Curdie Russell =

Scottish minister

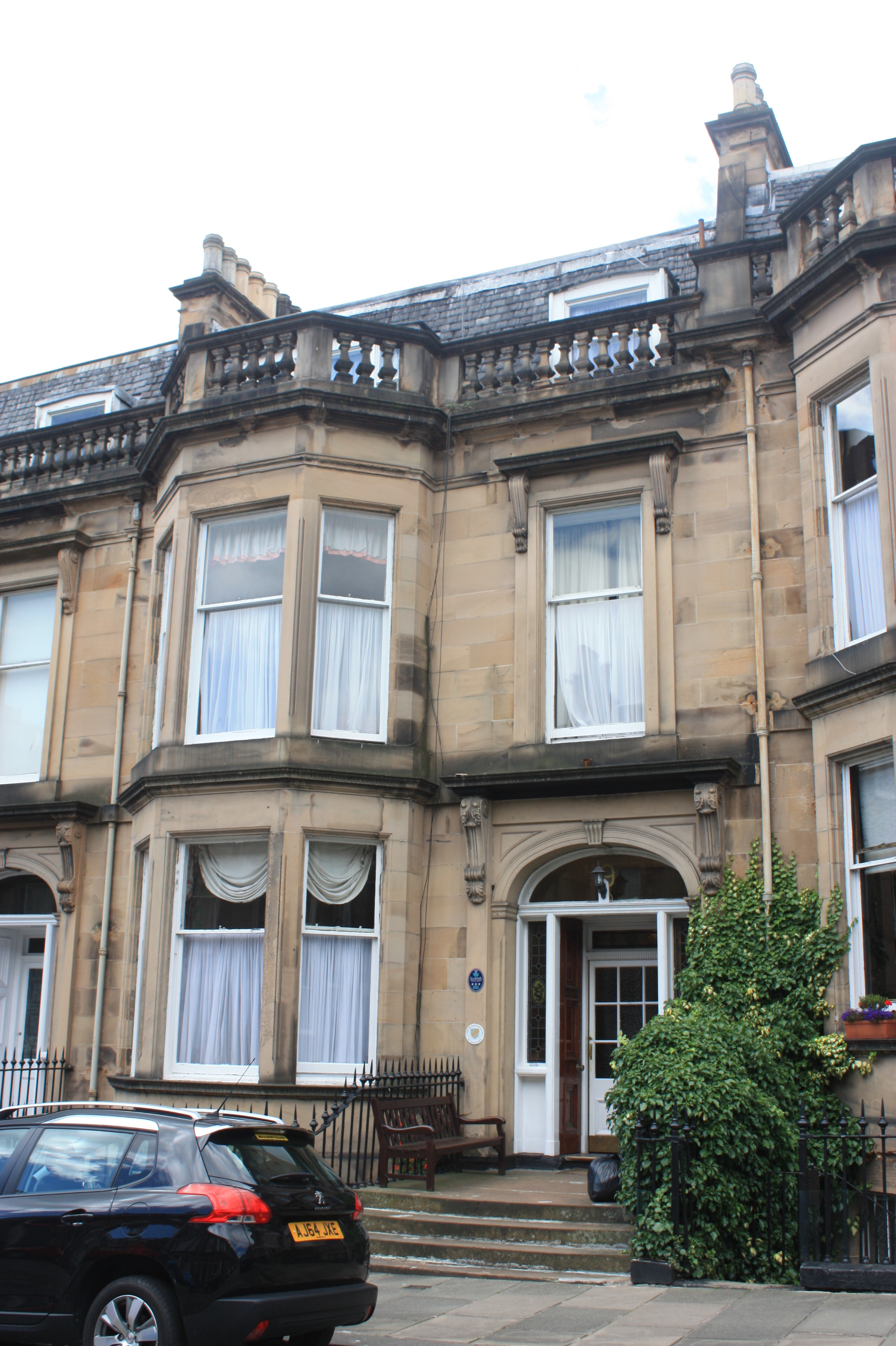
Russell's house at 9 Coates Gardens, Edinburgh

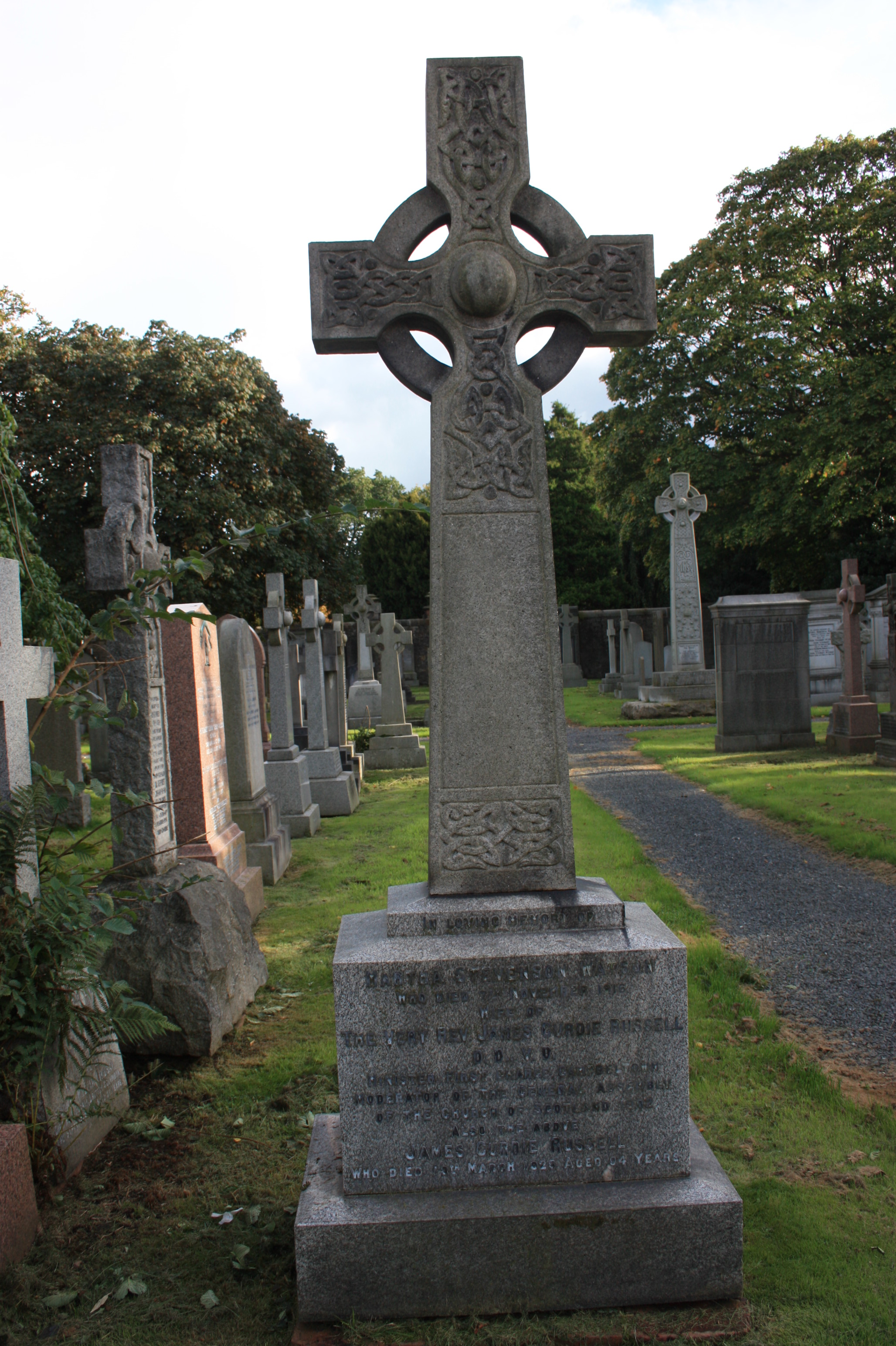
The grave of Russell, Dean Cemetery, Edinburgh

James Curdie Russell (1830-1925) was a Scottish minister. He served as Moderator of the General Assembly of the Church of Scotland in 1902.

== Life ==
He was born in 1830.

He was minister of Campbeltown from 1854 and remained there for most of his life. He advocated the use of Gaelic in services.

He received an honorary doctorate (DD) in 1881 from Glasgow University. In 1903 (along with the Very Rev John Pagan) he was one of the several former Moderators invited to the official coronation of King Edward VII.

He retired to Edinburgh living at 9 Coates Gardens in the West End.

He died in 1925 and is buried with his wife in Dean Cemetery in western Edinburgh.

== Bequests ==
He endowed three scholarships (Curdie Russell Scholarship) in Divinity to Glasgow University, with a preference to those versed in Gaelic.

== Family ==
He was married to Martha Stevenson Watson (d.1916).
