= Free Presbyterian Church of Scotland =

Christian denomination

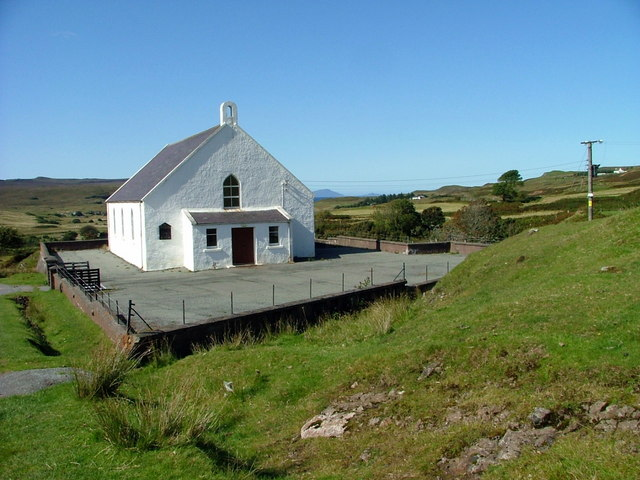
- Free Presbyterian Church of Scotland, Glendale, Isle of Skye
- Classification: Protestant
- Scripture: King James Version
- Theology: Reformed
- Polity: Presbyterian polity
- Origin: 1893
- Separated from: Free Church of Scotland (1843–1900)
- Separations: Associated Presbyterian Churches (separated 1989)
- Congregations: 46 worldwide (29 in Scotland)
- Official website: www.fpchurch.org.uk (closed on Sundays) (Note: If the website is accessed on a Sunday, all pages will redirect to a short message about using the internet on the Sabbath. If necessary, it is possible to access the website on Sundays by changing the date/time on devices as the block occurs client-side.)

The Free Presbyterian Church of Scotland (FPC Church; Scottish Gaelic: An Eaglais Shaor Chlèireach, IPA: [əɲ ˌekɫ̪əʃ ˌhɯːɾ ˈçleːɾʲəx]) was formed in 1893. The Church identifies itself as the spiritual descendant of the Scottish Reformation. The Church web-site states that it is "the constitutional heir of the historic Church of Scotland". Its adherents are occasionally referred to as Seceders or the Wee Wee Frees. Although small, the church has congregations on five continents.

The Free Presbyterian Church of Scotland is Calvinist in doctrine, worship and practice and the community believes and professes that it accurately practises and adheres to the Word of God: the Bible. The subordinate standard of the church is the Westminster Confession of Faith.

== History ==
Timeline showing the evolution of the churches of Scotland from 1560

=== Formation (1893) ===
The founding date of the Free Presbyterian Church of Scotland can be traced to 25 May 1893, when Rev. Donald MacFarlane (1834–1926), who was the Free Church of Scotland minister of Raasay, walked out of the General Assembly in protest.

At the 1892 Free Church of Scotland General Assembly, following the example of the United Presbyterian Church of Scotland and the Church of Scotland (1889), the Free Church of Scotland passed a Declaratory Act on 26 May 1892 relaxing the stringency of subscription to the Westminster Confession of Faith, which was widely perceived as paving the way for unification with the United Presbyterian Church.

Macfarlane was not a member of the 1892 Assembly, but he and his Kirk Session at Kilmallie recorded their protest against it.

At the 1893 General Assembly, Macfarlane, who had recently been inducted as pastor of the Raasay congregation, formally protested the Act. The General Assembly rejected his requests and thus confirmed the Act. As a result, he felt compelled to separate himself from the Free Church of Scotland. In this, he was later joined by one other minister, the Rev Donald Macdonald (1825–1901) of Shieldaig. Together they constituted a Presbytery at Raasay on 28 July 1893.

=== Growth ===
The result was that a large number of elders and some congregations, mostly in the Highlands, severed their connection with the Free Church of Scotland and formed the Free Presbyterian Church of Scotland, along lines they considered to be more orthodox. By 1907 this body had twenty congregations and twelve ministers.

A few years after the Free Presbyterian Church of Scotland was formed (in 1900), the Free Church of Scotland did indeed unite with the United Presbyterian Church of Scotland to form the United Free Church of Scotland, with a somewhat larger minority remaining outside the union and retaining the name Free Church of Scotland. Initially, some wondered if the two churches would merge, but this did not happen, partly because the grounds on which the later separation was based had been the Establishment Principle, rather than the Declaratory Act, which had only been rescinded post separation by the Free Church of Scotland (post 1900). The two denominations took a different view of the 1892 Declaratory Act: the Free Church of Scotland did not regard it as having been a binding measure while the Free Presbyterians did.

In 1905, the Free Presbyterian Synod debated proposals for union with the post-1900 Free Church minority. The Synod declared that it would consider union with a church which held "the infallibility and inerrancy of the Scriptures of the Old and New Testaments, and the whole doctrine of the Confession of Faith, both in her profession and practice". The Synod's assessment of the post-1900 Free Church was that "although she made ample profession in words", nevertheless she "came far behind in her practice". One major issue was the Free Church's employment of Professor W. M. Alexander, who had written a book which the FPs and some post-1900 Free Church conservatives believed to be ambiguous about the status of the Bible, as a lecturer in its college. A 1917 Free Church Reply to a FPC Statement of Differences stated underlined the fact that Dr Alexander had in 1905 withdrawn the book from circulation, expressed regret "for any reflections which the book was fitted to cast on the infallibility of the Word of God" and in 1906 publicly reaffirmed his belief in the inerrancy of Scripture in these words: "I cherish as more precious than life itself the absolute infallibility of the Word of God". However a motion was carried at the 1918 FPC Synod which characterized the Reply as containing "evasive statements and suggestions of compromise".

Some of the Free Presbyterian ministers preferred union with the post-1900 Free Church minority to maintaining a separate Free Presbyterian witness. In 1905 Revs John Macleod (Kames), Alexander Stewart (Edinburgh) and George Mackay (Stornoway) were accepted by the Free Church. In 1918, Revs John R Mackay (Inverness), Alexander Macrae (Portree) and Andrew Sutherland followed suit.

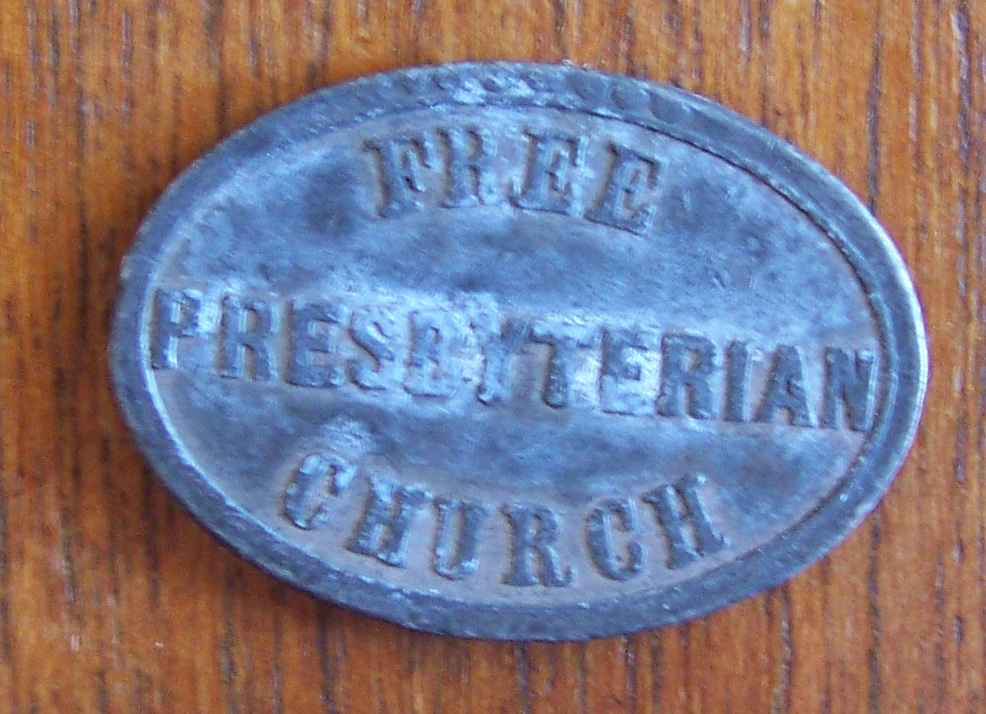
A communion token from the Free Presbyterian Church

The two denominations are often confused, though not as often as in the past: they were initially of a predominantly Highland background, continue to share support for the Westminster Confession of Faith, and express a socially conservative outlook. However, the Free Presbyterian Church considers it a sin to use public transport to go to church on the Sabbath, while the Free Church does not. The Free Church permits the use of modern Bible translations, while the Free Presbyterian Church prescribes the exclusive use of the Authorized Version in public worship (by resolution of the Synod in 1961), and as the only version recommended for use in family and private devotions.

=== Split in 1989 ===
In 1989, a splinter group formed the Associated Presbyterian Churches "following the perceived failure of the Free Presbyterian Church of Scotland to put into practice chapters 20 and 26 of the Westminster Confession of Faith", following the suspension of Lord Advocate and Lord Chancellor Lord Mackay of Clashfern as an elder for attending the Roman Catholic Requiem Masses offered for two of his deceased fellow judges. The Moderator of Synod at the time was a minister from Zimbabwe, the late Aaron Ndebele, an Ndebele.

The FPC continues to oppose many aspects of the Catholic Church, including Mass, and has protested from time to time against figures in positions of authority including the British royal family attending Mass. It wrote to Prince Charles to complain of his presence at a requiem mass for one of his cousins in 2013. The church maintains that the Pope is the Antichrist.

=== Disunity in the Scottish Reformed church scene ===
The Free Presbyterians believe that the denominations in Scotland adhering to the Westminster Confession of Faith should unite with it after repentance over historical retreat from the Confession. The FPC Catechism (the 2013 edition is an updated version of the original 1942–1943 edition) says: "All Presbyterian Churches in Scotland claiming to represent the Reformed Church and who have caused or who maintain schisms contrary to the avowed Westminster Standards are bound to repent and to return to purity in doctrine, worship, government and discipline. The Free Presbyterian Church of Scotland is not guilty of schism and claims to be the true heir of the Reformed Church of Scotland in doctrine, worship, government and discipline. While she certainly does not claim perfection, she maintains that all churches in Scotland should unite around her constitution and testimony".

== Twenty-first century developments ==
Church extension work tends to be low-key, and results are measured in the long term in the Free Presbyterian Church. It stresses the need for the Holy Spirit to work in the soul before any spiritual life will be present, the need for the church to provide Bible-based and Christ-focused preaching, emphasizes the need for a holy life by those who claim conversion, and encourages example as well as precept in evangelism. It has not emulated other evangelical churches' approach to reaching the secular UK. Its Catechism explains: "Many modern churches have drama, dancing, and music bands in their worship and use sport and social entertainment to attract and retain young people; but these things are of the world and should not be countenanced by the Church of Christ for promoting the interests of the kingdom".

Public pronouncements about the current state of the nation tend to combine concern about Free Presbyterian spiritual decline with fears of increased secularization of other Reformed churches. A 2014 report to the FP Religion and Morals Committee quoted from a FP Outer Isles presbytery report, but said the issues were relevant for many other parts of the country. "We must acknowledge the low state of religion among ourselves" it said, adding of other denominations: "...we find that many professing Christians in the Churches are actively encouraged to continue their former worldly interest in professional and amateur sport, worldly music, entertainments such as the cinema, dances, use of public houses, concerts and ceilidhs, and that many speak and dress like the world with little distinction to be found between them and their former companions".

== Moderators of Synod ==
Unlike the Church of Scotland and Free Church of Scotland, the annual meeting to consider the progress and direction of the church is called a Synod rather than a General Assembly. Synods are not in any particular fixed months (and may occur more than once per year) and ministers may serve as Moderator more than once. Known Moderators are:

- Alexander MacColl MacRae (1896)
- George Mackay (1899)
- Neil MacIntyre (1902)
- John Robertson (1902)
- John Robertson (1903)
- John Macleod (1904)
- John Macleod (1905)
- Donald Beaton (1905)
- Ewen MacQueen (1907)
- John Robertson Mackay (1907)
- John Robertson Mackay (1908)
- Neil Cameron (1908)
- Neil Cameron (1909)
- Neil MacIntyre (1912)
- Andrew Sutherland (1914)
- Alexander MacKay (1916)
- Donald Macfarlane (1917)
- Murdo Morrison (1918)
- Donald Macfarlane (1920)
- Neil Cameron (1921)
- Malcolm Gillies (1922)
- James Macleod (1923)
- Donald Alexander Macfarlane (1925)
- Neil MacIntyre (1925)
- Donald Malcolm Macdonald (1926)
- Roderick Mackenzie (1927)
- Ewen MacQueen (1928)
- John Maclachlan (1929)
- Finlay Macleod (1930)
- William Grant (1931)
- Donald John Matheson (1932)
- Ewen MacQueen (1933)
- John Tallach (1933)
- James Andrew Tallach (1934)
- James Macleod (1935)
- James Macleod (1936)
- Roderick Macdonald (1937)
- Donald Beaton (1938)
- John Colquhoun (1939)
- Donald Roderick Macdonald (1940)
- Neil MacIntyre (1941)
- Archibald Beaton (1942)
- John Peter MacQueen (1943)
- James Andrew Tallach (1944)
- Angus Finlay Mackay (1945)
- Donald Alexander Macfarlane (1946)
- John Tallach (1947)
- Alexander Macaskill (1948)
- Malcolm MacSween (1949)
- John Angus MacDonald (1950)
- Donald John Macaskill (1951)
- William Maclean (1952)
- Donald Campbell (1953)
- James Macleod (1954)
- Archibald Beaton (1955)
- Fraser MacDonald (1956)
- James Andrew Tallach (1957)
- Donald MacLean (1958)
- William Grant (1959)
- Angus Mackay (1961)
- John Colquhoun (1962)
- Petros Mzamo (1963) (first black Moderator)
- Lachlan Macleod (1964)
- Donald Malcolm MacLeod (1965)
- Angus Cattanach (1966)
- Donald Alexander Maclean (1967)
- Angus Finlay Mackay (1969)
- Robert Ross Sinclair (1970)
- Alexander Morrison (1971)
- John Angus MacDonald (1972)
- Donald Beaton Macleod (1973)
- Donald Campbell (1974)
- John Nicolson (1975)
- Fraser MacDonald (1976)
- Alexander McPherson (1977)
- Donald Macleod Campbell (1979)
- Angus Mackay (1980)
- Donald Nicolson (1981)
- Alexander McPherson (1982)
- John Macdonald (1983)
- Angus Finlay Mackay (1984)
- Donald Beaton Macleod (1986)
- Samuel Fraser Tallach (1987)
- Aaron Ndebele (1988)
- Lachlan Macleod (1989)
- Donald John Macdonald (1990)
- Donald MacLean (1992)
- Donald MacLean (1993)
- Alexander McPherson (1995)
- Kenneth D Macleod (2000)
- Donald John Macdonald (2001)
- John Goldby (2002)
- Hugh MacLean Cartwright (2003)
- Roderick MacLeod (2004)
- Neil M Ross (2005)
- Keith M Watkins (2006)
- Donald A Ross (2007)
- Wilfred A Weale (2008)
- George G Hutton (2009)
- Edward A Rayner (2010)
- Kenneth D Macleod (2011)
- David Campbell (2012)
- Neil M Ross (2013)
- D Macdonald (2014)
- Keith M Watkins (2015)
- Douglas W.B Somerset (2016)
- John MacLeod (2017)
- Allan W MacColl (2018)
- Roderick MacLeod (2019)
- J Bruce Jardine (2020)
- James R Tallach (2021)
- Donald A Ross (2022)
- Sipho Khumalo (2023)
- Wilfred A Weale (2024)
- George B Macdonald (2025)

== Presbyteries ==
The individual churches of the Free Presbyterian Church of Scotland are each part of one of six Presbyteries. Presbyteries meet regularly, and all Presbyteries meet at the yearly Synod in May.

=== Asia Pacific Presbytery ===
The Asia Pacific Presbytery covers Australia, New Zealand and Singapore, comprising seven congregations.

The congregations in Australia are found on the East Coast: one in Grafton (received 1911), and one in Sydney. The congregations in New Zealand are all on the North Island: Auckland, Gisborne (founded 1954), Tauranga, and Carterton. There is also one congregation in Singapore (received 2000).

=== Northern Presbytery ===
The Northern Presbytery comprises seven congregations in the North of Scotland.

The congregations are: Aberdeen; Dingwall & Beauly; Dornoch & Bonar; Farr, Tomatin & Stratherrick; Inverness; Kinlochbervie & Scourie, and Halkirk, Thurso & Strathy.

=== Outer Isles Presbytery ===
The Outer Isles Presbytery consists of the seven congregations on the Outer Hebrides.

The congregations are: North Harris (meeting in Tarbert and Stockinish); South Harris (meeting at Leverburgh and Sheilebost); Ness; North Tolsta; North Uist (meeting in Sollas), Stornoway and Achmore; and Uig (meeting at Miavaig).

=== Southern Presbytery ===
The Southern Presbytery consists of the Scottish congregations which are mostly south of the Scottish Highlands, and the congregations in England and North America - comprising nine congregations in total. In Scotland, the Southern Presbytery congregations are Perth, Edinburgh, St Jude's in Glasgow, Fort William and Greenock. In England, there is one congregation in London (founded 1898), a congregation at Broadstairs , as well as the Barnoldswick and South Manchester congregation

In North America, there is one congregation in Canada, in Chesley, Ontario (founded 1902) and one congregation, in Santa Fe, Texas (received 2000).

=== Western Presbytery ===
The Western Presbytery consists of the Western parts of Scotland including Skye, but also the congregation in Odesa, in Ukraine (received 2002). In total, there are 11 congregations in the Presbytery.

The Scottish congregations: Duirinish & Bracadale (meeting in Struan, Glendale and Vatten); Gairloch & Strath; Kyle of Lochalsh; Laide; Lochcarron; Lochinver (although, there are currently no services at present); Portree; Shieldaig & Applecross; Staffin and Ullapool

=== Zimbabwe Presbytery ===
In Zimbabwe services are held in forty locations with their centres in Bulawayo, Ingwenya, Mbuma, New Canaan and Zenka. The Zimbabwe mission began in 1904.

== List of congregations ==
Congregation	Location(s)	Presbytery	Minister	Image	Founded
Aberdeen	Aberdeen	Northern	Rev. D Somerset		1963
Bracadale (Strath/Struan) linked with Duirinish (Glendale/Vatten)	Struan, Vatten, and Glendale, Highland	Western	Vacant		
Barnoldswick	Barnoldswick, Lancashire and Sandbach, Cheshire Cheadle and Gatley, Greater Manchester	Southern	Vacant		
Broadstairs	Broadstairs, Kent	Southern	Vacant		
Chelsey	Chelsey, Ontario	Southern	Vacant		1902
Dingwall and Beauly	Dingwall and Beauly, Highland	Northern	Rev. A W. MacColl		
Dornoch & Bonar Bridge	Bonar Bridge and Dornoch, Highland	Northern	Rev. John A. Morrison		
Edinburgh	Edinburgh, Edinburgh	Southern	Rev. D Campbell		1893
Farr (Daviot), Tomatin and Statherrick	Farr, Tomatin and Stratherrick, Highland	Northern	Vacant		
Fort William	Fort William, Highland	Southern	Vacant		
Gairloch & Strath	Gairloch, Highland &	Western	Vacant		
Glasgow (St Jude's Church)	Glasgow	Southern	Rev. R. MacLeod		1893
Grafton	Grafton, New South Wales	Asia Pacific	Rev. G.G. Hutton		
Greenock	Greenock, Inverclyde	Southern	Vacant		
Halkirk	Halkirk, Thurso and Strathy, Highland	Northern	Rev. W.A.Weale		
Inverness	Inverness, Highland	Northern	Rev. K.D. Macleod		1893
Kinlochbervie and Scourie	Kinlochbervie and Scourie, Highland	Northern	Vacant		
Kyle of Lochalsh	Kyle of Lochalsh	Western	Vacant		
Laide	Laide, Highland	Western	Rev. D.A. Ross		
Lochcarron	Lochcarron, Highland	Western	Vacant		
Lochinver	Lochinver	Western	Vacant [No services]		
London	Whitechapel, London	Southern	Vacant		1898
Ness	Ness, Na h-Eileanan Siar	Outer Isles	Vacant		
North Harris (Tarbert)	Tarbert and Stocinis, Na h-Eileanan Siar	Outer Isles	Rev. J.B. Jardine		
North Tolsta	North Tolsta, Na h-Eileanan Siar	Outer Isles	Vacant		
North Uist	Bayhead, Na h-Eileanan Siar	Outer Isles	Vacant		1893
Odesa	Odesa, Ukraine	Western	Rev. D. Levytski		(Joined in 2002)
Perth	Perth, Perth and Kinross	Southern	Vacant		
Portree	Portree, Highland	Western	Rev. I.D. MacDonald		
Santa Fe	Santa Fe, Texas	Southern	Vacant		(Joined in 2000)
Shieldaig & Applecross	Applecross and Shieldaig, Highland	Western	Vacant		
Singapore	Singapore	Asia Pacific	Vacant		
South Harris (Leverburgh)	Leverburgh and Sheilebost, Na h-Eileanan Siar	Outer Isles	Rev. K. M. Watkins		
Staffin	Staffin, Highland	Western	Vacant		
Stornoway	Stornoway and Achmore, Na h-Eileanan Siar	Outer Isles	Vacant		c. 1893
Sydney	Sydney	Asia Pacific	Rev. G.B. Macdonald		
Tauranga	Tauranga, New Zealand	Asia Pacific	Vacant		
Uig	Uig, Na h-Eileanan Siar	Outer Isles	Vacant		
Ullapool	Ullapool, Highland	Western	Vacant		1894 (Ullapool)
Zenka	Zimbabwe	Zimbabwe			

== Churches in 1893 ==
The following congregations of the Free Church are listed in Ewing's Annals of the Free Church of Scotland as having been involved in the secession of 1893 which led to the formation of the Free Presbyterian Church:

- Carloway ("some families at Breasclet")
- Dingwall ("a small section of the people") → there is still a congregation of Dingwall and Beauly
- Eddrachillis ("a number")
- Farr ("a few")
- Glasgow: Tradeston Gaelic ("some members")
- Greenock: Gaelic ("about sixty persons")
- Halkirk ("about forty persons")
- Kilfinnan, Argyll ("a number of members seceded, and formed the Free Presbyterian congregation") (see Kames below)
- Kilmorack or Beauly ("about a hundred adherents left the congregation, to form the Free Presbyterian Church.")
- Kinlochbervie ("a small section")
- Lochbroom ("a number")
- Lochcarron ("fully a third of the congregation")
- Partick: Gaelic ("a considerable number")
- Portree ("several members")
- Shieldaig and Torridon ("most of the Shieldaig people") → there is still a congregation of Applecross and Shieldaig, with buildings in both villages.
- Stornoway ("some hundreds")
- Stratherrick ("the Duff party and their descendants")

== Church developments since the 1890s ==
=== Northern Presbytery ===
- 1. Aberdeen: Regular Sunday services began in 1968. A mission station was formed in 1970 (in which year a small place of worship was purchased), a sanctioned charge in 1971, and a Church Extension charge in 2005. Church and manse were taken by those who seceded to the APC in 1989 and only recovered by the FPC in 2000.
  - Ministers: [1] E. A. Rayner (1972-76). [2] John A. Tallach (1979-89; left for APC; joined CoS 1999). [3] Douglas W. B. Somerset (2005-).
- 2. Bonar & Dornoch: Stations at Dornoch, Lairg, Rogart and Creich (Bonar Bridge) were recorded in 1898. An iron church was erected at Dornoch in 1902. The four stations were erected into a charge in 1902. They were separated into two in the 1920s and reunited in the 1990s, also taking in Tain and Fearn. At Tain station the former United Presbyterian church was purchased in 1903. At Fearn station, a stone meeting-house was completed in 1896. These two became a regular charge in 1903. The current charge worships in Dornoch and Bonar only, the churches in Tain, Fearn, Lairg and Rogart being unused.
  - Ministers of Dornoch, Lairg, Rogart and Bonar Bridge: [1] Ewen Macqueen (1903-12). [2] Donald A. Macfarlane (1914-21).
  - Ministers of Dornoch and Rogart: [1] Finlay Macleod (1926-d. 1956). [2] Alexander McPherson (1961-67).
  - Ministers of Lairg and Bonar Bridge: [1] Donald J. Matheson (1926-46). [2] Donald M. Macleod (1956-61). [3] Donald B. Macleod (1971-76). [4] Alexander Murray (1984-89; left for APC).
  - Ministers of Tain and Fearn: [1] Dugald S. Cameron (1904-06; joined Free Church). [2] John Nicolson (1971-d. 1977). [3] John Ross (left for APC 1989).
  - Ministers of Dornoch, Bonar Bridge, Lairg, Rogart, Tain and Fearn: [1] Donald J. MacDonald (1996-2008). [2] John A. Morrison (present).
- 3. Farr & Daviot (Farr, Tomatin and Stratherrick): Stations at Daviot, Stratherrick and Kilmorack were recorded from 1899. A church is at Farr.
  - Minister: Donald J. Matheson (1960-d. 1962). Alexander McPherson (1967-79). A. J. MacDonald (2001-). Currently vacant.
- 4. Dingwall and Beauly: A station at Dingwall was recorded in 1898. At Beauly a station existed from 1896, and rented a meeting-house. Dingwall and Beauly were erected into a regular charge in 1898. This was changed to just Dingwall in 1900.
  - Ministers: [1] Donald MacFarlane (1903-d. 1926). [2] Donald A. MacFarlane (1930-73). [3] Donald B. Macleod (1976-91). Neil M. Ross (2001). Minister 2025: Allan W. MacColl.
- 5. Halkirk (Halkirk, Thurso and Strathy): The Halkirk mission station existed in 1897 when a new church was opened. A station at Helmsdale was recorded in 1898. Halkirk and Helmsdale became a regular charge in 1901. A station at Strathy was recorded in 1898. In 1898 it was recorded that at Thurso occasional services were held; it was a station by 1903. The Wick, Lybster and Keiss mission stations existed in 1897. They were erected into a charge in 1901. The Wick church closed in the 1990s and was united with Halkirk. Services are currently held in Halkirk, Thurso and Strathy.
  - Ministers of Halkirk: [1] Dugald S. Cameron (1901-04). [2] Norman Matheson (1906-20; left for Free Church). [3] Malcolm Gillies (1921-25). [4] William Grant (1926-64). [5] Donald A. Maclean (1965-82; joined Church of Scotland). Current: Wilfred A. Weale.
  - Ministers of Wick: [1] Donald Beaton (1901-30). [2] Robert R. Sinclair (1931-89; left for APC).
- 6. Inverness. The congregation was formed soon after 1893. A church in Fraser Street was purchased in 1896, but this was lost when the minister and half the membership left in 1897 to become independent. The remainder met in the Drill Hall until a new church in North Church Place was built in 1900. The third minister left to found an independent church, which he led until his death in 1949. It was led next by Alexander D. Macleod (see below) (1950-55), who departed for the Church of Scotland. The church bought in 1951 the former St Mary's Gaelic Chapel. Half the church, retaining the building, became Greyfriars Free Church in 1958. There was no minister from 1955 until the church was dissolved in 1980.
  - Ministers: [1] Allan Mackenzie (pre-1896-97). [2] John R. Mackay (1900-18; left for Free Church). [3] Ewen Macqueen (1919-38). [4] Angus F. Mackay (1947-87). Donald M. Boyd (-2000; suspended; deposed 2003). George G. Hutton (2001). Current: Kenneth D. Macleod.
- 7. Kinlochbervie and Scourie. A station at Kinlochbervie was recorded in 1898. In the 1960s a church was bought and renovated. At Scourie occasional services were held in 1898. It was a station by 1903. In 1970 the original wood and tin building was renovated.
  - Ministers: Donald B. Macleod (1960-62). Samuel F. Tallach (1980-89; left for APC). Currently vacant.
- In the early days (1890s/1900s) mission stations were recorded at the following additional locations: Alness, Aviemore, Dunbeath, Duthil/Carrbridge, Fraserburgh and Peterhead (summer services for fishermen), Golspie, Kingussie, Moy, Newtonmore, Resolis, Strathpeffer.

=== Southern Presbytery ===
- 8. Barnoldswick (England). Had joined by 2000. Vacant 2001.
- 9. Chesley, Canada. In Canada a mission was established in 1902 at the request of those who had separated from the Presbyterian churches there. In 1903 there were five stations, at Brucefield, East Williams, Kincardine, Lochalsh and Newton, all near the east coast of Lake Huron.
  - Ministers in Canada / to Canadian Mission: Walter Scott (1912-d. 1916). Malcolm Gillies (1920-21). James A. Tallach (1926-28).
  - Ministers of Chesley: Donald M. Campbell (1982-87; deposed). Began after 1970. Vacant 2001. Still extant.
  - Ministers of Ontario: William Matheson (1918-30; left for Free Presbyterian Church of Ontario). Closed by 1970.
  - Ministers of Toronto: Calum Macinnes (left for APC 1989). Began after 1970. Closed before 2001.
  - Ministers of Vancouver: Roderick Macdonald (1951-d. 1974). Douglas B. Beattie (1976-89; seceded to APC.) Closed after 2001.
  - Ministers of Winnipeg: Alexander Murray (1954-56). Closed before 2001.
- 10. Edinburgh. The Edinburgh congregation was formed soon after 1893. It became a regular/sanctioned charge in 1897. In 1898 it met at 20 Chambers Street. A building at East Fountainbridge (formerly an Evangelical Union church) was purchased in 1904, but this was lost when the minister and most of the membership joined the Free Church in 1905. Those who remained in the FPC purchased a building in Gilmore Place in 1921 in which worship continues to this day.
  - Ministers: [1] Alexander Stewart (1903-05; left for Free Church). [2] Neil Macintyre (1923-50). [3] Donald Campbell (1951-d. 1983). [4] Angus Morrison (1986-89; left for APC). [5] Donald B. Macleod (1991-d. 1995). [6] Hugh M. Cartwright (1998-d. 2011; joined from Free Church). Minister 2019 on: David Campbell.
- 11. Perth (Perth, Dundee and Stirling Extension Charge). Aberfeldy was a preaching station under the Edinburgh congregation. Services were held in the Town Hall from 1961 to 1974, at which point Aberfeldy was transferred to the newly formed charge of Dundee, Perth, and Stirling.
  - Ministers of Perth: [1] Ian R. Tallach (1973-d. 1979). [2] Donald J. MacDonald (1979-89). [3] Alexander McPherson (1992-d. 2000). Alasdair B. Maclean (2020-d. 2023).
  - Minister of Dundee: Donald Macaskill (left for APC 1989). No services have been held since.
- 12. Fort William and Oban. A station at Fort William was recorded in 1898. Church and manse were taken by those who seceded to the APC in 1989 and only restored to the FPC in 2000. The Oban station existed in 1896; its new stone church was opened that year. The Oban church and manse are not used at present.
  - Minister of Fort William: John A. MacDonald (1960-88).
  - Ministers of Oban: [1] Alexander Stewart (1898-1903). [2] Alexander MacKay (1912-21; deposed). [3] Donald A. Macfarlane (1921-30). [4] Donald Beaton (1930-48). [5] John Tallach (1949-d. 1955). [6] Malcolm MacSween (1956-d. 1978). [7] Angus Morrison (1979-86). [8] Hamish I. Mackinnon (left for APC 1989; readmitted 2000).
- 13. Glasgow. The congregation was formed in 1893. A building (St Jude's) which had previously belonged to an Episcopalian church was rented, then purchased in 1902, and used until 1975, when a new building was acquired. John Knox's Tabernacle, a Glasgow church which had separated from the Free Church in 1852, was accepted into the FPC in 1895, having been at that point 36 years without a minister. It met at 137 Norfolk Street, but used neighbouring churches for communion services. From 1904 it met at the Christian Institute. It lasted until 1921 when it was absorbed into the St Jude's congregation. The Kames, Kilfinnan or Tighnabruaich congregation was the first to join the FPC, on Monday 29th May 1893, its ruling elders taking the bold step of separating from the Free Church at a point when only one minister had done so. They were evicted from their building in Millhouse by the Free Church in 1894. An iron church in Kames was built later that year. Services were held in Gaelic until the 1940s/50s. It was reduced to a preaching station under Glasgow in 1994 and closed in 1997. The building was converted to a house. A station at Tarbert (Loch Fyne) was recorded in 1898. A station at Lochgilphead was recorded in 1898. A church was built in 1904. A minister was never called. Services ceased in 1973 and the building was sold. Clydebank was also a preaching station under the Glasgow congregation from 1896-1950. The church was destroyed by bombing in 1941, after which the congregation mostly joined the newly built Dumbarton church. A station at Dumbarton was recorded in 1898; a church was built but has since closed.
  - Ministers of St Jude's: [1] Neil Cameron (1896-d. 1932). John Robertson (assistant/retired minister, 1900-d. 1914). [2] Roderick Mackenzie II (1932-44). (Seceded from the FPC in 1945, carrying with him a number of his own congregation and others elsewhere in Scotland.) [3] Donald J. Matheson (1946-60). [4] Donald MacLean (1960-2000). [5] Roderick MacLeod (2001-present).
  - Ministers of Knox's Tabernacle: [1] James S. Sinclair (1896-d. 1921).
  - Ministers of Kames: [1] Alexander M. Macrae (1894-99). [2] John Macleod (1901-05; joined Free Church). [3] Ewen Macqueen (1912-19). [4] Duncan Mackenzie (1921-d. 1930). [5] James A. Tallach (1931-52). Donald A. MacDonald (1969-75; joined from Free Church).
  - Ministers of Tarbert (Loch Fyne): [1] Donald R. MacDonald (1927-51).
  - Ministers of Dumbarton: [1] John M. Brentnall (1976-81; ejected). [2] George Macaskill (left for APC 1989).
- 14. Greenock. A station at Greenock existed by 1896. Services are still held, in a hall belonging to the Free Church. Greenock is now a preaching station under Glasgow.
  - Ministers of Greenock: [1] James Macleod (1932-d. 1963). [2] Lachlan Macleod (1965-93).
- 15. London and Broadstairs. Regular Sunday services in London began in 1908. The mission station became a sanctioned charge in 1927. There have been several meeting places; in 1974 a chapel, formerly belonging to the Gospel Standard Strict Baptists, was purchased. Sunday evening services commenced in Broadstairs 2003.
  - Ministers: [1] John P. MacQueen (1936-d. 1961). [2] Donald B. Macleod (1962-71). [3] Alexander McPherson (1979-92). Vacant 2025.
- 16. Santa Fe, Texas. A church in Richmond, Texas, joined 2000. There is now a church in Santa Fe (vacant).
- In the early days (1890s/1900s) mission stations were recorded at the following additional locations: Ballachulish (North), Kilmallie

=== Outer Isles Presbytery ===
- 17. Ness. A station was recorded at Ness in 1898.
  - Ministers: [1] Missionary (1941-48) and minister (1948-62, 1976-d. 1985): William Maclean. [2] John Nicolson (1962-71). A. W. MacColl (2019). Vacant 2025.
- 18. North Harris. The Harris congregation existed by 1896. A stone church was built at Tarbert station c. 1897. There were also stations at Kyles Stockinish and Kyles Scalpay in the north, and at Finsbay, Stronde and Obbe in the south. Harris became a charge in 1901. Ministers: [1] Ewen Macqueen (1901-03). Donald N. Macleod (1911-24).
  - Ministers of North Harris (Tarbert): Angus Mackay (1953-85). Roderick Macleod (-2001). Current: J. Bruce Jardine.
  - Ministers of South Harris: Donald J. Macaskill (1934-48). Angus M. Cattanach (1955-79). Duncan Maclean (1979-85; suspended). Missionary: Donald MacDonald II (1983-2000). K. D. Macleod (2001). Current: Keith M. Watkins.
- 19. South Harris
- 20. North Tolsta. Isle of Lewis. Stations were recorded at Back and Breasclete from 1898.
  - Ministers: [1] Fraser MacDonald (1952-66). [2] Donald Nicolson (1967-69; joined from Free Church). [3] Duncan Maclean (1972-79). [4] John MacDonald (1981-91). [5] David Campbell (2002-). Vacant 2025.
- 21. North Uist. The North Uist congregation was formed in 1893. By 1898 there were stations at Paible, Claddach Kyles and Claddach Kirkibost. In 1903 there was a station on Grimsay. A station on South Uist was recorded in 1898.
  - Ministers: [1] Donald M. MacDonald (1916-19). [2] John Maclachlan (1923-d. 1933). [3] Wallace B. Nicolson (1939-45; left for Free Church). [4] Donald J. Macaskill (1948-55). [5] Alexander Morrison (1959-d. 1999). [6] Missionary (2000-04) and minister (2005-17): Donald MacDonald II. Vacant 2025.
- 22. Stornoway & Achmore. The Stornoway congregation was formed in 1893. The church was opened in 1899. Services were held in both Gaelic and English until 1997. In 1903 the charge also covered stations at Achmore and Leurbost. Services were still held in Achmore in 2019.
  - Ministers: [1] George Mackay (1898-1905; left for Free Church). [2] Neil Macintyre (1908-23). [3] Malcolm Gillies (1925-d. 1945). [4] Donald Campbell (1947-51). [5] James A. Tallach (1952-d. 1960). [6] Donald M. Macleod (1961-68). J. R. Tallach (2019). Vacant 2025.
- 23. Uig (Lewis) or Miavaig.
  - Ministers: Roderick Macinnes (1931-36; joined from Church of Scotland). John A. MacDonald (1939-47). Lachlan Macleod (1953-65). Donald J. Macaskill (1965-74). Donald Maclennan (1975-81; joined Church of Scotland 1986). Donald J. MacDonald (1989-96). Vacant 2025.

=== Western Presbytery ===
The Western Presbytery consists of the Western parts of Scotland including Skye, but also the congregation in Odesa, in Ukraine (received 2002). In total, there are 11 congregations in the Presbytery.

- 24. Duirinish & Bracadale. In the parish of Duirinish there were three stations, at Glendale, Vatten and Waternish, by 1898. At Glendale a church had been erected by 1896. At Bracadale there was a station from 1896. Later ministers served at Portnalong. At Broadford there was a station from 1898, also holding meetings at Elgol. The current linked charge of Duirinish & Bracadale currently has three places of worship at Glendale, Struan and Vatten.
  - Ministers of Glendale: [1] Neil Macintyre (1899-1908). [2] Murdo Morrison (1909-13). [3] James Macleod (1920-32). [4] John Colquhoun (1933-74). [5] Donald Nicolson (1978-92).
  - Ministers of Portnalong: [1] Malcolm MacSween (1942-56). [2] Donald A. Maclean (1957-65). [3] Donald J. MacDonald (1970-79).
  - Ministers of Broadford: [1] Samuel F. Tallach (1971-80).
- 25. Gairloch and Strath: The Gairloch congregation. By 1896 meeting-houses had been erected at Melvaig, Port Henderson and Inverasdale. In 1898 and 1903 it was recorded that the Gairloch congregation embraced Aultbea. A stone church in Gairloch was opened in 1897.
  - Ministers: [1] John R. Mackay (1893-1900). [2] Duncan Mackenzie (1906-21). [3] Roderick Mackenzie II (1923-32). [4] Archibald Beaton (1933-d. 1960). [5] Alfred E. W. MacDonald (1965-2021). Currently vacant.
- 26. Kyle of Lochalsh
  - A station was recorded at Plockton in 1898. Minister of Plockton: Douglas B. Beattie (1972-76).
- 27. Laide: (near Gairloch). Current minister: Donald A. Ross.
- 28. Lochcarron:
- 29. Lochinver: (See Ullapool)
- 30. Odessa mission station. Current minister: Dmytro Levytskyi. Services held by 2000.
- 31. Portree: The Portree congregation at first met in a hall; a new church was built in 1896. Ministers: [1] Roderick Mackenzie (1896-98; left for Church of Scotland). [2] Alexander M. Macrae (1899-1918; left for Free Church). [3] Donald M. MacDonald (1919-48). [4] Donald MacLean (1948-60). [5] Fraser MacDonald (1966-2006). Minister 2019-: Iain D. MacDonald.
- 32. Shieldaig & Applecross: The Shieldaig congregation was formed in 1893, their minister, Donald Macdonald, leaving the Free Church along with Donald MacFarlane. They at first met in a house; the stone church was opened 1896. A station was recorded at Lochcarron in 1898. Meetings were also held at Kishorn, where a meeting-house was in use in 1896. At Applecross station an iron church was built c. 1897. Applecross, Lochcarron and Plockton were sanctioned as a regular charge in 1899, but do not appear to have called a minister. Applecross was a regular charge from 1935. Shieldaig was a joint charge with Lochcarron from c. 1905-50. In the 1990s Shieldaig was united with Applecross.
  - Minister of Shieldaig: [1] Donald Macdonald (1893-d. 1901).
  - Ministers of Shieldaig and Lochcarron: [1] Donald Graham (1905-d. 1927). [2] Donald Macleod (1928-d. 1937). [3] Alexander D. Macleod (1939-45; seceded over Roderick Mackenzie case).
  - Ministers of Lochcarron: [1] Donald J. Macaskill (1955-61). [2] John W. Ross (1969-89; left for APC). Services are still held.
  - Ministers of Shieldaig: [1] Donald R. MacDonald (1951-d. 1963). [2] Donald M. Campbell (1976-82).
  - Ministers of Applecross: [1] Angus F. Mackay (1935-47). [2] John A. MacDonald (1947-54). [3] Alexander Murray (1956-84). [4] P. Lloyd Roberts (left for APC 1989).
  - Shieldaig and Applecross: none.
- 33. Staffin: A station was recorded at Staffin in 1902, but it is not on the list in 1903.
  - Ministers: John Martin (1960-d. 1964). John MacDonald (1969-81). Donald Maclennan (1981-86; left for Church of Scotland). Angus M. Cattanach (1988-93; seceded to APC). ? (-2000). Wilfred A. Weale (2001-; joined from Free Church). Donald MacDonald II (2017-d. 2019). John Campbell (2022-d. 2023).
- 34. Ullapool: The Lochbroom charge was formed in 1894, with meetings in Ullapool, Coigach and Scoraig. An iron church was erected in Ullapool by 1896. The Coigach and Scoraig congregations closed in the 1960s. Assynt: In 1898 there were stations at both Lochinver and Stoer. A church in Lochinver was built c. 1896. At Stoer the congregation met in a schoolroom, but were seeking to build a church in 1900. In 1994 the Ullapool and Lochinver congregations were united. Services ceased to be held in Lochinver in 2012; they are still held in Ullapool.
  - Ministers of Ullapool: [1] John Macleod (1897-1901). [2] Andrew Sutherland (1910-18; left for Free Church). [3] Donald N. Macleod (1924-d. 1967).
  - Ministers of Lochinver: Missionary: Donald Graham (1899-1902). [1] Murdo Morrison (1913-34). [2] Alexander Macaskill (1937-d. 1982). [3] Archie McPhail (left for APC 1989).
- A station was recorded at Poolewe in 1898, but it was not on the list in 1903.
- Raasay. The Raasay congregation was formed by Donald MacFarlane (see above) in 1893. For the first five years the landowner refused any site for a church or manse, and MacFarlane had to live in Broadford. A church was eventually built at Holoman and opened in 1899. The present church at Clachan was built in 1929. Services were also held at Rona (until 1920), Fladda (until 1965), and Torran (until 1967).
  - Ministers: [1] Donald MacFarlane (1893-1903). [2] Murdo Morrison (1934-35). [3] Donald Campbell (1942-47). [4] John A. MacDonald (1954-60). [5] Donald J. Macaskill (1961-65). [6] Donald Nicolson (1970-78). [7] James. R. Tallach (1983-).
- In the parish of Snizort, Skye, there was a station at Flashadder from 1896 and at Glenhinishdale from 1898.
- A station on Soay was recorded in 1903.

=== Asia Pacific Presbytery ===
- Australia:
  - Grafton: William Maclean (1973-76). Current minister: George G. Hutton.
  - Sydney. Current minister: George B. MacDonald.
- Fornaci de Barga, Italy. Missionaries visiting from c. 2000.
- Kenya: Sengera Mission. Ordained missionary: Keith. M. Watkins (2001-).
- A station at Kilmuir (Skye) was recorded in 1898.
- Larne (Northern Ireland). Vacant 2001.
- Missionaries to Jews: Donald Urquhart (1928-43). Henry R. M. Radcliff (1970-80; joined from Church of England; suspended.)
- New Zealand:
  - Auckland:
    - Minister: Donald M. Macleod (1968-d. 1978). Current minister: Jett D. Smith.
  - Carterton
  - Gisborne.
    - Minister: William Maclean (1962-73). Johannes van Dorp (1973-2011). Current minister: Caleb Hembd.
  - Tauranga is mentioned in 2003.
- Singapore (Covenant Grace Church). Joined 2000.

=== Zimbabwe Presbytery ===
John B. Radasi, a "Kaffir" Zulu, having completed his theological training in Scotland, was ordained missionary in 1904, to go to the Matabele Zulu in Southern Rhodesia. Ministers in Southern Rhodesia in general: [1] John B. Radasi (1904-d. 1924). John Tallach (1924-47). Roderick Macdonald (1928-48). James S. Fraser (1947-d. 1959)

- Bulawayo. Churches in Lobengula, Nkulumane and Mguza.
  - Ministers: Alfred Mpofu (1982-87). Sipho Khumalo (2003-present).
- Ingwenya.
  - Ministers: Edwin Radasi (1948-53; left to found African Free Presbyterian Church of Zimbabwe). Angus M. Cattanach (1951; recalled after four months). Donald A. Maclean (1953-55; recalled). Alfred E. W. MacDonald (1959-65). Aaron Ndebele (1966-2001). Alasdair B. Maclean (2007-17).
- Mbuma.
  - Ministers: Petros Mzamo (1963-2006). Nopel Sibanda (2013-20).
- New Canaan.
  - Ministers: Zororai Mazvabo (1981-d. 2012). Current: Trycot Mwedzi.
- Zenka.
  - Ministers: Edwin Radasi (1946-48). Donald M. Campbell (1961-72; asked to resign). Bekitemba B. Dube (1978-d. 1991). Manford Mloyi (2003-).

The original Presbytery was split in 1896 into the Southern Presbytery (the areas 'south of the Grampians') and the Northern Presbytery (other congregations).

The Northern Presbytery voted in 1902 to create the Western Presbytery, embracing the 'West Coast and the Islands', leaving the Northern Presbytery with the 'district from Wick to Inverness.'

There are now (2025) presbyteries of Outer Isles, Asia Pacific (formerly Australia & New Zealand), and Zimbabwe. In 2000 a seventh presbytery existed, that of Skye. This had disappeared by 2019.
