= Angus Morrison (minister) =

Minister of the Church of Scotland

The Very Reverend Angus Morrison QHC
- Moderator of the General Assembly
- Church: Church of Scotland (since 2000); Associated Presbyterian Churches (1989 – 2000); Free Presbyterian Church of Scotland (1979 – 1989)
- In office: May 2015 to May 2016
- Predecessor: John Chalmers
- Successor: Russell Barr

Orders
- Ordination: 1979

Personal details
- Born: 1953 (age 72–73) Glen Coe, Scotland
- Denomination: Presbyterianism
- Education: University of Glasgow; New College, Edinburgh

Angus Morrison, QHC (born 1953) is a minister of the Church of Scotland who was Moderator of the General Assembly of the Church of Scotland 2015–2016. He had been nominated for the role a year earlier but withdrew because of ill health. He is an Extra Chaplain to the King in Scotland, appointed in 2023.

== Early life and education ==
Morrison was born in Glencoe, Scotland, in 1953. His father worked for the Northern Lighthouse Board and, as a child, Morrison lived in various places around Scotland and went to school in Oban, Stromness and Edinburgh. He studied Classics and Divinity at the University of Glasgow, followed by studies at the Universities of Pisa and London. He studied for a doctorate (PhD) at New College of the University of Edinburgh.

== Ordained ministry ==
=== Free Presbyterian Church of Scotland and Associated Presbyterian Churches ===
Highly unusually for a Moderator of the General Assembly of the Church of Scotland, Morrison was not ordained by the Church of Scotland. He was ordained by the Free Presbyterian Church of Scotland in 1979. He served as a minister in Oban between 1979 and 1986, and as a minister in Edinburgh between 1986 and 1989. During the latter period, he served as Moderator of the Free Presbyterian Church's Southern Presbytery.

Following a split in the Free Presbyterian Church in 1989 (in the aftermath of the decision of Lord Mackay of Clashfern, who attended Edinburgh Free Presbyterian Church, to attend the Requiem Mass of a colleague), Morrison became one of the founding members and Ministers of the Associated Presbyterian Churches (APC). He became minister of the Edinburgh congregation of the APC, serving from May 1989 to 2000. He was also Moderator of the General Assembly of the APC during the 1998 to 1999 session.

=== Church of Scotland ===
In 2000, Morrison became a minister of the Church of Scotland. He served as minister of St Columba's Old Parish Church, Stornoway, before moving to Orwell and Portmoak Parish Church (in Perth and Kinross) in 2011. Within the Church of Scotland he served as the Moderator of the Presbytery of Lewis for the 2003 to 2004 session, Convener of the Mission and Discipleship Council (2005-2009) and Chaplain to the Lord High Commissioner (2005 and 2006).

On 29 October 2013 he was nominated to be Moderator of the General Assembly of the Church of Scotland for 2014–15. In March 2014, two months before he was due to take up the role, the Church of Scotland announced that Morrison had withdrawn his nomination as Moderator on grounds of ill health. He is the first moderator-designate who is known to have stood down. Following this, John Chalmers (Principal Clerk to the General Assembly) was selected to be Moderator ahead of the 2014–15 session. On 28 October 2014, following successful surgery, Morrison was again successfully nominated to be Moderator of the General Assembly of the Church of Scotland, for 2015–16.

He became Moderator at the beginning of the General Assembly in May 2015. He was one of a few Gaelic speaking Moderators since the reunification of the Church of Scotland and United Free in 1929 - including Lauchlan Watt (1933), Dugald MacFarlane (1937), Alexander McDonald (1948), Thomas Murchison (1969) and James Matheson (1975).

His year of Moderator involved him opening the Royal National Mod in Oban and visiting the Scottish Parliament. He went on Presbytery visits to Argyll and Lochaber. He also made history as the first representative of the Church of Scotland to address the General Synod. His address contributed towards the passing of the Columba Declaration, which is a historic formal recognition of the relationship between both churches.

He retired from his charge of Orwell and Portmoak Parish Church on 30 September 2021. His final Sunday worship service at Orwell and Portmoak was on 26 September 2021. He now lives in Edinburgh.

Morrison was appointed a Chaplain to Queen Elizabeth II in Scotland in 2006. He was appointed an Extra Chaplain to King Charles III in Scotland in September 2023.

== Personal life ==
He can speak Gaelic and Italian as well as English. He is married to Marion, and together they have four children.

On 26 June 2018, he received an Honorary Degree from the University of Glasgow, and, during his address at the ceremony, he became the first person in the history of University of Glasgow's 561 years to address the graduation audience in both English and Gaelic.

Religious titles
| Preceded by John Chalmers | Moderator of the General Assembly of the Church of Scotland; 2015-2016 | Succeeded by Russell Barr |
