= James Matheson (disambiguation) =

James Matheson (1796–1878) was a Scottish trader in India.

James Matheson may also refer to:

- James Matheson (skier) (born 1995), Australian freestyle skier
- James Matheson (composer) (born 1970), American composer
- James Gunn Matheson (1912–2007), Scottish minister
- Jim Matheson (born 1960), American politician
- Jim Matheson (journalist) (born 1949), Canadian sports journalist

== See also ==
- James Mathison (born 1978), Australian television presenter
