= Mbuma Mission Hospital =

- Free Presbyterian Church of Scotland
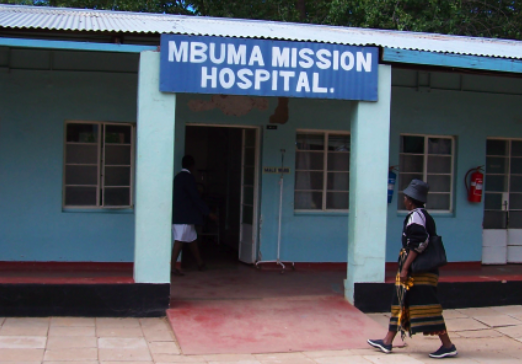

Geography
- Location: Mbuma, Nkayi District, Matabeleland North (province), Zimbabwe
- Coordinates: 18.939986°S 28.442103°E

Organisation
- Care system: Private
- Type: Community

Services
- Emergency department: by staff (24/7)
- Beds: 100

History
- Opened: 1957

Links
- Lists: Hospitals in Zimbabwe
- Other links: Mission Hospital

Coordinates: 18°56′S 28°27′E

Mbuma Mission Hospital is a community hospital in Mbuma, which is a remote village within Nkayi District, Matabeleland North (province), Zimbabwe. It is owned and operated by the Free Presbyterian Church of Scotland and largely funded by the Dutch 'Mbuma Mission Foundation' (Mbuma-Zending). The hospital compound is close to the Shangani river, about 1157 metres above sea level.

== Mission history ==
The Free Presbyterian Church of Scotland has been working in Matabeleland for over a hundred years. The first missionary was John Boyana Radasi, originally from Transkei, South Africa. He arrived in Bulawayo on December 21, 1904. After retaining permission of the local Ndebele chief Ngege, he founded the Ingwenya Mission: a church, a school and a home. In 1923, due to government resettlement policies, the new chief Bitisani and his people were moved about eighty miles northwards, to the Nkayi District. The chief asked for a preacher, so John Mpofu and his son Alexander went there.

In 1924, John Radasi was accidentally killed by a train at Bembesi Siding. Shortly afterwards, John Tallach, a Scottish minister, arrived in Bulawayo to join the work, which he did until 1948. James Fraser was a teacher under his supervision, who came to Zimbabwe in 1937. Later, he also became a missionary.

Between 1924 and 1948 new missions were established: Zenka Mission and Mbuma Mission. Besides this, 'kraal schools' were also opened in different communities. In 1954 James Fraser started a Teacher Training Center at Mbuma. The work flourished: in 1965 (before the war for independence) a report listed 31 schools directly run by the Mission, a total of 144 teachers and 5120 pupils.

James Fraser died in 1959, only 54 years old. On his death bed he urged the new missionary Jan van Woerden to continue his job: "I will die, but I believe that the Lord will plant a part of His vineyard here. And He uses people for this. May the Lord give you the courage, power, wisdom and strength to carry on the work."

Currently (2023), the Zimbabwe Presbytery of the Free Presbyterian Church of Scotland has two ministers serving 30 congregations. According to Reverend Khumalo there is a great need for more ministers, since the congregations keep expanding.

== Hospital history ==
In 1957, a new hospital was constructed at the Mbuma Mission. It began as a very small building, but quickly expanded. In 1967 the hospital consisted of 6 wards for women and children, and a male ward was added shortly afterwards. In 1969, when Dr James Tallach started to work in the hospital, it consisted of 40 beds. In the time of Dr Hak this expanded to 80 beds. Since December 2005, Dr Snoek has been in charge.

== Buildings ==
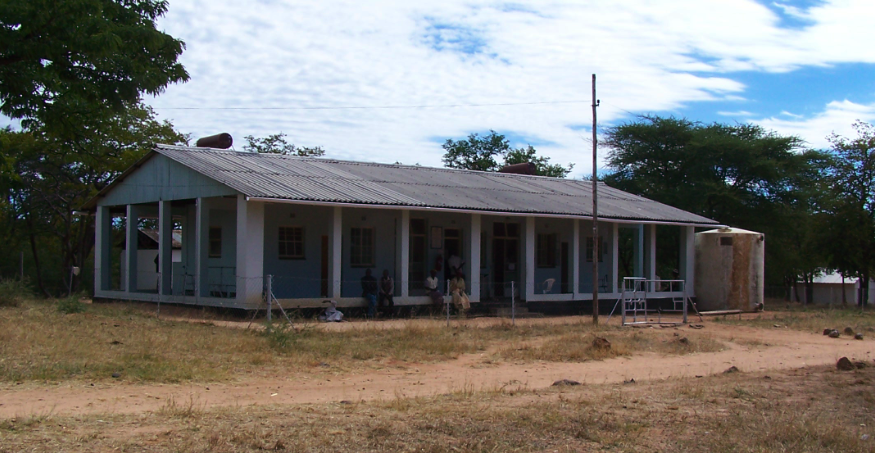
TB ward

Nowadays there are quite a lot of buildings in the hospital compound, surrounded by a perimeter fence. The hospital consists of a female ward, paediatric ward, male ward, labour ward, outpatient department, operation room, dispensary, laboratory and kitchen. A TB ward is situated close to the entrance gate, and behind the female ward is a house where pregnant women live during the last month of their pregnancy. There are several houses for staff members. Within the compound there are also a school, a church and a manse (minister's house). Outside the gate is a small shop.

== Services ==
- Outreach clinics
- AIDS clinic
- Mother and child program
