= Don McFarlane =

Don or Donald MacFarlane or McFarlane is the name of

- Donald MacFarlane (1834-1926), Scottish minister
- Donald Horne Macfarlane (1830-1904), British politician
- Don McFarlane (athlete, born 1926) (1926–2008), Canadian sprinter (University of Western Ontario)
- Don McFarlane (athlete, born 1931), Canadian sprinter (McMaster University)
- Donald McFarlane, American politician
