= African Free Presbyterian Church of Zimbabwe =

Reformed Christian denomination

The African Free Presbyterian Church of Zimbabwe is a Reformed denomination in Zimbabwe. It was begun in 1953 by Rev Edwin Radasi, who broke away from the Free Presbyterian Church of Scotland in Zimbabwe. His father, Rev John Boyana Radasi, was instrumental in founding the Free Presbyterian Church in Zimbabwe. In 1995 there were 4 congregations and 2,100 members; about 4,000 are affiliated with the denomination.
