= John Chalmers (moderator) =

Minister of the Church of Scotland

The Very Reverend John Chalmers KHC
- Moderator of the General Assembly
- Church: Church of Scotland
- In office: May 2014 to May 2015
- Predecessor: Lorna Hood
- Successor: Angus Morrison
- Other post: Principal Clerk to the General Assembly (2010 to present)

Personal details
- Born: Bothwell, Lanarkshire, Scotland
- Denomination: Presbyterianism
- Spouse: Liz Chalmers
- Children: 3, including John-James
- Education: University of Strathclyde; University of Glasgow

John Chalmers, KHC is a minister of the Church of Scotland. From 2010 to 2017, he served as the Principal Clerk to the General Assembly of the Church of Scotland. In 2014, following the withdrawal of Angus Morrison on health grounds, he was nominated to be Moderator of the General Assembly of the Church of Scotland for 2014–15; he was duly formally elected as Moderator on the first day of the General Assembly's week-long annual session. He succeeded Lorna Hood as Moderator. After serving his one-year term, he was succeeded by Angus Morrison. He is a Chaplain in Ordinary to the King - a member of the Ecclesiastical Household in Scotland.

== Background ==
Born in Bothwell, Lanarkshire, John Chalmers studied chemical engineering at the University of Strathclyde before transferring to the University of Glasgow to study divinity. He is married to Liz; they have three children. In 2011, during the General Assembly, his youngest son John-James was severely injured whilst serving with the Royal Marines in Afghanistan. In November 2016 he was awarded an Honorary Degree of Doctor of Divinity by the University of Aberdeen.

== Career ==
His first charge as a parish minister was at Renton Parish Church, Dunbartonshire, followed by Palmerston Place Church in Edinburgh (1986–1995). Since 1995 he has worked full-time in the Church of Scotland Offices, including as Principal Clerk since 2010.

As Moderator, during the Scottish independence referendum campaign, he called for respectful dialogue between the proponents and post-referendum he encouraged the church to be an instrument of healing and reconciliation. In February 2015 he met with Pope Francis in Rome. More recently he has continued his interest in mediation and peacemaking and has worked with the Church leaders of South Sudan helping to equip them to participate in local and community peace building.

== See also ==
- List of moderators of the General Assembly of the Church of Scotland
- Moderators and clerks in the Church of Scotland

Religious titles
Preceded by Lorna Hood	Moderator of the General Assembly of the Church of Scotland; 2014–2015	Succeeded by Angus Morrison
