= Nkayi, Zimbabwe =

Coordinates: 19°00′S 28°54′E

Nkayi District
- administrative district
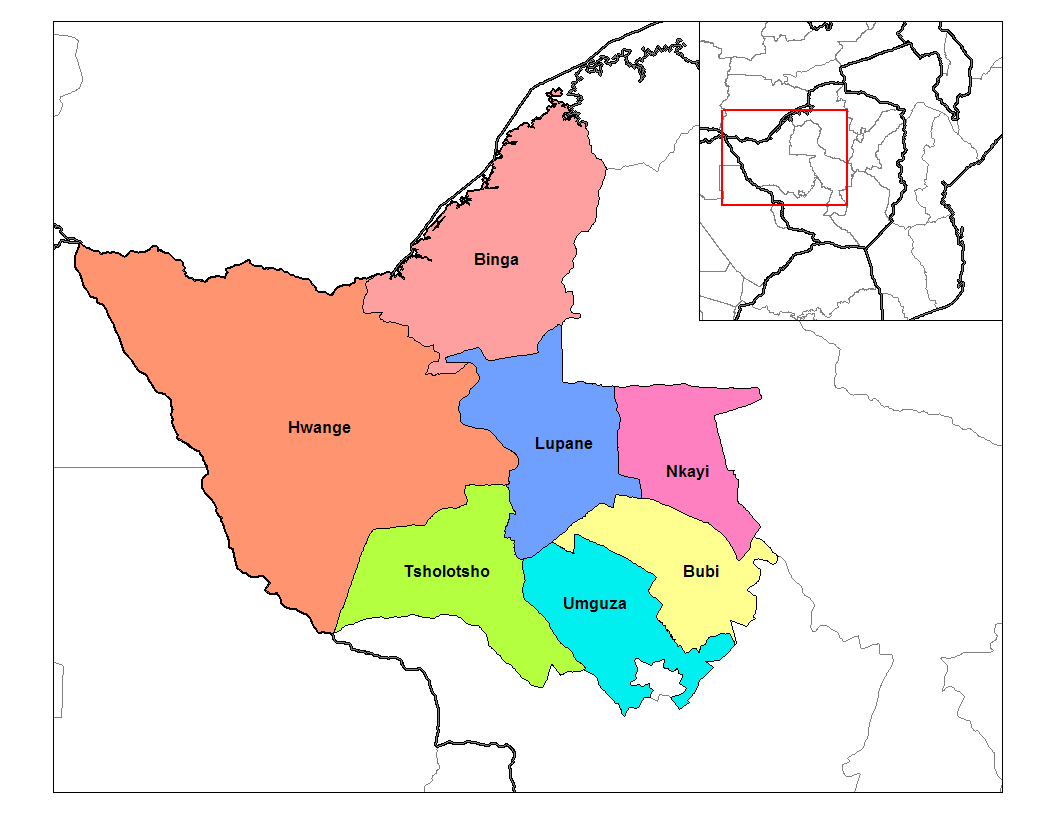
- Binga District in Matabeleland North
- Country: Zimbabwe
- Province: Matabeleland North

Population (2022)
  - Total: 112,471
- Time zone: UTC+2 (CAT)

Nkayi is a district in Matabeleland North, Zimbabwe, about 100 km (62 mi) west of Kwekwe and 168 km (104 mi) northeast of Bulawayo in Nkayi communal land. It is believed that its name originates from the Tonga word "Uyinkayi" meaning "where are you going". The main language spoken is Ndebele.

== Politics ==
It has two constituencies and has produced some of Zimbabwe's liberation war heroes like Roy Reagen Yembeyembe Ndlovu of Mdengelele area. The place has a poor road network where Ntubeni bus services dominate the route. It has been divided into two constituencies, south and north: the North being occupied by Zanu-PF sithembiso nyoni and the South by the Zanu-PF led by Stars Mathe. The former MP of the area was Abednico Bhebhe.

It is underdeveloped with poor water and school facilities. There are several chiefs in the area including the Sikobokobo. Shangani River, which is one of the biggest rivers in Zimbabwe, covers the area. Nkayi District is also rich with history of the Ndebele Kingdom as this where the last King of the Ndebeles King Lobhengula perished in the hands of the British in collaboration with Shona men of 1893. People from Mdengelele and Malinga use it for their livestock to drink and take water for consumption.

== Geography ==
=== Villages ===
There are several villages in the Nkayi district:

- Dakamela is a small settlement in Matabeleland North, Zimbabwe and is located about 140 km north-west of Gweru in the Nkayi District close to the Shangani River.

== Education ==
It has three major secondary schools Nkayi High School, Hadane High School and a boarding school Hlangabeza High School, which is near the district offices. Along its border with Gokwe, Nkayi has two schools: Tsheli Primary School and Tsheli High School.

There are two main primary schools near the local business centre; Dimpamiwa Primary School some 3 km (1.9 mi) along the Nkayi-Kwekwe highway and Nkayi Primary School which is also some 3 km (1.9 mi) along the Nkayi-Gwelutshena dust road. St Mbaga Tuzinde Primary School, a new school is still under construction in the growth point. Zenka Mission Primary School is a feeder school to Mpumelelelo High School, it is run by the Free Presbyterian Church of Scotland. In 2004, the school won the Secretary's Bell, a high achievement in the country.

== Civil society ==
Nkayi area has one of the best mission hospitals in the Matabeleland region namely Mbuma mission. A number of NGOs operate near Nkayi. Freestigma Africa Trust's Founder and Executive Director Sir Frera Washington submitted his organisation papers to the Nkayi local authority for permission to operate in the marginalised district. It has a powerful village which is Sabahwisa village under village leader Gayela and the chief is Madliwa.

Nkayi Rural District Hospital serves the district. In 2013 there were media reports that indicated the breakdown in the services the hospital catered to the citizens, including the mortuary. Another hospital in this district is the Mbuma Mission Hospital.

== Business ==
The main business operation in Nkayi is the teak timber processing plant (Pride of Africa Exports) which is the largest privately owned company employing most of the locals. Nkayi has one of the best teak forests (Gwampa forest).

Nkayi central business district is divided into two main shopping centres, the Old business centre rather known as Nkayi Downstore. The New shopping centre largely relies on the locals and has two major supermarkets. Nkayi has one local bakery. The bakery used to supply all outlets in and around Nkayi.

Also found in Nkayi is the industrial area in the eastern part of the new shopping centre. Industrial part is mainly dominated by the Nkayi Timber processing company. The company process huge masses of timber from locally exploited wood supplies being Sivomo and Gwampa bush. The Nkayi Grain Markerting (GMB) depot is near the timber company and is a local supplier of grain and fertiliser.

The industry also consist of metal fabricators and wood fabricators, of which the metal fabrication is mainly done by a small company, Mthimkhulu Enterprises, that is close to GMB.

There is also Mpumelelo Business Centre in Mpande Ward 22. It is a mini growth point with several stores, bottle stores, a beer hall, veterinary service, cattle sale, Agritex office and Zenka Rural Health Centre is there.

== Transportation ==
A number of transport companies operate the area. Accidents are common. In January 2012, Sihube bus overturned along Bulawayo-Nkayi Road. Two people died on the spot while 60 others were injured, 10 of them seriously, when the bus burst its front tyre, veered off the road and overturned at the 23 km peg along Bulawayo-Nkayi Road. One busy road is the Kwekwe-Nkai Road, which is partly the Luveve-Silobela Road which passes through Silobela to Kwekwe. It joins the Kwekwe-Gokwe Road at Luveve near Kwekwe River bridge.
