= Donald Macdonald (minister) =

Scottish minister

Donald Macdonald (1825 – 20 August 1901) was one of two ministers in the founding Presbytery of the Free Presbyterian Church of Scotland, which separated in 1893 from the Free Church of Scotland (1843–1900) as the result of a Protest at the meeting of the General Assembly of the Free Church on 25 May 1893 by Donald Macfarlane against the Declaratory Act passed by the General Assembly in 1892 modifying the church's adherence to the Westminster Confession of Faith, believing that it thereby 'altered and vitiated' the constitution of the Free Church in law.

Macdonald was born at Langash in the parish of North Uist in 1825. He became the Free Church of Scotland minister in Shieldaig in 1872 but he was evicted from his church and manse in 1893. His biographer wrote: “The Assembly of 1877 presented them [the minister and his congregation] with church and manse in consideration of their faithful adherence to the principles of the Free Church; the Assembly of 1893 deprived them of these gifts for the very same reason!”

He supported the separation of Rev Donald MacFarlane, Raasay, from the Free Church in May 1893 in protest at the church's Declaratory Act. With MacFarlane, he founded the first presbytery of the Free Presbyterian Church of Scotland in August of that year. Like him, he was supported by most of his own congregation but evicted from church and manse by ministers and elders in their respective presbyteries who had stayed within the Free Church.

After worshipping in the open air a new church was opened in 1895 for the newly formed Shieldaig congregation of the Free Presbyterian Church of Scotland and a new manse completed in 1897.

MacDonald and MacFarlane saw the body they founded together grow substantially. His preaching was highly valued and sometimes compared to that of the Rev Archibald Cook of Daviot, Highland Inverness-shire.

He died on 20 August 1901 in his manse at Shieldaig and was buried in Applecross cemetery, followed by his wife Mary who died on 17 August 1909.

== Works and Publications ==
- Creation and the Fall; A Defence and Exposition of the First Three Chapters of Genesis (1856)
