= Associated Presbyterian Churches =

Scottish Calvinist denomination

- Classification: Protestant
- Theology: Reformed Westminster Confession of Faith
- Polity: Presbyterian
- Associations: World Reformed Fellowship
- Origin: May 1989; Inverness
- Separated from: Free Presbyterian Church of Scotland
- Congregations: 4 congregations in Scotland.
- Official website: https://www.apchurches.org/

Timeline showing the evolution of the churches of Scotland from 1560

The Associated Presbyterian Churches (APC) is a Presbyterian church, with congregations in Scotland, and formerly in Canada and New Zealand. It was formed in 1989 as a result of division in the Free Presbyterian Church of Scotland.

== History ==
The division occurred because of a continuing difference over liberty of conscience (as defined in the Westminster Confession of Faith), which came to a head over the attendance of Lord Mackay of Clashfern at a Requiem Mass which formed part of the funeral of a colleague, former Lord Justice Clerk Lord Wheatley. As Mackay was Lord Advocate for Scotland, it was expected that he attend the funeral of a deceased member of the judiciary; Wheatley was also a friend of Mackay. However, Mackay was also an elder in the Edinburgh congregation of the Free Presbyterian Church, and some within the leadership of the denomination (but not within the Edinburgh congregation) found his attendance intolerable, as it regards the Roman Catholic Church as spurious and the Mass as idolatrous. As a result, Mackay was suspended from office as an elder. In addition, the Rev. Alexander Murray (Lairg) was suspended on the same day as Lord Mackay for asking a Roman Catholic priest to say a prayer at a meeting.

Some in the church disagreed with this punishment and a split ensued on 25 May 1989, not only over the Mackay affair (and Alexander Murray) but also the ongoing issue of freedom of conscience. Those who formed the APC believed that liberty of conscience was not being given sufficient place in the Free Presbyterian Church, and that the disciplinary action taken by the Free Presbyterian authorities against Lord Mackay was inappropriate.

They also asserted that the Free Presbyterian Church failed to put into practice the Westminster Confession of Faith's teaching on Communion of the Saints. "The APC seeks to re-assert this communion as expressed in the Westminster Confession of Faith itself." The APC made various unsuccessful attempts at encouraging unity among similar churches in Scotland (Free Church of Scotland, International Presbyterian Church, Free Church (Continuing), Reformed Presbyterian Church). Since 1989, many of its congregations have merged with Free Church of Scotland congregations.

In the months and years after the split, there were legal issues, as the departing ministers often were still residing in the manse, and using disputed buildings for worship, as often the majority of the original congregation departed the denomination alongside their minister.

Rev. Alexander Murray was the inaugural moderator of the Associated Presbyterian Church.

=== Founding Ministers ===
Around 13 serving ministers left the Free Presbyterian Church to form the APC denomination, as well as two others who were retired and Alexander Murray who had been suspended. These ministers include:

1. Rev. Douglas Beattie (Vancouver). The remnant FPC church in Vancouver closed. The APC church continued until 2022 when it joined the RPCNA.
2. Rev. Donald Macaskill (Dundee). The remnant FPC church in Dundee closed. The APC church is still holding services.
3. Rev. George Macaskill (Dumbarton). The remnant FPC church in Dumbarton closed. The APC church in Dumbarton also closed before 2012.
4. Rev. Donald A. Macdonald (retired from Kames 1975.)
5. Rev. Angus F. MacKay (retired from Inverness in 1987.)
6. Rev. Hamish I. Mackinnon (Oban). The remnant FPC church in Oban closed and was united with Fort William. Mackinnon was received back into the FPC in 2000. The APC church is still holding services.
7. Rev. Archie MacPhail (Lochinver). The remnant FPC church in Lochinver closed and was united with Ullapool. The APC congregation joined with the Free Church congregation.
8. Rev. Malcolm (or Calum) MacInnes (Toronto). There is now neither an FPC nor APC church in Toronto.
9. Rev. Angus Morrison (Edinburgh). The remnant FPC church in Edinburgh appointed a new minister within two years and is still going. The APC church closed circa 2022.
10. Rev. Alexander Murray (Lairg) [Had been recently suspended by the FPC, so had to be reinstated by the APC]. The remnant FPC church in Lairg closed and was united with Dornoch. The APC church also closed, circa 2020.
11. Rev. P. Lloyd Roberts (Applecross). The remnant FPC church closed and was united with Shieldaig. The APC church closed in 2012.
12. Rev. John Walter Ross (Lochcarron). The remnant FPC church closed and was united with Kyle and Plockton. The APC congregation joined with the Free Church congregation around 2003.
13. Rev. John Ross (Tain and Fearn). The remnant FPC churches closed and were united with Dornoch. The APC congregation joined with the Free Church congregation circa 2019.
14. Rev. Robert Ross Sinclair (Wick). The remnant FPC church closed and was united with Halkirk. The APC church closed circa 2020.
15. Rev. Fraser Tallach (Kinlochbervie). The remnant FPC church never appointed another minister but is still holding services. The APC church closed in 2025.
16. Rev. John A. Tallach (Aberdeen). The remnant FPC church took back the buildings in 2000, appointed a new minister in 2005 and is still going. The APC congregation closed circa 2000 with most of its younger members going to form "The Mission".

In addition to the congregations of the above ministers, APC congregations were founded in Inverness (still going), Stornoway (still going), Broadford/Skye (closed 2021), Fort William (closed 2012), Harris (closed 2025), Poolewe (joined the Free Church in 2015) and Plockton-Kyle (closed 2012).

== Doctrine ==
The Associated Churches website states: "We believe that it is correct to allow Christians to make their own decisions on matters that are not fundamental to the faith."

The church's beliefs "are stated in a confession that is catholic, Reformed, and biblical, and which states the historic convictions of the Church of Scotland" the Westminster Confession of Faith.

== Churches ==
Current churches:

- Dundee APC. Minister: Philip Ross.
- Inverness APC. Minister: John Ferguson (2011-). Have their own building (Kingsview Christian Centre).
- Oban APC. Meets in a community centre and a congregational church.
- Stornoway and Harris APC. Ministers: George MacAskill (1993-2012; retired), Jonathan Baxter (2019–25; left for Glasgow Reformed Presbyterian Church). Services in Harris (using a Church of Scotland building) ceased in July 2025. The Stornoway congregation has its own building.

Former churches:

Several APC congregations have merged with the Free Church over the years by transfer of membership.

- Aberdeen. Church and manse returned to FPC 2000. Charity closed 2012.
- Applecross. Closed 2012.
- Dumbarton. Closed 2012.
- Edinburgh. Closed 2022. Ministers: Angus Morrison (1989-2000; left to join Church of Scotland).
- Fort William. Church and manse returned to FPC 2000. Worshipped with Free Church from 2001. Charity closed 2012.
- Harris. United with Stornoway. Services ceased 2025.
- Kinlochbervie. Closed 2025.
- Lairg. The APC in Lairg closed 2024.
- Lochcarron. Joined with the Free Church in 2003.
- Lochinver. Joined with the Free Church before 2019.
- Plockton and Kyle. Closed 2012.
- Poolewe. Joined with the Free Church in 2015.
- Skye or Broadford. Charity closed 2021.
- Tain and Fearn. Joined with the Free Church in 2019.
- Vancouver. Joined the RPCNA in 2025.
- Wick, Strathy and Thurso. Closed 2020.

== International organisations ==
The Associated Presbyterian Churches is a member of the World Reformed Fellowship.
