= St. Jude's Church, Glasgow =

St. Jude's Church
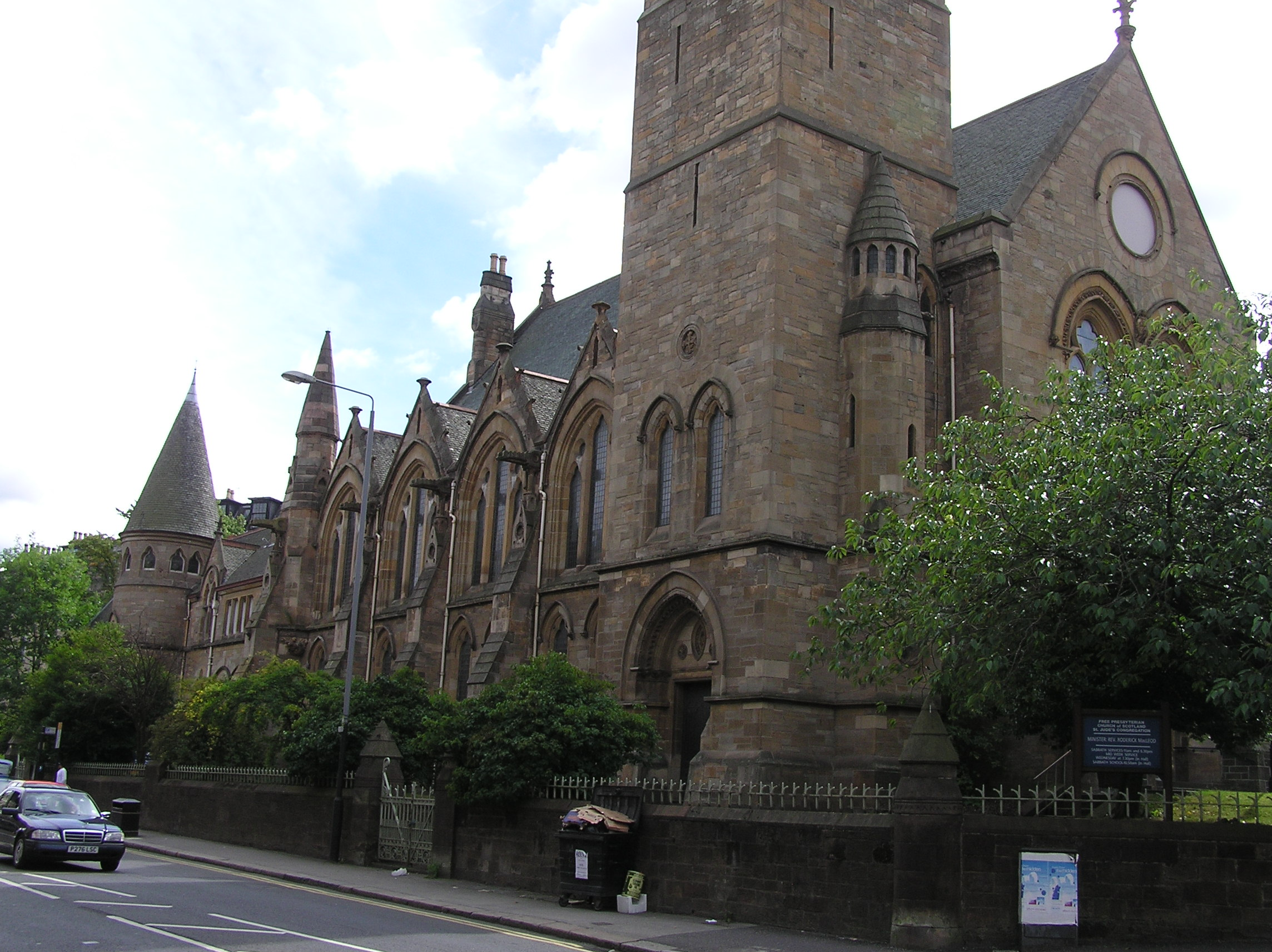
- St. Judes church in Woodlands Road, Glasgow, Scotland
- St. Jude's Church
- 55.8694°N 4.2750°W
- Location: Glasgow
- Country: Scotland
- Denomination: Free Presbyterian Church of Scotland
- Website: Glasgow Congregation

Architecture
- Functional status: Church
- Heritage designation: Category B listed building
- Designated: 15 December 1970
- Architect: John Burnet
- Style: French Gothic
- Completed: 1875

St. Jude's Church is a place of worship of the Free Presbyterian Church of Scotland on Woodlands Road in Glasgow, Scotland. It is the largest church building of this denomination, constructed circa 1874-6 for the Woodlands United Presbyterian Church, later Woodlands United Free Church. The Free Presbyterian Bookroom is located in back rooms at the church.

In the early 20th century, in a previous building also known as St Jude's, the name given to it by its previous owners, the congregation had an attendance of over 1,000, and was the largest Free Presbyterian congregation.
