= John Dowgray =

John Dowgray (6 June 1873–28 January 1950) was a New Zealand coalminer, trade unionist and bank director. He was born in Bothwell, Lanarkshire, Scotland on 6 June 1873.
