= Bothwell =

Coordinates: 55.802329°N 4.066217°W

Bothwell: Scottish Gaelic: Both Chluaidh
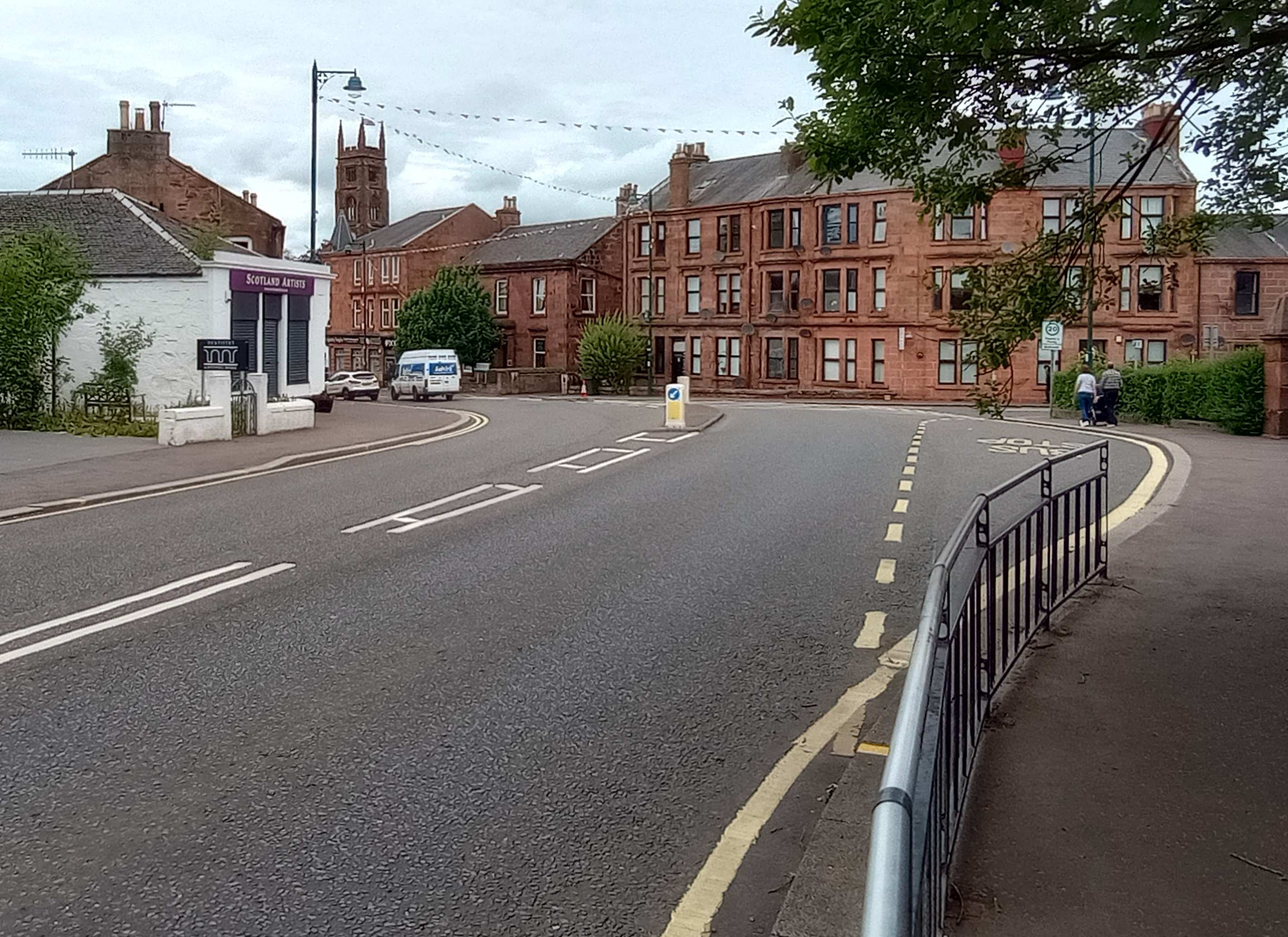
- Bothwell Main Street

- Flag

- Location within South Lanarkshire
- Population: 6,870 (2020)
- OS grid reference: NS705585
- Council area: South Lanarkshire
- Lieutenancy area: Lanarkshire
- Country: Scotland
- Sovereign state: United Kingdom
- Post town: Glasgow
- Postcode district: G71
- Dialling code: 01698
- Police: Scotland
- Fire: Scottish
- Ambulance: Scottish
- UK Parliament: Rutherglen
- Scottish Parliament: Uddingston and Bellshill

Bothwell (Scottish Gaelic: Both Chluaidh) is a conservation village in the South Lanarkshire council area of Scotland and part of the Greater Glasgow area. It lies on the north bank of the River Clyde, adjacent to Uddingston and Hamilton, 9 miles (14 km) east-south-east of Glasgow city centre. In the early 2020s, the village was the site of a number of widely reported gang-related firebomb attacks.

== Description ==
An ancient settlement which was once primarily a mining village, and earlier the site of the Battle of Bothwell Bridge in 1679, Bothwell is an affluent commuter town that has attracted a number of well-off people to move there, including several professional footballers. Owing to a steady rise in property prices, Bothwell is one of Glasgow's most expensive satellites. In December 2018, Earls Gate, which overlooks Bothwell Castle, was named Greater Glasgow's most expensive street, with houses selling for an average £1,125,000. In 2021, Earls Gate was named the most expensive street in the entire west of Scotland.

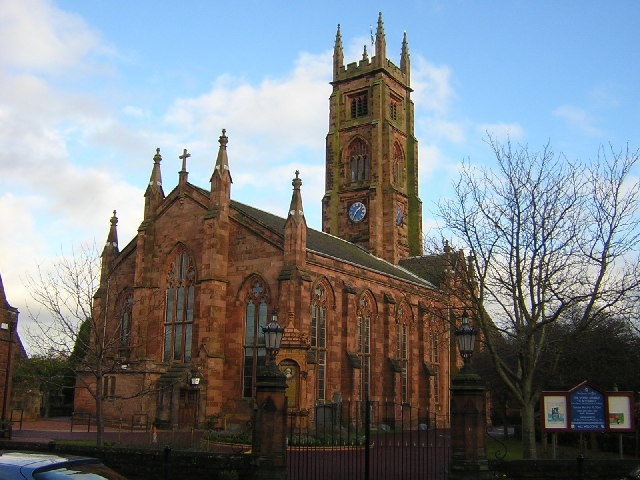
Bothwell Parish Church

The houses surrounding the Main Street are of older sandstone Victorian style whereas the newer part of the Bothwell consists of estates built in close proximity to Bothwell Castle and intertwined with Bothwell Castle Golf club. The new houses have significantly increased the population. According to the recent census report 2011, Bothwell has a population of c. 6000, with the local council ward in combination with Uddingston established a year earlier. The majority of Bothwell's residents own their own property, and household incomes are likely to exceed the national average.

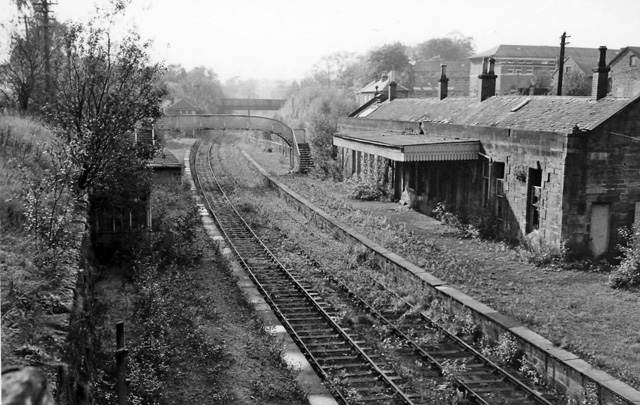
Until 1955 Bothwell had a station on the North British Railway. These are the remains in 1961

Bothwell has two primary schools (the rebuilt Bothwell PS and St Bride's Roman Catholic PS), a library and a bowling club. There are several small shops and businesses in the town's main street, along with a handful of pubs and restaurants. The Bothwell area has many walkways, nature trails, woodlands and greenery. A footbridge links with Blantyre on the opposite bank of the river, and leads directly to the David Livingstone Centre.

The parish church (which was restored at the end of the 19th century) contains the choir of the old Gothic church of 1398. A memorial honours the poet Joanna Baillie (1762–1851) who was born in the manse.

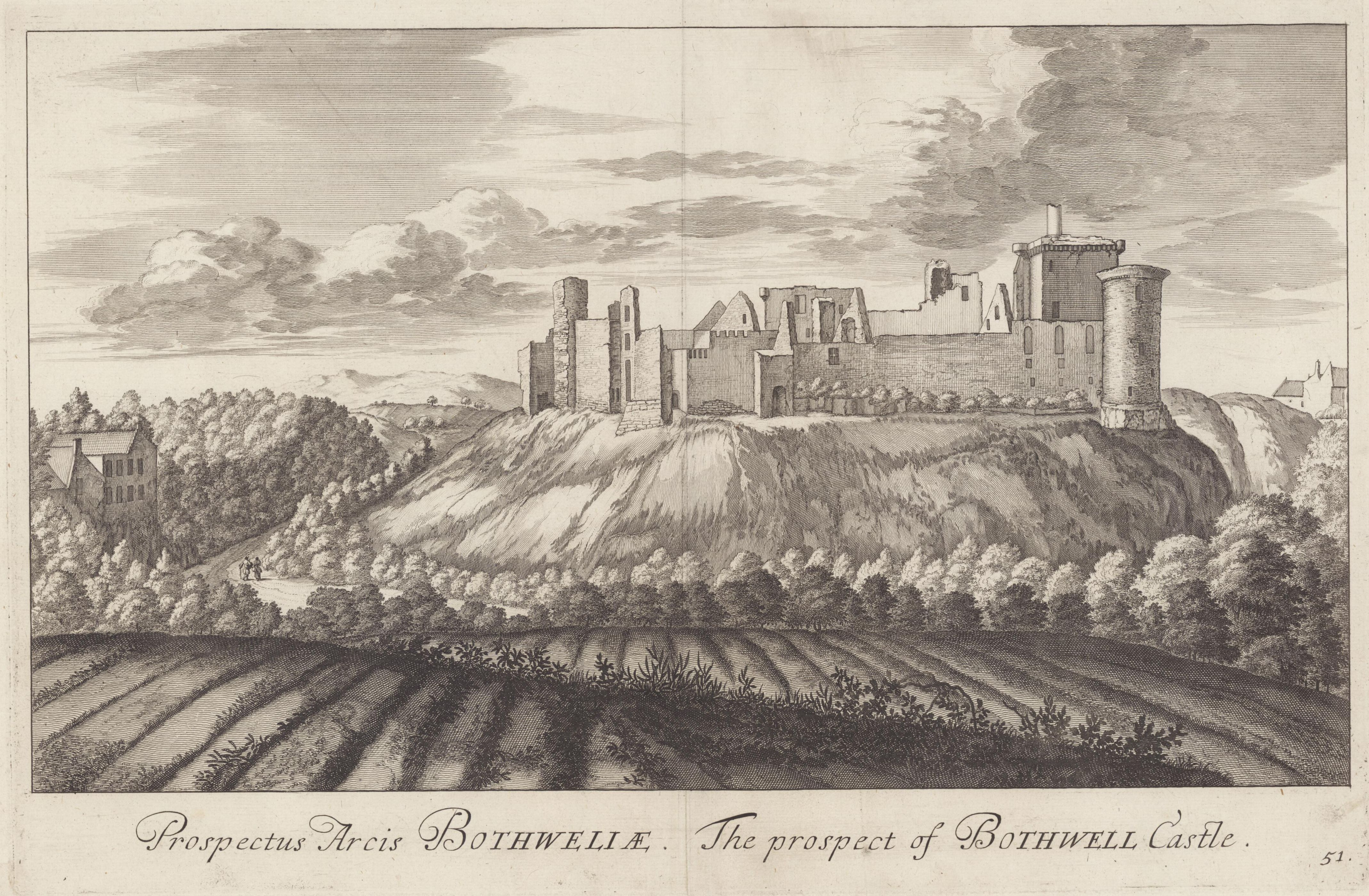
Bothwell Castle

== Bothwell Castle ==
The picturesque ruin of Bothwell Castle occupies a position on a bluff above a bend in the River Clyde on the edge of Bothwell, which here takes the bold sweep famed in Scottish song as the Bothwell bank This fortress belonged to Sir William Moray, known as 'le Riche', who died in England in 1300 It passed eventually by marriage to the House of Douglas. The lordship was bestowed in 1487 on Patrick Hepburn, 3rd Lord Hailes, 1st Earl of Bothwell. When he resigned in 1491 the title passed to "Bell-the-Cat", Archibald Douglas, 5th Earl of Angus. The title ultimately passed to the Earls of Home.

The castle is a fine example of Gothic architecture. It consists of a great quadrangle with circular towers on the south. At the east end stand the remains of the chapel. An unpretentious mansion was built nearby by Archibald Douglas, 1st Earl of Forfar (1653–1712), and was known as New Bothwell Castle, but suffered mining subsidence and was demolished in 1926. The castle can be accessed through scenic Clyde Walkways.

== Arson attacks ==
There were many arson attacks in the town from about 2020, with 27 attacks between 2021 and 2026 on restaurants, vehicles and some private residences, with no prosecutions, and businesses being driven away; Bothwell has been nicknamed the firebomb capital of the UK. Gangland attacks have been suspected.

== Brighter Bothwell ==
Brighter Bothwell is a local environmental group, formed in 2000 for the benefit of the whole community of Bothwell. Their objective is to enhance the environment directly through the endeavours of volunteers.

Since the formation of the group, many public areas have been improved and some major projects have been undertaken including the Nature Trail, The Jubilee Garden and The Marion Gilchrist Garden. In the Beautiful Scotland campaign, the group has raised the village to Silver Gilt award standard and, in 2012, Bothwell won the prize as winner of the Small Town category.

Brighter Bothwell has also encouraged the formation of two additional community groups, The Organic Growers of Bothwell and The Bothwell Scarecrow Festival. Working along with Brighter Bothwell, these groups are having a positive impact on the community.

=== Scarecrow Festival ===
In the autumn of 2010, inspired by a number of festivals already held in villages across the UK, Brighter Bothwell developed The Bothwell Community Scarecrow Festival to extend and develop the feeling of community in Bothwell and to support the local economy. The first festival took place in September 2011, and subsequently every year after.

The festival has become very popular and the main street is filled with imaginative scarecrows from August onwards. Many local businesses make their own scarecrows, as do the local children whose gardens are also filed with scarecrows at the time of year. Yorkhill Children's foundation is the beneficiary of the event.

During the 2013 festival, a new event was held at Bothwell Primary School called 'The Scarecrow Festival of Transport'. It was intended to be a celebration of transport throughout the ages. Various people from the village donated their automobiles for the event, such as Boyd Tunnock of the local company Tunnock's, and Bentley Glasgow.

== Sports ==
=== Speedway ===
Motorcycle speedway racing was staged in the Bothwell Castle estate area in the late 1940s and early 1950s. The track was constructed on old railway land by club members who used it as a training track. Occasional team matches saw the Bothwell Bulls take on other training venues such as Newtongrange and High Beech.

Tommy Miller, who rose to fame with Glasgow Tigers in 1950, and Ken McKinlay, arguably the best ever Scottish speedway rider, both started out at Bothwell. The venture, safety fence and all, moved to Chapelhall.

=== Golf club ===
Bothwell Castle Golf Club was officially opened on the 16th of June 1923 by the Earl of Home (father of Prime Minister Sir Alec Douglas-Home). The course covered a 110-acre site situated between the 13th century castle and the then small village of Bothwell.

In 1960 the club were unable to accept an offer to buy the course, which was purchased by a developer. By 1962, building proposals were in place resulting in the club losing 7 holes for housing, and having to develop new ground to replace these holes. This new section of the course opened in 1973.

The club finally purchased the course in 1976 for £70,000, thereby securing its long-term future.

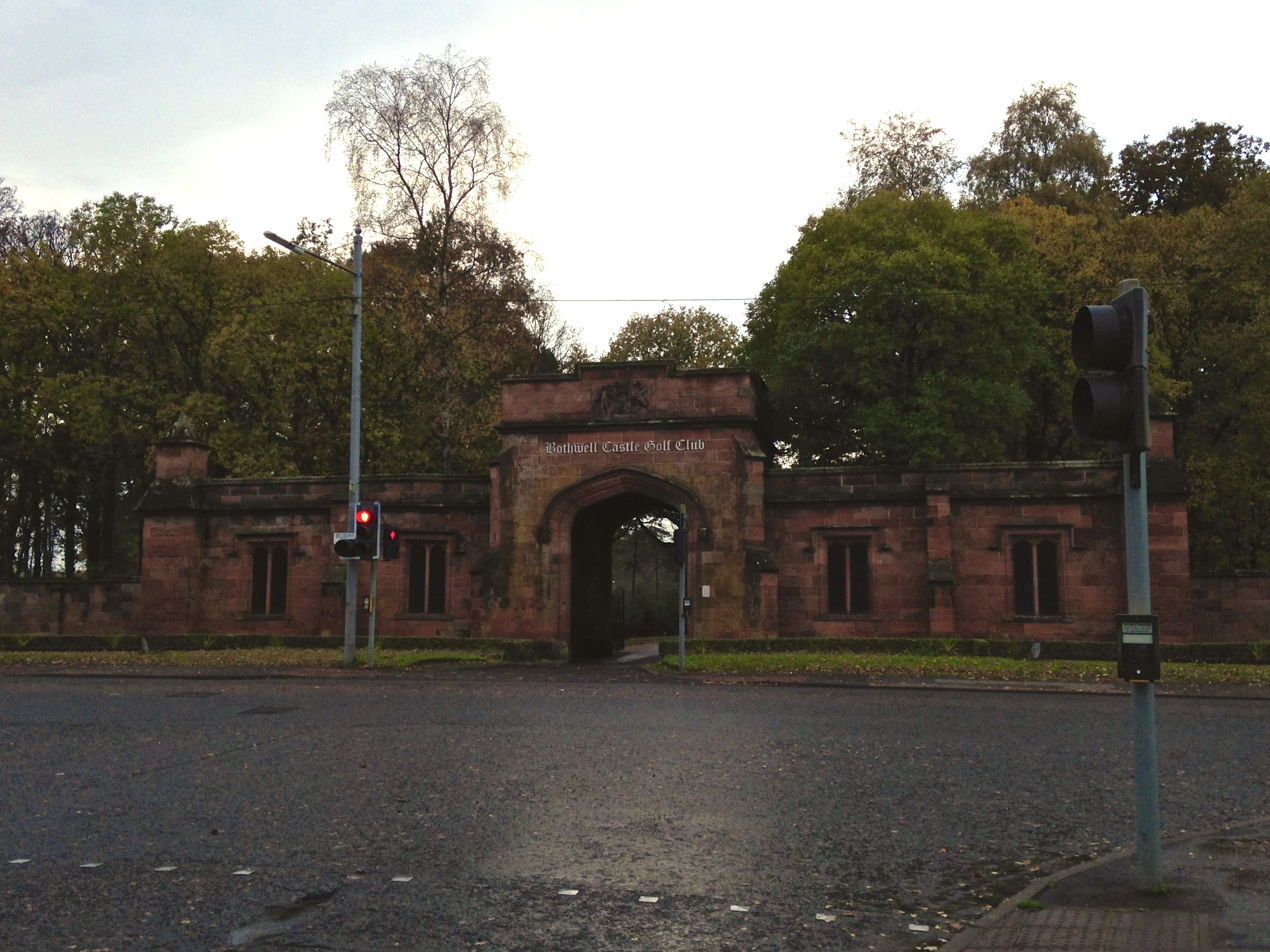
The entrance to Bothwell Castle Golf Club, located on Bothwell Road.

In 2002, a fire resulted in the complete destruction of the clubhouse. The club decided to build the replacement clubhouse in a new location closer to the centre of the course. Officially opened in October 2004 by Richard Cole-Hamilton CBE, the Captain of the R&A Golf Club of St Andrews.

In 1997, Lady Member Sheila Beckett produced a book on the history of the Club to commemorate its 75th anniversary.

A flat, 18-hole parkland course, Bothwell is challenging for players at all levels. The building of the new clubhouse has allowed the club to revise the course layout, with several new tee positions and some new greens.

== Notable residents ==
This list includes notable persons who were born or have lived in Bothwell.

- Joanna Baillie, poet and playwright
- Theresa Breslin, novelist
- Chris Brookmyre, crime novelist
- John Chalmers, Moderator of the General Assembly of the Church of Scotland 2014–15 (born in Bothwell)
- Joseph James Coleman, chemist and inventor of the Bell-Coleman effect in freezing and air-conditioning
- John Dowgray (born in Bothwell, 1873), New Zealand coalminer, trade unionist and bank director
- Marion Gilchrist, first female graduate of the University of Glasgow and the first woman to qualify in medicine from a Scottish university
- Leigh Griffiths, footballer
- Henrik Larsson, Swedish footballer
- Archie MacPherson, football broadcaster and journalist
- John Pagan, Moderator of the General Assembly of the Church of Scotland and 1899–1900 minister of Bothwell
- Gordon Strachan, football manager
