= Stornoway Free Presbyterian Church =

Coordinates: 58.2116°N 6.3832°W

Free Presbyterian Church
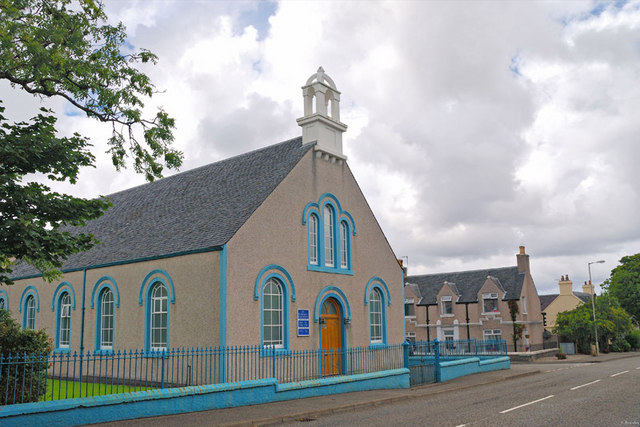
- Free Presbyterian Church, Stornoway, Scotland
- Free Presbyterian Church
- Location: Stornoway
- Country: Scotland
- Denomination: Free Presbyterian Church of Scotland

History
- Founded: 1895

Architecture
- Functional status: church
- Completed: 1895

The Stornoway Free Presbyterian Church, is a place of worship of the Free Presbyterian Church of Scotland in Stornoway. The church edifice was completed in 1899 and opened on the 5th June that year.
