= Dugald MacFarlane (moderator) =

Scottish minister (1869–1956)

Dugald MacFarlane (10 July 1869 – 8 October 1956) was a Scottish minister who served as Moderator of the General Assembly of the Church of Scotland in 1937.

== Biography ==
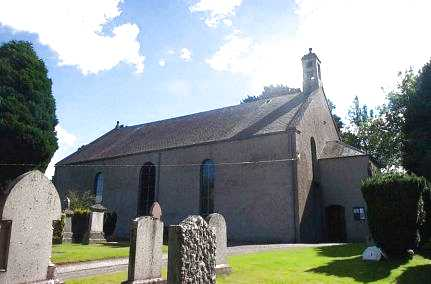
Kingussie Parish Church

He was born in Tobermory, Mull, on 10 July 1869, the youngest of seven children to Catherine (née McLachlan, 1825–?) and Rev Duncan MacFarlane (1822–1908). His father was originally from Tiree and moved to Tobermory as a merchant, before becoming a Baptist minister in 1856. In 1879, he succeeded his brother, John MacFarlane, as minister of Tiree Baptist Church.

Dugald was brought up bilingual in both Gaelic and English from childhood. He was educated at the Royal High School, Edinburgh, then studied divinity at the University of Edinburgh. He was licensed to preach in 1895, and his first post was as assistant at St John's Church in Edinburgh.

He was ordained as a Church of Scotland minister in Glencoe and in 1902 translated to Arrochar before moving to Kingussie in 1906, where he settled for the rest of his life, conducting services at St Columba's church in Pont-street. In May 1937, he succeeded Very Rev Daniel Lamont as moderator.

He died in Kingussie on 8 October 1956, and is buried in Kingussie Parish Churchyard.
