= Vatten, Skye =

Coordinates: 57.403808°N 6.5225287°W

Vatten
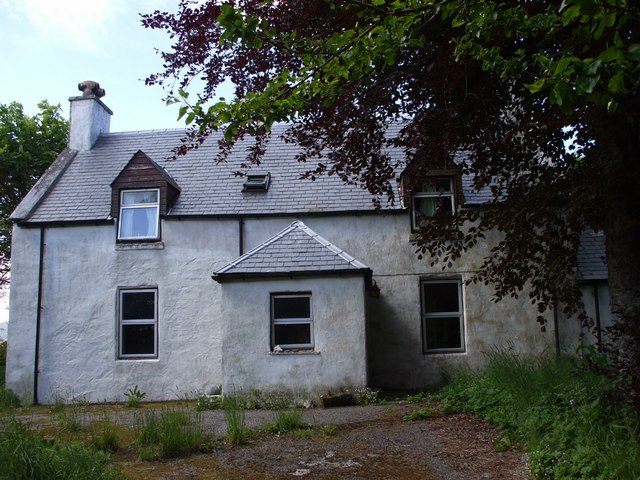

- Location within the Isle of Skye
- Area: 89 km^{2} (34 sq mi)
- Population: 315 (2011)
  - Density: 4/km^{2} (10/sq mi)
- Council area: Highland
- Country: Scotland
- Sovereign state: United Kingdom
- Police: Scotland
- Fire: Scottish
- Ambulance: Scottish

Vatten is a hamlet 3 miles (4.8 km) south east of Dunvegan, on the eastern shore of Loch Vatten, on the Isle of Skye, in the council area of Highland, Scotland. In 2011 it had a population of 315.

== History ==
The name "Vatten" came from Old Norse vatn ("water"). Vatten had a school, it closed in 1984 and the pupils transferred to Dunvegan.
