= James Gunn Matheson =

Scottish minister

James Gunn Matheson (1 March 1912 – 28 October 2007) was a Scottish Church of Scotland minister. He served as Moderator of the General Assembly of the Church of Scotland in 1975. He did much to bridge differences between religions and was a strong friend of Archbishop Thomas Winning.

== Early life ==
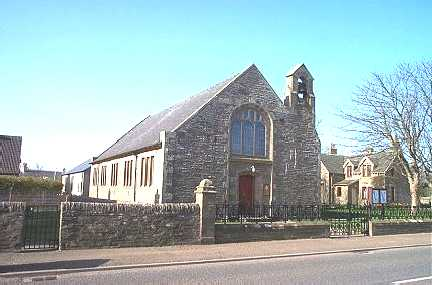
Olrig Parish Church

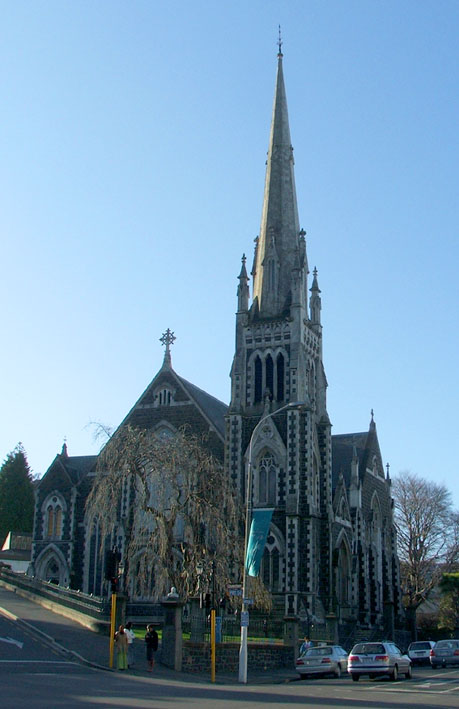
Knox Church, Dunedin, New Zealand

He was born 1 March 1912 in Caithness the son of Rev Donald Matheson, a Free Church of Scotland minister, and Henrietta Gunn (1884-1960). He was the third of 10 children born in the family. He was educated Inverness Royal Academy.

His father, Rev Norman Matheson (1987-1952) and his uncle, Rev Donald John Matheson (1980-1962) were sons of Donald Matheson, a missionary in the Free Presbyterian Church of Scotland, and themselves were ordained into the denomination. James was born while his father was Free Presbyterian Minister in Halkirk, Caithness. In 1920, his father joined the Free Church of Scotland.

== Ministry career ==
He studied arts and divinity at the University of Edinburgh. He was ordained around 1934 and his first charge was Olrig in Caithness.

In the Second World War he served as an Army Chaplain in North Africa. He was captured by the Germans at the Battle of Tobruk in 1942. He was held as a prisoner-of-war in Italy for the remainder of the war. During this time he learned Italian and acted as a liaison officer with the Italian authorities.

On release he rejoined the ministry and served at St Columba's Church in Blackhall, Edinburgh from 1946. In 1951 he travelled to the other side of the world as minister of Knox Church, Dunedin in New Zealand.

In 1961 he returned to Scotland to take on a senior administrative role at the Church of Scotland Offices on George Street in Edinburgh. During this period he was an elder in Mayfield Church in southern Edinburgh. In 1973 he returned to ministry going north to the remote town of Portree on Skye. This post necessitated him learning Gaelic. The University of Edinburgh awarded him an honorary doctorate (DD) in 1975.

He succeeded Very Rev David Steel as Moderator in 1975 and in turn was succeeded by Very Rev Thomas F. Torrance in 1976. Subsequently, he was titled The Very Rev. Dr. James Gunn Matheson.

== Personal life ==
In 1937 he married Janet (Nettie) Clarkson and together they had two daughters and three sons: Peter, Patricia, Lindsay, Ellie and David. He was a great-grandfather.

He latterly live at Totaig on the Isle of Skye. He died at the Royal Infirmary in Edinburgh, after a short illness, on 28 October 2007 aged 95. He was survived by his siblings, Christine, Barbara and Norman, and his five children and their families. His funeral was on 2 November 2007 at Portree Parish Church, and he is buried at Portree Cemetery.

== Publications ==
- Do You Believe This?
- Saints and Sinners
