= John Pagan =

Scottish minister and amateur botanist

John Pagan (1830-1909) was a Scottish minister and amateur botanist who served as Moderator of the General Assembly of the Church of Scotland in 1899.

== Life ==
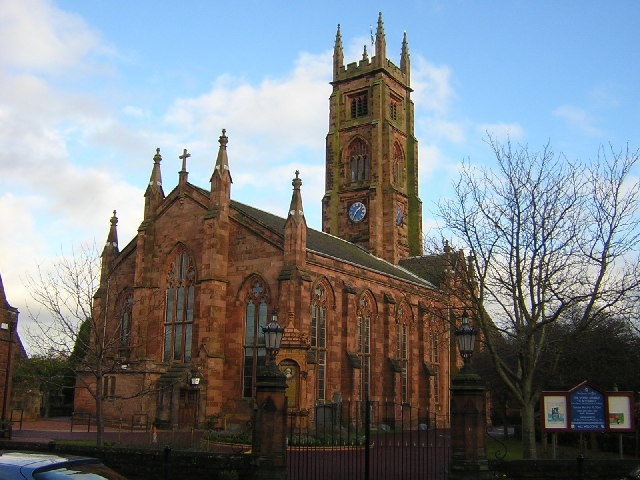
The Parish Church of Bothwell

He was born in Wamphray on 30 June 1830 the son of John Pagan and Mary Hamilton. He was educated locally then studied divinity at Glasgow University graduating MA in 1854. He was ordained into the Church of Scotland and began his ministry at Forgandenny in 1861.

He was minister of Bothwell church from 1865 and oversaw the installation of the memorial window to John Purdon Brown, a fine piece of stained glass by Daniel Cottier. In 1884 he served as Joint Convenor of the Foreign Missionary Committee. He was Moderator of the Church of Scotland in 1899. In 1899 he also organised a Monument to Miss Joanna Baillie at the entrance to his church. He served as Convenor on the Committee for Christian Liberality from 1900 until death.

In 1903 he was one of the several former Moderators invited to the official coronation of King Edward VII.

He died in Largs on 21 January 1909 aged 78.

== Family ==
In 1870 he was married to Margaret Wiseman Lang (1843-1933). Their children, three sons and one daughter, included Rev Gavin Lang Pagan, minister of St George's Church in Edinburgh.
