= John Tallach =

Free Presbyterian minister in Scotland

Rev John Tallach
- Born: 24 September 1890; Dornoch, Scotland
- Died: 30 October 1955 (aged 65)
- Resting place: Pennyfuir Cemetery, Oban
- Other names: Mfundisi Tallach (Africa)
- Occupation: Free Presbyterian minister
- Known for: Moderator of Synod (1933,1947)
- Notable work: missionary work in Africa
- Spouse: Ann (Annie) Sinclair
- Children: 5

John Tallach (24 September 1890 – 30 October 1955) was a Free Presbyterian minister in Scotland who served as Moderator of Synod in both 1933 and 1947.

In 1958, the John Tallach High School, a mission school 40 km (25 mi) from Bulawayo in Zimbabwe, was opened.

== Life ==
Tallach was born on 24 September 1890 in Dornoch. His younger brother was James Andrew Tallach, Moderator of Synod in 1934, 1944 and 1957.

He was licensed to preach by the Free Presbyterian Church of Scotland in September 1924 and chose to do missionary work in Africa, travelling to what was then Rhodesia (now Zimbabwe) in October 1924 to join Rev John Boyana Radasi in Ingwenya, where they ran a boarding school. He did much work there and also married and raised his children there. He was known as Mfundisi Tallach ([isiNdebele] for Pastor Tallach).

They returned to Scotland in 1947 and in 1949 he found a new post in Oban and remained there for the rest of his life.

He died on 30 October 1955 and was buried in Pennyfuir Cemetery in Oban.

== Family ==
Tallach married Ann (Annie) Sinclair, daughter of Rev. James Steven Sinclair. She died in 2004 aged 104. Her brother Robert Ross Sinclair was also a Moderator of Synod.

They had three daughters, Catherine, Margaret and Helen and two sons, James and Rev. Ian Ross Tallach who was born in Ingwenya.

John Tallach was uncle to Samuel Fraser Tallach, Moderator of Synod in 1987.
