= Donald MacFarlane =

Founder of Free Presbyterian church of Scotland

Rev. Donald Macfarlane (1834–1926) was the founding father of the Free Presbyterian Church of Scotland.

== Early life ==
Macfarlane was born in 1834 on the island of North Uist at Vallay. He was the fourth of a family of six sons. His father, Donald Macfarlane, was from Skye, and managed the farms of the proprietor of the island. His mother was Elizabeth (Betty) MacDonald.

In 1856, while listening to Rev. Alexander MacColl, the renowned Highland preacher, Donald Macfarlane was convicted by the question, “Is there any young man in the audience who will come to Christ?” Through that experience, and reading some more gospel tracts, he became a Christian.

He taught for a time in North Uist, before studying in the University and the Free Church College, Glasgow.

== Ministry ==
Macfarlane was licensed by Free Church Presbytery of Skye and Uist at Snizort on 24 June 1874. He was ordained and inducted 6 January 1876 to the Free Church charge of Strathconon in Ross-shire 1876 where he served until 1879. From there, he served in Moy from 1879 to 1888, then Kilmallie from 1888 to 1893. His final charge in the Free Church was on the island of Raasay, to which he was inducted on 27 April 1893.

After the beginning of the Free Presbyterian Church, on 14 August 1893, he served in Raasay until 1903 when he was translated to the Dingwall congregation which he pastored until his death in 1926.

He was the Moderator of the Free Presbyterian Synod in 1917 and 1920.

== Free Presbyterian Church split ==
The Free Presbyterian Church of Scotland began as a separate denomination when he tabled a Protest against the Declaratory Act at 25 May 1893 meeting of the General Assembly of the Free Church of Scotland (1843–1900). The Act, originally passed in 1892, had allowed a watering-down of the Calvinism of the church and conservative Free Churchmen like Macfarlane believed it would prevent church discipline of those who opposed the Westminster Confession of Faith as a result of it. Macfarlane and those who followed him believed that it 'altered and vitiated' the constitution of the Free Church. On 28 July 1893, at a meeting in Portree, Isle of Skye, Macfarlane joined the Rev Donald Macdonald, Shieldaig and Alexander Macfarlane, a schoolmaster on Raasay, in forming a presbytery.

== Personal life and death ==
He married Mary Stewart Morrison on 14 April, 1880 at the Windsor Hotel, 100 Princes Street, Edinburgh. She was about 13 years younger, and was then a resident of Glasgow, but was originally from Snizort, Skye. They had no children.

On the 4 November 1926, Macfarlane died, aged 92. He had served as a minister for nearly 51 years.
