= Stockinish Island =

Island in Scotland

Eilean Stocainis (Gaelic)

Location
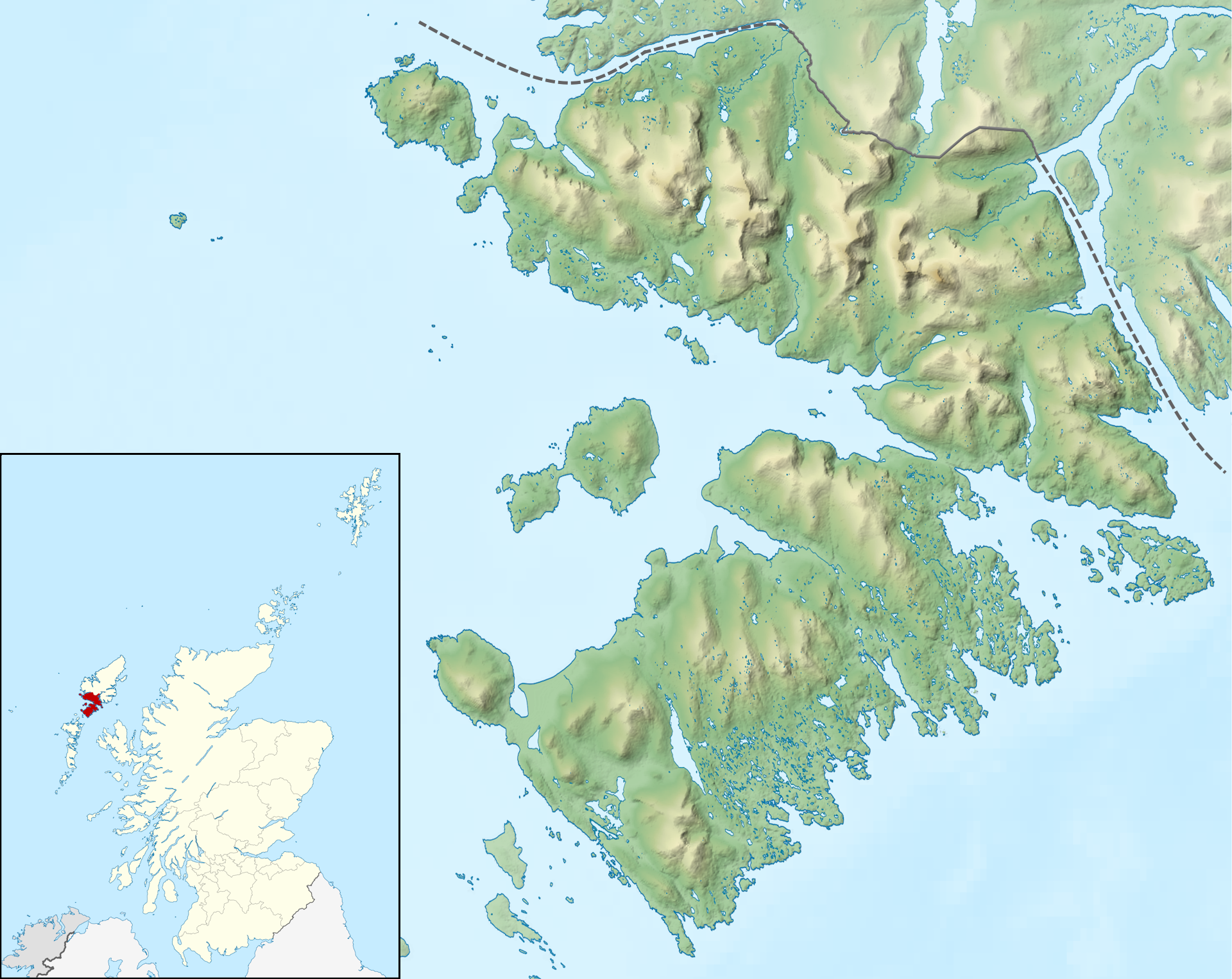
- Stockinish Island shown next to Harris Stockinish Island shown within the Outer Hebrides
- OS grid reference: NG136903
- Coordinates: 57.81°N 6.82°W

Physical geography
- Island group: Lewis and Harris
- Area: 49 hectares (0.19 sq mi)
- Area rank: 205=
- Highest elevation: 44 metres (144 ft)

Administration
- Council area: Na h-Eileanan Siar
- Country: Scotland
- Sovereign state: United Kingdom

Demographics
- Population: 0

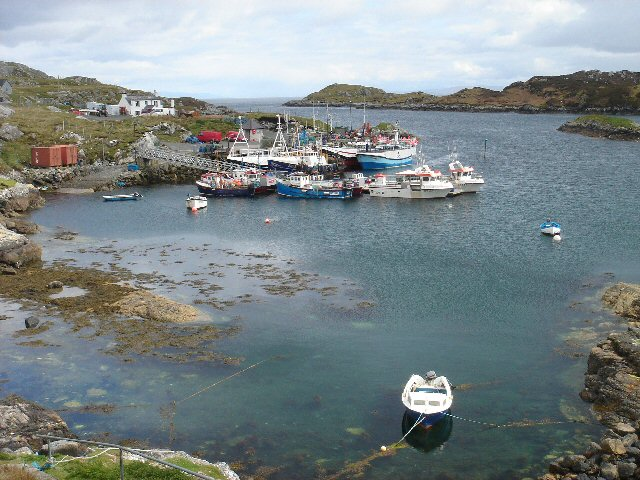
Stockinish Harbour

Stockinish Island (Scottish Gaelic: Eilean Stocainis) is an uninhabited island off Harris, in the Outer Hebrides.

== Geography and geology ==
Stockinish Island lies on the edge of the Minch, in the mouth of Loch Stockinish, south east of Harris. It is uninhabited and is now used for grazing. The island is 49 hectares (0.19 sq mi) in area, and rises to 44 metres (144 ft) at its highest point. Loch an t-Sàile (loch of the brine), in the centre of the island, is an artificially dammed salt water loch, probably formerly a fish trap, and now used as a lobster pond.

Stockinish's geology is Lewisian gneiss.

Stockinish Island has two kyles (narrows), namely Caolas Beag to the north east and Caolas Mòr to the south west. It provides shelter to Stockinish Loch, which has a pier used by yachts during the summer.

To the south west is the small Eilean Leasait, and Stac nam Faoileag (seagull stack) is just to the south. There are a number of reefs to the south, which are above water at low tide.
