= Congregationalism =

Religious denomination

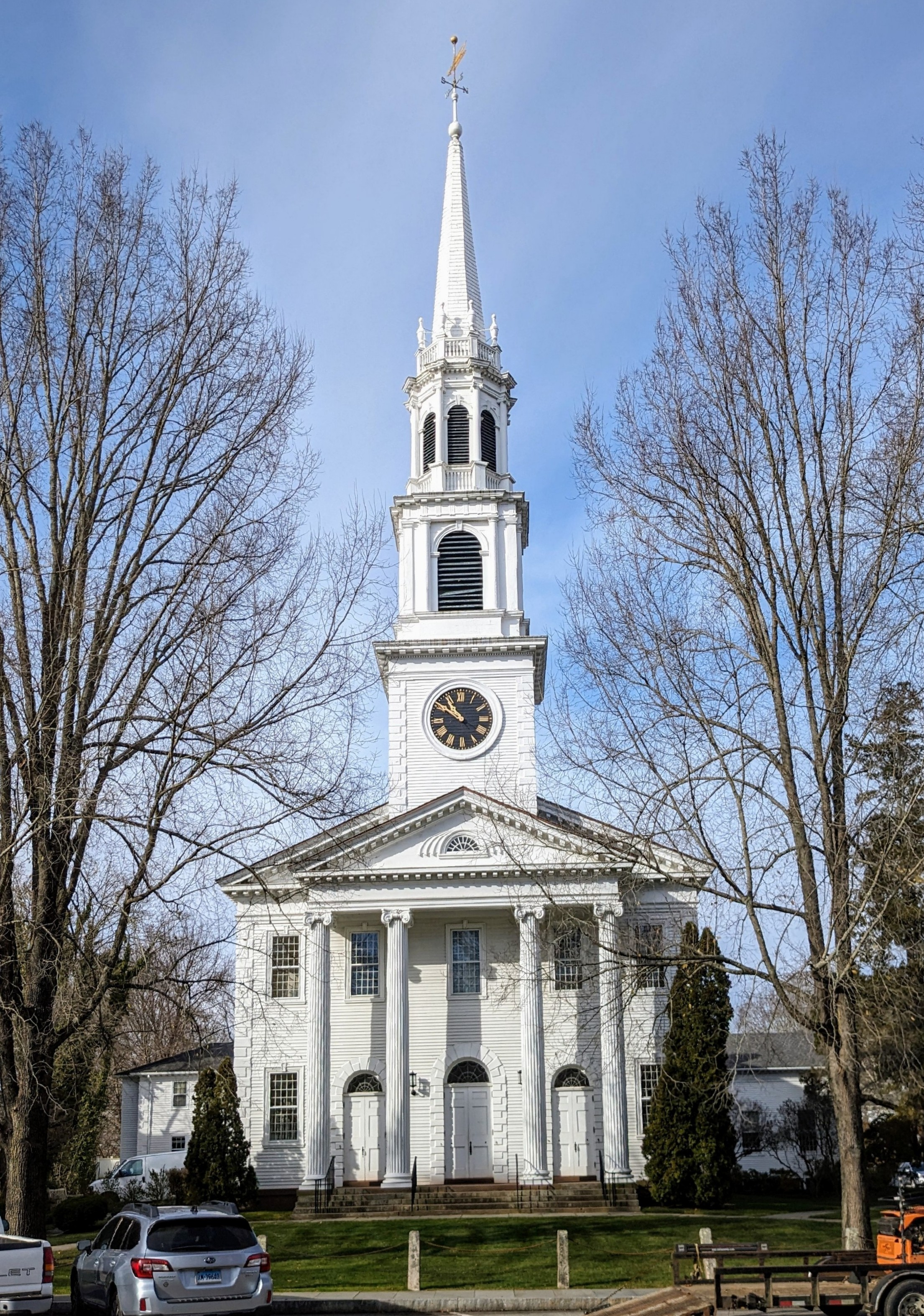
First Congregational Church of Old Lyme, Connecticut

Congregationalism (also Congregational Churches or Congregationalist Churches) is a Reformed (Calvinist) tradition of Protestant Christianity in which churches practise congregational government. Each congregation independently and autonomously runs its own affairs. These principles are enshrined in the Cambridge Platform (1648) and the Savoy Declaration (1658), Congregationalist confessions of faith. The Congregationalist Churches are a continuity of the theological tradition upheld by the Puritans. Their genesis was through the work of Congregationalist divines Robert Browne, Henry Barrowe, and John Greenwood.

In 16th-century England, the Puritan Reformation of the Church of England laid the foundation for such churches. There, the early Congregationalists were called Separatists or Independents to distinguish them from the similarly Calvinistic Presbyterians, whose churches embraced a polity based on the governance of elders; this commitment to self-governing congregations was codified in the Savoy Declaration. Congregationalism in the United States traces its origins to the Puritans of New England, who wrote the Cambridge Platform of 1648 to describe the autonomy of the church and its association with others. Within the United States, the model of Congregational churches was carried by migrating settlers from New England into New York, then into the Old Northwest, and further.

The Congregationalist tradition has a presence in the United States, Argentina, Ireland, and parts of the Commonwealth of Nations including the United Kingdom, Canada, South Africa, Australia, New Zealand, and various Pacific island nations. It has been introduced either by immigrant dissenters or by missionary organizations such as the London Missionary Society. A number of evangelical Congregational churches are members of the World Evangelical Congregational Fellowship. Congregationalism, as defined by the Pew Research Center, is estimated to represent 0.5 percent of the worldwide Protestant population.

== Beliefs ==
Congregationalism is a Reformed (Calvinist) tradition of Protestant Christianity that enjoins a church polity in which congregations are self-governing (cf. congregational polity). Through the centuries, Congregationalists have adopted various confessional statements, including the Savoy Declaration, the Cambridge Platform, and the Kansas City Statement of Faith.

Unlike Presbyterians, Congregationalists practise congregational polity (from which they derive their name), which holds that the members of a local church have the right to decide their church's forms of worship and confessional statements, choose their own officers, and administer their own affairs without any outside interference. Congregationalist polity is rooted in a foundational tenet of Congregationalism: the priesthood of all believers. According to Congregationalist minister Charles Edward Jefferson, this means that "Every believer is a priest and ... every seeking child of God is given directly wisdom, guidance, power".

Congregationalists have two sacraments: baptism and the Lord's Supper. They practise infant baptism, holding that "...there is no distinction between 'infant baptism' and 'believer's baptism'." The Lord's Supper is normally celebrated once or twice a month. Congregationalists do not invoke the intercession of saints. Certain Congregationalist hymns that have become popular across Christendom include "When I Survey the Wondrous Cross" and "Hark the Glad Sound".

== Origins ==
The origins of Congregationalism are found in 16th-century Puritanism, a movement that sought to complete the English Reformation begun with the separation of the Church of England from the Roman Catholic Church during the reign of Henry VIII (1509–47). During the reign of Elizabeth I (1558–1603), the Church of England was considered a Reformed church, but it also preserved certain characteristics of medieval Catholicism, such as cathedrals, church choirs, a formal liturgy contained in the Book of Common Prayer, traditional clerical vestments and episcopal polity (government by bishops).

The Puritans were Calvinists who wanted to further reform the church by abolishing all remaining Catholic practices, such as clerical vestments, wedding rings, organ music in church, kneeling at Holy Communion, using the term priest for a minister, bowing at the name of Jesus, and making the sign of the cross in baptism and communion. Many Puritans believed the Church of England should follow the example of Reformed churches in other parts of Europe and adopt presbyterian polity, in which an egalitarian network of local ministers cooperated through regional synods. Other Puritans experimented with congregational polity both within the Church of England and outside of it. Puritans who left the established church were known as Separatists.

Congregationalism may have first developed in the London Underground Church under Richard Fitz in the late 1560s and 1570s. The Congregational historian Albert Peel argued that it was accepted that the evidence for a fully thought out congregational ecclesiology is not overwhelming.

Robert Browne (1550–1633) was the first person to set out explicit congregational principles and is considered the founder of Congregationalism. While studying for ordination, Browne became convinced that the Church of England was a false church. He moved to Norwich and together with Robert Harrison formed an illegal Separatist congregation.

In 1581, Browne and his followers moved to Holland in order to worship freely. While in Holland, Browne wrote treatises that laid out the essential features of Congregationalism. Browne argued for a church only of genuine, regenerate believers and criticized the Anglicans for including all English people within their church. The congregation should choose its own leaders, and the ministers should be ordained by the congregation itself not by bishops or fellow ministers. Each congregation should be founded on a written church covenant, and the congregation as a whole should govern the church: "The meetings together… of every whole church, and of the elders therein, is above the apostle, above the prophet, the evangelist, the pastor, the teacher, and every particular elder" and "The voice of the whole people, guided by the elders and the forwardest, is said [in Scripture] to be the voice of God". While each church would be independent, separate churches would still come together to discuss matters of common concern.

Short lifespans were typical of Separatist churches (also known as Brownist congregations), small congregations who met in secret and faced persecution. They were often forced to go into exile in Holland and tended to disintegrate quickly. Notable Separatists who faced exile or death included Henry Barrow (c. 1550–1593), John Greenwood (died 1593), John Penry (1559–1593), Francis Johnson (1563–1618), and Henry Ainsworth (1571–1622).

In the early 1600s, a Separatist congregation in Scrooby in Nottinghamshire (the Scrooby Congregation) was formed through the efforts of the Puritan cleric John Smyth (who later rejected infant baptism and initiated the Baptist tradition). John Robinson was the congregation's pastor and William Brewster was an elder. In 1607, the congregation moved to Holland fleeing persecution. In 1620, the group (known in history as the Pilgrims) sailed to North America on the Mayflower, establishing the Plymouth Colony and bringing the Congregational tradition to America.

In 1639 William Wroth, then Rector of the parish church at Llanvaches in Monmouthshire, established the first Independent Church in Wales "according to the New England pattern", i.e. Congregational. The Tabernacle United Reformed Church at Llanvaches survives to this day.

During the English Civil War, those who supported the Parliamentary cause were invited by Parliament to discuss religious matters. The Westminster Confession of Faith (1646) was officially claimed to be the statement of faith for both the Church of England (Anglican/Episcopal) and Church of Scotland (Presbyterian), which was politically expedient for those in the Presbyterian dominated English Parliament who approved of the Solemn League and Covenant (1643).

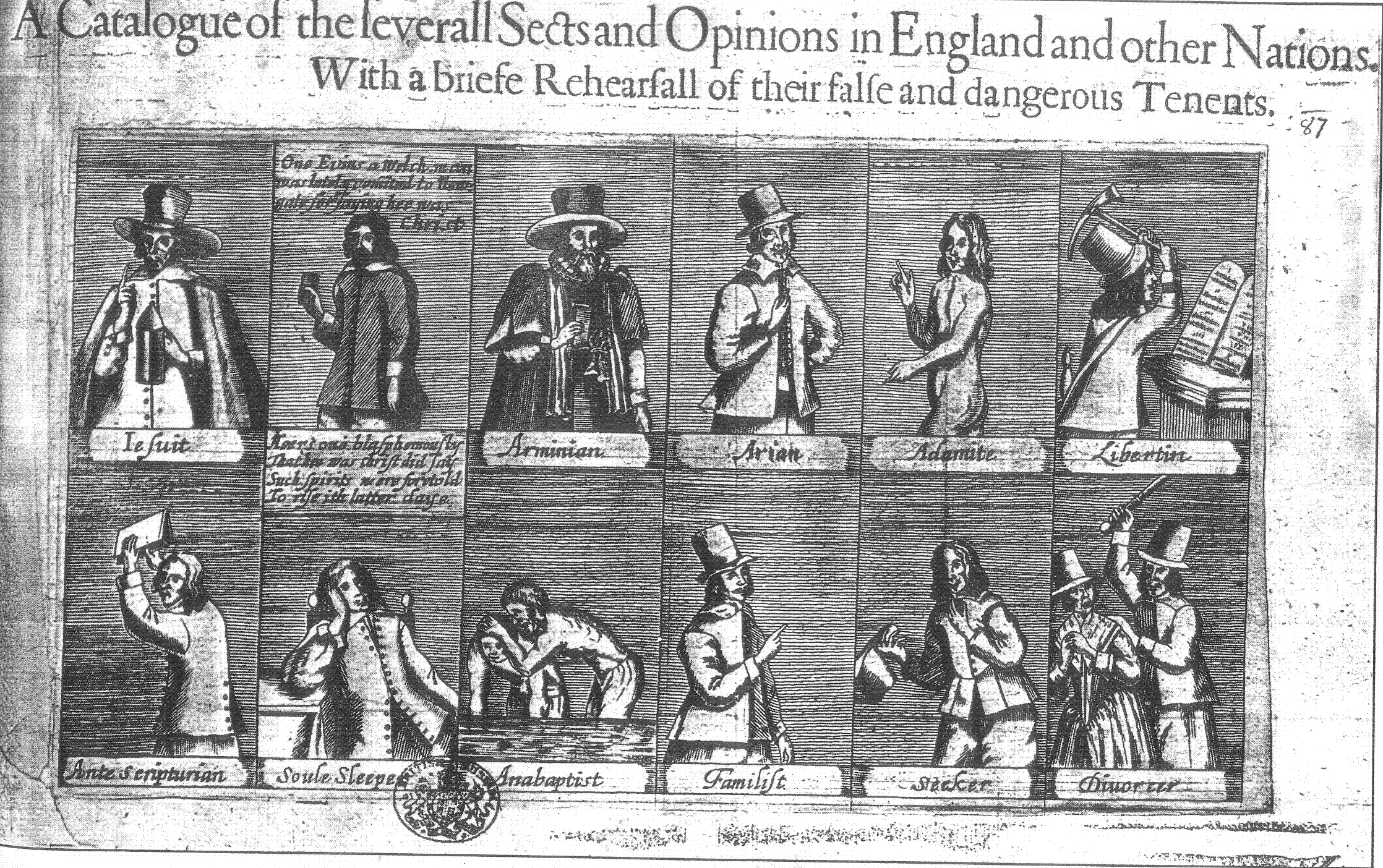
A Catalogue of the Several Sects and Opinions in England and other Nations: With a briefe Rehearsall of their false and dangerous Tenents, propaganda broadsheet denouncing English Dissenters from 1647

After the Second Civil War, the New Model Army which was dominated by Congregationalists (or Independents) seized control of the parliament with Pride's Purge (1648), arranged for the trial and execution of Charles I in January 1649 and subsequently introduced a republican Commonwealth dominated by Independents such as Oliver Cromwell. This government lasted until 1660 when the monarchy was restored and Episcopalism was re-established (see the Penal Laws and Great Ejection).

In 1662, two years after the Restoration, two thousand Independent, Presbyterian, and Baptist ministers were evicted from their parishes as dissenters and not being in Holy Orders conferred by bishops.

In 1658 (during the interregnum) the Congregationalists created their own version of the Westminster Confession, called the Savoy Declaration, which remains the principal subordinate standard of Congregationalism. (Note: For a summary of Congregationalism in Scotland, see the paper presented to a joint meeting of the ministers of the United Reformed Church (Scottish Synod) and the Congregational Federation in Scotland by Rev'd A. Paterson, which is available online.)

== By country ==
=== Argentina ===
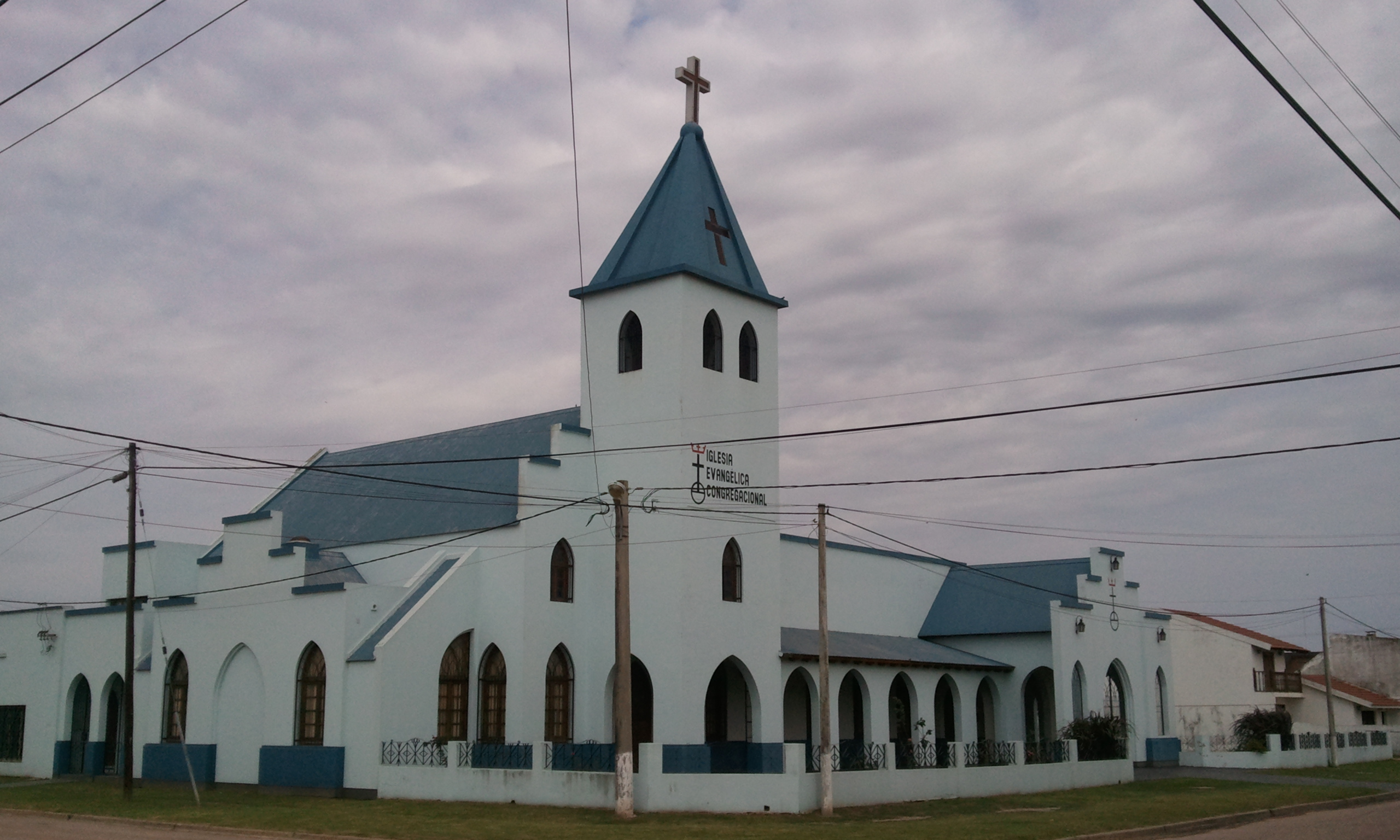
Iglesia Evangelica Congregacional, Coronel Du Graty, Argentina

The mission to Argentina was the second foreign field tended by German Congregationalists. The work in South America began in 1921 when four Argentine churches urgently requested that denominational recognition be given to George Geier, serving them. The Illinois Conference licensed Geier, who worked among Germans from Russia who were very similar to their kin in the United States and in Canada. The South American Germans from Russia had learned about Congregationalism in letters from relatives in the United States.

In 1924 general missionary John Hoelzer, while in Argentina for a brief visit, organised six churches. In the province of Entre Ríos, congregations began to join the Evangelical Congregational Church in Crespo. Information indicates that since 1923 there were activities in private homes and in 1928 the first pastoral house was inaugurated, in San Salvador from 1928, in Concordia, from 1929–1930, in Federal from 1934, in Paraná since the 1940's. In Concepción del Uruguay since 1942. Basavilbaso from 1944. Gualeguaychú from 1950. And then many more followed. In the province of Chaco, immigrants from Germany, Russia and neighbouring areas settled in Colonia Palmar, between Charata and General Pinedo. When they heard about the existence of the Evangelical Congregational Church, they contacted and invited the North American missionary Guillermo Strauch to visit them. This took place on August 25, 1928, when the first service was held and as a result of the meeting they decided to join the I. E. C. The following year, their first church was inaugurated. Due to a great drought, in 1945 this church had to close its doors, and the families emigrated to Villa Ángela, Coronel Du Graty or Santa Sylvina, in the province of Chaco, or to El Colorado, in Formosa. In each of these places, new faith communities emerged from the relocation of members of Colonia Palmar. In Villa Ángela, the first church was actually established in Colonia Juan José Paso in 1947, and two years later the first church was inaugurated. In Coronel Du Graty, it originated from prayer meetings in 1947 (with those who came from Colonia Palmar) in "Campo Ugarte" and "Campo Ñandubay". Later they joined together to build their own place for worship, which happened in 1954. In the province of Misiones, in Leandro N. Alem and the surrounding area, immigrants from Poland, Germany and Brazil began to arrive between 1929 and 1938. Although their economic condition was precarious, they were rich in their desire to work, to progress and in their spirituality. They began to hold prayer meetings, and faith communities were formed in Alem Sud, Picada Almafuerte and Picada Flor (Colonia El Chatón).

In 1932 a group of these believers adopted the name of "Congregation of Evangelical Brothers" and when they began the process of registration in the National Register of Cults, they became aware of the Evangelical Congregational Church, decided to join it, and in 1935 the North American missionary, Pastor Federico Gross visited them for an Extraordinary Assembly, where they approved their statutes with the name of "Evangelical Lutheran Congregational Church". This consolidated their union with the IEC of Argentina. In other cities of Misiones the Congregational work began in Oberá in the 1930s, in San Francisco de Asís a work began with believers from Brazil in 1935, in Dos de Mayo since 1945, in Valle Hermoso a group of Lutheran origin joined the Evangelical Congregational Church in 1949, in El Soberbio since 1950, in San Vicente since 1966, in Posadas since 1970 and later many more congregations.

In Buenos Aires, as a result of the migration of congregational members from the interior of the country, it was started in Rivadavia 6001 in the Autonomous City of Buenos Aires, in 1937 by the missionary Federico Gross. From that moment on they received pastoral care from Entre Ríos. In 1946 the missionary Otto Tiede organised the first board of directors in the Colegiales neighbourhood, when the congregation met in the church "El Buen Pastor", which was lent to them by the Disciples of Christ. In 1947, Pastor Ludwig Serfas became the first local pastor, with residence in Olivos, and it was decided to build the first church in Villa Ballester, which was inaugurated in 1950.

The Evangelical Congregational Church spread to Córdoba in 1972, with itinerant missionary work from Basavilbaso (Entre Ríos). In the province of Santa Fe from 1980, from Paraná (Entre Ríos). In Corrientes (capital) from 1982 and in CABA a missionary work started in 1995. In the first 100 years, it has spread from Entre Ríos to several provinces: Misiones, Corrientes, Chaco, Formosa, Córdoba, Santa Fe, Buenos Aires and CABA. It has spread to southern Brazil, Paraguay and Uruguay. It is currently present in more than 150 towns and cities in Argentina.

It has a social commitment, working among vulnerable, deprived and marginalised groups. It serves in the containment of families in varied contexts. With specific programmes for children, adolescents, young people, married couples and the elderly and presence in formal and informal education, training and instructing people of all ages in arts and crafts, and values and principles for solidarity, human rights, and a better quality of life for all, according to the possibilities and opportunities. It also runs canteens and picnic areas, with an integral pastoral care, which includes accompaniment in hospitals and prisons. It has a Higher Biblical Institute that offers an official degree: "Profesorado en Ciencias Sagradas".

=== Australia ===
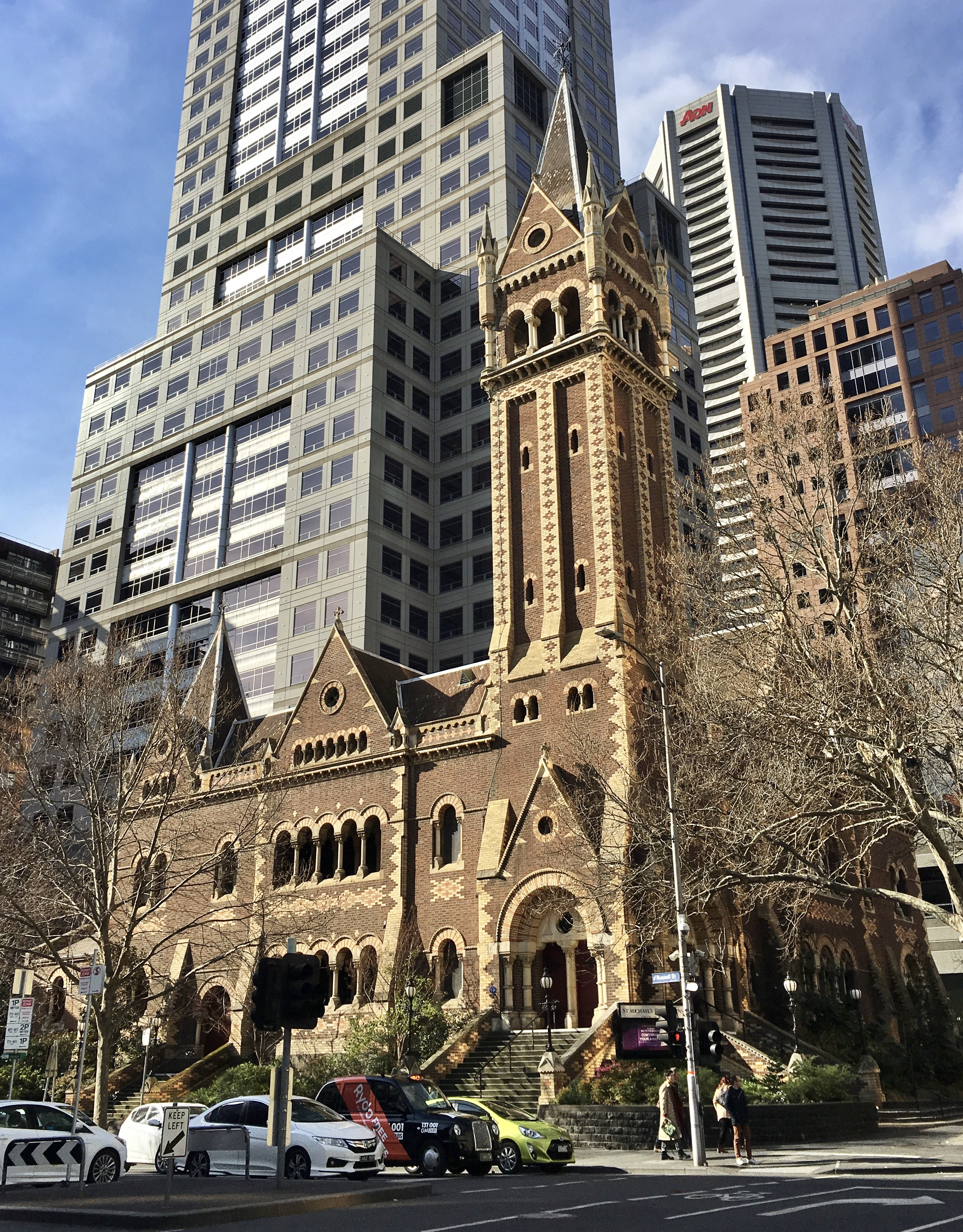
St Michael's Church in Melbourne

In 1977, most congregations of the Congregational Union of Australia merged with all Churches of the Methodist Church of Australasia and a majority of Churches of the Presbyterian Church of Australia to form the Uniting Church in Australia.

Those congregations that did not join the Uniting Church formed the Fellowship of Congregational Churches or continued as Presbyterians. Some more ecumenically minded Congregationalists left the Fellowship of Congregational Churches in 1995 and formed the Congregational Federation of Australia.

=== Bulgaria ===
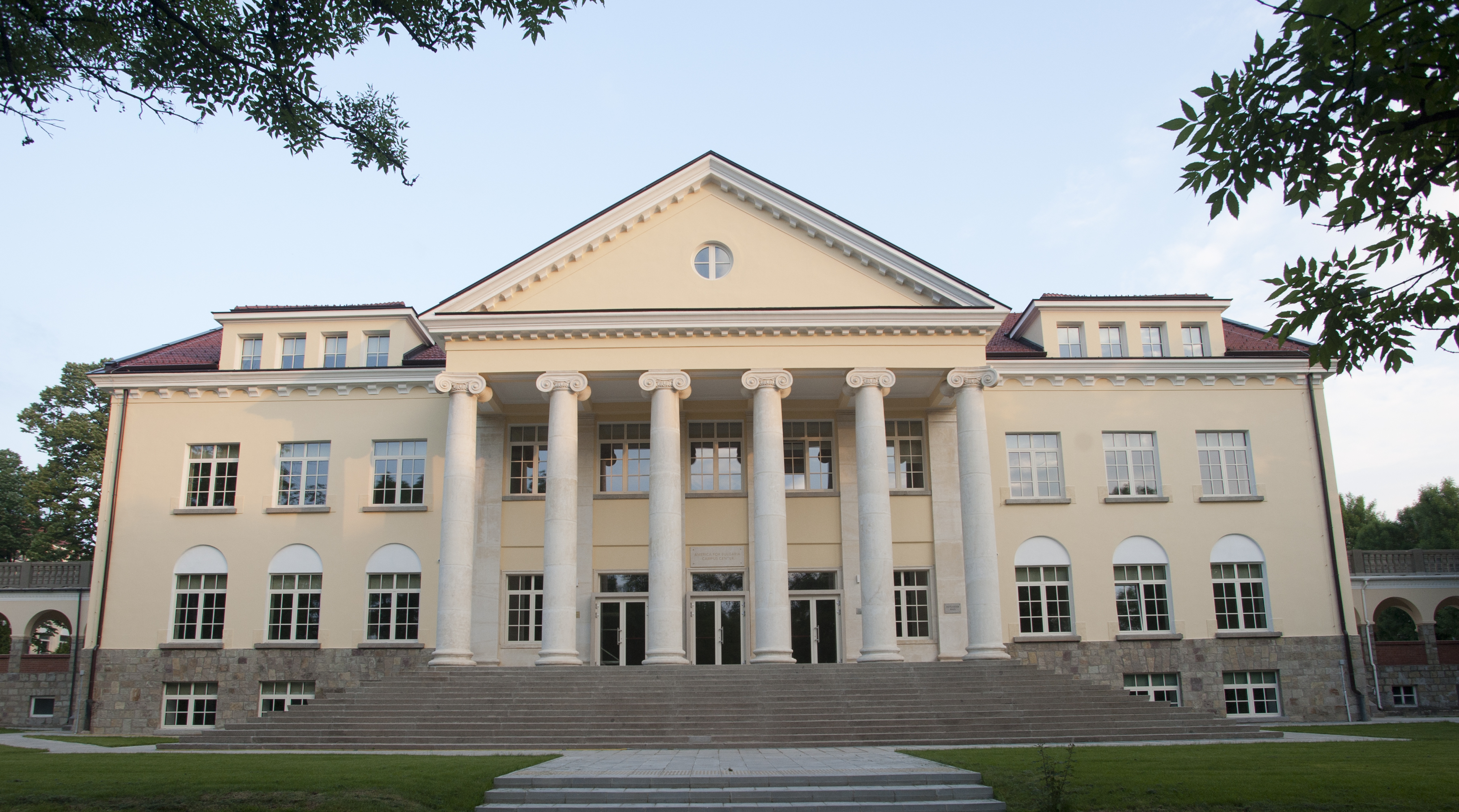
The American College of Sofia was founded by Congregationalists

Congregationalists (called "Evangelicals" in Bulgaria; the word "Protestant" is not used) were among the first Protestant missionaries to the Ottoman Empire and to the Northwestern part of the European Ottoman Empire which is now Bulgaria, where their work to convert these Orthodox Christians was unhampered by the death penalty imposed by the Ottomans on Muslim converts to Christianity. These missionaries were significant contributors to the Bulgarian National Revival movement. Today, Protestantism in Bulgaria represents the third largest religious group, behind Orthodox and Muslim. Missionaries from the United States first arrived in 1857–58, sent to Istanbul by the American Board of Commissioners for Foreign Missions (ABCFM). The ABCFM was proposed in 1810 by the Congregationalist graduates of Williams College, MA, and was chartered in 1812 to support missions by Congregationalists, Presbyterian (1812–1870), Dutch-Reformed (1819–1857) and other denominational members. The ABCFM focused its efforts on southern Bulgaria and the Methodist Church on the region north of the Balkan Mountains (Stara Planina, or "Old Mountains").

In 1857, Cyrus Hamlin and Charles Morse established three missionary centres in southern Bulgaria – in Odrin (Edirne, former capital city of the Ottoman Empire, in Turkey), Plovdiv and Stara Zagora. They were joined in 1859 by Russian-born naturalized America Frederic Flocken in 1859. American Presbyterian minister Elias Riggs commissioned, supported and edited the work of Bulgarian monk Neofit Rilski to create a Bible translations into Bulgarian which was then distributed widely in Bulgaria in 1871 and thereafter. This effort was supported by Congregationalist missionary Albert Long, Konstantin Fotinov, Hristodul Sechan-Nikolov and Petko Slaveikov. Reportedly, 2,000 copies of the newly translated Bulgarian language New Testament were sold within the first two weeks.

Congregational churches were established in Bansko, Veliko Turnovo, and Svishtov between 1840 and 1878, followed by Sofia in 1899. By 1909, there were 19 Congregational churches, with a total congregation of 1,456 in southern Bulgaria offering normal Sunday services, Sunday schools for children, biblical instruction for adults; as well as women's groups and youth groups. Summer Bible schools were held annually from 1896 to 1948.

Congregationalists led by James F. Clarke opened Bulgaria's first Protestant primary school for boys in Plovdiv in 1860, followed three years later by a primary school for girls in Stara Zagora. In 1871 the two schools were moved to Samokov and merged as the American College, now considered the oldest American educational institution outside the US. In 1928, new facilities were constructed in Sofia, and the Samokov operation transferred to the American College of Sofia (ACS), now operated at a very high level by the Sofia American Schools, Inc.

In 1874, a Bible College was opened in Ruse, Bulgaria for people wanting to become pastors. At the 1876 annual conference of missionaries, the beginning of organizational activity in the country was established. The evangelical churches of Bulgaria formed a united association in 1909.

The missionaries played a significant role in assisting the Bulgarians throw off "the Turkish Yoke", which included publishing the magazine Zornitsa (Зорница, "Dawn"), founded in 1864 by the initiative of Riggs and Long. Zornitsa became the most powerful and most widespread newspaper of the Bulgarian Renaissance. A small roadside marker on Bulgarian Highway 19 in the Rila Mountains, close to Gradevo commemorates the support given the Bulgarian Resistance by these early Congregationalist missionaries.

On 3 September 1901 Congregationalist missionaries came to world attention in the Miss Stone Affair when missionary Ellen Maria Stone, of Roxbury, Massachusetts, and her pregnant fellow missionary friend Macedonian-Bulgarian Katerina Stefanova–Tsilka, wife of an Albanian Protestant minister, were kidnapped while traveling between Bansko and Gorna Dzhumaya (now Blagoevgrad), by an Internal Macedonian-Adrianople Revolutionary Organization detachment led by the voivoda Yane Sandanski and the sub-voivodas Hristo Chernopeev and Krǎstyo Asenov and ransomed to provide funds for revolutionary activities. Eventually, a heavy ransom (14,000 Ottoman lira (about US$62,000 at 1902 gold prices or $5 million at 2012 gold prices) raised by public subscription in the USA was paid on 18 January 1902 in Bansko and the hostages (now including a newborn baby) were released on 2 February near Strumica—a full five months after being kidnapped. Widely covered by the media at the time, the event has been often dubbed "America's first modern hostage crisis".

The Bulgarian royal house, of Catholic German extraction, was unsympathetic to the American inspired Protestants, and this mood became worse when Bulgaria sided with Germany in WWI and WWII. Matters became much worse when the Bulgarian Communist Party took power in 1944. Like the royal family, it too saw Protestantism closely linked to the West and hence more politically dangerous than traditional Orthodox Christianity. This prompted repressive legislation in the form of "Regulations for the Organization and Administration of the Evangelical Churches in the People's Republic of Bulgaria" and resulted in the harshest government repression, possibly the worst in the entire Eastern Bloc, intended to extinguish Protestantism altogether. Mass arrests of pastors (and often their families), torture, long prison sentences (including four life sentences) and even disappearance were common. Similar tactics were used on parishioners.

In fifteen highly publicized mock show-trials between 8 February and 8 March 1949, all the accused pastors confessed to a range of charges against them, including treason, spying (for both the US and Yugoslavia), black marketing, and various immoral acts. State appointed pastors were foisted on surviving congregations. As late as the 1980s, imprisonment and exile were still employed to destroy the remaining Protestant churches. The Congregationalist magazine "Zornitsa" was banned; Bibles became unobtainable. As a result, the number of Congregationalists is small and estimated by Paul Mojzes in 1982 to number about 5,000, in 20 churches. (Total Protestants in Bulgaria were estimated in 1965 to have been between 10,000 and 20,000.) More recent estimates indicate enrollment in Protestant ("Evangelical" or "Gospel") churches of between 100,000 and 200,000, presumably reflecting the success of more recent missionary efforts of evangelical groups.

=== Canada ===
In Canada, the first foreign field, 31 churches that had been affiliated with the General Conference became part of the United Church of Canada when that denomination was founded in 1925 by the merger of the Canadian Congregationalist and Methodist churches, and two-thirds of the congregations of the Presbyterian Church in Canada. In 1988, a number of UCC congregations separated from the national church, which they felt was moving away theologically and in practice from Biblical Christianity. Many of the former UCC congregations banded together as the new Congregational Christian Churches in Canada.

The Congregational Christian Churches in Canada (or 4Cs) is an evangelical, Protestant, Christian denomination, headquartered in Brantford, Ontario, and a member of the World Evangelical Congregational Fellowship. The name "congregational" generally describes its preferred organizational style, which promotes local church autonomy and ownership, while fostering fellowship and accountability between churches at the National level.

=== Ireland ===
The Congregational Union of Ireland was founded in 1829 and currently has around 26 member churches. In 1899 it absorbed the Irish Evangelical Society.

=== Samoa ===
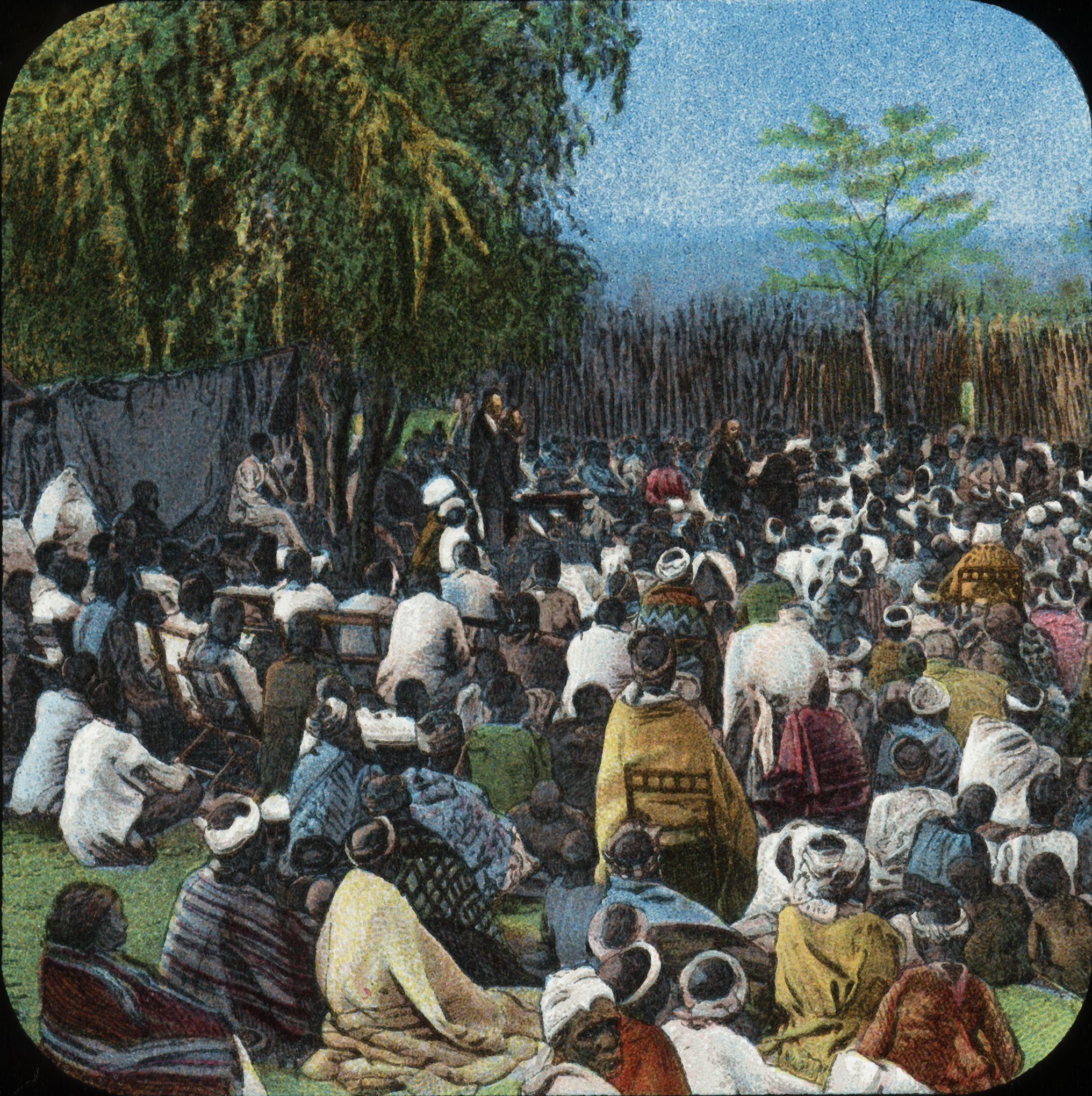
The London Missionary Society preaching to native peoples of Oceania

The Congregational Christian Church of Samoa is one of the largest group of churches throughout the Pacific Region. It was founded in 1830 by the London Missionary Society missionary John Williams on the island of Savai'i in the village of Sapapali'i. As the church grew it established and continues to support theological colleges in Samoa and Fiji. There are over 100,000 members attending over 2,000 congregations throughout the world, most of which are located in Samoa, American Samoa, New Zealand, Australia and America. The Christian Congregational Church of Jamaica falls under the constitution of the Samoan Church.

=== South Africa ===
Congregational churches were brought to the Cape Colony by British settlers.

=== United Kingdom ===
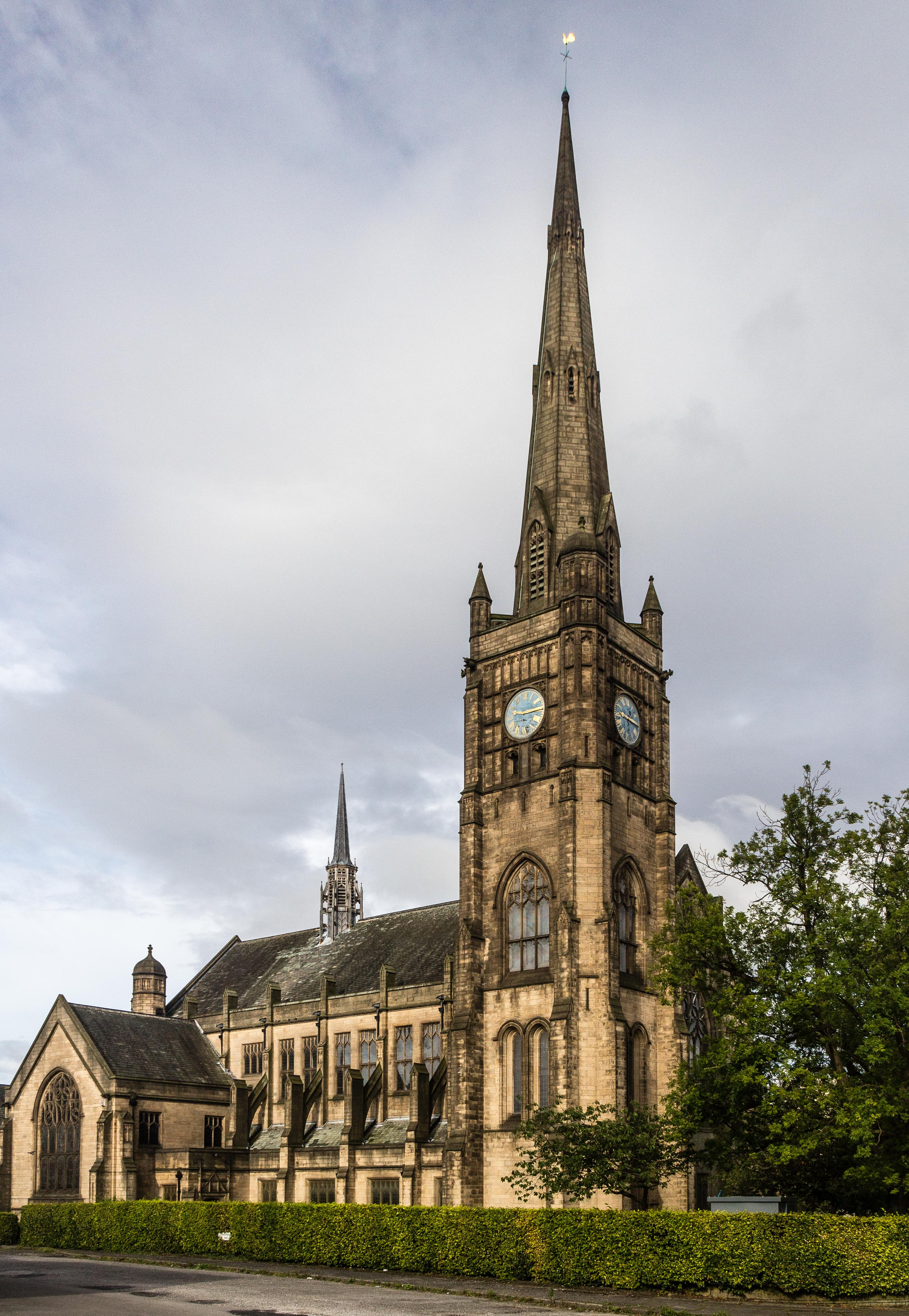
Albion Congregational Church in Ashton-Under-Lyne

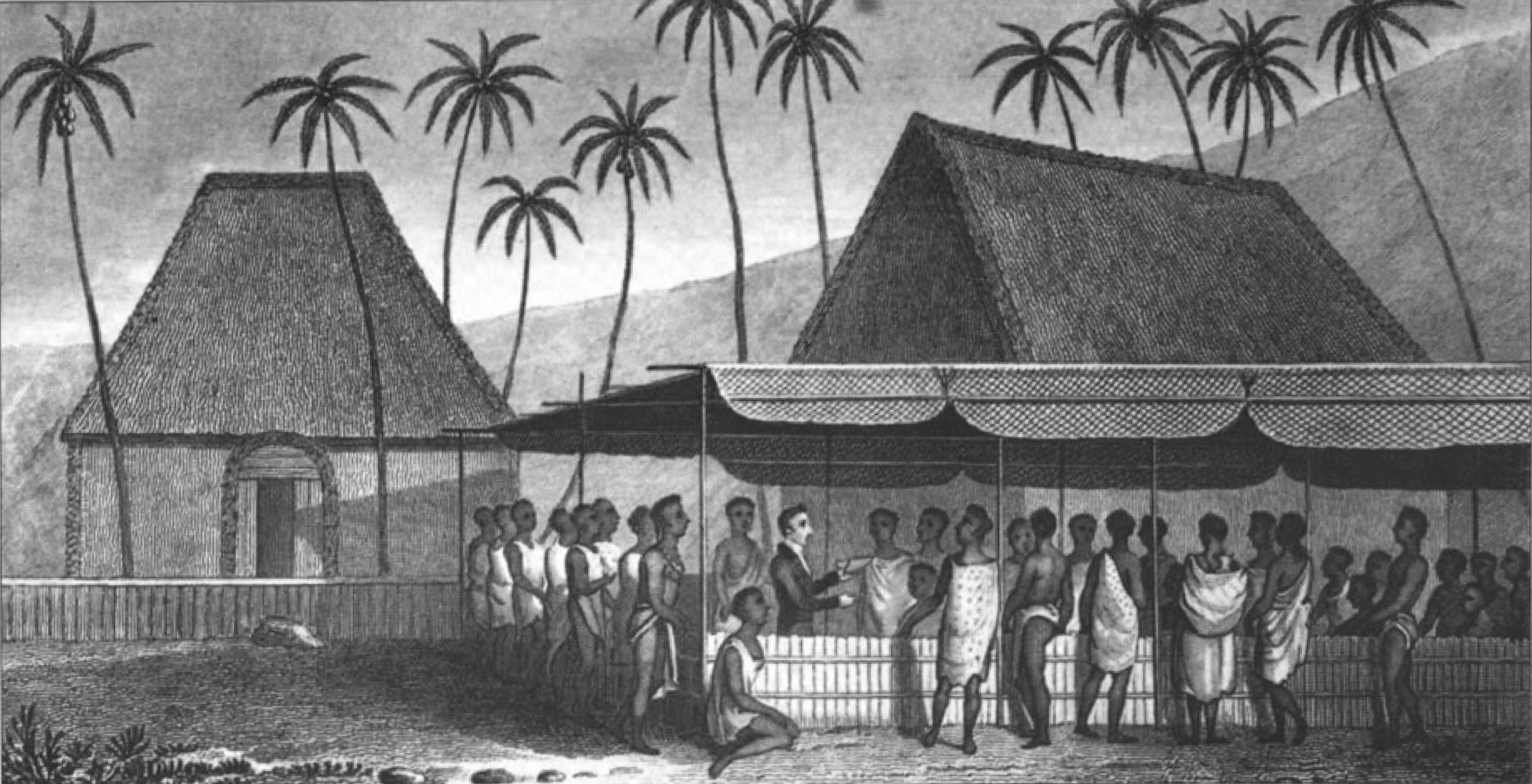
William Ellis preaching to the natives, Hawaii, c. 1823

The Congregational Union of England and Wales was established in 1831. It had no authority over the affiliated churches, but instead aimed to advise and support them. In 1972, about three-quarters of English Congregational churches merged with the Presbyterian Church of England to form the United Reformed Church (URC). However, about 600 Congregational churches have continued in their historic independent tradition. Under the United Reformed Church Act 1972 (c. xviii), which dealt with the financial and property issues arising from the merger between what had become by then the Congregational Church of England and Wales and the Presbyterian Church of England, certain assets were divided between the various parties.

In England, there are three main groups of continuing Congregationalists. These are the Congregational Federation, which has offices in Nottingham and Manchester, the Evangelical Fellowship of Congregational Churches, which has offices in Beverley, and about 100 Congregational churches that are loosely federated with other congregations in the Fellowship of Independent Evangelical Churches, or are unaffiliated. The unaffiliated churches' share of the assets of the Congregational Union/Church of England and Wales is administered by a registered charity, the Unaffiliated Congregational Churches Charities, which supports the unaffiliated churches and their retired ministers.

In 1981, the United Reformed Church merged with the re-formed Association of Churches of Christ and, in 2000, just over half of the churches in the Congregational Union of Scotland also joined the United Reformed Church (via the United Reformed Church Act 2000). The remainder of Congregational churches in Scotland joined the Congregational Federation.

Wales traditionally is the part which has the largest share of Congregationalists among the population, most Congregationalists being members of Undeb yr Annibynwyr Cymraeg (the Union of Welsh Independents), which is particularly important in Carmarthenshire and Brecknockshire.

The London Missionary Society was effectively the world mission arm of British Congregationalists, sponsoring missionaries including Eric Liddell and David Livingstone. After mergers and changes of name, the Society was succeeded in 1977 by the worldwide Council for World Mission.

=== United States ===
In the United States, the Congregational tradition traces its origins mainly to Puritan settlers of colonial New England. Congregational churches have had an important role in the political, religious and cultural history of the United States - in many of the colonies they were the established church. Their practices concerning church governance influenced the early development of democratic institutions in New England, and some of the nation's oldest educational institutions, such as Harvard and Yale University, were founded to train Congregational clergy. In the 21st century, the Congregational tradition is represented by the United Church of Christ, the National Association of Congregational Christian Churches, Conservative Congregational Christian Conference, the Evangelical Association and many unaffiliated local churches. Some congregations and denominations are conservative on social issues, (e.g. CCCC) while others are liberal (e.g. UCC).

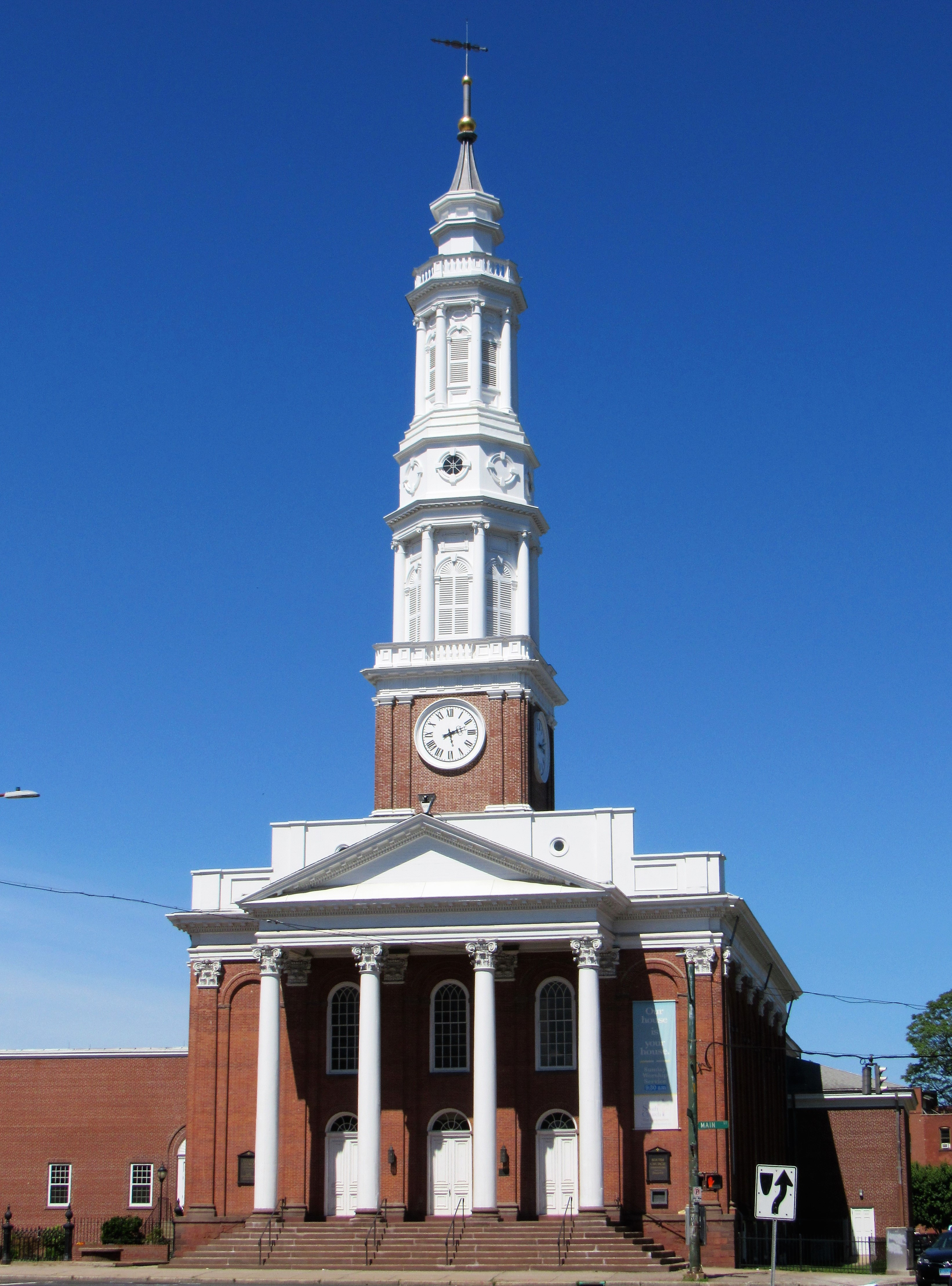
South Congregational Church in Hartford, Connecticut

== See also ==
- Arminianism
- Continental Reformed church
- Fellowship of Independent Evangelical Churches
- List of Congregational churches
- Reformed Baptists
