= John Robinson (pastor) =

English pastor (1576–1625)

The Reverend John Robinson
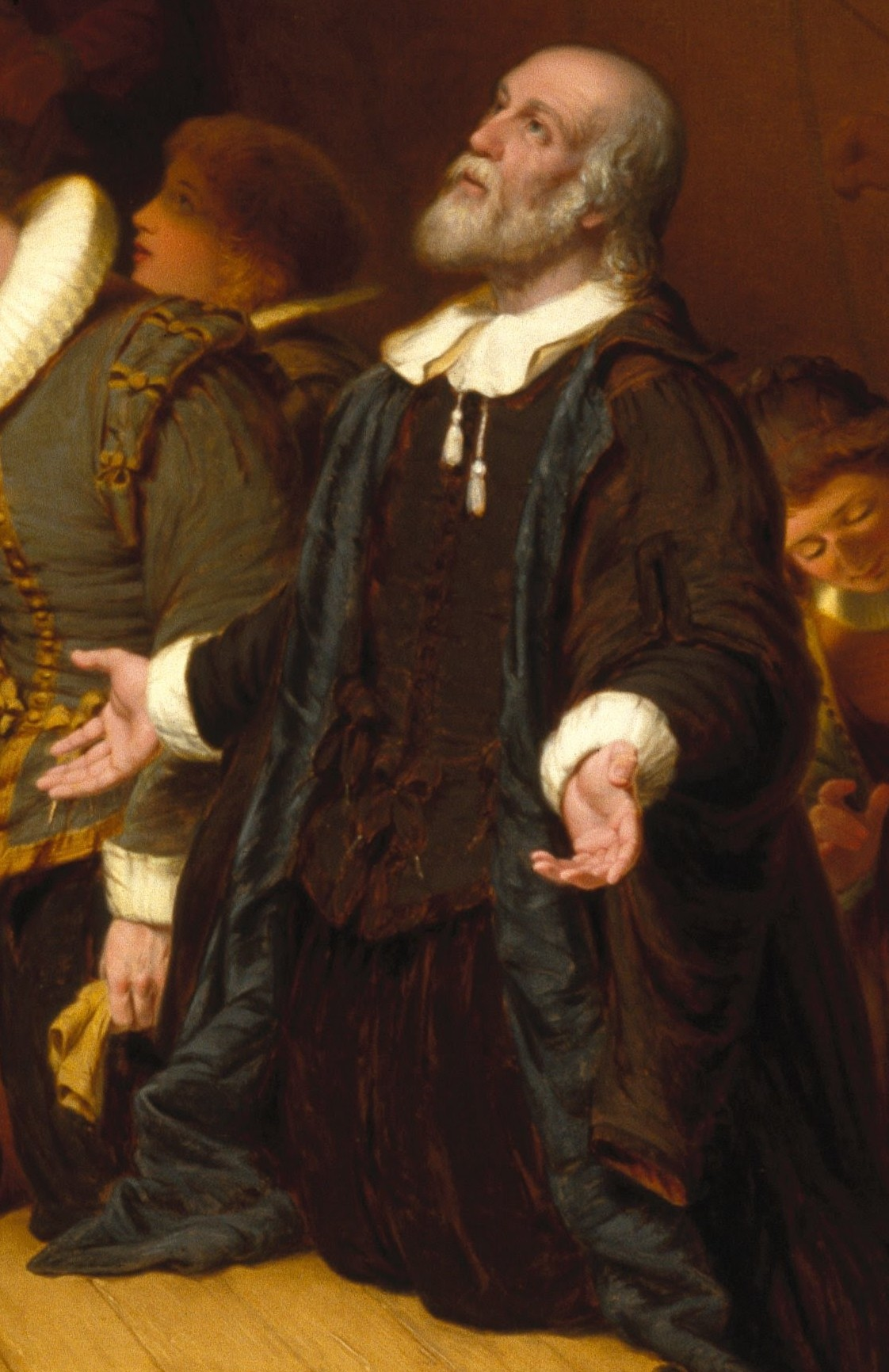
- 19th century depiction of Robinson leading prayer in Embarkation of the Pilgrims
- Born: 1576; Sturton le Steeple, Nottinghamshire, England
- Died: 1625 (aged 48–49)

Signature
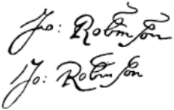

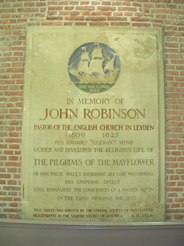
Historical marker to the memory of John Robinson near where he is buried at the Pieterskerk, Leiden, Netherlands

John Robinson (1576–1625) was an English Separatist Puritan minister, known as the "Pastor of the Pilgrims", before they left on the Mayflower. He is regarded as one of the main early leaders of Brownism and, along with Robert Browne and Henry Barrow, as one of the founders of the Congregationalist Church.

== Early life ==
Robinson was born at Sturton le Steeple in Nottinghamshire, England, between March and September 1576, this range of dates deduced by comparing two records at Leiden (Leyden), Netherlands, that give his age at the time of the event. The village was also the birthplace of the martyr of 1546, John Lassells, and the Separatist theologian John Smyth. He entered Corpus Christi College at the University of Cambridge in April 1592. He received his Bachelor of Arts degree in 1596. In May 1598 he was admitted a Fellow of his college and ordained a priest of the Church of England. This was followed in 1599 by his Master of Arts. Following the attainment of his Master's degree, he obtained two positions at Corpus: Praelector Graecus, a lectureship in Greek, and Decanus, a post involving student oversight.

== Dissent ==
Cambridge was a centre of Puritanism. During his years there, Robinson gradually accepted its principles. The leaders of this movement strongly criticised the English Church because they believed its beliefs and rituals were too much like those of the Roman Catholic Church. The reforms they advocated would "purify" the established church from within; for this reason they became known as "Puritans".

Some Puritans, who despaired getting the changes they favoured in the established church, decided to leave to form Separatist churches.

== Measures against dissent ==
The monarch, then as now, was the Supreme Governor of the Church of England. Under Elizabeth I Brownists had been imprisoned for their separation from the state church, and some executed, including Barrow. When James I succeeded her in 1603, he continued her policy of enforcing religious conformity. All Puritans would, he warned, adhere or he would "harry them out of the land". It was the King's belief that his throne depended on the Church hierarchy: "No Bishop, no King".

James I enforced the Religion Act 1592 (35 Eliz. 1. c. 1), which made it illegal for Brownists to hold their own services. Anyone who did not attend the services of the Church of England for forty days, and who attended private services

“contrary to the laws and statutes of the realm and being thereof lawfully convicted shall be committed to prison, there to remain without bail mainprise until they shall confirm and yield themselves to same church.”

When Richard Bancroft became Archbishop of Canterbury in December 1604 he required all ministers and preachers to subscribe to 141 canons, which included declarations that the Prayer Book and episcopacy were biblically sound, or be deprived. Up to 300 ministers were suspended and 80 of them deprived, although later recanted.

== St Andrew's Church ==
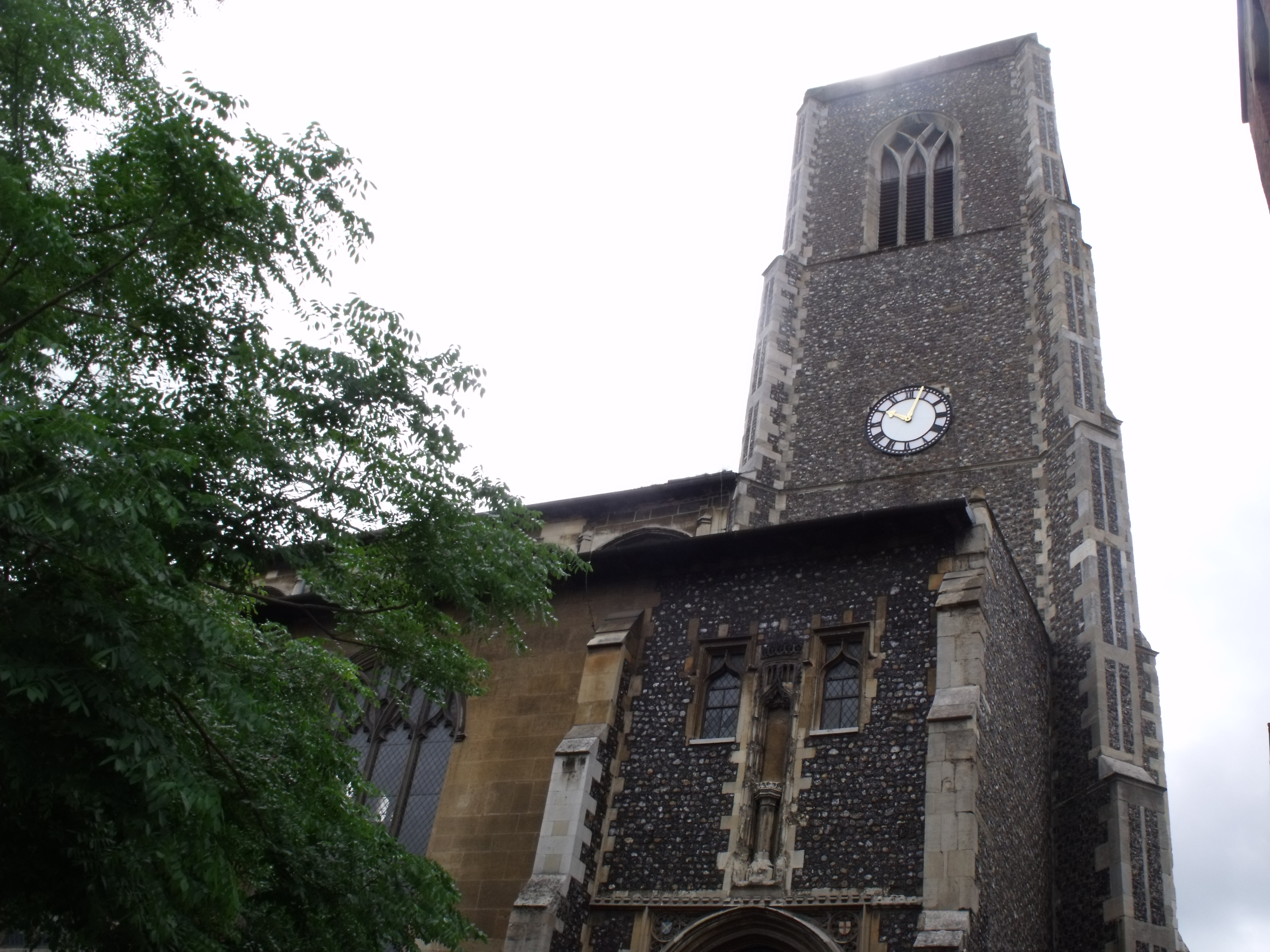
St Andrew's Church, Norwich

College fellows were prohibited from marrying so Robinson resigned his fellowship to wed Bridget White, on 15 February 1604 at St Mary's Church, Greasley in western Nottinghamshire. Bridget was the daughter of Alexander and Eleanor (Smith) White, formerly prosperous yeoman farmers at Sturton le Steeple, who were deceased at the time of the wedding. At her marriage, Bridget was residing near Greasley on land held under a 99-year lease by her older brother Charles, who had inherited the lease by their father's will.

In August 1603, Robinson became associate pastor of St Andrew's Church in the commercial centre of Norwich, after he preached a sermon there denouncing episcopal courts. His joint ministry with Thomas Newhouse was so popular that the church added extra seating.

The city of Norwich had contacts on the continent with Holland and Flanders and had a considerable number of foreign workers and refugees. In addition, the most influential political leaders and merchants in Norwich were Puritans.

During Robinson's first year at St Andrew's, James I issued a proclamation enforcing Bancroft's 141 canons. Newhouse conformed, but Robinson was suspended. He tried unsuccessfully to gain the mastership of the Great Hospital in Norwich. He subsequently preached privately at various locations in northern Nottinghamshire, including in the Spring of 1605 at his home village of Sturton le Steeple.

== Leaving the established church ==
Robinson wrestled with the question of leaving the Church of England, and travelled widely to consult with the most respected Puritan authorities. He respected their decision to stay, but also read Separatist books and felt their call to separate ‘as a burning fire shut up in my bones’. He took part in the Conference of Coventry, in 1606, concerning dissenting, at the mansion of the Puritan Isabel Bowes, with other Puritans including John Smyth, Richard Bernard and Thomas Helwys.

Robinson was finally persuaded to leave the established church by Smyth, but Smyth led other Puritans in Gainsborough. Robinson and his followers organized a Separatist church, along with Richard Clifton, making covenant with God ‘to walk in all his ways made known, or to be made known, unto them, according to their best endeavours, whatsoever it should cost them, the Lord assisting them’.

The Scrooby Congregation met at the residence of William Brewster, Scrooby Manor. Brewster was the local postmaster and bailiff, and he was instrumental in the formation of the church. He was an old friend of Robinson as well as a Cambridge alumnus. Other members included the 16-year-old William Bradford.

== Attempts to leave England ==
The new churches faced imprisonment, like other Brownists, and in the autumn of 1607, the Scrooby Congregation decided to emigrate to the Netherlands. A large Brownist congregation, the Ancient Church, had moved to Amsterdam from London in 1593, led by Francis Johnson and Henry Ainsworth, and were able to worship as they chose. The churches of Robinson and Smyth secretly packed their belongings, and set out on foot for the sixty mile journey to the port town of Boston, Lincolnshire. Awaiting them was a sea captain, who had agreed to smuggle them out of the country.

But, before the congregation arrived at Boston, the captain betrayed them to the authorities. The Brownists were searched, their money taken, and their belongings ransacked. They were put on display for the crowds and confined in cells on the first floor of the Boston Guildhall. During the month of their imprisonment, the magistrates treated them well. Richard Clyfton, William Brewster, and John Robinson were the last to be released.

The second attempt to flee to the Netherlands went wrong when the boat carrying the women and children got stuck in mud, horsemen came to seize the pilgrims, and the ship's captain fled, taking the men to Amsterdam alone. The women and children were imprisoned but later allowed to join the men.

== Period in The Netherlands ==
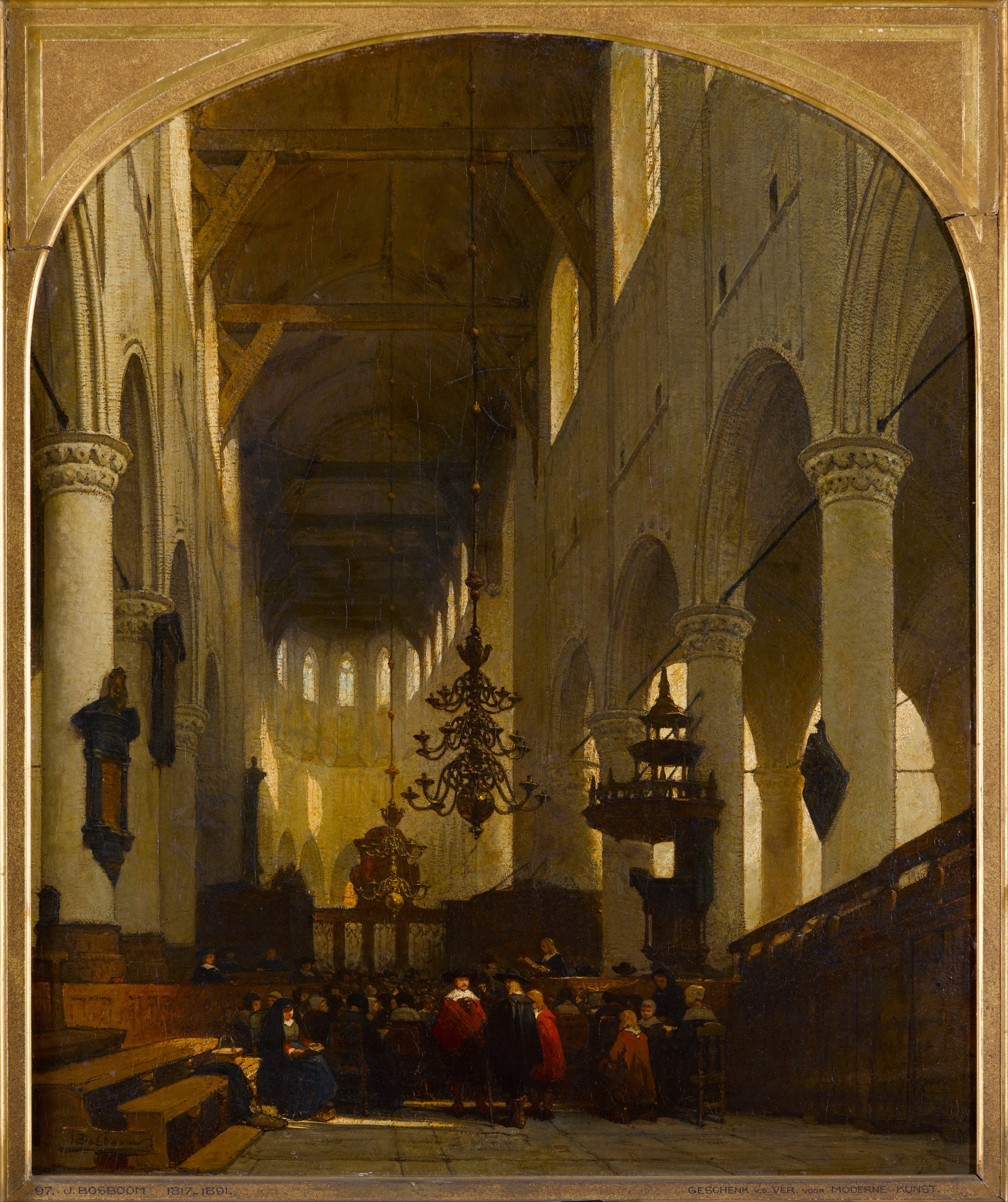
The Pieterskerk, Leiden by Johannes Bosboom

Robinson's congregation initially settled at Amsterdam alongside Smyth and the Ancient Church. When Smyth's church became Baptists though, in January 1609, Robinson and about 100 followers petitioned the City of Leiden for permission to resettle there by 1 May 1609, the latter date being the Dutch "moving day."

Leiden was a bustling city in 1609. It contained a number of imposing buildings, and was one of Europe's most important centres of learning. Some of the most important scholars of the day were on the faculty of the University of Leiden, and it attracted students from all over western Europe as well as England.

Soon after the congregation resettled at Leiden, William Brewster became ruling elder. Under the leadership of Robinson and Brewster, the congregation grew steadily, and in time the congregation grew to 300 members. The historian of Separatism Stephen Tomkins says: 'uniquely among Brownist churches in the Netherlands they never suffered splits ... It would perhaps be fair to say that he alone among them all, though he was not an intellectual pioneer of freedom, did know how to use it [freedom] right.'

When the Ancient Church split in 1610, the Leiden church sent Robinson and Brewster to mediate or arbitrate between Johnson and Ainsworth. Around 1611 Robinson hosted a group of puritans in exile, including Henry Jacob, and was persuaded, unlike other Brownists, 'that it is permissible to pray privately with godly members of the false church'.

In January 1611, Robinson, William Jepson, Henry Wood, and Robinson's sister-in-law Jane White, signed a contract to purchase for 8,000 guilders property called the "Groene Poort" or Green Gate near the Pieterskerk (St Peter's Church) and within short walking distance of the University of Leiden. The purchase was completed on 12 May 1611 with a 2,000 guilder downpayment and mortgage for the balance to be paid annually at the rate of 500 guilders, the first payment due in May 1612. In the meantime, in April 1611 at Leiden, Jane White married Randulph (i.e., Ralph) Thickens, with Thickens replacing wife Jane as the fourth named party to the purchase mortgage. Unlike other non-Dutch Reformed Church congregations at Leiden whose religious facilities were owned, funded and their ministers compensated by the Dutch state, no church structure or funding was ever requested or provided to the Leiden Separatists. Thus, the property that Robinson and his associates purchased served both as the Robinson home and a church. Over the next several years, twenty-one apartments were constructed in the rear garden for less affluent members of the congregation.

In 1617, Robinson's church started a secret printing operation, which included books such as Perth Assembly by David Calderwood which so incensed James I it provoked an international manhunt for the author and printer.

== At the University of Leiden ==
On 5 September 1615, John Robinson entered Leiden University as a student of theology. He attended the lectures of the noted theologians, Simon Episcopius and Johannes Polyander. His entry into the university "freed him from control of the magistrates" and entitled him to other privileges of the university's intellectuals. Every month he was eligible to receive a half tun (126 gallons) of beer, and ten gallons of wine every three months tax-free. In addition, no troops could be quartered in his home except during military emergencies. He also became exempt from standing night watch, and making contributions to public works and fortifications.

During his time at the university, Robinson was an active participant in the Arminian controversy, siding with the Calvinists. The Arminians believed in free will, rejected predestination, and advocated the possibility of salvation for all. Calvinists, on the other hand, which was the basis of the state's Dutch Reformed Church, maintained that God is sovereign in the areas of redemption and regeneration. They believed that God saves and damns whom he will, when he will, and how he will.

Robinson was urged by Polyander and other professors of the university to defend Calvinism in public debates with Episcopius, a member of the university's faculty. He began attending the professor's lectures to become well versed in the Arminian views. The debate lasted for three days. William Bradford, who was present, wrote later that the Lord helped Robinson "to defend the truth and fail his adversary, as he put him [Episcopius] to an apparent non-plus in this great and public audience.”

Robinson was also a prolific writer. During various periods, he wrote sixty-two essays, which include his adamant A Justification of Separation from the Church of England (1610), Of Religious Communion, Private and Public (1614), edited and had published The Ecclesiastical Polity of Christ and the opposed Hierarchical Polity written by the Rev. Robert Parker (1616), Apologia Brownistarum (1619), A Defence of the Doctrine propounded by the Synod of Dort (1624), Observations Divine and Morall (1625), and his more tolerant A Treatise on the Lawfulness of Hearing Ministers in the Church of England (1624; published after his death in 1634). Several pamphlets were also written defending Separatist doctrine and withdrawal from the Church of England. His Works, with a memoir by Robert Ashton, were reprinted in three volumes in 1851.

== A minority travel to America ==
The years spent in Holland were a time of poverty and hardship for a great majority of the Separatist congregation. The culture and language were difficult for the Separatists to learn, and as the years passed it was observed that their children were becoming more Dutch than English. The congregation came to believe that they faced eventual extinction if they remained at Leiden. Moreover, a war was brewing between the Dutch and Spanish. If Spain overtook Holland, there was a possibility that the Separatists would then lose their freedom.

Finally a decision was made to emigrate again, this time to America. The decision was finally made in early 1619, when Deacon John Carver and Robert Cushman, who had business experience, were sent to London to negotiate with the London Company. They carried with them articles of belief, written by Robinson and Brewster, as evidence of their loyalty and orthodoxy.

Only a minority of the Leiden congregation would sail to America. Along with the hiring of the Mayflower at London, the Speedwell was engaged to transport the would-be Pilgrims from the port of Delfshaven in the Netherlands to London to join with the Mayflower for the journey to America. Of the minority group that emigrated, Robinson's brother-in-law, John Carver, was appointed governor and William Brewster, as ruling elder. Unfortunately, the Speedwell proved unseaworthy after arriving at England and all those capable of transferring and crowding onto the Mayflower did so. But, it is unknown how many of the Pilgrims decided not to sail on the Mayflower either returning to Leiden or remaining in England. Only thirty-five members of Robinson's congregation actually sailed on the Mayflower joined by sixty-six people from Southampton and London who had little religious motivation for joining the Pilgrims. Before Carver and his group left Leiden, a solemn service was held, at which Robinson chose Ezra 8:21 as his text:

Then I proclaimed a fast there, at the river of Ahava, that we might afflict ourselves before our God, to seek of him a right way for us, and for our little ones, and for all our substance.

At the sailing of the Speedwell from Delfshaven, part of Robinson's Farewell sermon said:

I charge you before God and his blessed angels that you follow me no further than you have seen me follow Christ. If God reveal anything to you by any other instrument of His, be as ready to receive it as you were to receive any truth from my ministry, for I am verily persuaded the Lord hath more truth and light yet to break forth from His holy word. The Lutherans cannot be drawn to go beyond what Luther saw. Whatever part of His will our God has revealed to Calvin, they (Lutherans) will rather die than embrace it; and the Calvinists, you see, stick fast where they were left by that great man of God, who yet saw not all things. This is a misery much to be lamented.

The sermon lasted ‘a good part of the day’.

The Mayflower reached the coast of what is now Massachusetts on 21 November 1620. For the next several years, the Pilgrims awaited the arrival of Robinson and the rest of the congregation.

The departure for most of the rest of the congregation was delayed for several years. Robinson became ill on 22 February 1625 but recovered enough to preach twice the next day, which was Sunday. He died on 1 March and was interred on 4 March at the Pieterskerk.

== Posthumous events ==
After Robinson died, the remnant congregation at Leiden began a period of gradual decline. In time, there were only a few members left as several had between 1629 and 1633 sporadically relocated to the Plymouth Colony. This included Robinson's son Isaac who arrived in 1631 and joined the Pilgrims at the Plymouth Colony. In 1658 Professor John Hoornbeek of the University of Leiden claimed that Bridget and her children who were still residing at Leiden eventually joined the Dutch Reformed Church.

John Robinson and Bridget White were the parents of upwards of seven children. One unnamed child was buried in infancy in Leiden at the Pieterskerk in 1621 with six having a known first name. While five of the children lived beyond early adolescence only four (John, Bridget, Isaac and Fear) have known marriages. There was no daughter named Ann born at Norwich in 1605 as this purported child was misidentified by Burgess, Dexter and Sumner in both England and in Leiden. There also was no daughter named Mary, who was baptised 11 November 1604 in St Stephen's parish in Norwich where Rev. John Robinson did not reside. She was the third of five children of a John Robinson identified as a brewer in the baptism records, with Mary's father buried in St Stephen's parish on 26 March 1612:

1. John, born in Norwich, England and baptised on 24 March 1606 [N.S.] in St Peter Hungate, Norwich; matriculated at the University of Leiden, first on 17 April 1622 as a student of Fine Arts and again on 5 April 1633 as a student of Theology; in-between the latter two dates he graduated in May 1630 from the University of Caen in Normandy, France with a degree in Medicine; was married with children and in 1658 was living in Norwich, England.
2. Bridget, born in Norwich, England and baptised there on 25 January 1607 [N.S.] in St Peter Hungate; married (1) John Greenwood in Leiden in 1629, who studied theology at the University of Leiden; 2) William Lee of Amsterdam in 1637; she was living in Leiden in 1680 and had two daughters living there in 1680.
3. Isaac, born in Leiden in 1610 and died circa 1704 likely in Barnstable, Massachusetts; arrived in Boston aboard the Lion on 15 February 1631 [N.S.]; married (1) Margaret Hanford; (2) an unnamed wife (not Mary Faunce as often claimed); (3) Mary, whose maiden name is unknown, but was living in July 1686 as Isaac's wife in Tisbury, Massachusetts. Children by all three wives. Isaac is the only child of his parents who emigrated to America.
4. Mercy, born in Leiden in circa 1614; was buried in 1623 in Leiden at the Pieterskerk.
5. Fear, born in Leiden circa 1616, died testate in Leiden before 31 May 1670; married in Leiden, John Jennings, Jr. in 1648, who died in Leiden in 1664 leaving three daughters.
6. James, whose name appears by the Latin form as Jacobus, born in Leiden circa 1620–21; at age 12 he matriculated in May 1633 at Leiden University as a student of Literature; never married and was buried on 26 May 1638 in Leiden at the Pieterskerk.

After her husband's death, the widow Bridget Robinson continued to live at Leiden. Her inclusion in 1629 as an intended passenger of the so-called Mayflower II to New England is a fabrication. On 6 April 1640 at Leiden she witnessed the marriage of George Materce to the widow Elizabeth (Jepson) Loder. On 3 July 1641 at Leiden, Bridget is named as then living, aged about 66, in the affidavit of Rose (Lisle) Jennings, widow of John Jennings, regarding Bridget's former financial support of Mary Jennings, who died at Leiden in November 1640.

On 28 October 1643, the Will of Bridget Robinson was drawn at Leiden by notary J. F. van Merwen on the Breestraat. At the time she had four living children: John, a doctor of medicine, who was married and living in England; Isaac, who was married and living in New England; Bridget, who had married William Lee as her 2nd husband; and Fear, who later married John Jennings, Jr. The date of her death and place of interment is not of known record.

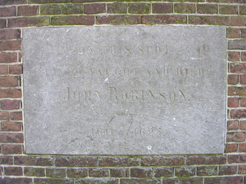
Marble marker on the former location of John Robinson's home at Leiden

In 1865, a marble marker was placed on the building occupying the former site of Robinson's home. It is inscribed:

“On this spot, lived, taught, and died John Robinson, 1611–1625.”

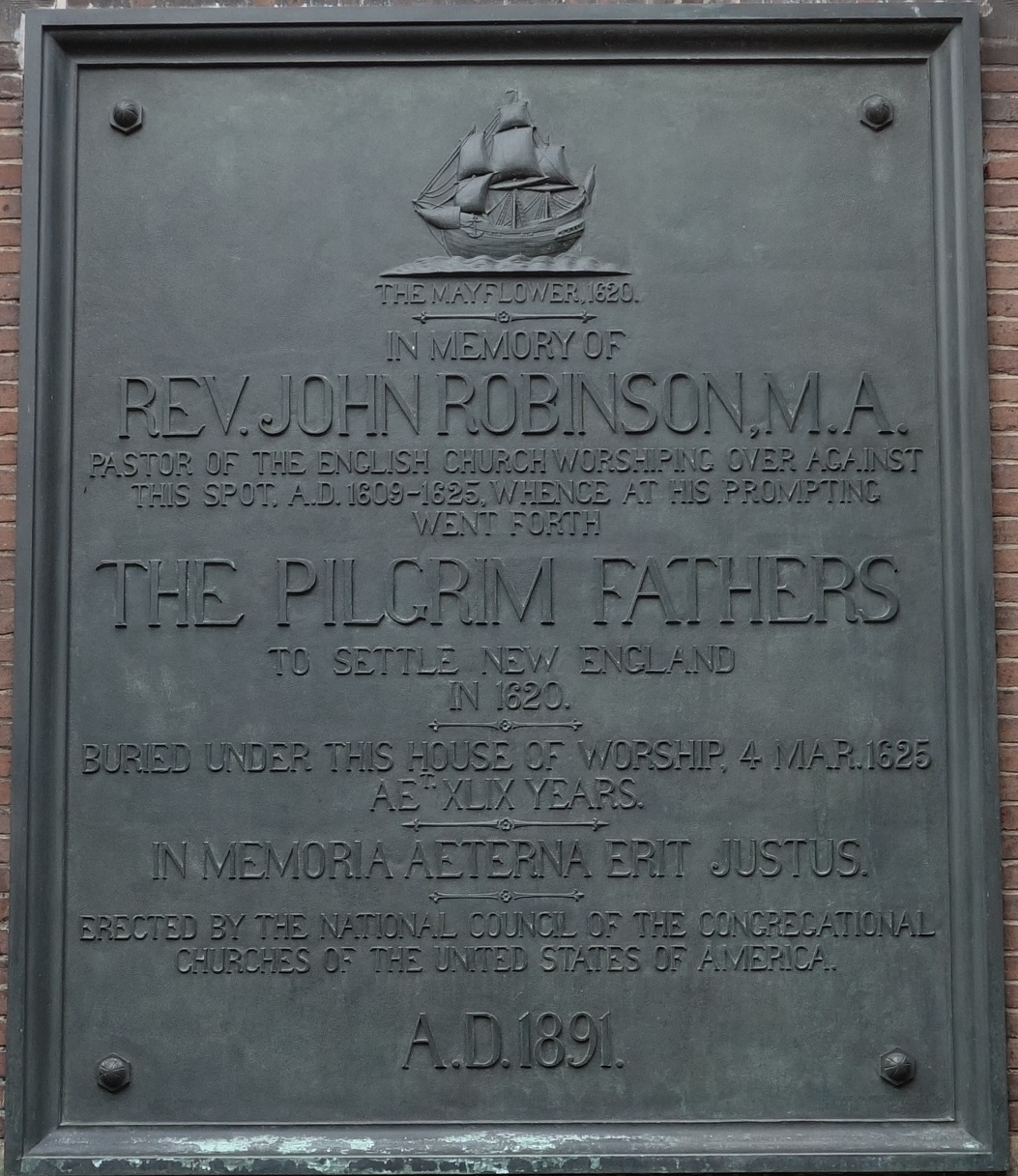
Metal marker in memory of John Robinson on the outside of the Pieterskerk at Leiden

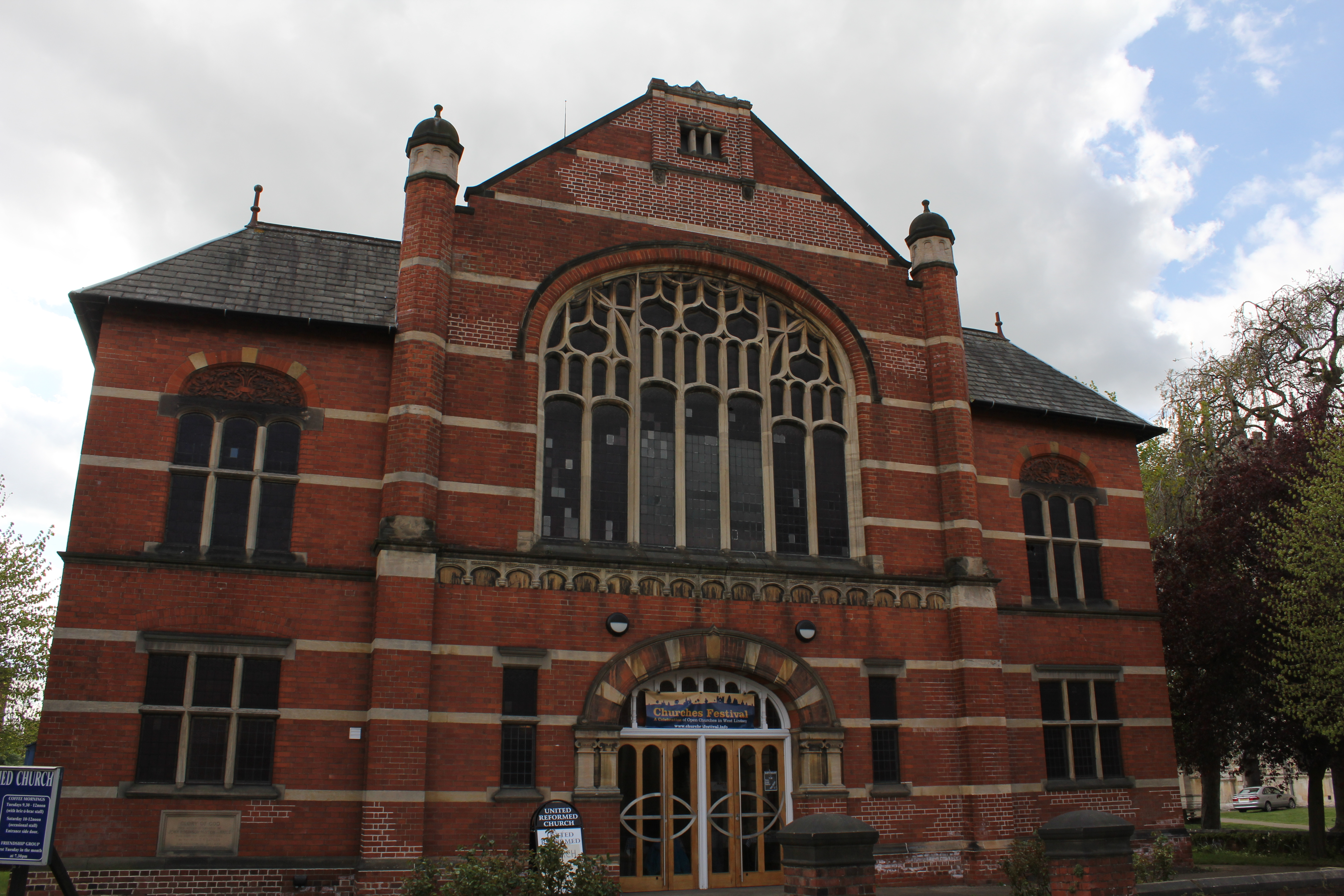
Gainsborough United Reformed Church (the John Robinson Memorial Church)

On 24 July 1891 under the auspices of the National Council of the Congregational Churches of the United States, a bronze marker in his memory was placed on the wall of the Pieterskerk. Present were delegates from the United States (including his descendant Rev. William Robinson of Vermont, who was a member of the committee responsible for the marker's erection) and England, the city and University of Leiden, and the city's clergy. On this marker was inscribed:

“In Memory of
Rev. John Robinson, M. A.
Pastor of the English Church Worshipping Over Against
This Spot, A. D. 1609 – 1625, Whence at his Prompting
Went Forth
THE PILGRIM FATHERS
To Settle New England
in 1620
- – - – - – - – -
Buried under this house of worship, 4 March 1625
Æt. XLIX Years.
In Memoria Aeterna Erit Justus.
Erected by the National Council of the Congregational
Churches of the United States of America
A. D. 1891”

The General Society of Mayflower Descendants erected a tablet on the wall of Pieterskerk in 1928. It is inscribed:

“In Memory of
JOHN ROBINSON
Pastor of the English Church in Leyden
1609 1625
His Broadly Tolerant Mind
Guided and Developed the Religious Life of
THE PILGRIMS OF THE MAYFLOWER
of Him These Walls Enshrine All That Was Mortal
His Undying Spirit
Still Dominates the Consciences of a Mighty Nation
In the Land Beyond the Seas
This tablet was erected by the General Society of Mayflower
Descendants in the United States of America A.D. 1928.”

The John Robinson Memorial Church in Gainsborough, Lincolnshire, was dedicated in 1897; the cornerstone had been laid by Thomas F. Bayard, US Ambassador.
