= London underground church =

Radical fringe group of Church of England

The London underground church was an illegal Puritan group in the time of Elizabeth I and James I. It began as a radical fringe of the Church of England, but split from the Church and later became part of the Brownist or puritan Separatist movement. William Bradford, Governor of Plymouth Plantation, cited the underground church as the first that 'professed and practised the cause' of the Pilgrim Fathers.

== Marian underground ==
The underground Protestant church in London in Queen Mary's time was a forerunner of the Elizabethan underground church. It formed in response to the Queen's decision to make the Catholic Church in England and Wales to once again be the state religion and to her simultaneous religious persecution of Protestants. It began with 20 people and grew to 200. They met in inns and private houses.

Underground ministers in London included Thomas Rose, the martyr John Rough, Augustine Bernher, and Thomas Bentham who under Elizabeth became Bishop of Coventry and Lichfield. As well as Rough, members who were executed included the deacon Cutbert Symson and Margaret Mearing.

== Elizabethan underground ==
The underground church dissolved when Elizabeth I of England came to the throne in 1558, outlawed the Catholic Church in England and Wales and in Ireland, and re-established the Church of England as the state religion. The new Queen's preference for Anglo-Catholicism, however, and her orders that all Anglican clergy were to wear traditional vestments, gave rise to Puritanism, a movement to "purify" the Anglican Communion of all Pre-Reformation traditions. In 1566, 37 London clergy were suspended for non-conformity and 14 eventually dismissed. The most radical started to lead illegal services, reviving the underground. One member, John Smith, later explained: "When it came to this point, that all our preachers were displaced by your law… Then we bethought us what were best to do; and we remembered that there was a congregation of us in this city in Queen Mary's days."

On 16 June 1567, a hundred people were discovered worshipping in Plumbers' Hall, Anchor Lane, and 17 arrested. Some were interrogated by the Anglican Bishop of London, Edmund Grindal, and wrote a transcript of the interviews. Other arrests occurred off Pudding Lane, in the house of James Tynne, a goldsmith, and in the dwelling of Bishop Grindal's own servant. Grindal said that they also met 'sometimes in the fields, and occasionally even in ships'.

Leaders of the movement included Richard Fitz, John Browne, Mr Pattenson (who also wrote up an interview with Grindal), William Bonham and Nicholas Crane (all ministers) and the layman William White.

The historian of Separatism Stephen Tomkins argues that the underground church started out as a single citywide network before splitting into factions, and that they only gradually came to see themselves as Separatists from the Church of England. He suggests the church had a thousand members at its height, which would be one percent of the population of London.

In 1568, leading members of the movement, with the agreement of William Cecil, went to Scotland, apparently with a view to taking their church into exile there, but decided against it. They were disappointed to be told by John Knox that he could not support their separation from the Church of England.

William White wrote a tract justifying the illegal meetings of the underground church, A brief of such things as obscure Gods glory (undated).

By the end of the 1560s, the movement had split into rival factions, one led by Fitz. This and the experience of persecution reduced the movement from perhaps a thousand Londoners to a small remnant, and yet the 'Fitz church' survived into the 1580s.

== Under Henry Barrow ==
The puritans Henry Barrow and John Greenwood were converted to Separatism – now known as Brownism after the Norfolk Separatist Robert Browne – around 1586. The pair joined and revived the London Underground Church.

The church met in fields in summer and houses in winter, from 5am, sometimes worshipping all day. They rejected written liturgy as 'babbling in the Lord's sight' and allowed any member to preach. According to a visitor, 'In their prayer, one speaketh and the rest do groan or sob or sigh, as if they would wring out tears.'

The underground church, as taught by Barrow and Greenwood, believed that churches had to be voluntary communities of committed believers, and that the Church of England, which coerced the whole population into joining, was therefore not a true Church. They published their ideas in numerous books, printed through an illegal smuggling operation, in the Netherlands.

A service in the house of one Henry Martin was raided on 8 October 1587 in the west London parish of St Andrew-by-the Wardrobe. 21 people were arrested, including Greenwood. Barrow visited him in the Clink prison on 19 November and was not allowed to leave. The pair were indicted under the Recusancy Act 1581 at the 1588 Newgate Sessions, fined £260, then moved to the Fleet prison.

The Archbishop's men now went beyond catching the congregation while meeting, and started raiding individual's home. Roger Jackson and Thomas Legate were taken from their beds and arrested for having writings by Barrow, without warrant. William Clarke, was jailed for complaining about the procedure. Quintin Smythe's feltmaking workshop was raided, revealing Brownist writings and a Bible, so he was kept in irons in Newgate. John Purdye was arrested and tortured in Bridewell. Seven died within 19 months.

On 13 March 1589, church members presented a petition directly the Queen, for which three were arrested. The petition complained that they faced 'daily spoiling, vexing, molesting, hurting, pursuing, imprisoning, yea, barring and locking them up close prisoners in the most unwholesome and vile prisons'. They said they were held without trial and appealed for an audience with the Privy Council. On 18 March, Barrow was interviewed by the council, where he called the Archbishop of Canterbury, John Whitgift, to his face, 'a monster, a miserable compound'. Other prisoners were interviewed before an episcopal court.

By February 1590, 52 members of the underground church were being held in six London prisons. Ten had died in jail.

The Bishop of London put together a team of 42 ministers and academics to visit the Brownists twice a week and engage in theological debate in order to win them back to the church – or failing that to get evidence to be used against them in court. The conversations with Barrow and Greenwood went so well for the Separatists that they published their transcripts, illegally, and the bishop abandoned the scheme.

In the winter of 1590–1, the church printed 2,000 copies of Barrow's magnum opus in Dort. On its way back though, the cargo was seized by the British governor at Flushing and Arthur Bellot, who was carrying it, was arrested. The minister of the English church in Middelburg, Francis Johnson, was tasked with burning the books, but kept one copy for himself. He was converted by it, joined the London church, and later became its minister.

When a number of members were released in July 1592, including Greenwood, the church elected him as teacher and Johnson as pastor. They also chose deacons and elders. Greenwood and Johnson were arrested in December, along with their elder Daniel Studley.

In February, Roger Rippon died in Newgate jail. Member of the church carried his coffin to the door of Justice Richard Young, an officer in the episcopal Court of High Commission, leaving it with an inscription saying 'his blood crieth for speedy vengeance'. 56 people were arrested as a result, though only one admitted to taking part in the procession.

The church gained a high-profile convert when John Penry joined the church in October 1592. Penry, described by Stephen Tomkins as 'the most wanted puritan in England', was one of the leading figures behind the notorious Martin Marprelate tracts. He petitioned Parliament in protest against their treatment, and the three women who delivered the document were arrested.

Five Brownists, including Barrow and Greenwood were tried at the Old Bailey in March 1593 and sentenced to death under the Seditious Words and Rumours Act 1581. The two leaders were hanged on 6 April and the other three released.

== Under Francis Johnson ==
The Seditious Sectaries Act 1592 outlawed the Brownist church, banishing its members from England on pain of death. A large part of the London congregation emigrated to Amsterdam, including some who were released from prison for the purpose. Others remained surreptitiously in London. Both groups were now led by Francis Johnson, though he was kept in the Clink prison.

In 1597, Johnson and three others were released to go and scout out a Brownist colony in Newfoundland, with the blessing of the government. The expedition failed, and the four joined the Amsterdam church. This congregation thrived, growing to a few hundred, and produced a stream of propaganda against the Church of England that was smuggled back into the homeland.

The remaining Londoners, under the deacon Nicholas Lee, tried to appoint their own minister, but were overruled by Francis Johnson, according to his brother George, fearing there would then be less incentive for people to come to Amsterdam. Other Separatist groups appeared in the city, and one contemporary mentioned 'the manifold curses which the Brownists remaining in London have oft laid upon one another'.

By 1631, there were, according to the Bishop of Exeter, 'eleven several congregations (as they call them) of separatists about the city'. Ten years later, the Bishop of Norwich counted eighty in the London area, led by 'cobblers, tailors, felt-makers and suchlike trash'.
