= Oliver Pigg =

English Puritan clergyman

Oliver Pigg (also Pig, Pygg and Pygge) (fl. 1580) was an English Puritan clergyman.

== Life ==
Born about 1551, Pigg was from Essex. He was admitted pensioner of St. John's College, Cambridge, on 6 Oct. 1565, and scholar on 8 Nov. 1566. He graduated B.A. in 1568–9.

Pigg was rector of All Saints', Colchester, 1569–71 of St. Peter's, Colchester, 1569–79, and Abberton in Essex, 1571–8. In 1578 he was also beneficed in the diocese of Norwich, and in February 1583 was temporarily appointed to the cure of Rougham, Suffolk.

In July 1583 Pigg was imprisoned at Bury St. Edmunds. The charge was of "dispraising" the Book of Common Prayer, especially by putting the question in the baptismal service, "Dost thou believe?" to the parents, in place of the child. In a petition for release to the justices of Bury he declared his "detestation of the proceedings of Browne, Harrison, and their favourers". Before the next assizes he conformed; and after some further minor troubles was discharged.

In 1587, at a meeting held at Cambridge, under the presidency of Thomas Cartwright to promote church discipline, Pigg and William Dyke were nominated superintendents of the Puritan ministers for Hertfordshire. In 1589 he preached in Dorchester, Dorset, and in 1591 was in London.

== Works ==
Pigg wrote:

- A sermon on the 101st psalm
- A comfortable Treatise upon the latter part of the fourth chapter of the first Epistle of St. Peter, from the twelfth verse to the ende, London, 1582
- Meditations concerning Prayer to Almighty God for the Safety of England when the Spaniards were come into the Narrow Seas, 1588. As also other Meditations for delivering England from the Cruelty of the Spaniards, London, 1588

== Notes ==
Attribution

This article incorporates text from a publication now in the public domain: Lee, Sidney, ed. (1896). "Pigg, Oliver". Dictionary of National Biography. Vol. 45. London: Smith, Elder & Co.
