= Francis Johnson (Brownist) =

English separatist and pastor (1562–1618)

Francis Johnson (March 1562 – January 1618) was an English separatist, or Brownist, minister, pastor to an English exile congregation in the Netherlands.

== Early life ==
Francis was the elder son of John Johnson, mayor of Richmond, North Riding of Yorkshire, born at Richmond and baptised there on 27 March 1562. George Johnson was his brother. He matriculated at Christ's College, Cambridge, graduated B.A. 1581, M.A. 1585, and was elected fellow before Lady day 1584.

He was a popular preacher in the university, and a follower of the independent presbyterianism advocated by Thomas Cartwright. On 6 January 1589 he expounded this view in a sermon at Great St. Mary's, Cambridge, claiming that church government by elders is jure divino. With Cuthbert Bainbrigg, also a fellow of Christ's, accused of factious preaching, he on 23 January came up before Thomas Nevile, the vice-chancellor.

Refusing to answer on oath to the articles of accusation, Johnson and Bainbrigg were committed to prison. Johnson gave in written answers which set out his views, but again on 13 March and 18 April declined the oath. Bail was offered by Sir Henry Knevett and Sir William Bowes, but was rejected by the authorities. On 22 May, Johnson and Bainbrigg addressed a letter to Lord Burghley, the chancellor; but the vice-chancellor laid the case before the court of high commission, which directed the vice-chancellor and heads to proceed at discretion. A form of recantation was given to Johnson on 19 October and he was required to read it in the pulpit of Great St. Mary's. He made an unconvincing retractation and on 30 October he was expelled from the university. He claimed a right of appeal, and refusing to leave; he was in December again in custody and vainly petitioning Burghley, backed by fellows of colleges.

== First period in the Netherlands ==
Johnson went to Middelburg in Zealand, where he became preacher to the English Merchant Adventurers in the Gasthuis Kerk, with a stipend of £200. In 1591, Johnson discovered that the Brownist Arthur Bellot was smuggling 2,000 copies of A Plaine Refutation by Henry Barrow and John Greenwood through Flushing into England. It was an answer to George Gifford, and had been sent to Middelburg to be printed. On the advice of Lord Burghley, Johnson seized the books and burned them – but kept a copy out of curiosity, and was converted by it to Brownism.

== Return to London ==
In 1592 Johnson was sacked by the Merchant Adventurers after he tried to introduce a Brownist-style covenant to their church. He came to London to confer with Barrow and Greenwood, who were then in the Fleet Prison, and joined their Brownist church. Greenwood was shortly afterwards transferred to the house of Roger Rippon. At a meeting in the house of Fox, in Nicholas Lane, Johnson was chosen pastor.

Discipline was practised, and the sacraments administered. This conventicle being discovered, Johnson was committed for a time to the Wood Street Counter. To avoid detection the place of assembly was constantly changed. Johnson was arrested in October 1592, and again on 5 December, this time with Greenwood in the house of Edward Boyes, a haberdasher on Ludgate Hill. Johnson was imprisoned and was twice examined.

After Barrow, Greenwood and John Penry were executed in 1593, under the Seditious Words and Rumours Act of 1581, much of the congregation went into exile in the Netherlands. Johnson was detained in the Clink prison, Southwark, from where he continued to pastor his exiled congregation. While in prison he married in 1594 Thomasine, widow of Boyes, who brought him £300, which led to a protracted dispute with George who violently disapproved of Thomasine's way of dressing. Attempts made by puritan churchmen through Henry Jacob failed to win him back to the national church. In 1596 he wrote the foundational Brownist document A Trve Confession of the Faith ... vvhich vve hir Majesties Subjects, falsely called Brovvnists, doo hould tovvards God.

== First expedition to North America ==
In 1597, Johnson persuaded the Privy Council to release him and three other Brownists to found a Puritan Separatist colony in the Magdalen Islands off the coast of Newfoundland. Francis, his brother George, his elder Daniel Studley, and a fourth member of the church John Clarke, were passengers of the merchants Abraham and Stephen Van Hardwick, and Captain Charles Leigh of Addington. Johnson left Gravesend in the Hopewell on 8 April, with Studley, the other two sailing in the Chancewell. The Chancewell was wrecked off Cape Breton, and many of their possessions were lost. The colonial expedition was abandoned for reasons that are not entirely clear, but the historian of separatism Stephen Tomkins suggests 'the expedition failed because of a combination of the hostility and prior occupation of the territory, the loss of their belongings and the non-cooperation of the crew'. Leigh brought them back to England where Francis rejoined Thomasine and the group made their way to Amsterdam.

== Second period in the Netherlands ==
Johnson resumed his pastorate among the exiled separatists, with Henry Ainsworth as doctor (teacher). In 1598 he was concerned in a Latin version (for transmission to continental and Scottish universities) of the Trve Confession. Dissensions arose in the community, George resuming his attacks on Thomasine's taste in dress. Ainsworth tried to prevent a breach, and the Johnson's father John came from London to reconcile his sons, but in the winter of 1598–9, Francis excommunicated both his brother and father.

Another scandal hit the church when Studley was accused of having sex with his stepdaughter. Johnson supported his elder, and considered the allegation unproved.

On the accession of James I, Johnson and Ainsworth visited London to deliver a petition for toleration, which was unsuccessful but which they published as An Apologie or Defence of svch trve Christians as are commonly (vnjustly) called Brovvnists.

In 1607 or 1608, the Gainsborough Congregation, led by John Smyth, the Puritan leader, was exiled to Amsterdam. Smyth some years later developed individual Mennonite views, and was excommunicated by Thomas Helwys. Johnson's Amsterdam church at this point had its own meeting-house and three hundred communicants.

More serious differences arose in 1609 out of the differing views of Johnson and Ainsworth as to the function of the eldership. Johnson made the eldership the seat of authority; Ainsworth vested all authority in the congregation itself, of which the elders were an executive. After much discussion Johnson proposed that the 'congregationalists' should move to Leyden, joining the exile church there (a group that included at some points Robert Parker, Henry Jacob, William Ames and John Robinson). But the compromise fell through, and Ainsworth with his congregation obtained a place for worship two doors away from the meeting-house, and moved there in December 1610. The 'Ainsworthian Brownists' as they were popularly termed, were excommunicated by the 'Franciscan Brownists.' Ainsworth began a lawsuit for the recovery of the meeting-house.

Johnson and his presbyterians moved on to Emden in East Friesland, at some stage; how long the Emden settlement lasted is unknown. Johnson died at Amsterdam, and was buried there on 10 January 1618.

== Works ==
He wrote generally for sale in London. He published:

- Confessio Fidei Anglorum Quorundam in Belgio, &c., 1598 (anon.); 1607, with additions by Ainsworth.
- Answer to Maister H. Jacob his Defence of the Churches and Ministry of England, &c., 1600; appended is An Answer to ... his Treatise concerning the Priestes of the Church of England, &c., 1600.
- An Apologie or Defence of svch Trve Christians as are . . . called Brovvnists, &c., 1604 (translated into Dutch, 1612).
- An Inquirie and Answer of Thomas White, his Discouery of Brownism, &c., 1605.
- Certavne Reasons . . . prouing that it is not lawfull to . . . haue any Spiritual communion with the present Ministerie of the Church of England, &c., 1608 (answered by William Bradshaw, in The Vnreasonablenesse of the Separation, &c., Dort, 1614).
- A Brief Treatise containing . . . reasons against Two Errors of the Anabaptists, &c., [1610], reprinted 1645.
- A Short Treatise concerning the Exposition of . . "Tell the Church," &c.. 1611.
- A Christian Plea, conteyning three Treatises . . . touching the Anabaptists . . . Remonstrants. . .the Reformed Churches, &c., 1617.

He contributed a running commentary to A Treatise on the Ministry (1595) by Arthur Hildersam.
