= Church covenant =

Declaration of duties of church members

A church covenant is a declaration, which some churches draw up and call their members to sign, in which their duties as church members towards God and their fellow believers are outlined. It is a fraternal agreement, freely endorsed, that establishes what are, according to the Holy Scriptures, the duties of a Christian and the responsibilities which each church member pledges themselves to honour.

== History ==
The idea of a church covenant is an expression of the free-church ecclesiology and it issues from within the context of the English Puritanism, becoming afterwards one of the characteristic traits of the Baptist churches.

In the 16th century, the Church in England, confronted with the teaching of the Bible under the impulse of continental Protestantism, engaged itself in a reformation which disconnected it from many persuasions, practices and traditions of Roman Catholicism. In particular, from the time of Henry VIII's divorce from Catherine of Aragon and subsequent marriage to Queen Anne Boleyn, it reflected on the meaning, structure and function of being a church and was involved in heated discussions on the measure according to which this reformation must occur.

To the end of the reign of Edward VI the model of the Reformed Genevan ecclesiology prevailed. After the parenthesis of Mary I, in which Roman Catholicism was restored, with Elizabeth I a line of compromise prevailed and lasted until the time of Charles I when, caused by the English Civil War, Calvinist Presbyterianism was reintroduced. With Charles II, the Elizabethan settlement was reconfirmed and again imposed a compromise line between Catholicism and Protestantism.

A new ecclesiology thus matured in this context. It was different from the traditional one, the one used to the concept of territorial churches subdivided in parishes, "people's church", governed by clerical hierarchies (episcopacy). It was "the free-church ecclesiology", in which the church is mainly a free and voluntary local association of committed Christians, democratically self-managed, distinct and independent from the State. They are Christians bound one to the others on the basis of a covenant and affirming a Confession of faith. In the case of the Baptist movement, believers' baptism is understood as the seal of such a commitment towards God and one to the other. This movement, consequently, gets closer and closer to the doctrines and experiences first of the Anabaptists, then of Mennonites.

The concept of the church as God's people bound by a covenant, although not new in the history of Christianity, was developed extensively by the Strasbourg reformer Martin Bucer (1491–1551) and taken up in Puritanism by Richard Fitz (1570), who established in London by 1567 a Christian congregation separated from the officially sanctioned Anglican church. He expressed the aspiration to establish a church free from the State interference, characterised by what are understood by the signs of a true church: biblical preaching, New Testament sacraments, and ordered by a serious discipline. This church must be formed, Fitz wrote, on the basis of a voluntary covenant:

Being thoroughly persuaded in the conscience by the working and by the word of the almighty, that these relics of Antichrist be abominable before the Lord our God. And also for that by the power and mercy, strength and goodness of the lord my God only, I am escaped from the filthiness and pollution of these detestable traditions, through the knowledge of our Lord and Saviour Jesus Christ. And last of all, inasmuch as by the workings also of the lord Jesus his holy spirit, I have joined in prayer and in hearing God's word with those that have not yielded to this idolatrous trash, notwithstanding the danger of not coming to my parish church etc. Therefore I come not back again to the preachings etc. of them that have received these marks of the Romish beast.

Robert Browne (1540–1630) theorized how God's faithful people are called to separate themselves from the unfaithful ones, and that the only way to form a true church is, for believers, to agree together in a covenant, the signing of which is expected by all those who wish to be part of it. This way God's people would submit to the authority of Christ, becoming a real church. Signing this contract would become the sign of the genuine Christian Henry Barrowe (1550–1593) took up and further elaborated on Browne's ideas, linking the local church covenant to the eternal covenant of God, emphasizing the consistent application of church discipline for those who infringe this covenant. In the Separatist Confession of Faith of 1596, article 33, the church is thus described:

That beeing come forth of this antichristian estate vnto the freedom and true profession of Christ, besides the instructing and vvell guyding of their ovvn Families, they areu vvillingly to ioyne together in christian communion and orderly couenant, and by confession of Faith and obedience of Christ, to vnite themselues into peculiar Congregatios; vvherin, as members of one body vvherof Christ is the only head, they are to vvorship and serue God according to his vvord, remembring to keep holy the Lords day.

Records being rather scarce, we do not know how much the separatist ideas in fact do influence John Smyth's thought. Through great part of his career, Smyth believes that a local church covenant is the most appropriate answer to God's offer of the covenant of grace. He writes "to be debtor, in these ideas, to the separatist "ancient brothers". Smyth declares that the true church members are "the saints only" and that these must convene in a local church through a fraternal covenant. From this perspective, Smyth has much in common with the Anabaptist persuasion that the best way to relate to God is through a community of believers. Later, as Smyth gets closer to the Mennonites, he does not any more emphasize this concept.

The idea of church covenant becomes prominent among the puritans that settle in America. In 1648, in Cambridge (Massachusetts) John Cotton, Richard Mather, e Ralph Partridge draw out "a model for the government of the church" in which the reasoning thus follows: "this visible union cannot be established by mere 'faith,' for that is invisible; nor by a 'bare profession' of faith, for that does not make a person part of one particular church or another; nor by 'cohabitation' (i.e., living in the same community), for "atheists and Infidels may dwell together with believers"; nor by "baptism," since baptism by itself does not make a person a part of a particular church. What establishes the visible union of a group of believers into a church is that they make a covenant with each other to be the church".

The church covenant was to congregationalism what apostolic succession was to episcopal churches: their grounds for being and license to practice the sacraments. The covenant idea is necessary for the free church since the only force holding a member to a church is his or her commitment, i.e. covenant. Original Congregationalists and Baptists concluded that church covenants were an essential ingredient of church membership and foundational for church discipline. Covenants were definitional to the local church, signed by members, and expected to be honored until the forces of consumerism and individualism, exemplified by Wade Burleson’s (2016) argument that they were abusive, hit the churches. In the generation since Charles Deweese’s book (1990), church covenants have continued waning. Even traditionalist organizations, like 9Marks, rarely mention the role of the church covenant in the church’s life.

== See also ==
- List of Christian creeds
