= Definitions of Puritanism =

Puritianism Definitions

Historians have produced and worked with a number of definitions of Puritanism, in an unresolved debate on the nature of the Puritan movement of the 16th and 17th century. There are some historians who are prepared to reject the term for historical use. John Spurr argues that changes in the terms of membership of the Church of England, in 1604–6, 1626, 1662, and also 1689, led to re-definitions of the word "Puritan". Basil Hall, citing Richard Baxter considers that "Puritan" dropped out of contemporary usage in 1642, with the outbreak of the First English Civil War, being replaced by more accurate religious terminology. Current literature on Puritanism supports two general points: Puritans were identifiable in terms of their general culture, by contemporaries, which changed over time; and they were not identified by theological views alone.

== To the 1620s ==
Historians now generally reject the idea that before the 1620s and the influence of Arminianism in the Church of England there were significant differences in doctrine between English Puritans in general, and other English Protestants. Puritans were in practice known as "zealous Calvinists" fond of preaching. For this reason a term sometimes preferred is "Hot Protestantism": i.e. one approach to Puritanism is to regard it simply as Protestant belief, intensely held.

=== Separatist groups ===
Numerous, generally small, Calvinist dissenting groups and sects are classified as broad-sense Puritans. These separating Puritans fit more comfortably into the history of denominations than do the bulk of Puritans who remained within the Church of England (non-separating Puritans).

=== Scripture alone ===
William Ames provided a self-definition of Puritans via three points, in 1610. Point 3 is sola scriptura.

It has been argued that Puritans adopted the Calvinist regulative principle of worship. The laxer normative principle of worship was characteristic of the Church of England. The Puritans took the side of Calvin and the Zwinglians, against Philip Melanchthon, in this early contentious debate of the Protestant Reformation.

=== Elizabethan Puritanism ===
Patrick Collinson states that "puritan" and "papist" were not "taxonomic definitions" in the Elizabethan period.

=== Jacobean Puritanism and conforming Puritans ===
The approach taken by King James I led to the absorption of many conforming Puritans into the Church of England of the time. Collinson has discussed a moderate Puritanism, as contrasted to an extreme Puritanism that demanded presbyterianism in church polity. Ferrell argues that conforming Puritanism was at the same time part of a theological consensus, and in terms of church polity a target of the sustained and divisive Jacobean polemical campaign against further reform. These definitions contrast with others, less precise in period, that on the one hand identified Puritans closely with presbyterians, as in Perry Miller, or with the whole gamut of presbyterian and Independent believers.

Francis Bacon criticised Puritans for their over-strict judgements on adiaphora. On the other hand, Hill gives examples of conforming Puritans who did not object to set forms of worship. Towards the end of King James's reign Marco Antonio de Dominis analysed the views of the Church of England and Roman Catholic Church, concluding that, excepting the views of the Puritans, they were at root compatible. He did make a further qualification, about the extreme Calvinism of some of the bishops.

==== Semi-separatism ====
The enforcement of a degree of religious uniformity also led to the formation of "semi-separated" clergy. This kind of semi-separatism relied on niches where Puritan clergy could find employment. These niches, however, are not easily classified.

=== Lay Puritanism ===
Lay patrons of Puritanism were prominent in the middle years of the reign of Elizabeth I. Godly gentlemen, the so-called Puritan gentry, then became a significant factor in English life and politics. Henry Hastings, 3rd Earl of Huntingdon was a renowned member of the godly nobility.

== From the 1620s ==
After about 1620 there arose clear theological points at issue between English Puritans and other English Protestants. The future colonist Emmanuel Downing wrote to James Ussher in 1620 asking that the king should provide a definition. There were also taxonomies of Puritanism offered. Joseph Mede in 1623 divided Puritans into: (a) ecclesiastical Puritans (the originals); (b) moral Puritans; and (c) political Puritans. Henry Parker in his Discourse Concerning Puritans (1641) distinguished also the religious dogmatic Puritan.

=== Doctrinal Puritanism ===
The native English strand of Arminianism defined Calvinism as "doctrinal Puritanism". This view gained some support from King James I of England. Thomas Fuller reported that De Dominis used "Puritan" to mean "anti-Arminian". William Laud took up the topic of doctrinal Puritanism in 1624. Hill's book Society and Puritanism is directed towards the concerns of doctrinal Puritans, and their lay appeal.

=== Puritan casuistry and Puritan legacy ===
Hall proposes Puritan casuistry as a "common denominator" of types of Puritan that is of value to historians, and also was inherited by later nonconformists. More specifically, he points to "cases of conscience", and sermons preached on them. The Cripplegate Lectures were one vehicle by which this tradition was passed on. Hall gives also the example of The Practice of Piety, by Lewis Bayly, as representative, and influential on Pietism.

== New England Puritanism ==
The cultural form of Puritanism that was a major influence in the development of New England is admitted by historians to be problematic in its definition. At the time of emigration around 1630 it was no different from English Puritanism in general; by 1650 religious differentiation in New England was quite marked, and the New England branch of Puritanism had also evolved in its distinctive way. In denominational terms New England Puritanism has been identified with early congregationalism. The "New England mind", however, about which Perry Miller wrote in connection with "Puritan culture", has been subject to extensive revisionism, as has earlier work in this field.
