= Brownists =

Group of English Dissenters or early Separatists from the Church of England

The Brownists were a Christian group in 16th-century England. They were a group of English Dissenters or early Separatists from the Church of England. They were named after Robert Browne, who was born at Tolethorpe Hall in Rutland, England, in the 1550s. The terms Brownists or Separatists were used to describe them by outsiders; they were known as Saints among themselves.

A majority of the Separatists aboard the Mayflower in 1620 were Brownists, and the Pilgrims were known into the 20th century as the Brownist Emigration.

The Brownists were eventually absorbed into the Mennonite Church, while others joined the Baptist Church.

== Origins ==
There had been early advocates of a congregational form of organisation for the Church of England in the time of Henry VIII. It became clear that the English government had other plans on the re-establishment of the Anglican Church, after the Catholic Mary's reign, and these dissenters looked towards setting up a separate church.

The first wave of separatism from the Elizabethan Church of England came in London after March 1566, when Archbishop Parker enforced strict adherence to the Prayer Book and 14 ministers were deposed from office. Some of the most radical led their followers in forming the London Underground Church, meeting in secret locations. From possibly a thousand members at its height, this movement shrank, through imprisonment and deaths, to a small group of members in Browne's days. He and Robert Harrison knew of the London church, but seem to have believed it had died.

== Browne's leadership ==
Robert Browne (d. 1633) was a student who became an Anglican priest late in life. At Cambridge University, he was influenced by Puritan theologians, including Thomas Cartwright (1535–1603).

Browne became a Lecturer at St Mary's Church, Islington where his dissident preaching against the doctrines and disciplines of the Church of England began to attract attention. During 1578, Browne returned to Cambridge University and came under the influence of Richard Greenham, puritan rector of Dry Drayton. He encouraged Browne to complete his ordination and serve at a Church of England parish church. Browne was offered a lecturer position at St Bene't's Church in Cambridge, possibly through Greenham, but his tenure there was short. Browne came to reject the puritan view of reform from within the Church, and started to look outside the established Church.

In 1581, Browne had become the leader of this movement and, in Norwich, attempted to set up a separate Congregational church outside the Church of England. He was arrested but released on the advice of William Cecil, his kinsman. Browne and his companions left England and moved to Middelburg in the Netherlands later in 1581. There they organised a church on what they conceived to be the New Testament model, but the community broke up within two years owing to internal dissensions.

His most important works were published at Middelburg in 1582: A Treatise of Reformation without Tarying for Anie, in which he asserted the right of the church to effect necessary reforms without the authorisation of the civil magistrate; and A Booke which sheweth the life and manners of all True Christians, which set out the theory of Congregational independence. Two men were hanged at Bury St Edmunds in 1583 for circulating them.

Browne was an active Separatist only from 1579 to 1585. He returned to England and to the Church of England, being employed as a schoolmaster and, after 1591, a Church of England parish priest. He was much engaged in controversy with some of those who held his earlier separatist position and who now looked upon him as a renegade. In particular, he replied to John Greenwood and Henry Barrowe several times.

He is buried in St Giles's churchyard, Northampton.

== After Browne ==
The Brownist movement revived in London from around 1587, led by Henry Barrow and John Greenwood. Both were arrested in 1587 and kept in prison until their execution in 1593. They wrote numerous books of Brownist theology and polemic in secret during their imprisonment, which were smuggled out by their followers and printed in the Netherlands, the most important being Barrow's A Brief Discoverie of the False Church. Dozens of other Brownists were imprisoned and many of them died in jail.

After the execution of Barrow and Greenwood, the Brownist church was led by Francis Johnson. As a puritan minister, Johnson had been given the job of burning Brownist books, but kept one back for himself and was converted by it. To escape the fate of Barrow and Greenwood, the Brownists made an abortive attempt to settle in Newfoundland, before going into exile in Amsterdam. There the church was co-led by Henry Ainsworth and became known as the Ancient Church. Johnson and Ainsworth printed numerous works in Amsterdam which were smuggled into England.

Another wave of Brownism resulted from Archbishop Richard Bancroft's campaign against Puritanism from 1604. John Robinson and John Smyth dissented and founded Brownist churches in the north of England, one in Scrooby and the other in Gainsborough, and then led them to Amsterdam around 1608. This was the high point of the movement, with three sizable Brownist churches, on good terms with each other, in one city. The church under Smyth, however, rejected paedobaptism and adopted credobaptism, becoming the pioneer for the Baptist tradition, while Robinson responded by removing his church to Leyden, this way Smyth's church becoming the second English Brownist church in Amsterdam, while Johnson and Ainsworth quarrelled with each other and formed congregations.

Johnson took his faction to Virginia, but few survived the journey. Smyth and others were excommunicated by Thomas Helwys, his co-leader, and led his faction to join the local Mennonites, while the second church in Amsterdam, led by Helwys and John Murton, returned to London to advocate for reform and the new Baptist tenets. Half of Robinson's church sailed on the Mayflower to New England.

== Shakespeare ==
The Brownists are mentioned in Shakespeare's Twelfth Night, believed to have been written around 1600–02, in which Sir Andrew Aguecheek says, "I had as lief be a Brownist as a politician" (III, ii). The Browne family seat of Tolethorpe Hall is now home to the Stamford Shakespeare Company.

== See also ==
- History of the Puritans under Elizabeth I
- Pilgrim (Plymouth Colony)
- Religion Act 1592
