= Puritan casuistry =

Puritan casuistry is a genre of British religious literature, in the general area of moral theology, and recognised as founded about 1600. The work A Case of Conscience (1592) of William Perkins is considered foundational for the genre. So-called "case divinity" has been described as fundamental to Puritan culture. The underlying theological trend is said to be visible in George Gifford: evidence from life accentuated as "proof of election", to be obtained reflectively, and matching "biblically promised effects".

In line with the tenets of Reformed theology, the assurance of salvation could produce dilemmas on a spiritual level, and Puritan casuistry in part was a response to the need to address these issues as practical problems. Perkins, Richard Greenham, William Ames and Joseph Alleine were noted as authors who wrote in this area. From Ames, it was considered that reprobation can almost never know itself. More accurately, the issue is election, and the assurance of it, and Perkins addressed it as a preoccupation.

Otherwise, the content of "Puritan casuistry" is still somewhat contested by scholars, because the element of casuistry is apparently lower than would be expected, if it were simply the casuistry of Puritanism. One explanation lies in a transformed, Protestant, meaning of "casuistry", as the "sifting of the conscience". Some of the content of confession is therefore implied, and so of devotional life. In terms of genre, devotional literature can be closer to the mark, than moral literature. It has been argued by a Jesuit author that "casuistry" here is a misnomer, and "practical divinity" more accurate.

== Background in Early Modern casuistry ==
The medieval tradition in casuistry went under the name casus conscientiae, "cases of conscience". It took the form of moral principles shown as applied to particular situations. It was taken up by 17th century writers, both Catholic and Protestant. When Reformed theologians adopted casuistry, it was in a distinctive style: concise and biblical, and largely denying the separation of moral philosophy from theology. In the early 17th century the term "practical theology" was coming in, to cover "cases of conscience", though its scope could be wider than that.
