= Robert Harrison (Brownist) =

English lay schoolmaster and religious leader

Robert Harrison (died 1585?) was an English lay schoolmaster who became a religious leader as a Protestant Separatist, one of the original Brownists.

== Life ==
Harrison matriculated as a pensioner of St John's College, Cambridge on 4 October 1564, moved to Corpus Christi College, and graduated B.A. 1567, M.A. 1572.

In July 1573 Harrison applied for the post of master of the grammar school of Aylsham, Norfolk. He was recommended to Bishop John Parkhurst by the mayor and some of the aldermen of Norwich, with reasons excusing Harrison for having raised an objection to the use of the service of the Book of Common Prayer at his marriage. Parkhurst made difficulties, including that the liturgical offence had been in the face of warnings; but finally gave way after an appeal from inhabitants of Aylsham. Within a month of his appointment Harrison requested that changes might be made in the baptismal service on the occasion of his being godfather to an infant, and he was removed by the bishop in January 1574.

Harrison returned to Cambridge with a view to taking orders in the Church of England orders. He was dissuaded by Robert Browne. Subsequently he became master of a hospital in Norwich (perhaps the hospital of St. Giles, or the Old Men's Hospital, which had some connection with Aylsham). Browne visited him at Norwich and lodged and boarded with him and his wife. In his autobiographical A True and Short Declaration, Browne placed Harrison first in the list of his helpers and disciples. According to Browne's narrative, Harrison came completely over to his views, and the two spent all their energies in preaching and collecting a congregation at Norwich.

In April 1581 Bishop Edmund Freke of Norwich sent formal articles of complaint against Browne and Harrison to Lord Burghley, and the whole congregation decided to migrate to Middelburg in Zeeland in the autumn of that year. Harrison, according to his own account, suffered imprisonment before leaving England. At Middelburg the refugees enjoyed freedom of worship, and wrote tracts explaining their views, which were shipped over to England. Two men were hanged for distributing them, and a royal proclamation issued against them in June 1583. The cost of printing these "Brownist" tracts was apparently borne largely by Harrison.

Conflicts arose among the members of the Middelburg congregation. Browne broke with Harrison and sailed for Scotland with a few followers in November or December 1583. Harrison as head of the congregation, made an unsuccessful effort to join it to the Conforming Church of English merchants presided over by Thomas Cartwright and Dudley Fenner.

Harrison died about 1585.

== Works ==
Harrison wrote two of the prohibited books:

- A Little Treatise uppon the firste verse of the 122nd Psalm. Stirring up unto carefull desiring and dutiful labouring for true Church Gouvernement, R. H., 1583, reprinted at Leyden, 1618. The preface states that the book is a fragment of a work on church government. A manuscript of such a work was published in 1952. Harrison's part in writing it remains unclear, however, since part is closely related to a work now attributed to Henry Barrowe.
- Three formes of Catechismes, conteyning the most principal pointes of Religion, 1583.

Correspondence with Cartwright led to An Answere to Master Cartwright his Letter for joyning with the English Churches: whereunto the true copie of his sayde Letter is annexed, London.

Harrison is also credited with:

- Of Ghostes and Spirites walking by night, and of strange noyses, crackes, and sundry forewarninges, which commonly happen before the death of menne, great slaughters and alterations of kyngdomes. One Booke. Written by Lewes Lavaterus of Tigurine, and translated into Englyshe by R. H., London,1572 and 1596. Translation of a demonological work by Ludwig Lavater.
- A boke of the forme of common prayers, administration of the Sacramentes, &c., agreeable to Gods worde and the use of the Reformed Churches, 1586, 1587;

and possibly

- Master R. H. His letter to the B. of Norwich, 1576 (in A Parte of a Register, pp. 365–70).

A Theologicall Discourse of the Lamb of God and His enemies, London, 1590, which has been attributed to Harrison, is by Richard Harvey.

== Notes ==
Attribution

This article incorporates text from a publication now in the public domain: Stephen, Leslie; Lee, Sidney, eds. (1891). "Harrison, Robert (d.1585?)". Dictionary of National Biography. Vol. 25. London: Smith, Elder & Co.
