= John Greenwood (divine) =

English minister and divine (1556–1593)

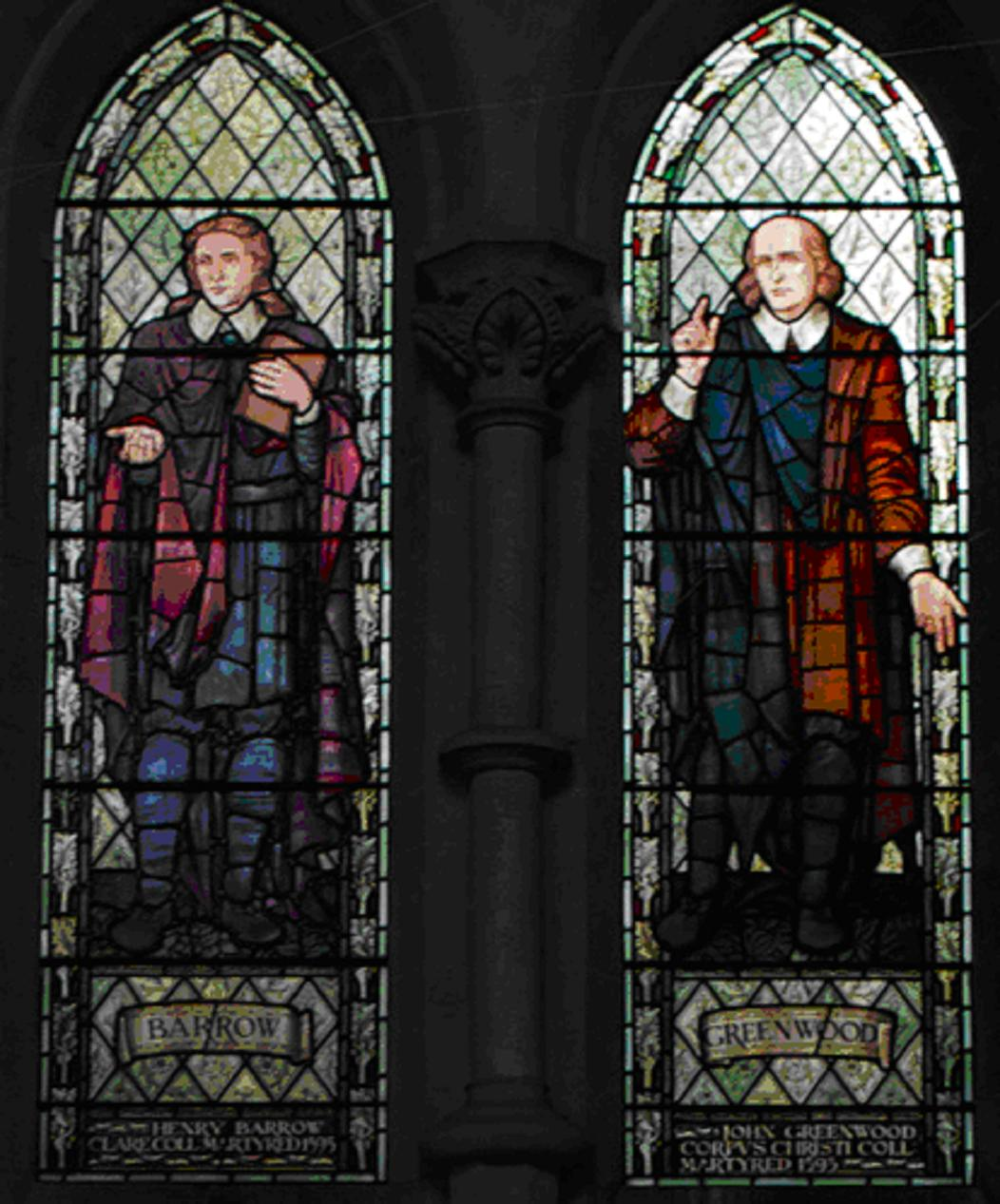
Henry Barrow (left) and John Greenwood, stained glass windows at Emmanuel United Reformed Church, Cambridge

John Greenwood (1556 – 6 April 1593) was an English Separatist Puritan, or Brownist, minister who was executed for his faith. He led the London underground church from 1587 to 1593 and wrote several works of Brownist apologetics, working closely with Henry Barrow.

== Life ==
Greenwood was born in 1556 in Heptonstall, West Riding, Yorkshire, England. He entered as a sizar at Corpus Christi College, Cambridge, on 18 March 1577/1578, and commenced B.A. 1581.

Whether he was directly influenced by the teaching of Robert Browne, a graduate of the same college, is uncertain; in any case he held strong Puritan opinions, which ultimately led him to Separatism of the most rigid type. In 1581 he was chaplain to Lord Rich, at Rochford, Essex. He had been made deacon by John Aylmer, Bishop of London, and priest by Thomas Cooper, Bishop of Lincoln. He was appointed Vicar of All Saints, Rackheath, in Norfolk, just five miles from the surviving Brownist church of Norwich. Around September 1585, Greenwood embraced Brownism, renounced this ordination as "wholly unlawful," resigned from All Saints, and travelled to London to join the underground church.

Details of the next few years are lacking; but by 1586 he was the recognized leader of the London Separatists, of whom a considerable number had been imprisoned at various times since 1567. Greenwood was arrested on 8 October 1586, along with 20 others, when their service was raided in the house of Henry Martin in the parish of St Andrew-by- the Wardrobe, and held in the Clink prison.

Greenwood was interrogated at the Newgate Sessions under the 1581 Recusancy Act, fined £260 and moved to the Fleet Prison. During his imprisonment he wrote some controversial tracts in conjunction with his fellow prisoner Henry Barrow, Mrs Greenwood smuggling the pages out of prison and their maid Cycely smuggling the books back in. He was formerly thought to have been at liberty in the autumn of 1588; but this was probably merely "the liberty of the prison." However, Greenwood was released in July 1592, after four years in the Fleet, and he was elected "teacher" of the underground church.

Meanwhile, in 1590, Greenwood wrote "An Answer to George Gifford's pretended Defence of Read Prayers", which like much of his writing argued that prayer must be spontaneous, and even the Lord's Prayer should not be used in worship. On 5 December 1592 he was again arrested; and in March 1593 he was tried, together with Barrowe, and condemned to death on a charge of "devising and circulating seditious books." After two respites, one at the foot of the gallows, he was hanged on May 23, 1593, in Tyburn, Middlesex.

== Authorities ==
- H. M. Dexter, Congregationalism during the last three hundred years; The England and Holland of the Pilgrims;
- F. J. Powicke, Henry Barrowe and the Exiled Church of Amsterdam;
- Benjamin Brook, Lives of the Puritans;
- C. H. Cooper, Athenae Cantabrigienses, vol. ii.
- Stephen Tomkins, The Journey to the Mayflower
- BR White The English Separatist Tradition
