= George Gifford (Puritan) =

English Puritan preacher

George Gifford (c. 1548–1600) was a Puritan preacher at Maldon, Essex.

== Life ==
Gifford was born in Dry Drayton, near Cambridge and attended Christ's College, Cambridge, graduating BA in 1570 and MA in 1573. He afterwards lived at Maldon, but was discharged from the priesthood for refusing to subscribe to Archbishop Whitgift's articles of conformity. He was later reinstated as a lecturer at Maldon, serving there as a lecturer until his death in 1600.

It is possible that in 1586 he attended the deathbed of Sir Philip Sidney in the Low Countries, where Gifford was serving as chaplain to the Earl of Essex's troops. Gifford may well have penned The Manner of Sir Philip Sidney's Death.

== Works ==
Gifford wrote some twenty-two published works. These include a translation of William Fulke's Praelections vpon the sacred and holy Reuelation of S. Iohn (1573; STC:11443); A briefe discourse of certaine points of the religion which is among the common sort of Christians, which may bee termed the countrie diunitie (1581; STC:11845), which was his most popular work; A dialogue betweene a Papist and a Protestant (1582; STC:11849); and two works on witchcraft, A discourse of the subtill practises of deuilles by witches and sorcerers (1587; STC:11852) and A Dialogue Concerning Witches and Witchcrafts (1593; STC:11850). It is the last work for which he is best known.

Gifford was a moderate in the witchcraft debate, although he still believed in the existence of witches, and that they should be severely punished. His main concern in the Dialogue was to ensure more care was taken in witchcraft prosecutions, and to attempt to restrain the persecuting fervour with which witches were sought out and indicted.
