= Henry Barrowe =

English Separatist Puritan (c. 1550 – 1593)

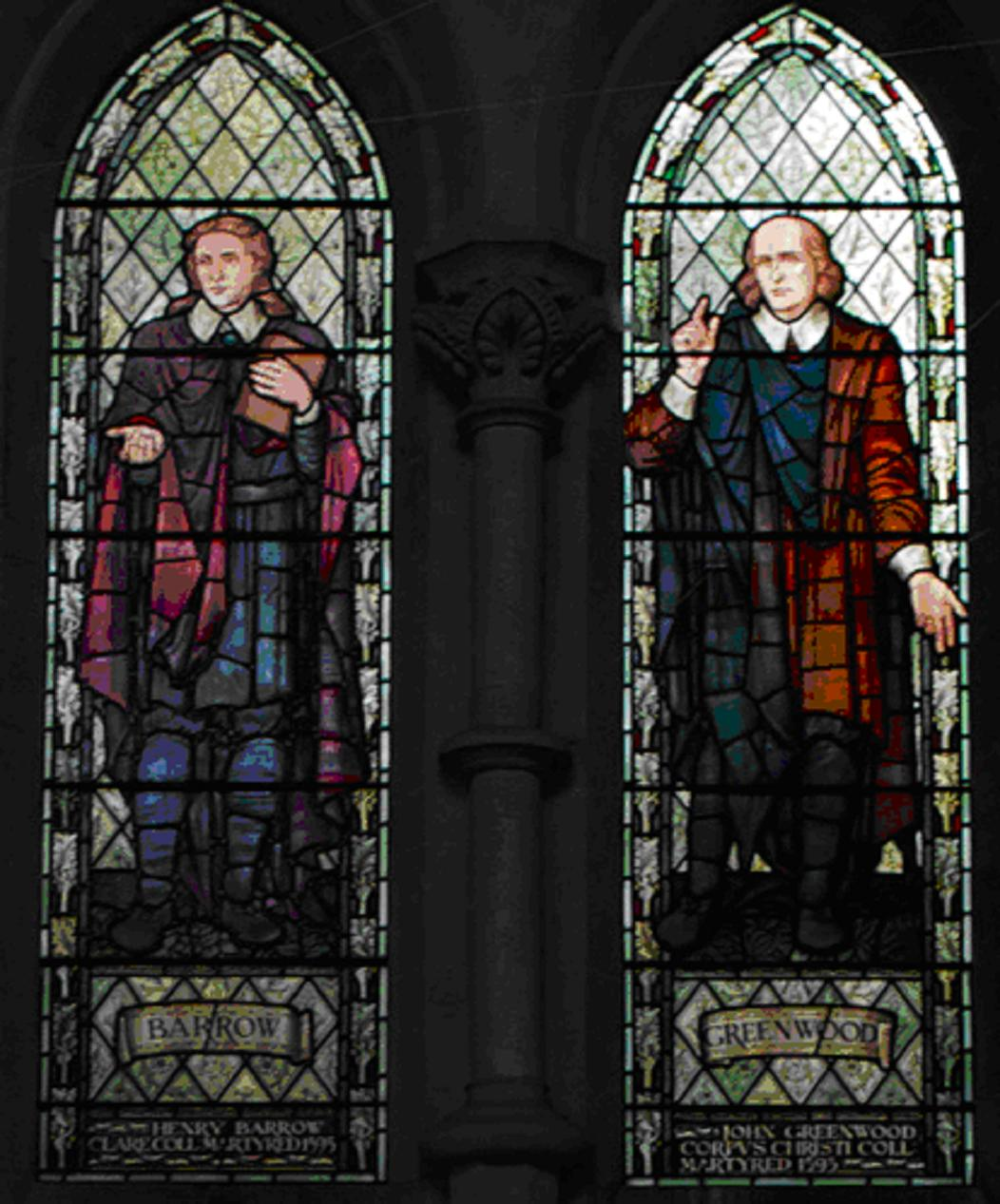
Henry Barrowe (left) and John Greenwood, stained-glass windows at Emmanuel United Reformed Church, Cambridge

Henry Barrow (or Barrowe) (c. 1550 – 6 April 1593) was an English Separatist Puritan, or Brownist, who was executed for his views. He led the London underground church from 1587 to 1593; spent most of that time in prison; and wrote numerous works of Brownist apologetics, most notably A Brief Discoverie of the False Church.

== Life ==
Barrow was born about 1550, in Norfolk, of a family related by marriage to Nicholas Bacon, and probably to John Aylmer, Bishop of London. He matriculated at Clare College, Cambridge (then called Clare Hall), in November 1566, and graduated B.A. in 1569–1570. Afterwards he "followed the court" for some time, leading a frivolous if not licentious life. According to John Cotton, Barrow gambled a lot and would boast of spending his winnings ‘in the bosoms of his courtesans’. He was a member of Gray's Inn for a few years from 1576, but was never called to the bar.

Early in 1586, Barrow was converted to puritanism by a sermon in a church he had been walking past. Eighteen months later he attempted to write a rebuttal of one of Robert Browne's separatist works, but instead was converted by it. Subsequently, he came into close relations with John Greenwood, the Separatist leader. He became associated with the London underground church, the illegal Brownist congregation that had been meetings secretly since the late 1560s.

Greenwood was imprisoned in The Clink, and when Barrow visited him on 19 November 1587 he was detained by the gaoler and brought before Archbishop John Whitgift. He insisted on the illegality of this arrest, refused either to take the ex officio oath or to give bail for future appearance, and was committed to the Gatehouse Prison. After nearly six months' detention and several irregular examinations before the high commissioners, he and Greenwood were formally indicted at the Newgate Sessions in May 1588 under the 1581 Recusancy Act (originally directed against Roman Catholics). They were fined £260, then moved to the Fleet prison.

Barrow was subjected to several more examinations, once before the Privy Council at Whitehall on 18 March 1589, as a result of petition to the Queen. On these occasions he maintained the principle of separatism, denouncing the prescribed ritual of the Church as "a false worship," and the bishops as oppressors and persecutors.

During his imprisonments Barrow was engaged in written controversy with Robert Browne (down to 1588), who had yielded a partial submission to the established order, and whom he therefore counted as a renegade. He also wrote several treatises in defence of separatism and congregational independency, including:

- A True Description of the Visible Congregation of the Saints, &c. (1589)
- A Plain Refutation of Mr Gifford’s Booke, intituled A Short Treatise Gainst the Donatistes of England (1590–1591)
- A Brief Discovery of the False Church (1590).

Others were written in conjunction with his fellow-prisoner, Greenwood. These writings were entrusted to friends and sent to the Netherlands for publication.

By 1590 the bishops had sent several conforming Puritan ministers to confer with these controversialists, but without effect. In 1592 Greenwood, Barrow and John Penry gained a temporary reprieve and began meeting at a house in the Borough and formally constituted the Southwark Independent Church.

Barrow and Greenwood were returned to the Clink in 1593. It was resolved to proceed on a capital charge of "devising and circulating seditious books". As the law then stood, it was easy to secure a conviction. They were tried and sentenced to death on 23 March 1593. The day after the sentence, they were brought out as if for execution and respited. On 31 March they were taken to the gallows, and after the ropes had been placed about their necks, they were again respited. Finally, they were hanged early on the morning of 6 April. There is some evidence that Lord Treasurer Burghley endeavoured to save their lives and was frustrated by Whitgift and other bishops.

== Views ==
The opinions of Browne and Barrow had much in common, but were not identical. Both maintained the right and duty of the Church to carry out necessary reforms without awaiting the permission of the civil power; and both advocated congregational independency. But the ideal of Browne was a spiritual democracy, towards which separation was only a means. Barrow, on the other hand, regarded the whole established church order as polluted by the relics of Roman Catholicism, and insisted on separation as essential to pure worship and discipline. Barrowe also differed from Robert Browne regarding church governance, preferring placing it in the hands of elders rather than the entire congregation, as he distrusted too much democracy.

Barrow has been credited by H. M. Dexter and others with being the author of the Marprelate Tracts; but this is not generally accepted.
