= Robert Browne (Brownist) =

English religious leader (1550s – 1633)

Robert Browne (1550s – 1633) was the founder of the Brownists, a common designation for early Separatists from the Church of England before 1620. In later life he was reconciled to the established church and became an Anglican priest.

== Biography ==
Browne was born at Tolethorpe Hall in Little Casterton, Rutland, England, about 1550, and was the third of seven children of Anthony Browne and his wife Dorothy, a daughter of Sir Philip Boteler. In 1572 he graduated from Corpus Christi College, Cambridge. It was probably while Browne was at Corpus Christi that he first met Robert Harrison from Norwich. They were both influenced by the Puritan theologian Thomas Cartwright. It has been claimed that after leaving Cambridge Browne was a schoolmaster at Oundle School.

Browne became a lecturer at St Mary's Church, Islington, where his dissident preaching against the doctrines and disciplines of the Church of England began to attract attention. During 1578 he returned to Cambridge and came under the influence of Richard Greenham, Puritan rector of Dry Drayton, near Cambridge. Browne may have been encouraged to complete his ordination and serve at a parish church. He was offered a lecturer position at St Bene't's Church, Cambridge possibly through Greenham, but his tenure there was short lived. He may have come to reject the Puritan view of reform from within the Church, and started to look outside the established Church.

Browne was the first seceder from the Church of England and the first to found a church of his own on Congregational principles. By 1581 he had attempted to set up a separate church in Norwich; he was arrested but released on the advice of William Cecil, his kinsman. Browne and companions left England and moved to Middelburg in the Netherlands later in 1581. There they organised a church on what they conceived to be the New Testament model, but the community broke up within two years owing to internal dissensions.

His most important works, A Treatise of Reformation without Tarying for Anie, in which he asserted the right of the church to effect necessary reforms without the authorisation of the civil magistrate; and A Booke which sheweth the life and manners of all True Christians which set out the theory of congregational independency, were published at Middelburg in 1582. The following year two men were hanged at Bury St Edmunds for circulating them.

Browne was only an active Separatist from 1579 to 1585 and returned to the Church of England. He served as Headmaster of St Olave's Grammar School, Southwark 1586–89 and was also Headmaster of Stamford School between 1589 and 1591. He was much engaged in controversy with some of those who held his earlier separatist position and who now looked upon him as a renegade. In particular he several times replied to John Greenwood and Henry Barrowe; one of his replies, entitled A Reproofe of certaine schismatical persons and their doctrine touching the hearing and preaching of the word of God (1587–1588) sheds light upon the development of Browne's later views.

He was ordained deacon and priest by Richard Howland, Bishop of Peterborough in September 1591. He held the benefice of Little Casterton (in which parish Tolethorpe lay) and then Thorpe Achurch in Northamptonshire from 1591 to 1631.

=== Personal life ===
He was married twice, firstly to Alice Allen, thought to be one of his Middelburg congregation, with whom he fathered nine children. Alice Browne died in July 1610 and in February 1612 Browne married Elizabeth Werrener at St Martin's Church, Stamford.

=== Death ===
Browne was imprisoned 32 times during his life for his non-conformist beliefs.

In 1633, Browne became embroiled in a dispute with his godson, who was the Constable of the Lilford estate, regarding the payment of rates, which proceeded to blows. Browne was arraigned in court, where he was so insolent to the Justice that Browne was put in Northampton Gaol, where he fell ill and died.

Browne is buried in St Giles's churchyard, Northampton.

== Legacy ==
He is considered the father of the Congregational body in the English-speaking world. He is also considered "The Father of the Pilgrims" due to the Mayflower passengers in 1620 being part of the Brownist movement.

He is commemorated as a reformer of the church in the calendar of the Uniting Church in Australia on 5 September.

== Works ==
- A True and Short Declaration (1581)
- A Treatise of Reformation without Tarrying for any and of the Wickedness of those Preachers which will not reform till the Magistrate command or compel them (1582) - The church had a right to effect necessary reforms without permission of civil magistrate
- A Book which sheweth the Life and Manners of all true Christians (1582) – defines congregational autonomy
- An answere to master Cartwright his letter for ioyning with the English Church (1583)
- A true and short declaration, both of the gathering and ioyning together of certaine persons, and also of the lamentable breach and division which fell amongst them (1583)
- A Reproof of Certain Schismatical Persons (15??)
- A New Year's Guift (1589)
- A Treatise upon the 23 of Matthewe

== See also ==
- History of the Puritans under Elizabeth I
