= History of the Puritans in North America =

Beginnings of Puritanism in Colonial America

In the early 17th century, thousands of English Puritans settled in North America, almost all in New England. Puritans were intensely devout members of the Church of England who believed that the Church of England was insufficiently reformed, retaining too much of its Roman Catholic doctrinal roots, and who therefore opposed royal ecclesiastical policy. Most Puritans were "non-separating Puritans" who believed there should be an established church and did not advocate setting up separate congregations distinct from the Church of England; these were later called Nonconformists. A small minority of Puritans were "separating Puritans" who advocated for local, doctrinally similar, church congregations but no state established church. The Pilgrims, unlike most of New England's puritans, were a Separatist group, and they established the Plymouth Colony in 1620. Puritans went chiefly to New England, but small numbers went to other English colonies up and down the Atlantic.

Puritans played the leading roles in establishing the Massachusetts Bay Colony in 1629, the Saybrook Colony in 1635, the Connecticut Colony in 1636, and the New Haven Colony in 1638. The Colony of Rhode Island and Providence Plantations was established by settlers expelled from Massachusetts because of their unorthodox religious opinions. Puritans were also active in New Hampshire before it became a crown colony in 1691. Puritanism as a powerful force weakened early in the 18th century and before 1740 was replaced by the much milder Congregational church.

== Background (1533–1630) ==
Puritanism was a Protestant movement that emerged in 16th-century England with the goal of transforming it into a godly society by reforming or purifying the Church of England of all remaining Roman Catholic teachings and practices. During the reign of Elizabeth I, Puritans were for the most part tolerated within the established church. Like Puritans, most English Protestants at the time were Calvinist in their theology, and many bishops and Privy Council members were sympathetic to Puritan objectives. The major point of controversy between Puritans and church authorities was over liturgical ceremonies Puritans thought too Catholic, such as wearing clerical vestments, kneeling to receive Holy Communion, and making the sign of the cross during baptism.

During the reign of James I, most Puritans were no longer willing to wait for further church reforms and separated from the Church of England. Since the law required everyone to attend parish services, these Separatists were vulnerable to criminal prosecution, and some such as Henry Barrowe and John Greenwood were executed. To escape persecution and worship freely, some Separatists migrated to the Netherlands. Nevertheless, most Puritans remained within the Church of England.

Under Charles I, Calvinist teachings were undermined, and bishops became less tolerant of Puritan views and more willing to enforce the use of controversial ceremonies. Controls were placed on Puritan preaching, and some ministers were suspended or removed from their livings. Increasingly, many Puritans concluded that they had no choice but to emigrate.

== Migration to America (1620–1642) ==
The Pilgrims originated as an dissenting congregation in the small English village of Scrooby led by Richard Clyfton, John Robinson and William Brewster. This congregation was subject to persecution by the Church of England with members being imprisoned or having property seized. Fearing greater persecution, the group left England and settled in the Dutch city of Leiden. In 1620, after receiving a patent from the London Company, the Pilgrims left for New England on board the Mayflower, landing at Plymouth Rock. The Pilgrims are remembered for creating the Mayflower Compact, a social contract based on Puritan political theory and in imitation of the church covenant they had made at the church in Scrooby.

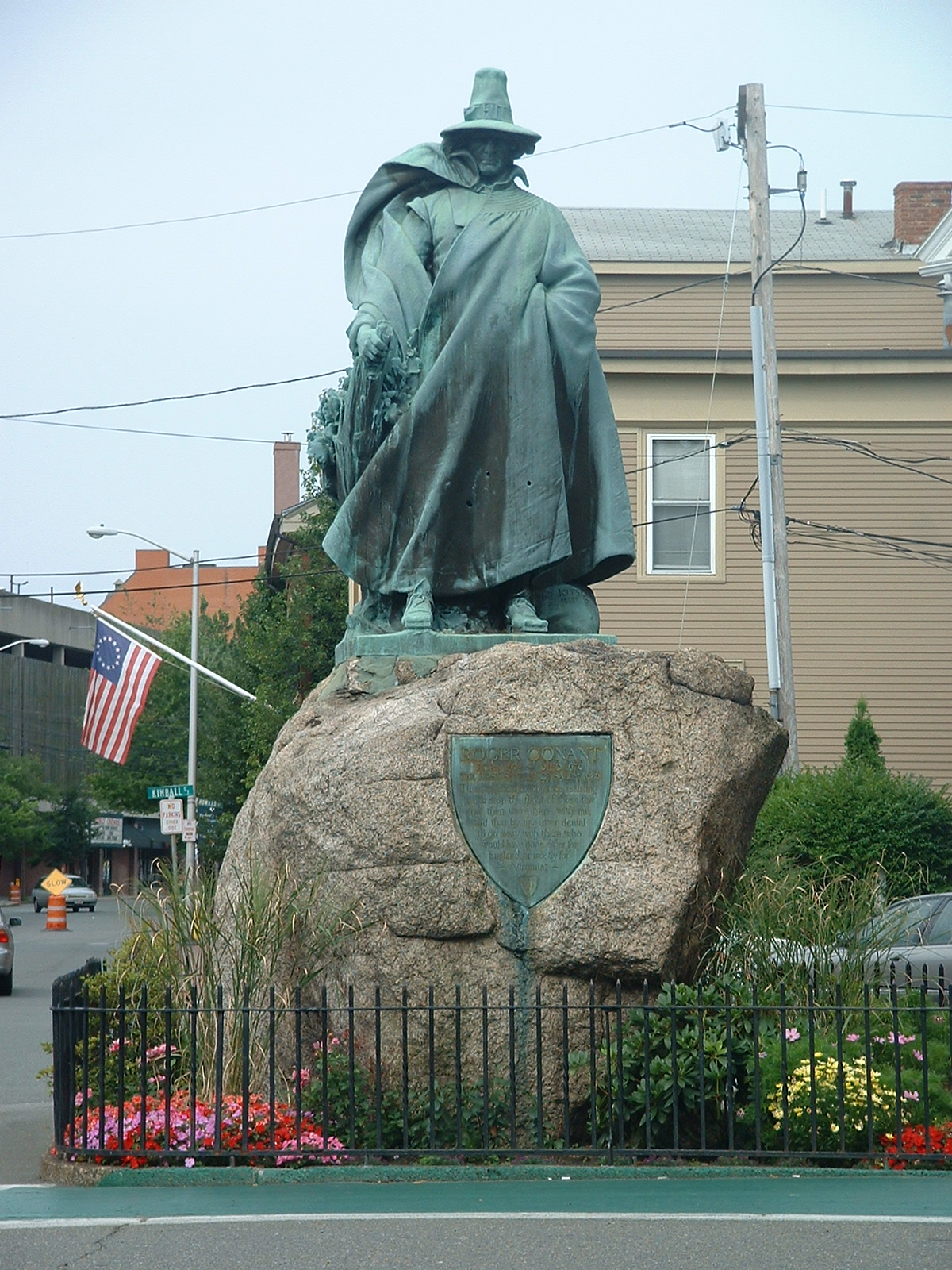
Early Puritan leader Roger Conant led a group of settlers to found Salem, Massachusetts in 1626.

Two of the Pilgrim settlers in Plymouth Colony—Robert Cushman and Edward Winslow—believed that Cape Ann would be a profitable location for a settlement. They therefore organized a company named the Dorchester Company and in 1622 sailed to England seeking a patent from the London Company giving them permission to settle there. They were successful and were granted the Sheffield Patent (named after Edmund, Lord Sheffield, the member of the Plymouth Company who granted the patent). On the basis of this patent, Roger Conant led a group of fishermen from the area later called Gloucester to found Salem in 1626, being replaced as governor by John Endecott in 1628 or 1629.

Other Puritans were convinced that New England could provide a religious refuge, and the enterprise was reorganized as the Massachusetts Bay Company. In March 1629, it succeeded in obtaining from King Charles a royal charter for the establishment of the Massachusetts Bay Colony. In 1630, the first ships of the Great Puritan Migration sailed to the New World, led by John Winthrop.

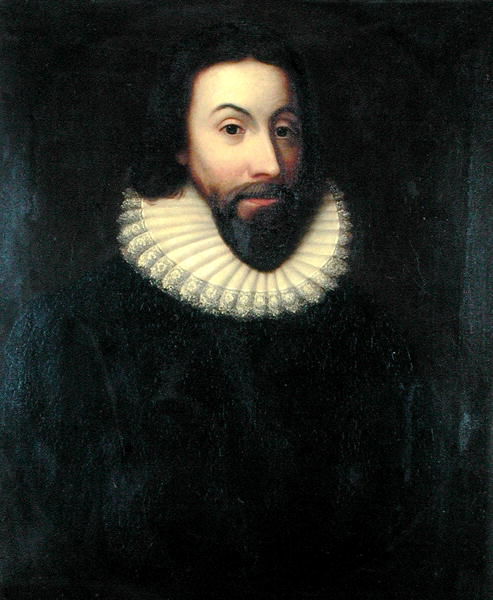
John Winthrop (1587/8-1649), Governor of the Massachusetts Bay Colony, who led the Puritans in the Great Migration, beginning in 1630.

During the crossing, Winthrop preached a sermon entitled "A Model of Christian Charity", in which he told his followers that they had entered a covenant with God according to which he would cause them to prosper if they maintained their commitment to God. In doing so, their new colony would become a "City upon a Hill", meaning that they would be a model to all the nations of Europe as to what a properly reformed Christian commonwealth should look like.

Most of the Puritans who emigrated settled in the New England area. However, the Great Migration of Puritans was relatively short-lived and very large. It began in earnest in 1629 with the founding of the Massachusetts Bay Colony, and ended in 1642 with the start of the English Civil War when King Charles I effectively shut off immigration to the colonies. Emigration was officially restricted to conforming churchmen in December 1634 by his Privy Council. From 1629 through 1643, approximately 21,000 Puritans immigrated to New England.

The immigration was primarily an exodus of families. Between 1630 and 1640, over 13,000 men, women, and children sailed to Massachusetts. The religious and political factors behind the Great Migration influenced the demographics of the emigrants. Groups of young men seeking economic success predominated the Virginia colonies, whereas Puritan ships were laden with "ordinary" people, old and young, families as well as individuals. Just a quarter of the emigrants were in their twenties when they boarded ships in the 1630s, making young adults a minority in New England settlements. The New World Puritan population was more of a cross-section in the age of the English population than those of other colonies. This meant that the Massachusetts Bay Colony retained a relatively normal population composition. In the colony of Virginia, the ratio of colonist men to women was 4:1 in the early decades and at least 2:1 in later decades, and only limited intermarriage took place with Native women. By contrast, nearly half of the Puritan immigrants to the New World were women, and there was very little intermarriage with Native Americans. The majority of families who traveled to Massachusetts Bay were families in progress, with parents who were not yet through with their reproductive years and whose continued fertility made New England's population growth possible. The women who emigrated were critical agents in the success of the establishment and maintenance of the Puritan colonies in North America. Success in the early colonial economy depended largely on labor, which was conducted by members of Puritan families.

=== Other destinations ===
The struggle between the assertive Church of England and various Presbyterian and Puritan groups extended throughout the English realm in the 17th century, prompting not only the emigration of British Presbyterians from Ireland to North America (the Scotch-Irish), but prompting emigration from Bermuda, England's second-oldest overseas territory. Roughly 10,000 Bermudians emigrated before 1775. Most of these went to the American colonies, founding or contributing to settlements throughout the South, especially. Many went to the Bahamas, where Bermudian Independent Puritan families, under the leadership of William Sayle, had established the colony of Eleuthera in 1648.

Emigration resumed under the rule of Oliver Cromwell in the 1650s but not in large numbers as there was no longer any need to escape persecution in England. Some Puritans returned to England during the English Civil War. They were on the winning side and remained under Cromwell's Puritanical rule.

== Life in the New World ==
Puritan dominance in the New World lasted until the early 18th century. That era can be broken down into three parts: the generation of John Cotton and Richard Mather (1630–62) from the founding to the Restoration, years of virtual independence and nearly autonomous development; the generation of Increase Mather (1662–89) from the Restoration and the Halfway Covenant to the Glorious Revolution, years of struggle with the British crown; and the generation of Cotton Mather (1689–1728) from the overthrow of Edmund Andros (in which Cotton Mather played a part) and the new charter, mediated by Increase Mather, to the death of Cotton Mather.

=== Religion ===
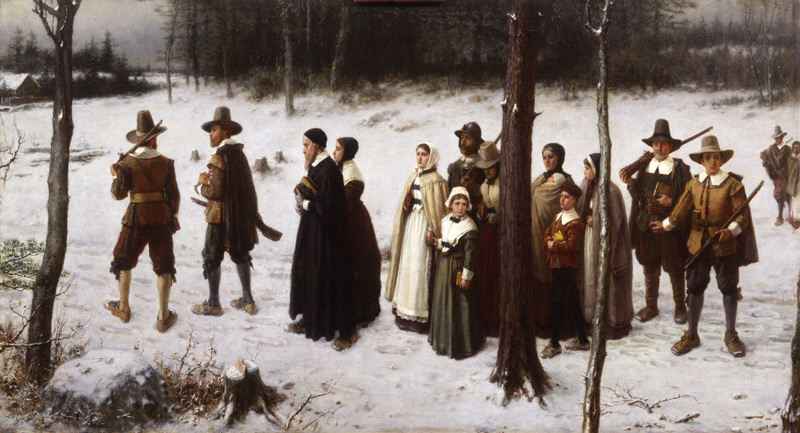
Pilgrims Going to Church by George Henry Boughton (1867)

Once in New England, the Puritans established Congregational churches that subscribed to Reformed theology. The Savoy Declaration, a modification of the Westminster Confession of Faith, was adopted as a confessional statement by the churches in Massachusetts in 1680 and the churches of Connecticut in 1708.

The Cambridge Platform describes Congregationalist polity as practiced by Puritans in the 17th century. Every congregation was founded upon a church covenant, a written agreement signed by all members in which they agreed to uphold congregational principles, to be guided by sola scriptura in their decision making, and to submit to church discipline. The right of each congregation to elect its own officers and manage its own affairs was upheld.

For church offices, Puritans imitated the model developed in Calvinist Geneva. There were two major offices: elder (or presbyter) and deacon. Initially, there were two types of elders. Ministers, whose responsibilities included preaching and administering the sacraments, were referred to as teaching elders. Large churches would have two ministers, one to serve as pastor and the other to serve as teacher. Prominent laymen would be elected for life as ruling elders and could preach.

The essential Puritan belief was that people are saved by grace alone and not by any merit from doing good works. At the same time, Puritans also believed that men and women "could labor to make themselves appropriate vessels of saving grace" [emphasis in original]. They could accomplish this through Bible reading, prayer, and doing good works. This doctrine was called preparationism, and nearly all Puritans were preparationists to some extent. The process of conversion was described in different ways, but most ministers agreed that there were three essential stages. The first stage was humiliation or sorrow for having sinned against God. The second stage was justification or adoption characterized by a sense of having been forgiven and accepted by God through Christ's mercy. The third stage was sanctification, the ability to live a holy life out of gladness toward God.

Puritans believed churches should be composed of "visible saints" or the elect. To ensure that only regenerated persons were admitted as full members, New England churches required prospective members to provide a conversion narrative describing their personal conversion experience. All settlers were required to attend church services and were subject to church discipline. The Lord's Supper, however, was reserved to full members only. Puritans practiced infant baptism, but only church members in full communion could present their children for baptism. Members' children were considered part of the church and covenant by birth and were entitled to baptism. Nevertheless, these children would not enjoy the full privileges of church membership until they provided a public account of conversion.

Church services were held in the morning and afternoon on Sunday, and there was usually a mid-week service. The ruling elders and deacons sat facing the congregation on a raised seat. Men and women sat on opposite sides of the meeting house, and children sat in their own section under the oversight of a tithingman, who corrected unruly children (or sleeping adults) with a long staff. The pastor opened the service with prayer for about 15 minutes, the teacher then read and explained the selected Bible passage, and a ruling elder then led in singing a Psalm, usually from the Bay Psalm Book. The pastor then preached for an hour or more, and the teacher ended the service with prayer and benediction. In churches with only one minister, the morning sermon was devoted to the argument (interpreting the biblical text and justifying that interpretation) and the afternoon sermon to its application (the lessons that could be drawn from the text for the individual or for the collective community).

=== Church and state ===
For Puritans, the people of society were bound together by a social covenant (such as Plymouth's Mayflower Compact, Connecticut's Fundamental Orders, New Haven's Fundamental Agreement, and Massachusetts' colonial charter). Having entered into such a covenant, eligible voters were responsible for choosing qualified men to govern and to obey such rulers, who ultimately received their authority from God and were responsible for using it to promote the common good. If the ruler was evil, however, the people were justified in opposing and rebelling against him. Such notions helped New Englanders justify their support for the Parliamentary cause in the English Civil War of the 1640s, and later the Glorious Revolution of 1688 and the American Revolution of 1775.

The Puritans also believed they were in a national covenant with God. They believed they were chosen by God to help redeem the world by their total obedience to his will. If they were true to the covenant, they would be blessed; if not, they would fail. Within this worldview, it was the government's responsibility to enforce moral standards and ensure true religious worship was established and maintained. In the Puritan colonies, the Congregational church functioned as a state religion. In Massachusetts, no new church could be established without the permission of the colony's existing Congregational churches and the government. Likewise, Connecticut allowed only one church per town or parish, which had to be Congregational.

All residents in Massachusetts and Connecticut were required to pay taxes for the support of the Congregational churches, even if they were religious dissenters. The franchise was limited to Congregational church members in Massachusetts and New Haven, but voting rights were more extensive in Connecticut and Plymouth. In Connecticut, church attendance on Sundays was mandatory (for both church members and non-members), and those who failed to attend were fined.

There was a greater separation of church and state in the Puritan commonwealths than existed anywhere in Europe at the time. In England, the king was head of both church and state, bishops sat in Parliament and the Privy Council, and church officials exercised many secular functions. In New England, secular matters were handled only by civil authorities, and those who held offices in the church were barred from holding positions in the civil government. When dealing with unorthodox persons, Puritans believed that the church, as a spiritual organization, was limited to "attempting to persuade the individual of his error, to warn him of the dangers he faced if he publicly persisted in it, and—as a last resort—to expel him from the spiritual society by ex-communication." Citizens who lost church membership by excommunication retained the right to vote in civil affairs.

=== Religious intoleration ===
The Puritans did not come to America to establish a theocracy, but neither did they institute religious freedom. Puritans believed that the state was obligated to protect society from heresy, and it was empowered to use corporal punishment, banishment, and execution. New England magistrates did not investigate private views, but they did take action against public dissent from the religious establishment.

Puritan sentiments were expressed by Nathaniel Ward in The Simple Cobbler of Agawam: "all Familists, Antinomians, Anabaptists, and other Enthusiasts shall have free Liberty to keep away from us, and such as will come [shall have liberty] to be gone as fast as they can, the sooner the better."

==== Quakers ====
The period 1658–1692 saw the execution of Quakers and the imprisonment of Baptists. Quakers were initially banished by colonial courts, but they often returned in defiance of authorities. Historian Daniel Boorstin stated, "the Puritans had not sought out the Quakers in order to punish them; the Quakers had come in quest of punishment."

Civil and religious restrictions were most strictly applied by the Puritans of Massachusetts which saw various banishments applied to dissenters to enforce conformity, including the branding iron, the whipping post, the bilboes and the hangman's noose. Notable individuals persecuted by the Puritans include Anne Hutchinson who was banished to Rhode Island during the Antinomian Controversy and Quaker Mary Dyer who was hanged in Boston for repeatedly defying a Puritan law banning Quakers from the colony. Dyer was one of the four executed Quakers known as the Boston martyrs. Executions ceased in 1661 when King Charles II explicitly forbade Massachusetts from executing anyone for professing Quakerism.

==== Jesuits ====
In 1647, Massachusetts passed a law prohibiting any Jesuit Catholic priests from entering territory under Puritan jurisdiction. Any suspected person who could not clear himself was to be banished from the colony; a second offence carried a death penalty.

=== Family life ===
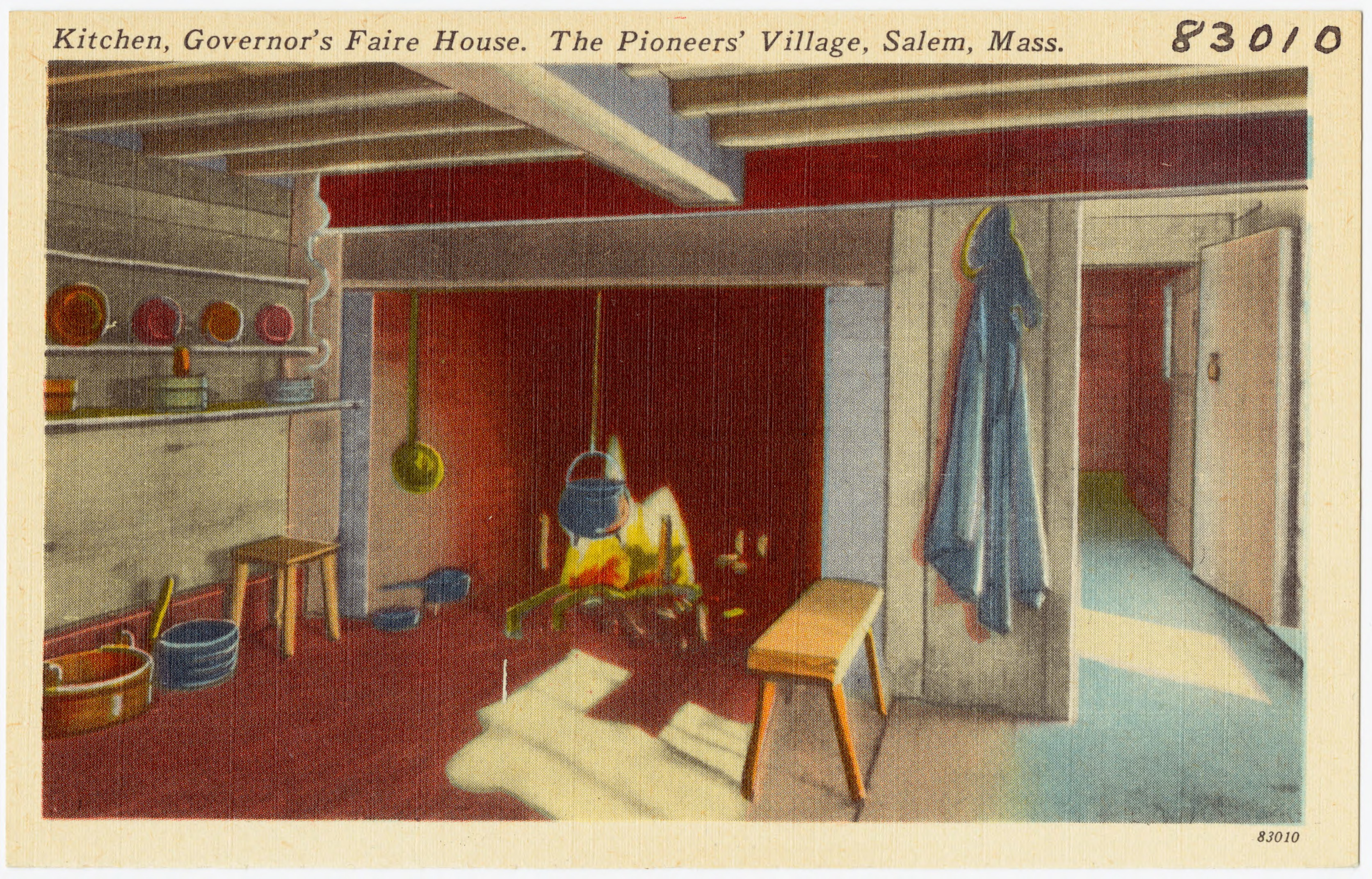
Pioneer Village in Salem, Massachusetts is a recreation of the original Puritan settlement.

For Puritans, the family was the "locus of spiritual and civic development and protection", and marriage was the foundation of the family and, therefore, society. Unlike in England, where people were married by ministers in the church according to the Book of Common Prayer, Puritans saw no biblical justification for church weddings or the exchange of wedding rings. While marriage held great religious significance for Puritans—they saw it as a covenant relationship freely entered into by both man and wife—the wedding was viewed as a private, contractual event officiated by a civil magistrate either in the home of the magistrate or a member of the bridal party. Massachusetts ministers were not legally permitted to solemnize marriages until 1686 after the colony had been placed under royal control, but by 1726 it had become the accepted tradition.

According to scholars Gerald Moran and Maris Vinovskis, some historians argue that Puritan child-rearing was repressive. Central to this argument is the views of John Robinson, the Pilgrims' first pastor, who wrote in a 1625 treatise "Of Children and Their Education", "And surely there is in all children, though not alike, a stubbornness, and stoutness of mind arising from natural pride, which must, in the first place, be broken and beaten down." Moran and Vinovskis, however, argue that Robinson's views were not representative of 17th-century Puritans. They write that Puritan parents "exercised an authoritative, not an authoritarian, mode of child-rearing" that aimed to cultivate godly affections and reason, with corporal punishment used as a last resort.

=== Education ===
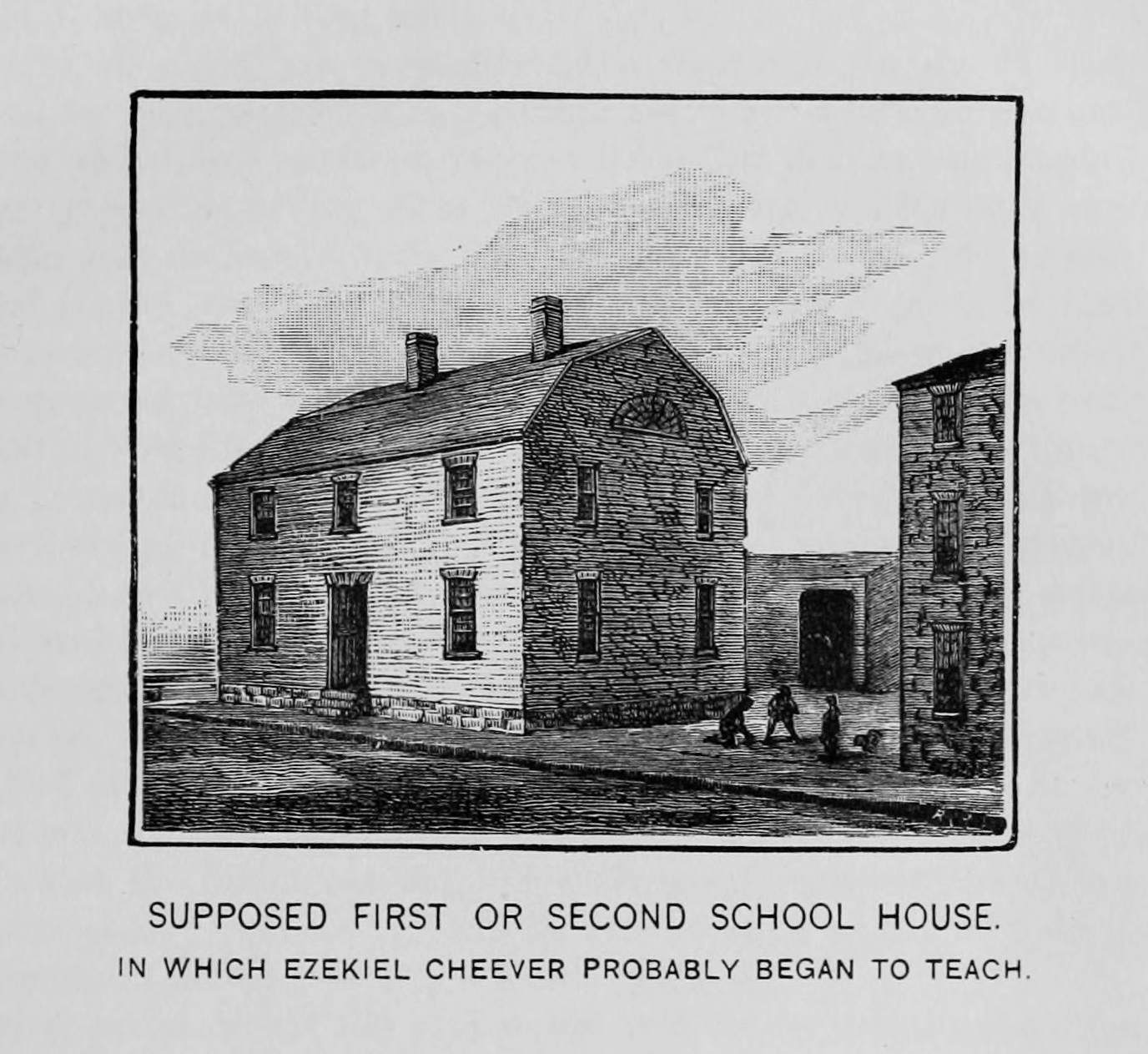
Boston Latin School, opened 1635, is the oldest public school in the United States.

According to historian Bruce C. Daniels, the Puritans were "[o]ne of the most literate groups in the early modern world", with about 60 percent of New England able to read. At a time when the literacy rate in England was less than 30 percent, the Puritan leaders of colonial New England believed children should be educated for both religious and civil reasons, and they worked to achieve universal literacy. In 1642, Massachusetts required heads of households to teach their wives, children, and servants basic reading and writing so that they could read the Bible and understand colonial laws. In 1647, the government required all towns with 50 or more households to hire a teacher and towns of 100 or more households to hire a grammar school instructor to prepare promising boys for college. Boys interested in the ministry were often sent to colleges such as Harvard (founded in 1636) or Yale (founded in 1707).

The Puritans anticipated the educational theories of John Locke and other Enlightenment thinkers. Like Locke's blank slate, Puritans believed that a child's mind was "an empty receptacle, one that had to be infused with the knowledge gained from careful instruction and education." The Puritans in the United States were great believers in education. They wanted their children to be able to read the Bible themselves, and interpret it themselves, rather than have to have a clergyman tell them what it says and means. This then leads to thinking for themselves, which is the basis of democracy.

The Puritans, almost immediately after arriving in America in 1630, set up schools for their sons. They also set up what were called dame schools for their daughters and in other cases taught their daughters at home how to read. As a result, Americans were the most literate people in the world. By the time of the American Revolution, there were 40 newspapers in the United States (at a time when there were only two cities—New York and Philadelphia—with as many as 20,000 people in them).

The Puritans set up a college (Harvard University) only six years after arriving in the United States. By the time of the Revolution, the United States had 10 colleges (while England had only two).

=== Recreation and leisure ===
Puritans did not celebrate traditional holidays such as Christmas, Easter, or May Day. They also did not observe personal annual holidays, such as birthdays or anniversaries. They did, however, celebrate special occasions such as military victories, harvests, ordinations, weddings, and births. These celebrations consisted of food and conversation. Beyond special occasions, the tavern was an important place for people to gather for fellowship on a regular basis.

Increase Mather wrote that dancing was "a natural expression of joy; so that there is no more sin in it than in laughter." Puritans generally discouraged mixed or "promiscuous" dancing between men and women, which according to Mather would lead to "unchaste touches and gesticulations. .. [that] have a palpable tendency to that which is evil." Some ministers, including John Cotton, thought that mixed dancing was appropriate under special circumstances, but all agreed it was a practice not to be encouraged. Dancing was also discouraged at weddings or on holidays (especially dancing around a maypole) and was illegal in taverns.

Puritans had no theological objections to sports and games as long as they did not involve gambling (which eliminated activities such as billiards, shuffleboard, horse racing, bowling, and cards). They also opposed blood sports, such as cockfighting, cudgel-fighting, and bear-baiting. Team sports, such as football, were problematic because "they encouraged idleness, produced injuries, and created bitter rivalries." Hunting and fishing were approved because they were productive. Other sports were encouraged for promoting civic virtue, such as competitions of marksmanship, running, and wrestling held within militia companies.

Only a few activities were completely condemned by Puritans. They were most opposed to the theater. According to historian Bruce Daniels, plays were seen as "false recreations because they exhausted rather than relaxed the audience and actors" and also "wasted labor, led to wantonness and homosexuality, and invariably were represented by Puritans as a foreign—particularly French or Italian—disease of a similar enervating nature as syphilis." All forms of gambling were illegal. Not only were card-playing, dice throwing and other forms of gambling seen as contrary to the values of "family, work, and honesty", they were religiously offensive because gamblers implicitly asked God to intervene in trivial matters, violating the Third Commandment against taking the Lord's name in vain.

=== Slavery ===
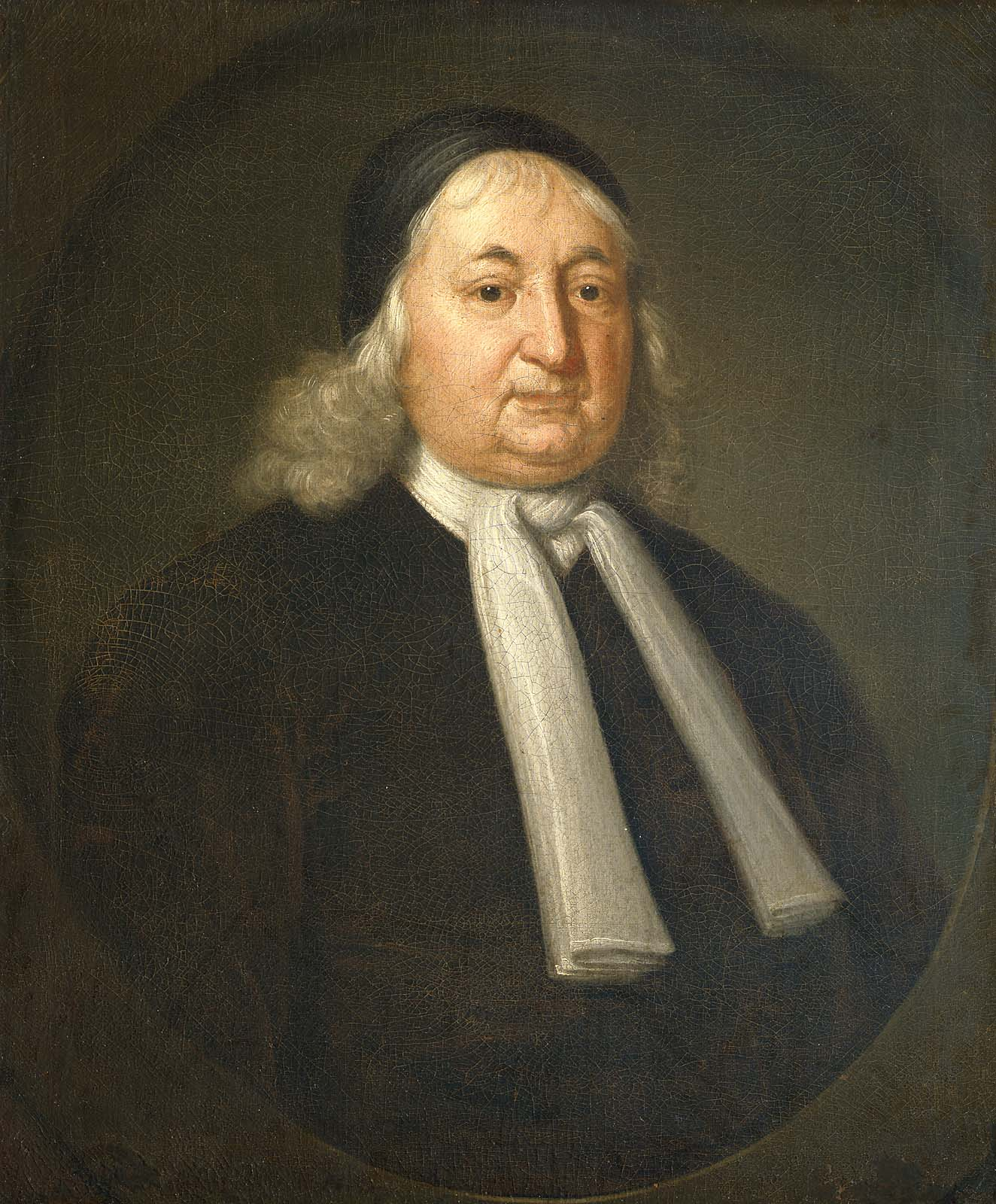
Samuel Sewall

Slavery was legal in colonial New England; however, the slave population was less than three percent of the labor force. Most Puritan clergy accepted the existence of slavery since it was a practice recognized in the Bible. They also acknowledged that all people—whether white, black or Native American—were persons with souls who might receive saving grace. For this reason, slaves and free black people were eligible for full church membership, though meetinghouses and burial grounds were racially segregated. The Puritan influence over society meant that slaves were treated better in New England than in the Southern Colonies. In Massachusetts, the law gave slaves "all the liberties and Christian usages which the law of God established in Israel doth morally require". As a result, slaves received the same protections against mistreatment as white servants. Slave marriages were legally recognized, and slaves were entitled to a trial by jury, even if accused of a crime by their master.

In 1700, Massachusetts judge and Puritan Samuel Sewall published "The Selling of Joseph," the first antislavery tract written in America. In it, Sewall condemns slavery and the slave trade and refutes many of the era's typical justifications for slavery.

The Puritan influence on slavery was still strong at the time of the American Revolution and beyond. In the decades leading up to the American Civil War, abolitionists such as Theodore Parker, Ralph Waldo Emerson, Henry David Thoreau and Frederick Douglass repeatedly used the Puritan heritage of the country to bolster their cause. The most radical anti-slavery newspaper, The Liberator, invoked the Puritans and Puritan values over a thousand times. Parker, in urging New England Congressmen to support the abolition of slavery, writes "The son of the Puritan ... is sent to Congress to stand up for Truth and Right ..."

== Controversies ==
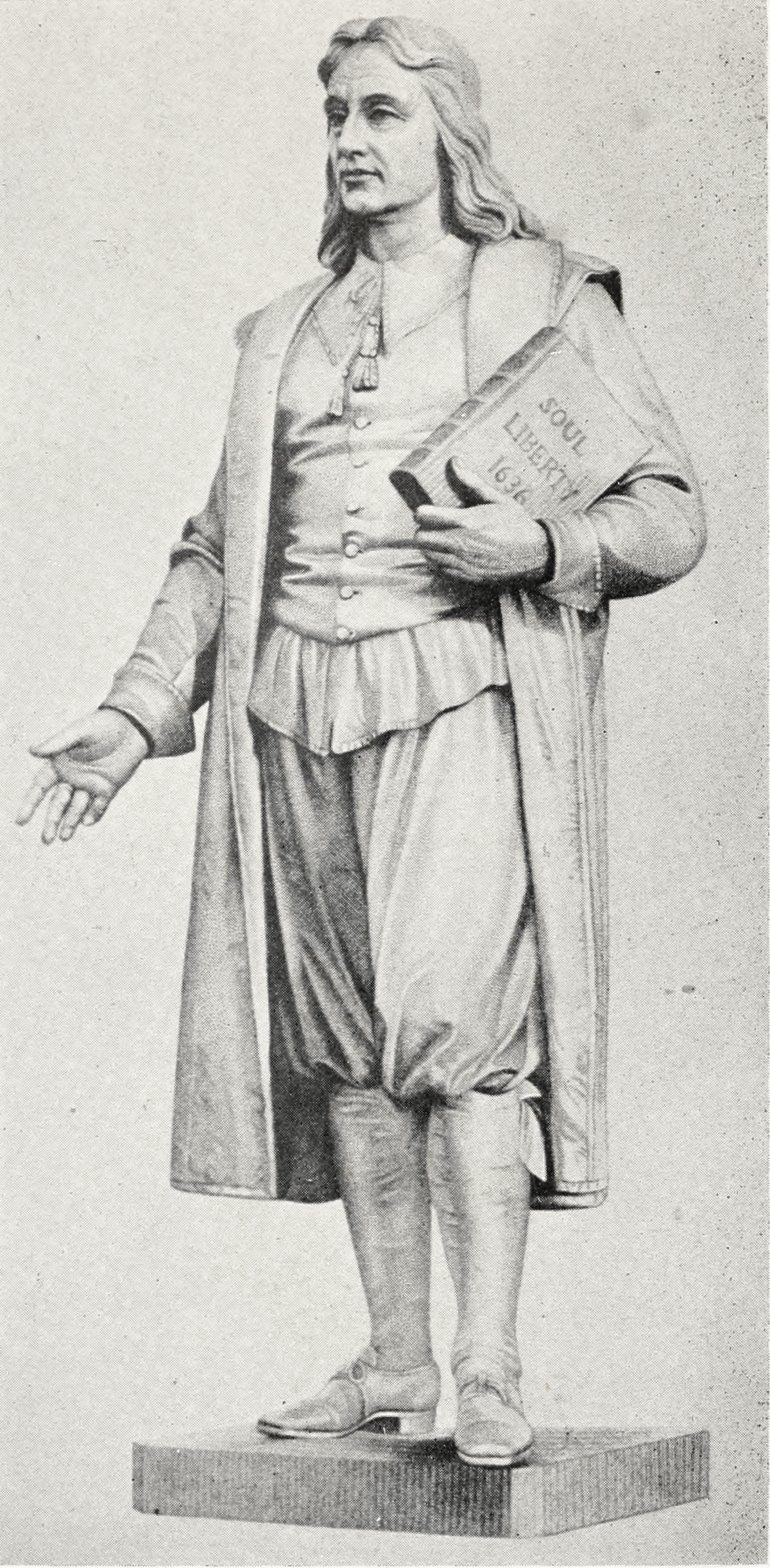
Engraving of a statue of Roger Williams (1603-1683), Puritan minister who was expelled from the Massachusetts Bay Colony in 1636 for his views and who advocated religious liberty. Williams founded the city of Providence, Rhode Island.

=== Roger Williams ===
Roger Williams, a Separating Puritan minister, arrived in Boston in 1631. He was immediately invited to become the teacher at the Boston church, but he refused the invitation on the grounds that the congregation had not separated from the Church of England. He then was invited to become the teacher of the church at Salem but was blocked by Boston political leaders, who objected to his separatism. He thus spent two years with his fellow Separatists in the Plymouth Colony but ultimately came into conflict with them and returned to Salem, where he became the unofficial assistant pastor to Samuel Skelton.

Williams held many controversial views that irritated the colony's political and religious leaders. He criticized the Puritan clergy's practice of meeting regularly for consultation, seeing in this a drift toward Presbyterianism. Williams' concern for the purity of the church led him to oppose the mixing of the elect and the unregenerate for worship and prayer, even when the unregenerate were family members of the elect. He also believed that Massachusetts rightfully belonged to the Native Americans and that the king had no authority to give it to the Puritans. Because he feared that government interference in religion would corrupt the church, Williams rejected the government's authority to punish violations of the first four Ten Commandments and believed that magistrates should not tender oaths to unconverted persons, which would have effectively abolished civil oaths.

In 1634 Skelton died, and the Salem congregation called Williams to be its pastor. In July 1635, however, he was brought before the General Court to answer for his views on oaths. Williams refused to back down, and the General Court warned Salem not to install him in any official position. In response, Williams decided that he could not maintain communion with the other churches in the colony nor with the Salem church unless they joined him in severing ties with the other churches. Caught between Williams and the General Court, the Salem congregation rejected Williams' extreme views.

In October, Williams was once again called before the General Court and refused to change his opinions. Williams was ordered to leave the colony and given until spring to do so, provided he ceased spreading his views. Unwilling to do so, the government issued orders for his immediate return to England in January 1636, but John Winthrop warned Williams, allowing him to escape. In 1636, the exiled Williams founded the colony of Providence Plantation. He was one of the first Puritans to advocate separation of church and state, and Providence Plantation was one of the first places in the Christian world to recognize freedom of religion.

=== Antinomian Controversy ===
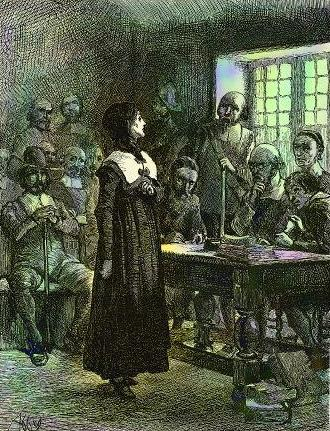
Anne Hutchinson on Trial (1901) by Edwin Austin Abbey

Anne Hutchinson and her family moved from Boston, Lincolnshire, to the Massachusetts Bay Colony in 1634, following their Puritan minister John Cotton. Cotton became the teacher of the Boston church, working alongside its pastor John Wilson, and Hutchinson joined the congregation. In 1635, Hutchinson began holding meetings in her home to summarize the previous week's sermons for women who had been absent. Such gatherings were not unusual.

In October 1635, Wilson returned from a trip to England, and his preaching began to concern Hutchinson. Like most of the clergy in Massachusetts, Wilson taught preparationism, the belief that human actions were "a means of preparation for God's grant of saving grace and ... evidence of sanctification." Cotton's preaching, however, emphasized the inevitability of God's will rather than human preparatory action. These two positions were a matter of emphases, as neither Cotton nor Wilson believed that good works could save a person. For Hutchinson, however, the difference was significant, and she began to criticize Wilson in her private meetings.

In the summer of 1636, Hutchinson's meetings were attracting powerful men such as William Aspinwall, William Coddington, John Coggeshall, and the colony's governor, Henry Vane. The group's credibility was increased by the perceived support of Cotton and the definite support of Hutchinson's brother-in-law, the minister John Wheelwright. By this time, Hutchinson was criticizing all the ministers in the colony, with the exception of Cotton and Wheelwright, for teaching legalism and preaching a "covenant of works" rather than a "covenant of grace". While denouncing the Puritan clergy as Arminians, Hutchinson maintained "that assurance of salvation was conveyed not by action but by an essentially mystical experience of grace—an inward conviction of the coming of the Spirit to the individual that bore no relationship to moral conduct." By rejecting adherence to the moral law, Hutchinson was teaching antinomianism, according to her clerical opponents.

Tensions continued to increase in the Boston church between Wilson and Hutchinson's followers, who formed a majority of the members. In January 1637, they were nearly successful in censuring him, and in the months that followed they left the meeting house whenever Wilson began to preach. The General Court ordered a day of fasting and prayer to help calm tensions, but Wheelwright preached a sermon on that day that further inflamed tensions, for which he was found guilty of sedition. Because Governor Vane was one of Hutchinson's followers, the general election of 1637 became a battlefront in the controversy, and Winthrop was elected to replace Vane.

A synod of New England clergy was held in August 1637. The ministers defined 82 errors attributed to Hutchinson and her followers. It also discouraged private religious meetings and criticizing the clergy. In November, Wheelwright was banished from the colony. Hutchinson was called before the General Court where she ably defended herself. Nevertheless, she was ultimately convicted and sentenced to banishment from the colony for her claims of receiving direct personal revelations from God. Other supporters were disenfranchised or forbidden from bearing arms unless they admitted their errors. Hutchinson received a church trial in March 1638 in which the Boston congregation switched sides and unanimously voted for Hutchinson's excommunication. This effectively ended the controversy.

While often described as a struggle for religious liberty, historian Francis Bremer states that this is a misunderstanding. Bremer writes, "Anne Hutchinson was every bit as intolerant as her enemies. The struggle was over which of two competing views would be crowned and enforced as New England orthodoxy. As a consequence of the crisis she precipitated, the range of views that were tolerated in the Bay actually narrowed."

In the aftermath of the crisis, ministers realized the need for greater communication between churches and the standardization of preaching. As a consequence, nonbinding ministerial conferences to discuss theological questions and address conflicts became more frequent in the following years. A more substantial innovation was the implementation of the "third way of communion", a method of isolating a dissident or heretical church from neighboring churches. Members of an offending church would be unable to worship or receive the Lord's Supper in other churches.

=== Witchcraft in Colonial America ===
Puritan fears, beliefs, and institutions fueled the witch craze in towns such as Salem from an interdisciplinary and anthropological approach. From a gendered approach, offered by Carol Karlsen and Elizabeth Reis, the question of why witches were primarily women did not fully surface until after the second wave of feminism in the 1980s. Some believe that women who were gaining economic or social power, specifically in the form of land inheritance, were at a higher risk of being tried as witches. Others maintain that females were more susceptible to being witches as the Puritans believed that the weak body was a pathway to the soul which both God and the Devil fought for. Because Puritans believed that female bodies "lacked the strength and vitality" compared to male bodies, females were more susceptible to make a choice to enter a covenant with Satan as their fragile bodies could not protect their souls.

From a racial perspective, Puritans believed that African Americans and Native Americans living within the colonies were viewed as "true witches" from an anthropological sense as Blacks were considered "inherently evil creatures, unable to control their connection to Satanic wickedness." Another contribution made to scholarship includes the religious perspective that historians attempt to understand its effect on the witch trials. J.P. Demos, a major scholar in the field of Puritan witchcraft studies, maintains that the intense and oppressive nature of Puritan religion can be viewed as the main culprit in the Colonial witch trials.

== Decline of power and influence ==
The decline of the Puritans and the Congregational churches was brought about first through practices such as the Half-Way Covenant and second through the rise of dissenting Baptists, Quakers, Anglicans and Presbyterians in the late 17th and early 18th centuries. There is no consensus on when the Puritan era ended, though it is agreed that it was over by 1740. By this time, the Puritan tradition was splintering into different strands of pietists, rationalists, and conservatives. Historian Thomas S. Kidd argues that after 1689 and the success of the Glorious Revolution, "[New Englanders'] religious and political agenda had so fundamentally changed that it doesn't make sense to call them Puritans any longer."

Denominations that are directly descended from the Puritan churches of New England include the Congregationalist Churches, a branch of the wider Reformed tradition: the United Church of Christ, the National Association of Congregational Christian Churches, and the Conservative Congregational Christian Conference. Next in size and historical importance is the United Church of Christ, which is the historic continuation of the Congregational churches founded under the influence of New England Puritanism. The United Church of Christ also subsumed the third major Reformed group, the German Reformed, which (then known as the Evangelical and Reformed Church) merged with the Congregationalists in 1957.

Additionally, the 18th century saw many historically Puritan churches, especially but not exclusively in eastern Massachusetts, progressively drift from Calvinism to Arminianism, with its greater emphasis on human will and activity, and from trinitarianism to unitarianism; in the first quarter of the 19th century, these became embroiled in the "Unitarian controversy", resulting in the formation of the American Unitarian Association in 1825 and, eventually, in some 250 of New England's original parish churches formally taking the name Unitarian. Such renaming was not systematic, however, and churches founded by Puritans which became Unitarian Universalist include the First Parish Church in Plymouth founded in 1620, the First Church in Salem founded in 1629, the First Church in Boston and First Parish Church of Dorchester founded in 1630, and the First Parish in Hingham founded in 1681.

== See also ==
- Pine tree shilling
