= Established Congregationalism in New England =

Colonial New England's legally established religion

Congregational church establishment in New England
- 1630s–1833
Puritanism in England	Disestablishment in the U.S.
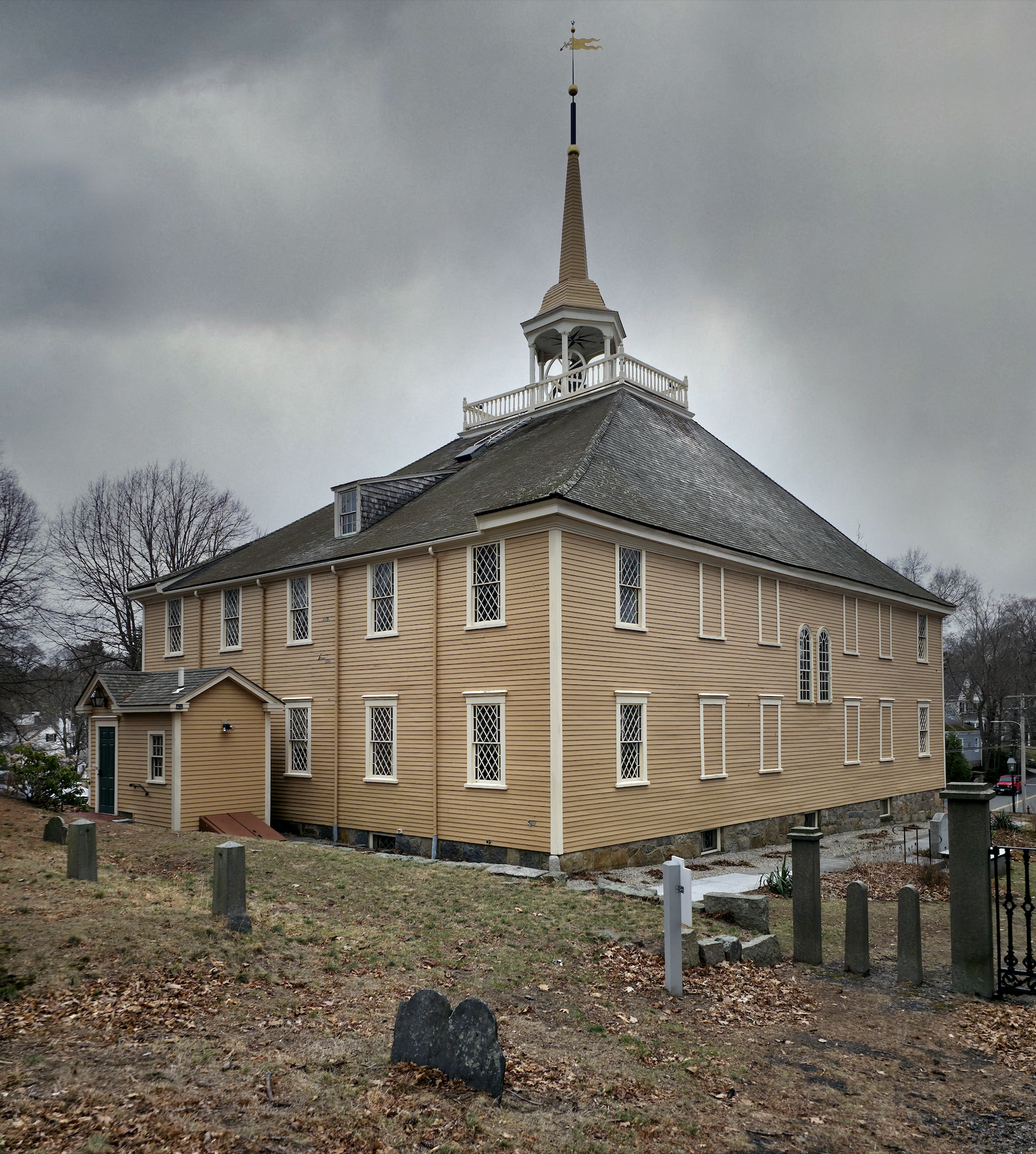
- The Old Ship Church (1681), a Congregational meetinghouse in Hingham, Massachusetts
- Duration: ~200 years
- Location: New England, Colonial Thirteen Colonies
- Including: Massachusetts, Connecticut, New Hampshire
- Monarch: Charles I of England (early establishment period)
- Leader(s): John Winthrop, Thomas Hooker (early colonial founders)
- Key events: Massachusetts Constitution of 1780, Connecticut Constitution of 1818, New Hampshire Constitution#1784

Congregational church establishment in New England refers to the system of legally established Congregationalism in several of the New England Colonies during the seventeenth and eighteenth centuries.

Once in New England, the Puritans established Congregational churches that subscribed to Reformed theology. The Savoy Declaration, a modification of the Westminster Confession, was adopted as a confessional statement by the churches in Massachusetts in 1680 and the churches of Connecticut in 1708.

In the Massachusetts Bay Colony, Congregational churches were supported by public taxation beginning in the 1630s initially with only male members of the church being able to vote, and the church continued to receive state support. However from the start there was some acceptance that freedom of conscience was scriptural as there was in Plymouth Colony. The Cambridge Platform, drafted at the request of the Massachusetts General Court during the Interregnum, sought to combine Congregationalist polity with the framework of a legally established church.

In Connecticut Colony founded by Thomas Hooker, the Congregational Church retained official tax-supported status until after the Revolution. New Hampshire also supported Protestant churches, primarily Congregational, through public taxes. Rhode Island was the notable exception in New England, as its 1663 charter guaranteed freedom of conscience and rejected any established church. The then Congregationalist Roger Williams in 1636 set up Providence Plantations (that later became Rhode Island) with a formal separation of church and state.

The disestablishment of Congregational churches in New England occurred gradually between the late eighteenth and early nineteenth centuries, reflecting the region’s shifting political and religious landscape after the American Revolution. Connecticut adopted a new constitution in 1818 that ended state support for the church, while New Hampshire formally abolished religious taxation in 1819. Massachusetts retained its religious establishment longest, but growing pressure from dissenters and changing notions of individual liberty led to the constitutional amendment of 1833, which finally severed ties between church and state. This process was shaped by the influence of Enlightenment ideals, the rise of religious pluralism, and debates over the meaning of religious freedom in the new republic.

== See also ==
- Separation of church and state in the United States
- Great Awakening
- Half-Way Covenant
- Religion in the Thirteen Colonies
- Antinomian Controversy
- History of Harvard University
- Obadiah Holmes
- History of the Quakers

== Bibliography ==
- Bremer, Francis J. (2009). Puritanism: A very short introduction. Oxford University Press. ISBN 978-0-19-974087-1.
- Cooper, James F. Jr. (1999). Tenacious of Their Liberties: The Congregationalists in colonial Massachusetts. Religion in America. New York, NY: Oxford University Press. ISBN 0-19-515287-5.
- Dunning, Albert E. (1894). Congregationalists in America: A Popular History of Their Origin, Belief, Polity, Growth and Work. New York: J. A. Hill & Co.
- Olmstead, Clifton E. (1960). History of Religion in the United States. Englewood Cliffs, New Jersey: Prentice-Hall.
- Walker, W. (1894). A History of the Congregational Churches in the United States. American Church History. Vol. 3. New York, NY: The Christian Literature Company. ISBN 978-0-7905-4239-3.
- Youngs, J. William T. (1998). The Congregationalists. Denominations in America. Vol. 4 (Student ed.). Westport, CT: Praeger. ISBN 978-0-275-96441-2.
