= Saybrook Platform =

Constitution of Connecticut Congregational churches

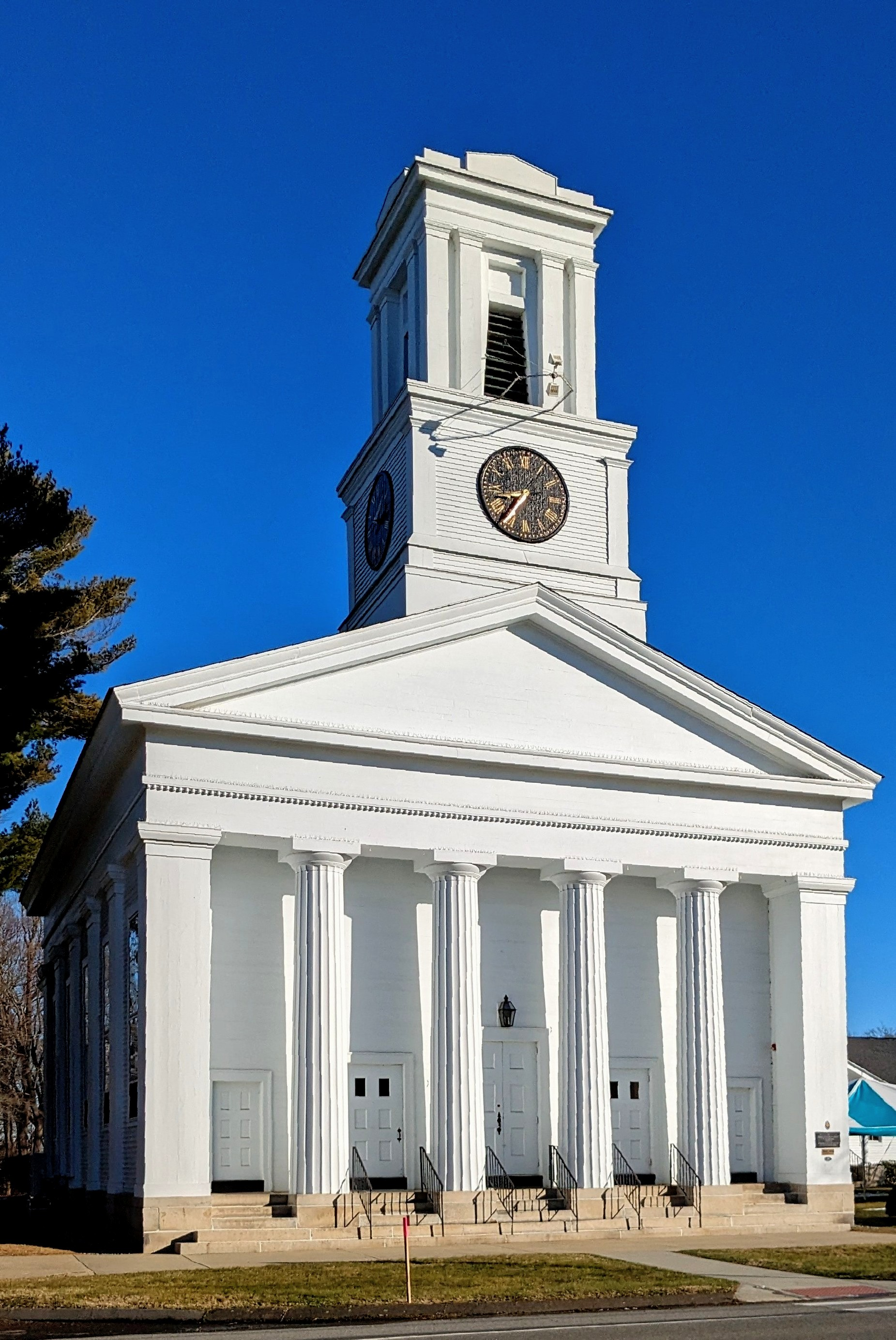
First Church of Christ, Saybrook. (built 1840)

The Saybrook Platform was a constitution for the Congregational church in Connecticut in the 18th century.

== Historical context ==
Religious and civic leaders in Connecticut around 1700 were distressed by the colony-wide decline in personal religious piety and in church discipline. The colonial legislature took action by calling 12 ministers and four laymen to meet in Saybrook, Connecticut; eight were Yale trustees. Delegates were involved in the polity debates between Presbyterianism on the one hand, Congregationalism on the other, and the mediating position of Consociationalism.

== Content ==
The Platform consists of three parts: a confession, the Heads of Agreement, and the Fifteen Articles.

=== Confession ===
In reference to doctrine, the assembly adopted the Savoy Declaration as amended by the Boston Synod of 1680. This put the Connecticut church in line with the Westminster tradition and the Massachusetts church.

The Savoy originally appended its own platform on polity to the confession, but this was not adopted in either Boston or Saybrook, which instead used the Cambridge Platform and Saybrook Platform respectively.

=== Heads of Agreement ===
In reference to church order and unity, the assembly adopted the Heads of Agreement, a document effecting a union between Congregationalists and Presbyterians of (old) London. This document was previously circulated among American churches, but was not chosen to unify Presbyterians and Congregationalists in Connecticut, as there were no Presbyterian delegates. The Heads of Agreement were drafted by Increase Mather, Matthew Mead and John Hone.

The Heads of Agreement are considered the most liberal part of the platform, and challenging to enforce, hence the need for the following articles.

=== Fifteen Articles ===
In reference to church government and discipline, the assembly produced their own Articles for the administration of church discipline.

They (the articles) are in reality the Platform, for all that goes before them is but a reaffirmation of principles already accepted, and the new thing in the document, the advance in ecclesiasticism, is the increased authority permitted and, later, enforced by these Fifteen Articles.

The articles prescribe consociations to litigate church discipline issues, associations of ministers to meet concerning the interest of churches and to examine ministerial candidates, and a general association of delegates to meet annually. There was to be at least one association and consociation per county.

== Reception ==
The Saybrook Platform brought a more centralized church system than existed prior to 1708, similar to but not completely Presbyterian. The Congregational church was now to be led by local ministerial associations and consociations composed of ministers and lay leaders from a specific geographical area. A colony-wide General Assembly held final authority. Instead of the congregation from each local church selecting its minister, the associations now had the responsibility to examine candidates for the ministry, and to oversee behavior of the ministers. The consociations (where laymen were powerless) could impose discipline on specific churches and judge disputes that arose. Associations were equipped to disfellowship non-compliant churches. Similar proposals for more centralized clerical control of local churches were defeated in Massachusetts, where a more liberal theology flourished. The Platform facilitated close ties with the Presbyterians; Connecticut Yankees who moved West founded Presbyterian churches. The Platform was a conservative victory against a non-conformist tide which had begun with the Halfway Covenant and would culminate in the Great Awakening.

As the established church, the terms of the Saybrook Platform were legally enforceable against dissenting Christians, such as Connecticut Baptist Isaac Backus. Following the Great Awakening, Connecticut Old and New Lights underwent a "great schism." Connecticut's ecclesiastical laws were finally amended in 1750.

== See also ==
- Cambridge Platform
- Plan of Union of 1801

== Primary sources ==
- H. Shelton Smith, Robert T Handy and Lefferts A Loetscher, eds. American Christianity: An Historical Interpretation With Representative Documents, Vol. 1: 1607-1820 (1960) pp 226–29 has the text
- The Ancient Platforms of the Congregational Churches of New-England. Middletown, E. Hunt, 1843.
- Heads of Agreement Assented to by the United Ministers in and about London: Formerly Called Presbyterian and Congregational. Howe, John., 1691.
