= Reforming Synod =

17th century church synod in Boston, Massachusetts

The confession of faith adopted by the Reforming Synod was translated into Angonquian.

The Reforming Synod, also called the Synod of Boston was a synod convened in Colonial New England for two sessions in 1679 and 1680. It was convened by the Massachusetts General Court in response to perceived spiritual decay, set to answer two questions: “What are the Evils that have provoked the Lord to bring his judgments on New England?", and, “What is to be done, that so these evils may be reformed?” Spiritual decline was in part attributed to the Half-Way Covenant and surrounding controversy.

== Proceedings ==
The synod adopted the Savoy recension of the Westminster Confession in 1680, formally re-titled A Confession of Faith Owned and Consented Unto by the Elders & Messengers of the Churches Assembled at Boston in New England, May 12 1680. Being the Second Session of that Synod. This confession was later to be translated to Algonquian.

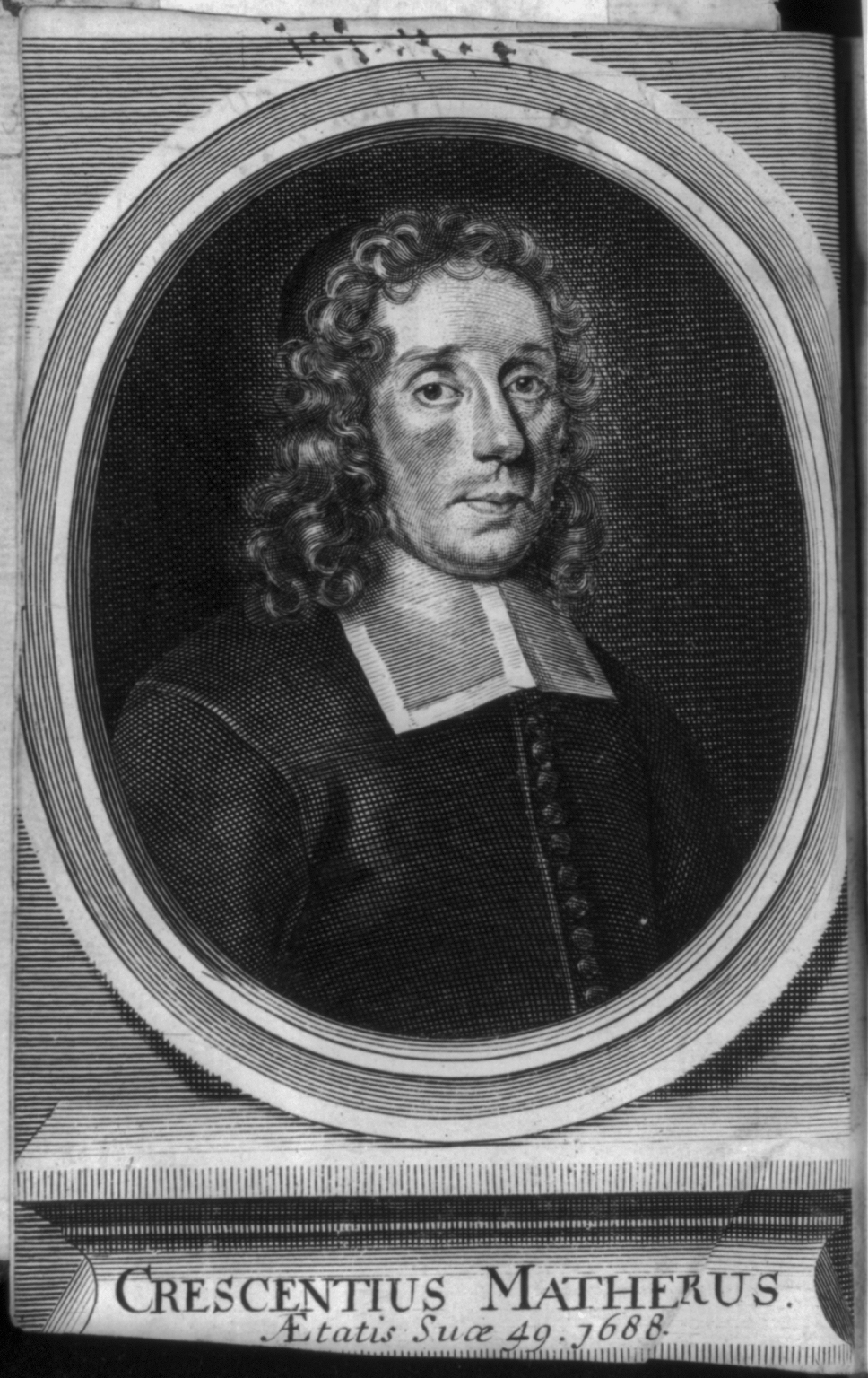
Increase Mather was a prominent Boston minister and key figure at the synod.

Solomon Stoddard's view of the Lord's Supper was called into question, and the synod included a debate between Stoddard and Increase Mather.

=== Causes of Judgment ===
Answering the question, "What are the Evils ...?", the synod identified several potential causes:

- decay in secret worship (i.e. private devotion)
- pride, manifesting in a refusal to be subject to order according to divine appointment, like Korah, and in contention
- neglecting fellowship
- lack of discipline extended to children of the covenant
- improper worship

A cause of all these evils was determined to be "defects as to Family Government”

=== Reforming ===
Answering "What is to be done, that so these evils may be reformed?", the synod advised the following:

- those concerned with reform should set an example
- individuals and churches should renew their commitment to faith, according to scripture as expressed in the platform
- discipline should be practiced regarding admittance to the table
  - communicants should “be not admitted unto Communion in the Lord’s Supper without making a personal and publick profession of their Faith and Repentance”
- discipline of Christ should be upheld in the churches
- every church should full have a "full supply of officers, according to Christ’s Institution"
  - the particular view of church offices, following the Cambridge platform, was four: pastor, teacher, ruling elder and deacon.
- every law passed should have biblical warrant (see theonomy)
