= Half-Way Covenant =

Historical form of church membership in American Christianity

The Half-Way Covenant was a form of partial church membership adopted by the Congregational churches of colonial New England in the 1660s. The Puritan-controlled Congregational churches required evidence of a personal conversion experience before granting church membership and the right to have one's children baptized. Conversion experiences were less common among second-generation colonists, and this became an issue when these unconverted adults had children of their own who were ineligible for baptism.

The Half-Way Covenant was proposed as a solution to this problem. It allowed baptized but unconverted parents to present their own children for baptism; however, they were denied the other privileges of church membership. The Half-Way Covenant was endorsed by an assembly of ministers in 1657 and a church synod in 1662. Nevertheless, it was highly controversial among Congregationalists with many conservatives being afraid it would lead to lower standards within the church. A number of Congregational churches split over the issue.

The Half-Way Covenant's adoption has been interpreted by some historians as signaling the decline of New England Puritanism and the ideal of the church as a body of exclusively converted believers. For other historians, it signaled a move away from sectarianism. The Half-Way Covenant also opened the door to further divisions among Congregationalists concerning the nature of the sacraments and the necessity of conversion. Liberal Congregational churches extended church membership to all professing Christians, and in time many of these churches became Unitarian. The revivalism unleashed by the First Great Awakening was in part a reaction against the Half-Way Covenant.

== Name ==
The term Halfway Covenant was a derogatory label applied by opponents of the practice. The term used by supporters at the time was "large Congregationalism".

== Background ==
Beginning in the 1620s and 1630s, colonial New England was settled by Puritans who believed that they were obligated to build a holy society in covenant with God. The covenant was the foundation for Puritan convictions concerning personal salvation, the church, social cohesion and political authority. The first colonists organized themselves into Congregational churches by means of church covenants. According to the Puritan vision, every church member should be a "visible saint", someone who not only demonstrated an understanding of Christian doctrine and was free of social scandal but who also could claim a conscious conversion experience. This experience indicated to Puritans that a person had been regenerated and was, therefore, one of the elect destined for salvation. To ensure only regenerated persons entered the church, prospective members were required to provide their personal conversion narratives to be judged by the congregation. If accepted, they could affirm the church covenant and receive the privileges of membership, which included participating in the Lord's Supper and having their children baptized.

The sharing of conversion narratives prior to admission was first practiced at the First Church in Boston in 1634 during a religious revival in which an unusually large number of converts joined the church. Before being admitted into the church, the converts engaged in a Puritan practice of lay sermonizing or prophesying in which they recounted to the congregation the process by which they became convinced of their election. This practice spread to other churches and by 1640 had become a requirement throughout New England. With this new rule, the Puritans believed they had come closer to making the visible church a more accurate reflection of the invisible church.

As Calvinists, Congregationalists did not believe the sacraments had any power to produce conversion or determine one's spiritual state. The sacraments were seals of the covenant meant to confirm one in their election, which was already predestined by God. While children could not be presumed to be regenerated, it was believed that children of church members were already included in the church covenant on the basis of their parent's membership and had the right to receive the initial sacrament of baptism. When these baptized children became adults, it was expected that they too would experience conversion and be admitted into full communion with the right to participate in the Lord's Supper.

By the 1650s and 1660s, the baptized children of this first generation had become adults themselves and were beginning to have children; however, many within this second generation had not experienced conversion. As a result, their children were denied infant baptism and entry into the covenant. As this group increased, Congregationalists grew concerned that the church's influence over society would weaken unless these unconverted adults and their children were kept in the church. It seemed that the Puritan ideal of a pure church of authentic converts was clashing with the equally important ideal of a society united in covenant with God.

== Proposal ==
As early as 1634, the church in Dorchester, Massachusetts, asked the advice of Boston's First Church concerning a church member's desire to have his grandchild baptized even though neither of his parents were full members. First Church recommended that this be allowed. The issue was brought up on other occasions from time to time. Thomas Hooker, founder of Connecticut, and John Davenport, a prominent minister and founder of New Haven Colony, believed that only children of full members should be baptized. George Phillips of Watertown, Massachusetts, however, believed that all descendants of converts belonged within the church.

In the 1640s, a protest movement led by Robert Child over complaints that children were being "debarred from the seals of the covenant" led to the Cambridge Synod of 1646, which created the Cambridge Platform outlining Congregational church discipline. Initially, the Platform included language declaring that baptism was open to all descendants of converted church members who "cast not off the covenant of God by some scandalous and obstinate going on in sin". Nevertheless, this statement was not included in the final version of the Platform due to the opposition of important figures, such as Charles Chauncy who would later become president of Harvard College. Samuel Stone and John Cotton supported the more inclusive view.

In 1650, Samuel Stone of Hartford, Connecticut, called for a synod to settle the issue, and he warned that if this did not occur the Connecticut churches would proceed to implement halfway covenant principles. Between 1654 and 1656, the churches at Salem, Dorchester and Ipswich adopted the halfway system.

The provisions of the Half-Way Covenant were outlined and endorsed by a meeting of ministers initiated by the legislatures of Connecticut and Massachusetts. This ministerial assembly met in Boston on June 4, 1657. Plymouth Colony sent no delegates, and New Haven declined to take part, insisting on adhering to the older practice. The assembly recommended that the children of unconverted baptized adults receive baptism if their parents publicly agreed with Christian doctrine and affirmed the church covenant in a ceremony known as "owning the baptismal covenant" in which "they give up themselves and their children to the Lord, and subject themselves to the Government of Christ in the Church". These baptized but unconverted members were not to be admitted to the Lord's Supper or vote on church business (such as choosing ministers or disciplining other members) until they had professed conversion.

These recommendations were controversial and met with strong opposition, inducing the Massachusetts General Court to call a synod of ministers and lay delegates to deliberate further on the question of who should be baptized. Like the 1657 assembly, the Synod of 1662 endorsed the Half-Way Covenant. Among the 70 members of the synod, the strongest advocate for the Half-Way Covenant was Jonathan Mitchell, pastor of Cambridge's First Parish, and the leader of the conservative party, President Chauncey.

Under congregationalist polity, the decision to accept or reject the Half-Way Covenant belonged to each congregation. Some churches rejected it and maintained the original standard into the 1700s. Other churches went beyond the Half-Way Covenant, opening baptism to all infants whether or not their parents or grandparents had been baptized.

== Adoption ==
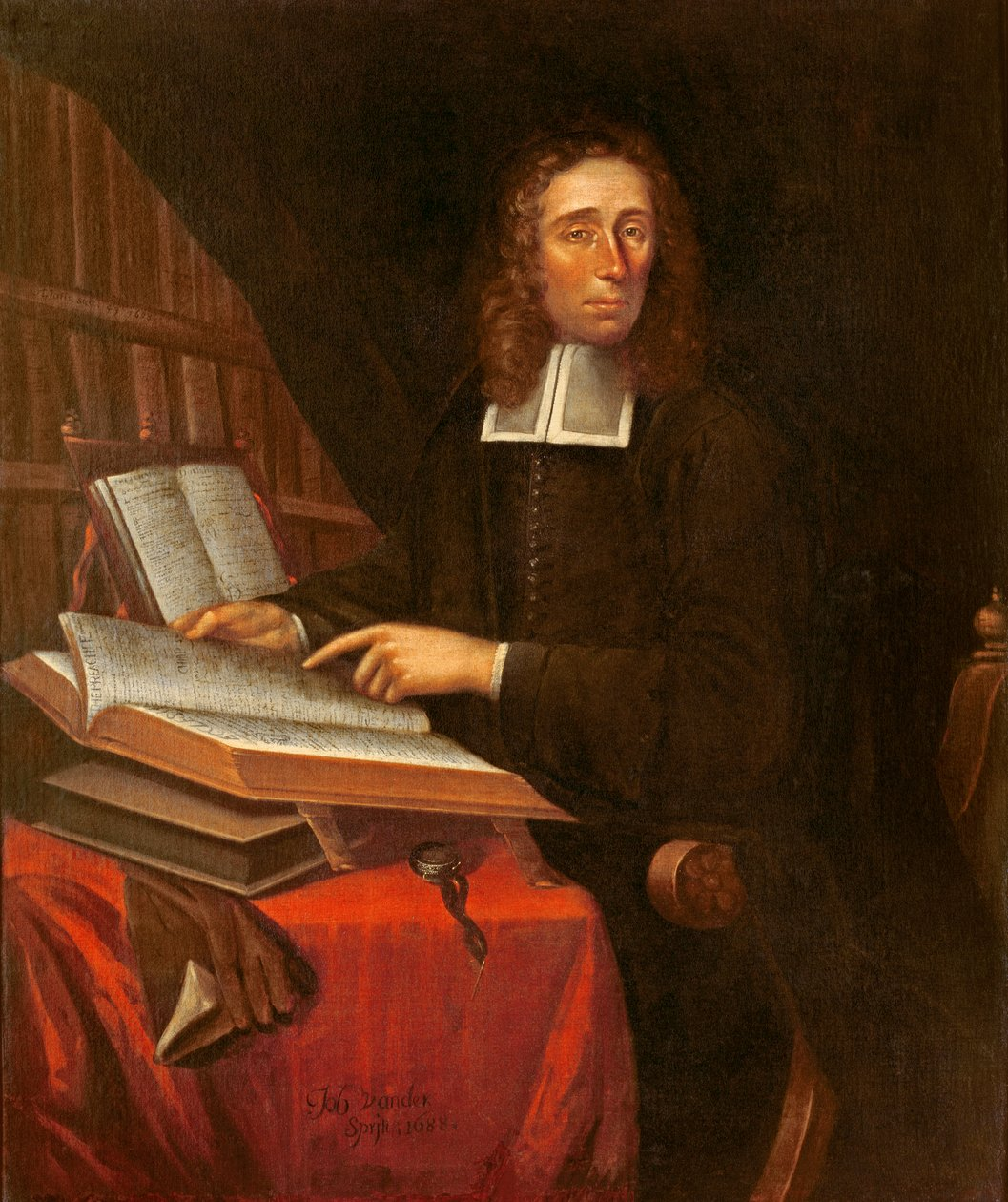
Increase Mather, who initially opposed the Half-Way Covenant but was persuaded to support it

While the conservatives were outvoted in the synod, they continued to publicly protest, and both sides engaged in a pamphlet war. Chauncey, Davenport and Increase Mather wrote against the synod, while Mitchell, John Allen and Richard Mather defended it. Eventually, Increase Mather changed his position and supported the Half-Way Covenant.

Critics argued that the Half-Way Covenant would end commitment to the Puritan ideal of a regenerate church membership, either by permanently dividing members into two classes (those with access to the Lord's Supper and those with only baptism) or by starting the slippery slope to giving the unconverted access to the Lord's Supper. Supporters argued that to deny baptism and inclusion in the covenant to the grandchildren of first generation members was in essence claiming that second-generation parents had forfeited their membership and "discovenanted themselves", despite for the most part being catechized churchgoers. Supporters believed the Half-Way Covenant was a "middle way" between the extremes of either admitting the ungodly into the church or stripping unconverted adults of their membership in the baptismal covenant. At least in this way, they argued, a larger number of people would be subject to the church's discipline and authority.

By the 1660s, churches in Connecticut were divided between those who utilized the Half-Way Covenant, those who completely rejected it and those who allowed anyone to be a full member. With the colony's clergy divided over the issue, the Connecticut legislature decided in 1669 that it would tolerate both inclusive and exclusive baptism practices. It also permitted churches divided over the issue to split. Several churches split over the Half-Way Covenant's adoption, including churches at Hartford, Windsor and Stratford. One minister, Abraham Pierson of Branford, led his congregation to New Jersey to escape its influence.

The churches of Massachusetts were slower to accept inclusive baptism policies. Lay church members were divided with some supporting the new measures and others strongly opposing. The result was schism as congregations divided over implementing the synod's recommendations. A prominent example was the division of Boston's First Church after the death of its pastor John Wilson, a Half-Way supporter, in 1667. Davenport was called by the congregation as its new pastor, and this was followed by the withdrawal of 28 disgruntled members who formed Third Church (better known as Old South Church). For 14 years, there was no communion between the two churches, and the conflict affected the rest of Massachusetts' Congregational churches. Those who were against the Half-Way Covenant favored First Church and those who approved favored Third Church.

Until 1676, opponents of the Half-Way Covenant in Massachusetts were successful at preventing its adoption in all major churches. That year marked the beginning of a long series of crises in Massachusetts, beginning with King Phillip's War (1675–1678) and ending with the Salem Witch Trials (1693). Many Puritans believed God was punishing the colony for failing to bring more people into the covenant. The Massachusetts General Court called the Reforming Synod (1679–1680) to consider the causes for decline. By the end of the 17th century, four out of every five Congregational churches in Massachusetts had adopted the Half-Way Covenant, with some also extending access to the Lord's Supper.

As the Half-Way Covenant became widely adopted, it became typical for a New England congregation to have a group of regular churchgoers who were considered Christians by their behavior but who never professed conversion. Often, these half-way members outnumbered full members. One Massachusetts estimate from 1708 stated the ratio was four half-way members to each full member.

== Abandonment ==
The Half-Way Covenant continued to be practiced by three-fourths of New England's churches into the 1700s, but opposition continued from those wanting a return to the strict admission standards as well as those who wanted the removal of all barriers to church membership. Northampton pastor Solomon Stoddard (1643–1729) attacked both the Half-Way practice and the more exclusive admission policy, writing that the doctrine of local church covenants "is wholly unscriptural, [it] is the reason that many among us are shut out of the church, to whom church privileges do belong." Stoddard still believed that New England was a Christian nation and that it had a national covenant with God. The existence of such a covenant, however, required all citizens to partake of the Lord's Supper. Open communion was justified because Stoddard believed the sacrament was a "converting ordinance" that prepared people for conversion. Stoddardeanism was an attempt to reach people with the gospel more effectively, but it did so, according to historian Mark Noll, by "abandoning the covenant as a unifying rationale".

Historian Sydney E. Ahlstrom writes that during the First Great Awakening (1734–1745), "The ideal of a regenerate [church] membership was renewed, while Stoddardeanism and the Half-Way Covenant were called into question." Jonathan Edwards, Stoddard's grandson, was influential in undermining both Stoddardeanism and the Half-Way Covenant, but he also attacked the very idea of a national covenant. Edwards believed there was only one covenant between God and man—the covenant of grace. This covenant was an internal covenant, taking place in the heart. Infant baptism and the Lord's Supper were covenant privileges available only to "visible and professing saints". Opponents of the Awakening saw Edwards' views as a threat to family well-being and the social order, which they believed were promoted by the Half-Way system.

The Great Awakening left behind several religious factions in New England, and all of them had different views on the covenant. In this environment, the Half-Way system ceased to function as a source of religious and social cohesion. The New Light followers of Edwards would continue to insist that the church be a body of regenerate saints. The liberal, Arminian Congregationalists who dominated the churches in Boston and on the East Coast rejected the necessity of any specific conversion experience and would come to believe that the Lord's Supper was a memorial rather than a means of grace or a converting ordinance. As a result, they believed that distinguishing between full members and half-way members was "undemocratic, illiberal, and anachronistic". These liberal currents would eventually lead to beliefs in Unitarianism and universal salvation and the creation of a distinct American Unitarian denomination in the 19th century.

== Puritan declension theory ==
Nineteenth-century Congregationalist ministers Leonard Bacon and Henry Martyn Dexter saw the Half-Way Covenant's adoption as the beginning of the decline of New England's churches that continued into the 1800s. Some historians also identify the Half-Way Covenant with Puritan decline or declension. Historian Perry Miller identifies its adoption as the final step in "the transformation of Congregationalism from a religious Utopia to a legalized order" in which assurance of salvation became essentially a private matter and the "churches were pledged, in effect, not to pry into the genuineness of any religious emotions, but to be altogether satisfied with decorous semblances."

Historian Sydney Ahlstrom writes that the covenant was "itself no proof of declension" but that it "documented the passing of churches composed solely of regenerate 'saints'." Historian Francis Bremer writes that it weakened the unity of the Congregational churches and that the bitter fighting between ministers over its adoption led to a loss of respect for the Puritan clergy as a social class.

Historian Robert G. Pope questioned the "myth of declension", writing that the process labeled decline was, in reality, the "maturation" of the Congregational churches away from sectarianism. Pope and Edmund Morgan found that many church members were very scrupulous in Massachusetts. While second-generation colonists were having conversion experiences similar to those of their parents, the second generation often doubted the validity of their own experiences. Pope and Morgan theorize that it was scrupulosity rather than impiety that led to the decline in church membership.

Historian Mark Noll writes that by keeping the rising generation officially within the church the Half-Way Covenant actually preserved New England's Puritan society, while also maintaining conversion as the standard for full church membership. Due to its widespread adoption, most New Englanders continued to be included within the covenant bonds linking individuals, churches and society until the First Great Awakening definitively marked the end of the Puritan era.

== See also ==
- Covenant succession
