= Reformed baptismal theology =

Practice of baptism in Reformed theology

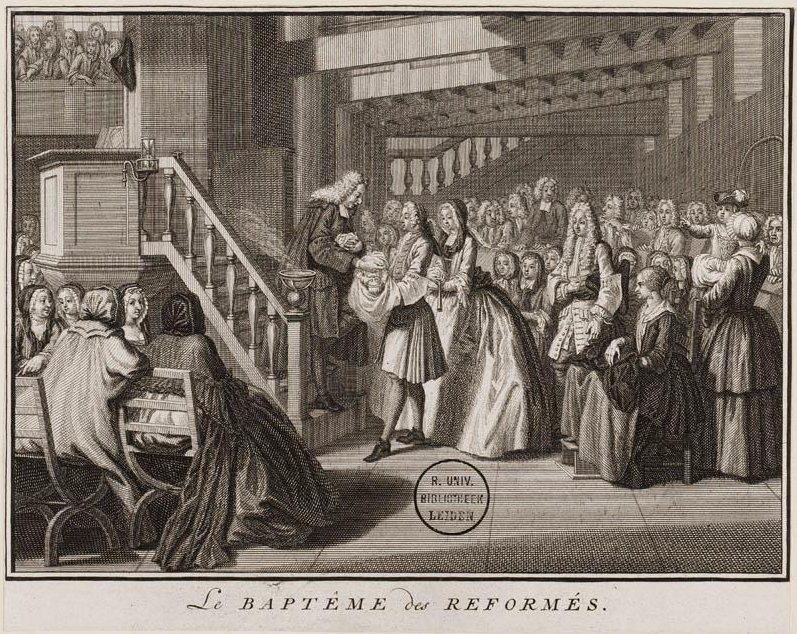
Engraving of a baptism in a Reformed church by Bernard Picart

In Reformed theology, baptism is a sacrament signifying the baptized person's union with Christ, or becoming part of Christ and being treated as if they had done everything Christ had. Sacraments, along with preaching of God's word, are means of grace through which God offers Christ to people. Sacraments are believed to have their effect through the Holy Spirit, but these effects are only believed to accrue to those who have faith in Christ.

Baptism is the sacrament of initiation into the visible church, or body of people who publicly claim faith in Christ. Baptism also signifies regeneration and remission of sin. Reformed Christians believe that the children of church members should be baptized. Because baptism is believed to be beneficial only to those who have faith in Christ, infants are baptized on the basis of the promise of faith which will come to fruition later in life.

== History ==
=== Background ===
Christian baptismal theology prior to the Reformation taught that sacraments, including baptism, are means or instruments through which God communicates grace to people. The sacrament was considered valid regardless of who administered it. Not everyone who received a sacrament, however, received the grace signified by the sacrament. Some medieval theologians spoke of an obstacle of mortal sin which blocks the grace of the sacrament, while others insisted that the recipient be positively open and responding in faith to the sacrament in order to receive any benefit. Baptism was believed to be used by the Holy Spirit to transform the believer, and offered the benefits of remission of sins, regeneration, and the indwelling of the Holy Spirit. The sacrament of penance was believed to be necessary for forgiveness for sins committed after baptism.

During the Reformation, Martin Luther rejected many of the Catholic Church's seven sacraments, but retained baptism and the Lord's Supper. He saw many practices of the medieval church as abuses of power intended to require work in order to merit forgiveness for sin after baptism rather than faith alone. Luther attached the promise of salvation to baptism, and taught that life after baptism should be spent in recollection of it and the dying to sin it signified.

=== Reformation and Reformed orthodoxy ===
Huldrych Zwingli, the earliest theologian considered part of the Reformed tradition, was vigorously opposed to worship practices he believed to be based on tradition rather than the Bible. Nevertheless, he disagreed with Anabaptists, who refused to baptize their children on scriptural grounds. Through his arguments with Anabaptists, Zwingli arrived at the position that baptism was a sign of the covenant between God and his people, but that it did not convey grace to the baptized. He saw baptism as essentially identical to the circumcision of Israelites in the Old Testament in this respect, and used this idea in polemics against Anabaptists. Zwingli's emphasis on baptism as a pledge or oath was to prove unique in the Reformed tradition. Heinrich Bullinger, Zwingli's successor, continued the teaching of the continuity of God's covenants and circumcision with baptism. Bullinger also emphasized that baptism indicates duties to the baptized in response to God's grace.

John Calvin was influenced by Martin Luther's idea of baptism as God's promises to the baptized person attached to the outward sign of washing with water. Calvin maintained Zwingli's idea of baptism as a public pledge, but insisted that it was secondary to baptism's meaning as a sign of God's promise to forgive sin. He maintained that sacraments were effective instruments in bringing about the promises they represent, however he also maintained that the promises could be refused by the baptized, and would have no effect in that case. Calvin carefully distinguished between the outward sign of the washing of water with the promises that baptism signifies while maintaining that they were inseparable. Calvin's baptismal theology is very similar to that of Luther. It differs in the way Calvin subordinated sacraments to the preaching of the word of God. While Luther placed preaching and sacraments on the same level, Calvin saw sacraments as confirmation which is added to the preaching of the word of God.

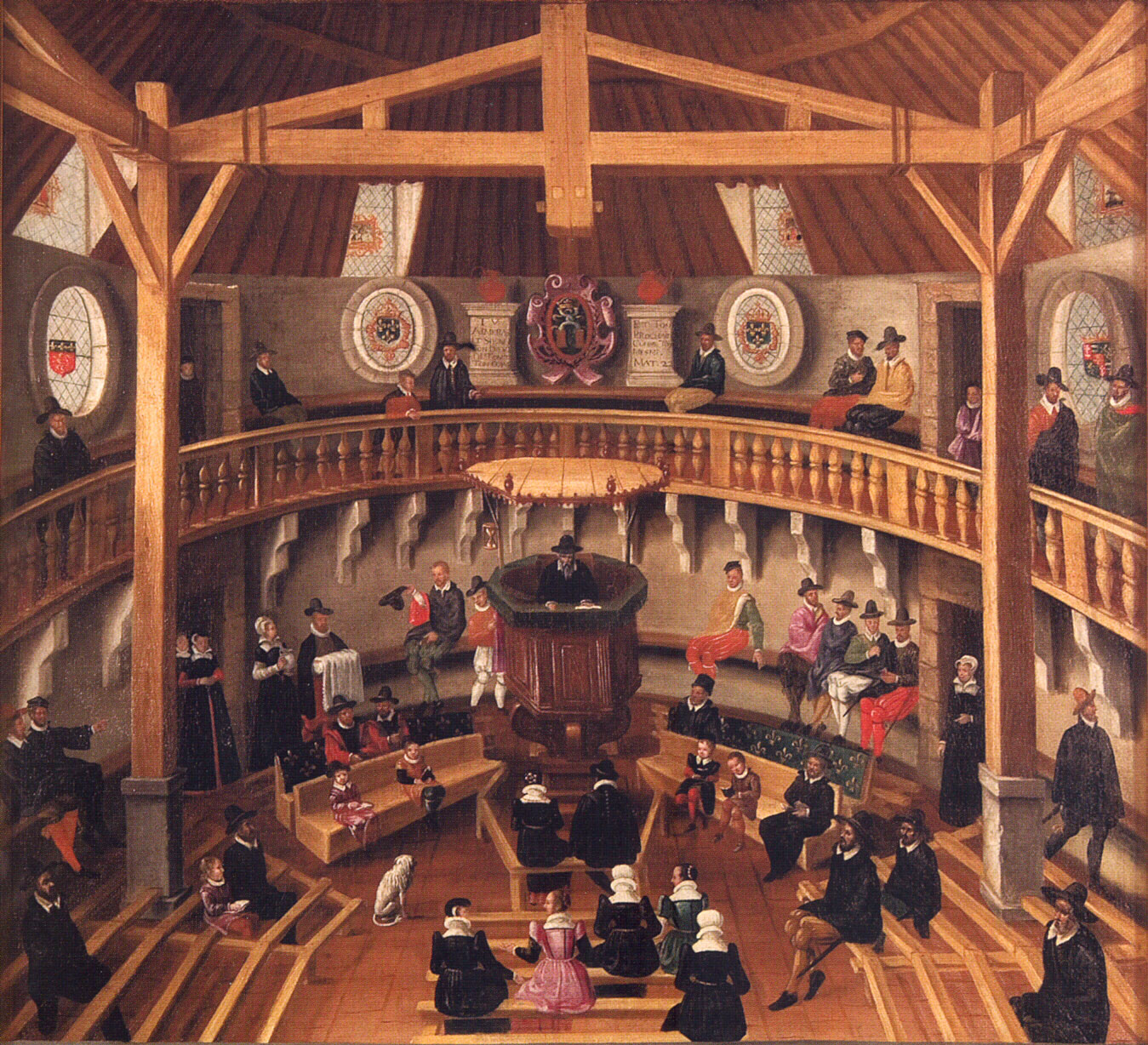
In this painting of the Huguenot Temple de Lyon, a woman stands next to the pulpit with a pitcher and a man with a towel in preparation for a baptism.

From the end of the sixteenth century through the eighteenth century, a period known as Reformed orthodoxy, Reformed baptismal theology further developed the covenantal meaning of baptism. Theologians more carefully defined the sacramental union of baptism, or the relationship between the outward washing with that which it signifies. In the high orthodox period (middle to late seventeenth century), theologians such as Hermann Witsius expanded the covenantal meaning of baptism using analogies such as Noah's Ark and the crossing of the Red Sea, which carried the theological themes of the resurrection and eternal life. This period also saw the emergence of Reformed Baptists. Reformed Baptist theologians had much in common with the Reformed, but saw baptism as a sign of the baptized's fellowship with Christ rather than a sign and seal of the covenant of grace, and as a result did not baptize their children.

=== Modern ===
Friedrich Schleiermacher, an influential nineteenth-century Reformed theologian, saw baptism as the way the church receives new members and taught that faith is a precondition for baptism. He was ambivalent about the practice of infant baptism, teaching that it was not an essential institution, but could be continued as long as the church was faithful in bringing children to confirmation. Schleiermacher also saw baptism as primarily individual rather than initiating one into a covenant community, and rejected the idea that baptism should be connected with Old Testament circumcision.

Scottish nineteenth-century Reformed theologian William Cunningham also sought to articulate a distinctively Reformed theology of baptism in the modern world. Cunningham preferred the writings of Zwingli on the sacraments, writing that Calvin and later Reformed orthodox theologians overly elevated the value of the sacraments. He argued that the efficacy of baptism only applies to adults expressing faith in the act of baptism.

In the twentieth century, Karl Barth, an influential Swiss Reformed theologian, argued that baptism should not be administered to infants because it represented a completed association with Christ which could only be accepted or rejected by adults. Further, Barth in his later years rejected the idea that baptism was actually used by God to accomplish anything, or could even properly be called a sacrament. Instead, he taught that water baptism is a human act of obedience. His views have been called "neo-Zwinglian" for this reason, and he himself identified Zwingli's views on sacraments as the believer's oath as his own. He continued to accept the validity of infant baptisms, and did not believe those baptized as infants should be rebaptized.

Later Reformed theologians reacted against Barth's views on baptism by appealing to Calvin, the idea that baptism is a promise rather than an accomplished reality, and the idea of baptism as a replacement of circumcision. Scottish Reformed theologian T. F. Torrance emphasized the idea that baptism is God's word establishing the church, and that the individual's response comes after rather than before God's act in baptism. German Reformed liberation theologian Jürgen Moltmann, on the other hand, saw infant baptism as inappropriately associated with the national church. He saw baptism as properly a free response God's call to discipleship. Reformed churches have generally maintained the practice of infant baptism despite these critiques.

== Sacramental theology ==
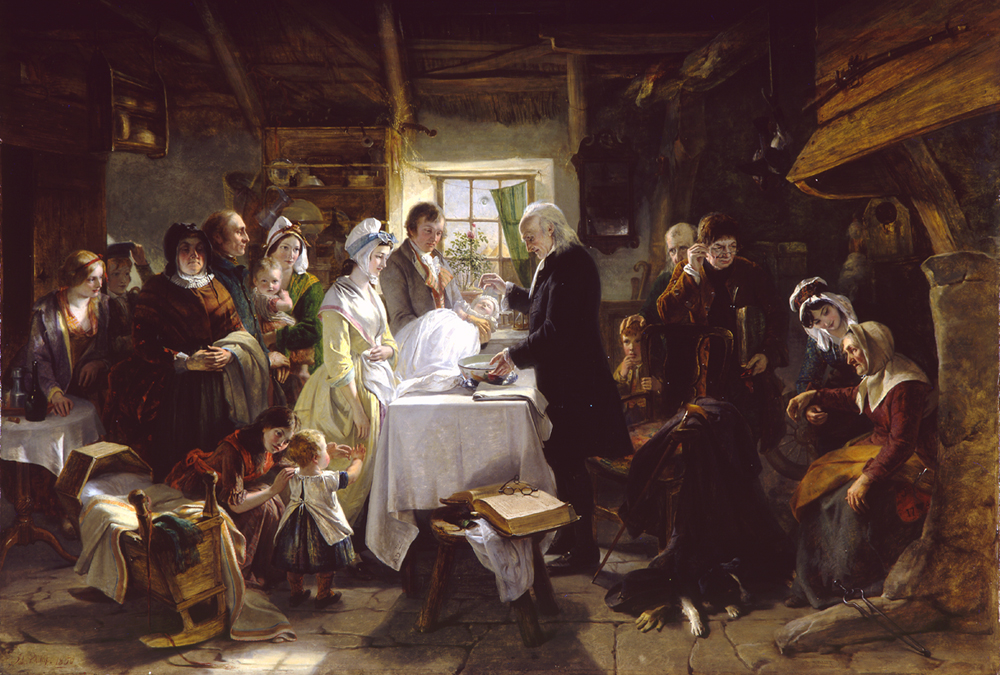
Baptism in Scotland by John Phillip

In Reformed theology, sacraments are held to be, along with the word of God preached, the means of grace. In the sacraments, God graciously condescends to use common material objects to communicate divine promises to people. The grace promised consists not only in benefits which God bestows on people, but Christ's person himself, to whom God unites the believer. Sacraments confirm or ratify the promises communicated in preaching. Both preaching and the sacraments are not merely symbolic and representative of the reality to which they refer, but actually create the reality of saving grace. The sacraments are made efficacious by the Holy Spirit in actually bringing into effect the promises signified in the sacraments. This efficacy is only beneficial, however, for those who have faith. The sacrament remains efficacious regardless of the recipient's response. Its effect is negative, resulting in judgement, for the faithless; while it confers Christ and his benefits for the faithful.

Reformed theologians believe sacraments to be instituted in the context of covenants between God and people. They believe that when God makes covenants, he provides physical signs associated with the covenant. Old Testament covenant signs include the rainbow which appeared following a covenant made with Noah. Circumcision is believed to be a sign of God's covenant with Abraham and his descendants. Such signs entail blessings and sanctions on those with whom God covenants. In the New Testament period there are two such signs or sacraments: baptism and the Lord's Supper.

In Reformed sacramental theology, the sign (in the case of baptism the external washing with water) may be described in terms of the thing signified (regeneration, remission of sin, etc.), because of the close connection between them. For example, baptism may be said to save, and baptism is often called the "laver of regeneration". However, there is also a distinction between the sign and thing signified. The sign is seen as a pledge and seal of the inward washing of regeneration and purification. The sacramental union between the sign and thing signified means that the use or purpose of the visible action of the sacrament is changed even as its substance remains the same.

== Meaning ==
The Reformed tradition holds that baptism is primarily God's promise or offer of grace to the baptized. Baptism is said to signify union with Christ in his death, burial, and resurrection. The baptized is made one with Christ's person, meaning God the Father treats them the same as he treats Christ. Baptism also unites the baptized with Christ's history, meaning that the person can be said to have died, been buried, and raised again just as Christ was. The baptized person's identity in Christ is based on Christ's action in baptism rather than the person's action. This union also unites Christians to one another. Through the words of institution used in baptism, Christians are also united to each of the members of the trinity.

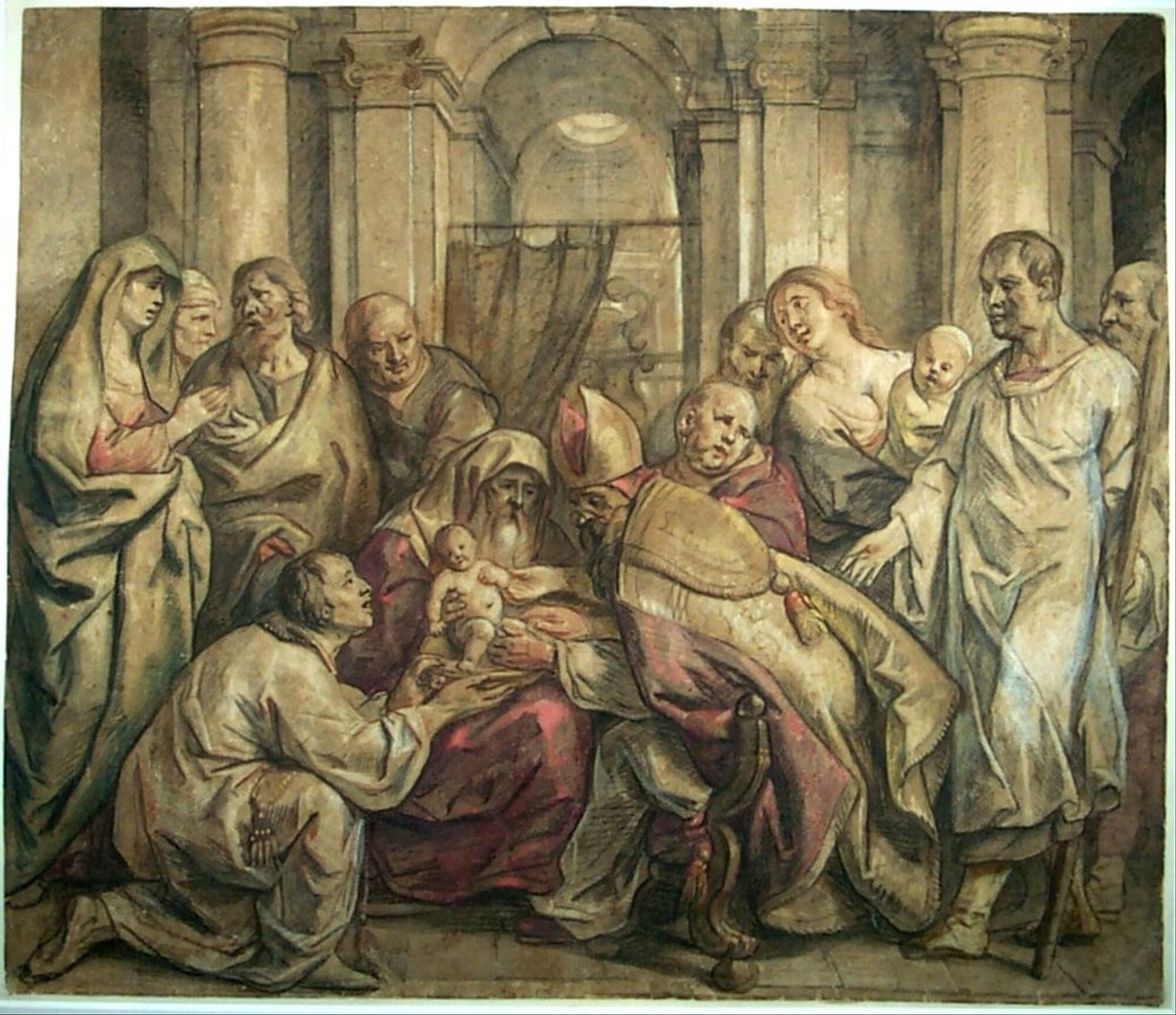
The Circumcision by Jacob Jordaens. Reformed theologians see baptism as the replacement or perfection of circumcision.

In the Reformed tradition, baptism's function as a rite of initiation into the church is secondary to its function as a sign of God's promise of grace. Reformed theologians distinguish between the visible church, which consists of those who publicly claim to have faith in Christ as well as their children; and the invisible church, which consists of those who actually have faith and have been regenerated. Baptism is believed to make one a member of the visible, rather than the invisible church. It is believed to be impossible to know who is a member of the invisible church. As members of the visible church, baptized Christians are believed to have obligations to live in love and service to Christ and his people. The fulfillment of these obligations is referred to as the "improvement" of one's baptism.

Reformed Christians see baptism as a replacement of circumcision in the Old Testament. Baptism does everything for New Testament Christians that circumcision did for Jews in the Old Testament. Circumcision is seen as a ritual where God's judgement passes over the person circumcised, only to cut off a part of the flesh, sparing the rest of the person. The "cutting off" of Christ in death is seen as a perfection of circumcision, and in baptism similarly the entire body is subjected to judgement and death in order to be raised again in new life.

Reformed Christians believe baptism to be a sign of regeneration, or the making of one into a new creature, based on the connection found in the New Testament between regeneration and washing with water. Baptism also represents forgiveness or remission of sin by the sprinkling of the blood of Christ, similarly to the sprinkling of blood of sacrificial animals. Baptism is held by almost the entire Reformed tradition to effect regeneration, even in infants who are incapable of faith, by effecting faith which would come to fruition later. However, Reformed theologians do not teach that baptism is necessarily bound to the forgiveness of sins, as opposed to the ex opere operato doctrine of baptismal regeneration. Not everyone who participates in the outward rite of baptism can be said to have had their sins forgiven. Rather, it is necessary that the baptized person participate spiritually by faith in order to receive this benefit.

== Infant baptism ==
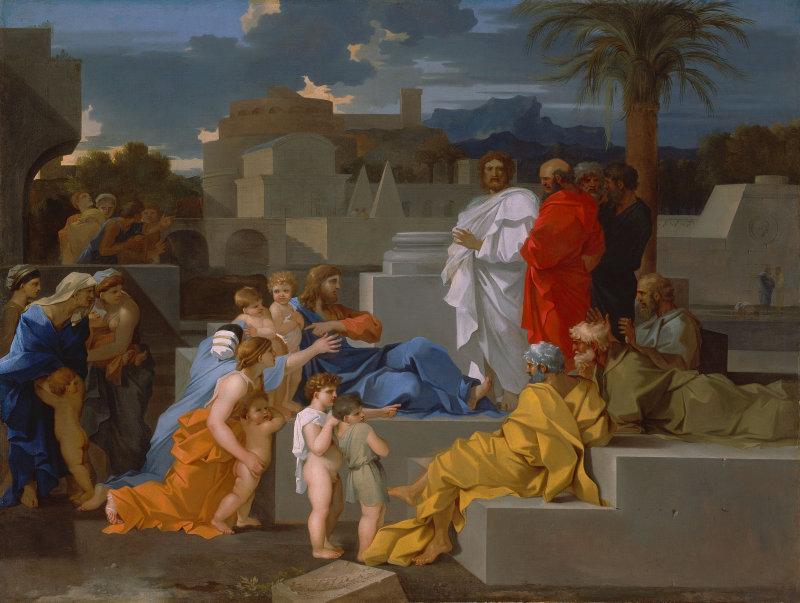
Bourdon, Sébastien (c. 1655), Christ Receiving the Children, Art Institute of Chicago. Protestant reformers emphasized the place of children in the believing community, leading to their increased presence in religious art.

With some notable exceptions such as Reformed Baptists, Reformed Christians baptize infants who are born to believing parents. Reformed Christians do so on the basis of the continuity from the old covenant between God and Israel and the new covenant with the church, since infants were circumcised under the old covenant. They also see God's saving purpose in the new covenant as having to do with families as well as individuals. Because Reformed Christians believe baptism must be embraced by faith to have any benefit, they recognize that faith may come later in life rather than preceding baptism. Infants may also be said to possess a seed of faith which will come to fruition later, or baptism may be administered based on a promise of faith offered by their sponsors (usually their parents) which will be kept at a later age.

== Mode and administration ==
Reformed Christians believe that immersion is not necessary for baptism to be properly performed, but that pouring or sprinkling are acceptable. Sprinkling is said to symbolize the sprinkling of the blood of Christ for the removal of the guilt of sin. Only ordained ministers are permitted to administer baptism in Reformed churches, contrary to the allowance for emergency baptism by midwives in Roman Catholic churches, though baptisms performed by non-ministers are generally considered valid. In general, Reformed churches, while rejecting the baptismal ceremonies of the Roman Catholic church (such as the use of chrism, salt, and insufflation), accept the validity of baptisms performed with them on the basis that the substance of baptism remains. They do not rebaptize someone who has been baptized using these ceremonies because baptism is never to be repeated. Beginning in the nineteenth century, some American Old School Presbyterians began to reject the validity of Roman Catholic baptisms on the ground that that church has become so corrupted that it is not longer a "true church" and its sacraments cannot be valid. However, prominent Old School theologian Charles Hodge strongly opposed this view and held that baptisms involving washing with water in the name of the trinity and the intent to comply with Christ's command were valid.

== Bibliography ==
- Allen, R. Michael (2010). Reformed Theology. New York: T&T Clark. ISBN 978-0-567-03430-4.
- Benedict, Philip (2002). Christ's Churches Purely Reformed. New Haven: Yale University Press. ISBN 978-0-300-10507-0.
- Brownson, James V. (2007). The Promise of Baptism: An Introduction to Baptism in Scripture and the Reformed Tradition. Grand Rapids, Michigan: William B. Eerdmans. ISBN 978-0-8028-3307-5.
- Dyrness, William A. (2004). Reformed Theology and Visual Culture: The Protestant Imagination from Calvin to Edwards. Cambridge University Press.
- Fesko, J. V. (2013) [2010]. Word, Water, and Spirit: A Reformed Perspective on Baptism. Grand Rapids, Michigan: Reformation Heritage. ISBN 978-1-60178-282-3.
- Horton, Michael S. (2008). People and Place: A Covenant Ecclesiology. Louisville, KY: Westminster John Knox. ISBN 978-0-664-23071-5.
- Hunsinger, George; Moore-Keish, Martha L. (2015). "Twentieth-Century and Contemporary Protestant Sacramental Theology". In Boersma, Hans; Levering, Matthew (eds.). The Oxford Handbook of Sacramental Theology. Oxford: Oxford University Press. doi:10.1093/oxfordhb/9780199659067.013.4. ISBN 978-0-19-965906-7.
- Letham, Robert (2009). The Westminster Assembly: Reading Its Theology in Historical Context. The Westminster Assembly and the Reformed Faith. Phillipsburg, New Jersey: P&R. ISBN 978-0-87552-612-6.
- McKim, Donald K. (2001). Introducing the Reformed Faith. Louisville, KY: Westminster John Knox. ISBN 978-0-664-25644-9.
- McMaken, W. Travis (2013). The Sign of the Gospel: Toward an Evangelical Doctrine of Infant Baptism after Karl Barth. Minneapolis, Minnesota: Fortress. ISBN 9781451465372 – via Project MUSE.
- Murray, John (1980). Christian Baptism. Phillipsburg, New Jersey: Presbyterian and Reformed. ISBN 0-87552-343-9.
- Presbyterian Church in America (1987). Report of the Study Committee on the Validity of Certain Baptisms (PDF) (Report). PCA Historical Center.
- Riggs, John W. (2002). Baptism in the Reformed Tradition: A Historical and Practical Theology. Louisville, KY: Westminster John Knox. ISBN 0-664-21966-7.
- Rohls, Jan (1998) [1987]. Theologie reformierter Bekenntnisschriften [Reformed Confessions: Theology from Zurich to Barmen] (in German). Translated by John Hoffmeyer. Louisville, Kentucky: Westminster John Knox. ISBN 0-664-22078-9.
- Swain, Scott R. (2015). "Lutheran and Reformed Sacramental Theology: Seventeenth–Nineteenth Centuries". In Boersma, Hans; Levering, Matthew (eds.). The Oxford Handbook of Sacramental Theology. Oxford: Oxford University Press. doi:10.1093/oxfordhb/9780199659067.013.16. ISBN 978-0-19-965906-7.
- Sykes, Stephen W. (1994). "The Sacraments". In Hodgson, Peter C.; King, Robert H. (eds.). Christian Theology: An Introduction to Its Traditions and Tasks. Minneapolis, Minnesota: Fortress. Archived from the original on 2015-11-25 – via Questia.
- Trigg, Jonathan D. (2001). Baptism in the Theology of Martin Luther. Boston: Brill. Archived from the original on 2015-12-08 – via Questia.
- Venema, Cornelis P. (2000). "Sacraments and Baptism in the Reformed Confessions" (PDF). Mid-America Journal of Theology. 11: 21–86.
- Vissers, John (2011). "Baptism in the Reformed Tradition". In Heath, Gordon L.; Dvorak, James D. (eds.). Baptism: Historical, Theological, and Pastoral Perspectives. Eugene, OR: Pickwick.
- Wawrykow, Joseph P. (2015). "The Sacraments in Thirteenth-Century Theology". In Boersma, Hans; Levering, Matthew (eds.). The Oxford Handbook of Sacramental Theology. Oxford: Oxford University Press. doi:10.1093/oxfordhb/9780199659067.013.44. ISBN 978-0-19-965906-7.
