= Infant faith =

Concept in Christianity

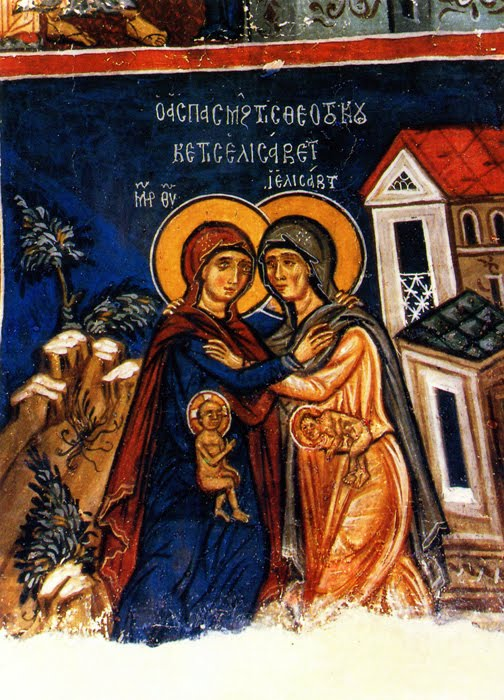
A painting of the Visitation of Mary, at which time John the Baptist leaped in Elizabeth's womb

In Christian theology, infant faith (Latin: fides infantium) is faith in Jesus Christ exercised by infants. Protestant reformer Martin Luther, who emphasized that salvation is attained through faith alone, argued for infant faith using the example of John the Baptist leaping in Elizabeth's womb during the visitation of the pregnant Mary. John Calvin also believed infants were capable of exercising faith, and used this as an argument in favor of infant baptism, though it was not considered essential to his defense of the practice. This was also the view of Reformed orthodox theologians Johannes Wollebius and William Ames.
