= Prophesying (preaching service) =

Approach to biblical analysis

Prophesyings were religious training exercises favoured by Puritan clergy in England, significant during the 1570s. For a given Biblical text, a number of sermons would be given, which were then analysed by those present, under the guidance of a moderator. Proponents would cite a biblical passage in 1 Corinthians 14 to support of the practice: "let the prophets speak two or three".

== Origins in Switzerland ==
The institution of "prophesyings" dated back to the beginning of the Protestant Reformation, and Huldrych Zwingli who started them. The use of the word "prophecy" rested on a remark of Erasmus, on the terminology used by St Paul for the explanation of Scripture. In the 1520s Zwingli introduced prophezey as a daily exercise in the Grossmünster, Zurich. Patrick Collinson argues that the library of Zwingli's successor, Heinrich Bullinger, was intended as a training resource for students and clergy. The Carolinum was established in the cloister of the Grossmünster.

== Uptake in England ==
Elizabeth I of England objected to the practice, which propagated Puritan approaches to the Bible and theology, but also was being used covertly to put together a Presbyterian system in England. She applied pressure to Edmund Grindal, the Archbishop of Canterbury, to close down the prophesyings. Grindal saw virtues in the development, in terms of improving the standard of preaching, refused to act decisively, and was sidelined. There was an official ban on prophesyings, from 1577, in the Province of Canterbury.
