= Savoy Declaration =

Doctrinal statement for English Congregationalists

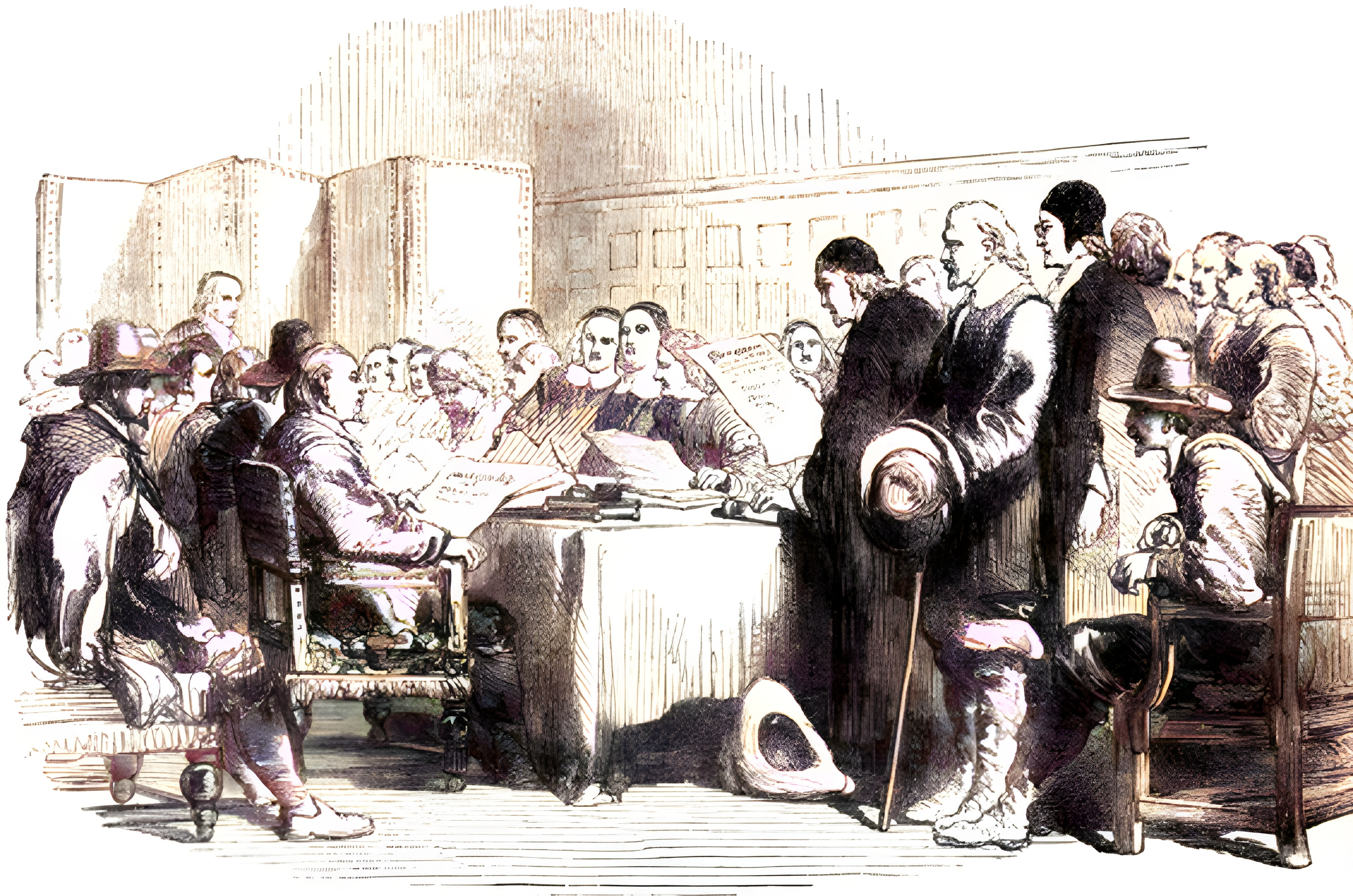
Artist's rendition of the Savoy Assembly

The Savoy Declaration is a Congregationalist confession of faith, also called A Declaration of the Faith and Order owned and practised in the Congregational Churches in England. It was drawn up in October 1658 by English Independents and Congregationalists meeting at the Savoy Hospital, London. It consists of a preface, a confession, and a platform of discipline.

== The Savoy Assembly ==
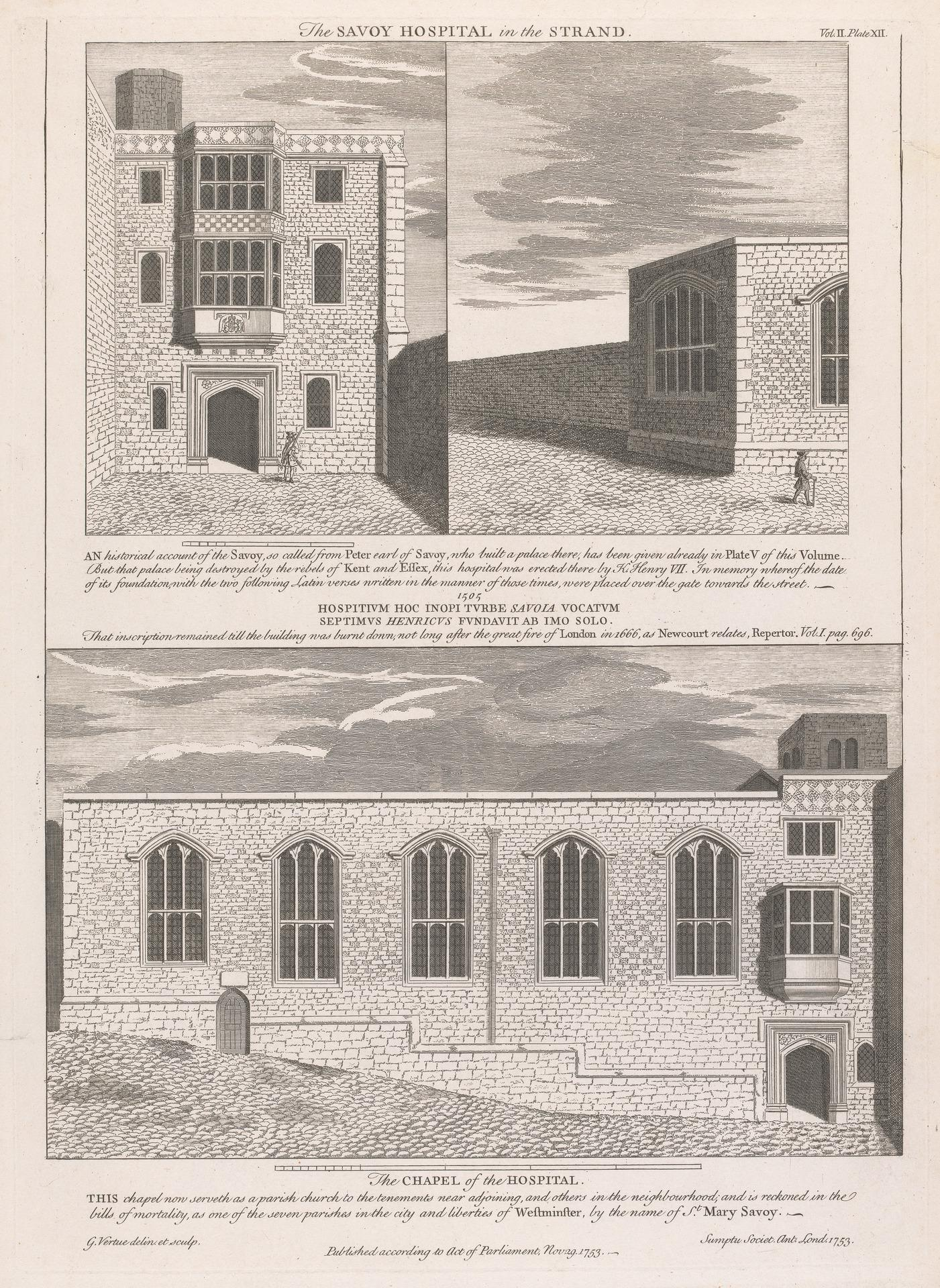
Savoy Hospital

The Savoy Assembly met at the Savoy for eleven or twelve days from 12 October 1658. Representatives, mostly laymen, were present from more than one hundred independent churches. Thomas Goodwin, who was a Westminster divine and author of the Westminster Confession of Faith, and John Owen were the leaders in a committee of six divines appointed to draw up a confession. The writers were influenced by the Cambridge Platform, which was the statement of church government produced by the Congregational churches in New England. The 1647 Westminster Confession of Faith of the Church of England was used as a basic template.

== Confession ==
Thomas Goodwin, author of the Westminster Confession of Faith, saw the Savoy Declaration as a revision of the Westminster Confession with the "latest and best". The Savoy Declaration authors adopted, with a few alterations, the doctrinal definitions of the Westminster confession, reconstructing only the part relating to church government; the main effect of the Declaration of the Savoy assembly was to confirm the Westminster theology. There was the addition of a new chapter entitled Of the Gospel, and of the Extent of the Grace Thereof. Other changes include a replacement to chapters 30 and 31 of the Westminster Confession concerned with Congregational church government. In these chapters the autonomy of local churches is asserted. It also included the words "Christ's active obedience" in chapter 11: Of Justification. While "the assembly voting almost unanimously that both Christ’s active and passive obedience were necessary for justification", the words "active" as well as "whole" were omitted. Because exact wording is required the Savoy Declaration makes this explicit.

The Declaration would be adopted by the Reforming Synod in Colonial New England in 1680.

=== Emendations ===
The following is a chapter comparison between Westminster and Savoy:

Westminster	Savoy	Notes
1. Of the Holy Scripture	1. Of the Holy Scripture	
2. Of God, and of the Holy Trinity	2. Of God, and of the Holy Trinity	
3. Of God's Eternal Decree	3. Of God's Eternal Decree	
4. Of Creation	4. Of Creation	
5. Of Providence	5. Of Providence	
6. Of the Fall of Man, of Sin, and of the Punishment Thereof	6. Of the Fall of Man, of Sin, and of the Punishment Thereof	
7- Of God's Covenant with Man	7. Of God's Covenant with Man	
8. Of Christ the Mediator	8. Of Christ the Mediator	
9. Of Free Will	9. Of Free Will	
10. Of Effectual Calling	10. Of Effectual Calling	
11. Of Justification	11. Of Justification	
12. Of Adoption	12. Of Adoption	
13. Of Sanctification	13. Of Sanctification	
14. Of Saving Faith	14. Of Saving Faith	
15. Of Repentance Unto Life	15. Of Repentance unto Life and Salvation	Significantly rewritten
16. Of Good Works	16. Of Good Works	
17. Of The Perseverance of the Saints	17. Of the Perseverance of the Saints	
18. Of the Assurance of Grace and Salvation	18. Of the Assurance of Grace and Salvation	
19. Of the Law of God	19. Of the Law of God	
	20. Of the Gospel and the Extent of Grace Thereof	New to Savoy
20. Of Christian Liberty, and Liberty of Conscience	21. Of Christian Liberty, and Liberty of Conscience	
21. Of Religious Worship and the Sabbath Day	22. Of Religious Worship and the Sabbath Day	
22. Of Lawful Oaths and Vows	23. Of Lawful Oaths and Vows	
23. Of the Civil Magistrate	24. Of the Civil Magistrate	
24. Of Marriage and Divorce	25. Of Marriage	
25. Of the Church	26. Of the Church	Removes 2 articles, adds 31
26. Of the Communion of the Saints	27. Of the Communion of Saints	
27. Of the Sacraments	28. Of the Sacraments	
28. Of Baptism	29. Of Baptism	
29. Of the Lord's Supper	30. Of the Lord's Supper	
30. Of Church Censures		Removed in Savoy
31. Of Synods and Councils		Removed in Savoy
32. Of the State of Man After Death, and of the Resurrection of the Dead	31. Of the State of Men after Death, and of the Resurrection of the Dead	
33. Of the Last Judgment	32. Of the Last Judgment	

== Platform of Discipline ==
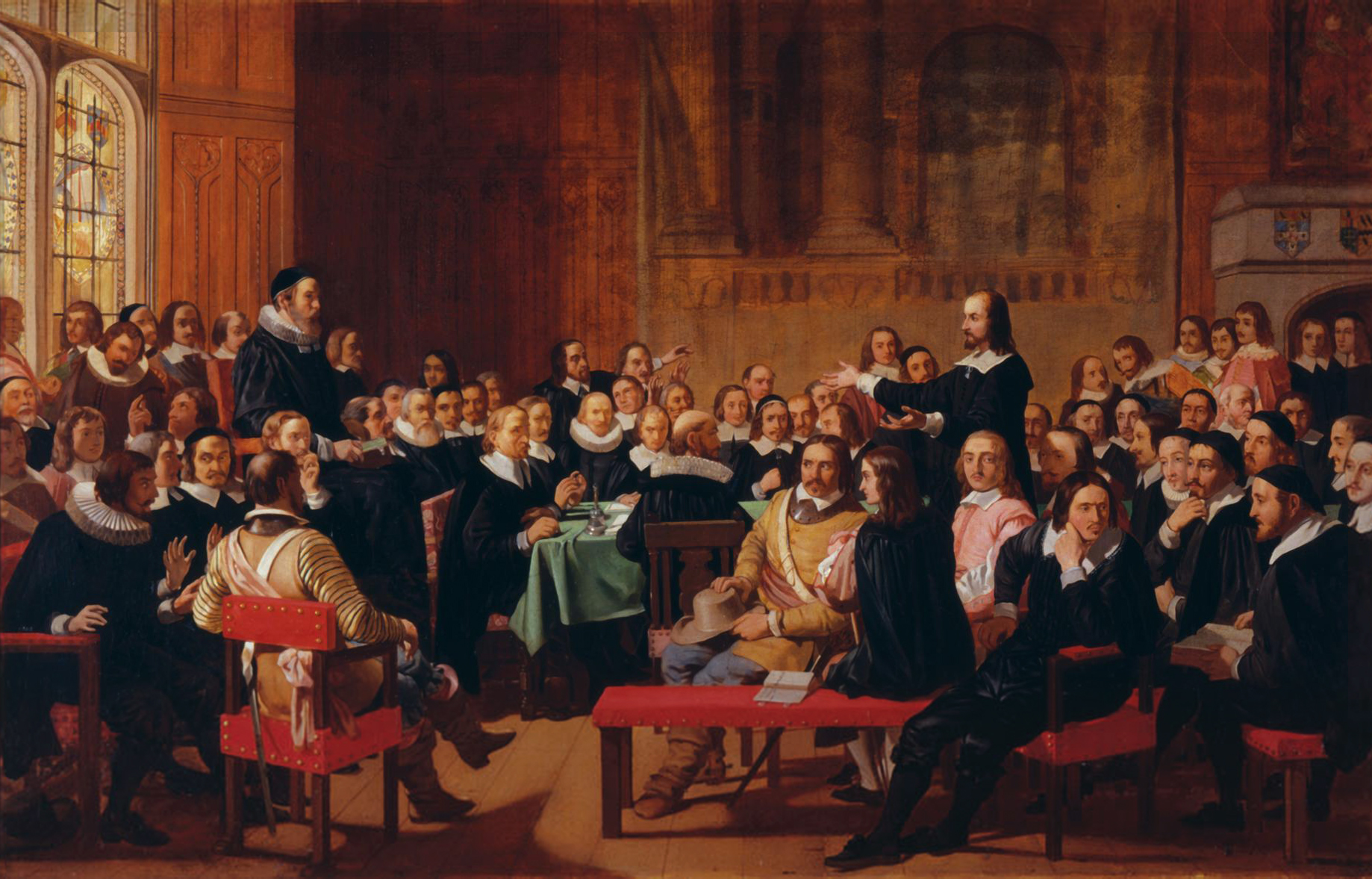
Phillip Nye arguing for congregational polity at the Westminster Assembly

Formally titled Of the Institution of Churches, and the Order appointed in them by Jesus Christ, the platform is composed of 30 articles and sets forth the principles of Congregational Church polity.

It is a new document, not a revision of either the earlier congregationalist Cambridge Platform or the Form of Presbyterial Church Government produced by the Westminster Assembly, at which key framers of Savoy were present.

== See also ==
- Westminster Confession
- Saybrook Platform
- Second London Confession
