= Cambridge Platform =

1648 statement of church government

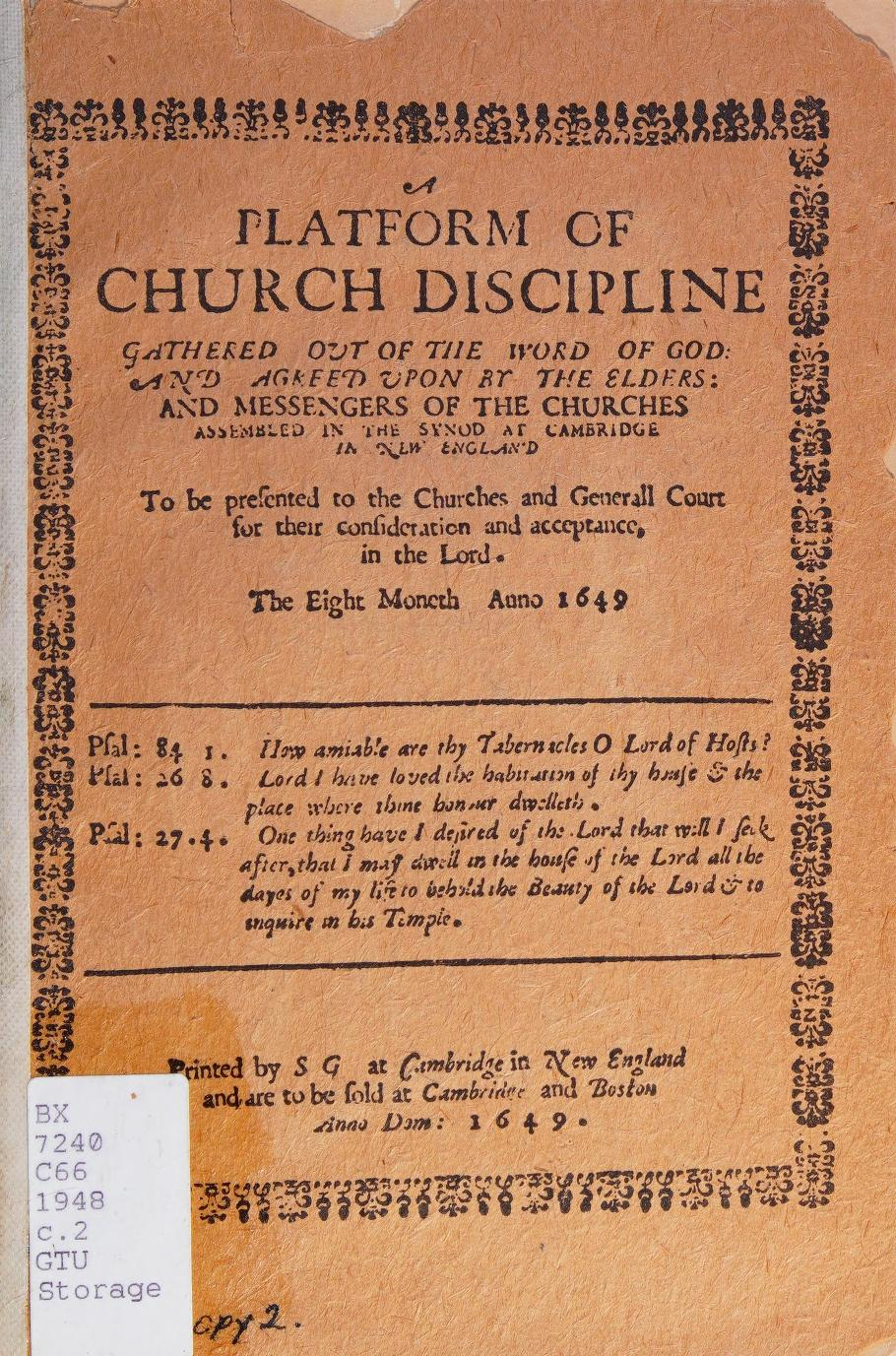
Title page, "A Platform of Church Discipline"

The Cambridge Platform is a statement of congregational church government for the churches of colonial New England. It was written in 1648 in response to Presbyterian criticism and served as the religious constitution of Massachusetts until 1780. The platform's preface also praised the Westminster Confession. The document was shaped primarily by the Puritan ministers Richard Mather and John Cotton.

== Background ==
The Puritans who settled colonial New England were Calvinists who believed in congregational church government and that the church should include only regenerated persons as full members. Because of this, they became known as Congregationalists and their churches became known as Congregational churches. In New England Congregationalism was the established religion—Congregational churches were supported financially by taxation and, in Massachusetts, only Congregational church members could vote.

In the 1640s, Congregationalism faced heightened scrutiny from English Presbyterians, who were gaining power due to the English Civil War. As Calvinists, Congregationalists and Presbyterians were nearly identical in their beliefs with the exception of church government. Presbyterian polity gave authority to a presbytery of elders outside of the local church. In addition, Presbyterians did not insist upon a regenerate church membership and allowed all "non-scandalous" churchgoers to receive the Lord's Supper.

In 1645, local Presbyterians led by William Vassal and Robert Child staged a protest against Massachusetts' policies on church membership and voting. Child threatened to take his complaints to Parliament, provoking fear among colonial leaders that the English government might intervene to force Presbyterianism on New England. The Cambridge Synod was called in response to these attacks on Congregationalism.

== Synod ==
In May 1646, a group of Massachusetts ministers asked the colony's General Court to call for a meeting of the colony's churches for the purpose of establishing a uniform set of practices. Specific points of concern involved church membership and baptism of the children of non-members. The Cambridge Synod first met on September 1, 1646, and would continue to meet periodically until August 1648 when its work was completed. Its membership included ministers and lay delegates from all but four of the 29 churches in Massachusetts, and it also had the support of the 24 churches in the other Puritan colonies of New Hampshire, Plymouth, Connecticut and New Haven. Some churches in these colonies also sent ministers and delegates.

The synod tasked John Cotton, Richard Mather and Ralph Partridge of Duxbury to each write a model of church government for the group's consideration. Ultimately, Mather's Platform of Church Discipline was adopted by the synod, and it included much that had been previously written on church government by Mather and Cotton. The General Court also requested that the synod adopt a confession of faith. By this time, the Westminster Confession of Faith, which had been written by English Puritans, had already been adopted by Parliament. The synod unanimously voted to accept the doctrinal portions of the confession, stating that they "do judge it to be very holy, orthodox, and judicious in all matters of faith; and do therefore freely and fully consent thereunto, for the substance thereof." The synod disagreed with portions of the Confession dealing with presbyterian church polity.

== Contents ==
=== Congregational polity ===
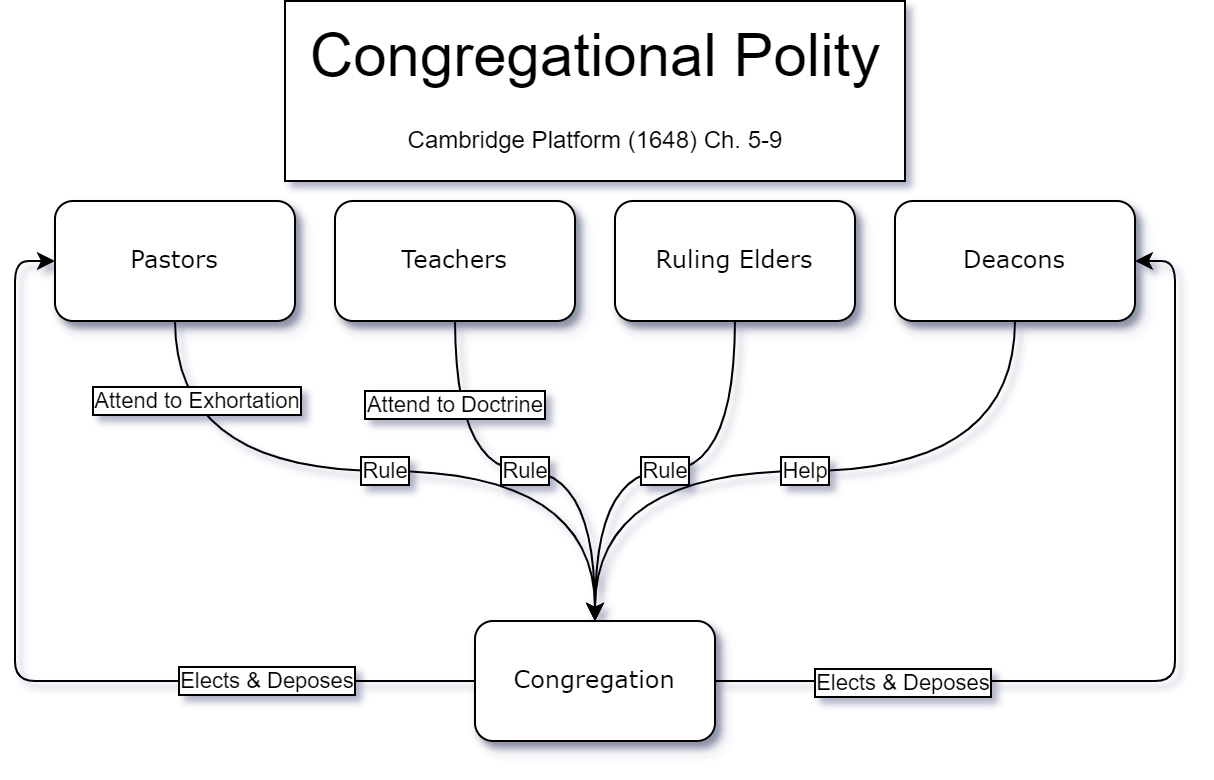
A diagram illustrating the polity of the Cambridge Platform.

The platform is organized into a preface and 17 chapters. The preface, written by John Cotton, counters various criticisms leveled against the New England churches and defends their orthodoxy. The first four chapters explain that congregational polity is the only form of church government authorized in the Bible.

A Congregational church is defined as "a company of saints by calling, united into one body by a holy covenant, for the public worship of God, and the mutual edification one of another, in the fellowship of the Lord Jesus." A local church is a "visible political union" that saints enter into by voluntary, mutual consent on the basis of a church covenant. This distinguished the Congregationalists from the Roman Catholic Church and the Church of England, in which everyone within a certain region was given membership in the church.

The platform states that a church should operate under a mixed government, with elements of monarchy (Jesus Christ is king and head of the church), democracy (congregational governance) and aristocracy (rule by officers). The authority given to the congregation includes choosing its own officers, admitting new church members, public censure, excommunication, and restoration to church fellowship.

=== Church officers ===
==== Extraordinary ====
The extraordinary offices of the church are Apostle, Prophet and Evangelist; extraordinarily called during Christ's ministry and whose offices "ended with themselves."

==== Ordinary ====
The ordinary (ongoing) offices are Pastor, Teacher, Ruling Elder and Deacon.

===== Elder =====
Pastor, teacher and ruling elder are each types of elder.

Of elders, who are also in scripture called bishops, some attend chiefly to the ministry of the word, as the pastors and teachers; others attend especially unto rule, who are therefore called ruling elders.

====== Pastor ======
The office of pastor and teacher, appears to be distinct. The pastor's special work is, to attend to exhortation, and therein to administer a word of wisdom ...

====== Teacher ======
... the teacher is to attend to doctrine, and therein to administer a word of knowledge

====== Ruling Elder ======
The ruling elder's work is to join with the pastor and teacher in those acts of spiritual rule which are distinct from the ministry of the word and sacraments committed to them

===== Deacon =====
The office of a deacon is instituted in the church by the Lord Jesus; sometimes they are called helps

Both pastors and teachers can administer sacraments and execute church discipline, but pastors "attend to exhortation, and therein to administer a word of wisdom", while teachers "attend to doctrine, and therein to administer a word of knowledge".

Ruling elders, along with the ministers, are responsible for overseeing the spiritual affairs of the church, including examining any potential officers or members before being approved by the church, ordaining officers chosen by the church, receiving and preparing accusations to be presented to the church, pronouncing sentence of censure or excommunication with consent of the church, moderating church business meetings, acting as guides and leaders in church administration, and admonishing church members when needed. Deacons oversee the worldly or financial affairs of the church, which include collecting contributions and gifts, paying the ministers and distributing charity to the poor. In addition to the two offices, the platform also states that elderly widows may also have a ministry within the church, including "giving attendance to the sick, and to give succor unto them, and others in the like necessities."

Church members elect their officers and can depose them as well. The platform recommends that when possible neighboring churches be consulted concerning the trial of officers. It rejects any right of government officials, diocesan bishops or patrons to appoint church officers. After election, officers are to be ordained by laying on of hands, prayer and fasting; nevertheless, the platform notes that it is election that makes one an officer, not ordination. Normally, elders are to perform the laying on of hands. If a church lacked elders, however, church members themselves could ordain their officers or the church could invite elders from neighboring churches to perform the ordination.

=== Church membership ===
Chapter 12 stipulates that individuals seeking church membership must first undergo examination by the elders for evidence of repentance of sin and faith in Jesus Christ. The person would then be expected to give a "relation" or public account of their conversion experience before the entire congregation prior to becoming a member. Those who suffered from "excessive fear or infirmity" could give their confession to the elders in private, however. Those who were baptized as children are also required to be examined before they can exercise the privileges of full membership, such as participating in the Lord's Supper.

Chapter 13 describes procedures for transferring from one Congregational church to another, and chapter 14 describes procedures for censuring and excommunicating members who refuse to repent of offenses.

=== Relations with other churches and the state ===
Though distinct and lacking authority over one another, the platform affirms the importance of maintaining communion among Congregational churches. Six ways of showing the communion of churches are identified:

1. taking thought for each other's welfare
2. consulting on any topic or cause where another church has more familiarity or information about a topic
3. admonishing another church, even to the point of convening a synod of neighboring churches and ceasing communion with the offending church
4. allowing members of one church to fully participate and receive the Lord's Supper in another church
5. sending letters of recommendation when a member goes to a new church, due to a seasonal or permanent relocation
6. financial support for poor churches

Congregational churches may call for elders and other congregational representatives to meet together in a synod or church council to argue, debate and determine matters of religion. Civil authorities may also call synods to provide religious advice and counsel. Because each Congregational church is self-governing, synods can only advise and recommend. Synods cannot exercise jurisdiction or authority over a local church.

Chapter 17 affirms that church officers may not interfere with the civil government nor government officials with the church. However, the government should punish idolatry, blasphemy, heresy, and "the venting of corrupt and pernicious opinions".

== Use and influence ==
The synod completed the Cambridge Platform in 1648, and after the churches were given time to study the document, provide feedback, and finally ratify it, the General Court commended it as an accurate description of Congregational practice. While the platform was legally nonbinding and intended only to be descriptive, it soon became regarded by ministers and lay people alike as the religious constitution of Massachusetts, guaranteeing the rights of church officers and members.

Congregational minister Albert Elijah Dunning wrote that it was "the most important document produced by the Congregationalists of the seventeenth century, for it most clearly represents the belief of the churches and their system of government for more than one hundred years". In Connecticut, it was replaced by the Saybrook Platform of 1708, which brought the Congregational churches closer to a presbyterian form of government.

The document has significant ramifications for the polity of certain denominations today. For example, the congregations of the United Church of Christ, Unitarian Universalist churches, and other present-day descendants of the Puritan churches maintain congregational polity as their local church organization, while establishing extensive denominational administrations to ensure ministerial oversight and facilitate communication between denominations. When some Churches of the Standing Order in New England became Unitarian following the Unitarian Controversy, they kept a congregational polity. This polity had a profound influence on the organization and polity of the American Unitarian Association, and, in turn, that of the Unitarian Universalist Association—an organization that, while despite significant theological differences from the signers of the 1648 document, still shares many aspects of the same polity.

Its influence extended beyond what is today the United States. The platform played a role in shaping the Savoy Declaration of 1658, which was produced by English Congregationalists.
