= Depravity =

Depravity may refer to:

- Total depravity, a theological doctrine that derives from the Augustinian concept of original sin
- Lack of morality
- Sin, an act that violates a known moral rule
  - in the Hebrew Bible, Jewish views on sin#Terminology
- Depravity (album), an album by A Plea for Purging
- Depravity – 2024 American thriller film

== See also ==
- The Depraved (disambiguation)
- Deviance
- Deprivation (disambiguation)
- Iniquity (disambiguation)
- Perversity (disambiguation)
