= All Saints' Church, Babworth =

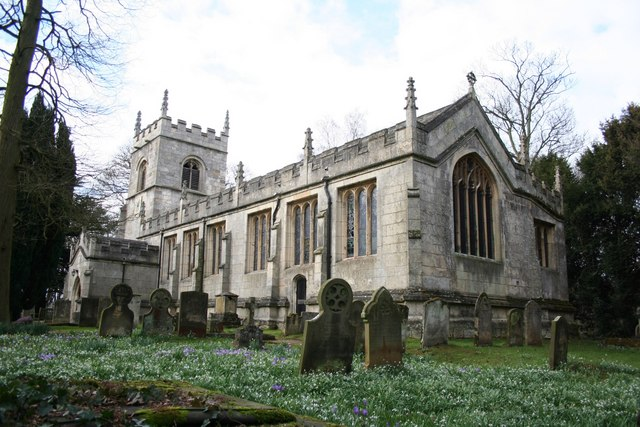
- All Saints' Church, Babworth
- All Saints' Church, Babworth
- 53°19′12.81″N 0°58′15.75″W
- Location: Babworth
- Country: England
- Denomination: Church of England

History
- Dedication: All Saints'

Architecture
- Heritage designation: Grade I listed

Administration
- Province: York
- Diocese: Diocese of Southwell and Nottingham
- Archdeaconry: Newark
- Deanery: Bassetlaw and Bawtry
- Parish: Babworth

Clergy
- Bishop: Rt Rev Porter (Bishop of Sherwood)
- Vicar: Rev Dr M Vasey-Saunders
- Dean: Vacancy

All Saints' Church, is a Grade I listed parish church in the Church of England in Babworth, Nottinghamshire, England.

== History ==
The church was built in the 15th century, and restored in 1860 and 1878. It is a small structure with a tower steeple with three old bells, (to which were added three newly cast bells in the late 1950s) and a clock, a nave, chancel and a porch. Most of the building dates from the 15th century, with several 18th-century memorials and 19th-century stained glass by Charles Eamer Kempe. The chancel and sanctuary contain furniture by Robert (Mousey) Thompson, featuring his trademark mouse carvings. In early spring the church is surrounded by a spectacular display of snowdrops, which the public is free to visit.

According to Piercy, in 1295 the advowson of Babworth church was the property of Robert de Swillington, "who had free warren in Babworth". In 1365 after Swillington's death, it became the property of Sir Thomas de Grendon, who sold it to Sir William Trussbutt. Trussbutt is said to have presented it to the priory of Newstead, having first obtained the king's licence, and the licence of Sir Thomas de Saundby to do so. Newstead priory remained in possession of the church until 1531, until the prior of Newstead, John Blake, granted it and one acre of land to John Hercy, Esq. of Grove for the sum of fifteen pounds. In 1674 it became the property of the Wortleys, from whom it was purchased by John Simpson, Esq.

Piercy describes the church favourably as "a small but handsome structure of stone, advantageously situated on a rising ground. It consists of tower steeple, with three bells, and clock, a nave and chancel uniform in their windows, height, and battlements, with a side aisle and vestry, and a handsome porch. The whole is of the later period of the Gothic architecture. The little burial plot which surrounds it, is considerably elevated, being connected with, or rather enclosed within the elegant pleasure grounds of the adjacent buildings; while the fine trees, aged and bowery, enhance materially the charming effect of the ivy-mantled tower."

Richard Clyfton was instituted on 11 July 1586 to the rectory of All Saints'. He lost his position as rector of Babworth through deprivation on 7 June 1605. He joined the Separatist Scrooby Congregation before emigrating to Amsterdam. Clyfton is known for his connection with the Pilgrims – the early settlers of the Plymouth Colony in present-day Massachusetts, USA. A street in Plymouth, Massachusetts, is named after him.

== Group of churches ==
The Babworth Group of Churches is made up of:

- All Saints, Babworth
- St Martin's, Ranby
- St John's, Scofton with Osberton

== Clergy ==
The present Team Vicar is The Rev Dr Vasey-Saunders.

- Previous Clergy:
- Rev Robert Smith
- Rev Charles Wasteneys Eyre MA 1830 Rector (Dispensation)
- Rev John Eyre MA, BA 1830 Rector
- Rev John Twells BA Licensed 18 July 1830 Curate

== See also ==
- Grade I listed buildings in Nottinghamshire
- Listed buildings in Babworth
