= St Wilfrid's Church, Scrooby =

Church in Scrooby, Nottinghamshire, England

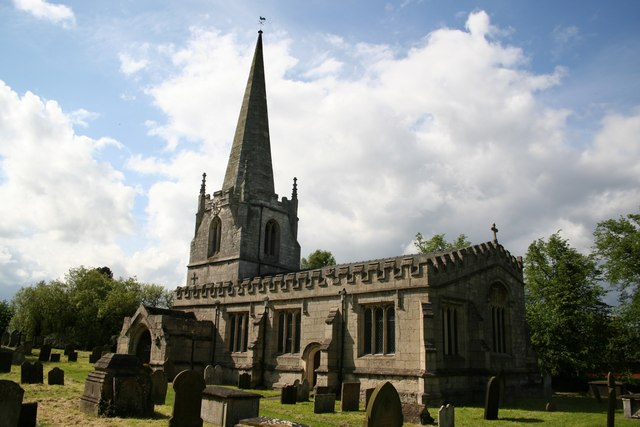
- St Wilfrid's Church, Scrooby
- St Wilfrid's Church, Scrooby
- 53°24′32.74″N 1°01′14.34″W
- OS grid reference: SK 65220 90754
- Location: Scrooby
- Country: England
- Denomination: Church of England

History
- Dedication: St Wilfrid

Architecture
- Heritage designation: Grade II listed

Administration
- Province: York
- Diocese: Southwell and Nottingham
- Archdeaconry: Newark
- Deanery: Bassetlaw and Bawtry
- Parish: Scrooby with Ranskill

St Wilfrid's Church, Scrooby is a Grade II* listed parish church in the Church of England in Scrooby.

The church was built in the 15th century and was restored in 1864 after many years of disrepair.

Scrooby harboured a Separatist Puritan group, 1606–8, which fled to Holland in 1608 and then in 1620 sailed to America in the Mayflower. William Brewster, one of the Pilgrim Fathers and a ruling elder, worshipped in Scrooby Church.

It contains an organ dating from 1871 by Gray and Davison.

== See also ==
- Grade II* listed buildings in Nottinghamshire
- Listed buildings in Scrooby
