= Richard Clyfton =

English church minister (d. 1616)

Richard Clyfton (or Clifton) (died 1616) was an English Separatist minister, at Scrooby, Nottinghamshire, and then in Amsterdam. Clyfton is known for his connection with the Pilgrims – the early settlers of the Plymouth Colony in present-day Massachusetts, USA.

== Life ==
Clyfton was born around 1553 near the Nottinghamshire village of Babworth but left to attend the University of Cambridge, a focus of English puritanism. He returned home an ordained minister and was named rector of All Saints' Church, Babworth in 1586. With a 'living' he was able to marry. He and his wife Anne had three sons and three daughters, all born at Babworth. The three daughters died in infancy or childhood, but the three Clyfton sons survived.

Clifton died at Amsterdam on 20 May 1616, and is buried in the Zuiderkerk. The church where he is buried is now an information centre.

== Ministry ==
Clifton was instituted to the vicarage of Marnham, near Newark-on-Trent, on 12 February 1585 and on 11 July 1586 to the rectory of All Saints' Church, Babworth, near Retford. He lost his position as rector of Babworth through deprivation by 7 June 1605.

The Separatist congregation at Scrooby, which was formed after Clyfton's ejection from Babworth in 1605, ordinarily met in William Brewster's house at Scrooby for a few months. John Robinson attached himself to Clyfton's church and was chosen his assistant in the ministry; and after Clyfton's move to the Netherlands became sole pastor of the church. William Bradford belonged to this congregation. Bradford had first encountered Clifton when he was in Scrooby.

Clifton emigrated to Amsterdam in August 1608. He joined other exiles there and attached himself to the church of which Francis Johnson was pastor. He was, perhaps, on Henry Ainsworth's departure (16 December 1610) made teacher among them. Bradford describes him as a "grave and fatherly old man when he left England, having a great white beard".

=== Separatists ===
Clifton was a member and leader of the Pilgrims. He led a congregation with William Brewster. Clyfton was one of the most effective authors for the Pilgrim Separatists. The English Separatist congregation that became the core of the Pilgrim movement had two pastors, Clyfton and John Robinson. Neither saw the "promised land" of Plymouth Colony. Robinson was with the congregation (although not yet pastor) when they moved from England to Holland in search of religious freedom. He was a strong proponent of the group's later move from Holland to America, where they would reestablish their church in the Plymouth Colony.

Bradford describes how the Puritan Separatists in the area of England sometimes called "Pilgrim Country" (Nottinghamshire, Lincolnshire and Yorkshire) organized themselves into two distinct Separatist churches. One was the church in Gainsborough, Lincolnshire, with John Smyth as senior elder and Thomas Helwys as joint-elder, meeting at Gainsborough Old Hall. The other was the Scrooby Church (eventually the Pilgrim Church) in Scrooby, Nottinghamshire (initially meeting at Babworth), under the leadership of Clyfton, about ten miles from Gainsborough.

"In one of these churches [Gainsborough]… was Mr. John Smith, a man of able gifts and a good preacher, who afterwards was chosen their pastor. But these afterwards falling into some errors in the Low Countries [The Netherlands], there (for the most part) buried themselves and their names. But in this other church [Scrooby]…besides other worthy men, was Mr. Richard Clyfton, a grave and reverend preacher, who by his pains and diligence had done much good, and under God had been a means of the conversion of many. And also that famous and worthy man Mr. John Robinson, who afterwards was their pastor for many years, till the Lord took him away by death. Also Mr. William Brewster…"

It was the preaching of Clyfton and the inspiration he provided to Brewster and Bradford that launched the "Pilgrim adventure." Sometime in the 1590s, Clyfton began to preach dissenting religious views and to conduct services using prayers that were not in the authorised Book of Common Prayer. He soon drew an audience from the surrounding towns and villages. Brewster, living six or seven miles away in Scrooby, heard Clyfton preach. Brewster joined Clyfton's Babworth congregation. Several years later, around 1602, young William Bradford, who was living in Austerfield (some ten miles from Babworth), also, according to Cotton Mather "came to enjoy Mr. Richard Clifton's illuminating ministry." The path from Bradford’s home in Austerfield to the church in Babworth went by Brewster’s home in Scrooby. The two men—Bradford an intellectual teenager and Brewster a settled older family man—walked together and undoubtedly learned each other's minds and characters.

== Works ==
At Amsterdam Clyfton was engaged in several bitter controversies. Having renounced the principles of rigid separation he became one of the most violent adversaries of John Smyth, and published, A Plea for Infants and elder People concerning their Baptisme. Or a Processe of the Passages between M. Iohn Smyth and Richard Clifton, Amsterdam, 1610. He also wrote An Advertisement concerning a book lately published by Christopher Lawne and others, against the Exiled English Church at Amsterdam, 1612. The book attacked is The prophane Schism of the Brownists or Separatists, with the impiety, dissensions, lewd and abominable vices of that impure Sect, discovered, 1612. Henry Ainsworth published An Animadversion to Mr. Richard Clyftons Advertisement, Amsterdam, 1613.

== Notes ==
- This article incorporates text from a publication now in the public domain: "Clifton, Richard". Dictionary of National Biography. London: Smith, Elder & Co. 1885–1900.
