= Scrooby Congregation =

Protestant separatists from Nottinghamshire, England

The Scrooby Congregation was an English Protestant separatist church near Scrooby, on the outskirts of Bawtry, a small market town at the border of Yorkshire, Lincolnshire and Nottinghamshire. In 1607/1608 the congregation emigrated to the Netherlands in search of the freedom to worship without conforming to the Church of England. They founded the "English separatist church at Leiden", one of several English separatist groups in the Dutch Republic at the time.

== In Scrooby ==
Richard Clyfton was rector of All Saints' Church, Babworth, near Retford, from 1586. He lost his position as rector of Babworth through deprivation in 1605 under suspicion of nonconformity. Suspended, he continued to preach at Bawtry, near Scrooby though over the county boundary in Yorkshire. From 1606 the congregation around Clyfton met in the house of William Brewster. This manor house has been identified as on the site of the former Scrooby Palace of the archbishops of York, though much of the older building had been demolished by then. In 1607 Clyfton was excommunicated.

John Robinson from Sturton le Steeple, also in northern Nottinghamshire, had lost his pulpit for his views and returned home by about the end of 1604; he made contact with Dissenters in Gainsborough, just over the eastern county boundary in Lincolnshire, as well as Scrooby. John Smyth became the minister of the Gainsborough Dissenters. In this way the two separatist churches were drawn together, with Robinson assuming authority in the Scrooby congregation alongside Clyfton after a process of ordination.

Members of the congregation included William Bradford, William Brewster and his wife Mary Brewster.

== Emigration ==
From the end of 1607 and into 1608, the Gainsborough and Scrooby Dissenters emigrated to Holland, in waves. An organiser of the move was Thomas Helwys, lawyer and Puritan leader of the Gainsborough Congregation led by Smyth, who had moved away to Basford, Nottinghamshire, before coming to attention for not taking Communion. The emigrants went to Amsterdam and Leiden.

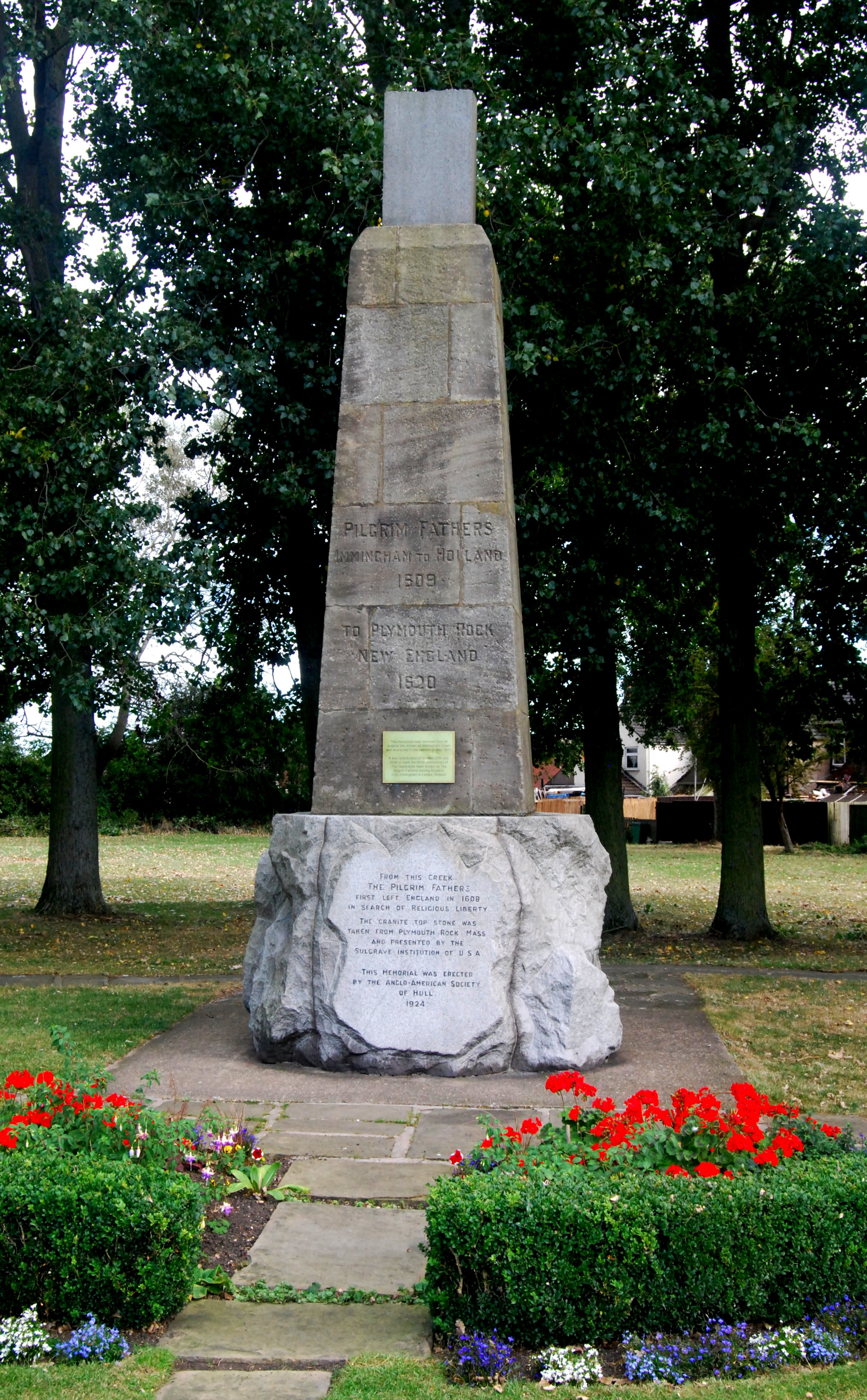
Memorial to the departure of congregation members for Holland in 1609, at Immingham on the southern bank of the Humber estuary

== In Leiden ==
After arriving at Holland they realised that as foreigners, they could only take unskilled jobs and were exempt from working organisations. The congregation also noticed that their children were growing up more Dutch than English. The congregation decided to emigrate to the Americas, where their children could be English, and they could worship freely.

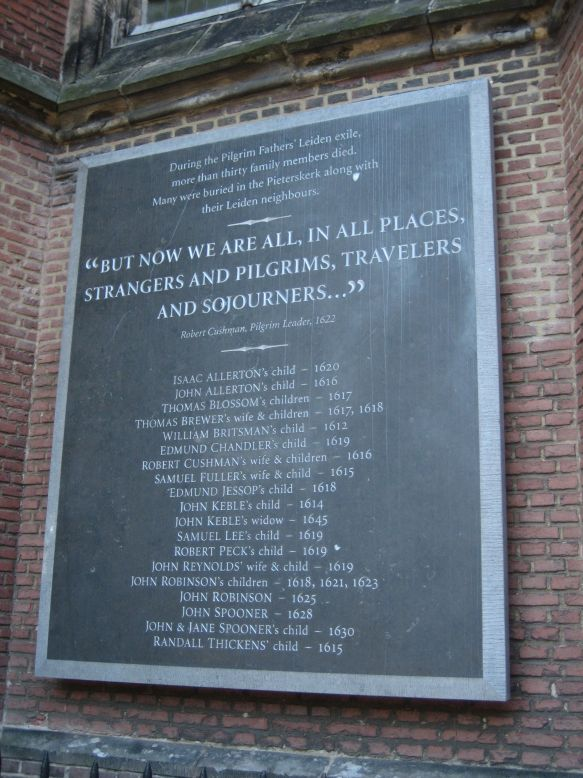
Memorial to congregation members, Pieterskerk, Leiden

== Historiography ==
The significance of the village of Scrooby for the Pilgrim group which left Leiden for the new world is still debated. The first research on the congregation was published by the antiquarian Joseph Hunter in 1849. It was followed in 1853 by a popular book from William Henry Bartlett, a topographical artist. Henry Morton Dexter wrote the authoritative account The England and Holland of the Pilgrims (1905). Further documentary evidence was found by Walter Herbert Burgess (1867–1943) and Ronald Marchant. See also Sandra Goodall, "Beyond Bradford's Journal: The Scrooby Puritans in Context," Ph.D. Dissertation, August 2015, Arizona State University.

== See also ==
- Pilgrims (Plymouth Colony)
