= Listed buildings in Scrooby =

Scrooby is a civil parish in the Bassetlaw District of Nottinghamshire, England. The parish contains 17 listed buildings that are recorded in the National Heritage List for England. Of these, one is listed at Grade II*, the middle of the three grades, and the others are at Grade II, the lowest grade. The parish contains the village of Scooby and the surrounding countryside, and the listed buildings include houses, cottages and associated structures, churches, farmhouses and farm buildings, a former watermill, a pinfold, a war memorial, and a telephone kiosk.

== Key ==
Grade	Criteria
II*	Particularly important buildings of more than special interest
II	Buildings of national importance and special interest

== Buildings ==
Name and location	Photograph	Date	Notes	Grade
St Wilfrid's Church; 53.40961°N 1.02042°W		15th century	The church has been altered and extended through the centuries, and it was restored in 1864. It is built in stone with slate roofs, and consists of a nave, a south aisle and chapel, a south porch, a chancel and a west steeple. The steeple has a tower with two stages, a string course, an arched west window with three lights and a hood mould, two-light arched bell openings, and an embattled parapet with corner crocketed pinnacles. The angles of the parapet are chamfered and have small diagonal buttresses, rising to an octagonal spire with a weather vane. The body of the church also has embattled parapets.	II*
Manor House Farmhouses; 53.41119°N 1.01745°W		16th century	Originally a moated palace occupied by Archbishops of York, it has been largely demolished, later extended and used as a farmhouse, and then divided into two cottages. It is in red brick and stone, on a plinth with a chamfered course above, and has dentilled eaves, and a half-hipped pantile roof. There are two storeys and seven bays, the right bay projecting slightly, and a rear outshut. On the front are a doorway, and a canted bay window. Most of the windows are casements, some in segmental aches, and there is a 16th-century mullioned window with two arched lights and a quoined surround.	II
The Old Vicarage; 53.40972°N 1.02107°W		Early 17th century (probable)	The house has a ground floor in red brick with a blue brick band at the base, the upper floor is timber framed with plaster infill, and there is a pantile roof with stone coped gables and kneelers. There are two storeys and two bays, one long and the other shorter, a lean-to on the right, and a single-storey two-bay rear extension. Most of the windows are horizontally-sliding sashes.	II
Barn, Holmefield Farm; 53.41086°N 1.02150°W		17th century	The barn has a timber framed core, it was encased in red brick in the 19th century, and has a pantile roof with a brick coped left gable. It contains a two-storey doorway, vents and a fixed light. Attached to the barn is a single-storey lean-to containing a doorway with a segmental head, and projecting from it is a single-storey wing.	II
Monk's Mill and wall 53.41190°N 1.02187°W		17th century	A watermill, later a house and outbuildings, in red brick and stone, with dentilled eaves and pantile roofs, consisting of a row of buildings with different heights. On the right is a block with two storeys and an attic and three bays, to its right is a wing with two storeys and four bays, to its left is a two-storey three-bay wing, to the left is a two-storey two-bay wing, and finally a single-storey single-bay wing. The windows are a mix of casements, horizontally-sliding sashes and fixed lights. In front of the mill is a brick wall with stone coping containing three mill races with two brick arches and cutwaters.	II
Scrooby Top House; 53.39325°N 1.01808°W		Early 18th century	Originally a staging post on the Great North Road, later a house and a restaurant, it is in rendered red brick on a stone plinth, with sill and floor bands, and a hipped pantile roof. There are three storeys, five bays, and flanking two-storey two-bay wings, the left with a pantile roof, and the right with a slate roof. In the centre is a doorway with attached Doric columns, an entablature, and a traceried semicircular fanlight with a keystone. The windows are sashes, in the ground floor with splayed lintels and keystones, and those in the middle floor and the central window in the top floor with keystones.	II
Holmefield Farmhouse; 53.41070°N 1.02162°W		Mid 18th century	The farmhouse is in red brick, with dentilled eaves, and a pantile roof with stone coped gables and kneelers. There are two storeys and a main range of three bays, and to the right is a lower two-storey single-bay wing with a lean-to. The central doorway has a fanlight, and the windows are casements.	II
Mill House; 53.41087°N 1.02037°W		Mid 18th century	A house in red brick, the gables rendered, with a floor band, dogtooth eaves and a pantile roof. There are two storeys, three bays, and rear extensions. In the centre is a doorway, above which is a blocked window, and flanking the doorway are canted bay windows, above which are sash windows. All the openings are under segmental arches.	II
Scrooby Top Cottages and attached buildings 53.39346°N 1.01809°W		Mid 18th century	A row of cottages and former stables in red brick with dentilled eaves and pantile roofs. In the centre is a two-storey three-bay cottage with a pyramidal roof. This contains a floor band, a central a blocked arch with impost blocks flanked by pilasters, above which is a round panel. The windows are horizontally-sliding sashes under segmental arches. To the left is a lower range with two storeys and five bays, containing a blocked arch with impost blocks and sash windows, those in the ground floor with segmental heads. To the right is a single-storey stable block containing doorways of different sizes, a blocked arch, and a casement window under a segmental arch.	II
Bishopfield House; 53.39097°N 1.02987°W		Late 18th century	A stuccoed house on a plinth, with moulded floor and sill bands, corner pilasters, an eaves band, and a hipped slate roof with overhanding eaves on brackets. There are two storeys and a front of three bays, the middle bay projecting slightly, and recessed to the left is a wing with a single storey and an attic, and three bays in painted brick. In the centre of the main block is a porch with paired Doric columns and a doorway with a moulded surround and a traceried fanlight. Most of the windows are sashes. The garden front has four bays and a four-bay verandah with a decorative fascia on seven iron columns.	II
Low Farmhouse; 53.41048°N 1.01979°W		Late 18th century	The farmhouse is in red brick with a floor band, dogtooth and dentilled eaves and a pantile roof. There are two storeys and attics, and three bays. In the centre is a porch, and the windows are sashes with splayed lintels. At the rear is a lean-to, and a wing with two storeys and five bays containing a porch, and a doorway, a sash window and a horizontally-sliding sash window, the last three under segmental arches. Inside the rear wing is an inglenook fireplace.	II
Pigeoncote, Manor Farm; 53.41117°N 1.01792°W		Late 18th century	The pigeoncote is in red brick with some render and stone, and has dentilled eaves and a corrugated roof. At the gable end is a dentilled cornice forming a pediment in which is an arched opening with a wooden panel containing three pigeonholes. External steps lead to an upper floor doorway under a segmental arch, and in the east front is an opening under a segmental arch containing a fanlight.	II
Barn range and pigeoncote, Low Farm; 53.41074°N 1.01970°W		Early 19th century	The farm buildings are in red brick with dentilled eaves and pantile roofs. They consist of a two-storey barn, beyond which are two-storey and lower outbuildings, and a pigeoncote projecting at right angles with two storeys and an attic. The openings in the barns and outbuildings include doorways, some under segmental arches, and vents. The pigeoncote contains various openings, and in the attic is a gabled dormer with pigeonholes. Inside, there are nesting boxes.	II
Scrooby Methodist Church; 53.41008°N 1.02106°W		1829–30	The church is in painted and rendered brick with a hipped slate roof. There is a single storey and three bays. In the centre is a flat-roofed porch containing a doorway with a segmental head and a fanlight, and in the outer bays are arched sash windows. To the left is a lower extension in painted brick, and to the right is a rendered and coped wall, both with arched doorways.	II
War memorial 53.40961°N 1.02008°W		1920	The war memorial in the churchyard of St Wilfrid's Church is in polished grey granite. It consists of a broken column on a tapering plinth, on a two-stage square base, on a single-step base. On the memorial is an inscription and the names of those lost in the First World War.	II
Telephone kiosk 53.41023°N 1.02137°W		1935	The K6 type telephone kiosk in Chapel Lane was designed by Giles Gilbert Scott. Constructed in cast iron with a square plan and a dome, it has three unperforated crowns in the top panels.	II
Churchyard wall and pinfold 53.40966°N 1.02004°W		Undated	The east and north sides of the churchyard of St Wilfrid's Church are enclosed by a stone coped wall with some brick infill. On the east side is a double wrought iron gate flanked by stone piers with shaped coping, and on the north side is a wooden gate with small wooden piers. Projecting from the northwest is the village pinfold with a stone wall containing a wooden gate and piers.	II
