= Forefathers' Day =

Annual holiday in Plymouth, Massachusetts, US

Forefathers' Day is a holiday celebrated in Plymouth, Massachusetts, on December 22. It is a commemoration of the landing of the Pilgrim Fathers in Plymouth, Massachusetts, on December 21, 1620. It was introduced in Plymouth, Massachusetts, in 1769.

Forefathers Day' is celebrated every year by the Old Colony Club, established in 1769 "to honor the forefathers". The celebration begins at 6:00 AM with a march by members to the top of Cole's Hill next to Massasoit's statue, followed by a reading of a proclamation honoring the forefathers and a ritual firing of the club's cannon.

The Old Colony Club and the Mayflower Society both include a succotash dinner as part of their celebration. Sauquetash was recorded as a part of the first Thanksgiving. Unlike later versions of succotash, in Plymouth succotash is served as a broth containing large pieces of fowl and meat that are sliced at the table.

When the 22nd falls on a Sunday, the Old Colony Club celebrates Forefathers Day' on the following Monday.

There is some good-hearted dispute between the Old Colony Club and the Mayflower Society. The simple fact of the celebration falling on separate days permits members of both societies to participate in both celebrations. In adjusting the date to the Gregorian calendar, the anniversary was erroneously established on December 22 instead of December 21.
