= The Depraved =

The Depraved may refer to:

- Adélaïde (film), also known as The Depraved, a 1968 French drama film
- The Depraved (1957 film), a British crime film
- The Depraved a.k.a. Urban Explorer, a 2011 German horror film

Depraved may refer to:

- Depraved: The Shocking True Story of America's First Serial Killer, American true crime book by Harold Schechter about the murders of H.H. Holmes

== See also ==
- Depravity
