= Listed buildings in Babworth =

Babworth is a civil parish in the Bassetlaw District of Nottinghamshire, England. The parish contains 21 listed buildings that are recorded in the National Heritage List for England. Of these, one is listed at Grade I, the highest of the three grades, one is at Grade II*, the middle grade, and the others are at Grade II, the lowest grade. The parish contains the villages of Babworth and Ranby, and is otherwise rural. The listed buildings include three country houses, their lodges and associated structures. The other listed buildings are a church, houses and cottages, a public house, a canal bridge, a commemorative stone, and a war memorial.

== Key ==
Grade	Criteria
I	Buildings of exceptional interest, sometimes considered to be internationally important
II*	Particularly important buildings of more than special interest
II	Buildings of national importance and special interest

== Buildings ==
Name and location	Photograph	Date	Notes	Grade
All Saints' Church, Babworth; 53.32018°N 0.97113°W		15th century	The church has been altered and extended through the centuries, including a restoration in 1859–62, and a further restoration in 1877–78 by J. Loughborough Pearson. It is built in stone with slate roofs, and consists of a nave, a north aisle, a south porch, a chancel, a north vestry, and a west tower. The tower has two stages, diagonal buttresses, a three-light west window, a clock face on the south side, and a string course, above which are two-light bell openings, two gargoyles, and an embattled parapet with corner crocketed pinnacles. Most of the body of the church also has embattled parapets and crocketed pinnacles.	I
Rushey Inn Cottages; 53.31143°N 0.98955°W		Early 18th century	An inn, later three cottages, the building is in red brick with a floor band, dentilled eaves, and a pantile roof with coped gables and kneelers. There is an L-shaped plan, with a central range of two storeys and two bays, flanking projecting gabled wings with two storeys and attics, a lean-to on the right with a doorway, and a six-bay rear wing. In the centre is a pair of doorways and the windows are casement; all the openings have segmental heads.	II
Babworth Hall; 53.32092°N 0.96924°W		18th century	A country house that has been altered, it is in red brick and stone, on a plinth, with floor bands, a moulded cornice, a parapet, and slate roofs, hipped on the left wing, and pyramidal on the right wing. The central block has two storeys and attics and five bays, and is flanked by projecting three-storey single-bay wings with quoins. The central doorway has Doric pilasters, a fluted surround with paterae, a traceried fanlight, and a pediment. The windows are sashes in lugged architraves. In front of the house are orbs, and flanking the doorway are urns on stone blocks.	II
Barn and stable block, Ranby Hall; 53.34021°N 1.01868°W	—	18th century	The farm buildings are in brick, partly rendered and stone, with hipped pantile roofs. The barn has two storeys and a loft and contains a central doorway with a segmental arch, and blocked slit vents. Projecting to the right is a wing with two storeys and eleven bays containing doorways, stable doors and casement windows.	II
Ranby House School; 53.32217°N 1.01636°W	—	18th century	A country house later used as a school, most of it dating from about 1910. It is in red brick and red sandstone with some yellow brick, and slate roofs with coped gables and kneelers. The later part is on a plinth, with quoins and floor bands. The south front has two storeys and attics, and three gabled bays. The outer bays project slightly and contain two-storey bay windows, above which is a three-light mullioned window. In the middle bay is a single-storey bay window, over which is a mullioned and transomed window, and a sundial in the gable. The west front has ten bays, dentilled eaves and an embattled parapet. It contains a single-storey three-bay porch, and a single-storey bay window. In the earlier part are bow windows.	II
Ranby Hall; 53.34014°N 1.01804°W		Late 18th century	A country house, possibly with an earlier core, in stone and rendered brick with slate roofs, and an L-shaped plan. The south, garden, front has two storeys and attics, and seven bays. The middle three bays project and have a floor band, four Doric pilasters, an entablature with triglyphs, and a pediment. The east front also has two storeys and attics, seven bays, and a pediment. In the centre is a Doric porch and a doorway with a fanlight, and the windows in both fronts are sashes. Elsewhere, there are further extensions.	II*
Garden terrace, Ranby Hall; 53.33992°N 1.01813°W	—	Late 18th century	To the south of the hall are two terraces enclosed by rendered brick walls with stone coping, each containing brick piers, stone orbs, and a wooden door. At the angles are urns with festoons, and between the terraces is a flight of seven steps flanked by piers with flower containers. The east side of the lower terrace bows out.	II
The Lodge; 53.33280°N 1.02748°W	—	c. 1800	The lodge is stuccoed, on a plinth, with dentilled eaves and a pantile roof, hipped on the right. There are two storeys and three bays, the left two bays projecting under a pyramidal roof, and a single-storey single-bay extension on the left with a hipped roof. The doorway has a plain surround, the windows are horizontally-sliding sashes, and in the west wall is a canted bay window on brackets.	II
The Money Stone; 53.31091°N 1.02000°W	—	1802	A commemorative stone in Morton Park marking the place where Roman coins were found. It is a square stone 1 metre (3 ft 3 in) high with a shaped top and an inscribed plaque.	II
Centre Lodge; 53.32114°N 1.01721°W	—	c. 1820	A lodge, later two cottages, in rendered brick, with overhanging eaves and a hipped slate roof. There are two storeys and four bays. The windows are casements.	II
Ranby Lodge; 53.32097°N 1.01725°W		c. 1820	The lodge is in rendered stone, with a lean-to in rendered brick on the right, overhanging eaves, and a hipped slate roof. There are two storeys and two bays, and the windows are casements.	II
Stable Block, Babworth Hall; 53.32174°N 0.96968°W	—	Early 19th century	The stable block is in stone and red brick on a stone plinth, and the roofs are slated. It has a quadrangle plan with a cottage on the east; the cottage has a single storey and an attic, and otherwise there is a single storey. The west front has eight bays and contains six carriage doorways and single doorways with fanlights, all with rusticated surrounds and keystones, and in the centre is a clock. Elsewhere, most of the openings have rusticated wedge lintels.	II
Chequers Inn and outbuildings 53.32120°N 1.02409°W		Early 19th century	The public house is in red brick with stone dressings and a hipped slate roof. There are two storeys and three bays. In the centre is a protruding porch containing a doorway with a fanlight, and the windows are sashes with wedge lintels. Attached to the left is an outbuilding in stone with a pantile roof, containing a doorway and casement windows.	II
Chequerhouse Bridge; 53.32371°N 1.02659°W		Early 19th century (probable)	This is bridge No. 51, carrying Old Blyth Road over the Chesterfield Canal. It is in brick with squared stone coping, and consists of a single semi-elliptical arch. There are springing stones to the arch, and the swept wings end in piers.	II
Hall Farmhouse; 53.34018°N 1.01905°W	—	Early 19th century	The farmhouse is in red brick, partly rendered and painted, with dentilled eaves, and a hipped slate roof with red ridge tiles. There are two storeys and three bays, and to the left is an extension with a single storey and an attic and two bays. The doorway has a fanlight, the windows are sashes, and all the openings have segmental heads.	II
Little Morton Farmhouse; 53.30238°N 0.98626°W		Early 19th century	The farmhouse is in red brick with stone dressings, a moulded cornice, and a hipped pantile roof. There are two storeys and attics, and three bays. The central doorway has a surround of piers with extended capitals and a projecting hood, and has a segmental fanlight. The doorway is flanked by canted bay windows with parapets, and the upper floors contain sash windows with segmental heads. To the right is a single-storey single-bay extension, and at the rear are later extensions.	II
The Barracks; 53.33183°N 1.02735°W		c. 1830	A group of six cottages, later combined into one house, it is in red brick with stone dressings, and a tile roof with stone coped gables and kneelers. There are two storeys, a front of three gabled bays, the outer wings projecting slightly, and a right cross-wing. In the centre is a gabled porch containing an arched entrance with voussoirs, and an arched doorway with a fanlight. The windows are mullioned casements, in the middle gable is a decorative stone shield, and the outer gables contain arrow slits.	II
Outbuilding, The Barracks; 53.33188°N 1.02697°W		c. 1830	The outbuilding is in brick with pantile roofs. It is in one and two storeys, and has seven bays. The building contains doorways with plain surrounds and casement windows, and all the openings have segmental arches.	II
Babworth Rectory; 53.31928°N 0.97175°W	—	Early to mid 19th century	The rectory, later used for other purposes, is in stuccoed brick, and has slate roofs with coped gables and bargeboards. The south front has two storeys and an attic, four bays, a protruding cross-wing, and a two-storey canted bay window with a conical roof and a finial. In the centre is a doorway with a fanlight, and to the left of the front is a two-storey five-sided bay window. In the gable end of the cross-wing is a bow window, and on the cross-wing is a two-storey bowed bay window. Attached to the house is the former game larder that has a polygonal bay and a conical roof. The windows in the house are sashes.	II
Morton Hall Lodge; 53.31466°N 1.02842°W	—	Mid 19th century	The lodge to the former Morton Hall, now demolished, is in red and blue brick with stone dressings, on a plinth, and has a hipped slate roof with decorative ridge tiles. There is a single storey and attics, and a front of two bays. In the left bay is a timber gabled open porch with a slate roof. Above it is a two-light casement window with a mullion, over which is a small round window, and a coped gable with kneelers and orb finials. On the west front is a similar gable, and below it is a canted bay window.	II
Ranby War Memorial; 53.31957°N 1.02464°W		1920	The war memorial is in the churchyard of St Matin's Church, and is in limestone. It consists of a cross with the Crucifixion of Jesus carved in relief, standing on a low plinth on a square stone base. On the plinth and the base are inscriptions and the names of those lost in the First World War.	II
