= Babworth =

Coordinates: 53.31°N 00.98°W

- Village and Civil parish
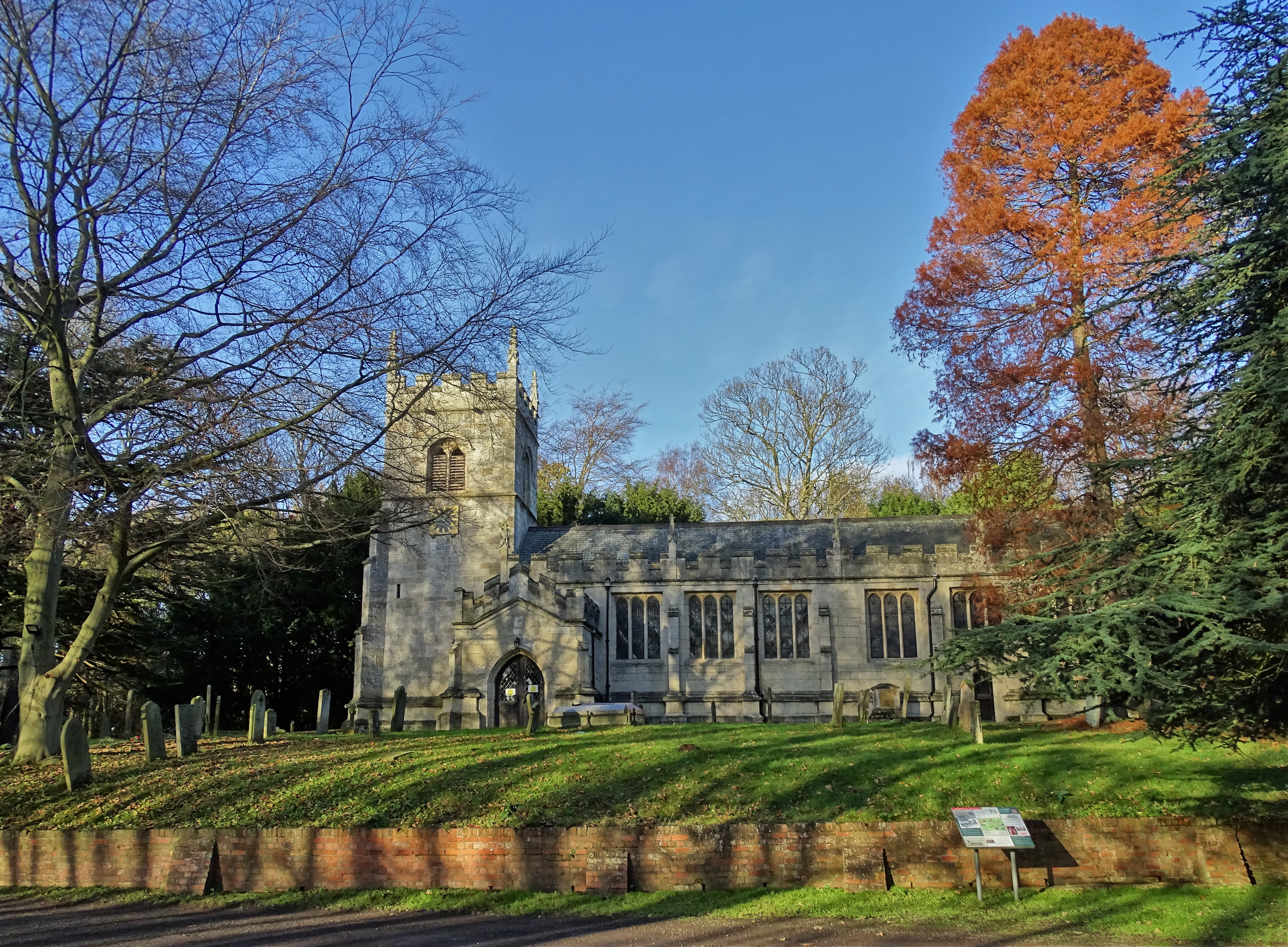
- All Saints Church

- Location within Nottinghamshire
- Interactive map of Babworth
- Area: 9.90 sq mi (25.6 km^{2})
- Population: 1,489 (2021)
  - Density: 150/sq mi (58/km^{2})
- OS grid reference: SK6880
  - London: 130 mi (210 km) SE
- District: Bassetlaw
- Shire county: Nottinghamshire
- Region: East Midlands
- Country: England
- Sovereign state: United Kingdom
- Places: Babworth, Ranby
- Post town: RETFORD
- Postcode district: DN22
- Dialling code: 01777
- Police: Nottinghamshire
- Fire: Nottinghamshire
- Ambulance: East Midlands
- UK Parliament: Bassetlaw
- Website: www.babworthparish council.org.uk

Babworth is a village and civil parish in the Bassetlaw district of Nottinghamshire, England, about 2 miles west of Retford. According to the 2001 census the parish had a population of 1,329, rising to 1,687 at the 2011 Census, but dropping to 1,489 in 2021. In addition to the village of Babworth, the parish also includes Ranby.

== History ==
Prior to 1066 (the Norman Conquest) Babworth (Babvrde) is known to have belonged substantially to Earl Tosti and was part of the king's manor of Bodmeschell. Tax was paid for six and a half bovats of land. It is also said that Ulmer also held two and a half borate.

After the Norman Conquest, Roger de Busli bought the whole of it and delivered it "by feudal tenure" to Goisfrid. In the Domesday Book of 1086 it is certified to be one carucate and a half, with a border; pasture wood two quarents long, and one broad, which before the Conquest had been valued at 40s but afterwards was valued at 10s.

According to Nomina Villarum, by 1316 the Earl of Lancaster, and Robert de Saundeby, are certified to have been the lords of it. In 1355, nearly the whole of Babworth became the property of Sir Thomas de Grendon, who sold it in 1368 to Sir William Trusbutt. It was later inherited by Trussbutt's son, Sir Robert, who sold the manor "with its appurtenances" to Sir Richard de Willoughby, of Wollaton. Later it became the property of the Earl of Shrewsbury and Lord Cavendish, and in the 18th century it was purchased by Sir Gervas Elwes, and lastly by John Simpson.

Piercy describes Babworth in the early 19th century as follows: "The parish, which contains the hamlets of Great, and Little Morton, Morton Grange, and Ranby, contains nearly 6000 acres, of excellent forest land, mostly inclosed. The whole of the land in Babworth is the property of the Hon. J. B. Simpson, which he has in his own occupation, and upon which he has erected a steward’s house, and farming buildings, upon a large scale."

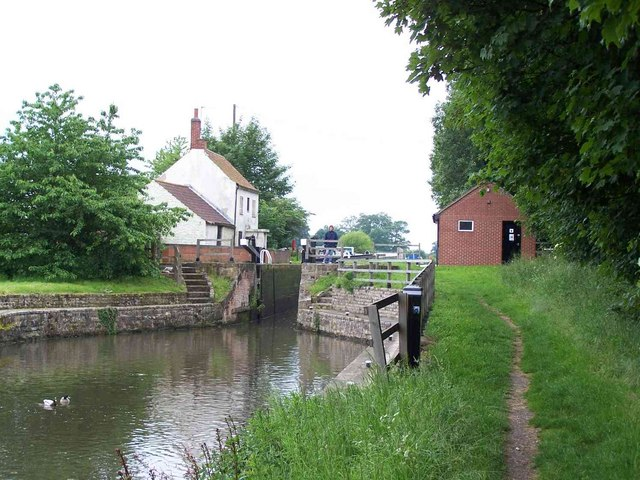
Chesterfield Canal, Babworth

== Babworth Hall ==
Babworth Hall is a Grade II listed eighteenth-century House and Parklands. Babworth Hall itself stands in the southern half of the park and is a three-storey building of red brick and ashlar construction that dates from the mid eighteenth century, with later alterations by Humphry Repton (1752–1818) one of the last great English landscape designers. Babworth Hall represents an example of an early work of Repton's. His proposed alterations for Babworth were included in The Red Book (1790).

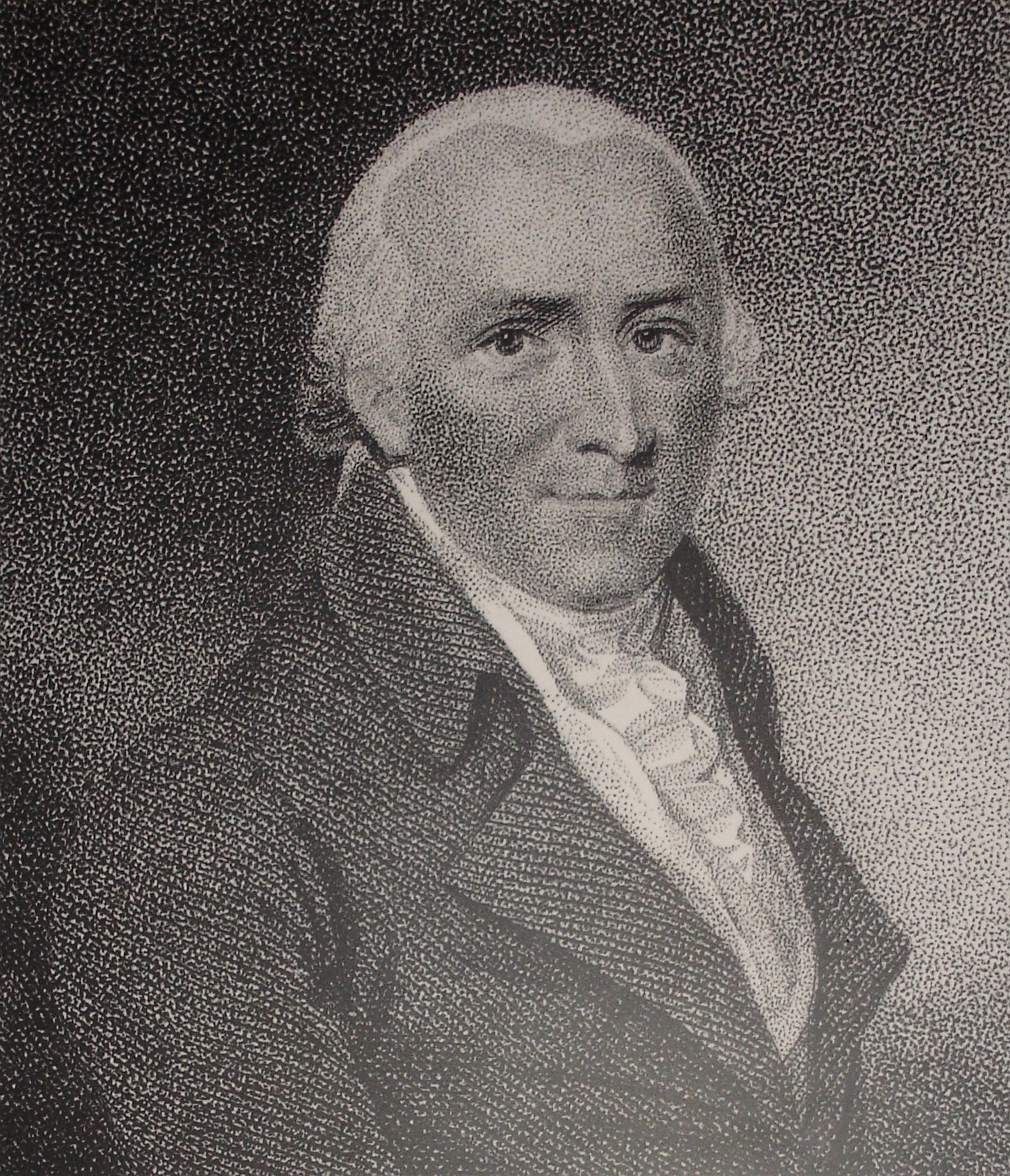
The landscape designer, Humphry Repton

Piercy describes Babworth Hall in the early 19th century as follows:

"Babworth Hall, the seat of the Hon. John Bridgeman Simpson (brother to the late Earl of Bradford) is pleasantly situated on an eminence, a short distance from the Retford and Worksop road, about a mile and a quarter from the former place. Its vicinity contains some of the finest scenery in this part of the county, for which, it is, in a great measure, indebted to its present possessor, who, has lately increased the beauty and interest of the place by a fine piece of water, a swiss cottage, &c. Near the church, is the charming little sequestered residence of the Rev. Archdeacon Eyre, the rector, in which, comfort and elegance are blended; and to whose worthy possessor, added to the kind patronage of the Simpson’s family, the parish is much indebted for its internal prosperity."

— Piercy, John S., The History of Retford in the County of Nottingham (1828)

Leonard Jacks enthuses about the scene from Babworth Hall:

"From one point, close to the house, the eye travels over a bit of open landscape, with a foreground of thriving trees, and further away the crown of gently swelling hills. Looking across the bright and gracefully designed gardens, either from the terrace or from the windows inside, one catches the shimmer of water—of a large and pellucid lake, on the other side of which rises a picturesque bank of sandstone, completely covered with rich foliage, save in one or two places where the red of the sandstone peeps out from the thick mass of leaves and branches, acquiring a still ruddier tint in the light of the summer sun."

— Jacks, Leonard, The Great Houses of Nottinghamshire and the County Families (1881)

The lake mentioned in the landscaping no longer exists having dried up in the 1960s. This has been variously ascribed to a change in the water table or the action of tree roots breaking the clay lining. An article by the Garden History Society describes an afternoon spent in Babworth Hall in the 1960s when the members were informed that the lake had dried up.

"The afternoon was spent at Babworth Hall near Retford where, by kind permission of Sir James and Lady Whittaker members were able to see an early example of the work of Humphrey Repton. The party was allowed to inspect the Red Book, dated 1790, and indeed to carry it around the grounds to follow Repton's scheme in its maturity. The planting is still largely intact but the source of the lake has dried up and the site of the lake is now covered by a plantation of willows. The kitchen gardens with their elaborate heating arrangements follow the Repton layout."

— Quarterly Newsletter of the Garden History Society, No. 8 Summer-Autumn (1968)

The Hall remained in the Bridgeman Simpson family until the late nineteenth century, when it was purchased by Colonel Whitaker. The Hall was a convalescent hospital in the First World War. The Hall and its grounds remain in private ownership.

== Babworth and the Pilgrim Fathers ==
Babworth is well known for its connection with the Pilgrim Fathers – the early settlers of the Plymouth Colony in present-day Massachusetts, USA. Richard Clyfton was parson at All Saints' Church, Babworth between 1586 and 1605 and lived at the then rectory, now the Grade II listed Haygarth House.

Two of his friends were William Brewster and William Bradford, both passengers aboard the Mayflower. The church contains many interesting items recalling the Pilgrim Fathers, including the chalice used by Richard Clyfton for communion services. Bones were discovered in a vault under the north aisle in 1951. Among them was the chalice that Clyfton had used. It is thought it may have been hidden here to save it from being stolen or melted down – possibly at the time of the English Civil War in the mid-17th century.

In the early 20th century Babworth maintained its connections with early American heritage when the Rector was Frank Wilberforce, who was the great-grandson of William Wilberforce who led the campaign to abolish slavery.

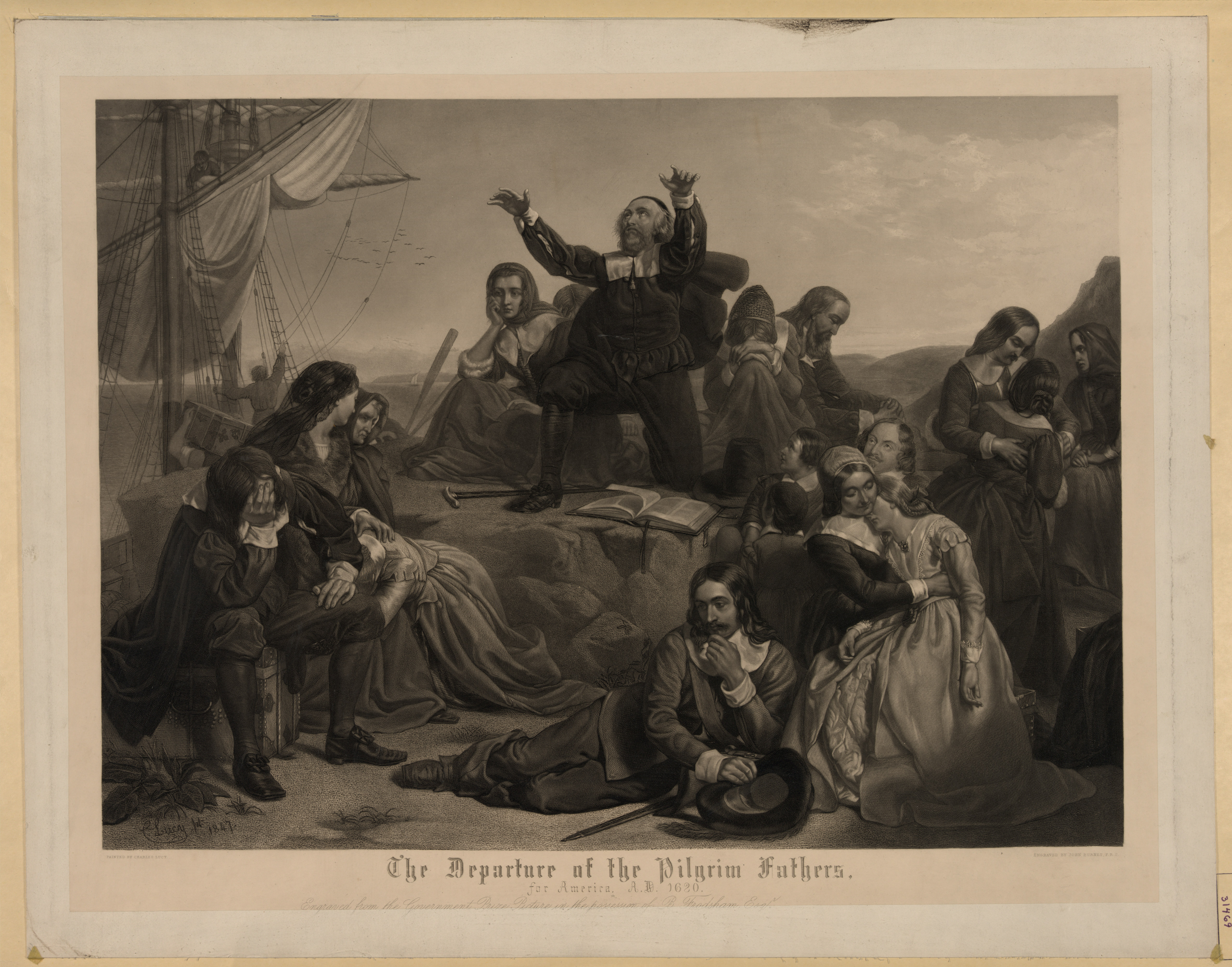
The departure of the Pilgrim Fathers

== Babworth All Saints' Church ==
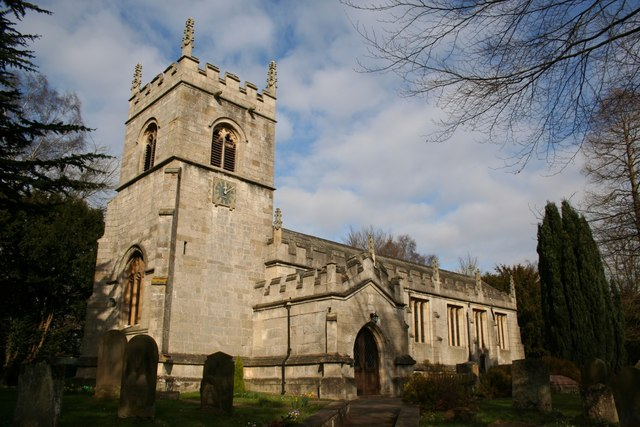
All Saints' Church, Babworth

Babworth parish church, All Saints, is quintessentially English and is surrounded by greenery. The church is around 900 years old. It is a small structure with a tower steeple with three old bells, (to which were added three newly cast bells in the late 1950s) and a clock, a nave, chancel and a porch. Most of the building dates from the 15th century, with several 18th-century memorials and 19th-century stained glass by Charles Eamer Kempe. The chancel and sanctuary contain furniture by Robert (Mousey) Thompson, featuring his trademark mouse carvings. In early spring the church is surrounded by a spectacular display of snowdrops, which the public is free to visit.

According to Piercy, in 1295 the advowson of Babworth church was the property of Robert de Swillington, "who had free warren in Babworth". In 1365 after Swillington's death, it became the property of Sir Thomas de Grendon, who sold it to Sir William Trussbutt. Trussbutt is said to have presented it to the priory of Newstead in Lincolnshire, having first obtained the king's licence, and the licence of Sir Thomas de Saundby to do so. Newstead Priory remained in possession of the church until 1531, when the prior of Newstead, John Blake, granted it and one acre of land to John Hercy, of Grove for the sum of fifteen pounds. In 1674 it became the property of the Wortleys, from whom it was purchased by John Simpson.

Piercy describes the church favourably as "a small but handsome structure of stone, advantageously situated on a rising ground. It consists of tower steeple, with three bells, and clock, a nave and chancel uniform in their windows, height, and battlements, with a side aisle and vestry, and a handsome porch. The whole is of the later period of the Gothic architecture. The little burial plot which surrounds it, is considerably elevated, being connected with, or rather enclosed within the elegant pleasure grounds of the adjacent buildings; while the fine trees, aged and bowery, enhance materially the charming effect of the ivy-mantled tower."

== Geography ==
The Apleyhead (Five Lane Ends) roundabout junction was remodelled in October 2007. Bridges were fabricated by Fairfield-Mabey, weighing around 550 tonnes each. The bridges were fitted into place by Mammoet of the Netherlands, with a self-propelled modular transporter (SPMT). Many motorway bridges in the UK are built by Mabey Bridge.

== Babworth Rovers ==
Babworth has a junior football (soccer) club called Babworth Rovers FC. Many of the players live in Retford and neighbouring villages.

== See also ==
- Listed buildings in Babworth
