= Old Colony Club =

Gentlemen's club in Plymouth, Massachusetts, U.S.

Coordinates: 41°57′27.7″N 70°39′57.2″W

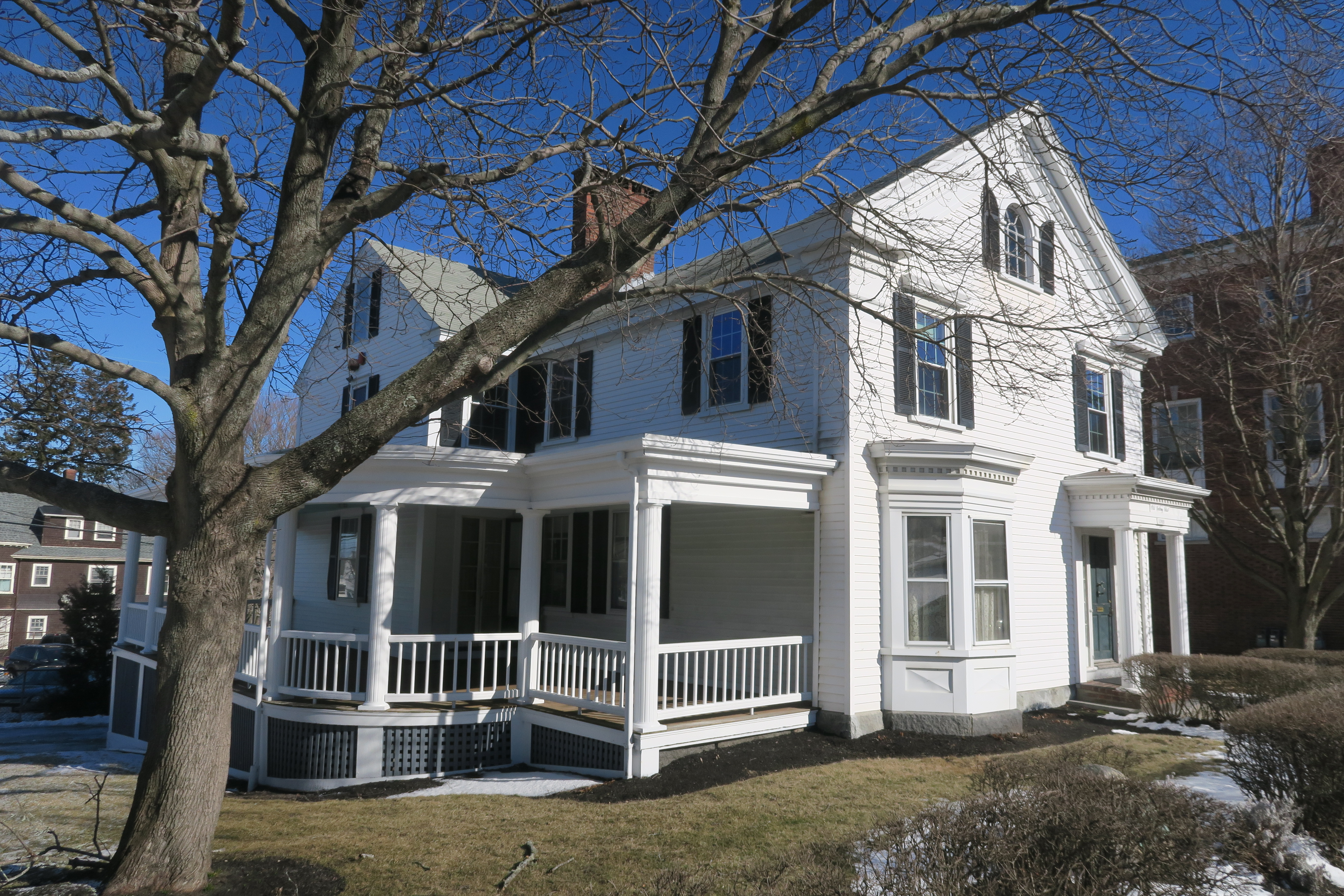
Old Colony Club

The Old Colony Club is one of the oldest gentlemen's clubs in the United States, founded in 1769 in Plymouth, Massachusetts. It is registered as a 501(c)7 non-profit social organization. In 2025, it claimed total revenue of $199,399 and total assets of 199,778.

== History ==
The club was founded in January 1769, by Isaac Lothrop, Pelham Winslow, Thomas Lothrop, Thomas Mayhew, Elkanah Cushman, John Thomas, Edward Winslow, Jr. and John Watson. Their intent in creating a private club was to avoid "the many disadvantages and inconveniences that arise from intermixing with the company at the taverns in ... Plymouth." It went moribund during the American Revolution due to a split between Tory and Patriot members, but was revived in 1875. Its clubhouse on Court Street was purchased in 1893.

== Traditions ==
The club meets on Fridays at a much-renovated old colonial house on Court Street in downtown Plymouth. The club is best known for its annual celebration of Forefathers' Day, one of the oldest holidays in America, dating from colonial times.

Hoyle's Official Book of Games notwithstanding, the "extinct" game of Bestia is still played every Friday night at this institution.

The Old Colony Club boasts among its early members Revolutionary War hero General Alexander Scammell.
