= Scrooby =

Village in Nottinghamshire, England

- Village and civil parish
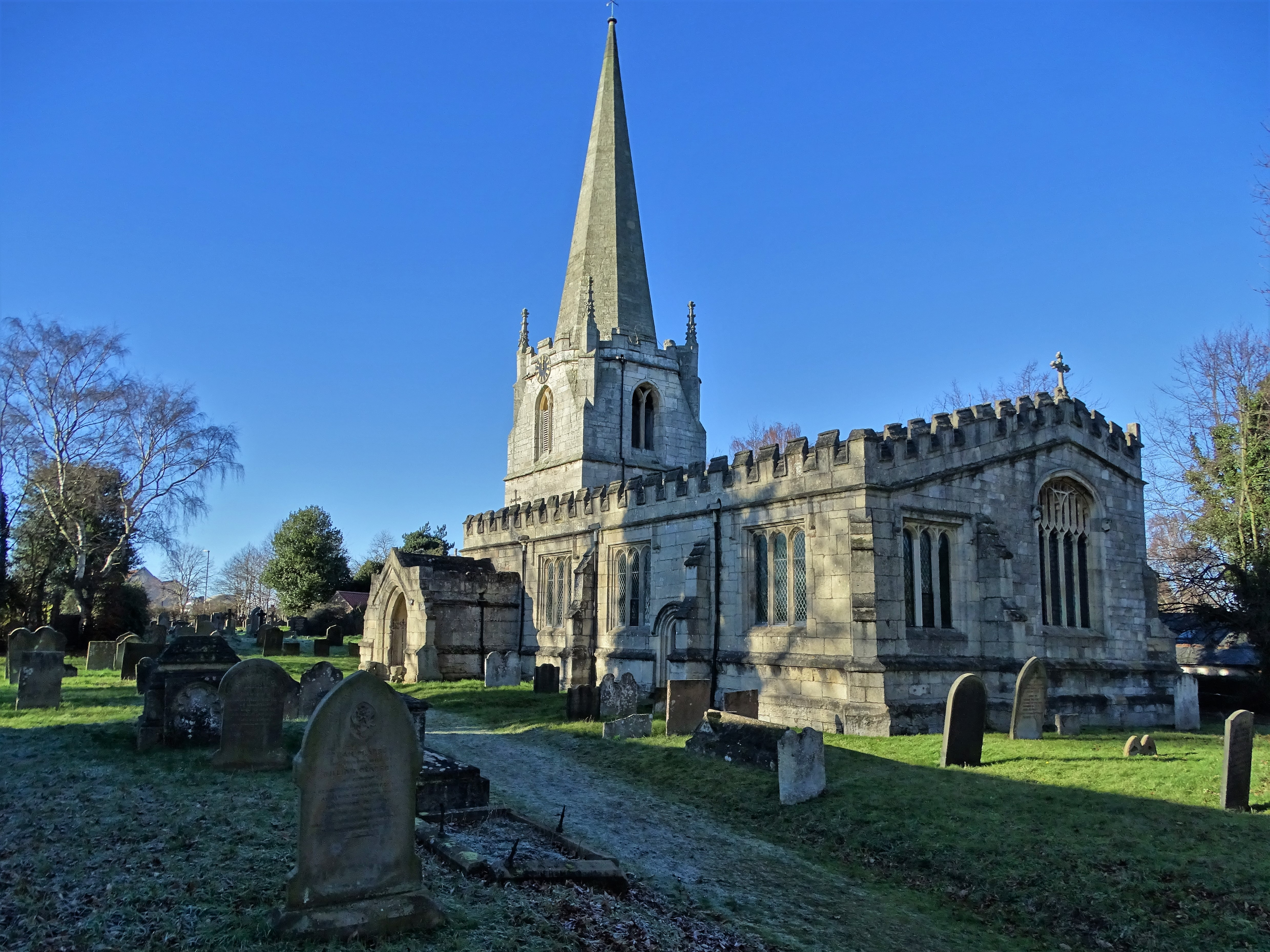
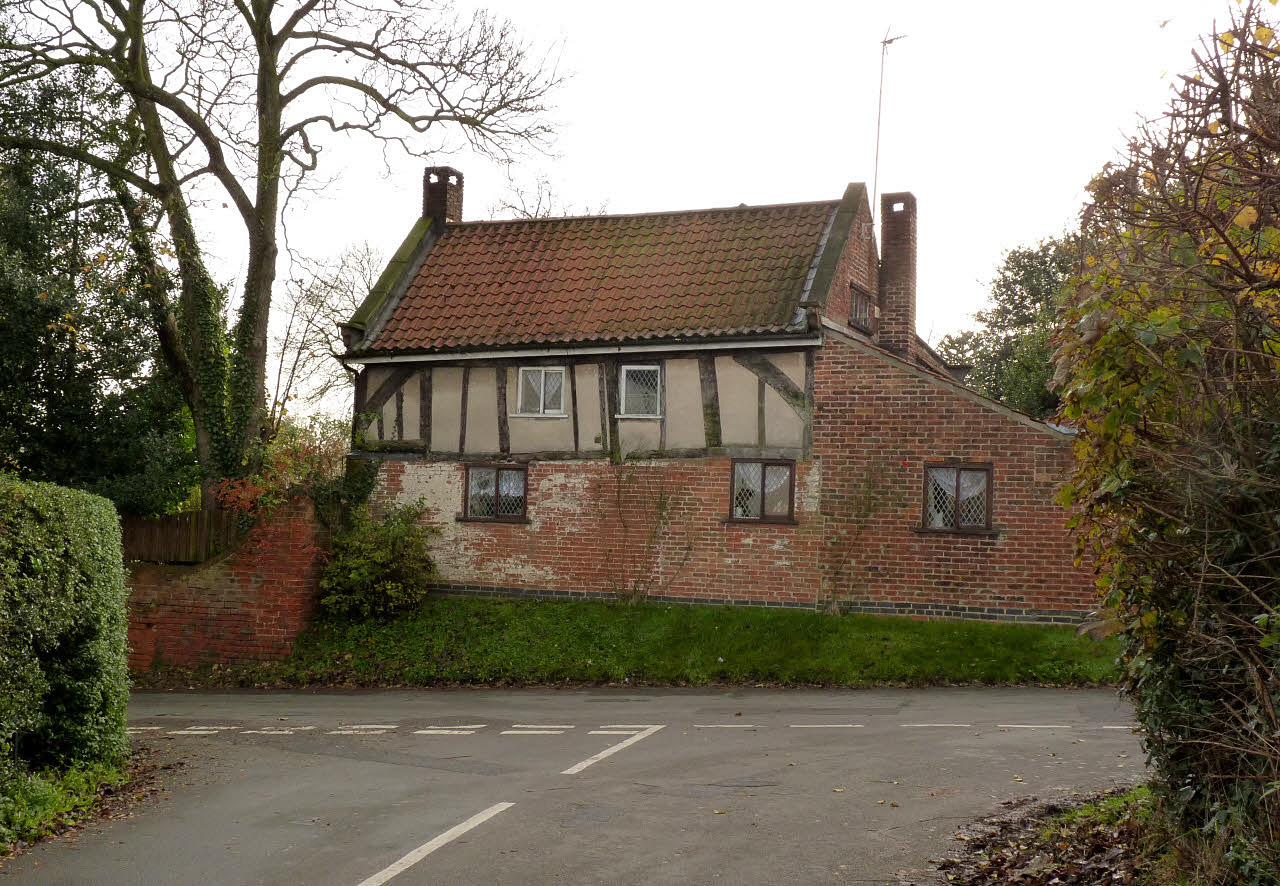
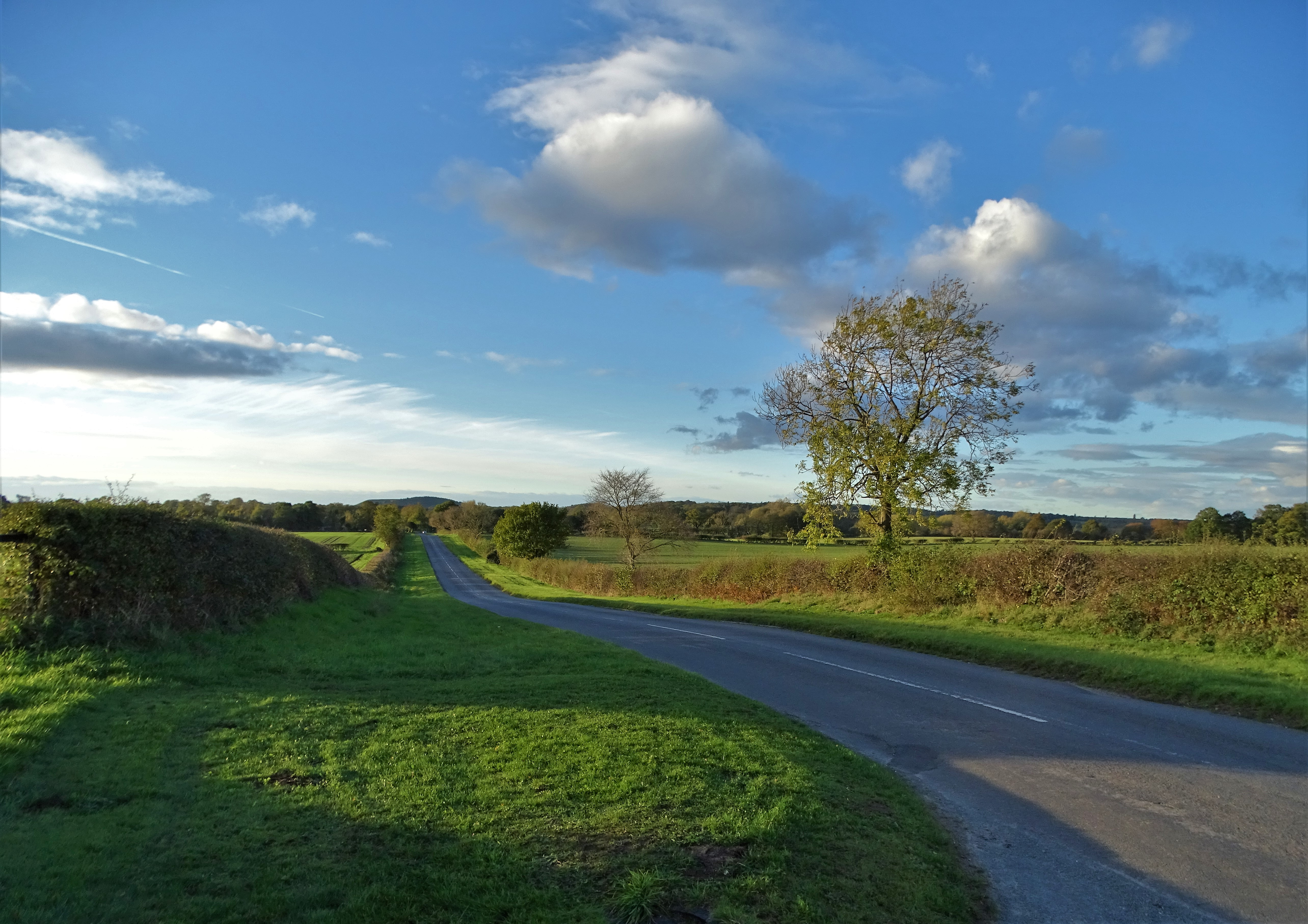
- St Wilfred's Church Old Vicarage Scrooby Top

- Location within Nottinghamshire
- Interactive map of Scrooby
- Area: 2.51 sq mi (6.5 km^{2})
- Population: 307 (2021)
  - Density: 122/sq mi (47/km^{2})
- OS grid reference: SK 652908
  - London: 135 mi (217 km) SSE
- District: Bassetlaw
- Shire county: Nottinghamshire
- Region: East Midlands
- Country: England
- Sovereign state: United Kingdom
- Post town: DONCASTER
- Postcode district: DN10
- Dialling code: 01302
- Police: Nottinghamshire
- Fire: Nottinghamshire
- Ambulance: East Midlands
- UK Parliament: Bassetlaw
- Website: www.scrooby.net

Scrooby is a small village on the River Ryton in the Bassetlaw district of Nottinghamshire, England, near Bawtry in South Yorkshire. At the time of the 2001 census it had a population of 329, in 2011 the count was 315 and by the 2021 census this had fallen further to 307 residents. Until 1766, it was on the Great North Road so became a stopping-off point for numerous important figures including Elizabeth I and Cardinal Wolsey on their journeys. The latter stayed at the Manor House briefly, after his fall from favour.

== History ==
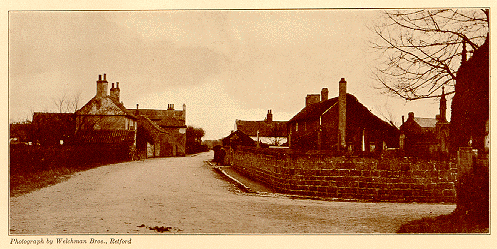
Scrooby village circa 1911

In 958, King Edgar granted an estate including land at Scroppenþorpe, including an area now in the modern Scrooby, to Oscytel, Archbishop of York. The Manor House belonged to the Archbishops of York and so was sometimes referred to as a palace. (A nearby former farmhouse is still called Palace Farm.) At the end of the sixteenth century, the house was occupied by William Brewster, the Archbishop's bailiff, who was also postmaster. His son, also named William Brewster, took that post in the 1590s after a job as an assistant to the Secretary of State under Elizabeth I.

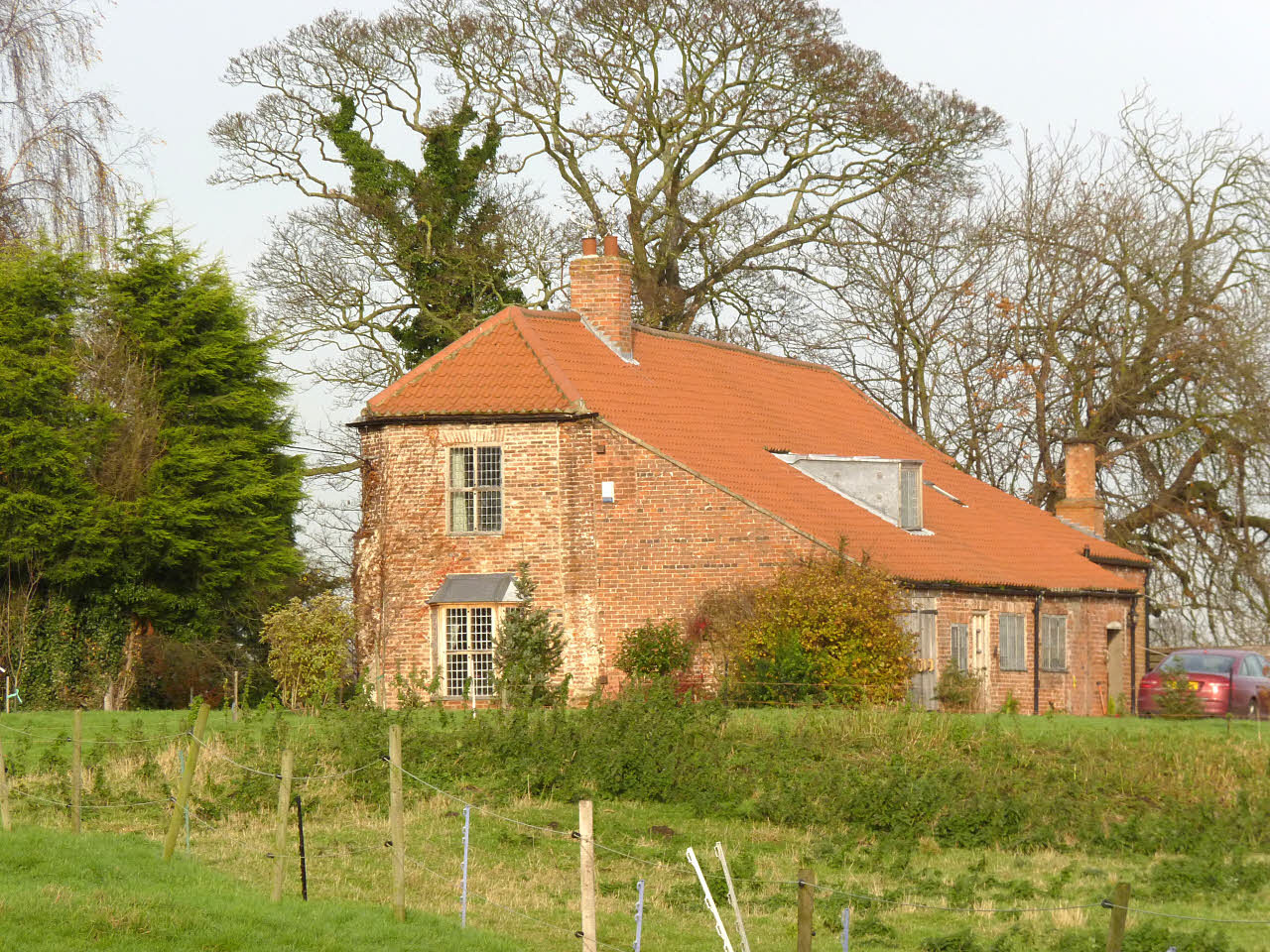
The remnant of the Manor House

The junior William had been schooled in Peterhouse, Cambridge University, at the same time as the infamous Welsh Protestant Separatist firebrand, John Penry. He had also worked for the English Ambassador to the Netherlands, a hotbed for exiled Separatists and Brownists, for 12 years prior to taking up the role of bailiff and postmaster at Scrooby.

Young William Brewster evidently became dissatisfied with the Anglican Church as it was developing at the time. It appears at least from the 1590s he had acquired Protestant or even Brownist beliefs, judging by his children's names. The earlier Jonathan was joined by Fear, Love, Patience, and Wrestling Brewster.

After being jailed for a short time due to hosting a Separatist church in the Manor, William Brewster attempted to leave Scrooby for the Netherlands in 1607. After an unsuccessful first attempt, Brewster succeeded in 1608. He eventually went to New England in 1620 on the Mayflower, as one of the people later called Pilgrim Fathers. The Manor House was demolished early in the 19th century, though the levelled area where it stood can still be made out, as can the twin sets of steps (now just grassy banks) that led down to the ornamental ponds. All that remain are a cottage (perhaps intended for a resident official and not open to the public, though it has commemorative plaques), a substantial brick dovecote and the fishponds. Notice boards direct visitors to the best places to view the historic sites which today are private property.

The parish church of St Wilfrid has an octagonal spire. Other buildings of interest are the remaining buildings on the site of the former manor house, the mill, the old vicarage, the village's historic farmhouses, and the pinfold. The village stocks were sold to America, more than a hundred years ago.

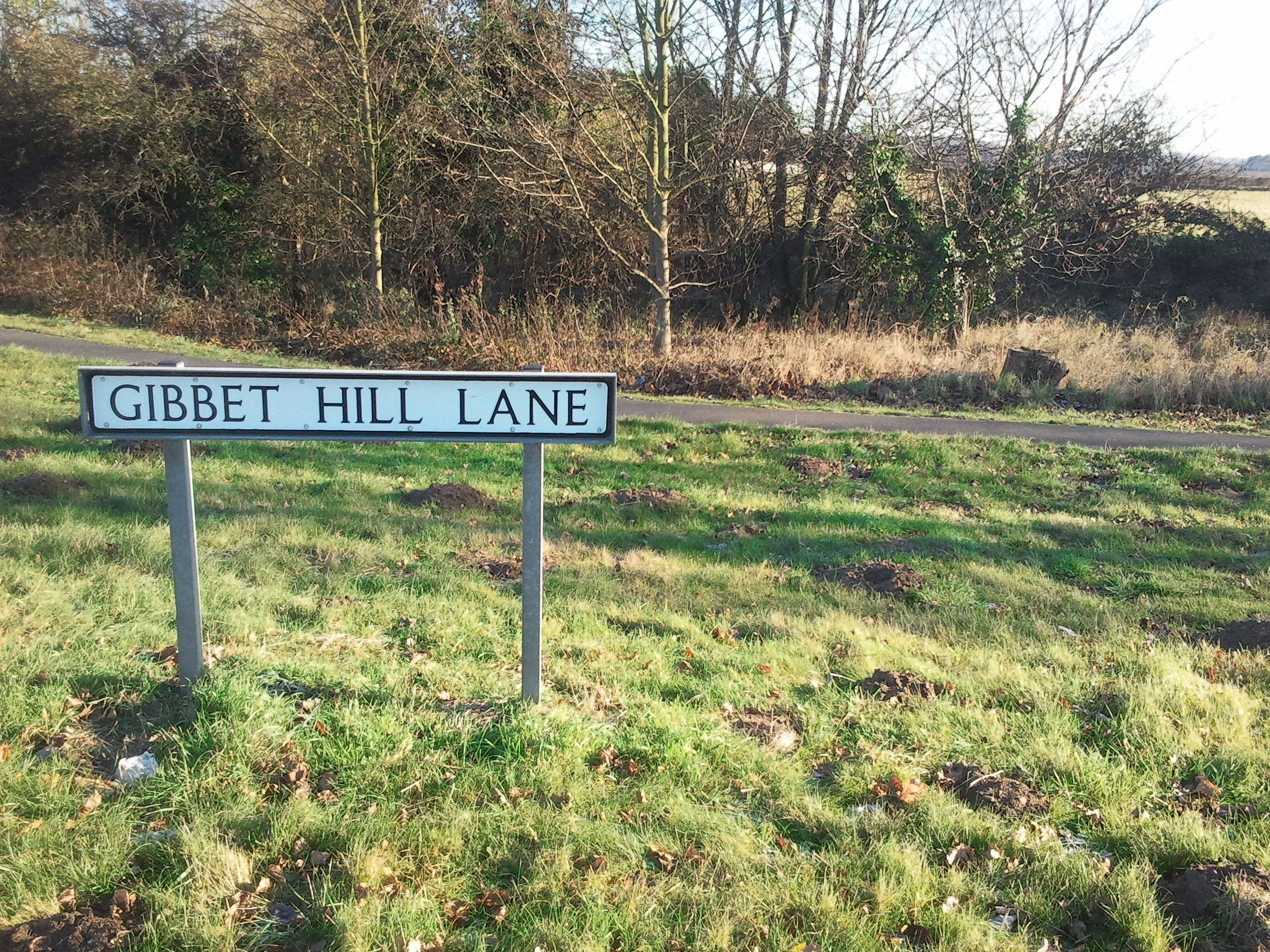
Gibbet Hill Lane refers to the grim events of 1779

Just north of Scrooby, the road that links the A638 and the A614 is called Gibbet Hill Lane. This lane is so named after a brutal crime that took place early in the morning of 3 July 1779 when John Spencer, who had been playing cards with Scrooby's toll-bar keeper, William Yeadon, and his mother (then on a visit), returned to the tollhouse and killed both of them. The crime was enacted for the purposes of robbery, and Spencer gained re-admittance under a pretence that a drove of cattle wished to pass that way. Spencer was interrupted by travellers in the act of dragging one body across the road towards the River Ryton, and arrested shortly thereafter by a search party. He was executed following a trial at Nottingham Assizes, and his body afterwards hung in a gibbet cage on a slope south of the Ryton now denominated Gibbet Hill.

== Places of Worship ==
St Wilfrid's Church is a Grade II* listed Church of England parish church.

== See also ==
- Scrooby Congregation — Protestant separatists who migrated from Scrooby to the Netherlands in 1607/08
- Listed buildings in Scrooby
