= Iniquity =

Iniquity is moral injustice, wickedness or sin. It may refer to:

- Iniquity (band), a Danish death metal group established in 1989
- Iniquity, a 2008 album by the American deathcore band Catalepsy
