= Perversity =

Perversity may refer to:

- perversion
- Biblical `avon (עָוֹן), ἁμαρτία, see sin
- Intersection homology#Perversities
