= Deprivation =

Deprivation or deprive may refer to:

- Poverty, pronounced deprivation in well-being
  - Objective deprivation or poverty threshold, the minimum level of income deemed adequate in a particular country
  - Relative deprivation, the lack of resources to sustain the lifestyle that one is accustomed to or that a society approves
- Deprivation (child development), inadequate meeting of child's needs required for an adequate child development
- Deprivation of rights under color of law, a federal criminal offense under U.S. law
- Deprivation, the taking away from a clergyman of his benefice or other spiritual promotion or dignity by an ecclesiastical court

== Other uses ==
- "Deprivation", a Series D episode of the television series QI (2006)

== See also ==
- Forfeiture (law), deprivation of a right in consequence of the non-performance of some obligation
- Hypoxia (medical), a medical condition where the body is deprived of adequate oxygen supply at the tissue level
- Child neglect, abuse that results in a deprivation of a child's basic needs
