= Pilgrims (Plymouth Colony) =

Early settlers in Massachusetts

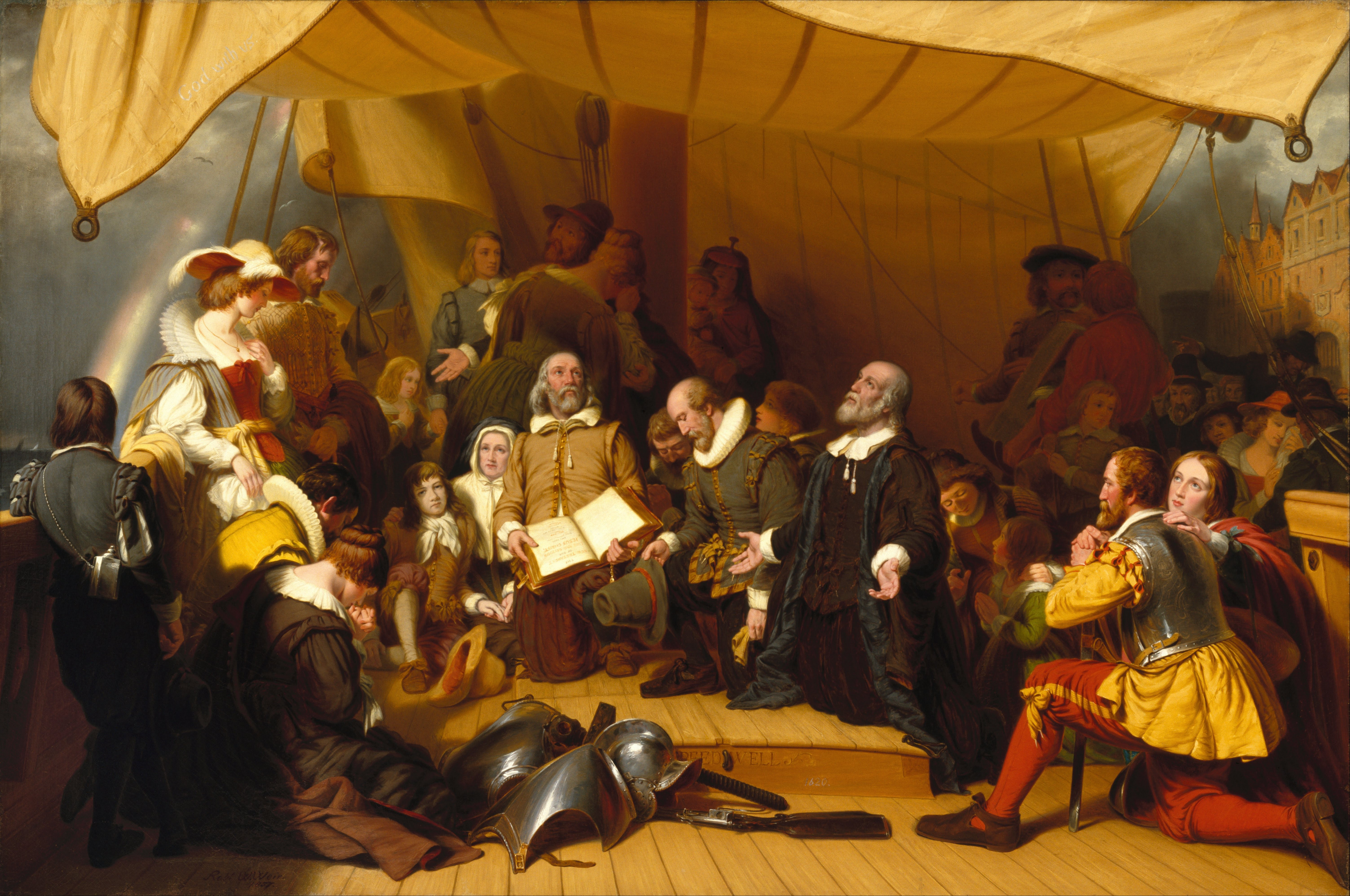
The Embarkation of the Pilgrims, an 1857 portrait by Robert Walter Weir now housed at Brooklyn Museum

The Pilgrims, also known as the Pilgrim Fathers, were the English colonists who traveled to North America on the ship Mayflower and established the Plymouth Colony at what now is Plymouth, Massachusetts, United States. John Smith named this territory New Plymouth in 1614, sharing the name of the Pilgrims' final departure port of Plymouth, Devon, England. The Pilgrims' leadership came from religious congregations of Separatist Puritans who had fled religious persecution in England for the tolerance of 17th-century Holland in the Netherlands.

These Separatists held many of the same Calvinist religious beliefs as conforming Puritans, but unlike them (who wanted a purified established church), Pilgrims believed that their congregations should separate from the Church of England, which led to them being labelled Separatists. After several years of living in exile in Holland, they determined to establish a new settlement in the New World and arranged with investors to fund them. In 1620, they established the Plymouth Colony, in which they erected Congregational churches. The Puritans' later establishment of the Massachusetts Bay Colony eventually became more powerful in the area; but the Pilgrims' story nevertheless became a central theme in the history and culture of the United States.

== History ==
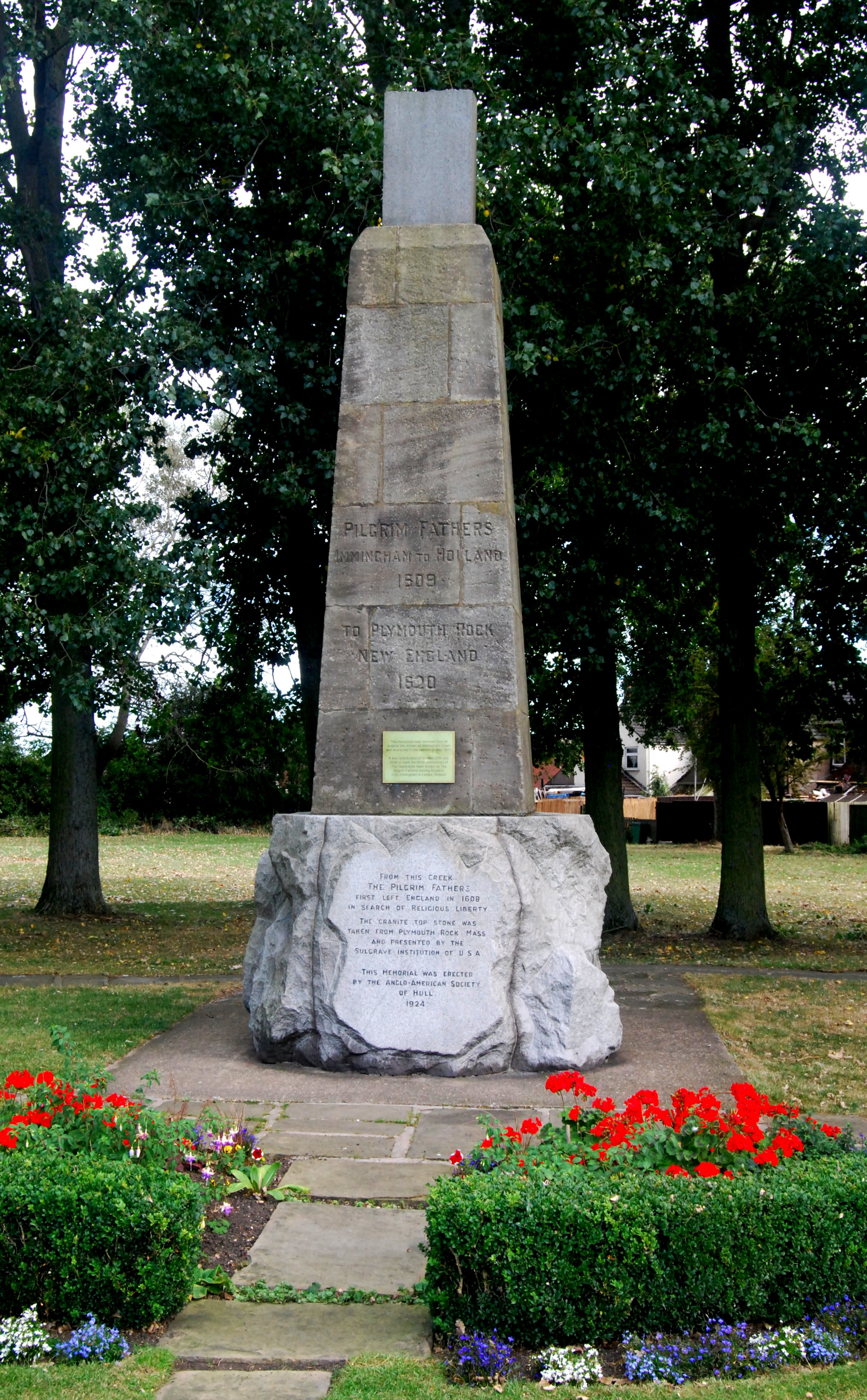
Memorial to the departure of congregation members for Holland in 1608, at Immingham on the southern bank of the Humber estuary

Around 1605, congregations in Nottinghamshire, England led by John Robinson, Richard Clyfton, and John Smyth dissented from the Church of England to form Separatist churches. These held Brownist beliefs—that true churches were voluntary democratic congregations, not whole Christian nations—as taught by Robert Browne, John Greenwood, and Henry Barrowe. As Separatists, they held that their differences with the Church of England were irreconcilable and that their worship should be independent of the trappings, traditions, and organization of a central church.

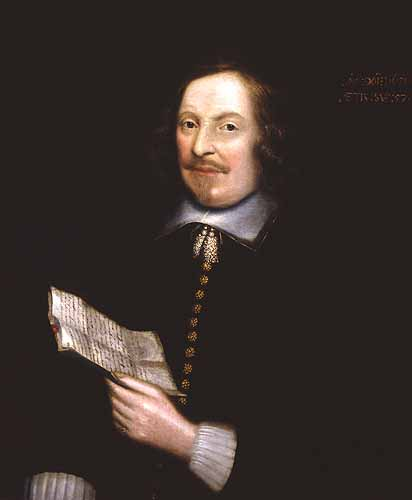
Edward Winslow was one of the most influential Pilgrim leaders. He negotiated the treaty with the Wampanoags, he was the Pilgrims' representative to their financial backers in England, and served as governor of Plymouth Colony. This portrait of him is the only portrait of a Pilgrim that was painted from life. It hangs in the Pilgrim Hall Museum in Plymouth, Massachusetts.

The Separatist movement was controversial. Under the Act of Uniformity 1559, it was illegal not to attend official Church of England services, with a fine of one shilling (£0.05; about £23 today) for each missed Sunday and holy day. The penalties included imprisonment and larger fines for conducting unofficial services. The Seditious Sectaries Act 1592 was specifically aimed at outlawing the Brownists. Under this policy, London Underground Church members were repeatedly imprisoned from 1566, and then Robert Browne and his followers were imprisoned in Norfolk during the 1580s. Henry Barrow, John Greenwood, and John Penry were executed for sedition in 1593. Browne had taken his followers into exile in Middelburg, and Penry urged the London Separatists to emigrate in order to escape persecution, so after his death they went to Amsterdam.

The Archbishop of York, Matthew Hutton, displayed some sympathy to the Puritan cause, writing to Robert Cecil, Secretary of State to James I in 1604:

The Puritans though they differ in Ceremonies and accidentes, yet they agree with us in substance of religion, and I thinke all or the moste parte of them love his Majestie, and the presente state, and I hope will yield to conformitie. But the Papistes are opposite and contrarie in very many substantiall pointes of religion, and cannot but wishe the Popes authoritie and popish religion to be established.

Many Puritans had hoped that reforms and reconciliation would be possible when James came to power which would allow them independence, but the Hampton Court Conference of 1604 denied nearly all of the concessions which they had requested—except for an authorized English translation of the Bible. The same year, Richard Bancroft became Archbishop of Canterbury and launched a campaign against Puritanism and the Separatists. He suspended 300 ministers and fired 80 more, which led some of them to found more Separatist churches. Robinson, Clifton, and their followers founded a Brownist church, making a covenant with God "to walk in all his ways made known, or to be made known, unto them, according to their best endeavours, whatsoever it should cost them, the Lord assisting them".

Archbishop Hutton died in 1606 and Tobias Matthew was appointed as his replacement. He was one of James's chief supporters at the 1604 conference, and he promptly began a campaign to purge the archdiocese of non-conforming influences, including Puritans, Separatists, and those wishing to return to the Catholic faith. Disobedient clergy were replaced, and prominent Separatists were confronted, fined, and imprisoned. He is credited with driving people out of the country who refused to attend Anglican services.

William Brewster was a former diplomatic assistant to the Netherlands. He was living in the Scrooby manor house while serving as postmaster for the village and bailiff to the Archbishop of York. He had been impressed by Clyfton's services and had begun participating in services led by John Smyth in Gainsborough, Lincolnshire. After a time, he arranged for a congregation to meet privately at the Scrooby manor house. Services were held beginning in 1606 with Clyfton as pastor, John Robinson as teacher, and Brewster as the presiding elder. Shortly after, Smyth and members of the Gainsborough group moved on to Amsterdam. Brewster was fined £20 (about £5,096 today) in absentia for his non-compliance with the church. This followed his September 1607 resignation from the postmaster position, about the time that the congregation had decided to follow the Smyth party to Amsterdam.

Scrooby member William Bradford of Austerfield kept a journal of the congregation's events which was eventually published as Of Plymouth Plantation. He wrote concerning this time period:

But after these things they could not long continue in any peaceable condition, but were hunted & persecuted on every side, so as their former afflictions were but as flea-bitings in comparison of these which now came upon them. For some were taken & clapt up in prison, others had their houses besett & watcht night and day, & hardly escaped their hands; and the most were faine to flie & leave their howses & habitations, and the means of their livelehood.

=== Leiden ===
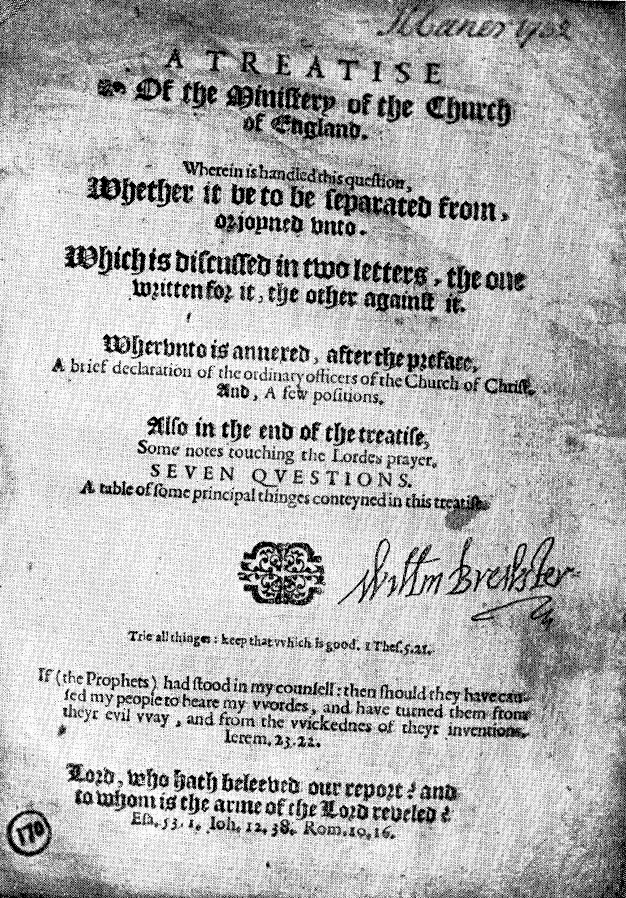
Title page of a pamphlet published by William Brewster in Leiden

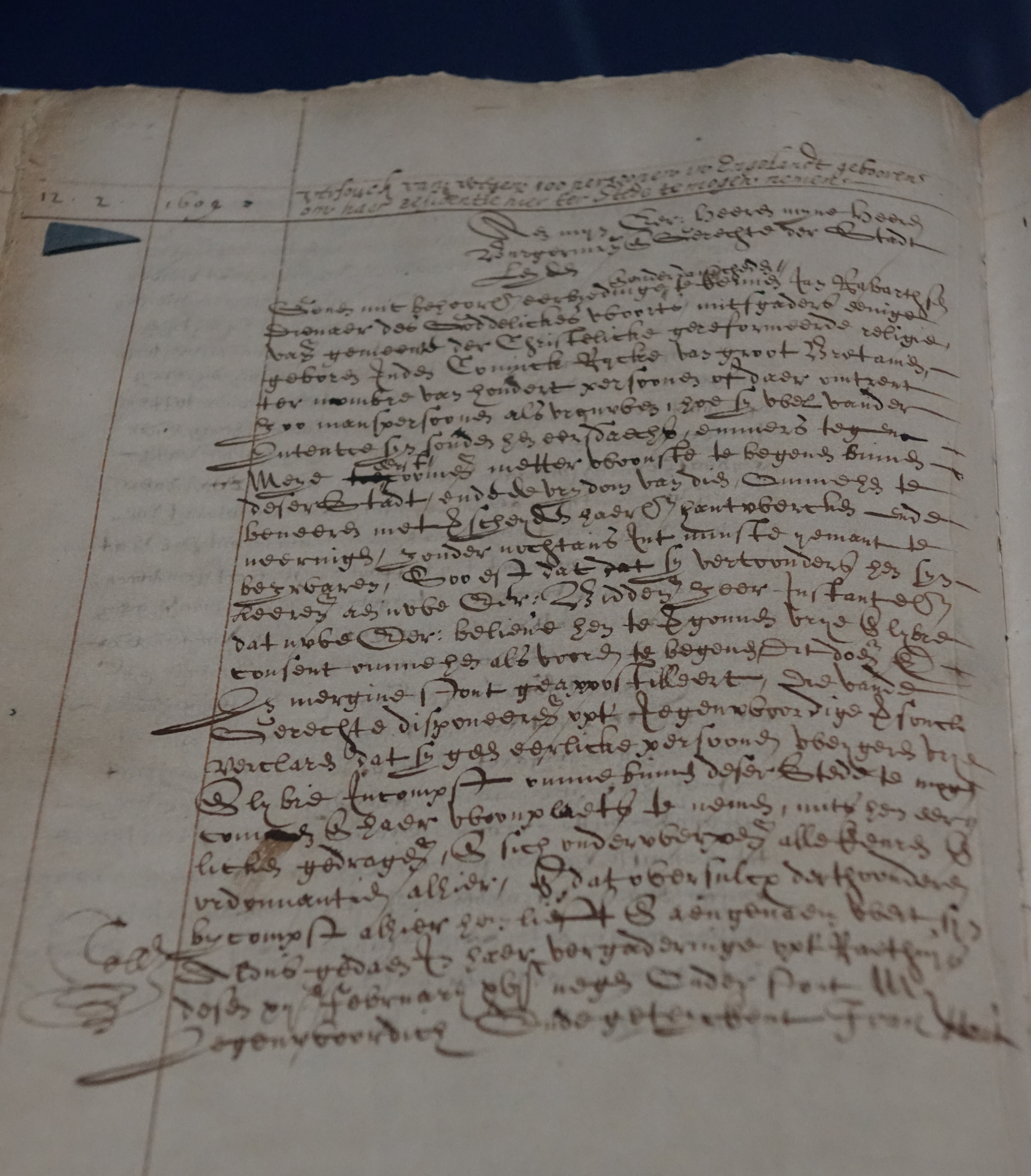
Permission from the city council of Leiden, allowing the Pilgrims to settle there, dated February 12, 1609.

The Pilgrims moved to the Netherlands around 1607–08 and lived in Leiden, Holland, a city of 30,000 inhabitants. Leiden was a thriving industrial center, and many members were able to support themselves working at Leiden University or in the textile, printing, and brewing trades. Others were less able to bring in sufficient income, hampered by their rural backgrounds and the language barrier; for those, accommodation was constructed on an estate bought by Robinson and three partners. Bradford wrote of their years in Leiden:

For these & other reasons they removed to Leyden, a fair & bewtifull citie, and of a sweete situation, but made more famous by ye universitie wherwith it is adorned, in which of late had been so many learned man. But wanting that traffike by sea which Amerstdam injoyes, it was not so beneficiall for their outward means of living & estats. But being now hear pitchet they fell to such trads & imployments as they best could; valewing peace & their spirituall comforte above any other riches whatsoever. And at length they came to raise a competente & comforteable living, but with hard and continuall labor.

William Brewster had been teaching English at the university, and Robinson enrolled in 1615 to pursue his doctorate. There he participated in a series of debates, particularly regarding the contentious issue of Calvinism versus Arminianism (siding with the Calvinists against the Remonstrants). Brewster acquired typesetting equipment about 1616 in a venture financed by Thomas Brewer, and began publishing the debates through a local press.

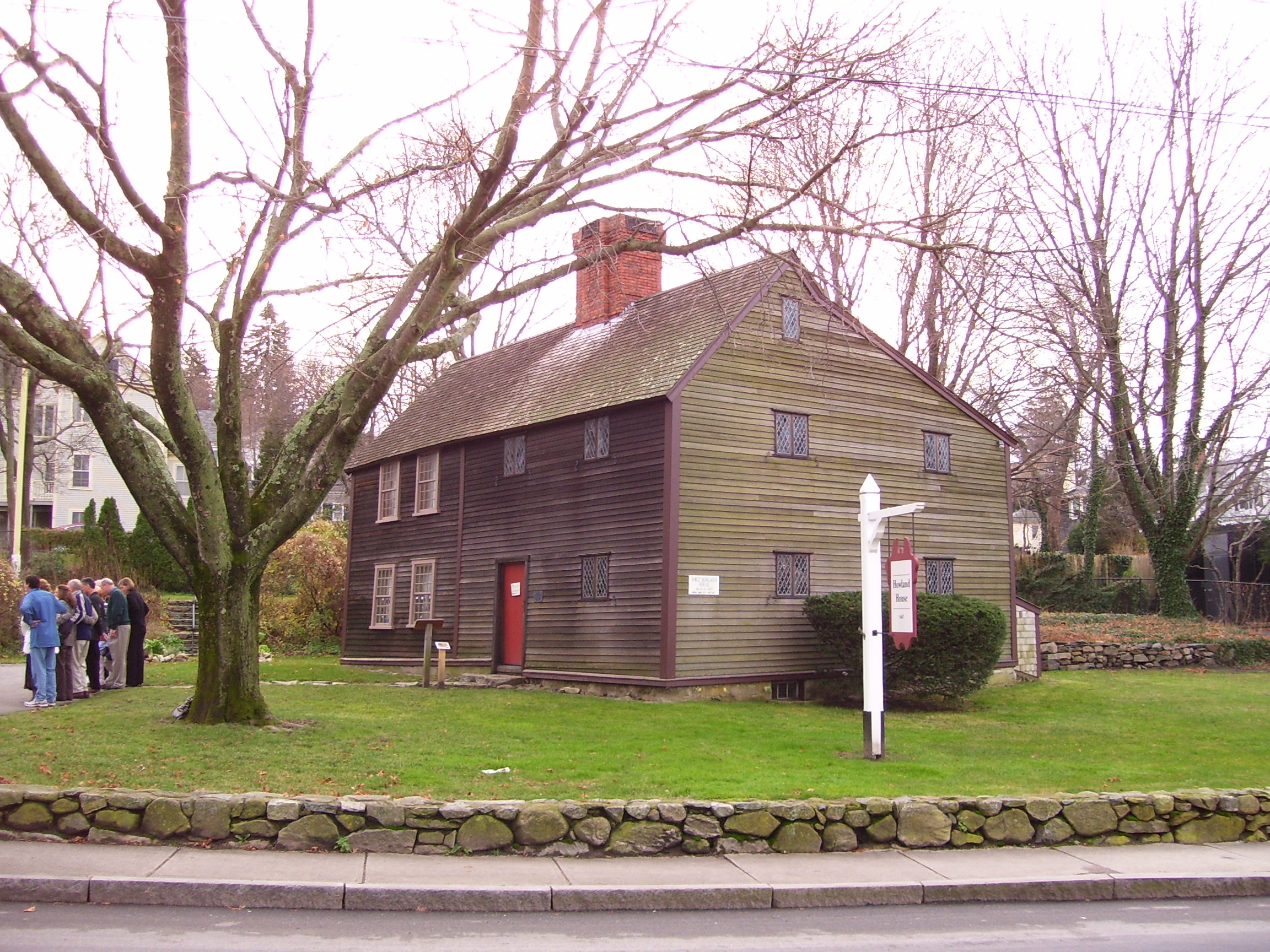
The Jabez Howland House in Plymouth, Massachusetts is the only house in which one of the Pilgrims lived that still stands. The house was built by Jabez Howland. His parents, Pilgrims John Howland and his wife, Elizabeth Tilley Howland, lived with Jabez and his family in this house in their senior years. The house is now a museum.

The Netherlands, however, was a land whose culture and language were strange and difficult for the English congregation to understand or learn. They found the Dutch political situation to be unstable, and their children were becoming more and more Dutch as the years passed. The congregation came to believe that they faced eventual extinction if they remained there.

==== Decision to leave Holland ====
By 1617, the congregation was stable and relatively secure, but there were ongoing issues which needed to be resolved. Bradford noted that many members of the congregation were showing signs of early aging, compounding the difficulties which some had in supporting themselves. A few had spent their savings and given up and returned to England, and the leaders feared that more would follow and that the congregation would become unsustainable. The employment issues made it unattractive for others to come to Leiden, and younger members had begun leaving to find employment and adventure elsewhere. Also compelling was the possibility of missionary work in some distant land, an opportunity that rarely arose in a Protestant stronghold.

Bradford lists some of the reasons for which the Pilgrims felt that they had to leave, including the discouragements that they faced in the Netherlands and the hope of attracting others by finding "a better, and easier place of living", the children of the group being "drawn away by evil examples into extravagance and dangerous courses", and the "great hope, for the propagating and advancing the gospel of the kingdom of Christ in those remote parts of the world." Edward Winslow's list was similar. In addition to the economic worries and missionary possibilities, he stressed that it was important for the people to retain their English identity, culture, and language. They also believed that the English Church in Leiden could do little to benefit the larger community there.

At the same time, there were many uncertainties about moving to such a place as America, as stories had come back about failed colonies. There were fears that the native people would be violent, that there would be no source of food or water, that they might be exposed to unknown diseases, and that travel by sea was always hazardous. Balancing all this was a local political situation which was in danger of becoming unstable. The truce was faltering in the Eighty Years' War, and there was fear over what the attitudes of Spain might be toward them.

Possible destinations included Guiana on the northeast coast of South America where the Dutch had established Essequibo colony, or another site near the Virginia settlements. Virginia was an attractive destination because the presence of the older colony might offer better security and trade opportunities; however, they also felt that they should not settle too near, since that might inadvertently duplicate the political environment back in England. The London Company administered a territory of considerable size in the region, and the intended settlement location was at the mouth of the Hudson River (which instead became the Dutch colony of New Netherland). This plan allayed their concerns of social, political, and religious conflicts, but still promised the military and economic benefits of being close to an established colony.

Robert Cushman and John Carver were sent to England to solicit a land patent. Their negotiations were delayed because of conflicts internal to the London Company, but ultimately a patent was secured in the name of John Wincob on June 9 (Old Style)/June 19 (New Style), 1619. The charter was granted with the king's condition that the Leiden group's religion would not receive official recognition.

Preparations then stalled because of the continued problems within the London Company, and competing Dutch companies approached the congregation with the possibility of settling in the Hudson River area. David Baeckelandt suggests that the Leiden group was approached by Englishman Matthew Slade, son-in-law of Petrus Plancius, a cartographer for the Dutch East India Company. Slade was also a spy for the English Ambassador, and the Pilgrims' plans were therefore known both at court and among influential investors in the Virginia Company's colony at Jamestown. Negotiations were broken off with the Dutch, however, at the encouragement of English merchant Thomas Weston, who assured them that he could resolve the London Company delays. The London Company intended to claim the area explored by Hudson before the Dutch could become fully established, and the first Dutch settlers did not arrive in the area until 1624.

Weston did come with a substantial change, telling the Leiden group that parties in England had obtained a land grant north of the existing Virginia territory to be called New England. This was only partially true; the new grant did come to pass, but not until late in 1620 when the Plymouth Council for New England received its charter. It was expected that this area could be fished profitably, and it was not under the control of the existing Virginia government.

A second change was known only to parties in England who did not inform the larger group. New investors had been brought into the venture who wanted the terms altered so that half of the settled land and property would revert to the investors at the end of the seven-year contract. Also, there had been a provision in the original agreement that allowed each settler to have two days per week to work on personal business, but this provision was dropped from the final agreement without the knowledge of the Pilgrims.

Amid these negotiations, William Brewster found himself involved with religious unrest emerging in Scotland. In 1618, King James had promulgated the Five Articles of Perth which were seen in Scotland as an attempt to encroach on their Presbyterian tradition. Brewster published several pamphlets that were critical of this law, and they were smuggled into Scotland by April 1619. These pamphlets were traced back to Leiden, and the English authorities unsuccessfully attempted to arrest Brewster. English ambassador Dudley Carleton became aware of the situation and began pressuring the Dutch government to extradite Brewster, and the Dutch responded by arresting Thomas Brewer the financier in September. Brewster's whereabouts remain unknown between then and the colonists' departure, but the Dutch authorities did seize the typesetting materials which he had used to print his pamphlets. Meanwhile, Brewer was sent to England for questioning, where he stonewalled government officials until well into 1620. He was ultimately convicted in England for his continued religious publication activities and sentenced in 1626 to a 14-year prison term.

==== Preparations ====
Not all of the congregation were able to depart on the first trip. Many members were not able to settle their affairs within the time constraints, and the budget was limited for travel and supplies; also, the group decided that the initial settlement should be undertaken primarily by younger and stronger members. The remainder agreed to follow if and when they could. Robinson would remain in Leiden with the larger portion of the congregation, and Brewster was to lead the American congregation. The church in America would be run independently, but it was agreed that membership would automatically be granted in either congregation to members who moved between the continents.

With personal and business matters agreed upon, the Pilgrims procured supplies and a small ship. Speedwell was to bring some passengers from the Netherlands to England, then on to America where it would be kept for the fishing business, with a crew hired for support services during the first year. The larger ship Mayflower was leased for transport and exploration services.

=== Voyage ===
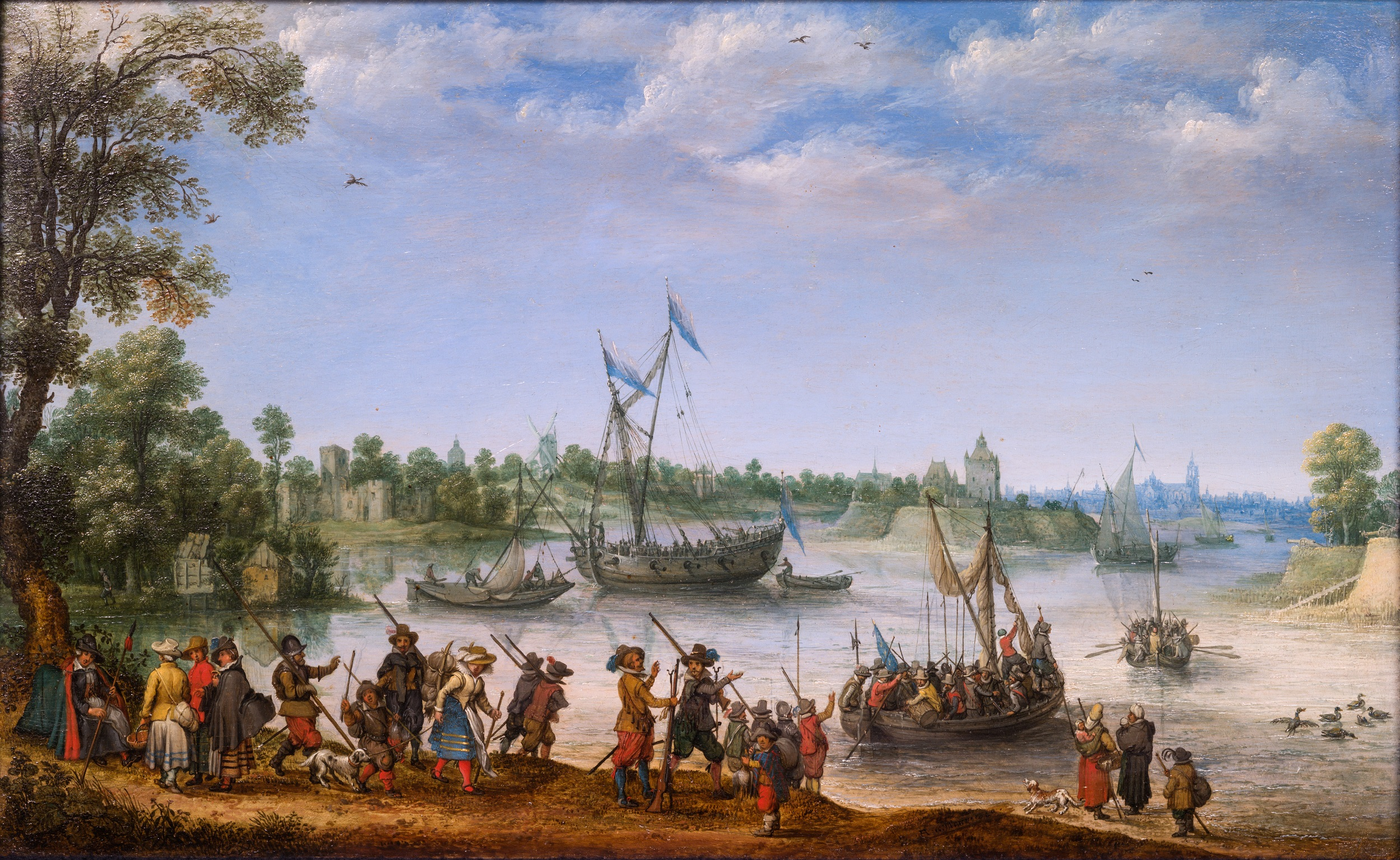
Contemporary depiction of the Pilgrims leaving Delfshaven aboard the Speedwell by Adam Willaerts. c. 1620

The Speedwell was originally named Swiftsure. It was built in 1577 at 60 tons and was part of the English fleet that defeated the Spanish Armada. It departed Delfshaven in July 1620 with the Leiden colonists, after a canal ride from Leyden of about seven hours. It reached Southampton, Hampshire, and met with the Mayflower and the additional colonists hired by the investors. With final arrangements made, the two vessels set out on August 5 (Old Style)/August 15 (New Style).

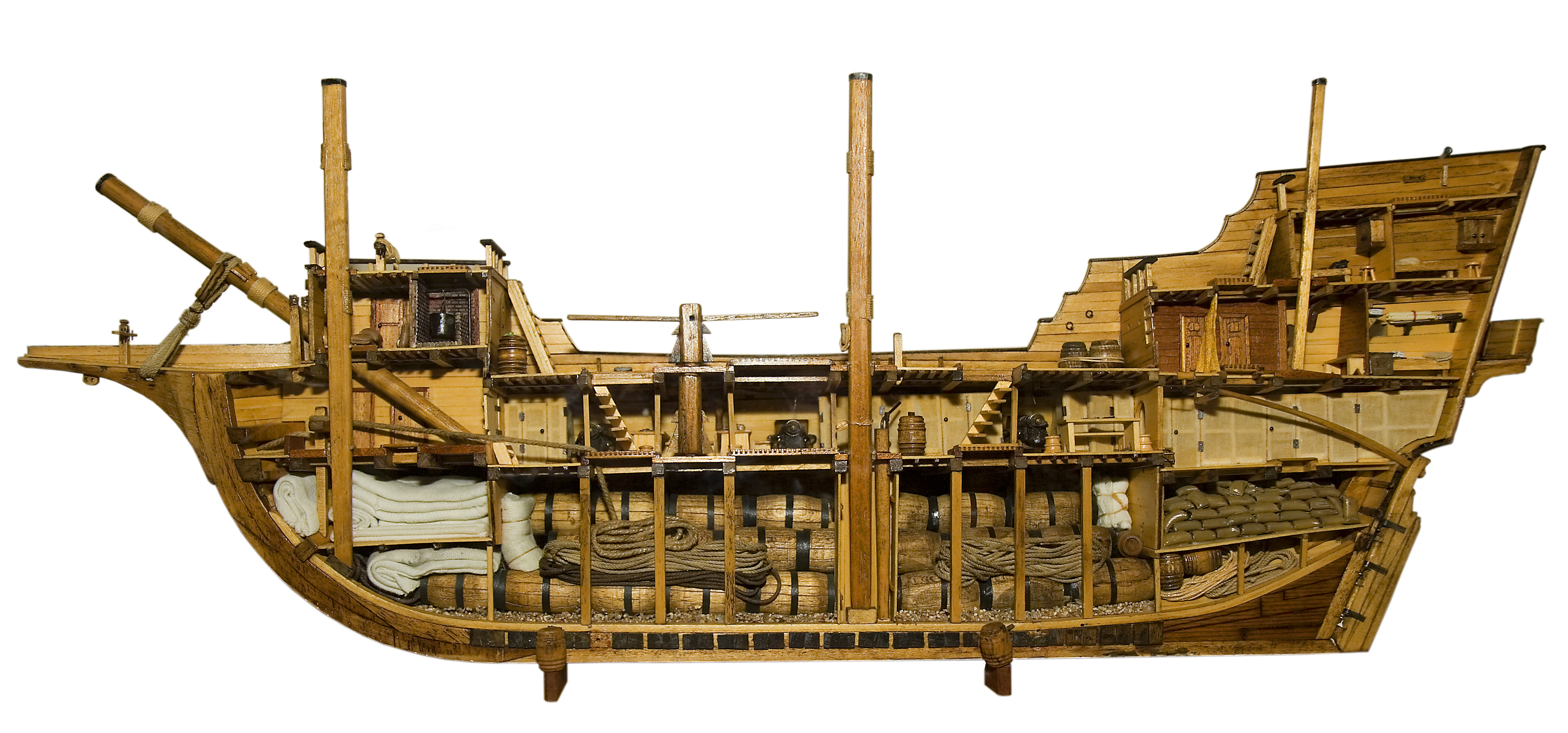
Model of a typical merchantman of the period, showing the cramped conditions that had to be endured

Soon after, the Speedwell crew reported that their ship was taking on water, so both were diverted to Dartmouth, Devon. The crew inspected Speedwell for leaks and sealed them, but their second attempt to depart got them only as far as Plymouth, Devon. The crew decided that Speedwell was untrustworthy, and her owners sold her; the ship's master and some of the crew transferred to the Mayflower for the trip. William Bradford observed that the Speedwell seemed "overmasted", thus putting a strain on the hull; and he expressed suspicions that crew members might have deliberately caused it, allowing them to abandon their year-long commitments. Passenger Robert Cushman wrote that the leaking was caused by a loose board.

==== Atlantic crossing ====
Of the 120 combined passengers on the two ships, 102 were chosen to travel on the ship with the supplies consolidated. Of these, about half had come by way of Leiden, and about 30 of the adults were members of the congregation. The reduced party finally sailed successfully on September 6 (Old Style)/September 16 (New Style), 1620.

Initially the trip went smoothly, but under way they were met with strong winds and storms. One of these caused a main beam to crack, and the possibility was considered of turning back, even though they were more than halfway to their destination. However, they repaired the ship sufficiently to continue by using a "great iron screw" brought along by the colonists (probably a jack to be used for either house construction or a cider press). Passenger John Howland was washed overboard in the storm, but he caught a top-sail halyard trailing in the water and was pulled back on board.

One crew member and one passenger died before they reached land. A child was born at sea and named Oceanus.

=== Arrival in America ===
1620 place names mentioned by Bradford

The Mayflower passengers sighted land on November 9, 1620 after enduring miserable conditions for about 65 days, and William Brewster led them in singing Psalm 100. They confirmed that the area was Cape Cod within the New England territory recommended by Weston. They attempted to sail the ship around the cape towards the Hudson River, but they encountered shoals and difficult currents around Cape Malabar (the old French name for Monomoy Island). They decided to turn around, and the ship was anchored in Provincetown Harbor by November 11/21.

==== The Mayflower Compact ====
The charter was incomplete for the Plymouth Council for New England when the colonists departed England (it was granted while they were in transit on November 3/13). They arrived without a patent; the older Wincob patent was from their abandoned dealings with the London Company. Some of the passengers, aware of the situation, suggested that they were free to do as they chose upon landing, without a patent in place, and to ignore the contract with the investors.

The Leiden congregants, therefore, drafted a brief contract known as the Mayflower Compact, promising cooperation among the settlers "for the general good of the Colony unto which we promise all due submission and obedience." It organized them into what was called a "civill body politick," in which issues would be decided by voting, the key ingredient of democracy. It was ratified by majority rule, with 41 adult male Pilgrims signing for the 102 passengers (74 males and 28 females). Included in the company were 13 male servants and three female servants, along with some sailors and craftsmen hired for short-term service to the colony. At this time, John Carver was chosen as the colony's first governor. It was Carver who had chartered the Mayflower and his is the first signature on the Mayflower Compact, being the most respected and affluent member of the group. The Mayflower Compact is considered to be one of the seeds of American democracy, and historians have called it the world's first written constitution.

==== First landings ====
Thorough exploration of the area was delayed for more than two weeks because the shallop or pinnace (a smaller sailing vessel) which they brought had been partially dismantled to fit aboard the Mayflower and was further damaged in transit. Small parties, however, waded to the beach to fetch firewood and attend to long-deferred personal hygiene.

Myles Standish was an English soldier from Chorley whom the colonists had met while in Leiden, and they had asked him to join them as their military adviser. He and Christopher Jones led several exploratory trips ashore while awaiting the shallop's repair. They encountered an old European-built house and iron kettle, left behind by some ship's crew, and a few recently cultivated fields showing corn stubble.

They came upon an artificial mound near the dunes which they partially uncovered and found to be an Indian grave. Farther along, a similar mound was found, more recently made, and they discovered that some of the burial mounds also contained corn. The colonists took some of the corn, intending to use it as seed for planting, while they reburied the rest. William Bradford later recorded in his book Of Plymouth Plantation that, after the shallop had been repaired,

They also found two of the Indian's houses covered with mats, and some of their implements in them; but the people had run away and could not be seen. Without permission they took more corn, and beans of various colours. These they brought away, intending to give them full satisfaction when they should meet with any of them—as about six months afterwards they did.

And it is to be noted as a special providence of God, and a great mercy to this poor people, that they thus got seed to plant corn the next year, or they might have starved; for they had none, nor any likelihood of getting any, till too late for the planting season.

By December, most of the passengers and crew had become ill, coughing violently. Many also were suffering from the effects of scurvy. There had already been ice and snowfall, hampering exploration efforts, and nearly half of the Pilgrim passengers died during the first winter.

==== First contact ====
Explorations resumed on December 6/16. The shallop party headed south along the cape, consisting of seven colonists from Leiden, three from London, and seven crew; they chose to land at the area inhabited by the Nauset people (the area around Brewster, Chatham, Eastham, Harwich, and Orleans) where they saw some people on the shore who fled when they approached. Inland they found more mounds, one containing acorns which they exhumed, and more graves, which they decided not to disturb. They remained ashore overnight and heard cries near the encampment. The following morning, they were attacked by Indians who shot at them with arrows. The colonists retrieved their firearms and shot back, then chased them into the woods but did not find them. There was no more contact with them for several months.

The Indians were already familiar with the English, who had intermittently visited the area for fishing and trade before Mayflower arrived. In the Cape Cod area, relations were poor following a visit several years earlier by Thomas Hunt. Hunt kidnapped 20 people from Patuxet (the site of Plymouth Colony) and another seven from Nausett, and he attempted to sell them as slaves in Europe. One of the Patuxet men was Squanto, who became an ally of the Plymouth Colony. He had escaped slavery and made his way to England, where he became fluent in English. He ultimately returned to America, only to discover that his entire village had died from plague.

==== Settlement ====
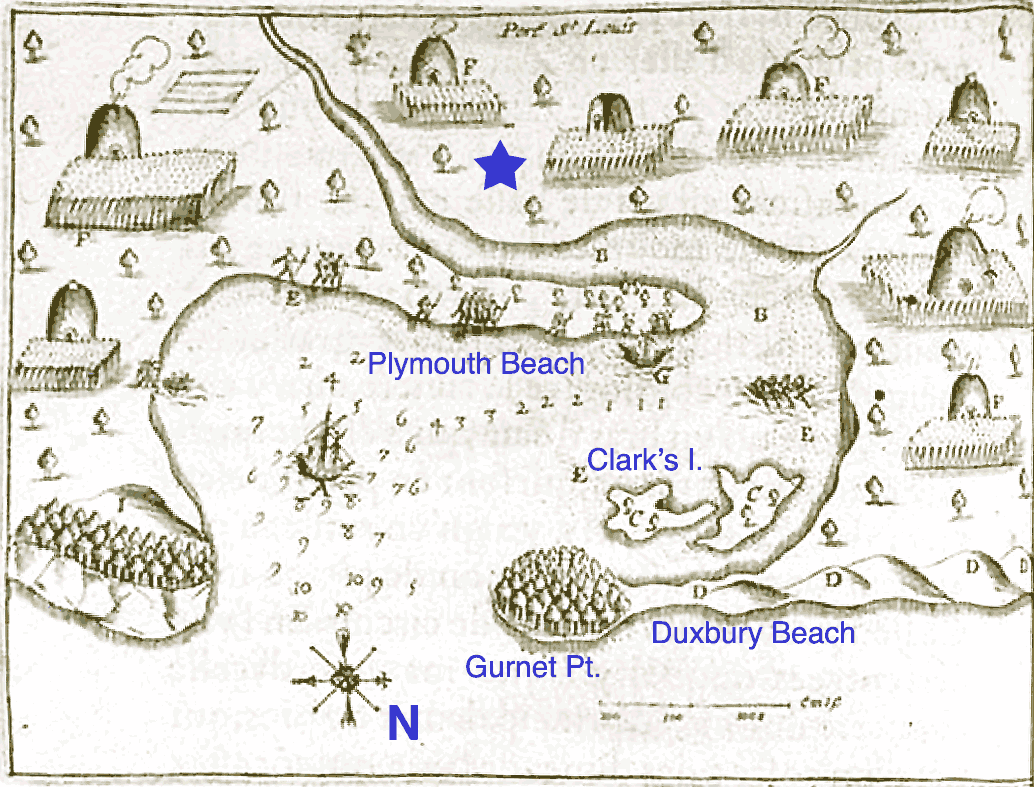
Samuel de Champlain's 1605 map of Plymouth Harbor showing the Wampanoag village of Patuxet, with some modern place names added for reference. The star marks the approximate location of the Plymouth Colony.

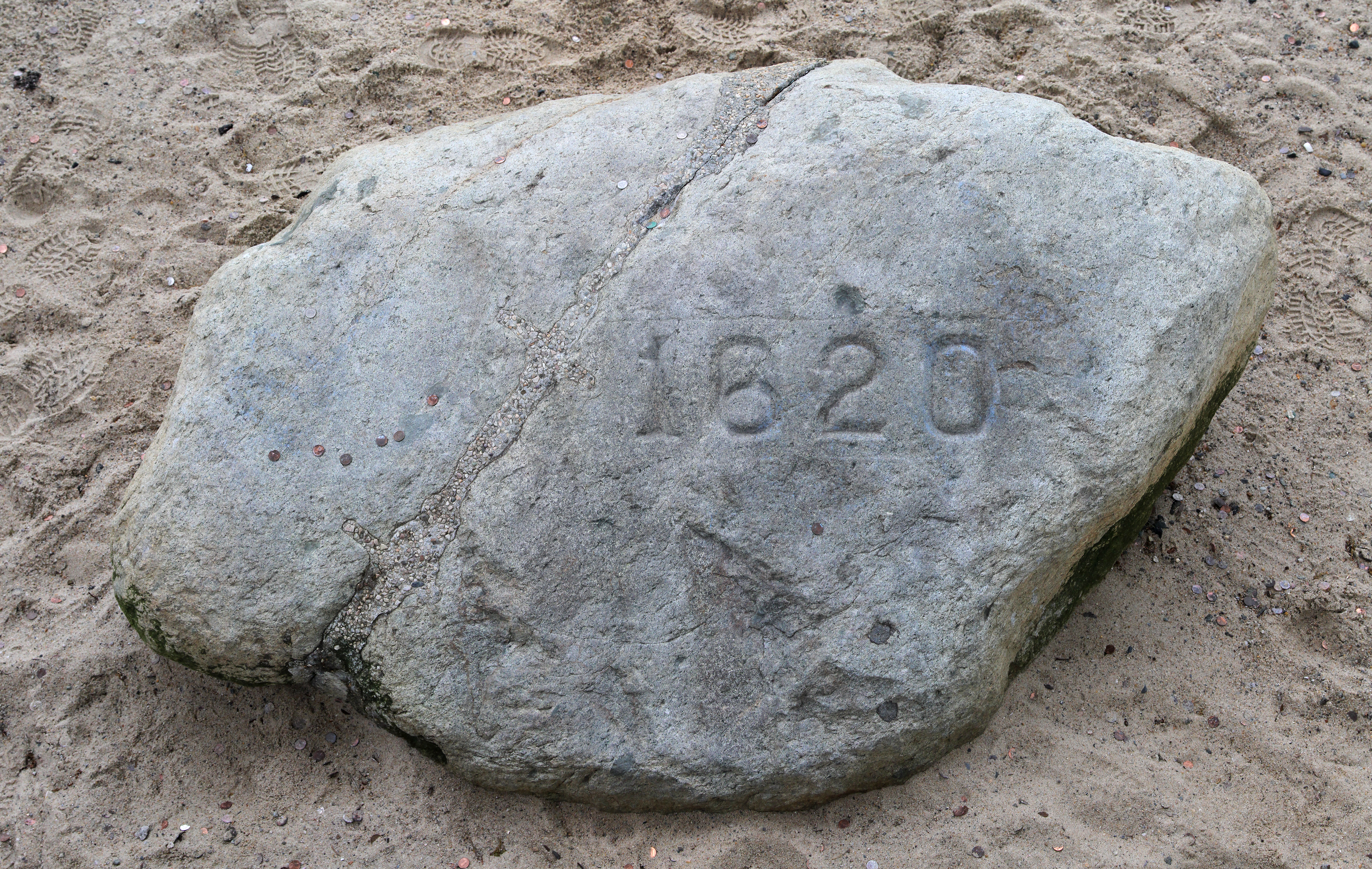
Plymouth Rock commemorates the landing of the Mayflower in 1620

Continuing westward, the shallop's mast and rudder were broken by storms and the sail was lost. They rowed for safety, encountering the harbor formed by Duxbury and Plymouth barrier beaches. They remained at this spot for two days to recuperate and repair equipment. They named it Clark's Island for a Mayflower mate who first set foot on it.

They resumed exploration on Monday, December 11/21 when the party crossed over to the mainland and surveyed the area that ultimately became the settlement. The anniversary of this survey is observed in Massachusetts as Forefathers' Day and is traditionally associated with the Plymouth Rock landing tradition. This land was especially suited to winter building because it had already been cleared, and the tall hills provided a good defensive position.

The cleared village was known as Patuxet to the Wampanoag people and was abandoned about three years earlier following a plague that killed all of its residents. The "Indian fever" involved hemorrhaging and is assumed to have been fulminating smallpox. The outbreak had been severe enough that the colonists discovered unburied skeletons in the dwellings.

The exploratory party returned to the Mayflower, which was anchored twenty-five miles (40 km) away, having been brought to the harbor on December 16/26. The Pilgrims evaluated the nearby sites and selected a hill in Plymouth (so named on earlier charts) on December 19/29.

The Pilgrims began construction immediately, with the first common house nearly completed by January 9/19, 20 feet square and built for general use. At this point, each single man was ordered to join himself to one of the 19 families in order to eliminate the need to build any more houses than absolutely necessary. Each extended family was assigned a plot one-half rod wide and three rods long for each household member, then each family built its own dwelling. They brought supplies ashore, and the settlement was mostly complete by early February.

When the first house was finished, it immediately became a hospital for the ill Pilgrims. Thirty-one of the company were dead by the end of February, with deaths still rising. Coles Hill became the first cemetery, on a prominence above the beach, and they allowed grass to overgrow the graves for fear that the Indians would discover how weakened the settlement had actually become.

Between the landing and March, only 47 colonists had survived the diseases that they contracted on the ship. During the worst of the sickness, only six or seven of the group were able to feed and care for the rest. In this time, half the Mayflower crew also died.

William Bradford became governor in 1621 upon the death of John Carver. On March 22, 1621, the Pilgrims of Plymouth Colony signed a peace treaty with Massasoit of the Wampanoags. Bradford surrendered the patent of Plymouth Colony to the freemen in 1640, minus a small reserve of three tracts of land. He served as governor for 11 consecutive years, and was elected to various other terms before his death in 1657.

The colony contained Bristol County, Plymouth County, and Barnstable County, Massachusetts. The Massachusetts Bay Colony was reorganized and issued a new charter as the Province of Massachusetts Bay in 1691, and Plymouth ended its history as a separate colony.

== Etymology ==
=== Bradford's history ===
The first use of the word pilgrims for the Mayflower passengers appeared in William Bradford's 1651 Of Plymouth Plantation. In recounting his group's July 1620 departure from Leiden, he used the imagery of Hebrews 11 (Hebrews 11:13–16) about Old Testament "strangers and pilgrims" who had the opportunity to return to their old country but instead longed for a better, heavenly country.

So they lefte goodly & pleasante citie, which had been ther resting place, nere 12 years; but they knew they were pilgrimes, & looked not much on these things; but lift up their eyes to y^{e} heavens, their dearest cuntrie, and quieted their spirits.

There is no record of the term Pilgrims being used to describe Plymouth's founders for 150 years after Bradford wrote this passage, except when quoting him. The Mayflower's story was retold by historians Nathaniel Morton (in 1669) and Cotton Mather (in 1702), and both paraphrased Bradford's passage and used his word pilgrims. At Plymouth's Forefathers' Day observance in 1793, Rev. Chandler Robbins recited this passage.

=== Popular use ===
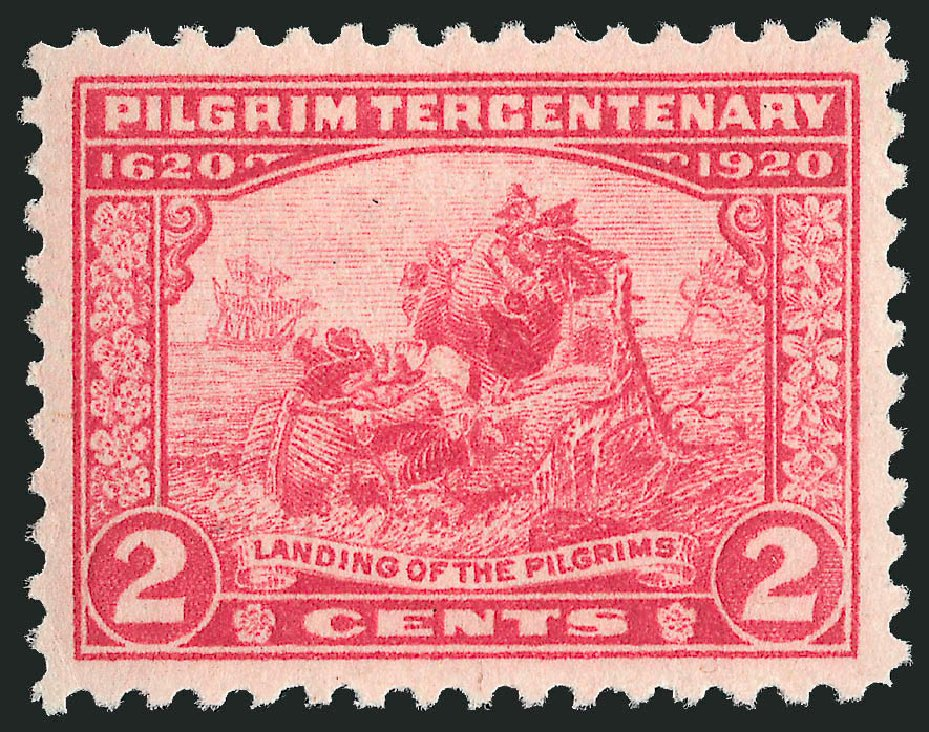
1920 U.S. stamp celebrating the Pilgrim Tercentenary

The name Pilgrims was probably not in popular use before about 1798, even though Plymouth celebrated Forefathers' Day several times between 1769 and 1798 and used a variety of terms to honor Plymouth's founders. The term Pilgrims was not mentioned, other than in Robbins' 1793 recitation. The first documented use of the term that was not simply quoting Bradford was at a December 22, 1798, celebration of Forefathers' Day in Boston. A song composed for the occasion used the word Pilgrims, and the participants drank a toast to "The Pilgrims of Leyden". The term was used prominently during Plymouth's next Forefather's Day celebration in 1800, and was used in Forefathers' Day observances thereafter.

By the 1820s, the term Pilgrims was becoming more common. Daniel Webster repeatedly referred to "the Pilgrims" in his December 22, 1820, address for Plymouth's bicentennial which was widely read. Harriet Vaughan Cheney used it in her 1824 novel A Peep at the Pilgrims in Sixteen Thirty-Six, and the term also gained popularity with the 1825 publication of Felicia Hemans's classic poem "The Landing of the Pilgrim Fathers".

== See also ==
- Mayflower Society
- National Monument to the Forefathers
- Pilgrim Hall Museum
- Pilgrim Tercentenary half dollar
- Thanksgiving (United States)
- List of Mayflower passengers
- List of Mayflower passengers who died at sea November/December 1620
- List of Mayflower passengers who died in the winter of 1620–21
