= Elsie Chamberlain =

British Congregational Church minister and radio broadcaster

- by Walter Stoneman
- Born: Elsie Chamberlain; 3 March 1910; Islington
- Died: 10 April 1991 (aged 81); Nottingham
- Education: King's College, London
- Occupations: Radio presenter, minister
- Known for: BBC radio presenter, first woman to several jobs in the church
- Spouse: John Leslie St Clair Garrington
- Children: One adopted child

Elsie Dorothea Chamberlain (3 March 1910 – 10 April 1991) was a British Congregational Church minister and radio broadcaster. She was the first woman minister in the RAF and a leader of the Congregational Federation of churches that formed in 1972.

== Life ==
Chamberlain was born in Islington in 1910. Her father had been brought up Church Of England but, following her mother's lead, the family joined a Congregational church - Islington Chapel on the corner of Upper Street and Church Street (now Gaskin Street). She was sent to the Channing School for Girls which was Unitarian in foundation. On leaving school, although she qualified to teach the violin, she trained and began work as a dress designer. In the early 1930s her minister, Robert Shepherd, encouraged her to consider the call to ministry and she joined a group that he led learning Hebrew. Still in London, she went on to King's College, London which had a strong Anglican tradition. One of the Anglicans there was John Leslie St Clair Garrington who was two years ahead of her in his training. He wanted to enter the church. Their initial meeting was confrontational but by 1939 they were determined to marry. Just before the start of the war Chamberlain went to work with Reverend Muriel Paulden in Toxteth in Liverpool. In those first few months the Sunday Schools were pretty empty as the local children were evacuated. Chamberlain was involved in visiting the children in their new homes but many soon returned to Toxteth. In 1941 she was appointed to her own church, Christ Church New Southgate & Friern Barnet which led to an invitation in 1944 to speak at Hyde Park Corner.

In 1946 she became the first woman chaplain in the Royal Air Force. This was due to the intercession of Margaret Wedgwood Benn (Viscountess Stansgate) and the appointment of a woman annoyed the Archbishop of Canterbury. Chamberlain had to leave the position when she started to suffer from arthritis. The following year there was great media interest when she married. Her husband had been given a parish and Chamberlain became a "vicar's wife". The position was due to Viscountess Stansgate who, through her husband, had enlisted the help of the Lord Chancellor to appoint Garrington to a parish in his gift. This overcame objections from the Bishop of London that a vicar's wife could not have split loyalties. By the November she had her own church loyalties as part-time minister in Richmond.

In 1950 she became a producer for the BBC of a short radio programme called "Lift Up Your Hearts" which gave a religious view to each day and it still continues as BBC Radio 4's "Thought for the Day".

In 1956 she became the first woman to chair the Congregational Union of England and Wales.

Despite her strong opposition the Congregational Church merged with the English Presbyterian Church. She became involved with 300 churches in the who decided to not join the merger that created the United Reformed Church. They started the Congregational Federation with an office in Nottingham in 1972. The leaders were Viscountess Stansgate, Reginald Cleaves, John Wilcox and Chamberlain.

== Death and legacy ==
Chamberlain died in hospital in Nottingham in 1991. In the following month it was agreed that a plaque should be placed at the chapel at Chulmleigh recognising her as a minister emeritus. The Congregational church members at Castle Gate, Nottingham decided to commission Roy Porter to paint a portrait of Chamberlain that was displayed at their church with another by Porter of Reginald Cleaves who was another important leader in the Congregational Federation.
