= Raleigh Road United Church, Richmond =

Raleigh Road United Church
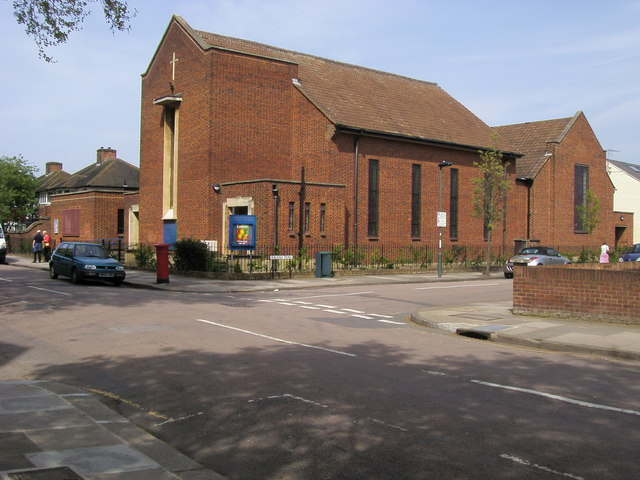
- Raleigh Road United Church
- 51°28′3.8346″N 0°17′27.2538″W
- Location: Raleigh Road, Richmond, London TW9 2HN
- Country: England
- Denomination: Methodist and United Reformed
- Website: raleighroadunitedchurch.uk

History
- Former name(s): Kew Road Methodist Church; St. Paul’s Congregational Church; St Paul's United Reformed Church

Architecture
- Functional status: Active
- Completed: 1956

Raleigh Road United Church, at the corner of Raleigh Road and Stanmore Gardens in Richmond, London consists of two former churches.

== History ==
During 1868, the Kew Road Methodist Church was started. In 1898, St Paul's Congregational Church started. The building was funded mainly by Alderman Sir Charles Burt, a prominent member of The Vineyard Church and a former mayor of Richmond.

== Minister ==
The minister is Revd Stephen Lewis. The deacon is Richard Goldstraw.

== Activities ==
Students can attend a Junior Church session.
