= International Congregational Fellowship =

International Congregational Fraternity
- Classification: Protestant
- Orientation: Congregational
- Origin: 1977
- Congregations: 2,843
- Members: 1,709,402
- Official website: www.internationalcongregationalfellowship.org

The International Congregational Fellowship (International Congregational Fellowship) is an association that brings together congregational denominations around the world in order to promote mutual cooperation.

== History ==
=== Background ===
In 1891, in London, the International Congregational Council (ICC) was founded. This body represented, for many decades, congregational unity throughout the world.

However, in the 20th century, Liberal Theology and Ecumenism spread among congregational churches throughout the world. Many congregational churches, as a result, abandoned the doctrine of biblical inerrancy and also the distinctives of Congregationalism.

In the 1960s and 1970s, several congregational groups around the world merged with Presbyterian and/or Methodist and/or Anglican groups, forming denominations such as the Evangelical Presbyterian Church of Portugal, Uniting Church in Australia, United Church of Canada, Church of North India, Church of South India and United Reformed Church.

In 1970, the ICC was already formed by several united churches, which were also members of the Alliance of Reformed Churches that maintain the Presbyterian System (AIRSP). Thus, in that year, the ICC and AIRSP merged, giving rise to the World Alliance of Reformed Churches (AMIR). In 2010, the AMIR merged with the Reformed Ecumenical Council to form the current World Communion of Reformed Churches (CMIR).

=== Formation ===
In 1975, Congregationalists from various parts of the world met at Chiselhurst in the United Kingdom to discuss the need and possibility of some kind of worldwide fellowship to replace the ICC that had been dissolved that decade. Thus, in 1977, the inaugural conference of the ICF was held.

In the years that followed, the organization expanded, adding congregational unions and associations from around the world. In the 21st century, it is the largest congregational fellowship in the world in terms of membership.

== Differentiation of the World Evangelical Congregational Fellowship ==
Another large global organization of congregational churches is the World Evangelical Congregational Fellowship (FMEC). This has a more conservative and evangelical stance than the ICF. While the FMEC requires its members to affirm biblical inerrancy, the ICF does not require such a commitment.

Thus, the majority of ICF members are also members of the World Communion of Reformed Churches.

== Members ==
In 2025, the members of the International Congregational Fellowship were:

Country	Denomination	Number of congregations	Number of members	Year
South Africa, Botswana, Namibia and Zimbabwe	United Congregational Church of Southern Africa (Note: It is also a member of the World Communion of Reformed Churches.)	1,000	1,500,000	2024
South Africa	Union of Congregational Churches in South Africa	-	-	-
Argentina	Evangelical Congregational Church in Argentina	120	6,000	2021
Armenia	Congregational Churches in Armenia	-	-	-
Australia and New Zealand	Congregational Federation of Australia and New Zealand	31	2,985	2004
Brazil	Evangelical Congregational Church in Brazil	375	50,000	2010
South Korea	Korean Puritan Movement	-	-	-
United States	National Association of Congregational Christian Churches	304	41,582	2020
Greece	Congregational Churches in Greece	-	-	-
Guyana	Guyana Congregational Union	40	2,452	2006
India	Congregational Church of India (Maraland)	23	5,500	2006
Myanmar	Congregational Church of Myanmar	-	-	-
United Kingdom	Union of Welsh Independents	390	20,000	2006
United Kingdom	Congregational Federation	235	10,883	2004
Samoa	Congregational Christian Church of Samoa	325	70,000	2006
Global	International Congregational Fellowship	2,843	1,709,402	2004-2025
