= Council for World Mission =

Christian community

- Classification: Protestant
- Orientation: Reformed Tradition and United Churches
- General Secretary: Jooseop Keum
- Associations: World Council of Churches
- Region: Global
- Headquarters: Singapore
- Origin: 1977
- Merger of: London Missionary Society, Commonwealth Missionary Society and Presbyterian Council of Missions
- Members: 36 denominations
- Official website: www.cwmission.org

The Council for World Mission (CWM) is a worldwide partnership of Christian churches, comprising 36 denominations that share resources, people, skills, and insights globally and locally to accomplish and fulfill the Christian mission. The organization includes churches of Reformed and United tradition, many of which historically originated from the work of the London Missionary Society (1795), the Commonwealth Missionary Society (1836), and the Presbyterian Council for Missions (1847).

== History ==
=== Background ===
The CWM has its roots in the London Missionary Society, founded in 1795, the Commonwealth Missionary Society founded in 1836, and the Presbyterian Council for Missions, founded in 1847.

These three predecessor missionary organizations were constituted with the goal to evangelize regions such as the South Pacific, Africa, India, and China.

During the 20th century, the churches founded by these missions became autonomous, consolidating local identity and drawing attention to the need for a global missionary partnership based on equality between churches of the Global North and South.

=== Foundation (1977) ===
In 1977, the historic missions were reorganized as the Council for World Mission (CWM), with the aim of promoting missionary cooperation among partner churches, each considered both agent and recipient of God's mission. The international headquarters is located in Singapore, with regional offices in Africa, Asia, the Caribbean, the Pacific, and Europe.

The member churches are represented by 144 delegates, four from each member church. The delegates elect the Moderator, Treasurer, and all members of the Board of Directors.

The member churches meet annually to approve any amendments to the Memorandum and Articles of Association, appoint the General Secretary and to admit or expel members upon the recommendation of the Board of Directors.

== Organization and purpose ==
The CWM promotes:

- Global missionary cooperation;
- Strengthening solidarity between churches of the North and South;
- Justice, peace, and integrity of creation;
- Theological and missionary training in partnership with seminaries and universities.

The organization participates in the World Council of Churches (WCC) and the meetings of the World Communion of Reformed Churches (WCRC). Although the CWM does not have formal membership status in the WCRC, 30 of its 36 member churches are also members of the WCRC (Note: The only denominations that are members of the CWM but not members of the WCRC are: 1. Cook Islands Christian Church; 2. Church of Christ in Malawi; 3. Nauru Congregational Church; 4. Congregational Union of New Zealand; 5. United Church in Papua New Guinea; and 6. Congregational Federation.), which is why the Council acts as a missionary partner to several of these denominations.

== Members ==
In 2025, the organization had 36 members:

Country	Denominational sub-family	Denomination	Number of congregations	Number of members	Year
South Africa	Congregationalists	United Congregational Church of Southern Africa	1,000	1,500,000	2024
South Africa	Presbyterians	Uniting Presbyterian Church in Southern Africa	473	500,000	2006
Bangladesh	United Churches (Presbyterians and Anglicans)	Church of Bangladesh	115	22,600	2022
China (People's Republic of China)	United Churches (Presbyterians, Congregationalists, Baptists, and Methodists)	Hong Kong Council of the Church of Christ in China	74	36,000	2016
Cook Islands	Congregational	Cook Islands Christian Church	~80	~18,000	2024
South Korea	Presbyterians	Presbyterian Church of Korea (TongHap)	9,446	2,190,919	2024
Guyana	Congregational	Guyana Congregational Union	40	2,452	2006
India	United Churches (Presbyterians, Anglicans, Methodists and Disciples of Christ)	Church of North India	4,600	2,300,000	2025
India	United Churches (Presbyterians, Congregationalists, Continental Reformed, Anglicans, and Methodists)	Church of South India	10,114	5,000,000	2020
India	Presbyterians	Presbyterian Church of India	4,054	1,605,423	2024
Jamaica	United Churches (Presbyterians, Congregationalists, and Disciples of Christ)	United Church in Jamaica and the Cayman Islands	194	14,000	2025
Kiribati	United Churches (Presbyterians, Congregationalists, and Anglicans)	Kiribati Uniting Church	136	25,216	2020
Madagascar	Continental Reformed	Church of Jesus Christ in Madagascar	7,200	6,000,000	2016
Malaysia	Presbyterians	Presbyterian Church in Malaysia	100	7,000	2004
Malawi	Churches of Christ	Church of Christ in Malawi	4,000	75,000	1991
Mauritius	Presbyterians	Presbyterian Church of Mauritius	5	501	2011
Myanmar	Presbyterians	Presbyterian Church of Myanmar	245	33,000	2001
Nauru	Congregational	Nauru Congregational Church	7	7,000	2006
New Zealand	Presbyterians	Presbyterian Church of Aotearoa New Zealand	259	18,348	2023
New Zealand	Congregational	Congregational Union of New Zealand	13	670	2019
Netherlands	United Churches (Continental Reformed and Lutheran)	Protestant Church in the Netherlands	1,487	1,387,000	2025
Papua New Guinea	United Churches (Presbyterians and Methodists)	United Church in Papua New Guinea	2,600	748,961	2011
"French Polynesia"	Congregational	Maohi Protestant Church	104	135,500	2019
United Kingdom	United Churches (Presbyterians, Congregationalists, and Disciples of Christ)	United Reformed Church	1,242	35,844	2022
United Kingdom	Presbyterians	Presbyterian Church of Wales	471	12,938	2023
United Kingdom	Congregational	Union of Welsh Independents	390	20,000	2006
United Kingdom	Congregational	Congregational Federation	235	10,883	2004
Solomon Islands	United Churches (Presbyterians and Methodists)	United Church in the Solomon Islands	191	50,000	2006
Samoa	Congregational	Congregational Christian Church of Samoa	325	70,000	2006
American Samoa	Congregational	Congregational Christian Church in American Samoa	113	20,000	2006
Singapore	Presbyterians	Presbyterian Church in Singapore	37	21,000	2020
Taiwan	Presbyterians	Presbyterian Church in Taiwan	1,271	257,550	2020
Trinidad and Tobago	Presbyterians	Presbyterian Church of Trinidad and Tobago	108	40,000	2004
Tuvalu	Congregational	Christian Church of Tuvalu	18	9,682	2012
Vanuatu	Presbyterian	Presbyterian Church of Vanuatu	400	65,000	2018
Zambia	United Churches (Presbyterians and Methodists)	United Church of Zambia	1,060	4,000,000	2024
Global	Council for World Mission		52,151	26,240,487	2004-2024

== Programmes ==
The Council has four permanent programmes – financial sharing, personnel sharing, mission development and education, and communication – which give encouragement, provide training opportunities, share information and give practical help to the churches' mission programs.

Member churches carry out theological education, pastoral ministry, healthcare (including HIV/AIDS care), counselling and community work. CWM offers training programmes, missiological research and scholarship to its members.

The ‘Partners in Mission’ (PIM) programme works to share mission personnel between member churches.

The 'Face to Face' program offers theology students overseas placements of up to two months. In 2008, CWM launched a partnership with St George's College to operate a temporary 'Face to Face' program in Israel. Partner countries for this programme include the US, Fiji, India and Zambia.

== Archives ==
The Archive of the Council for World Mission is held at the School of Oriental and African Studies, London. They also hold the archives for LMS, CMS and EPBM.
