= Xixia District Christian Church =

Christian church in China

Xixia District Christian Church (simplified Chinese: 西夏区基督教堂; traditional Chinese: 西夏區基督教堂; pinyin: Xīxiàqū Jīdūjiàotáng), shortly Xixia Church, is located in Xixia District, Yinchuan City, the capital of Ningxia Hui Autonomous Region, China. It is one of the most representative Christian churches in Ningxia. The new church was built in 2000 and now has more than 500 believers and 20 gathering places. Every year, the church holds a birthday thanksgiving party for all its senior members over 70 years old.

== History ==
In 1877, Christianity Gospel was introduced to Ningxia for the first time by two missionaries of the China Inland Mission, G.F. Eston and George Parker. In 1885, the Yinchuan missionary station was established. In 1889, the first batch of Christians in Ningxia were baptized, a total of four people.

In 1894, Swedish Pastor Niu went to Yinchuan City to preach. In 1901, he established the Inland Mission Gospel Hall in Ningxia.

In 1943, the Ningxia Chinese Christian Church was established.

After the founding of the People's Republic of China in 1949, the Ningxia Christian community launched the Three-Self Patriotic Movement and actively participated in national construction.

In 1955, there were a total of 200 members of the Chinese Christian Church in Yinchuan City and the Ningxia Christian Church (Inland Mission).

In 1985, there was only one Christian activity site in Yinchuan with 235 believers.

In 2000, "Xixia District Christian Church" was established, which was the first formal church rebuilt in Yinchuan City after the Cultural Revolution.

As of 2016, Xixia Church has established more than 20 gathering places with over 500 members.

== Religious activities ==
Normal activities include Sunday worships, morning prayer meetings, youth gatherings, etc.

The church has a tradition of helping students and respecting the elderly. Every year, it distributes scholarships to needy students and holds birthday appreciation parties for senior members over 70 years old.

Another feature is that more than 20 gathering places have been established and are still growing. This is mainly to facilitate the church members (especially the elderly) to attend gatherings and worship nearby and to prevent the influence of heretical ideas.

== Church address ==
Address: No. 1, Yulin Lane, Huanghe West Road, Xixia District, Yinchuan City, Ningxia; Tel: 086-0951-2029977
