= Rhiwderin Congregational Chapel =

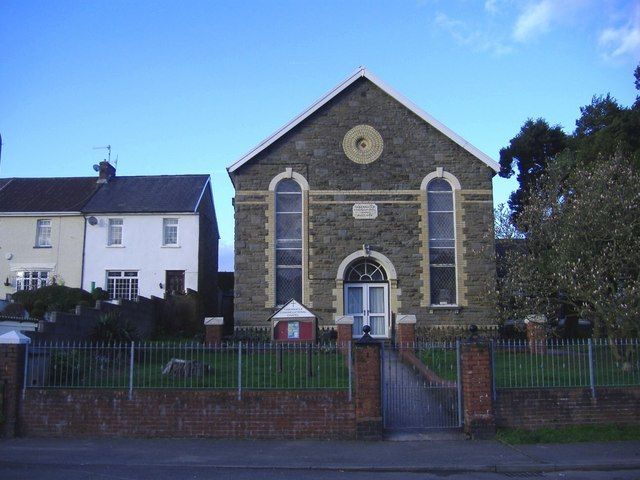
- Rhiwderin Congregational Chapel
- 51.5809°N 3.0678°W
- Denomination: Congregational

History
- Status: Active
- Founded: 1872

Architecture
- Completed: 1884

Rhiwderin Congregational Chapel is a Nonconformist chapel in Rhiwderin, Newport, Wales.

The chapel was founded in 1872, originally meeting in a stable nearby. In the following decade, Viscount Tredegar donated land on which the chapel was built in 1884. The schoolroom followed in 1903–4. Lord Tredegar later funded two stained glass windows for the church in 1910.

The chapel is affiliated with the Congregational Federation.
