= World Evangelical Congregational Fellowship =

Global association of churches

- Abbreviation: WECF
- Type: Fellowship
- Orientation: Evangelical Protestant
- Polity: Congregational
- Region: Worldwide
- Origin: 1986; Sussex, England
- Congregations: 1,447
- Members: 162,707
- Official website: cong-wecf.org

The World Evangelical Congregational Fellowship (WECF) is a global association of evangelical Christian Congregational Churches, from various national associations around the world, which is united by a common belief in the lordship of Jesus Christ and the authority of the Bible, as well as by its common desire for evangelism.

== Origins ==
In 1891, in London, the International Congregational Council (ICC) was founded. This body represented, for many decades, congregational unity throughout the world.

However, in the 20th century, Liberal Theology and Ecumenism spread among Congregational churches throughout the world. Many Congregational churches, as a result, have abandoned the doctrine of Biblical inerrancy and also the distinctives of Congregationalism.

In the 1960s and 1970s, several congregational groups around the world merged with Presbyterian and/or Methodist and/or Anglican groups, forming denominations such as the Igreja Evangélica Presbiteriana de Portugal, Uniting Church in Australia, United Church of Canada, Church of North India, Church of South India and United Reformed Church.

In 1970, the ICC was already formed by several united churches, which were also members of the Alliance of the Reformed Churches holding the Presbyterian System (ARCPS). Thus, this year, the ICC and ARCPS merged, giving rise to the World Alliance of Reformed Churches (WARC).

WARC was formed by several churches that defended Liberal Theology and many congregational denominations preferred not to join the organization.

Consequently, the remaining Congregational denominations, which refused to unite with other denominations as well as refused to participate in the World Alliance of Reformed Churches came together to form a new international organization for the group.

The idea for the WECF began at a series of annual meetings of the Conservative Congregational Christian Conference in 1983, when a number of international delegates at the American meetings expressed an interest in solidifying relationships with other evangelical congregationalists across the globe. A constitutional framework for the Fellowship was ultimately agreed upon, and the WECF held its inaugural assembly in October 1986, in Sussex, England.

== Statistics ==
According to a denomination census released in 2020, it has 18 denominations members in 17 countries.

== Organization ==
The WECF is overseen by a number of executive officers from different nations: including a President, vice-president, Treasurer, Secretary, and several members-at-large. It presently meets triennially, with a smaller-scale mid-term meeting, every year and a half.

== Members ==
List of Members of the World Evangelical Congregational Fellowship (as of 2025):

Country	Denomination	Number of congregations	Number of members	Year
South Africa	Evangelical Fellowship of Congregational Churches (South Africa)	20	3,000	2025
Argentina	Evangelical Congregational Church in Argentina (Note: It is also a member of the World Communion of Reformed Churches.)	120	6,000	2021
Australia	Fellowship of Congregational Churches	28	1,500	2004
Brazil	Union of Congregational Churches in Brazil	436	50,000	2004
Brazil	Alliance of Evangelical Congregational Churches of Brazil	91	-	2016
Bulgaria	Union of Evangelical Congregational Churches in Bulgaria	34	5,000	2006
Canada	Congregational Christian Churches in Canada	30	7,000	2004
United States of America	Conservative Congregational Christian Conference	301	51,112	2020
Philippines	National Association of Congregational Churches	-	-	-
India	Association of Evangelical Churches (India)	200	35,000	2017
North Macedonia	Union of Evangelical Congregational Churches in Macedonia	-	-	-
Federated States of Micronesia	Chuuk Congregational Church of Christ in the Federated States of Micronesia	-	-	-
Myanmar	Evangelical Churches in Myanmar	-	-	-
Nepal	Evangelical Congregational Churches of Nepal	-	-	-
New Zealand	Congregational Union of New Zealand	13	670	2019
Portugal	Union of Evangelical Congregational Churches in Portugal	23	325	2004
United Kingdom	Evangelical Fellowship of Congregational Churches	125	-	2024
United Kingdom and Ireland	Congregational Union of Ireland	26	3,100	2004
Guam	Congregational Churches in Guam and Saipan (Note: Associate Member.)	-	-	-
'Global	World Evangelical Congregational Brotherhood	1,447	162,707	2004-2024
