= Union of Welsh Independents =

Christian denomination in Wales

- Undeb yr Annibynwyr Cymraeg
- Logo of the Union of Welsh Independents (Undeb yr Annibynwyr Cymraeg).
- Classification: Protestant
- Orientation: Reformed
- Polity: Congregationalist
- Llywydd (president): Owain Llŷr Evans
- Secretary General: Dyfrig Rees
- Distinct fellowships: Congregational Federation
- Associations: World Communion of Reformed Churches, International Congregational Fellowship, Council for World Mission, World Council of Churches; Cytûn
- Region: Wales
- Congregations: 400 (2021)
- Members: 31,000 (2006)
- Official website: http://www.annibynwyr.org/

The Union of Welsh Independents (Welsh: Undeb yr Annibynwyr Cymraeg) is a Reformed Congregationalist denomination in Wales.

== History ==
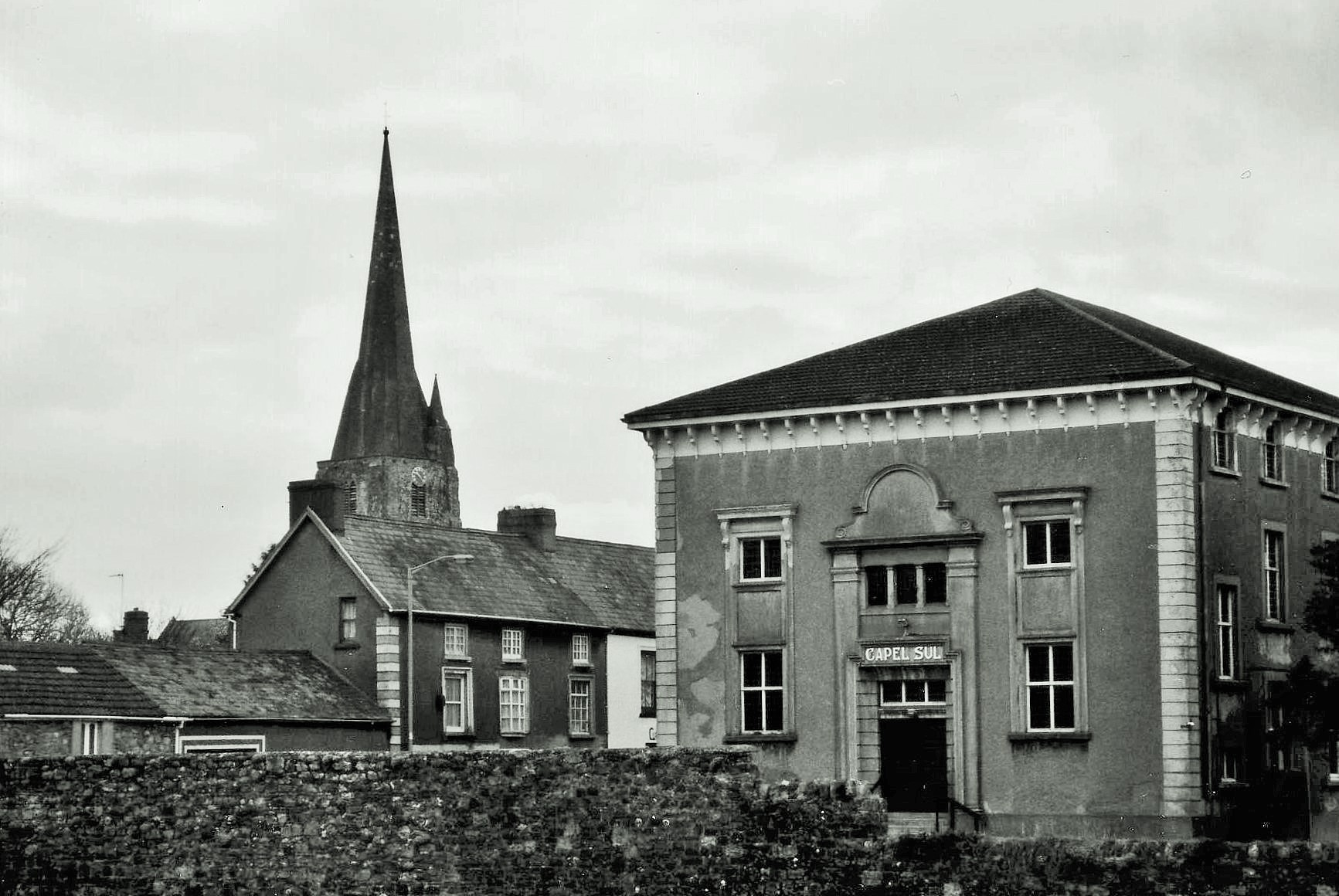
St Mary's Church (Anglican) and Capel Sul (Independent) in Kidwelly

Welsh Congregational churches or Independents stand in the Puritan tradition. The first Congregational congregation was founded at Llanfaches, Monmouthshire, in 1639. Early founders were in the Puritan tradition. Later, several churches were founded and formed separate denominations. They embraced different theological positions. Finally, the denomination was founded in 1872 as a voluntary association of churches. It was called Independent because each congregation claims to be under the authority of Christ. Individual congregations cooperate through associations. Now the Union works through six departments: finance, mission, ministry, education, churches, communication. The Union churches have much in common with other free churches in Wales. Ministers can freely move their ministry among them. The Union's council met once a year. The Union is a free and voluntary body, its aims to help to make churches a fellowship that serve Jesus Christ. The church has high emphasis on preaching the Gospel, and education, empowering church members. The latest strategy is the Welsh Independents Development Programme.

== Statistics ==
In 2006 the Union of Welsh Independents had 16 associations of churches, 450 congregations, 31,000 members and about 107 ministers. Its worship services are held primarily in the Welsh language.

According to the latest statistics in 2021 it had over 400 congregations. The president is Owain Llŷr Evans.

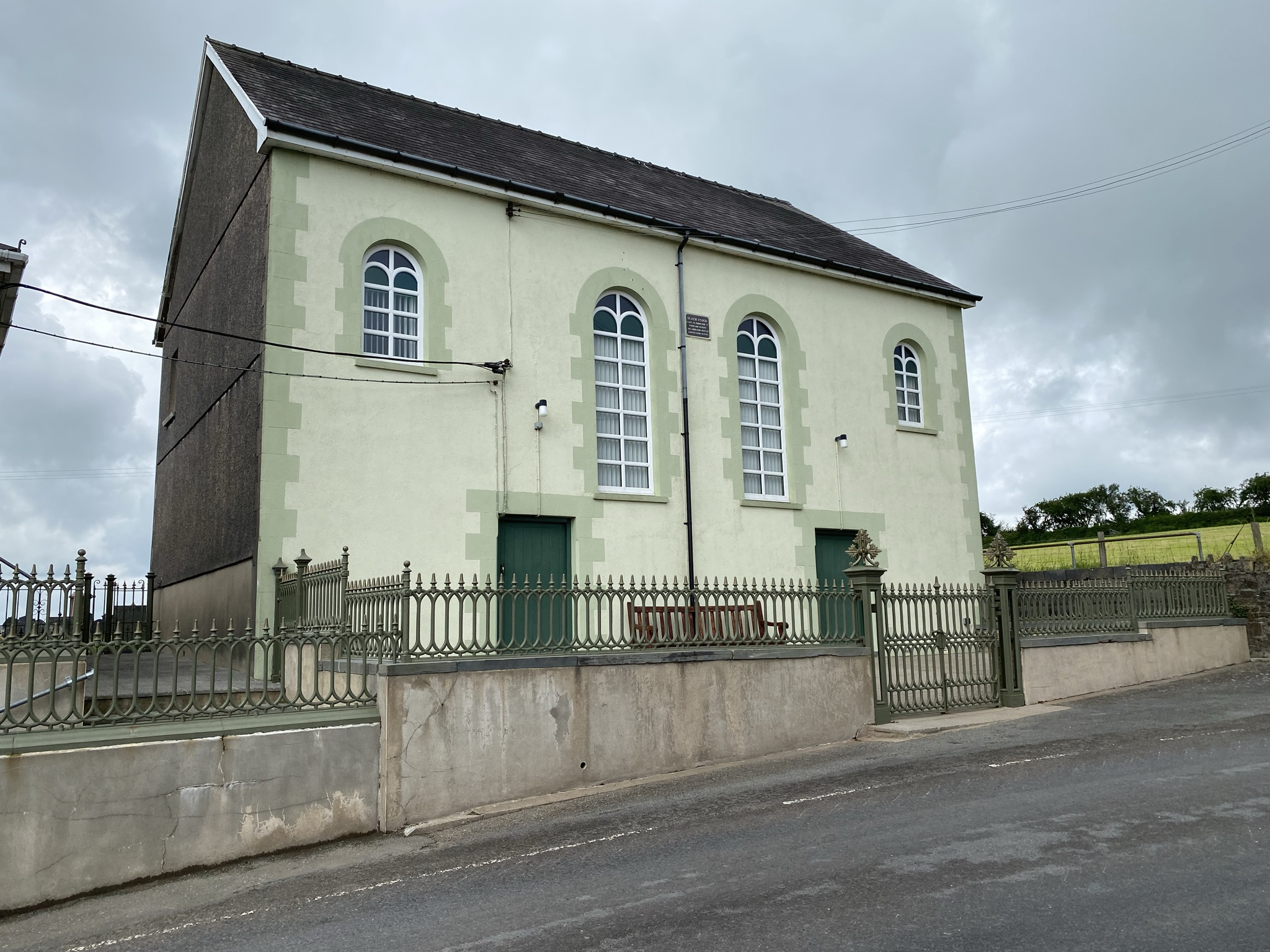
Blaen y coed Welsh Independent Church

== Interchurch relations ==
The Union is a member of the World Communion of Reformed Churches, the International Congregational Fellowship, Council for World Mission and the World Council of Churches.

It has friendly relations with the Congregational Federation.

== Bibliography ==
- Jones, R. Tudur (1975). YR UNDEB. Hanes Undeb yr Annibynwyr Cymraeg 1872-1972. Gwasg John Penry.
