= Covenanted Churches in Wales =

A covenant was signed in 1975 between the Church in Wales, the Methodist Church of Great Britain, the Presbyterian Church of Wales (PCW), the United Reformed Church (URC) and some covenanted Baptist churches. These Covenanted Churches work together on issues of faith and worship and are pledged to ever-closer ecumenical cooperation. The Commission of the Covenanted Churches is committed to the "development of new ecumenical congregations and churches", and the "preparation of agreed liturgies for communion and baptism". Proposals in the early 2000s for the creation of an "Ecumenical Bishop" were rejected by the smaller denominations. The Covenanted Churches are also members of Cytûn.

== See also ==
- Cytûn
- Churches Together in Britain and Ireland
- United and uniting churches
