= Charles Burt (politician) =

British solicitor and local politician

Sir Charles Burt (15 July 1832 – 5 March 1913) a solicitor and local politician in Richmond, Surrey. He was elected to the first Surrey County Council in 1889 and was Mayor of Richmond in 1892–93. He campaigned for the preservation of several important local open spaces, assisting in the purchase of Marble Hill House and in protecting the view from Richmond Hill.

== Early life ==
John Charles Burt was born on 15 July 1832 in Langport, Somerset, the son of George and Mary Ann Burt.

== Career ==
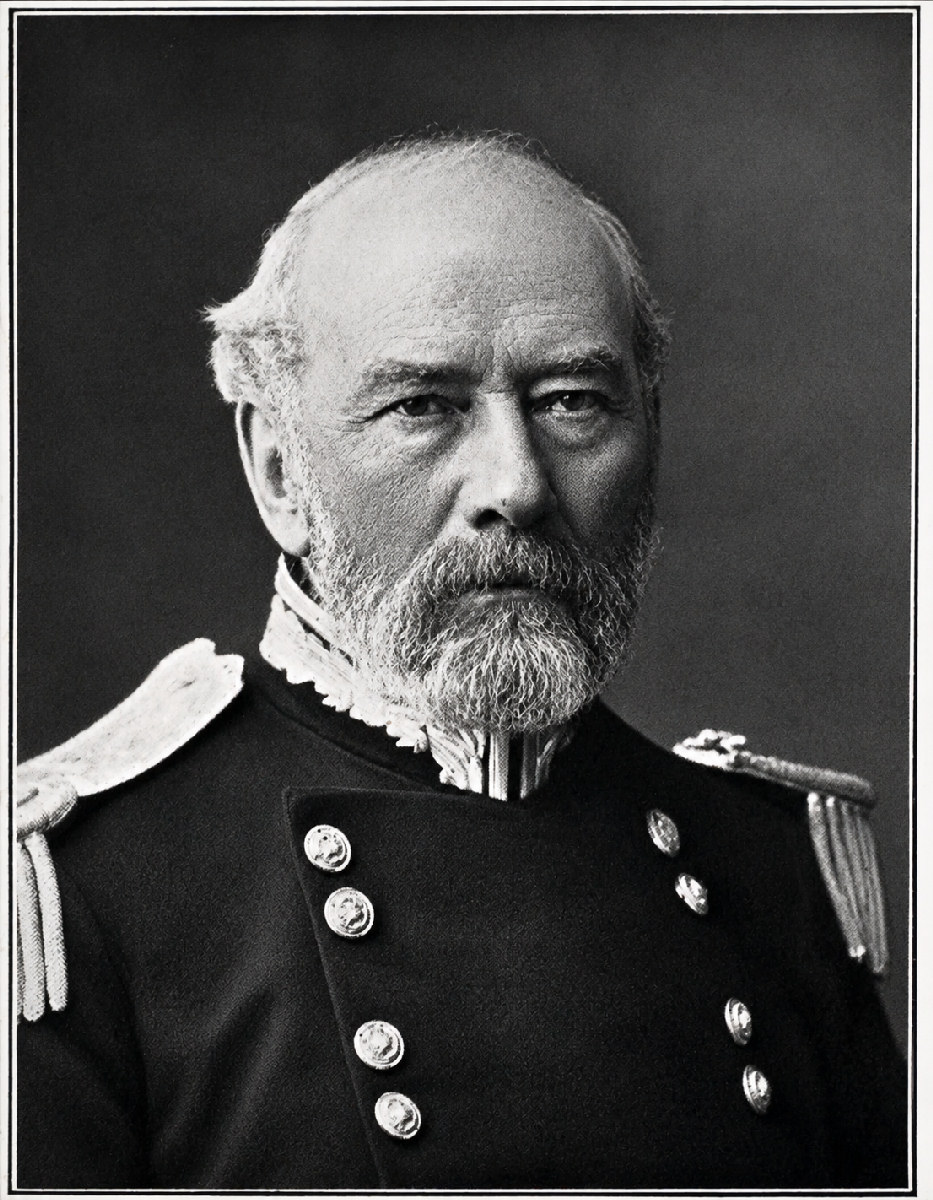
Sir Charles Burt

He moved to London about 1845 where he joined the solicitors Bircham & Co. in 1860, becoming a partner in 1868. He lived in Richmond from 1858 where he was a member of the local Vestry from 1861. He opposed Southwark and Vauxhall Waterworks Company plans to take over the town's supply. After the dispute, in 1875, the water company appointed his firm as their solicitors, which caused problems, and in 1877 they disconnected the supply because the Vestry were setting up their own water works. He became a senior partner of Bircham & Co., retiring in 1889.

He became a board member of the Royal Free Hospital in 1889, becoming chairman in 1895 and treasurer in 1901.

Burt was elected to the first Surrey County Council in 1889. When Richmond was first incorporated as a borough in 1890, replacing the vestry, he was elected. Burt was the third Mayor of Richmond (1892–1893), and remained an alderman until his death. He was a Deputy lieutenant and alderman of Surrey. In addition he was a member of the Thames Conservancy and a member of the Metropolitan Water Board. He was chairman of the Richmond Main Sewage Board responsible for the new works at Mortlake.

Through his efforts the Richmond Lock and weir were built. The preservation of the view from Richmond Hill was mostly his work. The view from Richmond Hill was protected with the passing of the Richmond, Petersham and Ham Open Spaces Act 1902, restricted the building on the land in front of the hill.

He succeeded in raising the money for the purchase of Marble Hill House, which was under threat of demolition.

He was knighted in 1908.

He was an active member of the Liberal Party, twice standing for election to parliament, at Southampton (1892) and at Kingston-upon-Thames (1895).

== Publications ==
The Richmond Vestry. Notes of its history and operations from 1614 to 1890. (Borough of Richmond. The charter of incorporation). Richmond. (1890).

== Personal life ==
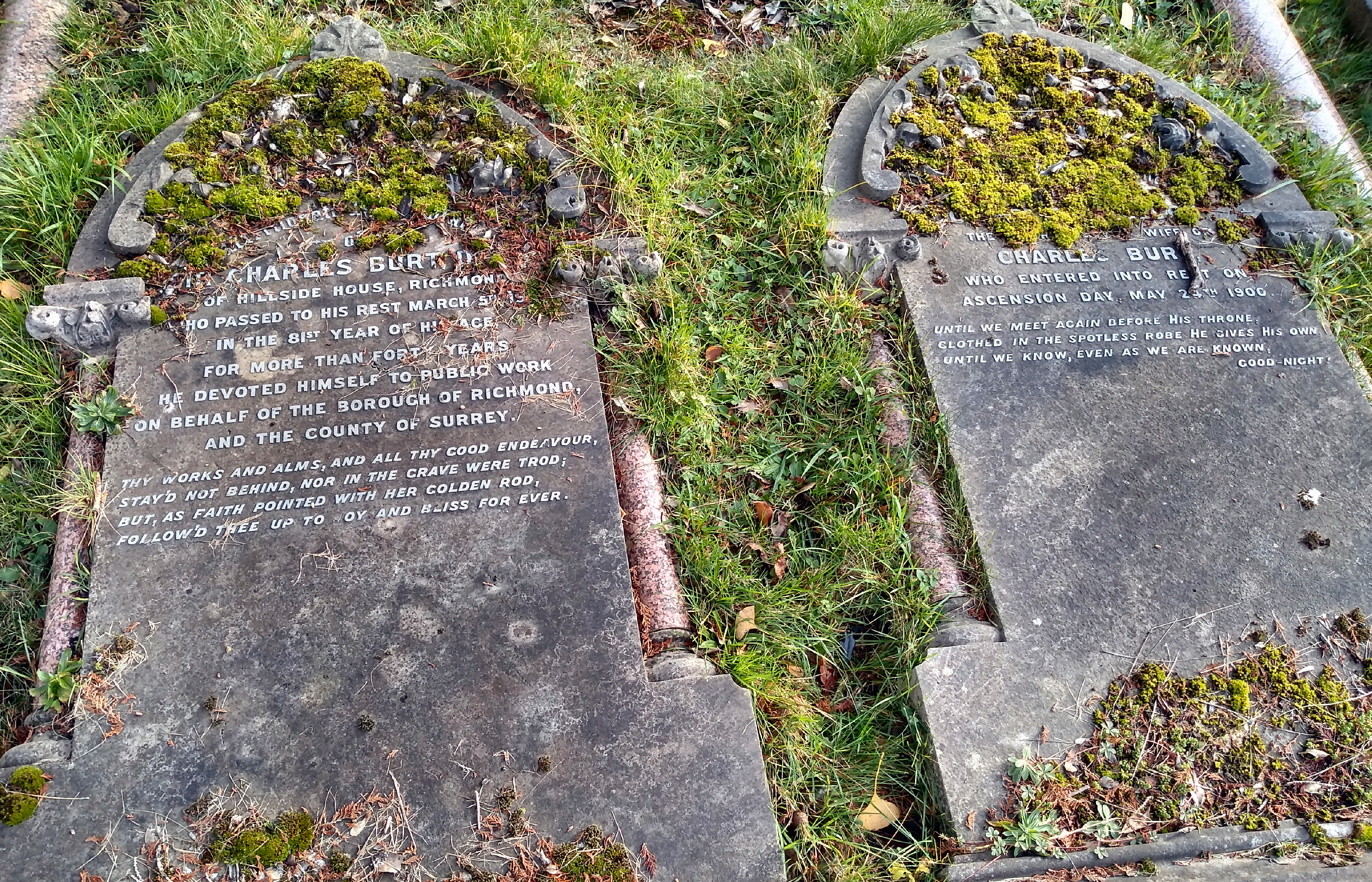
Headstones for Sir Charles Burt and his wife at Richmond Cemetery

He was a member of the Vineyard Congregational Church in Richmond and, in 1898, helped in setting up St Paul's Congregational Church in north Richmond.

He married Christiana Ellen Lewis (b. 1830, Castle Rising, Norfolk, d. 1900) in 1854 at St Pancras, London. He died on 5 March 1913 at Hillside House, Richmond, and is buried in Richmond Cemetery together with his wife. His headstone records that "For more than forty years he devoted himself to public work on behalf of the Borough of Richmond and the County of Surrey."
