= Dongxinxiang Church =

Church in Xi'an, China

Dongxinxiang Church, or Dongxin Lane Church (simplified Chinese: 东新巷礼拜堂; traditional Chinese: 東新巷禮拜堂; pinyin: Dōngxīnxiàng Lǐbàitáng; lit. 'east new lane church'), is located in the middle of Dongxin Lane, Dongguan, Xi'an City, Shaanxi Province, China. It was the first Christian Protestant church built in Xi'an, an ancient capital of China.

== History ==
In 1890, a large number of Shandong immigrants arrived in Xi'an. Among them, there were many Christians, half of whom belonged to the British Baptist Church. Then the first Protestant church in Xi'an was founded on the Dongxin Lane by missionary Arthur Gostick Shorrock from the British Baptist Church. The church was named as "Salvation Church" (救世堂). It had 9 rooms.

In 1909, as the believers increased, the church was reconstructed and renamed as "Jesus Church" (耶稣堂). The new church compound was spacious and bright. There were many attached buildings, including the Shaanxi headquarters of the British Baptist Church, missionary residences, as well as a school and a hospital. The church later joined the Chinese Christian Church and became the Chang'an Church of the Shaanxi General Assembly.

In 1958, Xi'an Christians implemented joint worship, and Dongxinxiang Church was one of the four churches preserved.

During the Cultural Revolution, the church was occupied by the Xi'an Hoisting Motor Factory and used as a warehouse.

In 1984, the properties were returned to the church. After a renovation, religious activities were resumed in the church, accommodating up to 500 people for each worship service, up to the present day.

In 1998, Dongxinxiang Church was listed as a cultural relic protection site by the Xi'an City government. And in 2014, it was promoted to a Shaanxi Provincial-level cultural relic protection unit.

== Architecture ==
The Dongxin Lane Church is located at No. 55, Dongxin Lane in Dongguan, Xi'an City, covering an area of 16 mu (around 10,667 square meters). There are no visible pillars in the hall, and the entire structure is supported by the stone pillars on the side walls, making it exceptionally spacious and bright. The main building has seven rooms, laid in a Latin cross plan, facing east, with a construction area of 326 square meters. It has an arched wooden frame structure and a simple agricultural style. There is an altar at the west end and a red cross at the top of the front wall. The church can accommodate 500 people to worship together.

There were many attached buildings, including the Shaanxi headquarters of the British Baptist Church, missionary residences, a school and a hospital.

== International Activities ==
Dongxin Lane Church has received guests from many countries, including the former German President Roman Herzog and his wife, who visited the church along with more than 80 people in November 1996, and worshipped here.
