= Zhongshan Taiping Church =

Church in Guangdong, China

Zhongshan Taiping Church (Chinese: 中山太平堂; pinyin: Zhōngshān Tàipíngtáng; lit. 'Zhongshan Peace Church'), full name Zhongshan City Christian Taiping Church, abbreviation Taiping Church, is located in Zhongshan, the hometown of Christian Sun Yat-sen in China. Taiping Church was built in 1928, a replica of a Gothic building with an area of about 500 square meters, and is now the main Protestant church in the city.

== History ==
As early as 1819, Brother Cai Gao preached in Zhongshan. In 1874, a house on Taiping Road, Shiqi Town, was rented to serve as the first church in Zhongshan.

In 1905, Christians Guo Quan and Ma Yongcan purchased a piece of land to build a church in Huawang Lane outside the west gate of Shiqi. The church was completed in 1906 and named "Xiangshan Presbyterian Self-care Church", which belonged to the Chinese Christian Church. This is the predecessor of Taiping Church.

In 1918, a sub-church was built in Shayong, which was called the Liangdu First Branch of the "Xiangshan Presbyterian Self-care Church". In 1920, another church was built in Shaxi and was called the Longdu Second Branch of the "Xiangshan Presbyterian Self-care Church".

In 1922, the number of believers increased beyond the capacity of the building in Huawang Lane. Ma Yingbiao and Guo Quan purchased the Gaojiaji land section from the Shiqi Chamber of Commerce to build a new church. In 1928, the new "Taiping Church" was completed with a total construction cost of over 50,000 yuan. It was the largest Christian church in Zhongshan. The buildings were in Gothic style, with the chapel in the front and the Guangzhi School (now Gaojiaji Primary School) in the back.

During political movements in China after the 1950s, Taiping Church was occupied by factories and units until the end of the Cultural Revolution. In the autumn of 1980, the church resumed religious activities. It was the first Christian church in Zhongshan City to resume gatherings. Li Hufa was the senior pastor and Mai Minying was the female preacher. Subsequently, Zhongshan City successively restored or established Shaxi Longdu Church, Shayong Liangdu Church, Sanxiang Church, Xiaolan Church, etc. During this period, Taiping Church also trained a group of evangelists who later served in various (branch) churches.

In 1989, Pastor Fan Hongen returned to serve in Taiping Church upon graduation from Wuhan Central South Theological Seminary, and in 1995 he was promoted to senior pastorship. In 1999, Fan Qiaoer became the pastor. And in 2009, another pastor and two evangelists joined the church.

== Church activities ==
Taiping Church currently has four worship services on Sunday, each attended by more than 800 people. There are the women's choir, the evergreen choir, the youth choir and the children's choir. The church also offers a number of courses, including Million Leaders, Volunteer Training, New Believers' Study, and other courses. And there are more than a dozen fellowships including the youth fellowship, couples fellowship, and women's fellowship.

== Social care ==
In addition to preaching the gospel of God and pastoring believers, care for the society and people's livelihood is also an important mission of Taiping Church. It has donated money and materials to the victims of the Lechang disaster area in Shaoguan and the Wenchuan earthquake. In 2011, on behalf of the Zhongshan Church Association, it supported the poverty alleviation work of Shizheng Village in Lufeng County. In recent years, it has been donating clothes to the poor children in Gansu Province.

== Architecture ==
Taiping Church has a building area of about 500 square meters in a combination of Chinese and Western styles. The main hall was built in 1928, in the architectural style of Gothic church and is divided into upper and lower floors. It can accommodate more than 400 people at a time. The benches in the hall are all made of solid wood, which are very durable and have been used to this day. The auxiliary hall was built in 1987 with a donation from Hong Kong believer Ou Bingguang. It is a two-story reinforced concrete building in ordinary Chinese style.

Address: No. 6, Gaojiaji, Taiping Road, Zhongshan City, Guangdong Province; Postal Code: 528402.
