= Margaret Benn, Viscountess Stansgate =

British theologian and advocate of women's rights

Margaret Eadie Benn, Viscountess Stansgate (née Holmes; 7 June 1897 – 21 October 1991) was a British theologian, the President of the Congregational Federation, and an advocate of women's rights.

== Life ==
Margaret Holmes was the daughter of Scottish politician Daniel Holmes. In her youth, in the 1920s, she was a member of the League of the Church Militant which was the predecessor of the Movement for the Ordination of Women and was rebuked by Randall Thomas Davidson, the Archbishop of Canterbury, for advocating the ordination of women.

Holmes had spent some of her time in Paris and learned French. She started school at the age of seven, when the family was back in Scotland. Margaret started at St Columba's School, Kilmacolm in Renfrewshire but moved to St. Mary's College when it was in Lancaster Gate, London, before moving due to disagreements with the school's high church headmistress.

Over the 20th century, many British congregationalists became convinced of the merits of ecumenical cooperation. The majority of Congregational churches moved to union with the Presbyterian Church of England in 1972, and the re-formed Association of Churches of Christ (in 1981). However, significant minorities did not share this conviction. A significant group left the Congregational Union on the formation of the Congregational Church to form the Evangelical Fellowship of Congregational Churches (EFCC); the major part that did not join the United Reformed Church became the Congregational Federation, a new association to promote and develop common interests. Margaret Benn became the Congregational Federation's first President, helping to shape its principle of 'unity within diversity'.

== Personal life ==
In 1920, she married the politician William Wedgwood Benn. The couple had four sons; the eldest, Michael, died in 1944 in a wartime accident, the Labour politician Tony Benn (1925–2014), David (1928–2017), a Russia specialist long with the BBC, and Jeremy, their last son, who was stillborn.

Margaret Benn's theology had a profound influence on her son Tony, as she taught him that the stories in the Bible were based around the struggle between the prophets and the kings and that he ought in his life to support the prophets over the kings, who had power, as the prophets taught righteousness.

== See also ==
- The Vineyard Life Church, Richmond
