= Christ Church New Southgate & Friern Barnet =

Church in Barnet, London, England

Coordinates: 51°36′54″N 0°08′55″W

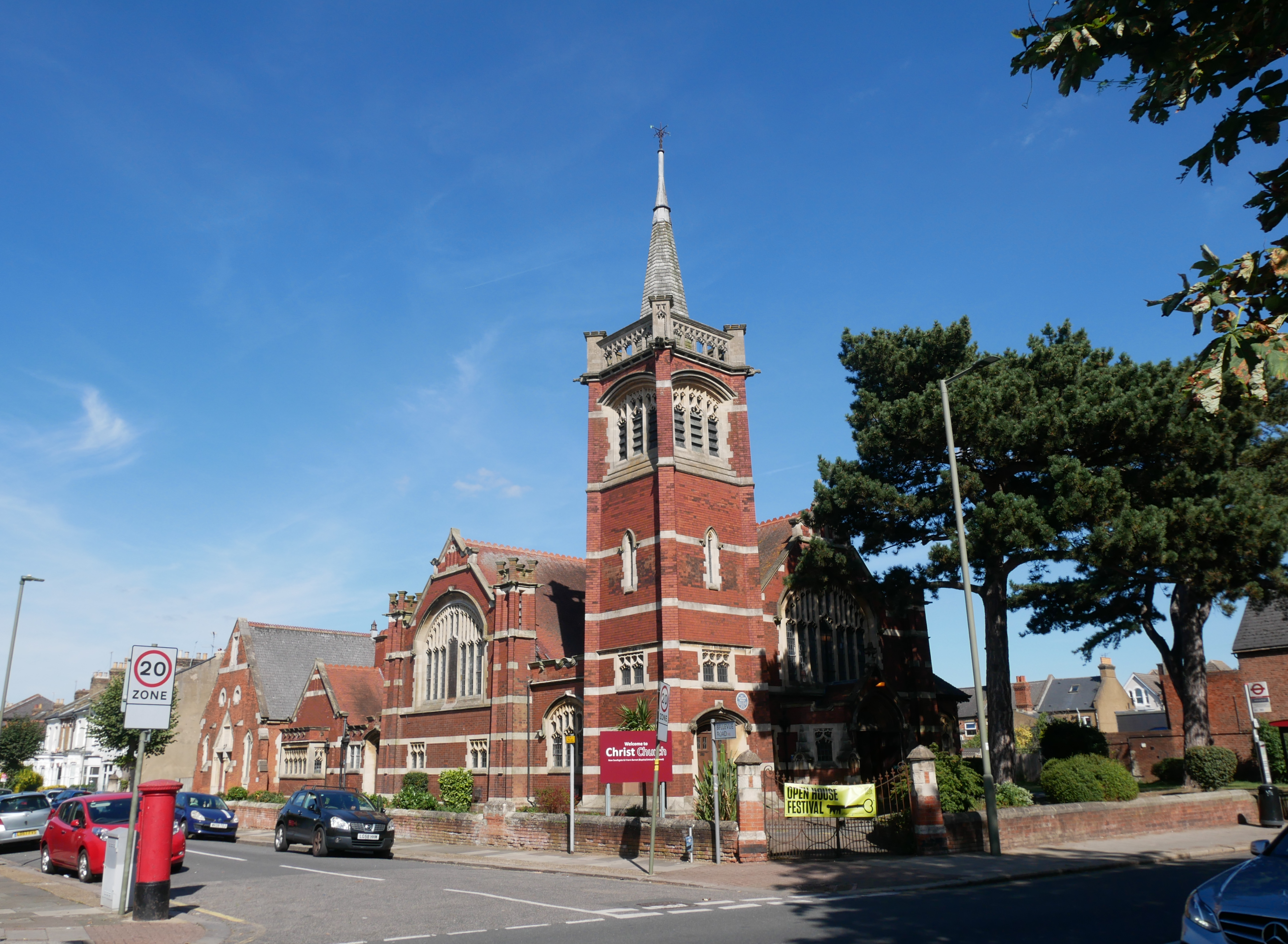
Christ Church New Southgate & Friern Barnet

Christ Church New Southgate & Friern Barnet is a Baptist United Reform church in Friern Barnet, London. The building is grade II listed with Historic England.

== History ==
This church was built in 1910 from designs by George Baines (1852–1934) for the Congregational Union in a perpendicular style using a greek cross floorplan. It features a tall, square tower in the south-west corner and has attached church rooms to the north. Its bulk materials were red brick, stone, white brick and terracotta dressings with coloured tile roofs.

In 1941 the new minister of the church was Elsie Chamberlain. She would go on to be a leader in the church and to help found the Congregational Federation in 1972.
