= Margaret Stanley-Wrench =

English poet and novelist (1916–1974)

Margaret Stanley-Wrench (1916 – 10 January 1974) was an English poet and novelist.

== Life ==
Stanley-Wrench was the daughter of William Stanley-Wrench (1879–1951) and his wife, Mollie (Violet Louisa Stanley-Wrench, née Gibbs; 1880–1966). Her mother was a novelist, cookery writer and journalist who used the byline "Mrs Stanley Wrench". Margaret attended Channing School in Highgate. As an undergraduate at Somerville College, Oxford, she was the winner of the Newdigate Prize in 1937, becoming only the fifth female winner. Her poems had already appeared in Oxford Poetry and would appear in Time and Tide magazine and in Augury: an Oxford Miscellany (1940). Her first poetry collection was published in 1938.

At Oxford, Stanley-Wrench met the poet Keith Douglas, who became a friend. She continued to write poetry, but after the war became better known as a children's writer. Her work was included in New Poems 1965, edited by Clifford Dyment.

A collection of Stanley-Wrench's papers, including manuscripts and correspondence, is held by the Lockwood Library of the University at Buffalo.

== Publications ==
=== Novels ===
- The Rival Riding Schools (1952)
- How Much For A Pony? (1955)
- The Conscience of a King: The story of Thomas More (1962)
- The Silver King: Edward the Confessor, the Last Great Anglo-Saxon Ruler (1966)
- Chaucer, Teller of Tales (1967)

=== Poetry ===
- News Reel and Other Poems (1938)
- A Tale for the Fall of the Year, and other poems (1959)

=== Drama ===
- The Splendid Burden (1954)
- Harlequin's Revenge (1955)
