= Gladys Mackenzie =

Scottish physicist

- Born: 2 May 1903; Edinburgh, Scotland
- Died: 1989 (aged 85–86); North York, Canada
- Other name: Gladys Isabel Harper
- Education: Craigmount School, Edinburgh
- Alma mater: University of Edinburgh (1919-1924)
- Spouse: Wallace Russell Harper
- Scientific career
- Fields: alpha particles X-ray monochromatization spectroscopy
- Institutions: University of Bristol; Newnham College, Cambridge; Queen Elizabeth College

Gladys Isabel Harper (née Mackenzie; 2 May 1903 – 1989) was a Scottish physicist who studied X-rays. She taught physics at Newnham College, Cambridge and was a research fellow of the University of Bristol.

She conducted research in X-ray physics, focusing on topics such as alpha particles, X-ray monochromatization, and spectroscopy. Her research of alpha particles proved that the theory of John Arthur Gaunt can also be applied to molecular hydrogen. She also developed through her research of crystal and slit systems a quantitative general theory for analysis of composite radiation and production of monochromatic beams. She attended the University of Edinburgh and graduated with an MA and BSc in mathematics and natural philosophy. She worked as an assistant at the University of Edinburgh for two years before being appointed to a lectureship in physics at Newnham College in Cambridge. She was also a physics lecturer at the University of Bristol and later a part-time lecturer in physics at Queen Elizabeth College in London, where she was named an honorary lecturer in 1970.

== Early life ==
Mackenzie was born on 2 May 1903 in Edinburgh to Helen Macgregor Martin, a teacher, and Lachlan Paterson Mackenzie, an iron founder. As a child, Mackenzie attended Craigmount School in Edinburgh from 1913 to 1919. She showed an early aptitude for mathematics after taking the Scottish Leaving Certificate Examinations. The first time she took the exam, she obtained a pass in lower mathematics, and the following year she received passes in higher-level mathematics, as well as in English, French and Latin.

== College ==
Mackenzie began her higher education at the University of Edinburgh in 1919. When she joined the university, she identified Church of Scotland as her religious denomination. While attending the university, she took a wide range of classes, both at ordinary and honours levels. She studied ordinary 1st and 2nd mathematics, chemistry, natural philosophy, and philosophy. She also took many honours-level courses, such as natural philosophy, mathematics, final natural philosophy, final mathematics, calculus, general analysis, heat, electricity I and II, general physics, higher algebra and geometry. She graduated on 17 July 1924 with an MA and BSc in mathematics and natural philosophy. As a result of the large number of honours-level classes she took, she graduated with First Class Honours.

Mackenzie joined the Edinburgh Mathematical Society while working at the University of Edinburgh. She was elected to the society on 6 March 1925 and left in 1930.

== Alpha particles ==
Mackenzie was a scholar at the University of Bristol from 1929 to 1930 before becoming a research fellow. From the beginning of her time at the University of Bristol in 1929 to her resignation in 1947, Mackenzie conducted her most note-worthy research. She started by researching methods of measuring the ranges of alpha particles. She tested ranges of alpha particles at varying initial velocities as they travelled through gases such as air, oxygen, nitrogen, argon and hydrogen and observed the stopping power of these gases as the particles travelled through them. She discovered a relationship between the range of the alpha particles and its initial velocity and proved that the theory of Gaunt for the stopping power of hydrogen atoms is also applicable for molecular hydrogen. This research was published in 1930.

== X-ray monochromatization and spectroscopy ==
Following this publication, she shifted her focus to the usage of crystal and slit systems for the purpose of X-ray monochromatization and spectroscopy. In regards to X-ray physics, crystal and slit systems are used for analysis of crystal structure, wave-length determination, spectroscopic analysis of composite radiation, and the production of monochromatic beams. The former two usages had already been thoroughly researched, so Mackenzie focused on the latter two which had not received as much attention. Her research developed a quantitative general theory for using crystal and slit systems for production of monochromatic beams and for analysis of composite radiation. She studied the effect of slit breadth, slit height, and crystal setting and determined that, according to her findings, the ideal design of slit systems is different from the design most commonly used.

== Personal life ==
Mackenzie married physicist Wallace Russell Harper on 14 March 1929. They had one son together.

Mackenzie worked as a part-time teacher at the Channing School in Highgate, London, from 1952 to 1958. She left this position when she was offered a part-time lectureship in physics at Queen Elizabeth College in London. She retired in 1970 following her husband's death and died in 1989.

== Selected publications ==
- Barkla, C. G.; Mackenzie, Gladys I. (1925), "The Coherence of Superposed X-Radiations", Nature, 115 (2903): 942, Bibcode:1925Natur.115..942B, doi:10.1038/115942a0, S2CID 4077057
- Barkla, C. G.; Mackenzie, Gladys I. (1926), "XLV. Notes on the superposition of X-rays and on scattering. The J phenomenon (Part III)", The London, Edinburgh, and Dublin Philosophical Magazine and Journal of Science, 1 (2): 542–553, doi:10.1080/14786442608633654
