= Cytûn =

Cytûn: Churches Together in Wales (Welsh: [kəˈtɨːn], "agreed"; English: /kəˈtiːn/) is a national ecumenical organisation of churches in Wales, formed in 1990. It is the successor to the former Council of Churches for Wales. Cytûn's offices are located in Richmond Road, Cardiff.

== Members ==
The full members of Cytûn are:

- Assemblies of God
- Baptist Union of Wales
- Church in Wales
- Congregational Federation
- German-speaking Lutheran Church in South Wales
- Methodist Church
- Presbyterian Church of Wales
- Religious Society of Friends (Quakers)
- Roman Catholic Church
- Salvation Army
- South Wales Baptist Association
- Union of Welsh Independents
- United Reformed Church

== Chief Executive ==
The Chief Executive of Cytûn is Aled Edwards. Previously he was the Cytûn National Assembly for Wales Liaison Officer. He was ordained in the Church in Wales Diocese of Bangor in 1979. For eight years (1985-93) he served as rector of a joint Anglican/Presbyterian Local Ecumenical Project on the Llŷn Peninsula in Gwynedd before becoming Vicar of the key Welsh language parish of Eglwys Dewi Sant in the centre of Cardiff. He also chairs a number of voluntary bodies including the Welsh Refugee Council and Displaced People in Action. He is also a Fellow of the Institute of Welsh Affairs. Aled Edwards succeeded Gethin Abraham-Williams.

Aled Edwards was succeeded in the post of National Assembly Liaison Officer by Geraint Hopkins, when the job title changed to Policy Officer.

== See also ==
- Action of Churches Together in Scotland
- Churches Together in Britain and Ireland
- Churches Together in England
- Conference of European Churches
- Covenanted Churches in Wales
- Irish Council of Churches
- Religion in Wales
- World Council of Churches
