= Evangelical Fellowship of Congregational Churches (South Africa) =

- Classification: Protestantism
- Orientation: Reformed
- Theology: Calvinism
- Polity: Congregational
- Associations: World Evangelical Congregational Fellowship
- Region: South Africa
- Origin: 1980; South Africa
- Separated from: United Congregational Church of Southern Africa
- Congregations: 20 (2025)
- Members: 3,000 (2025)

The Evangelical Fellowship of Congregational Churches (EFCC) is a Protestant denomination of Reformed Christianity orientation and Congregational governance in South Africa. It was officially organized on June 8, 1980, from a dissident group of the United Congregational Church of Southern Africa (UCCSA).

== History ==
In 1979, a group of conservative members of the United Congregational Church of Southern Africa separated from the denomination in opposition to the UCCSA's affiliation with the World Council of Churches. The main motivation for the schism was the rejection of ecumenism and the institutional participation of the mother church in the World Council of Churches, which these members understood as incompatible with their theological convictions.

After the separation, the dissenting congregations formally organized themselves on June 8, 1980, giving rise to the Evangelical Fellowship of Congregational Churches (South Africa).

During the transition from apartheid to democracy, representatives of the denomination participated in the work of the South African Truth and Reconciliation Commission, contributing to debates and public hearings on national reconciliation.

In 2025, the denomination had approximately 3,000 members distributed across 20 congregations in South Africa.

== Doctrine and structure ==
The Evangelical Fellowship of Congregational Churches adopts a Reformed Christianity theology, emphasizing the authority of Scripture, the sovereignty of God, and salvation by grace through faith. Its system of government is congregational, in which each local church is autonomous, cooperating voluntarily with the other congregations of the fellowship.

== Interchurch relations ==
The denomination is a member of the World Evangelical Congregational Fellowship as its only formal international association.

== See also ==
- Congregationalism
- Calvinism
