= Congregational Union of Australia =

Defunct Protestant denomination

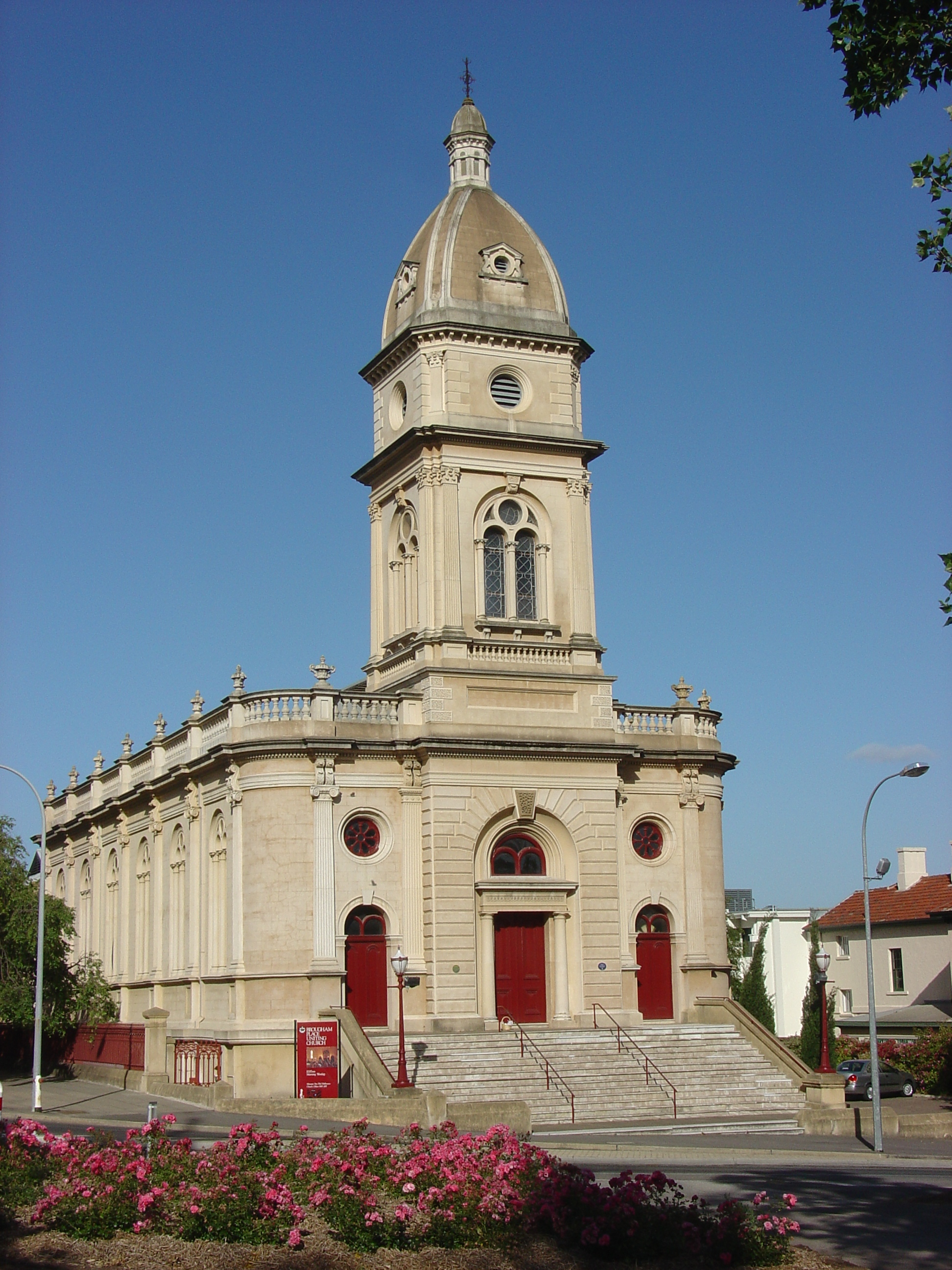
- Formerly North Adelaide Congregational Church; now known as Brougham Place Uniting Church
- Classification: Protestant
- Orientation: Calvinism
- Polity: Congregationalism
- Region: Australia
- Language: English
- Founder: Frederick Miller
- Origin: 1830; Hobart, Tasmania
- Branched from: Congregational Church, England
- Merged into: Uniting Church in Australia; Fellowship of Congregational Churches
- Defunct: 1977
- Congregations: 300

The Congregational Union of Australia was a Congregational denomination in Australia that stemmed from the Congregational Church in England as settlers migrated from there to Australia.

Congregational Churches existed in all states and territories of Australia at some time. The oldest Congregational Church was founded in Hobart in 1830 by Frederick Miller.

== History ==
One of the earliest and most influential Congregational ministers in early times was Thomas Q. Stow, who built the first church in South Australia.

Some of the first Congregational Churches established in each Australian state included the Pitt St church in Sydney, Stow Memorial Church (now Pilgrim Uniting) in Adelaide, Collins Street (now St Michael's) church in Melbourne, Trinity (now Trinity Uniting) in Perth, and National Memorial Church (now City Uniting) in Canberra.

The NSW branch of the denomination, the Congregational Union of New South Wales, was incorporated by an Act of the New South Wales Parliament, The Congregational Union Incorporation Act 1882.

The Congregational Church was the first Christian denomination in Australia to ordain women, with the first female ordained being Winifred Kiek in 1927.

== Dissolution ==
The Union dissolved in 1977 when the Uniting Church in Australia was formed. 260 of the congregations that had previously formed the Union joined the new Uniting Church. The Uniting Church union also included the Methodist Church of Australasia and the Presbyterian Church of Australia.

However, 40 other congregations that had previously formed the Union objected to joining the new Uniting Church and formed the Fellowship of Congregational Churches instead. In 1995, there was a split within that Fellowship, with some more ecumenically-minded congregations leaving to form the Congregational Federation of Australia.

Today, there are, therefore, three Christian organizations that can claim to be direct 'descendants' of the Union.
