= Kathleen Lloyd Jones =

Kathleen "Kitty" Lloyd Jones
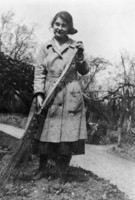
- Born: 4 June 1898; Oystermouth, Wales
- Died: 9 July 1978 (aged 80); Ascot, England
- Education: Channing School
- Alma mater: University of Reading (BSc)
- Occupations: Garden designer; nurserywoman

Kathleen Letitia "Kitty" Lloyd Jones (4 June 1898 – 9 July 1978) was a Welsh born garden designer and nurserywoman. She started out as a tutor in gardening and became a garden designer to wealthy clients in England, Scotland and France.

== Early life ==
Jones was born in Oystermouth, Wales and she was the penultimate child of ten children born to Dr Arthur Lloyd Jones and his wife. They lived in Oystermouth on the Gower peninsula in Wales in Rotherslade House. Her father was a surgeon and a physician and her brother in time would take over the medical practice. Her father became the Medical Officer of Health in 1900 and in 1901 the family and her fathers surgery moved to a house named Glyn-Cerrig.

In 1910 she went away to Channing School for Girls in Highgate, London. The school had been founded in 1885 by her great grandfather Robert Spears who was a Unitarian minister.

Jones left boarding school at 18 years old and studied for two years at the Royal Botanic Society at Regents Park. She received a first class diploma in the Society's Practical Gardening School.

Jones studied for the next six years at university. In 1924 she graduated from University of Reading with a Bachelor of Science degree in agriculture and horticulture. She also gained a national diploma of horticulture from the same university in 1925.

== Career ==
She was an exceptional student but the only work she could find was teaching the teenage daughter of Mrs Balfour. However this connection lead to work for Lady Gladstone who lived at Dale End House. Lady Gladstone would give Jones her first commission which was to design a 100 yard long curved border.

She was employed as a gardening tutor to Lady Bearstead who was designing the garden of her house, Upton House in Warwickshire. Jones lived in the grounds of Dane End House near Ware. She would stay at Upton house for a few nights and she would send long letters to Lady Bearstead about her gardens. The letters which were sent from 1931 to 1934 are extant and they include lists of plants that Lady Bearstead would approve before the gardener, Mr Tidman, enacted them.

She is credited today with the soft colours and strong colours at Upton Houses's gardens. She takes particular credit for converting some marshland into a bog garden which she envisaged based around a natural spring in the garden.

By the 1930s she was based at Binfield from where she took on commissions for garden design. She worked in southern England but she also had some work on the island of Gigha in Scotland and at least two commissions in northern France.

== Personal life ==
Jones died in Ascot, England in a nursing home in 1978.
