= Evangelical Churches Association (India) =

- Classification: Protestantism
- Orientation: Reformed
- Polity: Congregational
- Associations: Evangelical Congregational Church of India, World Evangelical Congregational Fellowship and World Communion of Reformed Churches
- Founder: Watkin Roberts
- Origin: 1952; Churachandpur, Manipur, India
- Congregations: 200 (2017)
- Members: 35,000 (2017)
- Official website: eca.org.in

The Evangelical Churches Association (ECA) is a Protestant Christian denomination of congregational orientation, founded in 1952, with headquarters in Chiengkonpang, Churachandpur, in the state of Manipur, northeastern India.

== History ==
In 1910, Welsh missionary Watkin Roberts began evangelistic work among the tribal people of the Senvon region of Churachandpur. Roberts founded the indigenous missionary agency Thadou-Kuki Pioneer Mission (TKPM), later renamed as North India General Mission (NEIGM). This movement was instrumental in planting local churches among the tribal population.

In 1952, the congregational churches founded by this missionary agency came together and formed the Association of Evangelical Churches.

Since then, associated churches have spread across northeastern India.

As of 2017, the association had about 200 churches and 35,000 members.

In 2020, the Government of India cancelled the denomination's license number under the Foreign Contributions Regulation Act (FCRA), preventing it from receiving any type of foreign donation. This came against a backdrop of restrictions on Christian churches in the country, with around 10,000 churches barred from receiving international aid.

In 2023, 17 churches of the denomination were burned in a wave of violence against Christians in northwest India.

== Doctrine ==
ECA professes a reformed evangelical faith, with emphasis on the following points:

- The authority of the Holy Scriptures as the only infallible rule of faith and practice;
- Belief in the Trinity: God the Father, Son and Holy Spirit;
- Jesus Christ as true God and true man, whose death and resurrection provide salvation;
- Salvation by grace, through faith in Christ;
- Practice of baptism and the Lord's Supper as ordinances instituted by Christ;
- Christian life marked by holiness, service and evangelism.

== Ecumenical Relations ==
ECA is a member of the Evangelical Congregational Church of India, the Evangelical Fellowship of India at the national level. At the international level, the ECA is a member of the World Communion of Reformed Churches and the World Evangelical Congregational Fellowship.

== See also ==
- Congregationalism
