= Kathryn Parsons =

British tech entrepreneur

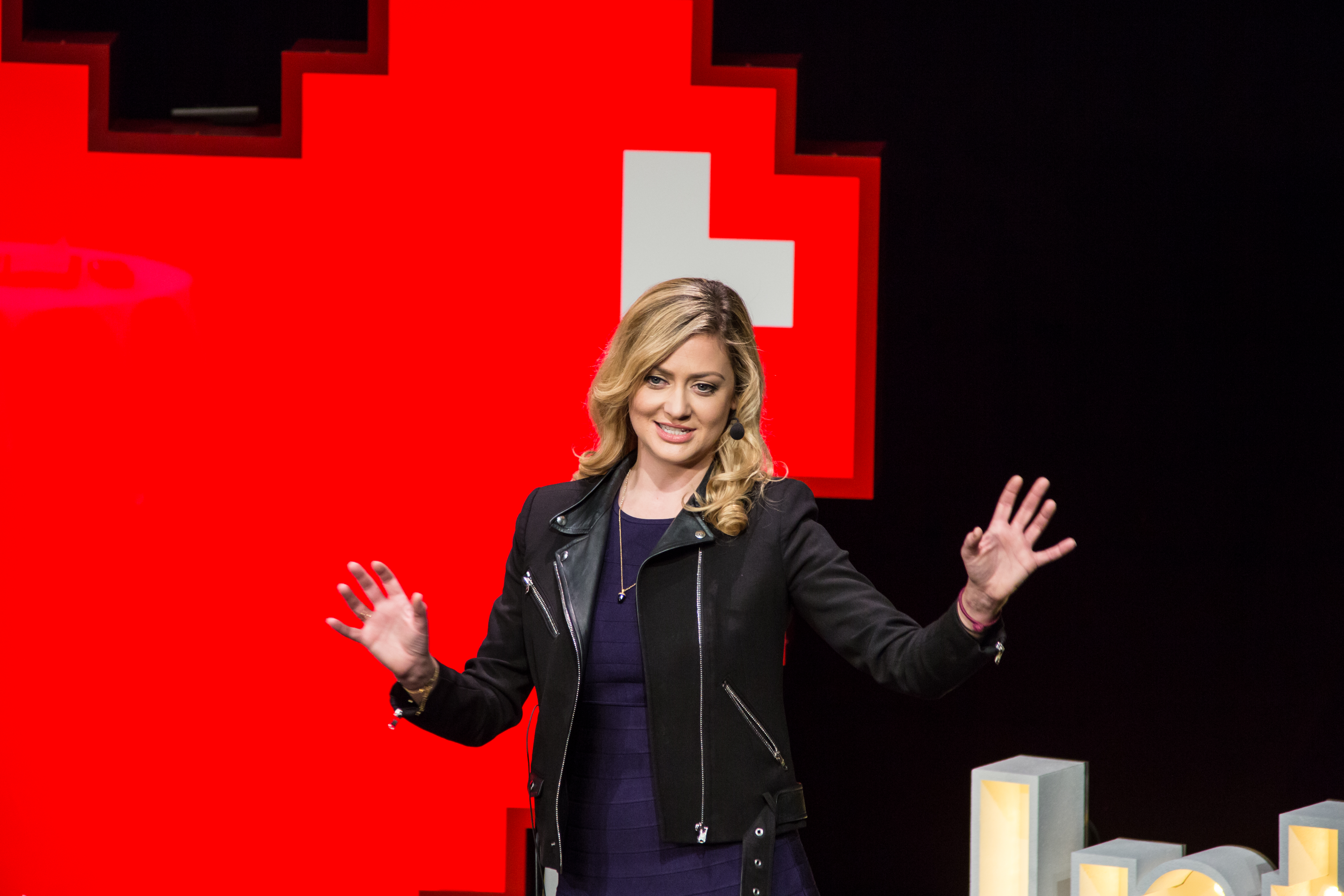
- Born: Kathryn Parsons; London, United Kingdom
- Education: Downing College, Cambridge
- Occupation: Co-CEO of Decoded
- Years active: 2011—present

Kathryn Parsons is a British tech entrepreneur. She is the co-founder and co-CEO of Decoded, a London-based "code and data education and digital transformation company". Decoded launched in 2011 with its signature one-day course which claimed to train participants without any background in computers to "code in a day". Today Decoded's Digital and Data Academies are delivered to thousands of executives and policymakers across the world.

== Early life and education ==
Kathryn Parsons grew up in Highgate and attended Channing School. She studied Classical Studies at Downing College, Cambridge. "A linguist by training, she has mastered Japanese, Latin, Ancient Greek and Mandarin. For Parsons, programming is just another language that anyone can learn."

== Honours and awards ==
Parsons successfully campaigned for coding to be included to the UK national curriculum making Britain one of the first countries in the world to do so.

She was awarded an MBE for Services to Education in the Queen’s New Year Honours.

Parsons sat on the Business Advisory Boards to Number Ten Downing Street and the London Mayors.

She joined the non-executive board of The Department for Business, Energy and Industrial Strategy from 2017-2020.

Kathryn currently sits on the board of HM Treasury’s Rose Review into Female Entrepreneurship which seeks to address the problem that women "receive less than 1 per cent of venture capital funding".

Parsons has won many awards for her contributions to technology and entrepreneurship, including the inaugural Veuve Clicquot New Generation Business Woman of the Year Award.
