= Presbyterian Church in Malaysia =

- Logo of the Presbyterian Church in Malaysia
- Classification: Protestant
- Orientation: Calvinist
- Polity: Presbyterian
- Moderator: Rev. Chua Hua Peng
- Associations: WARC, CWM, CCM, CFM, CCA, WCC
- Region: Malaysia
- Origin: 1974
- Branched from: Presbyterian Church in Singapore and Malaysia
- Congregations: 100
- Members: 7,000
- Primary schools: 2

The Presbyterian Church in Malaysia or GPM (Malay: Gereja Presbyterian Malaysia) is a Christian church in Malaysia. Established as an independent synod in 1974, it currently has approximately 7,000 members in 100 congregations nationwide.

The current Moderator of the GPM is the Rev. Chua Hua Peng.

== History ==
The Presbyterian Church in Malaysia today is the result of the convergence of two parallel historical developments that shares common roots but diverged early in work and emphasis - the English-speaking Synod of the English Presbytery and the Chinese-speaking Singapore Presbyterian Synod.

=== Early developments ===
The earliest contact with the Presbyterianism was through the Dutch control of the Portuguese Malacca in 1641. The staunchly Reformed Protestant Dutch banned the practice of Roman Catholicism in Malacca and converted all existing churches in Malacca for Dutch Reformed use. The main church used was the old St. Paul's Church (renamed as the Bovenkerk by the Dutch) built by the Portuguese in 1521 as the Nosa Senhora (Portuguese: Our Lady of the Hill) chapel on the summit of St. Paul's Hill.

Construction of a new church started in 1741 to replace the ageing Bovenkerk and was completed in 1753. This church reflects distinctive Dutch Presbyterian traditions within its interior architecture and continues to be used for Christian worship today.

When control of Malacca passed on to the British as a result of the Anglo-Dutch Treaty of 1824, the church was re-consecrated according to the rites of the Church of England by the Anglican Bishop of Calcutta in 1838 and renamed Christ Church.

=== Pioneering work ===
Many early missionaries from the London Missionary Society (LMS) such as William Milne who arrived in Malacca in 1815 were from Presbyterian or Reformed backgrounds and many LMS missionaries assisted in the providing spiritual nurture to the Scots community in Penang and Singapore along with chaplains of the East India Company who conducted worship for Church of England members.

One of the early missionaries was Benjamin Keasberry of the LMS who arrived in Singapore in 1839 while en route to China. Seeing the potential of Malay language work, he opted to stay in Singapore engaging the noted teacher, Munshi Abdullah, to assist him in improving his Malay linguistic skills. He started Malay language services in the LMS Chapel at Bras Basah and in 1843 acquired a piece of land in Kampong Bencoolen to build the Malay Mission Chapel. The chapel became popularly known as Gereja Keasberry or "Keasberry's Church" This eventually became the Prinsep Street Presbyterian Church when the English Presbyterian Mission bought over the property from the LMS.

With the departure of LMS missionaries to China after the Treaty of Nanking in 1847 with the notable exception of Keasberry, the local Scottish communities took steps to call their own ministers. This led to the arrival of Charles Moir in Penang in 1851 followed by Thomas McKenzie Fraser in Singapore in 1856. The Orchard Road Presbyterian Church in Singapore was established in 1856 to minister to the expatriates.

=== The Chinese mission ===
==== Ministering to the Chinese diaspora ====
Both Moir and Fraser attempted to extend work beyond the expatriate communities. Moir resigned in 1857 without much success although the congregation in Penang remains functioning, at times, for extended periods without a minister. Fraser successfully recruited an ethnic Chinese catechist from south Fujian, Tan See Boo, who was later ordained an elder in 1864. Unfortunately, Tan left in 1866 to join the Brethren.

In 1881, the Orchard Road congregation finally succeeded in obtaining a full-time missionary to the Chinese. The Rev. J.A.B. Cook, who was fluent in the Swatow and Southern Fujian dialects arrived in Singapore in November 1881. The English Presbyterian Mission under the supervision of the Cook organised the first Chinese congregation in Bukit Timah. It was the arrival of Cook that was eventually chosen to mark the founding of the present Presbyterian Churches of Malaysia and Singapore.

==== Mission expansion to Malaya ====
In 1886, Cook expanded the mission to the southern tip of Malaya in Johor Bahru to minister to the Teochew Chinese community. This work was supported by a prominent Johor businessman and the son-in-law of Keasberry, James Meldrum, who helped obtain a land grant for the church building from Sultan Abu Bakar of Johor who was a former student of Keasberry. Work was expanded to Muar in 1892 with the Rev. Liau Thian Ek as the first pastor.

Work in Penang continued abreast especially after the arrival of William Murray in 1892 who helped put Penang's congregation on a more solid footing. Pastoral responsibility of Penang's St. Andrew's Presbyterian Church eventually extended beyond Penang to Province Wellesley, Kedah, northern Perak, southern Thailand and North Sumatera.

==== Consolidation ====
In 1884, Cook wrote that a presbytery had been formed with him as the moderator and three Chinese elders. In January 1901, Cook convened a meeting of ministers and elders of the Chinese mission and the Singapore Presbyterian Synod was formed.

== 20th century ==
In 1948, the denomination became part of the Chinese Christian Church, later renamed the Chinese Christian Church Singapore and Malaysia Synod; in 1964, it was renamed the Church of Christ in China Malaysia Synod.

== Beliefs and practices ==
- Apostles Creed
- Westminster Confession

== Affiliations ==
- World Communion of Reformed Churches
- Council for World Mission

== See also ==
- Christianity in Malaysia
- Christianity in Singapore
- Presbyterian Church in Singapore
- Presbyterian Church in Singapore and Malaysia
