= Union of Evangelical Congregational Churches in Portugal =

The Union of Evangelical Congregational Churches in Portugal is a congregational church in Portugal, a member of the World Evangelical Congregational Fellowship.

Its headquarters is located in Lisbon. In 2004 it has 23 congregations, eight house fellowships and 300 members.
