= Congregational Christian Churches in Canada =

- Abbreviation: CCCC, 4Cs
- Orientation: Congregationalist
- Theology: Evangelical Protestant
- Polity: Congregational
- Region: Canada
- Headquarters: Simcoe, Ontario
- Congregations: 30
- Official website: https://www.cccc.ca/

The Congregational Christian Churches in Canada (or 4Cs) is an evangelical Protestant Christian denomination, headquartered in Simcoe, Ontario. It is a member of the World Evangelical Congregational Fellowship.

== Organization and leadership ==
The name "congregational" generally describes its preferred organizational style, which promotes local church autonomy and ownership, while fostering fellowship and accountability between churches at the national level.

The 4Cs is led by a National Board of Directors, representing different areas of the country and coordinated by the Chairman and the National Pastor who give spiritual oversight to the broader Church. The denomination meets annually at a National Conference, which confirms a new location (West, Maritimes or Central Canada) for the following year.

== Historical roots ==
The roots of Congregational Christianity can be traced back to the Protestant Reformation in England. Congregational Churches were established in the New World by non-Conformist Christians, some of these arriving (in what would become Canada) out of roots in New England. The revivals of the Great Awakening significantly contributed to the spread of congregational style and ministry all over the North American continent. Globally, Congregational ministry and missionaries spread to places like Hawaii and much of the south Pacific.

== Canadian hiatus ==
As a name and evangelical movement in Canada, Congregationalism was probably better known (and understood) in the 19th century, but many Congregational churches voted to join with Methodists and a majority of Presbyterians to form the United Church of Canada in 1925. As a direct consequence, the term "Congregational Church" fell into disuse, and virtually disappeared in Canada. A remnant of churches still congregational in polity were concentrated in Southern Ontario, and were known as the "Ontario Christian Churches". These churches affiliated with the Conservative Congregational Christian Conference in the United States in 1965, but retained their independence as a separate conference.

== Recent history and opposition to theological liberalism ==
In response to what they regarded as increasing theological liberalism within the United Church of Canada, particularly the denomination’s 1988 decision permitting the ordination of openly non-celibate gay ministers, some evangelical members left the church and sought affiliation with conservative congregations outside the denomination. A number of these individuals and congregations subsequently connected with the Congregational Christian Churches of Ontario, contributing to the later growth of the Congregational Christian Churches in Canada.

== Current situation ==
The 4Cs represent a family of about 30 evangelical churches across Canada, each one committed to living out the Biblical witness of Jesus Christ — His Great Commands and Great Commission — in the power of the Holy Spirit. The 4Cs is a member of the Evangelical Fellowship of Canada. Its congregations have a strong desire to present and represent Jesus to willing listeners, to pray for revival, to foster caring in both global and local mission projects, and to work hand-in-hand with committed Christians of other denominations.

The 4Cs are willing to incorporate community churches who may be looking for affiliation, and can provide both a national network and healthy accountability for member churches. Its congregations are varied in worship style, and in local focus, but all share a common commitment to Biblical faith and creed, and a commitment to fostering interdependence in fellowship with one another.

The 4Cs' vision statement is: "Proclaiming Jesus Christ. Making Disciples. Building Healthy Churches."

== See also ==
- List of Congregational churches
