= Congregational Federation of Australia and New Zealand =

Protestant denomination

- Classification: Protestant
- Theology: Reformed
- Polity: Congregational
- Moderator: Joe Goodall
- Origin: 1992
- Separated from: Fellowship of Congregational Churches
- Official website: http://cfanz.org.au/

The Congregational Federation of Australia and New Zealand is a Congregational denomination originally comprising fourteen congregations in New South Wales and Queensland but now including congregations in New Zealand.

== History ==
Forty congregations of the Congregational Union of Australia decided not to join the Uniting Church in Australia in 1977, and some formed the New South Wales based Fellowship of Congregational Churches. Other remained independent. Others formed the Queensland Congregational Fellowship.

In July 1995 the ecumenically minded congregations left the Fellowship of Congregational Churches because of its conservative and non-ecumenical orientation and with other churches who had remained outside the Uniting Church including the Queensland Congregational Fellowship formed the Congregational Federation of Australia, now the Congregational Federation of Australia and New Zealand. The Federation has also attracted Samoan, Western Samoan, Filipino and Tokelauan churches meeting in Australia and New Zealand.

== Affiliations ==
- National Council of Churches in Australia
- International Congregational Fellowship
- World Communion of Reformed Churches
