= Channing School =

Location
- The Bank; London, N6 5HF; England; 51.570220°N 0.144178°W

Information
- Type: Private day school
- Religious affiliation: Unitarian
- Established: 1885
- Local authority: Haringey
- Department for Education URN: 102162 Tables
- Headmistress: L Hughes
- Gender: Girls
- Age: 4 to 18
- Enrolment: ~670
- Website: channing.co.uk

Channing School is an independent day school for girls at Highgate Hill in Highgate, North London. Channing School is a member of the Girls' Schools Association. The junior school is for pupils aged four to twelve and includes the Early Years Foundation Stage (EYFS).

The Independent Schools Inspectorate (ISI), in April 2015, awarded Channing School the highest possible judgements in each category inspected, saying 'The quality of the pupils' achievements and learning is exceptional'.

The Good Schools Guide called the school "A sheltered, isolated school in a beautiful setting, less pressured than many London girls' schools but still getting excellent results and producing self-assured young women."

== History ==
Channing School, originally called Channing House, first opened in 1885 in Sutherland House under the Revd. Robert Spears and was endowed by the Misses Matilda and Emily Sharpe, the daughters of Samuel Sharpe, primarily for the daughters of Unitarian ministers, and named after William Ellery Channing. Robert Spears later became the first minister of Highgate Unitarian Church. There was assistance for six pupils by private benefactions. After a year, numbers had risen to about 90 pupils and by 1925 to about 125.

Ivy House, higher up the hill, was leased for dormitories and offices in 1885. In the same year the school also leased the semi-detached West View, immediately below Sutherland House and extended the frontage of both in 1887. In 1901 West View was bought, the other half of the semi-detached property, Slingley, was bought in 1921. This was done under the authority of Robert Mortimer Montgomery, who had been a Governor of the school since 1906, and became its chairman in December 1920. The neighbouring building, Hampden House was acquired in 1925 and in 1930 the adjacent Arundel House; these two forming another pair of semi-detached houses. Fairseat, leased with two acres of land, was used from 1926. A hall was opened in 1927 and from 1931 the school became known simply as Channing School.

Channing was badly damaged by a parachute mine during World War II. During the War, Montgomery oversaw the temporary relocation of the school and its pupils to the West Country, his last major effort before resigning from the chairmanship in 1944. Haigh House was built in 1954 to replace the damaged and bombed out buildings. In 1943 a Junior School opened at 12 Southwood Lane which was sold in 1955 when the junior school moved to Fairseat. There were 250 girls in 1950 and 390 in 1975.

== Buildings ==
The Junior School (also known as Fairseat) was the home of Sir Sydney Waterlow, 1st Baronet, who donated the park next door to the public after he died. There is a statue of him on the highest point in the park (just behind Fairseat's Tennis Courts) which shows him holding a key which is said to be the key to the park which he is offering to the public.

The Senior School has four buildings: Brunner House, Haigh House, Founders Hall and a complex completed in 2015 housing a Sixth Form Centre and a Sports Hall, with Fitness Suite. Founders Hall, once the Old Hall, was re-opened in February 2008 after renovations split the hall into two floors to extend the Sixth Form Centre. In 2014 Founders' Hall was renovated again to house a Music School with soundproofed practice rooms, a studio and teaching rooms. An upper floor was added to Brunner House in 2003, and constitutes staff offices and classrooms which double as the form rooms of year groups 7 to 9. Haigh House has the Science department, Art department, Mathematics department, ICT department, and dark room. The Mathematics department takes the place of the old dormitories, as the school was once a boarding school. A performing arts centre that seats 300 was completed in 2017.

== Notable alumni ==
- Susie Boyt, journalist and author
- Elsie Chamberlain, Congregational Church minister and radio broadcaster
- Caroline Cox, Baroness Cox, businesswoman and politician
- Jane Dacre, rheumatologist and previous president of the Royal College of Physicians of London
- Carly Fiorina, businesswoman and politician
- Hatty Jones, lead actress in Madeline (1998)
- Kathleen Lloyd Jones, garden designer
- Valerie Leon, actress and model
- Rona MacKie, dermatologist
- Catherine Neill, paediatric cardiologist
- Kathryn Parsons, tech entrepreneur
- Catherine Pickstock, philosophical theologian
- Fanny Rowe, actress
- Princess Sarvath El Hassan, Jordanian royal
- Margaret Stanley-Wrench, poet
- Victoria Starmer, wife of Prime Minister Keir Starmer and former solicitor
- Lucy Steeds, writer

Among notable staff, physicist Gladys Mackenzie taught at the school before her academic career.

== Pastoral care ==
Girls are placed in four houses:

- Sharpe- Named after Channing's co-founders, Emily and Matilda Sharpe.
- Spears- Named after the Rev. Robert Spears – co-founder of Channing
- Waterlow- Named after Sir Sydney Waterlow Bt, a philanthropist and politician, remembered for donating Waterlow Park in Highgate to the public as a “garden for the garden less”. His former house, Fairseat, is now the home of the Junior School.
- Goodwin- Named after a prominent Highgate family.

Girls participate in activities within these groups including Sports Competitions.
