= Fellowship of Congregational Churches =

Protestant denomination in Australia

- Region: Australia
- Origin: 1977
- Separations: Congregational Federation of Australia (1995)
- Congregations: 24 (2026)
- Official website: www.fccaus.org

The Fellowship of Congregational Churches is a conservative Congregational denomination in Australia. It was formed by the forty congregations of the Congregational Union of Australia who chose not to join the Uniting Church in Australia in 1977.

The Fellowship of Congregational Churches was declared to be the legal successor in New South Wales of the Congregational Union of Australia by Act of the New South Wales Parliament.

Some ecumenically minded congregations left the Fellowship of Congregational Churches in 1995 and formed the Congregational Federation of Australia.

The Rev. Fred Nile, a long-term member of the New South Wales Legislative Council, served as the President of the Fellowship of Congregational Churches for the years 2007 to 2012, and again for the 2013/2014 year.

In 2021, 28 Congregations were listed on their official website.
