= Congregational Union of New Zealand =

The Congregational Union of New Zealand (CUNZ) is an association of Congregationalist churches in New Zealand.

The first Congregationalist in New Zealand was Rev. Barzillai Quaife in 1840. Quaife was unable to establish a proper congregation and returned to England just 4 years later. In 1884 the Congregational Union was formed. Congregationalism slowly declined following this: in England Congregationalism was a middle-class religion, with New Zealand having a much smaller middle-class than England. Theologically Congregationalists were Calvinists, but the Presbyterian Church, also Calvinist, had a much stronger presence in New Zealand that it did in England. (Note: In fact in England most Presbyterians were Socinian or Unitarian)

In 1902 the Presbyterian church made overtures to the CUNZ and the Methodist churches regarding church union. Discussions on this were held occasionally over many years but no real action was taken. However, in 1943 the Raglan Congregational church merged with the Presbyterian church to form the first Union church in New Zealand. In 2019 this church severed all ties with the Presbyterian and Methodist churches and became a Congregational church again. A few months later the Assembly of the CUNZ severed all ties with the Uniting Churches of Aotearoa New Zealand (UCANZ), as the body is now called.

Immigration from the Pacific Islands led to a boost in the Congregationalist population but in 1969 the Pacific Islands Congregational Church merged with the Presbyterian Church of New Zealand, this was followed a year later by the rest of the The minority remained as the Congregational Union of New Zealand. In the 50 years since that split, the number of churches has increased although still small and fluctuating having currently 670 members and 13 congregations.

It is a member of the World Evangelical Congregational Fellowship, and the Evangelical Fellowship of Congregational Churches
