= Evangelical Fellowship of Congregational Churches =

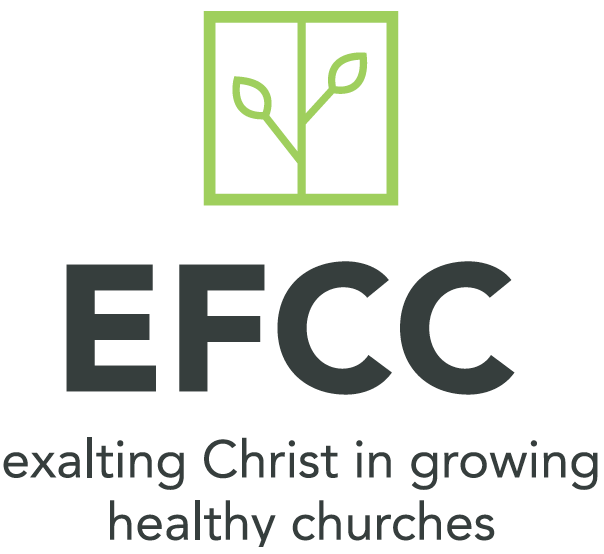
- Classification: Protestant
- Orientation: Evangelical, Reformed
- Polity: Congregationalist
- Ministry Director: Rev. Dr Tom Brand
- Associations: World Evangelical Congregational Fellowship (WECF)
- Region: United Kingdom
- Origin: 1967
- Congregations: 125
- Official website: www.efcc.org.uk

The Evangelical Fellowship of Congregational Churches (EFCC) is an association of around 100 independent local churches in the United Kingdom, each practising congregationalist church governance. The EFCC was founded in 1967 by those evangelical Congregationalists who did not want to lose their independence with the formation of the Congregational Church of England and Wales and the subsequent formation of the United Reformed Church in 1972. The EFCC is an Affinity partner.

The EFCC churches share a common doctrinal statement, called the Basis of Faith, which is Reformed and Evangelical. As the EFCC churches are congregational, the EFCC does not have any denominational hierarchy. However, the Fellowship does have officers, including a ministry director.

Currently, none of their congregations are in Scotland, although there are congregations in each of the other three nations within the United Kingdom.

Some of their churches are also in membership of the Congregational Federation or of the Fellowship of Independent Evangelical Churches (FIEC).

The EFCC is a member of the World Evangelical Congregational Fellowship (WECF). EFCC hosted the WECF's Triennial Conference in 2007 at Hothorpe Hall, Leicestershire and again in 2019 at Hebron Hall in South Wales.
