= Life Church, Richmond =

Coordinates: 51°27′27″N 0°18′13″W

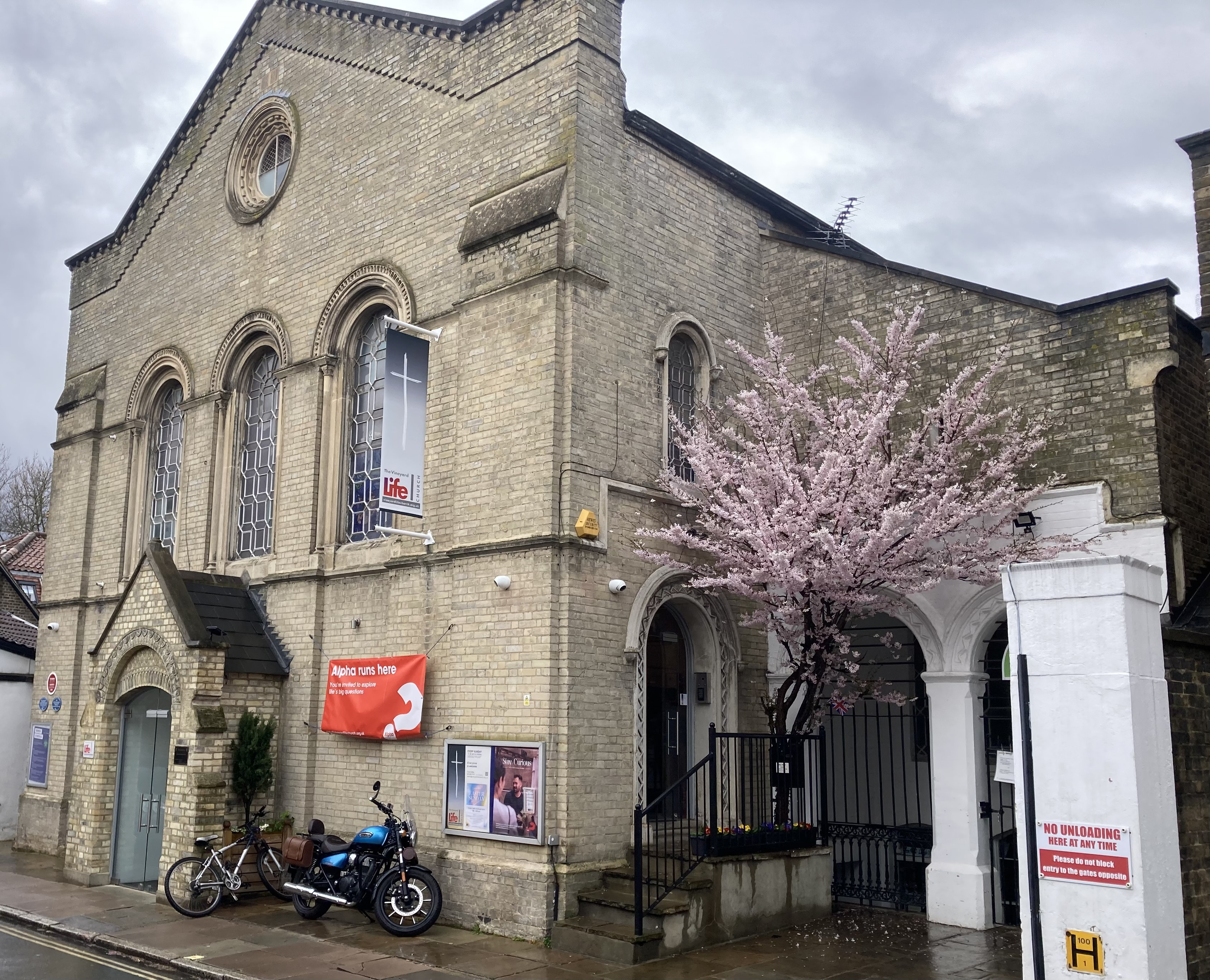
- Life Church, Richmond
- Location: The Vineyard, Richmond TW10 6AQ
- Country: England
- Denomination: Evangelical/Charismatic
- Website: www.lifechurchrichmond.uk

Architecture
- Architect: John Davies
- Style: Norman

Specifications
- Materials: grey brick

Life Church, Richmond, a member of the Evangelical Alliance, the New Ground Churches and the Congregational Federation, was formed in 2013 as the result of a merger between Richmond Borough Church and The Vineyard Church, Richmond. It meets in a 19th-century church building located in the London Borough of Richmond upon Thames. The Vineyard Community Centre, which is an associate charity to the church, run a community centre, a food bank (with smaller satellites across the borough) and a charity shop in the basement.

The land for the church was bought by Thomas Wilson, a Christian businessman and a philanthropist. He was the Treasurer of the London Missionary Society for many years, a member of the Religious Tract Society and he also helped found the British and Foreign Bible Society. He was also one of the originators of London University (now University College) and was elected to its first Council in 1825. But he became best known for his extensive work across the country in building new chapels for dissenters as well as restoring dilapidated ones that he came across in his travels.

Thomas Wilson also paid for the construction of the Vineyard Chapel as it was then called, and it opened in 1831, to seat a congregation of 500 to 600. It was rebuilt in 1851 after The Great Fire of Richmond. The church is built in Norman style, in grey brick, with a distinctive porch.The Vineyard Chapel had a gallery, and was designed by John Davies (1796–1865); Davies had a number of commissions for Congregational Chapels and was the architect for Highbury College for Dissenters in Islington.

The Richmond Society made an award to the church in 2021 for a distinguished contribution to Richmond for the ‘repair, refurbishment and upgrade of the church premises to improve accessibility and to provide facilities for the various activities undertaken at the church in a manner sympathetic to the historic building’.

The first members of the church numbered nine. They were Mrs Day, Mrs Fuller, Mr Fuller, Mrs Foulke, Mr Gandee, Mrs Gandee, Mrs Ford, Mr Pranklin, and Mrs Frances. At their first meeting held on 21 December 1831, they declared that theirs was ‘a missionary effort by carrying the preaching of the Gospel into the midst of a forgetful and slumbering people'.

Reaching the people of Richmond with the gospel of Jesus continues to be the heart of the congregation in the twenty first century.

It is well known that the painter Vincent van Gogh preached at the Methodist Church in Richmond, and the Methodist chapel in Ham in autumn 1876. This was when he was living in Isleworth and teaching at a boarding school run by a Congregationalist minister, Revd. Thomas Slade-Jones. He was the minister of a Congregational Church in Turnham Green and mentored Van Gogh in his wish to carry out missionary work. Besides Van Gogh’s involvement in Richmond, Ham and Turnham Green, it is possible that the ‘preacher with the red hair,’ also preached at the Vineyard Chapel.

Other prominent people associated with the church in the next century were Harold Wilson, with his wife Mary, who attended during the Second World War, before he served as British Prime Minister; another, was Lady Stansgate, who was a member of the church during the 1940s^{[2]}and mother of the late Labour MP Tony Benn.

Between 1971 and 1972, the future British Prime Minister Tony Blair and his friend Al Collenette held weekly discos in the church basement, where the Vineyard Community Centre now operates.

The archive records of the church, dating back to 1830, can be viewed at Richmond Local Studies Library and Archive.
