= Presbyterian Church in Singapore and Malaysia =

- Classification: Protestant
- Orientation: Presbyterian
- Origin: 1881
- Separations: Bible-Presbyterian Church (Singapore) (1950); Presbyterian Church in Malaysia (1974); Presbyterian Church in Singapore (1975)
- Defunct: 1975

Presbyterian Church in Singapore and Malaysia was a Christian denomination in Malaysia and Singapore.

It was founded in 1881 and had its first synod in 1901. It was known as the Singapore and Malaysia Synod of the Church of Christ in China until 1968, when it changed its name to the Presbyterian Church in Singapore and Malaysia. It held its final synod in 1974, and in 1975 the Presbyterian Church in Singapore and the Presbyterian Church in Malaysia were formed.
