= Congregational Federation =

Christian denomination in Great Britain

- Logo of the Congregational Federation
- Classification: Protestant
- Orientation: Congregationalism
- Polity: Congregational polity
- Associations: International Congregational Fellowship
- Region: Great Britain
- Origin: Formed in 1972 from congregations which did not join the United Reformed Church
- Separated from: Congregational Church in England and Wales
- Congregations: 235 (2024)
- Publications: The Congregationalist
- Official website: www.congregational.org.uk

The Congregational Federation is a small Christian denomination in Great Britain comprising 235 congregations, down from 294 in April 2014. The Federation brings together Congregational churches, and provides support and guidance to member churches both financially and otherwise.

== History ==
The Federation was formed in 1972 from those Congregational churches which did not enter the union of the Presbyterian Church of England with the Congregational Church in England and Wales to form the United Reformed Church. The leaders at the time were Reginald Cleaves, Margaret, Viscountess Stansgate, John Wilcox and Elsie Chamberlain. Margaret, Viscountess Stansgate became the Federation's first President.

The Federation was expanded in 2000 by member churches of the Congregational Union of Scotland that chose not to join their merger with the United Reformed Church.

It is a member of the International Congregational Fellowship, an international network of Congregational churches and their national associations. Some of its churches are also in membership of the Evangelical Fellowship of Congregational Churches.

The offices of the Congregational Federation are in Nottingham, England.

== Ecumenical relations ==
The Congregational Federation is a member of:

- Action of Churches Together in Scotland
- Churches Together in Britain and Ireland
- Churches Together in England
- Cytûn

== Churches ==
The churches are organised into 10 geographical regions. CC stands for Congregational Church/Chapel.

=== Eastern ===
Church	Location	Founded
Battlesbridge Free Church	Battlesbridge, Essex	1836
Braintree CC	Braintree, Essex	1699
Cowper Memorial CC, Dereham	Dereham, Norfolk	1873
East Bergholt CC	East Bergholt, Suffolk	1672
Guilden Morden CC	Guilden Morden, Cambridgeshire	1841
West End CC, Haverhill	Haverhill, Suffolk	1836
Hutton Free Church	Hutton, Essex	1850
Hatfield Road CC, Ipswich	Ipswich, Suffolk	1957
Worship Jesus Ministries, Ipswich	Ipswich, Suffolk	
Litlington CC	Litlington, Cambridgeshire	1815
Long Stratton CC	Long Stratton, Norfolk	1821
Nordelph CC	Nordelph, Norfolk	
North Walsham CC	North Walsham, Norfolk	1657
Old Meeting House, Norwich	Norwich, Norfolk	1643
Orsett Community Church	Orsett, Essex	1842
Ridgewell CC	Ridgewell, Essex	1662
Silver End CC	Silver End, Essex	1929
Stambourne CC	Stambourne, Essex	1662
Steeple Bumpstead CC	Steeple Bumpstead, Essex	1760
Thundersley CC (The Beacon)	Thundersley, Essex	1908
Tollesbury CC	Tollesbury, Essex	
Wivenhoe CC	Wivenhoe, Essex	1672
Woodham Ferrers Chapel	Woodham Ferrers, Essex	1835
