= United Reformed Church =

Christian church organisation in the United Kingdom

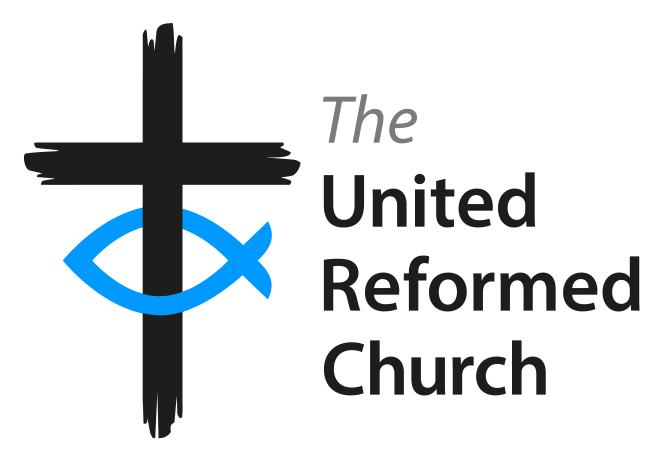
- Classification: Protestant
- Orientation: Reformed
- Scripture: Protestant Bible
- Polity: Presbyterian; Congregationalist
- Moderator: The Revd Timothy Meadows (since 2024)
- Associations: World Council of Churches, World Communion of Reformed Churches, Council for World Mission, Conference of European Churches, Community of Protestant Churches in Europe, Churches Together in Britain and Ireland, Churches Together in England, Action of Churches Together in Scotland, Cytûn, Christian Aid, World Development Movement
- Region: Great Britain
- Origin: 1972; 54 years ago
- Merger of: Presbyterian Church of England, Congregational Church in England and Wales, Re-formed Association of Churches of Christ
- Absorbed: Congregational Union of Scotland (2000)
- Congregations: 1,284
- Members: 36,986
- Ministers: 241
- Official website: https://urc.org.uk/

The United Reformed Church (URC) is a Protestant Christian church in the United Kingdom. As of 2024 it had approximately 44,000 members in around 1,250 congregations with 334 stipendiary ministers.

The URC is a Trinitarian church whose theological roots are distinctly Reformed and whose historical and organisational roots are in the Presbyterian traditions and Congregational traditions. Its Basis of Union contains a statement concerning the nature, faith and order of the United Reformed Church, which sets out its beliefs in a condensed form.

== Origins and history ==
The United Reformed Church resulted from the 1972 union of the Presbyterian Church of England and the Congregational Church in England and Wales. In introducing the United Reformed Church Bill in the House of Commons on 21 June 1972, Alexander Lyon called it "one of the most historic measures in the history of the Christian churches in this country". About a quarter of English Congregational churches chose not to join the new denomination; in England, there are three main groups of continuing Congregationalists: the Congregational Federation, the Evangelical Fellowship of Congregational Churches and the Fellowship of Independent Evangelical Churches.

The URC subsequently united with the Re-formed Association of Churches of Christ in 1981 and the Congregational Union of Scotland in 2000.

In 2006, the URC had 78,872 members in 1,655 congregations. In 2026, the denomination had nearly halved its membership since that date to 39,576 members, in 1149 congregations.

In the July 2026 General assembly, it was reported that the denomination had 241 deployable stipendiary ministers serving approximately 1,200 churches. The Sustainability of Stipendiary Ministry in the United Reformed Church report by the Ministries Committee estimated that current patterns point to a significant decline in deployable ministers over the next decade: with around 200 ministers by 2028, below 150 by 2032, and approximately 128 by 2035.

It currently has three training centres, The Scottish College, in Hope Street, in Glasgow; Northern College, Manchester and Westminster College, Cambridge.

== Beliefs ==
=== Marriage ===
In 2007, a detailed report was submitted to the General Assembly exploring the church's position on same-sex relationships.

In 2012, the URC voted to allow the blessing of same-sex civil partnerships.

On 9 July 2016 the church formally voted by 240 votes to 21 in favour of allowing any local church to offer blessings of same-sex marriage, if it chooses to obtain a licence.

=== Ecumenism ===
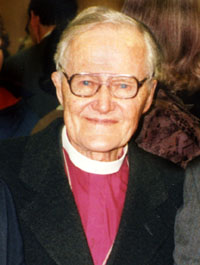
Lesslie Newbigin was Moderator of the General Assembly of the URC in 1978/1979.

Formed in an act of ecumenical union, the URC is committed to ecumenism. The denomination is a member of many ecumenical organisations, including Churches Together in England, Cytûn (Churches Together in Wales), the Enfys covenant, Action of Churches Together in Scotland (ACTS) and Churches Together in Britain and Ireland, the World Council of Churches, the Conference of European Churches, the Community of Protestant Churches in Europe, the World Communion of Reformed Churches and the Council for World Mission.

In 1982, the URC voted in favour of a covenant with the Church of England, the Methodist Church and the Moravian Church, which would have meant remodelling its moderators as bishops and incorporating its ministry into the apostolic succession. However, the Church of England rejected the covenant.

== Archives ==
The denominational archives of the United Reformed Church are held in the Congregational Library, housed at the Dr Williams's Library, in London, as are the archives of the Congregational Union of England and Wales. The papers of the Presbyterian Church of England are held at Westminster College, Cambridge. The papers of associated missionary societies (London Missionary Society, the Council for World Mission (Congregational), and the Foreign Missions Committee (Presbyterian)) are held by the Archives of the School of Oriental and African Studies, London.

Local church records are the responsibility of the church concerned, and will normally be found either in the relevant local record office, or at the church concerned.

== Polity and ministries ==
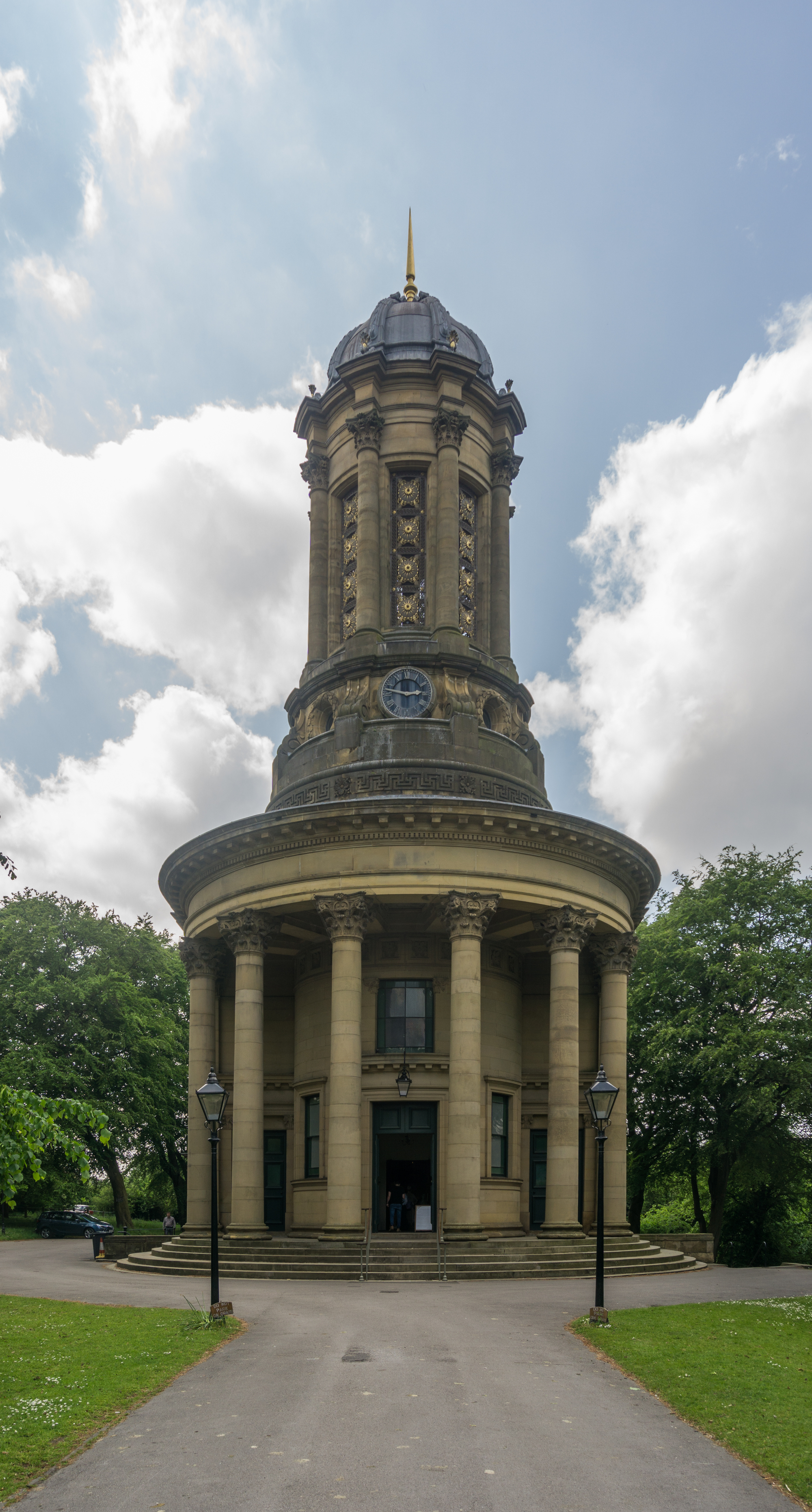
Grade I listed Saltaire United Reformed Church in West Yorkshire

The URC is governed by a combined form of congregationalism and presbyterian polity.

=== Congregation ===
According to its 2022 Yearbook, the United Reformed Church has approximately 40,000 members in 1,284 congregations with 334 stipendiary ministers, 56 non-stipendiary ministers, 110 non-active or in non-URC posts, 844 retired ministers, 209 of whom are active, 30 church-related community workers, 218 ministers of other churches, 36 Synod recognised local lay leaders and lay pastors, 2 mission partners, 342 accredited lay preachers, 7,286 serving elders and 6,278 non serving elders. The decline of the denomination matches that of other Christian churches in the United Kingdom such as the Church of England and the Methodist Church.

Each congregation (local church) within the URC is governed by a Church Meeting consisting of all its members, which is the ultimate decision-making body in the local church. There is also an elders' meeting (similar to the presbyterian Kirk Session in the Church of Scotland) which advises the Church Meeting and shares with the minister the spiritual and pastoral oversight of the church. Elders are normally elected to serve for a specific period of time.

Within the present structures, congregations are able to manage themselves and arrange their services as they choose, reflecting their circumstances and preferences. As a result, congregations, even neighbouring ones, may have quite different characters, types of service and eligibility for communion.

Congregations, through the Church Meeting, are responsible for the selection (issue of a 'call') of ministers to fill vacancies. They also select elders from within the membership and accept new members.

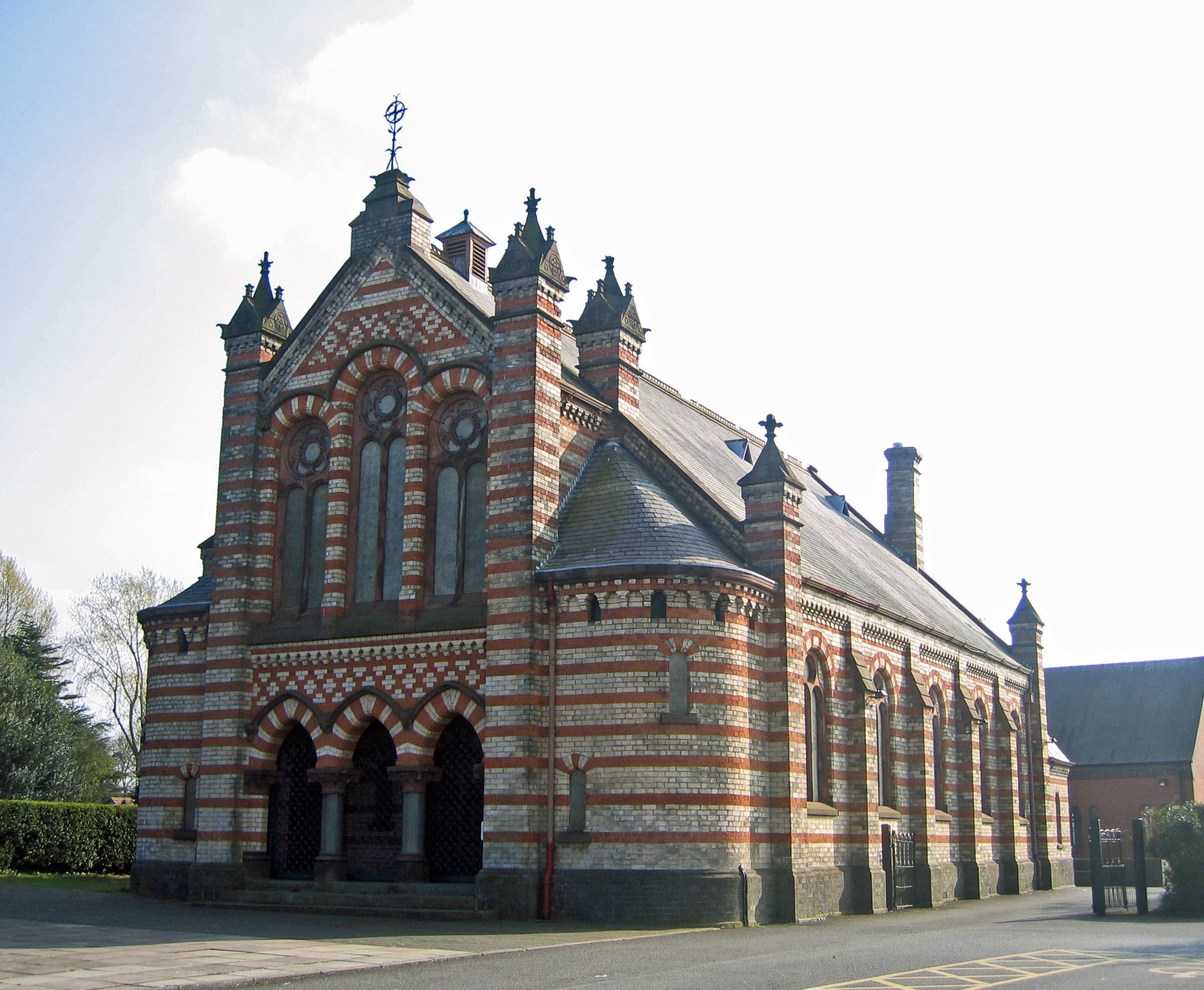
Over United Reformed Church, Winsford, Cheshire

=== Synod ===
At a regional level, representatives of the congregations assemble in a synod. There are 11 English synods, roughly corresponding to each region of England, one in Scotland and one in Wales; each is served by a synod moderator. The synod and its committees provide oversight within the framework of presbyterian polity, giving pastoral care and making important decisions about where ministers serve and how churches share ministry. Through the synods, the URC relates to other Christian denominations at a regional level such as Anglican dioceses. Synods make many key decisions about finance, and about church property, which is usually held in trust by a synod trust company. Synods have committees and employ staff to encourage and serve local churches.

=== General Assembly ===
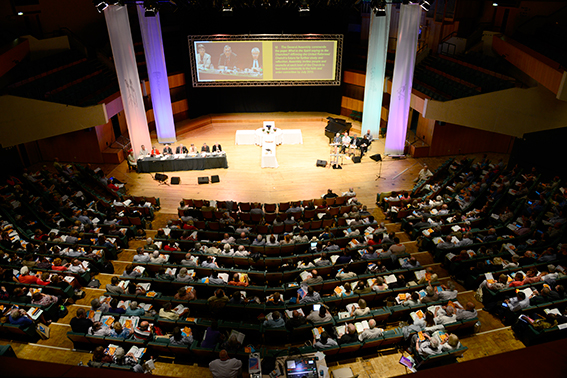
The General Assembly of the United Reformed Church meeting in Cardiff, Wales, July 2014

The URC has a General Assembly (chaired by a Moderator, who can either be an Elder or an ordained Minister of Word and Sacrament or a Church Related Community Worker (CRCW) which gathers representatives of the whole of the URC to meet annually.

Advised by the Assembly Executive, formerly known as the Mission Council, the General Assembly plans the activity of the URC across Great Britain and makes key policy decisions about the direction of the life of the denomination.

It also appoints central staff (i.e. those responsible Britain-wide), receives reports from committees, and deals with substantial reports and mission initiatives. The synods are represented along with the convenors of the Assembly's standing committees.

There are 11 standing committees appointed by General Assembly to carry out its policy and to advise the Assembly. Each committee relates to a different area of church life, including communications, mission, ministries and education and learning.

Assembly Executive, formerly known as the Mission Council, the executive body of the General Assembly, meets once a year every February (until 2022 this meeting took place every November).

=== Church Related Community Work (CRCW) ===
Church Related Community Work (CRCW) is a distinctive ministry within the URC. CRCW ministers use the principles of community development to respond to issues facing their neighbourhoods, working alongside local individuals and organisations, developing initiatives to transform communities.

Between them, CRCW ministers enable churches to widen their mission by:

- identifying local needs and opportunities;
- confronting injustice;
- organising community action;
- developing and supporting initiatives that improve the lives and wellbeing of local people; and
- theologically reflecting upon that action.

=== United Reformed Church Youth ===
URC Youth is for young people aged 11–25. Formed in 1974, with the name the Fellowship of United Reformed Youth (FURY), it is led by URC Youth Executive who plan the annual Youth Assembly. The Youth Executive comprises a representative from each Synod, and several other members such as the Moderator and Moderator-Elect.

== Reformed magazine ==
The United Reformed Church has published Reform magazine since 1972, as a forum for "News, comment, inspiration debate". A digital edition of the magazine, accessed through an app or online, was launched in April 2015. Reform was called "a prophetic voice" by the theologian Robert Beckford in 2013.

== See also ==
- English Presbyterianism
- English Presbyterian Mission
- Religion in the United Kingdom
- United Reformed Church Guide and Scout Fellowship
- United and uniting churches
