= Protestantism in Indonesia =

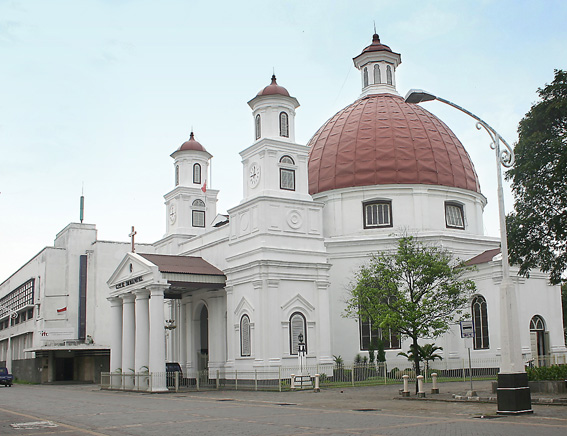
Blenduk Church in Semarang, built in European architecture

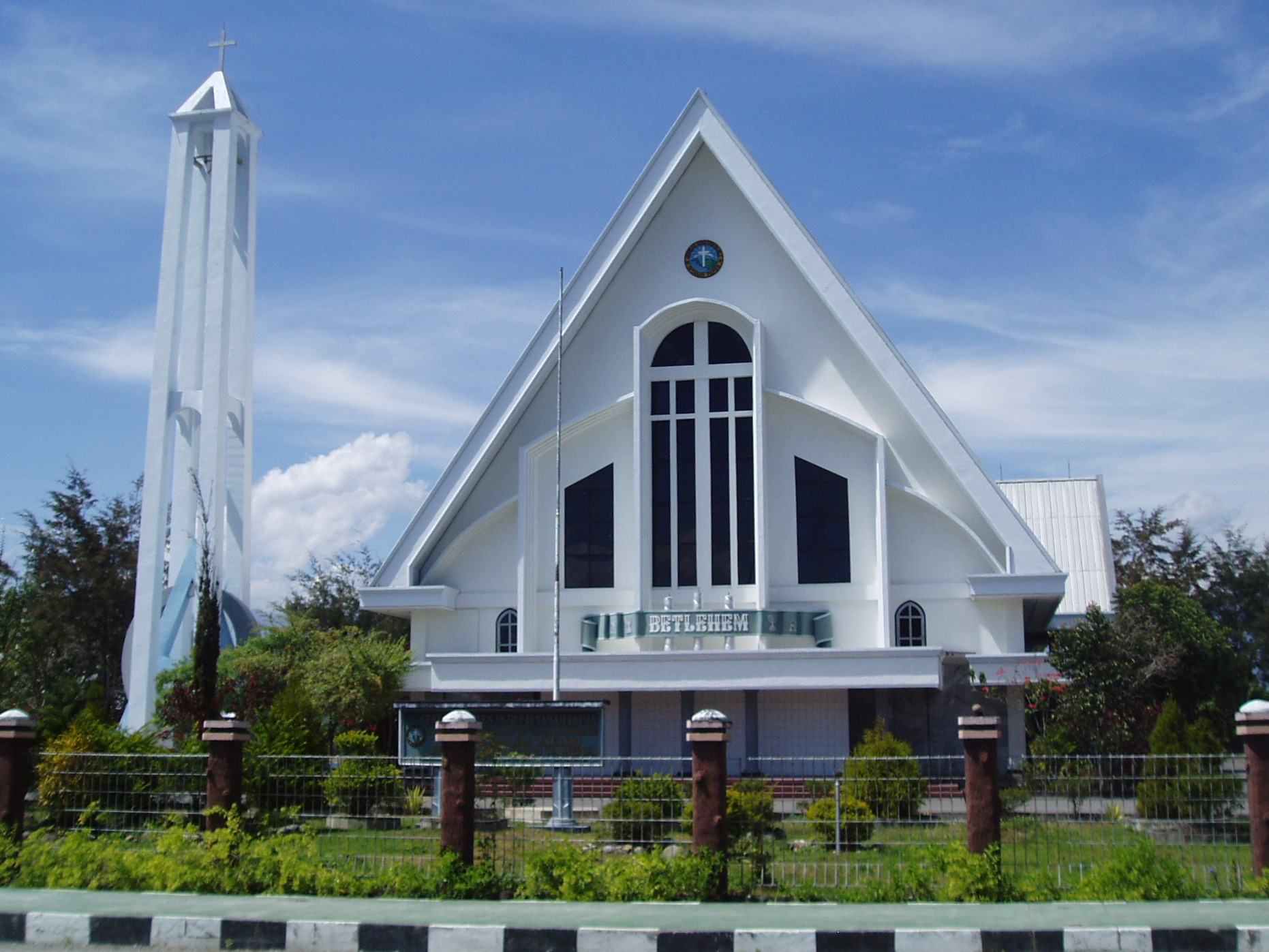
Betlehem Church in Wamena, Highland Papua

Protestants in each regency of Indonesia

Protestantism (Indonesian: Protestanisme) is one of the six recognised religions in Indonesia, the others being Islam, Roman Catholicism, Hinduism, Buddhism, and Confucianism. Its followers comprise the majority of Christians in Indonesia, who are the second largest religious group in the country after Muslims.

According to CIA statistics, in 2000 5.7% of the population of Indonesia were Protestant. A nationwide census of 2018 noted that 7.6% (20,250,000) of the population considered themselves Protestant, the largest such community in Southeast Asia.

Protestantism in Indonesia is largely a result of Reformed and Lutheran missionary efforts during the country's colonial period. The Dutch East India Company regulated the missionary work so it could serve its own interests and restricted it to the eastern part of the Indonesian archipelago. Although these two branches are the most common, a multitude of other denominations can be found elsewhere in Indonesia. The largest is the Batak Protestant Christian Church, founded by German Lutheran missionary Ludwig Ingwer Nommensen in 1861.

== History ==
Protestantism arrived in Indonesia during the Dutch East Indies colonisation. By the mid-1700s a significant Lutheran presence was found in Jakarta, with a Lutheran church built by the Lutheran Governor General Gustaaf Willem van Imhoff in 1749. In 1817, the Dutch founded the Protestantsche Kerk in Nederlandsch-Indie (colloquially, Indische Kerk) as a union of Reformed, Lutheran, Baptists, Arminian and Mennonite denominations. In 1835, William I of the Netherlands decreed one church council would fuse and oversee Protestant denominations in the Dutch colony.

== Demographics ==
In 2018, Protestants made up 7.43% of the population.

On the island of Sulawesi, 17% of the citizens are Protestant, particularly in Tana Toraja and North Sulawesi. Up to 65% of the Torajan population is Protestant. In some parts of the country, entire villages belong to a distinct denomination, such as Adventist, Lutheran, Presbyterian or Salvation Army. Two provinces have Protestant majorities: North Sulawesi (64%) and Papua (60%). Christian Evangelical Church in Minahasa is the largest Protestant church in North Sulawesi. Gereja Injili di Tanah Jawa is a Mennonite-related denomination. Huria Kristen Batak Protestant is a Lutheran denomination founded by Ludwig Ingwer Nommensen. It is the largest Protestant denomination in Indonesia and has over 4 million congregants. The relatively large number of "denominations" per capita in Indonesia may be due to the significant number of different ethnic groups in Indonesia. Many Indonesian Protestants tend to congregate based more on ethnicity than liturgical differences.

== Reformed denominations ==
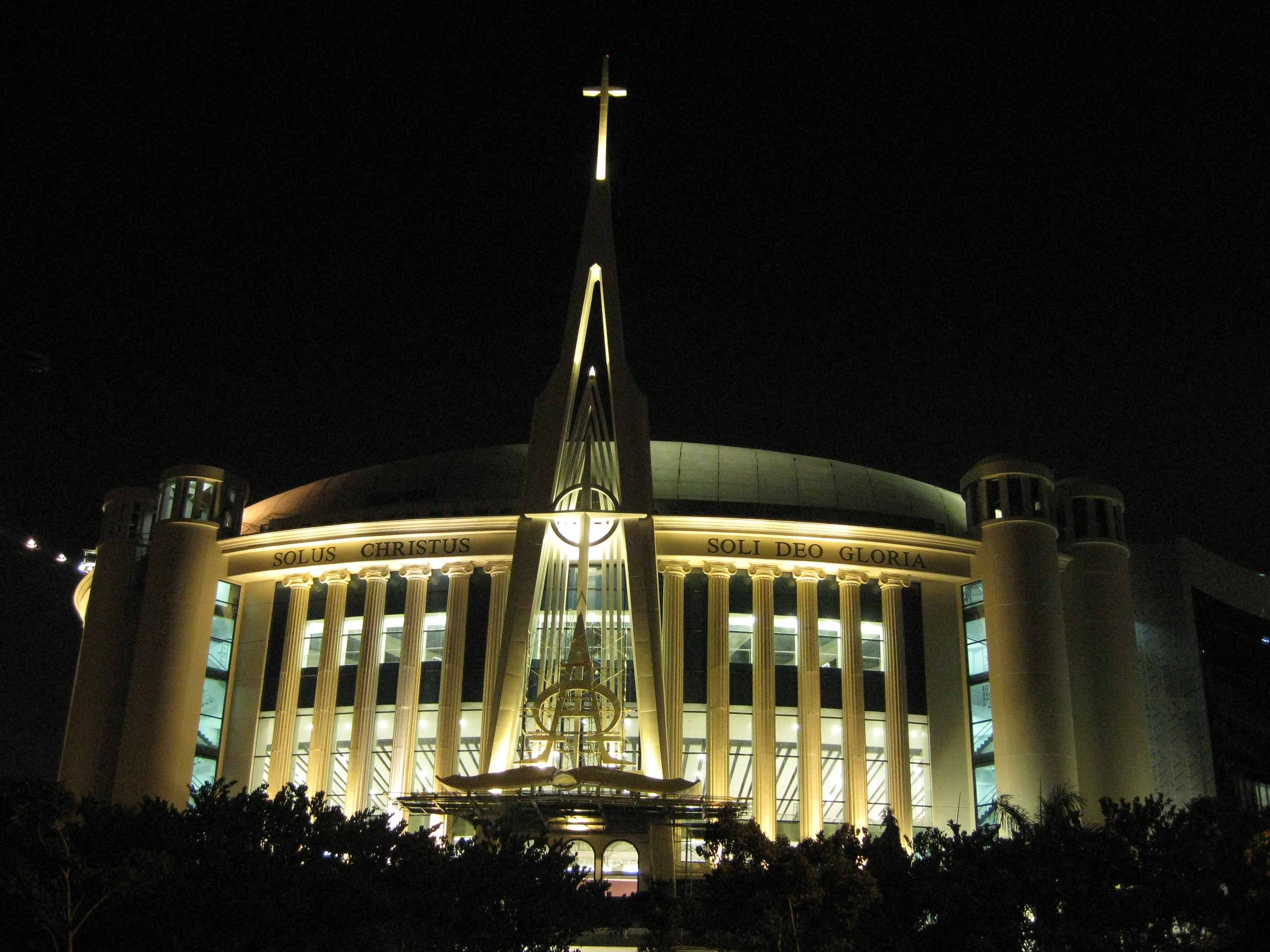
Messiah Cathedral megachurch, captured from Kemayoran Street, Jakarta

The Reformed faith was brought by Dutch missionaries beginning in the 17th century. Many of these churches are members of the World Communion of Reformed Churches:

- Christian Evangelical Church in Sangihe-Talaud (GMIST)
- Christian Evangelical Church in Minahasa (GMIM)
- Christian Church in East Timor
- Christian Church in Luwuk Banggai
- Christian Church in Central Sulawesi
- Christian Church of Southern Sumatra
- Christian Church of Sumba
- Church of Toraja Mamasa
- East Java Christian Church
- Evangelical Christian Church in Halmahera
- Evangelical Christian Church in Papua
- Evangelical Church in Bolaang Mongondow
- Evangelical Church in Kalimantan
- Indonesian Christian Church
- Indonesian Protestant Church in Buol Toli-Toli
- Indonesian Protestant Church in Donggala
- Indonesian Protestant Church in Gorontalo
- Javanese Christian Church (Sinode Gereja-gereja Kristen Jawa, GKJ)
- Karo Batak Protestant Church
- Pasundan Christian Church
- Protestant Christian Church in Bali
- Protestant Church in Indonesia
- Protestant Church of Maluku
- Protestant Church in Southeast Sulawesi
- Protestant Church in West Indonesia
- Protestant Evangelical Church in Timor
- Toraja Church

=== Members of the International Conference of Reformed Churches ===
- Gereja-Gereja Reformasi Calvinis
- Gereja-Gereja Reformasi di Indonesia

=== Members of World Reformed Fellowship ===
- Reformed Evangelical Church in Indonesia

== Lutheran denominations ==
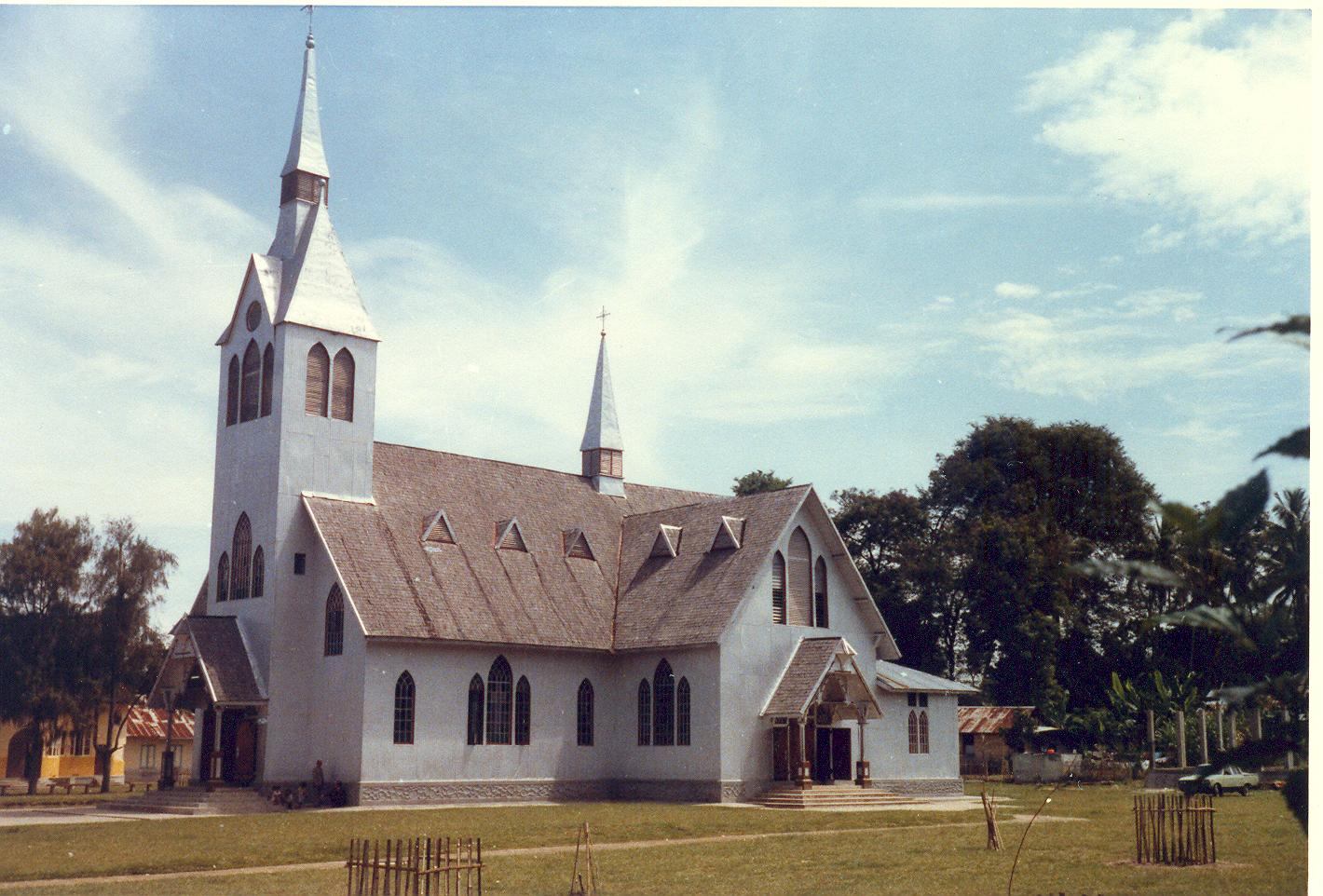
A Batak Christian Protestant Church in Balige, North Sumatra, built circa 1917.

Indonesian churches recognised by the Lutheran World Federation as Lutheran or affiliated with Lutheran are:

- Banua Niha Keriso Protestan (BNKP) – The Protestant Church in Nias Island
- Gereja Angowuloa Masehi Indonesia Nias (AMIN) – Christian Communion of Indonesia in Nias
- Gereja Kristen Luther Indonesia (GKLI) – Indonesian Christian Lutheran Church
- Gereja Kristen Protestan Angkola (GKPA) – Christian Protestant Angkola Church
- Gereja Kristen Protestan di Mentawai (GKPM) – Protestant Christian Church in Mentawai
- Gereja Kristen Protestan Indonesia (GKPI) – Christian Protestant Church in Indonesia
- Gereja Kristen Protestan Pakpak Dairi (GKPPD) – Pakpak Dairi Protestant Christian Church
- Gereja Kristen Protestan Simalungun (GKPS) – Simalungun Protestant Christian Church
- Gereja Punguan Kristen Batak (GPKB) – Batak Christian Community Church
- Gereja Protestan Persekutuan (GPP) – The United Protestant Church
- Huria Kristen Batak Protestan (HKBP) – Protestant Christian Batak Church
- Huria Kristen Indonesia (HKI) – The Indonesian Christian Church
- Orahua Niha Keriso Protestan (ONKP) - Communion of Protestant Christian Church

HKI, GMB, GKPS, GKPI, GKLI, GKPA, GPP, and GKPPD all split from HKBP. GKLI maintains a strong relationship with the Norwegian Lutheran Church. GKPM was founded by HKBP missionaries. Although the BNKP and HKBP have historically cooperated, no official relationship exists between those entities. AMIN split from BNKP and retains more of a Lutheran identity.

Gereja Lutheran Indonesia (GLI) is affiliated with the Confessional Evangelical Lutheran Conference. GLI is closely associated with the Wisconsin Evangelical Lutheran Synod in the United States. GLI has offices in Jakarta and operates a seminary, Sekolah Tinggi Teologi Lutheran (STTL), in Yogyakarta. GLI has large congregations on Java and in West Timor, as well as posts in Papua and Kalimantan.

== See also ==
- Christianity in Indonesia
- Religion in Indonesia
- Christianity among the Batak
- Pentecostal Church in Indonesia
- Protestantism by country
- Buku Ende
