= World Alliance of Reformed Churches =

International Christian fellowship

The World Alliance of Reformed Churches (WARC) was a fellowship of more than 200 churches with roots in the 16th century Reformation, and particularly in the theology of John Calvin. Its headquarters was in Geneva, Switzerland. They merged with the Reformed Ecumenical Council in 2010 to form the World Communion of Reformed Churches.

== History ==
The World Alliance of Reformed Churches (WARC) was created in 1970 by a merger of two bodies, the Alliance of the Reformed Churches holding the Presbyterian System, representing Presbyterian and Reformed churches, and the International Congregational Council. The Alliance of the Reformed Churches holding the Presbyterian System was formed in London in 1875. It held councils which had no legislative authority but great moral weight. In them the various Augustinian non-prelatical and in general presbyterial bodies found representation. They were upward of 90 in number, scattered all over the world, with 25,000,000 adherents. The published reports of the proceedings of these councils contain much valuable matter of all kinds, as papers are read, statistics presented, and many speeches made. Councils were held at London, 1875; Edinburgh, 1877; Philadelphia, 1880; Belfast, 1884; London, 1888; Toronto, 1892; Glasgow, 1896; Washington, 1899.

The World Alliance of Reformed Churches had 218 member churches in 107 countries around the world, with some 75 million members. Churches represented in the WARC included Congregational, Presbyterian, Reformed and United churches which have historical roots in the 16th century Reformation.

The WARC Secretariat was located in the Ecumenical Centre in Geneva, Switzerland. It worked closely with the World Council of Churches.

In 2000, the WAR was critical of Dominus Iesus, the Congregation for the Doctrine of the Faith's document, and considered calling off a formal dialogue in Rome that year.

On 1 February 2006, Clifton Kirkpatrick, president of the WARC, and Douwe Visser, president of the Reformed Ecumenical Council (REC), said in a joint letter, "We rejoice in the work of the Holy Spirit which we believe has led us to recommend that the time has come to bring together the work of the World Alliance of Reformed Churches and the Reformed Ecumenical Council into one body that will strengthen the unity and witness of Reformed Christians." The resulting new organisation is the World Communion of Reformed Churches.

== Assemblies ==
Number	Year	Place	Notes
20	1970	Nairobi, Kenya	Uniting General Council
–	1977	St Andrews, Scotland	Centennial Consultation
21	1982	Ottawa, Canada	
22	1989	Seoul, South Korea	
23	1997	Debrecen, Hungary	
24	2004	Accra, Ghana	

== Presidents ==
WARC presidents are elected for seven years at every General Council (held septennially):

Year	Name	Country
1977–1982	James McCord	
1983–1990	Allan A. Boesak	South Africa
1990–1997	Jane Dempsey Douglass	US
1997–2004	Choan-Seng Song	Taiwan
2004–2010	Clifton Kirkpatrick	US

== General Secretaries ==
From 1970 to 1989 the General Secretary was Rev. Edmond Perret from Switzerland. In 1988 the Executive Committee meeting in Belfast, Northern Ireland elected Rev. Dr. Milan Opočenský (Czech Rep.) who held office until 2000. In 2000 Rev. Dr. Setri Nyomi (Ghana) became the General Secretary of WARC, and later WCRC.

== Members (2006) ==
The WARC brought together more than 75 million Christians in over 100 countries around the world.

Member churches were Congregational, Presbyterian, Reformed and united and uniting churches.

Most of these are in the southern hemisphere with many being religious minorities in their countries.

- Algeria
  - Protestant Church of Algeria
- American Samoa
  - Congregational Christian Church in American Samoa
- Angola, Republic of
  - Evangelical Reformed Church of Angola
- Argentina
  - Evangelical Church of the River Plate
  - Reformed Churches in Argentina
  - Evangelical Congregational Church
  - Swiss Evangelical Church
- Australia
  - Uniting Church in Australia
  - Congregational Federation of Australia
- Austria
  - Reformed Church in Austria
- Belgium
  - United Protestant Church in Belgium
- Bermuda
  - Church of Scotland
- Bolivia
  - Evangelical Presbyterian Church in Bolivia
- Botswana
  - Dutch Reformed Church in Botswana
- Brazil
  - Presbyterian Church of Brazil
  - Independent Presbyterian Church of Brazil
  - United Presbyterian Church of Brazil
  - Christian Reformed Church of Brazil
  - Evangelical Reformed Churches in Brazil
  - Arab Evangelical Church of Sao Paulo
- Bulgaria
  - Union of Evangelical Congregational Churches in Bulgaria
- Burkina Faso
  - Reformed Evangelical Church of Burkina Faso
- Burma
  - Mara Evangelical Church
  - Independent Presbyterian Church of Myanmar
  - The Presbyterian Church of Myanmar
- Cameroon
  - Presbyterian Church in Cameroon
  - Presbyterian Church of Cameroon
  - African Protestant Church
- Canada
  - The Presbyterian Church in Canada / L'Église presbytérienne au Canada
  - United Church of Canada
- Central African Republic
  - Protestant Church of Christ the King
- Chile
  - Presbyterian Church of Chile
  - National Presbyterian Church
  - Presbyterian Evangelical Church in Chile
- Colombia
  - Presbyterian Synod
- Congo, Democratic Republic
  - Presbyterian Community in the Congo
  - Presbyterian Community of Eastern Kasai
  - Reformed Community of Presbyterians
  - Presbyterian Community of Kinshasa
  - Evangelical Community in Congo
  - Protestant Community of Shaba
  - Presbyterian Community of Western Kasai/Reformed Presbyterian Community in Africa
- Congo, Republic
  - The Evangelical Church of the Congo
- Costa Rica
  - Costa Rican Evangelical Presbyterian Church
- Croatia
  - Reformed Christian Calvinist Church in Croatia
- Cuba
  - Presbyterian Reformed Church in Cuba
- Czech Republic
  - Evangelical Church of Czech Brethren
- Denmark
  - Reformed Synod of Denmark
- Dominican Republic
  - Dominican Evangelical Church
- East Timor
  - Christian Church in East Timor
- Ecuador
  - United Evangelical Church of Ecuador
- Egypt
  - The Evangelical Church - Synod of the Nile
- El Salvador
  - Reformed Calvinist Church of El Salvador
- Equatorial Guinea
  - Presbyterian Church of Equatorial Guinea
- Ethiopia
  - Ethiopian Evangelical Church Mekane Yesus
- France
  - Reformed Church of France
  - Reformed Church of Alsace and Lorraine
  - Malagazy Protestant Church
- French Polynesia
  - Evangelical Church of French Polynesia
- Germany
  - Church of Lippe
  - Evangelical Reformed Church
  - Reformed Alliance
- Ghana
  - Evangelical Presbyterian Church, Ghana
  - Presbyterian Church of Ghana
- Greece
  - Greek Evangelical Church
- Grenada
  - Presbyterian Church in Grenada
- Guatemala
  - National Evangelical Presbyterian Church of Guatemala
- Guyana
  - Presbyterian Church of Guyana
  - Guyana Congregational Union
  - Guyana Presbyterian Church
- Hong Kong
  - Church of Christ in China, The Hong Kong Council
- Hungary
  - Reformed Church of Hungary
- India
  - Church of South India
  - Church of North India
  - Presbyterian Church of India
  - Evangelical Church of Maraland
  - The Church of Christ
  - Reformed Presbyterian Church, North East India
- Indonesia
  - Karo Batak Protestant Church
  - Evangelical Church in Kalimantan
  - Indonesian Christian Church
  - Evangelical Christian Church in West Papua
  - Christian Churches of Java
  - The East Java Christian Church
  - Christian Church in Luwuk Banggai
  - Pasundan Christian Church
  - Protestant Christian Church in Bali
  - Christian Church in Sulawesi
  - Christian Church in Central Sulawesi
  - Christian Church of Southern Sumatra
  - Christian Church of Sumba
  - Christian Evangelical Church in Bolaang Mongondow
  - The Christian Evangelical Church in Halmahera
  - Christian Evangelical Church in Minahasa
  - Sangihe-Talaud Evangelical Church
  - Christian Evangelical Church in Timor
  - Protestant Church in West Indonesia
  - Indonesian Protestant Church in Buol Toli-Toli
  - Indonesian Protestant Church in Donggala
  - Indonesian Protestant Church in Gorontalo
  - Protestant Church in the Moluccas
  - Protestant Church in Southeast Sulawesi
  - Toraja Church
  - Toraja Mamasa Church
- Iran
  - Synod of Evangelical Church of Iran
- Ireland (Éire)
  - The Presbyterian Church in Ireland
- Israel
  - St. Andrew's Scots Memorial Church (Church of Scotland)
- Italy
  - Waldensian Evangelical Church (Union of Methodist and Waldensian Churches)
- Jamaica
  - The United Church in Jamaica and the Cayman Islands
- Japan
  - Church of Christ in Japan
  - Korean Christian Church in Japan
- Kenya
  - Presbyterian Church of East Africa
  - Reformed Church of East Africa
- Kiribati
  - Kiribati Protestant Church
- Korea, Republic of
  - KiJang
  - TongHap
  - DaeShin I
  - HapDongJeongTong
- Latvia
  - Reformed Church in Latvia
- Lebanon
  - Union of the Armenian Evangelical Churches in the Near East
  - National Evangelical Synod of Syria and Lebanon
  - The National Evangelical Union of Lebanon
- Lesotho
  - Lesotho Evangelical Church
- Liberia
  - Presbyterian Church of Liberia
- Lithuania
  - Synod of the Evangelical Reformed Church - Unitas Lithuaniae
- Luxembourg
  - Protestant Reformed Church of Luxemburg H.B.
- Madagascar
  - Church of Jesus Christ in Madagascar
- Malawi
  - Church of Central Africa, Presbyterian – General Synod
- Malaysia
  - Presbyterian Church Malaysia
- Marshall Island
  - Marshalls United Church of Christ-Congregations
  - Reformed Congregational Churches
- Mauritius
  - Presbyterian Church of Mauritius
- Mexico
  - National Presbyterian Church in Mexico, A. R.
  - Associate Reformed Presbyterian Church of Mexico
  - Presbyterian Reformed Church of Mexico
- Morocco
  - Evangelical Church in Morocco
- Mozambique
  - Presbyterian Church of Mozambique
  - United Congregational Church of Southern Africa
  - United Church of Christ in Mozambique
  - Evangelical Church of Christ in Mozambique
- Namibia
  - Namibia Regional Council
- Netherlands
  - The Protestant Church in the Netherlands (former: Nederlandse Hervormde Kerk and Gereformeerde Kerken in Nederland)
  - Remonstrant Brotherhood
- New Caledonia
  - Evangelical Church in New Caledonia and Loyalty Islands
- New Zealand
  - Presbyterian Church of Aotearoa New Zealand
- Niger
  - Evangelical Church of the Republic of Niger
- Nigeria
  - Presbyterian Church of Nigeria
  - Christian Reformed Church of Nigeria
  - Universal Reformed Christian Church (NKST)
  - Evangelical Reformed Church of Christ
  - Reformed Church of Christ in Nigeria
  - United Church of Christ in Nigeria
- Niue
  - Church of Niue
- Pakistan
  - Presbyterian Church of Pakistan
  - Sialkot Diocese of the Church of Pakistan
- Philippines
  - United Church of Christ in the Philippines
  - United Evangelical Church of Christ
- Poland
  - Evangelical-Reformed Church in Poland
- Portugal
  - Evangelical Presbyterian Church of Portugal
- Reunion
  - Eglise Protestante de La Réunion
- Romania
  - Reformed Church in Romania – Transylvanian District
  - Reformed Church in Romania (Oradea)
- Rwanda
  - Presbyterian Church in Rwanda
- Senegal
  - Protestant Church of Senegal
- Serbia and Montenegro
  - Reformed Christian Church in Serbia and Montenegro
- Singapore
  - Presbyterian Church in Singapore
- Slovakia
  - Reformed Church of Slovakia
- Slovenia
  - Reformed Church in Slovenia
- Solomon Islands
  - United Church in Solomon Islands
- South Africa
  - Nederduits Gereformeerde Kerk
  - Uniting Reformed Church in Southern Africa
  - Reformed Church in Africa (India)
  - Reformed Church in Southern Africa
  - Reformed Presbyterian Church in Southern Africa
  - United Congregational Church of Southern Africa
  - Peoples Church of Africa
  - Uniting Presbyterian Church in Southern Africa
- Spain
  - Spanish Evangelical Church
- Sri Lanka
  - Dutch Reformed Church in Sri Lanka (Ceylon)
  - Presbytery of Lanka
- Sudan
  - Presbyterian Church of the Sudan
- Sweden
  - The Mission Covenant Church of Sweden
- Switzerland
  - Federation of Swiss Protestant Churches, Schweizerischer Evangelischer Kirchenbund, Fédération des Eglises protestantes de la Suisse, Federazione delle Chiese evangelische della Svizzera
- Taiwan
  - Presbyterian Church in Taiwan
- Thailand
  - Church of Christ in Thailand
- Trinidad and Tobago
  - Church of Scotland
- Tunisia
  - Reformed Church in Tunisia
- Tuvalu
  - Church of Tuvalu
- Uganda
  - Reformed Presbyterian Church in Uganda
- Ukraine
  - Reformed Church in the Carpatho-Ukraine
- United Kingdom
  - Church of Scotland
  - Presbyterian Church of Wales
  - Union of Welsh Independents
  - United Free Church of Scotland
  - United Reformed Church
  - The Presbyterian Church in Ireland
  - Presbyterian Church of Africa
- United States of America
  - Reformed Church in America
  - United Church of Christ
  - Christian Reformed Church in North America
  - Cumberland Presbyterian Church
  - Cumberland Presbyterian Church in America
  - Evangelical Presbyterian Church
  - Korean Presbyterian Church in America
  - Lithuanian Evangelical Reformed Church
  - Presbyterian Church (USA)
- Uruguay
  - Valdensian Evangelical Church of the Rio de la Plata
- Vanuatu
  - Presbyterian Church of Vanuatu
- Venezuela
  - Presbyterian Church of Venezuela
- Zambia
  - United Church of Zambia
  - Reformed Church in Zambia
- Zimbabwe
  - Reformed Church in Zimbabwe
  - Church of Central Africa Presbyterian – Synod of Harare
  - Ndebele
- Central / Southern Africa
  - Dutch Reformed Church – Synod of Central Africa
  - Presbyterian Church of Southern Africa
