= National church =

Christian church associated with a specific ethnic group or nation state

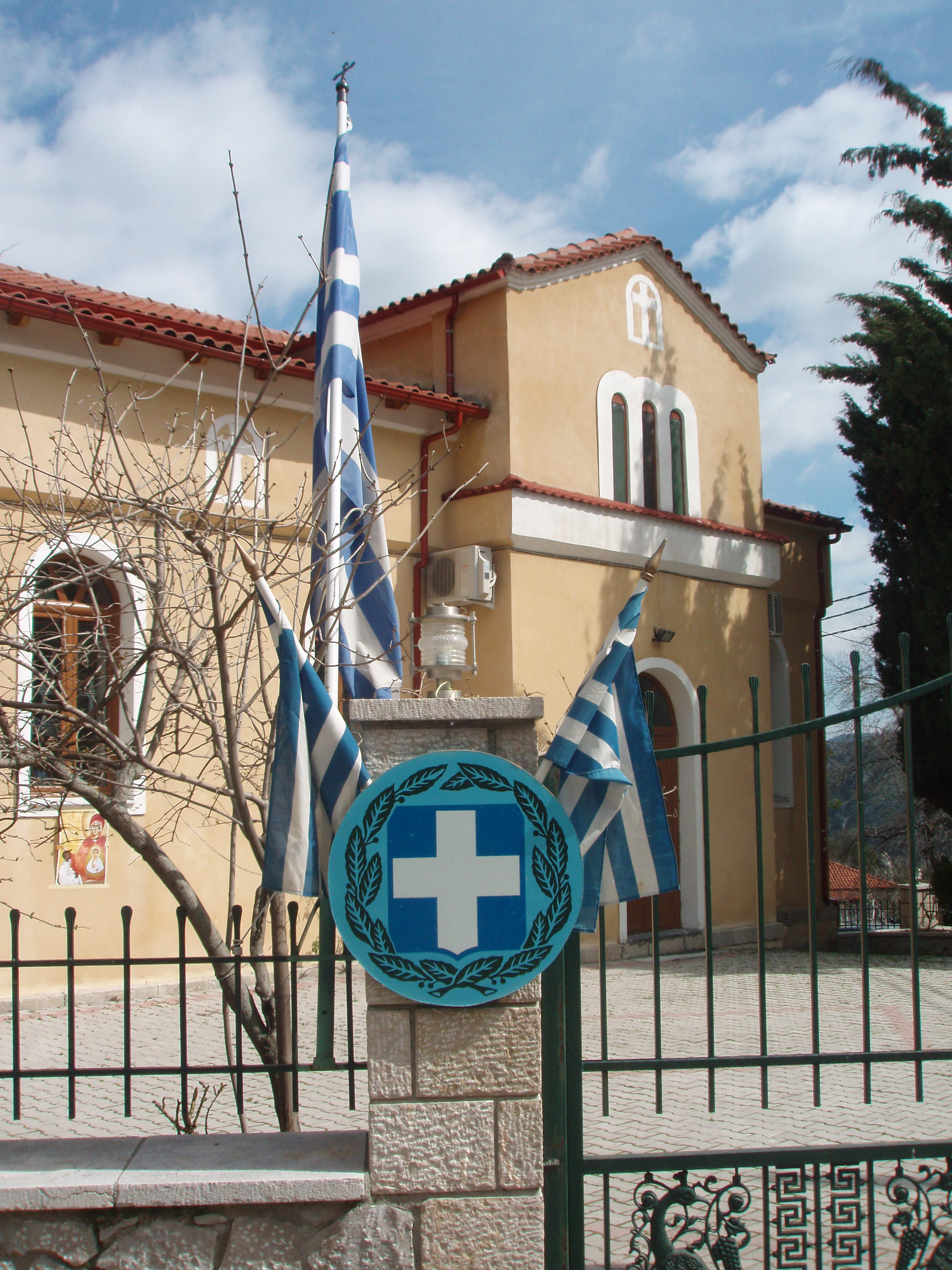
According to the constitution, Greek Orthodoxy is the prevailing religion of Greece; this is reinforced by displays of the Greek flag and coat of arms at church properties.

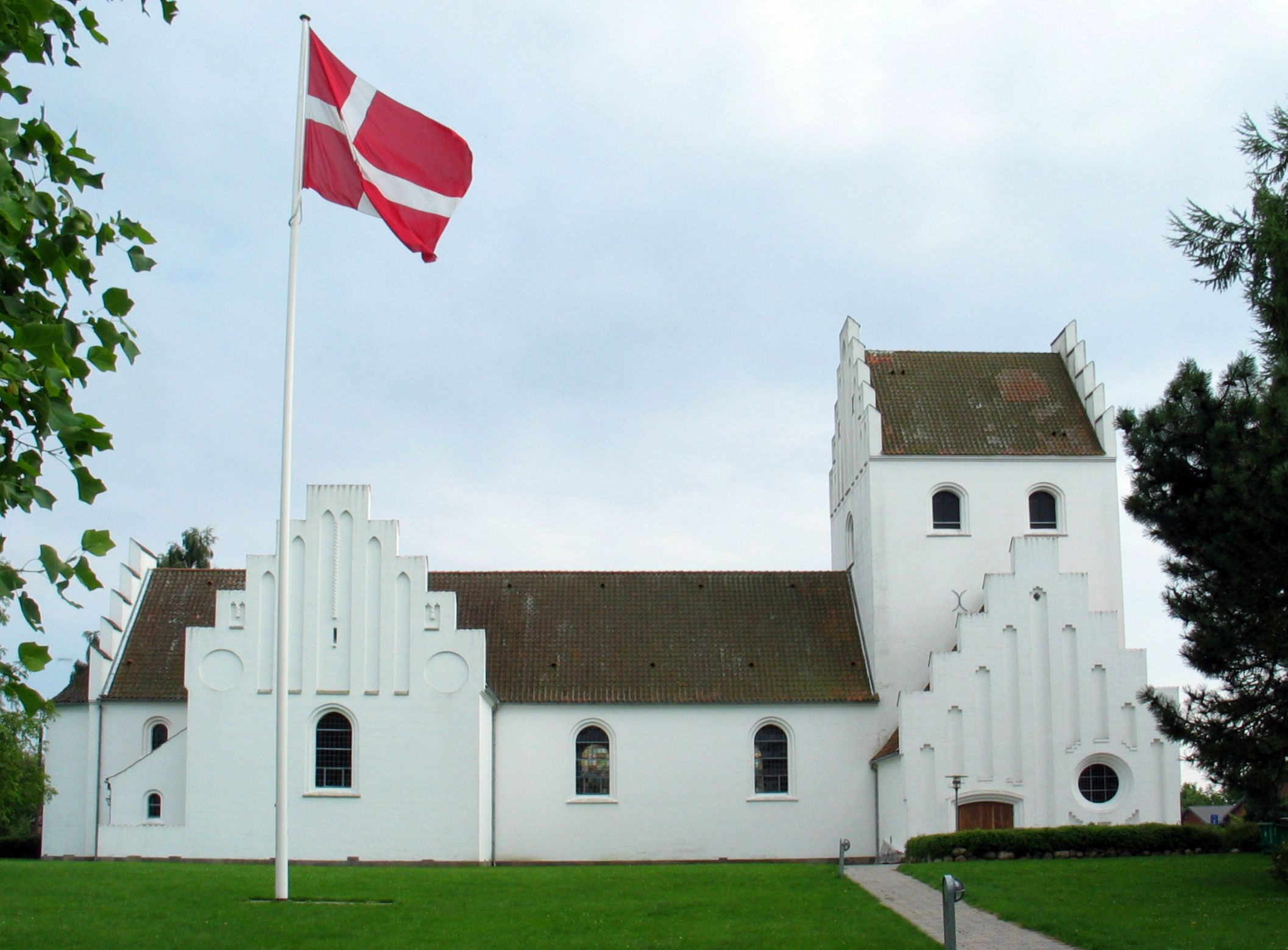
A Church of Denmark parish church in Holte, with the Dannebrog flying in its churchyard

A national church is a Christian church associated with a specific ethnic group or nation state. The idea was notably discussed during the 19th century, during the emergence of modern nationalism.

Samuel Taylor Coleridge, in a draft discussing the question of church and state around 1828 wrote that

"a National Church might exist, and has existed, without Christianity, because before the institution of the Christian Church – as [...] the Levitical Church in the Hebrew Constitution, [and] the Druidical in the Celtic, would suffice to prove".

John Wordsworth, Bishop of Salisbury, wrote about the National Church of Sweden in 1911, interpreting the Church of Sweden and the Church of England as national churches of the Swedish and the English peoples, respectively.

The concept of a national church remains alive in the Protestantism of United Kingdom and Scandinavia in particular. While, in a context of England, the national church remains a common denominator for the Church of England, some of the Lutheran "folk churches" of Scandinavia, characterized as national churches in the ethnic sense as opposed to the idea of a state church, emerged in the second half of the 19th century following the lead of Grundtvig. However, in countries in which the state church (also known as the established church) has the following of the majority of citizens, the state church may also be the national church, and may be declared as such by the government, e.g. Church of Denmark, Church of Greece, and Church of Iceland.

== Countries and regions with national churches ==
Country	National church	Denomination	Percentage
Armenia	Armenian Apostolic Church	Oriental Orthodox	95.2% (2022)
Bulgaria	Bulgarian Orthodox Church	Eastern Orthodox	62.7% (2021)
Canada	United Church of Canada	Mainline Protestant	3.3% (2021)
Cyprus	Church of Cyprus	Eastern Orthodox	89.1% (2011; government-controlled territory)
Denmark	Church of Denmark	Lutheran	74.3% (2020)
Ethiopia	Ethiopian Orthodox Tewahedo Church	Oriental Orthodox	43.5% (2007)
Eritrea	Eritrean Orthodox Tewahedo Church	Oriental Orthodox	
Faroe Islands	Church of the Faroe Islands	Lutheran	79.7% (2019)
Finland	Evangelical Lutheran Church of Finland, Orthodox Church of Finland	Lutheran Eastern Orthodox	65.2% (2022) 1.02% (2022)
Georgia	Georgian Orthodox Church	Eastern Orthodox	83.4% (2014)
Germany	Protestant Church in Germany Catholic Church	Protestant (Note: United Protestant: Lutheran and Reformed) Catholic	23.7% (2021) 26% (2021)
Greece	Church of Greece	Eastern Orthodox	90% (2017)
Iceland	Church of Iceland	Lutheran	59% (2022)
Latvia	Evangelical Lutheran Church of Latvia	Lutheran	34.2% (2011)
Liechtenstein	Catholic Church	Catholic	75.9% (2010)
Malta	Catholic Church	Catholic	83% (2019)
Montenegro	Serbian Orthodox Church	Eastern Orthodox	71.1% (2023)
North Macedonia	Macedonian Orthodox Church	Eastern Orthodox	64.4% (2011)
Norway	Church of Norway	Lutheran	69.91% (2018)
Romania	Romanian Orthodox Church	Eastern Orthodox	81.9% (2011)
Russia	Russian Orthodox Church	Eastern Orthodox	71% (2017)
Serbia	Serbian Orthodox Church	Eastern Orthodox	84.59% (2011)
Sweden	Church of Sweden	Lutheran	53.9% (2021)
Tuvalu	Church of Tuvalu	Calvinist	91%+ (2012)
Ukraine	Ukrainian Orthodox Church	Eastern Orthodox	52% (2021)
United Kingdom: England; Scotland	British Protestant Churches: Church of England; Church of Scotland	Protestant: Anglican; Calvinist	69%: 47.0% (2008; with Wales); 20.4% (2022)

=== Ethnic groups ===
Country	Group	National church	Denomination
Egypt	Copts	Coptic Orthodox Church of Alexandria	Oriental Orthodox
Egypt	Greek Christians	Greek Orthodox Church of Alexandria	Eastern Orthodox
Assyria	Assyrians	Assyrian Church of the East Chaldean Catholic Church Syriac Catholic Church Syriac Orthodox Church of Antioch	Church of the East Eastern Catholic Oriental Orthodox
Syria	Aramaeans	Syriac Orthodox Church of Antioch	Oriental Orthodox
Lebanon	Maronites	Maronite Catholic Church	Eastern Catholic
Lebanon	Armenian Apostolic Church	Holy See of Cilicia	Oriental Orthodox
Syria-Lebanon-Turkey	Antiochian Greek Christians	Greek Orthodox Church of Antioch	Eastern Orthodox
Levant-Egypt	Antiochian Greek Christians	Melkite Greek Catholic Church	Eastern Catholic
Turkey	Armenian Apostolic Church	Armenian Patriarchate of Constantinople	Oriental Orthodox
Turkey	Greek Christians	Ecumenical Patriarchate of Constantinople	Eastern Orthodox
India	Malankara Nasrani	Malankara Orthodox Syrian Church	Oriental Orthodox
India	Syrian Orthodox Christian	Jacobite Syrian Christian Church	Oriental Orthodox
India	Malankara Nasrani	Mar Thoma Syrian Church	Anglican Syriac
Indonesia	Balinese	Sacred Heart of Jesus Church, Palasari	Catholic
Indonesia	Balinese	Holy Trinity Church, Tuka	Catholic
Indonesia	Chinese Indonesians	Santa Maria de Fatima Church, Toasebio	Catholic
Indonesia	Betawi people	St. Servatius Church	Catholic
Indonesia	Javanese	Ganjuran Church	Catholic
Indonesia	Chinese Indonesians	Gereja Kristen Kalam Kudus	Calvinist
Indonesia	Dayak people	Evangelical Church in Kalimantan	Calvinist
Indonesia	Moluccans	Protestant Church of Maluku	Calvinist
Indonesia	Balinese	Protestant Christian Church in Bali	Calvinist
Indonesia	Sundanese	Pasundan Christian Church	Calvinist
Indonesia	Bugis	South Sulawesi Christian Church	Calvinist
Indonesia	Minahasans	Christian Evangelical Church in Minahasa	Calvinist
Indonesia	Javanese; Madurese	East Java Christian Church	Calvinist
Indonesia	Javanese	Javanese Christian Church	Calvinist
Indonesia	Torajan	Toraja Church	Calvinist
Indonesia	Torajan	Toraja Mamasa Church	Calvinist
Indonesia	Karo Batak	Karo Batak Protestant Church	Calvinist
Indonesia	Karo Batak	Karo Evangelical Church of Indonesia	Evangelical
Indonesia	Angkola Batak	Angkola Protestant Christian Church	Lutheran
Indonesia	Toba Batak	Batak Christian Protestant Church	Lutheran
Indonesia	Toba Batak	Batak Christian Community Church	Lutheran
Indonesia	Pakpak Batak	Pakpak Dairi Christian Protestant Church	Lutheran
Indonesia	Niasans	Protestant Christian Church of Nias	Lutheran
Indonesia	Simalungun Batak	Simalungun Protestant Christian Church	Lutheran

== Criticism ==
Swiss Reformed theologian Karl Barth denounced as heretical the tendency of "nationalizing" the Christian God, especially in the context of national churches sanctioning warfare against other Christian nations during World War I.

== See also ==
- Christian nationalism
- Christian amendment
- Christian right
- Christian state
- Phyletism
- State church
