= Communion of Churches in Indonesia =

Christian church in Indonesia

- Persekutuan Gereja-Gereja di Indonesia
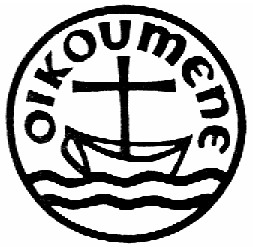
- Abbreviation: CCI / PGI
- Type: Fellowship of Protestant churches
- Classification: Protestant
- Orientation: Evangelicalism
- Chairman: Rev. Jacklevyn Frits Manuputty
- General Secretary: Rev. Darwin Darmawan
- Region: Indonesia
- Headquarters: Jalan Salemba Raya 10, Central Jakarta 10430
- Origin: 25 May 1950; 76 years ago
- Places of worship: 104 synod
- Other name: Council of Churches in Indonesia
- Official website: PGI.or.id
- Slogan: Creating One Christian Church in Indonesia

The Communion of Churches in Indonesia (CCI), Indonesian: Persekutuan Gereja-Gereja di Indonesia (PGI), is a fellowship organisation of Protestant churches in Indonesia. This fellowship was founded on 25 May 1950; 76 years ago, in Jakarta, the capital city of Indonesia, under the name Council of Churches in Indonesia (Dewan Gereja-Gereja di Indonesia – DGI) as a manifestation of the desire of Protestants in Indonesia to reunite the Protestant Church as the fragmented Body of Christ. Therefore, PGI stated that the aim of its formation was to create one Christian Church in Indonesia. It is a member of the World Council of Churches.

The Communion is the largest organisation of Christian Churches in Indonesia. In 2024, it had 104 member churches, and its chairman is the Reverend Jacklevyn Frits Manuputty. Its slogan is 'Creating One Christian Church in Indonesia'.

== History ==
On 6 to 13 November 1949, a Preparatory Conference for the Council of Churches in Indonesia was held. As is known, before World War II, efforts had been made to establish a Council to oversee the work of Zending; however, due to the outbreak of World War II, this intention was postponed. After World War II, three Regional Councils were established, namely the Consultative Council of Churches in Indonesia based in Yogyakarta (May 1946), the Joint Business Council of Churches in Eastern Indonesia based in Makasar (9 March 1947), and the Council of Churches in Eastern Indonesia. Sumatran part of the church (early 1949) based in Medan.

These three regional councils were established with the aim of forming one Council of Churches in Indonesia, which encompasses the three councils. On 21 to 28 May 1950, the Conference for the Formation of the Council of Churches in Indonesia (DGI) was held, at the High Theological School (now the Jakarta Theological College). Some of those attending the conference were:

1. Batak Christian Protestant Church
2. Batak Karo Protestant Church
3. Methodist Church in Indonesia
4. Banua Niha Keriso Protestant
5. Kalimantan Evangelical Church
6. Protestant Church in Western Indonesia
7. Gereformeerde Kerken in Indonesia
8. Pasundan Christian Church
9. Christian Church Around Muria
10. Central Java Christian Church
11. East Java Christian Church
12. Chinese Kie Tok Kauw Hwee / Khoe Hwee West Java
13. Chinese Kie Tok Kauw Hwee / Khoe Hwee Central Java
14. Chinese Kie Tok Kauw Hwee / Khoe Hwee East Java
15. Chinese Kie Tok Kauw Hwee / Khoe Hwee Jakarta
16. Protestant Christian Church in Bali
17. Christian Church of Sumba
18. Christian Evangelical Church in Timor
19. Christian Evangelical Church in Sangihe-Talaud
20. Christian Evangelical Church in Minahasa
21. Christian Evangelical Church in Bolaang Mongondow
22. Central Sulawesi Christian Church
23. GKTR
24. GKTM
25. Protestant Church in Southeast Sulawesi
26. South Sulawesi Christian Church
27. Evangelical Christian Church in Halmahera
28. Protestant Church of Maluku
29. Irian Evangelical Church
30. Protestant Church in Indonesia

== DGI formation manifesto ==
One of the agendas for the conference was a discussion of the DGI Articles of Association. On 25 May 1950, the DGI Articles of Association were approved by the conference participants, and this date was determined as the founding date of the Council of Churches in Indonesia (Indonesian: Dewan Gereja-Gereja di Indonesia) (DGI) in a text 'DGI Formation Manifesto':

Original version of the text:

"Kami anggota-anggota Konferensi Pembentoekan Dewan Geredja-geredja di Indonesia, mengoemoemkan dengan ini, bahwa sekarang Dewan geredja-geredja di Indonesia telah diperdirikan, sebagai tempat permoesjawaratan dan oesaha bersama dari Geredja-geredja di Indonesia, seperti termaktoeb dalam Anggaran Dasar Dewan geredja-geredja di Indonesia, yang soedah ditetapkan oleh Sidang pada tanggal 25 Mei 1950. Kami pertjaja, bahwa dewan Geredja-geredja di Indonesia adalah karoenia Allah bagi kami di Indonesia sebagai soeatoe tanda keesaan Kristen jang benar menoedjoe pada pembentoekan satoe Geredja di Indonesia menoeroet amanat Jesoes Kristoes, Toehan dan Kepala Geredja, kepada oematNja, oentoek kemoeliaan nama Toehan dalam doenia ini."

in English:

"We, members of the Conference for the Establishment of the Council of Churches in Indonesia, hereby announce that the Council of Churches in Indonesia has now been established, as a place for deliberation and joint efforts of the Churches in Indonesia, as stated in the Articles of Association of the Council of Churches in Indonesia, which was established by the Assembly on 25 May 1950. We believe that the Council of Churches in Indonesia is God's gift to us in Indonesia as a sign of true Christian unity towards on the formation of one Church in Indonesia according to the mandate of Jesus Christ, God and Head of the Church, to His people, for the glory of God's name in this world."

Thus, DGI has become a forum for churches in Indonesia to gather. Its members are increasing over time. As the number of members continues to grow, it will increasingly show the spirit of togetherness to unite in the ecumenical movement in Indonesia. Within the PGI platform, churches in Indonesia which have diverse theological backgrounds, denominations, ethnicities, races, cultural traditions, and ecclesiastical traditions; are no longer seen in terms of differences that separate them, but are accepted as valuable assets in enriching the life of churches as Christ body. Along with this development and spirit of togetherness, this is also what underlies the change of name 'Council of Churches in Indonesia' to 'Fellowship of Churches in Indonesia' as decided at the Xth General Assembly in Ambon in 1984. The name change occurred based on the consideration: "that Communion is more ecclesiastical than the word council, because the council is more indicative of diversity in togetherness between member churches, while communion is more indicative of inner and outer bonds between churches in the process towards unity."

Thus, the name change contains a change in meaning. Fellowship is a Biblical term that touches on the existential, internal and spiritual aspects of the togetherness of one Christian community. In accordance with PGI's confession that Jesus Christ is Lord and Saviour of the world and Head of the Church, the source of Truth and Life, who gathers and grows the church according to the Word of God, since the founding of PGI, the churches have been committed to declaring one and one church in Indonesia. This unity is demonstrated through togetherness in testimony and service, fellowship, mutual aid and assistance. Therefore, PGI does not intend to homogenise the churches in Indonesia, and PGI also does not want to become a 'super church' that dominates the member churches, but the unity in question is unity in action, meaning oneness that increasingly grows and develops when carrying out joint activities in a shared vision and mission.

Until 2024, PGI had gathered 104 member churches and more than 15 million congregation members spread from Merauke to Sabang and from Rote to Talaud. PGI membership represents 80 percent of Christians in Indonesia. With the symbol of 'oikoumene', PGI member churches are optimistic about working and serving in Indonesia and the world. In addition to strengthening relationships between its member churches, PGI is also called to collaborate and build partnerships with churches and other ecumenical institutions, and between religions, both at national and international levels. This partnership relationship is intended to create religious harmony and human welfare in Indonesia in particular and the world in general.

== See also ==
- Bishops' Conference of Indonesia
