= Christian Conference of Asia =

Regional ecumenical organisation

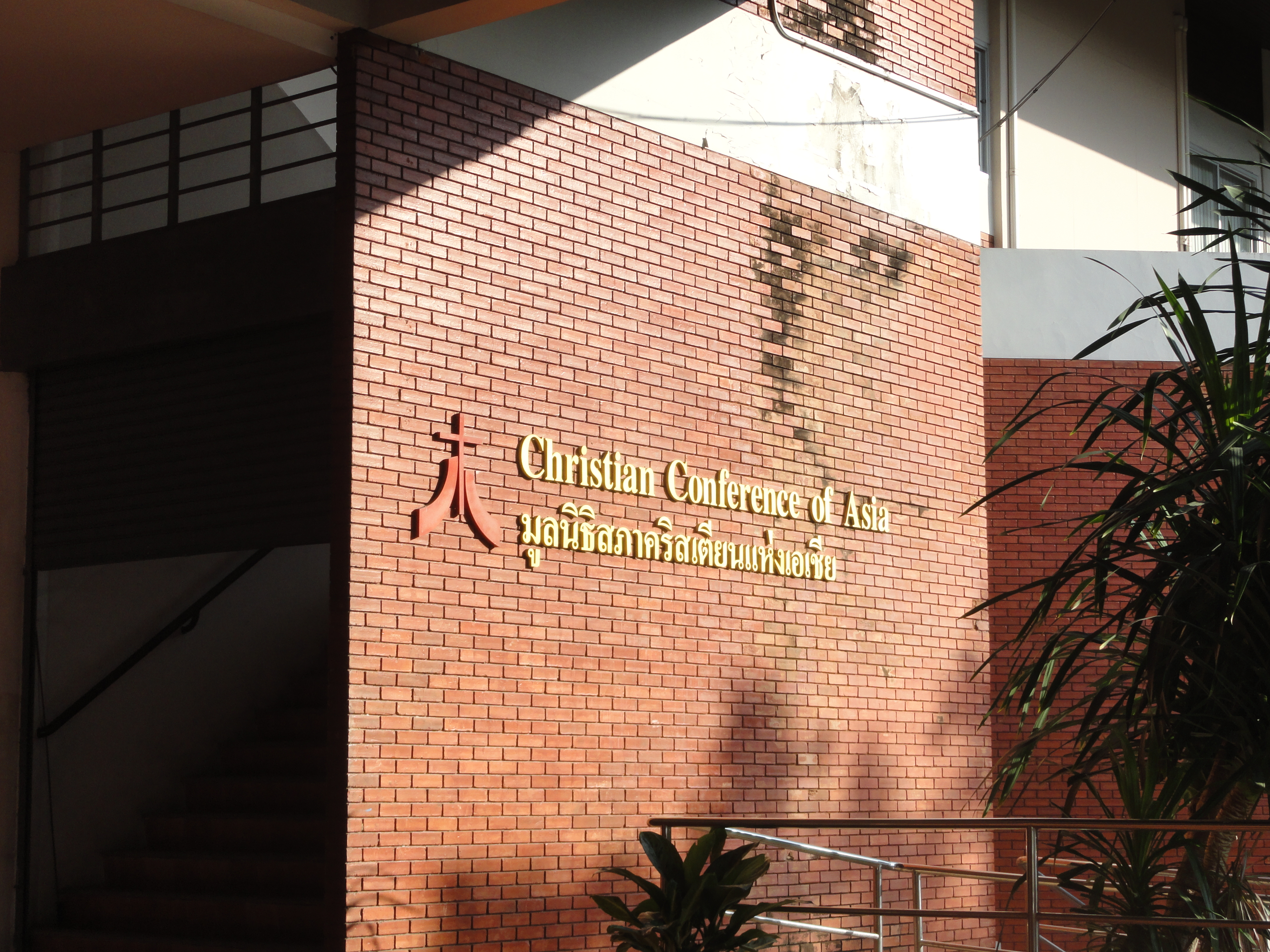
CCA Office, Payap University, Chiang Mai

The Christian Conference of Asia is a regional ecumenical organisation representing 15 National Councils and over 100 denominations (churches) in New Zealand, Australia, Bangladesh, Burma, Cambodia, East Timor, Hong Kong, India, Indonesia, Laos, Japan, Korea, Malaysia, Pakistan, Philippines, Sri Lanka, Taiwan and Thailand.

These councils and churches are committed to working together in mission, leadership development, ecumenical relationships, and issues of social justice such as human rights, peace and reconciliation, poverty alleviation, and interfaith dialogue.

The offices of the Christian Conference of Asia have been located in Payap University, Chiang Mai, Thailand; since 2006. In 2023, the General Secretary (since 2015) is Dr Mathews George Chunakara.

== History ==
Representatives of churches, national council of churches, and Christian councils decided to constitute the East Asian Christian Conference during a meeting at Prapat, Indonesia in 1957. It was inaugurated at an assembly in Kuala Lumpur, Malaysia in 1957 under the theme Witnessing Together. The fifth Assembly in 1973, meeting in Singapore, decided to change the name to Christian Conference of Asia (CCA). It established its regional offices in Singapore at Toa Payoh Methodist Church in 1974.

The organisation operated from Singapore until its expulsion from the country in 1987, when the Singaporean government charged that it was engaging in political activities and had broken a promise of not doing so. The organisation's assets were frozen and eventually returned in 1988. Member churches and council in Singapore, the Methodist Church of Singapore, the Anglican Church of Singapore and Singapore's National Council of Church withdrew from the organisation, leaving it with no official representations from Singapore since. The organisation replied to the charges that there was a 'basic misunderstanding of the role of the Church in society and the way which church and state relate to each other'.

The CCA and the Catholic-run Federation of Asian Bishops' Conferences worked together to found the Asian Movement for Christian Unity in 1994; the Evangelical Fellowship of Asia joined the movement in 2007.

In October 2017, the organisation celebrated its 60th anniversary with an event in Yangon.

== Member churches ==
- New Zealand (5)
  - Anglican Church in Aotearoa, New Zealand and Polynesia
  - Christian Churches, New Zealand
  - Methodist Church of New Zealand
  - Presbyterian Church of Aotearoa New Zealand
  - Religious Society of Friends
- Australia (5)
  - Anglican Church of Australia
  - Armenian Apostolic Church, Diocese of Australia and New Zealand
  - Churches of Christ in Australia
  - Coptic Orthodox Diocese of Sydney & Affiliated Regions and SE Asia
  - Uniting Church in Australia
- Bangladesh (4)
  - Bangladesh Baptist Fellowship
  - Bangladesh Baptist Church Sangha
  - Church of Bangladesh
  - Evangelical Christian Church
- Hong Kong SAR, China (4)
  - Church of Christ in China
  - Sheng Kung Hui (Anglican Church)
  - The Methodist Church, Hong Kong
  - The Salvation Army, Hong Kong and Macau Command
- India (12)
  - Church of North India
  - Church of South India
  - Council of Baptist Churches in Northeast India
  - Hindustani Covenant Church
  - Jacobite Syrian Orthodox Church
  - Malabar Independent Syrian Church
  - Malankara Orthodox Syrian Church
  - Malankara Mar Thoma Syrian Church
  - Methodist Church in India
  - Presbyterian Church in India
  - Samavesam of Telugu Baptist Churches
  - United Evangelical Lutheran Church in India (UELCI)
- Indonesia (31)
  - Banua Niha Keriso Protestan (BNKP) (Nias Protestant Christian Church)
  - Gereja Batak Karo Protestan (GBKP) (Karo Batak Protestant Church)
  - Gereja Isa Almasih (GIA)
  - Gereja Kalimantan Evangelis (GKE) (Kalimantan Evangelical Church)
  - Gereja Kristen Indonesia (GKI) (Indonesia Christian Church)
  - Gereja Kristen Injili Di Tanah Papua (GKI-Tanah Papua) (Evangelical Christian Church in Tanah Papua)
  - Greja Kristen Jawi Wetan (Christian Church of Eastern Java)
  - Gereja Kristen Pasundan (GKP) (Pasundan Christian Church)
  - Gereja Kristen Protestan Angkola (GKPA)
  - Gereja Kristen Protestan Bali (GKPB) (Protestant Christian Church in Bali)
  - Gereja Kristen Protestan Indonesia (GKPI) (Christian Protestant Church in Indonesia)
  - Gereja Kristen Protestan Simalungun (GKPS) (Simalungun Protestant Christian Church)
  - Gereja Kristen Sulawesi Tengah (GKST) (Central Sulawesi Christian Church)
  - Gereja Kristen Sumba (GKS) (Christian Church of Sumba)
  - Gereja Methodis Indonesia (GMI)
  - Gereja Masehi Injili di Bolaang Mongondow (GMIBM)
  - Gereja Masehi Injili Halmahera (GMIH)
  - Gereja Masehi Injili Minahasa (GMIM) (The Christian Evangelical Church in Minahasa)
  - Gereja Masehi Injili Sangihe Talaud (GMIST) (Evangelical Church of Sangir Talaud)
  - Gereja Masehi Injili di Timor (GMIT) (Protestant Evangelical Church in Timor)
  - Gereja Protestan di Indonesia Bagian Barat (GPIB)
  - Gereja Protestan di Sulawesi Tenggara (GEPSULTRA)
  - Gereja Punguan Kristen Batak (GPKB) (Batak Christian Community Church)
  - Gereja Protestan Maluku (GPM) (Protestant Church in the Moluccas)
  - Gereja Toraja (Toraja Church)
  - Huria Kristen Batak Protestan (HKBP) (Batak Christian Protestant Church)
  - Huria Kristen Indonesia (HKI) (The Indonesian Christian Church)
  - Kerapatan Gereja Protestan Minahasa (KGPM)
  - Persatuan Gereja Gereja Kristen Muria Indonesia (GKMI)
  - Sinode Gerejagereja Kristen Jawa (GKJ) (Javanese Christian Churches)
  - Sinode Gereja Kristen Oikoumene di Indonesia (GKO) (The Synod of the Oikoumene Christian Church in Indonesia)
- Iran (1)
  - Armenian Orthodox Church of Iran
- Japan (3)
  - Korean Christian Church in Japan
  - Nihon Kirisuto Kyodan (United Church of Christ in Japan)
  - Nippon Sei Ko Kai (Anglican)
- Korea (7)
  - Anglican Church of Korea
  - Korean Evangelical Churches
  - Korean Methodist Church
  - Presbyterian Church in the Republic of Korea
  - Presbyterian Church of Korea
  - Salvation Army
- Laos (1)
  - Lao Evangelical Church
- Malaysia (3)
  - Church of the Province of South East Asia
    - Diocese of Sabah
    - Diocese of Kuching
    - Diocese of West Malaysia
  - Evangelical Lutheran Church in Malaysia and Singapore
  - Methodist Church in Malaysia
- Myanmar (7)
  - Myanmar Baptist Convention
  - Church of the Province of Myanmar
  - Independent Presbyterian Church of Myanmar
  - Mara Evangelical Church
  - Methodist Church, Lower Myanmar
  - Methodist Church, Upper Myanmar
  - Presbyterian Church of Myanmar
- Pakistan (2)
  - Church of Pakistan
  - Presbyterian Church of Pakistan
- Philippines (10)
  - Convention of Philippine Baptist Churches
  - Iglesia Evangelica Metodista en las Islas Filipinas (Evangelical Methodist Church in the Philippines)
  - Iglesia Unida Ekyumenikal
  - Iglesia Filipina Independiente (Philippine Independent Church)
  - Apostolic Catholic Church (Philippines)
  - The Episcopal Church in the Philippines
  - Lutheran Church in the Philippines
  - United Church of Christ in the Philippines (UCCP)
  - The United Methodist Church in the Philippines
  - The Salvation Army Philippines
- Sri Lanka (3)
  - Sri Lanka Baptist Sangamaya
  - Church of Ceylon
  - Methodist Church in Sri Lanka
- Taiwan (3)
  - Episcopal Church
  - Methodist Church in the Republic of China
  - Presbyterian Church in Taiwan
- Thailand (1)
  - Church of Christ in Thailand
- East Timor (1)
  - Igreja Protestante Timor Loro Sae (IPTL)

== Member Councils ==
- Te Runanga Whakawhanaunga I Nga Hahi O Aotearoa
- National Council of Churches in Australia
- National Council of Churches in Bangladesh
- National Christian Council of Bhutan
- Hong Kong Christian Council
- National Council of Churches in India
- Communion of Churches in Indonesia
- National Christian Council in Japan
- Kampuchea Christian Council
- National Council of Churches in Korea
- Council of Churches of Malaysia
- Myanmar Council of Churches
- National Council of Churches of Nepal
- National Council of Churches in the Philippines
- National Christian Council of Sri Lanka
- National Council of Churches of Taiwan

== Associated bodies ==
- Australian Student Christian Movement
- National Council of Churches in Australia
- World Council of Churches
- World Student Christian Federation

== See also ==
- Religion in Asia
- Christianity in Asia
