= Angkola Protestant Christian Church =

Church Christian Protestant synod in Indonesia

Angkola Protestant Christian Church Gereja Kristen Protestan Angkola
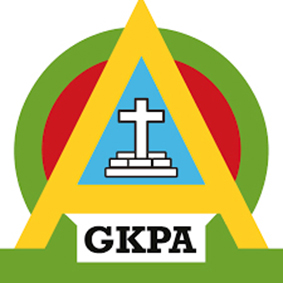
- Classification: Protestant
- Leader: Ephorus Pdt. Togar Satria Simatupang, M.Th
- Associations: WCC; CCA; LWF; PGI
- Region: Indonesia
- Language: Batak Angkola
- Origin: de facto October 26, 1975, formally August 1, 1976; Sumatra Utara
- Separated from: HKBP
- Merger of: Gereja Protestan Angkola (GPA), Gereja Mennonit Mandailing (GMM), dan Huria Kristen Batak Protestan – Angkola (HKBP-A)
- Members: 34,390
- Official website: www.gkpa.or.id
- Slogan: Parlagutan Na Dumenggan Mangkobasi Rap Sauduran (Gereja Yang Unggul Melayani Dalam Kebersamaan) (2016)

Angkola Protestant Christian Church or Christian Protestant Angkola Church (Indonesian: Gereja Kristen Protestan Angkola) abbreviated as GKPA, is a church Christian Protestant synod in Indonesia with its head office in Padangsidimpuan, North Sumatra province. This church organization was officially established on October 26, 1975, when it obtained autonomy from Huria Kristen Batak Protestant (HKBP), under the name HKBP-A. In 1988 it merged with the "Angkola Protestant Church (GPA)", and began to take the name "Angkola Protestant Christian Church". GKPA serves specifically the Angkola Batak community in their local language.

== Doctrine ==
GKPA acknowledges that Jesus Christ is Lord, Savior and Head of the Church as witnessed by the Old Testament (Deuteronomy 7:6) and New Testament (Matthew 16:18; Ephesians 4:5), because no one can lay a foundation other than the foundation that has been laid, which is Jesus Christ (1 Corinthians 3:11).

GKPA belongs to God (1 Corinthians 3:23), providing ecclesiastical services based on the Love, Truth, Justice and Peace of Jesus Christ, the head of the Church.

== History ==
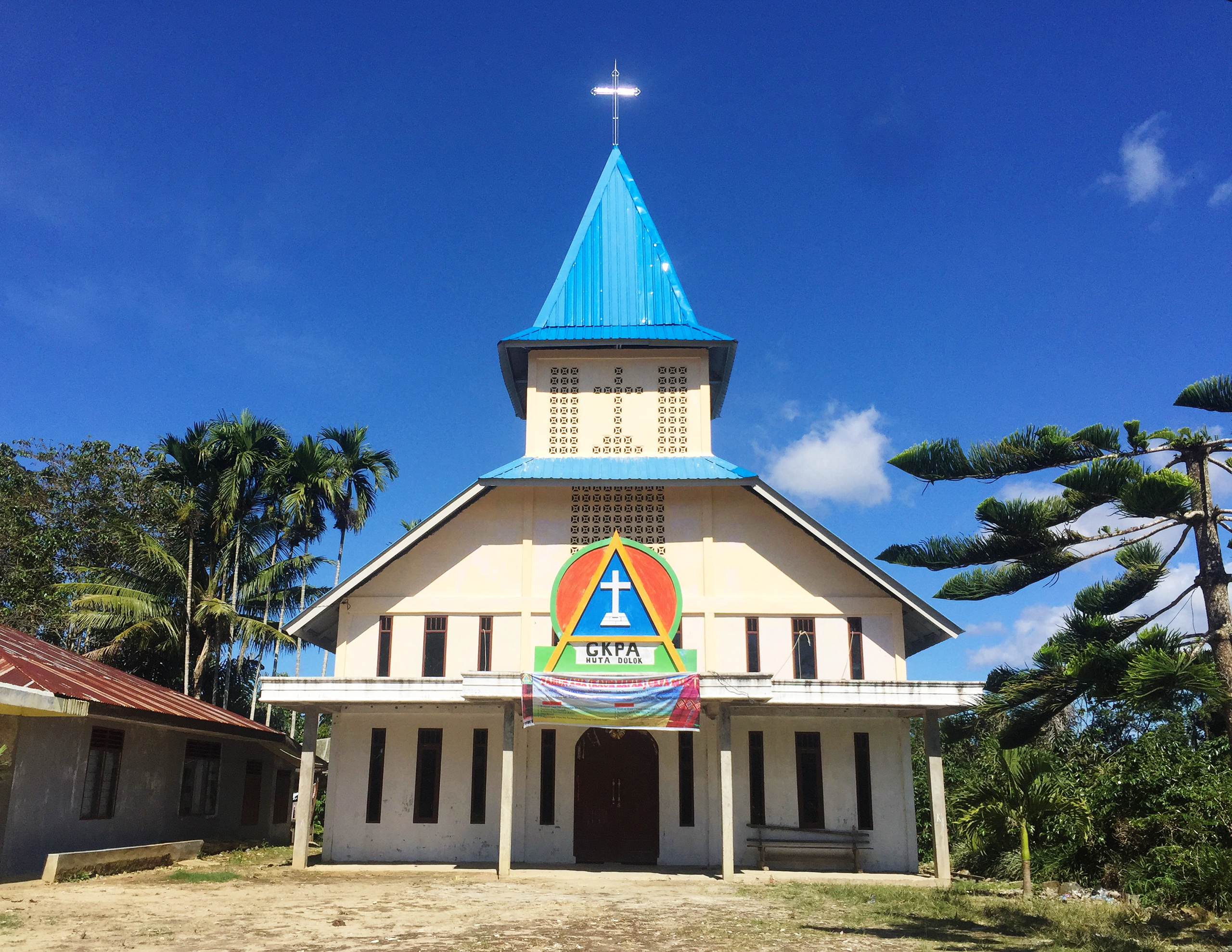
GKPA Huta Dolok, in Pangaribuan, North Tapanuli regency, North Sumatra.

GKPA was originally part of the Huria Kristen Batak Protestant (HKBP) congregation. To show its characteristics the letter A (Angkola) was added after the name of the HKBP, for example the name of the church that was formed in the 1940s in the Bona Bulu Luat area of Angkola was named HKBPA. Then this congregation was expanded and became an independent synod with the name "Gereja Kristen Protestan Angkola – GKPA" (Angkola Protestant Christian Church). Then GKPA an independent legal entity, head office domiciled in Padangsidimpuan city, North Sumatra province, Indonesia.

The Angkola Protestant Christian Church (GKPA) has been independent and recognized by the Government in accordance with the Recognition Letter of the Ministry of Religion of the Republic of Indonesia No. 1 Ket/413/159277 (October 19, 1997), No. 75 (March 10, 1988) and No. 21 of 1995 based on UU no. 8/1985 Tambahan Berita Negara R.I No.17 Tanggal 26/2-1999.

== Partnership ==
GKPA is a member of the Communion of Churches in Indonesia (CCI) or PGI – Persekutuan Gereja-Gereja di Indonesia, Christian Conference of Asia (CCA), Lutheran World Federation (LWF). Also listed as a member of World Council of Churches (WCC) since 1990.
