= Batak Christian Community Church =

Protestant denomination in Indonesia

The Batak Christian Community Church (Indonesian: Gereja Punguan Kristen Batak) is a Lutheran denomination church in Indonesia. The church came around the time of internal conflict in Batak Christian Protestant Church in 1917. It is a member of the Lutheran World Federation, which it joined in 1972. It is affiliated with the Christian Conference of Asia, the Communion of Churches in Indonesia, and the World Council of Churches.
