= Maranatha Christian University =

University in West Java, Indonesia

Coordinates: 6.8864°S 107.5807°E

- Universitas Kristen Maranatha
- Motto: Integrity, Care, and Excellence
- Type: Private
- Established: 11 September 1965; 60 years ago
- Religious affiliation: Protestant
- Rector: Prof. Ir. Sri Widiyantoro, M.Sc., Ph.D., IPU
- Address: Jl. Prof.drg. Suria Sumantri, MPH No. 65 Bandung 40164, Bandung, West Java, Indonesia
- Sporting affiliations: LIMA
- Mascot: Ice Bears
- Website: http://www.maranatha.edu/

Maranatha Christian University (Indonesian: Universitas Kristen Maranatha) abbreviated as Maranatha or Marnat, is one of the oldest and most prestigious private universities in Indonesia, located in Bandung, the largest metropolitan city and the capital city of West Java, Indonesia.

Maranatha Christian University has produced more than 30,000 alumni that contribute in development sectors in Indonesia and abroad. This contribution is continuously supported by cooperation programs with other educational, governmental, and social institutions, as well as industrial organizations and cooperating partners from inside and outside the country.

== History ==
The history of Maranatha Christian University began on September 11, 1965 with the establishment of Yayasan Perguruan Tinggi Kristen Maranatha by Badan Pendidikan Kristen Komisi Pembantu Setempat (the Local Branch of Christian Education Commissioning Board) of Gereja Kristen Indonesia (Indonesian Christian Church) and Badan Perguruan Tinggi dan Pendidikan Kristen (the Board for Tertiary and Christian Education) of Gereja Kristen Pasundan (Pasundan Christian Church) on the instigation of the Bandung branch of Perkumpulan Inteligensia Kristen Indonesia (the Association of Indonesian Christian Intelligence). Maranatha Christian University then officially began its operation with the establishment of Faculty of Medicine.

The first campus building on Jalan Cihampelas was built in 1970, followed by a second one on Jalan Suria Sumantri in 1983. Since then, Maranatha Christian University has continued developing its facilities and infrastructure in the second campus, the area of which reaches 130,000 square meters. The university has plans to expand its campus to other strategic locations.

== Faculties ==
Maranatha Christian University currently consists of 9 faculties with 4 diploma programs, 18 undergraduate programs, 3 professional programs, and 4 graduate programs. It comprises more than 10,000 Indonesian students, as well as students from other countries.

== Profession programs ==
- Doctor Profession Education Program
- Dentist Profession Education Program
