= Methodist Church in Indonesia =

Methodist Church in Indonesia Gereja Methodist Indonesia
- Classification: Protestant
- Orientation: Methodist
- Scripture: Bible
- Theology: Methodism
- Polity: Connexionalism
- Leader: Region I : Bishop Kristi Wilson Sinurat, S.Th., M.Pd. Region II : Bishop Sabam Lumbantobing, M.A. Region of Development : Bishop David Wu
- Associations: World Methodist Council, Christian Conference of Asia, World Council of Churches
- Region: Indonesia
- Origin: 1964
- Branched from: Southeast Asia Central Conference, The Methodist Church
- Congregations: 469
- Members: 119,000
- Ministers: 232
- Primary schools: 48
- Secondary schools: 62
- Tertiary institutions: 2

The Methodist Church in Indonesia or GMI (Indonesian: Gereja Methodist Indonesia) is a body within the Methodist tradition in Indonesia. GMI is jointly presided by three bishops, each representing the component annual conferences within the church.

== History ==
Initial Methodist mission work was pioneered by American Methodist missionaries already established in Malaya and Singapore. The first Methodist service was conducted in 1904 by the Rev. George F. Pykett, a missionary and educationalist with the Methodist Mission in Malaya. He was then followed by the Rev S. S. Pakianathan who planted churches as well as schools from 1905 to 1918 in Medan, Buitenzorg (present day Bogor), and Palembang.

Pakianathan's pioneering work provided the foundation from which American Methodist missionaries who came later were to build upon. Within the first decade, the Methodist mission grew rapidly in North Sumatera, Palembang, Java and parts of Kalimantan. Due to the vast distances involved, the lack of well developed transportation infrastructure, as well as localised opposition from the Dutch authorities and local Christians who were mainly from the Calvinist tradition, mission work was eventually restricted to North Sumatera and Java by 1928.

The Methodist missionaries stationed in Medan started by reaching out the ethnic Chinese migrant community but initially found little success compared to their counterparts working in Java. Conversely, they had better success working with the Batak community. The Batak Christians were initially evangelised through the mass conversion by the Lutheran Rhenish Missionary Society during the nineteenth century and early twentieth century. The Rhenish Missionary Society, overwhelmed by the mass conversion, had come to an arrangement with the Methodist mission whereby Bataks who had moved to the cities of North Sumatera would be cared for by the Methodists.

The Chinese community became more responsive in the 1930s and 1940s when Chinese Methodists started migrating to Medan and North Sumatera in larger numbers. The ministry of the fiery Chinese evangelist, Dr John Sung also had a great impact in the growth of ethnic Chinese churches in the whole of South East Asia.

As a result of the Indonesia–Malaysia confrontation that started in 1963, it no longer became tenable to administer the mission work from the headquarters of the Southeast Asian Central Conference in Singapore. As a result, the General Conference of The Methodist Church granted autonomy to the mission and the Methodist Church in Indonesia was formed in May 1964.

The Methodist Church in Indonesia has since extended its work to other parts of Indonesia including Kalimantan and Sulawesi.

== Belief and practices ==
Historically, the Chinese Methodists were heavily influenced by John Sung and as such are closer in teaching and liturgy to their ethnic Chinese Christian counterparts in the region. The Batak Methodists were more heavily influenced by the teachings and liturgy of the Lutheran Batak Protestant Christian Church. It was noted that in the first half of the twentieth century, there was an "unwritten agreement that members of the HKBP could become members of Methodist Batak congregations and the reverse could also occur".

This situation has slowly changed as a more uniquely Indonesian Methodist identity has emerged since the Methodist Church in Indonesia gained its autonomy in 1964 and improvements in social interactions between the various communities in Indonesia developed.

== Membership ==
The membership of the Methodist Church in Indonesia is 70 percent Batak and 20 percent Chinese, with the remaining 10 percent being persons from other ethnic groups.

== Organisation ==
=== Governance ===
The Methodist Church in Indonesia is divided into two annual conferences which are further subdivided into 12 geographical districts.

- Region 1 Annual Conference (Indonesian: KONTA Wilayah I)

Based in Medan, North Sumatera led by Bishop Kristi Wilson Sinurat, S.Th., M.Pd.

- Region 2 Annual Conference (Indonesian: KONTA Wilayah II)

Based in Jakarta, Java led by Bishop Sabam Lumbantobing, M.A.

- Region of Development Annual Conference (Indonesian: KONTA Wilayah Pengembangan)

Based in INDONESIA, North Sumatera led by Bishop TAHIR WIDJADJA

=== Education ===
Education has been a vital aspect of the work of the Methodist Church in Indonesia since the beginning and now administers 48 elementary schools, 40 junior and 22 senior high schools, one university and two seminaries throughout the country.

=== Statistics ===
- Number of churches: 790 churches
- Number of congregations: 383 congregations
- Number of congregation members: 120,000 people
- Number of priests: 400 priests
- Number of other ministers: 1078 other ministers (emeritus, viscars and missionaries)

== See also ==
- Christianity in Indonesia
