= International Congregational Council =

The International Congregational Council was a worldwide association of Congregational churches that was founded in 1891 and merged with the Alliance of the Reformed Churches Throughout the World Holding the Presbyterian Order to form the World Alliance of Reformed Churches.

== Background and first Council ==
The idea for a world Congregational congress was first mooted in 1874 by Hastings Ross in an article entitled "An Ecumenical Council of Congregational Churches in Congregational Quarterly. His article was widely distributed in the United States, Canada, and Great Britain. The idea was discussed at the 1880 Triennial Council of the Congregational Churches in the United States and on June 7, 1884, the Congregational Union of Ontario and Quebec approved the idea at its annual meeting in Montreal. The Canadian resolution asked the Congregational Union of England and Wales to consider the feasibility of such a meeting. The Congregational Union of England and Wales approved the idea, but practical steps to the congress only came after the Congregational Union of New South Wales approved the idea at a meeting in Melbourne in 1888. Two requests for a convention were formally presented to the Congregational Union of England and Wales in May 1889 and official adopted by the union. In October of that year the American Congregationalist unanimously approved the idea of the gathering at its Triennial Council in Worcester, Massachusetts, after being formally invited by the English. After much correspondence and deliberations by arrangement committees the First International Congregational Council opened in London at Memorial Hall on July 13, 1891. The Council finished its work on July 21, and an arrangements committee was set up to work with the National Council of the US Congregational Churches to convent the next Council in that country

== Subsequent Councils ==
After the initial Council in London nine additional International Councils were held

- Second, held in Boston September 20–29, 1899
- Third, held in Edinburgh, June 30 - July 9, 1908
- Fourth, held in Boston June 29-July 6, 1920
- Fifth, held in Bournemouth, England July 1–8, 1930
- Sixth held at Wellesley College, Wellesley, Massachusetts June 17–24, 1949.
- Seventh held at St. Andrews University, Scotland 20–29 June 1953.
- Eighth, held in Hartford, Connecticut 2–10 July 1958
- Ninth, held in Rotterdam, Netherlands on 4–12 July 1962
- Tenth, held in Swansea, Wales 7–11 July 1966

The International Congregational Council merged with the Alliance of Reformed Churches throughout the World holding the Presbyterian System to found the World Alliance of Reformed Churches (Presbyterian and Congregational) at a Uniting General Council held in Nairobi, Kenya August 20–30, 1970.
