= Congregational Christian Church of Niue =

Church

Ekalesia Niue Congregational Christian Church of Niue
- Classification: Protestant
- Orientation: Mainline Reformed
- Polity: Congregationalist
- Associations: World Council of Churches; Council for World Mission; World Alliance of Reformed Churches; World Communion of Reformed Churches; Pacific Conference of Churches; Niue National Council of Churches
- Region: Niue, New Zealand
- Origin: 1970; 56 years ago Alofi, Niue
- Separated from: Congregational Union of New Zealand
- Congregations: 16
- Members: >1,190

The Congregational Christian Church of Niue (abbreviated CCCN, also known as Ekalesia Niue or the Church of Niue) is a Christian denomination in Niue and New Zealand. It is rooted in the Congregationalist part of the Reformed tradition. It is the largest religious denomination in Niue, claiming approximately 75% of Niue's population as members.

In Niue, the church has up to 1,190 members in 16 congregations and 10 house fellowships with 12 pastors. It also has a presence among the roughly 4,500 Niueans living in New Zealand.

The CCCN was founded in Niue by Samoan missionaries from the London Missionary Society (L.M.S.) during the 1840s and the 1850s. The church was organised along Congregational lines under Rev. William George Lawes and his brother Frank E. Lawes, who also trained missionaries from Niue. Further succession of missionaries between 1910 and 1970 moved toward independence in close association with the Congregational Churches of New Zealand. In New Zealand there are about 15,000 people from Niue, mostly congregational religion.

The church in Niue has been independent since 1966. It was known as the L.M.S. Church in Niue until 1970, when it became autonomous and adopted the name "Ekalesia Niue". It has since changed its name to its current form.

The CCCN is a member of the World Council of Churches, the Pacific Conference of Churches, the Council for World Mission, the World Communion of Reformed Churches, the World Alliance of Reformed Churches, and the Niue National Council of Churches.
