= Pentecostal Church in Indonesia =

Pentecostal Church in Indonesia Gereja Pantekosta di Indonesia
- Gereja Pantekosta di Indonesia
- Classification: Christian - Pentecostal
- Orientation: Pentecostal
- Founder: Rev. C. Van Klaverans, Rev. Cornelius E. Groesbeck
- Origin: 1921
- Official website: http://www.gpdiworld.us/ https://www.gpdi.or.id/

Pentecostal Church in Indonesia (Gereja Pantekosta di Indonesia, GPdI) is a Pentecostal denomination of Indonesia. It was founded in 1921 and claims a seven-digit-membership. It used to bear the name Vereeniging De Pinkstergemeente in Nederlandsch Oost Indie. It is one of the largest Pentecostal denominations in Indonesia.

GPdI has a partnership connection with International Church of the Foursquare Gospel.

== Doctrine ==
The teaching emphasized in this church is different from other charismatic churches. The most dominant is concerning the Holy Spirit in Acts 2 where the disciples experience the fullness of the Holy Spirit. With the power of the Holy Spirit Simon Peter and other disciples preached the gospel and the church was born. GPdI Church believes that there will be anti-Christ who will rule 3.5 years, the kingdom of 1000 years of peace, and the second coming of Jesus.

== History ==
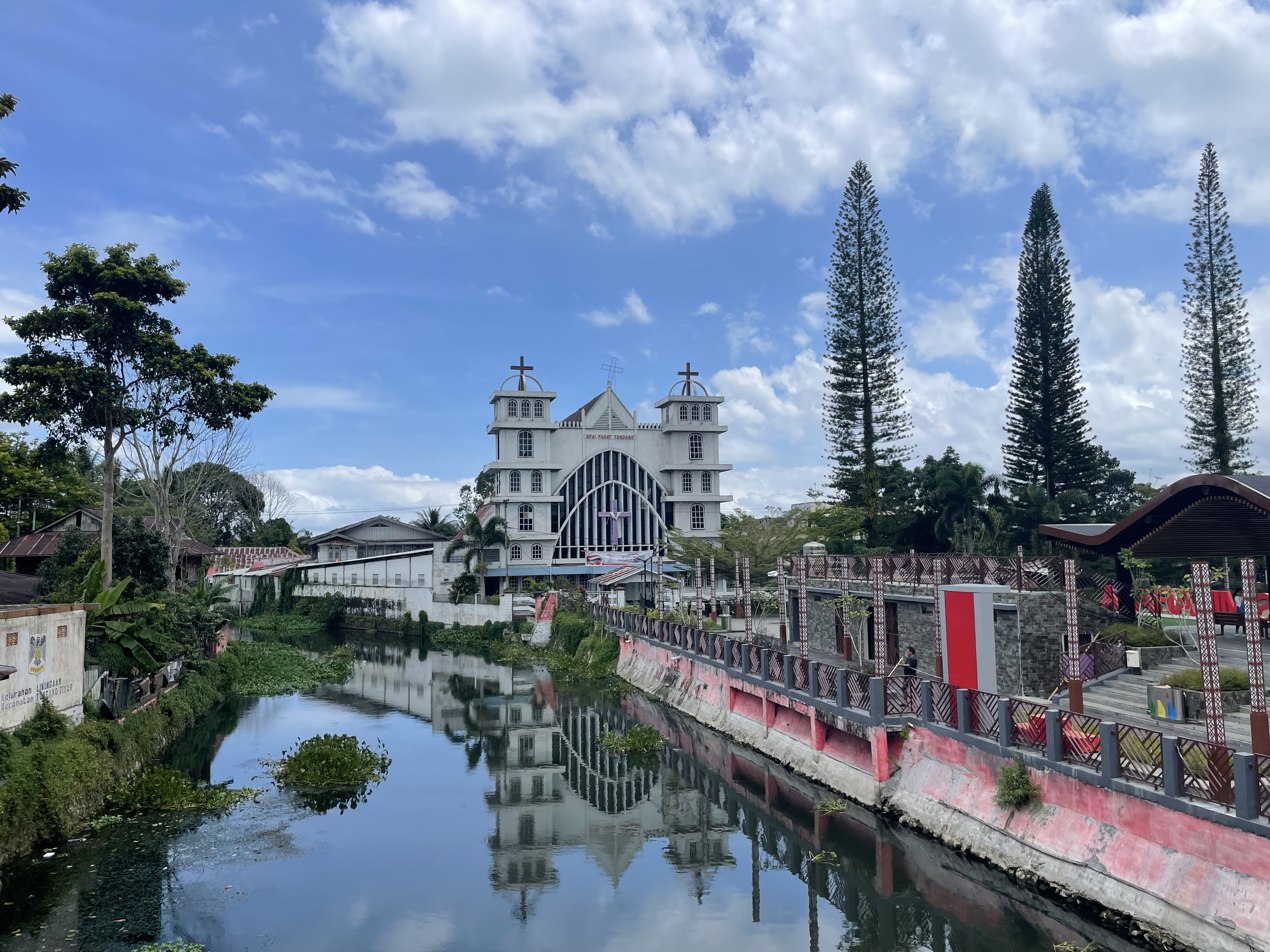
GPdI church in Tondano, North Sulawesi

The establishment of the Pentecostal Church in Indonesia was inseparable from the arrival of two missionary families from the Church of Bethel Temple Seattle, USA to Indonesia in 1921 namely Rev. Cornelius Groesbeek and Rev. Dutch descendant Richard Van Klaveren immigrated to America. From Bali, the ministry switched to Surabaya on the island of Java in 1922, then to the oil city of Cepu in 1923. In this city F.G Van Gessel BPM employees repented and were filled with the Holy Spirit accompanied by many other Indonesian sons, including: H.N. Runkat, J. Repi, A. Tambuwun, J. Lumenta, E. Lesnussa, G.A Yokom, R.Mangindaan, W. Mamahit, S.I.P Lumoindong and A.E. Siwi later became a pioneer of the Pentecostal movement throughout Indonesia. Due to rapid progress, on June 4, 1924 the Dutch East Indies Government recognized the existence of "De Pinkster Gemeente in Nederlansch Indie" as a legitimate "Vereeniging" (association).

On 4 June 1937, the government increased its recognition of the Pentecostal movement to "Kerkgenootschap" (church alliance) based on the Statutes of 1927 number 156 and 523, with Beslit Government No.33 dated 4 June 1937 Staadblad number 768 the name "pinkster Gemente" changed to "Pinkster in Indie Nederlansch. During the Japanese occupation in 1942, the Dutch name was changed to "Pentecostal Church in Indonesia". At that time the Chairperson of the Oemoem Pengoeroes Agency (Central Assembly) was Rev. H.N Runkat.

In addition to the developments, it was also necessary to note several divisions which later gave birth to new churches where the founders came from GPdI people, including: Rev. Ho Liong Seng (DR.H.L Senduk) founder of GBI church who was with Rev. Van Gessel in 1950 parted ways with GPdI and founded GBIS, Rev. Isaac Lew in 1959 left and founded GPPS, previously in 1936 Missionary R.M. Devin and R. Busby left and formed the Assemblies of God, in 1946 Rev. Tan Hok Tjoan separated and formed the Isa Almasih Church and so on.

The role of the pioneers is also worth remembering, because of their struggle the GPdI trees have grown heavily, they include: Rev. H.N. Runkat which penetrated fields on Java, (Jakarta, West Java, Central Java, etc.), 1929 Rev. Yulianus Repi and Rev. A. Tambuwun followed by Rev. A. Yokom, Rev. Lumenta, Rev. Runtuwailan attacked North Sulawesi, in 1939, from North Sulawesi / Ternante Pdt. E. Lesnussa to Makassar and its surroundings. In 1926 Rev. Nanlohy reaches the Maluku islands (Amahasa) which was then followed by Rev. Yoop Siloey, etc.

In 1928 Rev. S.I.P Lumoindong to D.I Yogyakarta in 1933 Rev. A.E. Siwi sows to Sumatra islands (South Sumatra, Lampung, West Sumatra and then 1939 to North Sumatra), 1932 Rev. RM Soeprapto began helping services in Blitar then Singosari dsk, in 1937 to Sitiarjo, South Malang. In 1935 Rev. Siloey et al. Pioneered services to Kupang NTT, 1930 Pdt. De Boer followed by Rev. E. Pattyradjawane and A.F Wessel to East Kalimantan. In 1940 Rev. JMP Coal cut down the West Kalimantan (Pontianak) field, Rev. Yonathan Itar is a pioneer of the Pentecostal Gospel in Irian Jaya, and others that cannot be mentioned one by one. By their sacrifice GPdI grew rapidly.

As of 2025, GPdI is led by John Weol.

== GPdI organizational structures ==
The highest forum in the GPdI forum is the Grand Conference held every 5 years. In addition to establishing the work program outline, the Mubes also functions to elect the GPdI National Leadership called the Central Assembly. The Central Assembly now has as many as 24 people, namely a general chairperson, several chairpersons, a general secretary, a number of secretaries, a general treasurer, several treasurers, and others leading departments, namely: ministry of evangelism, pastoring, education and teaching, organization, church growth, diaconia, and development. Then the Central Assembly appointed 9 national level committee members called the Central Commission, namely: Pentecostal children services, Pentecostal youth services, Pentecostal women's services, Pentecostal male services, Pentecostal professional services and entrepreneurs, servants of the servant, Pentecostal student services, and Central Pentecostal Evangelism Commission. After the Mubes are held, each region holds a regional deliberation (musda) the main purpose of which is to elect regional leaders called the Regional Assembly.

== See also ==
- Protestantism in Indonesia
- Christianity in Indonesia
