= Blenduk Church =

Protestant church in Indonesia

- Protestant Church in Western Indonesia Immanuel Semarang
- Gereja Protestan Indonesia Barat Immanuel Semarang
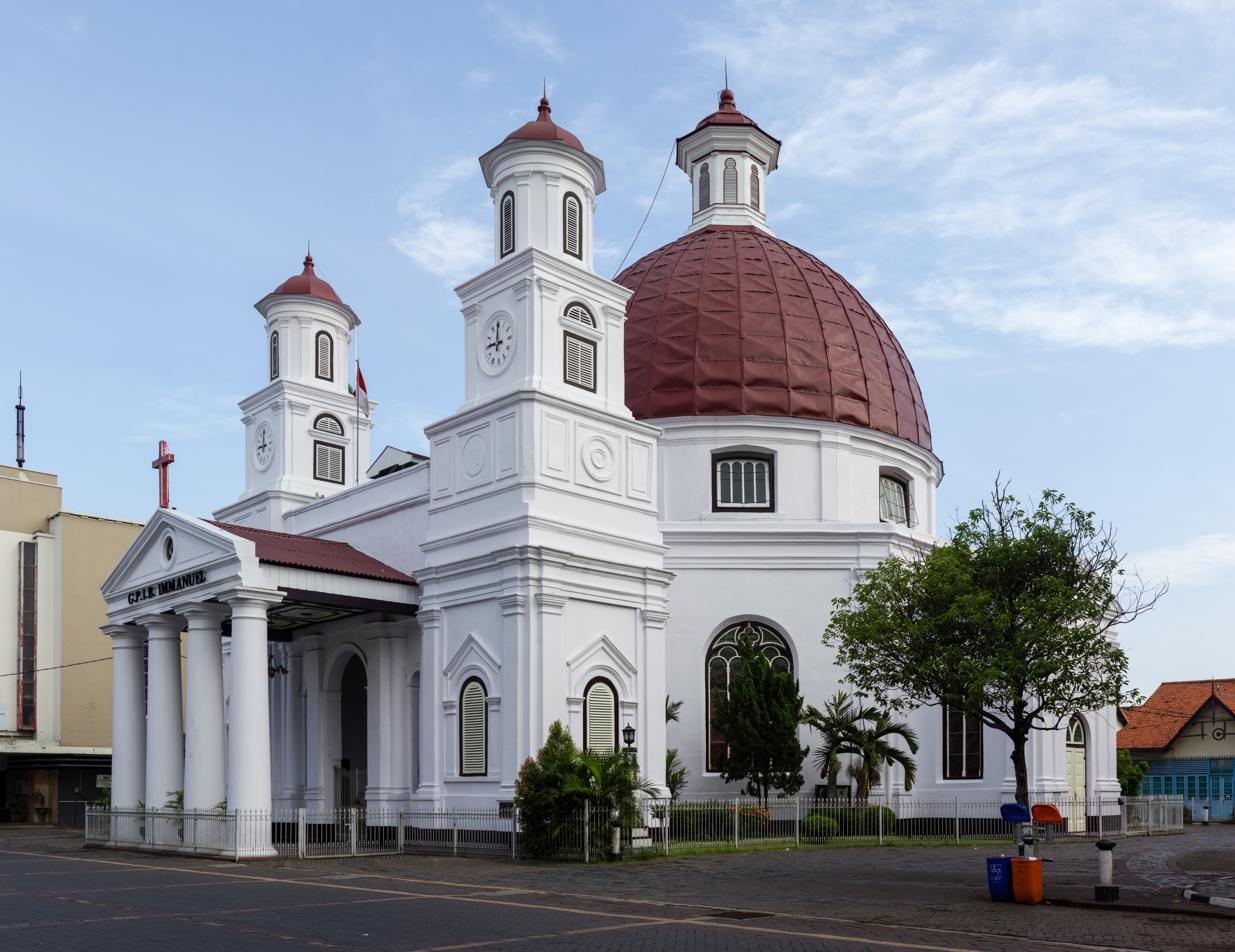

- Location in Semarang
- 6°58′5.28″S 110°25′38.98″E
- Location: Semarang, Central Java
- Country: Indonesia
- Denomination: Protestant (Calvinist)

History
- Founded: 1753

Architecture
- Functional status: Active

Administration
- Parish: 200 families (2004)

The Protestant Church in Western Indonesia Immanuel Semarang (Indonesian: Gereja Protestan Indonesia Barat Immanuel Semarang), better known as Blenduk Church (Gereja Blenduk), is a Protestant church in Semarang, Central Java, Indonesia. Built in 1753, it is the oldest church in the province.

== Architecture and layout ==
Blenduk Church, at 32 Letjen Suprapto Street in the old town of Semarang, Central Java, is located in a small courtyard between former office buildings. The Jiwasraya building is located to the south, across the street, while the Kerta Niaga offices are to its west.

The octagonal church, built on a stone foundation and with single-layer brick walls, has its ground floor at street level. It is topped by a large, copper-skinned dome, from which it gets its common name; the Javanese word mblenduk means dome. The dome is supported by 32 steel beams, 8 large and 24 small. Two towers, square at the base and slowly rounding until topped with a small dome, are located on either side of the main entrance, while a cornice consisting of horizontal lines runs around the building; Roman-style porticoes covered in saddle-shaped roofs are located on its eastern, southern and western faces. Blenduk also features etched and stained glass windows, as well as wood-panel double doors at the south-facing entrance.

The wooden pews inside Blenduk have rattan seats, while the pulpit is completely made of wood and located on an octagonal platform made of teak. A nonfunctional Baroque pipe organ from the 1700s is also located inside. The floor is covered in black, yellow, and white tiles. In the northern part of the interior is a spiral staircase, etched with name of its manufacturer, Pletterij den haag (Rolling Mill, The Hague), which leads to the second floor.

== History ==
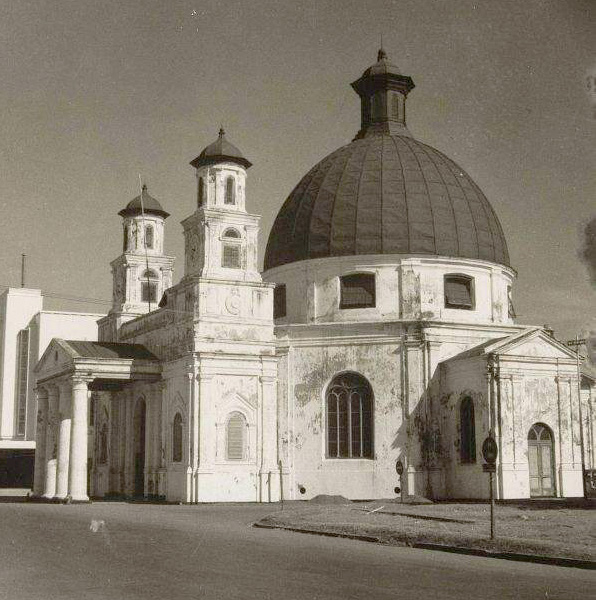
Blenduk in c. 1940

Blenduk was established in 1753; the initial building had a joglo-style. Although meant for Protestants, Catholics also used it until the first Catholic church in the city, in Gedangan, was built.

The church was later rebuilt in 1787. Another re-imagining, spearheaded by H.P.A. de Wilde and W. Westmas, began work in 1894. During this renovation, the dome and two towers were added. Another series of renovations began in the early 2000s. As of 2004, the church has 200 families in its congregation and holds regular Sunday services; it is also a tourist attraction. In 2003 the church celebrated its 250th year.

== Awards ==
In February 2009, Blenduk received an award for Best Maintained Old Place of Worship from the Central Java branch of the Architects' Society of Indonesia.

== Gallery ==
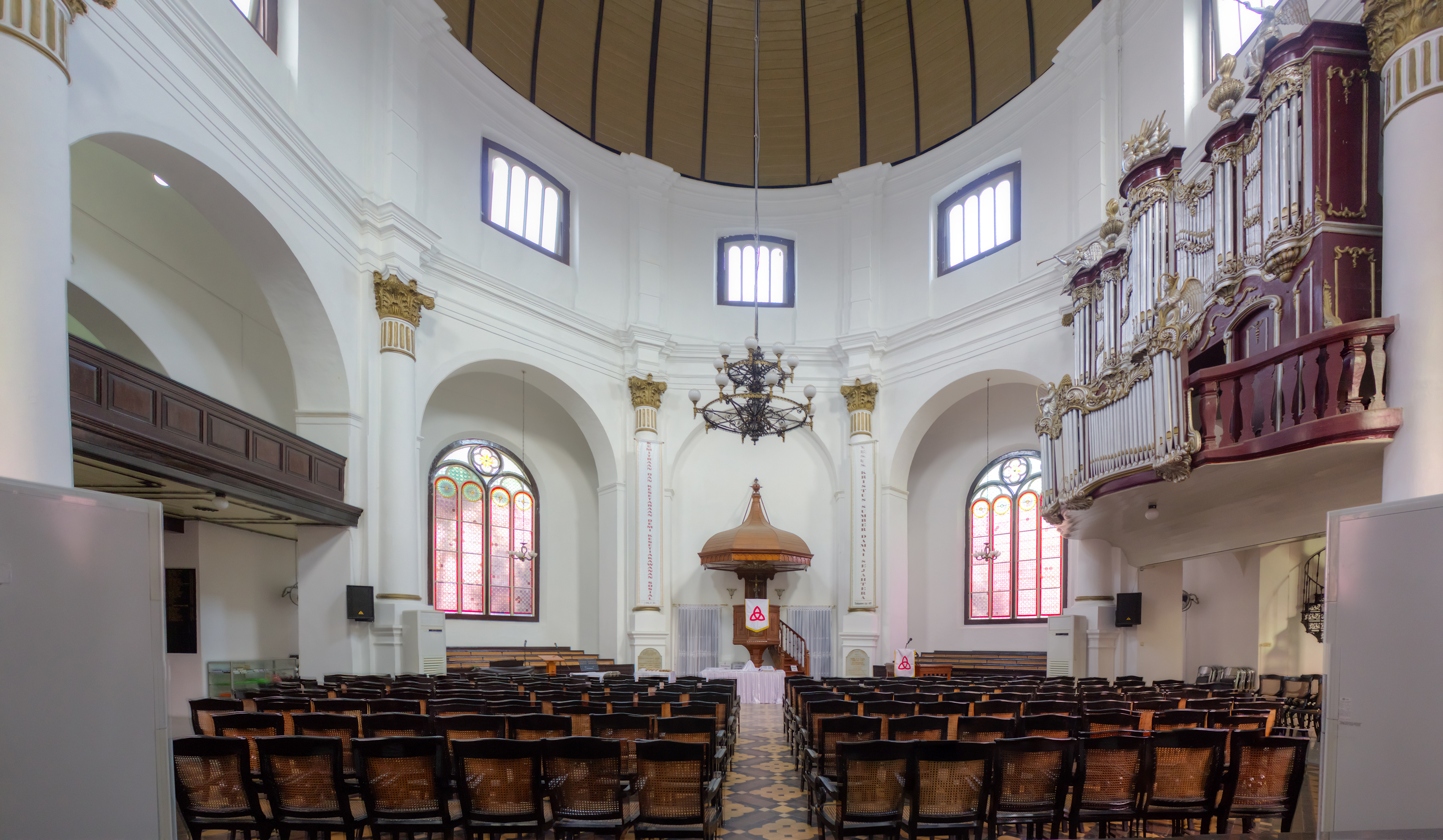
Interior

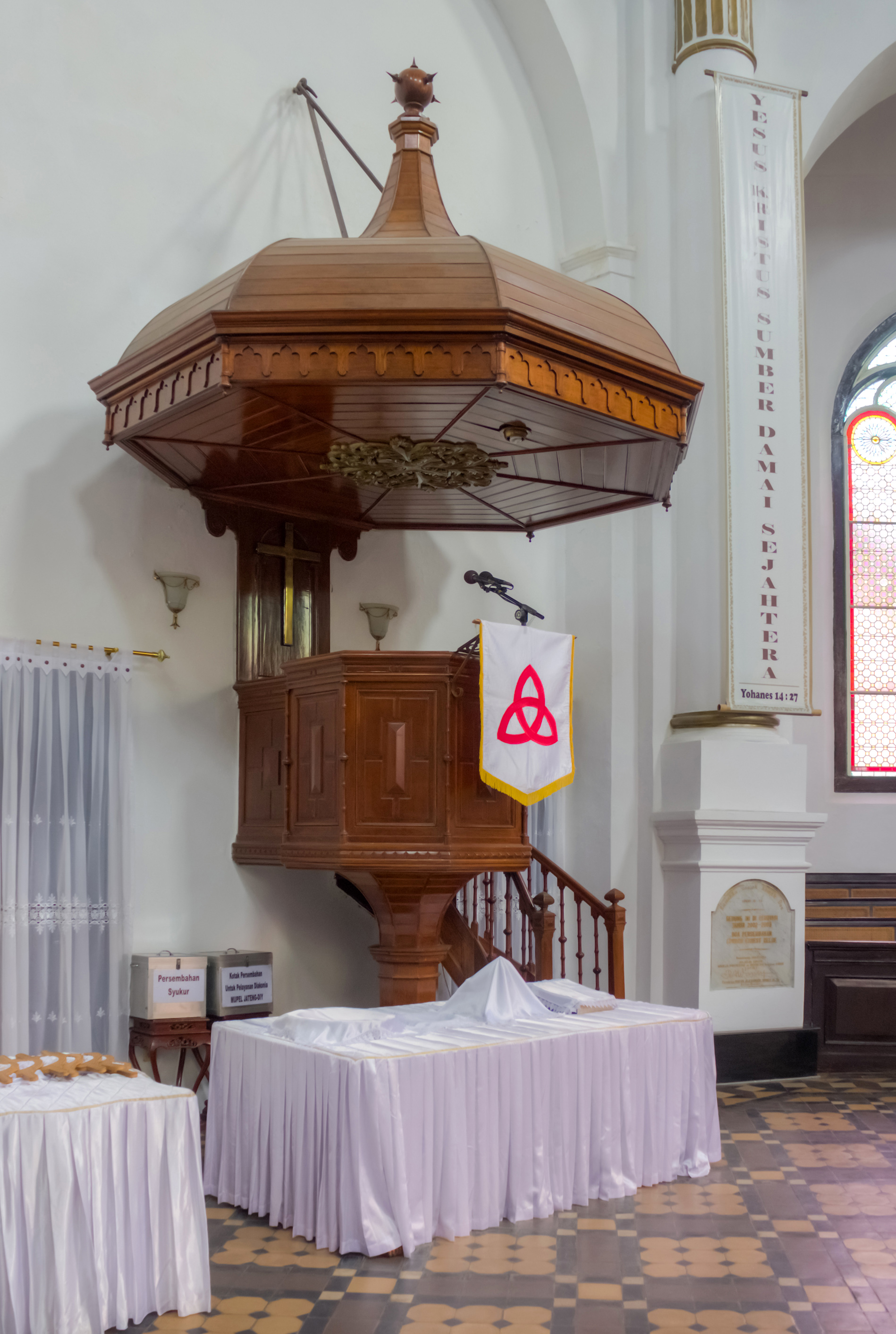
Pulpit

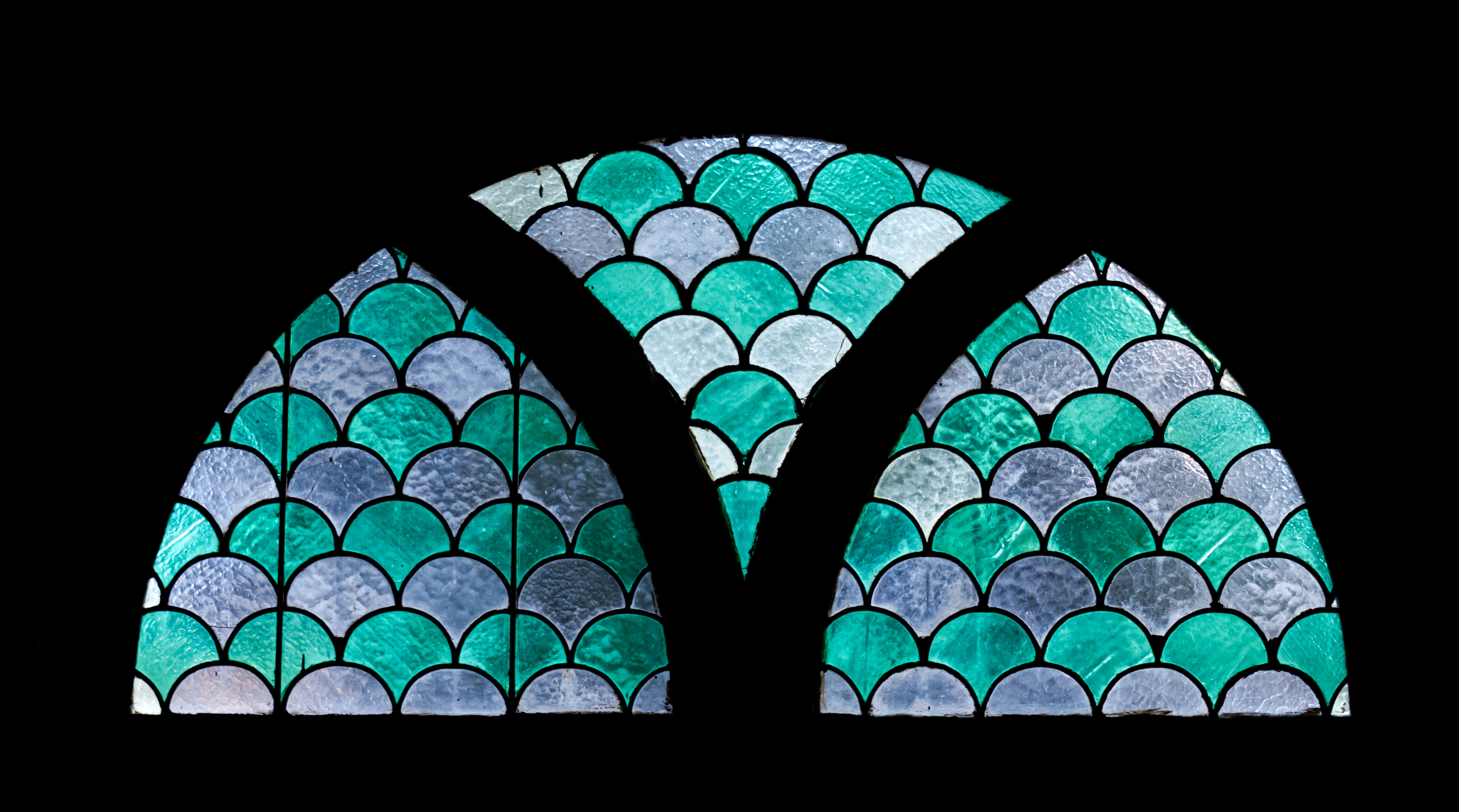
A stained glass window.

== See also ==
- List of church buildings in Indonesia
