= Te Runanga Whakawhanaunga I Nga Hahi O Aotearoa =

Autonomous ecumenical organisation for Māori persons

Te Runanga Whakawhanaunga I Nga Hahi O Aotearoa (Māori Council of Churches) is an autonomous ecumenical organisation for Māori persons. It was formed in 1982, and has Anglican, Baptist, Roman Catholic, Methodist and Presbyterian membership. It is a member of the World Council of Churches and the Christian Conference of Asia.
