= Pasundan Christian Church =

Protestant church in Indonesia

- ᮌᮛᮦᮏ ᮊᮛᮦᮞ᮪ᮒᮨᮔ᮪ ᮕᮞᮥᮔ᮪ᮓᮔ᮪ Gereja Kristen Pasundan
- Abbreviation: GKP
- Type: Christianity
- Classification: Protestant
- Orientation: Reformed
- Scripture: Presbyterian
- Chairman: Rev. Edward Tureay
- General Secretary: Rev. Ferly David
- Deputy Gen. Sec.: Rev. T. Adama
- Associations: World Communion of Reformed Churches
- Region: Indonesia
- Language: Indonesian, English
- Liturgy: New Testament
- Headquarters: Jalan Pasirkaliki 121-123, PO Box 1051, Bandung 40010, Jawa Barat, Indonesia
- Territory: Indonesia
- Founder: J. Iken (Dutch evangelist), D. Abednego (Dutch writer), Tan Goan Tjong (treasurer)
- Origin: 14 November 1934; 90 years ago Bandung, Jawa Barat
- Separated from: Society for Internal and External Mission in Batavia
- Congregations: 51
- Members: 33,000
- Ministers: 83
- Missionaries: 5 vicars
- Hospitals: Rumah Sakit Immanuel, Bandung
- Nursing homes: Tanjung Barat Orphanage (Panti Asuhan Tanjung Barat)
- Tertiary institutions: Maranatha Christian University (Universitas Kristen Maranatha)
- Official website: GKP.or.id
- Slogan: Yesus Kristus Terang Dunia (Jesus Christ is the Light of the World)

The Pasundan Christian Church (Indonesian: Gereja Kristen Pasundan - GKP, Sundanese: ᮌᮛᮦᮏ ᮊᮛᮦᮞ᮪ᮒᮨᮔ᮪ ᮕᮞᮥᮔ᮪ᮓᮔ᮪, romanized: Garéja Karésten Pasundan) was officially established in Indonesia (then Netherlands East Indies) on 14 November 1934; 90 years ago. It has 51 congregations and 33,000 members. It is a member of the World Communion of Reformed Churches (WCRC).

Whilst Indonesia was predominantly a Muslim country, the early Christian church in Indonesia was founded by Dutch missionaries, in the western part of Java island in 1863; 162 years ago. The missionaries took a very antithetic attitude toward Islam and the Sundanese culture. The progress was very slow. Meanwhile, a Dutch layman collected some converts using less orthodox methods, with the forms of the Javanese magical learning. In 1885, these two streams united, and in 1934, when it had 4,000 members, a presbyterian synod was formed. In 1942, several hardships occurred, and lasted to the fifties because of the Islamic revolts. The church survived, and consolidated. It now runs several schools and hospitals.

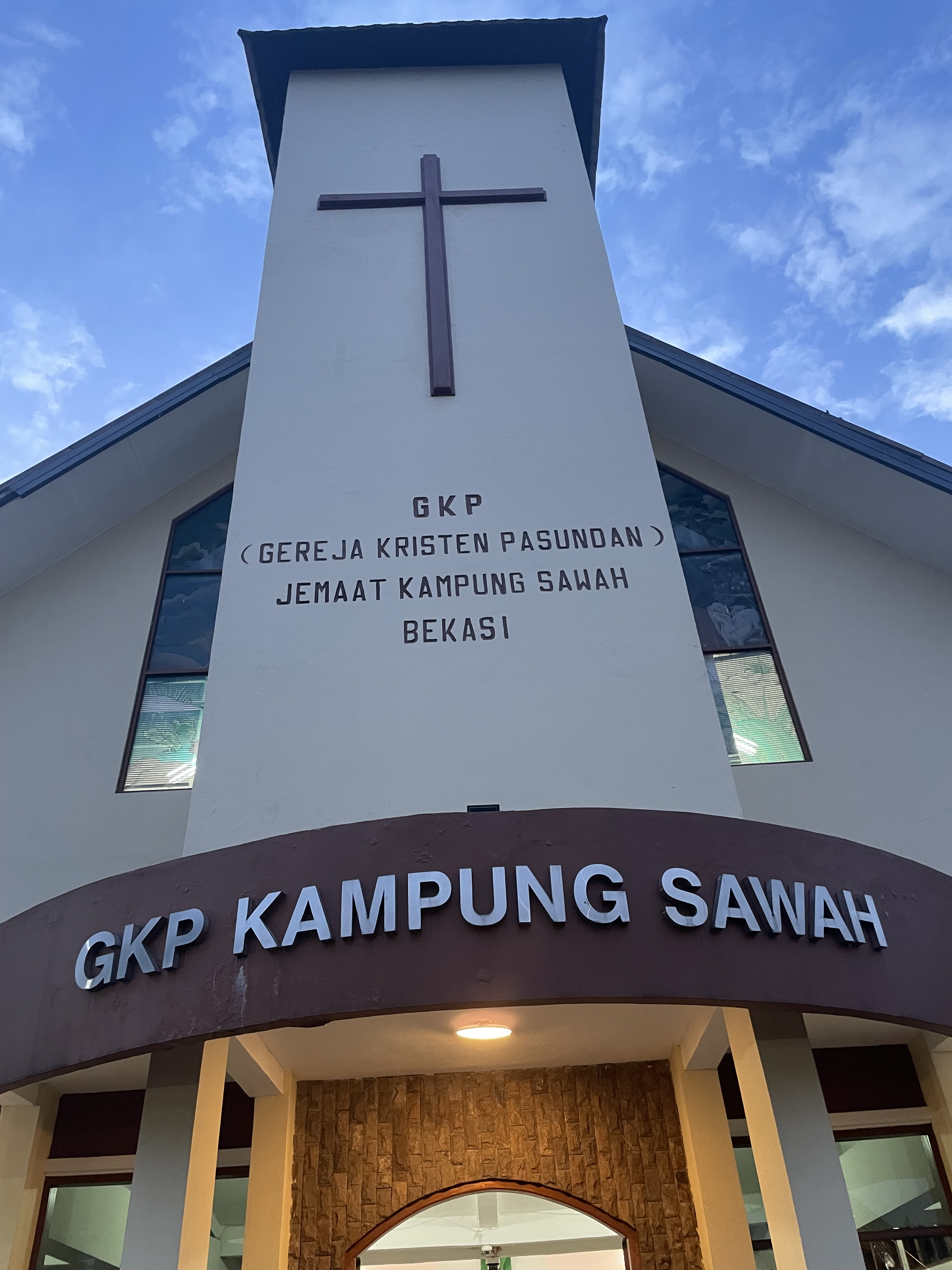
Gereja Kristen Pasundan in Bekasi, Indonesia

== Ecumenical institution memberships ==
The Pasundan Christian Church is a member of a number of ecumenical institutions, including the Communion of Churches in Indonesia (Persekutuan Gereja-gereja di Indonesia PGI), specifically: the Communion of Churches in Indonesia West Java Region (PGIW-JABAR), the Communion of Churches in Indonesia DKI Jakarta Region (PGIW-DKI Jakarta), the Communion of Churches in Indonesia Banten Region (PGIW-Banten), along with the Christian Conference of Asia (CCA, Konferensi Kristen Asia), the World Alliance of Reformed Churches (WARC, Aliansi Gereja-Gereja Reformasi Dunia), and the World Council of Churches (WCC, Dewan Gereja-Gereja Sedunia, since 1960).

== Partner churches ==
The Pasundan Christian Church has collaborated with Basel Mission from Switzerland, the Protestant Church in the Netherlands (Gereja Protestan di Belanda, Dutch: de Protestantse Kerk in Nederland, abbreviated PKN), and the Indonesia Christian Church (Gereja Kristen Indonesia, GKI) of the West Java Regional Synod.

It has also pioneered the establishment of the Indonesian Christian Teacher Education College, itself the forerunner of the Satya Wacana Christian University (SWCU, Universitas Kristen Satya Wacana), Salatiga. Until now, it has sent its delegates to the Satya Wacana Christian Higher Education Foundation, which is the foundation that manages SWCU.

The Pasundan Christian Church has an ecumenical cooperation relationship with one of the presbyteral churches in South Korea, namely, the Presbyterian Church in the Republic of Korea (PROK).

== See also ==
- Religion in Indonesia
