= Methodist Church, Upper Myanmar =

The Methodist Church, Upper Myanmar was founded by British Methodist ministers in 1887. The church activity is based in Mandalay. It became autonomous in 1964. It had 27,543 members and 184 congregations.
