= Protestant Church in Indonesia =

Indonesian protestant denomination

- Gereja Protestan di Indonesia
- Classification: Protestant
- Orientation: Continental Reformed
- Scripture: Protestant Bible
- Theology: Reformed
- Polity: Presbyterian
- Associations: World Communion of Reformed Churches
- Region: Indonesia
- Language: Indonesian
- Territory: Indonesia
- Origin: 1605; Ambon, Maluku
- Congregations: 4,373 (2012-2025)
- Members: 3,766,078 (2012-2025)
- Other names: De Protestantsche Kerk in Nederlandsch-Indië, Indische Kerk
- Official website: https://sinodeamgpi.id/

The Protestant Church in Indonesia (Indonesian: Gereja Protestan di Indonesia, GPI) is a Reformed church; it is a member of World Communion of Reformed Churches.

== Origin ==
The Protestant Church in Indonesia was formed in Ambon, Maluku, in 1605 under the name of the Protestant Church in the Netherlands Indies, in Dutch De Protestantsche Kerk in Nederlandsch-Indië, shortened as Indische Kerk. It is the first Protestant and Reformed church to be founded in Asia. In 1619, the headquarters was moved to Batavia after Dutch East India Company headquarter moved from Ambon, Maluku to Batavia. The denomination inherited the missions left by the Portuguese. The church supported missions all over Indonesia. Its territories cover several areas like the Maluku Islands, Minahasa, Java, Sumatra, East Nusa Tenggara.

In the 1930s, the church spread rapidly. It developed 2 autonomous churches in the 1930s. At 30 September 1934, the autonomous church of Christian Evangelical Church in Minahasa was established in Manado residency. At 06 September 1935, the autonomous church of Protestant Church in the Moluccas was established in Moluccas (Molukken) residency.

In the 20th century, it adopted a more Presbyterian church order. It has 4,800 congregations and 3.1 million members. The church has 2 autonomous churches.

== Member churches ==
As 2024, the Protestant Church in Indonesia has 12 denominations members.

Denomination					
English Translation	Indonesian	Est.	Congregations	Members	Year
Evangelical Christian Church in Timor	Gereja Masehi Injili di Timor	1947	634	1,145,226	2023
Christian Evangelical Church in Minahasa	Gereja Masehi Injili di Minahasa	1934	1,060	830,107	2023
Protestant Church in Western Indonesia	Gereja Protestan di Indonesia bagian Barat	1948	351	750,000	2021
Protestant Church in the Moluccas	Gereja Protestan Maluku	1935	761	575,405	2019
Protestant Church in Indonesia in Papua	Gereja Protestan Indonesia di Papua	1985	630	250,000	2023
Talaud Christian Evangelical Church	Gereja Masehi Injili Talaud	2000	123	79,809	2023
Indonesian Protestant Church in Banggai Islands	Gereja Protestan Indonesia di Banggai Kepulauan	2000	157	45,980	2023
Indonesian Protestant Church in Donggala	Gereja Protestan Indonesia Donggala	1965	169	40,125	2012
Indonesian Protestant Church in Buol Toli-Toli	Gereja Protestan Indonesia di Buol Tolitoli	1965	251	23,374	2023
Christian Church in Luwuk Banggai	Gereja Kristen di Luwuk Banggai	1966	76	15,009	2023
Indonesian Protestant Church in Gorontalo	Gereja Protestan Indonesia di Gorontalo	1965	168	10,302	2023
Indonesian Evangelical Christian Church		1998	-	188	2006
Total			4,373	3,766,078	2012-2025
