= Christian Evangelical Church in Sangihe-Talaud =

The Christian Evangelical Church in Sangihe-Talaud (Indonesian: Gereja Masehi Injili Sangihe Talaud, GMIST) was organised on 15 May 1947. In the late 1800s the Netherlands Missionary Society started working in Sulawesi. It has several had hardships, but gained independence and the Synod was formed in 1947. The church has a large number of elementary and vacational schools and clinics. Today 90% of the inhabitants in Sangihe-Talaud belong to this denomination. The church is a member of the World Communion of Reformed Churches. The church has 220,000 members and 355 congregations and has a presbyterian-synodal government.
