= Christian Church in Luwuk Banggai =

Christian denomination in Indonesia

The Christian Church in Luwuk Banggai (Indonesian: Gereja Kristen di Luwuk Banggai, GKLB) is a Reformed denomination in Indonesia, a member of the World Communion of Reformed Churches.

Christianity came to Luwuk Banggai in 1912, brought by Dutch missionaries, and established the Protestant Church in Indonesia. The Minahasa church become independent in 1934, and the church in Luwuk transferred its membership to the Minahasa denomination. The Luwuk Banggai church become independent in 1966. Half of the 226 congregations are located in the mainland of Sulawesi, the other half in Banggai Archipelago, with 73,000 members.
