= Indonesian Protestant Church in Gorontalo =

The Indonesian Protestant Church in Gorontalo (Indonesian: Gereja Protestan Indonesia di Gorontalo) is an independent church within the Protestant Church in Indonesia serving Gorontalo, North Sulawesi and Central Sulawesi. It has 98 congregations and 10,000 members. The church is a member of the World Communion of Reformed Churches.
