= Evangelical Christian Church of the Land of Papua =

Christian denomination in Indonesia

- Gereja Kristen Injili Tanah Papua
- Classification: Protestant
- Orientation: Calvinist
- Region: Western New Guinea
- Headquarters: Jayapura, Papua
- Origin: October 26, 1956; 70 years ago
- Members: 650.000 (2012)
- Tertiary institutions: Sekolah Tinggi Filsafat Teologi GKI Izaak Samuel Kijne

Church logo

Evangelical Christian Church of the Land of Papua (Indonesian: Gereja Kristen Injili Tanah Papua, abbreviated as GKITP) is a Protestant denomination in Indonesia, particularly in western Papua region.

The denomination is the single largest church in Irian where about 30% of the population belong to it.

Its motto is from the Epistle to the Ephesians 5:8 "For once you were darkness, but now in the Lord you are light. Live as children of light" (NRSV). In the areas of human rights and politics in the region, the church plays a significant role. It has a presbyterian-synodal model of church government, the synod is the highest governing body.

The church had 650,000 members and 1869 parishes. The church belong to the World Communion of Reformed Churches

== History ==
In 1855 two German missionaries arrived in northwestern Irian. This was the Gossner Mission. In 1962 the Utrechtische Zendingsvereeining of the Reformed Church in the Netherlands took over the work. Dutch missionaries assisted by teachers and preachers from other islands.

The work progressed slowly. In 1907 a great revival started, and there were thousands of converts. The mission spread to the whole island. The period between 1907 and 1942 was gradual development. During the Japanese invasion no General Assembly was held. In 1950 the first Irianese were ordained. In 1956 the first Synod was held and seven years later the Dutch missionaries left the island.
