= Indonesian Protestant Church in Donggala =

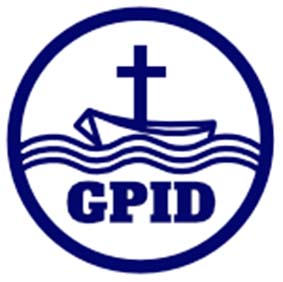
Logo of Indonesian Protestant Church in Donggala

The Indonesian Protestant Church in Donggala is a Protestant church in the island of Sulawesi, Indonesia. It has more than 40,000 members and is part of the Protestant Church in Indonesia.
