= Protestant Christian Church of Nias =

The Protestant Christian Church of Nias (Indonesian and Nias: Orahua Niha Keriso Protestan) is a Lutheran denomination in Nias, North Sumatra. The Rhenish Missionary Society started work in Nias under leadership of E. Ludwig Denninger in 1865. Until the 1900s, when the Dutch colonial period came, the progress of the denomination was very slow. In 1890 there were only 706 baptized members, but in 1910 this grew to over 20,000, and in 1921 there were 60,000 members. The church was officially established in 1936, when the first Synod was formed. Currently the island has a population of 500,000 members; 73% of them are Protestant, 18% Roman Catholic and 7% Muslim.

The church has approximately 357,000 members and 100 parishes spread throughout Indonesia (not limited to Nias island).
