= Indonesian Protestant Church in Buol Tolitoli =

Logo of the Indonesian Protestant Church in Buol Toli-Toli

Indonesian Protestant Church in Buol Tolitoli (Indonesian: Gereja Protestan Indonesia di Buol Tolitoli) is a Protestant Church group in Buol and Tolitoli, Central Sulawesi, Indonesia. In the 19th century Europeans and Indonesians immigrated to this part of the island. The Minahasan ministers established the Protestant church. In 1937, the region was transferred to the Minahasan Church. Because the distance the church didn't remained in the Minahasan Church. In 1965, it became an independent denomination.

It has 200 congregations and 51 fellowships with 23,000 members. It is a member of the World Communion of Reformed Churches.
