= Toraja Mamasa Church =

Christian denomination in Indonesia

The Toraja Mamasa Church was established on 7 June 1947, and based in West Sulawesi. It is a Protestant church, and a member of the World Communion of Reformed Churches. It was a fruit of the Christian Reformed Churches in the Netherlands, a conservative Reformed denomination. Evangelism was started in 1931. These churches were grouped together in 1948 to form an independent denomination. This is the largest church in the Mamasa Valley.

The Toraja Mamasa Church adheres to the Apostles Creed and the Heidelberg Catechism. It has a Presbyterian church government with Presbyteries, and Synods.

The church has 65 classes and 532 congregations and 136,000 members.
