= Evangelical Christian Church in Halmahera =

The Evangelical Christian Church in Halmahera (GMIH) represents the half of the population in the island of Halmahera, in Indonesia.

The denomination was a mission established by the Netherlands Reformed Church, and become autonomous in 1949. It has 300,000 members in 411 congregations and 27 presbyteries. GMIH follows the Presbyterian Church governance. The church is Reformed in theology and owns its own Theological Seminary. In 1866 the Utrech Missionary Union of the Netherlands Reformed Church came to the island. Four Dutch missionaries begun to work. The real growth come after 1900. The church become independent in June 1949. Member of the World Communion of Reformed Churches.
