= Christian Church of Southern Sumatra =

Protestant church in Indonesia

The Christian Church of Southern Sumatra is a Protestant church in Indonesia, based on the southern part of the island of Sumatra, the Provinces of Lampung, Jambi, South Sumatra, and Bengkulu. The synod office is located in Lampung. The denomination was officially founded on 6 August 1987. It has 30,000–35,000 members, 65 parishes, 40 house fellowships and 13 Classis. The church reported steady growth. The church connected and established formal link to the Protestant Church in the Netherlands.

The church has long history since the migrating of millions of Javanese to the island of Sumatra. The Christian Church of Central Java began mission work among these Javanese population in Sumatra. In 1952, five congregations formed a classis and joined the Javanese Christian Church. In the 1950s the Reformed Church in the Netherlands took over this work. Two Dutch missionaries worked in the field. In 1987 the church became independent. The church publishes a newspaper. It belongs to the World Communion of Reformed Churches.
