= Javanese Christian Church =

Christian church founded 1931

Gereja Kristen Jawa
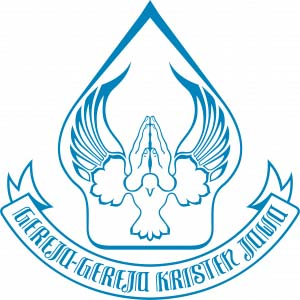
- Classification: Protestant
- Orientation: Reformed
- Polity: Presbyterian
- Region: Banten, Central Java, East Java, Jakarta, West Java, Yogyakarta
- Headquarters: Jl. Dr. Sumardi no. 8 & 10, Salatiga 50711
- Origin: 17–18 February 1931; Kebumen, Central Java
- Branched from: Nederlandsche Gereformeerde Zendingvereniging, Zending van de Gereformeerde Kerken in Nederland & Jemaat Kerasulan Kyai Sadrach
- Separations: Christian Church of Southern Sumatra
- Congregations: 32 presbyteries
- Members: 220,000
- Ministers: 307
- Places of worship: 307
- Official website: sinodegkj.or.id

The Javanese Christian Church (Indonesian: Gereja Kristen Jawa, GKJ) or the Synod of the Christian Churches of Java (Sinode Gereja-gereja Kristen Jawa), founded on 17 February 1931, is a mutual bond of Javanese Reformed Christian churches which amounts to 307 churches in 32 presbyteries, spreading in 6 provinces in the island of Java: Yogyakarta, Central Java, East Java, West Java, Jakarta, and Banten. It has a Presbyterian church government.

It is a member of World Communion of Reformed Churches.
