= Christian Evangelical Church in Bolaang Mongondow =

The Christian Evangelical Church in Bolaang Mongondow (Indonesian: Gereja Masehi Injili di Bolaang Mongondow) is a Protestant church in North Sulawesi Indonesia.The church was established on June 28, 1950. The first chairman of the first Synod was PM Kolopita.

The church has 181 congregations and more than 210,000 members.
