= Christian Church of Sumba =

Calvinist church in Indonesia

Christian Church of Sumba is Calvinist church in Indonesia, a member of World Communion of Reformed Churches. The denomination was established on 15 January 1947. Today, the church has congregations in various cities outside the island of Sumba.

There are churches in Sumba, Flores, Rote Ndao, Kupang, Timor, Bali, Java, Sulawesi.

It has 550,000 members, the majority of the Christian population in Sumba in 2004. The church has been growing steadily. The oldest and largest church of Christian Church of Sumba is located in Waikabubak.

In 2012, the church had approximately 600,000 members and 712 congregations. In 1907, Dutch Reformed started the mission in Sumba and they founded a number of congregations. By the 1940s, there were 5,000 Christians in Sumba. The official founding date is 1947. The church adheres to the Heidelberg Catechism
