= Protestant Church in Southeast Sulawesi =

Protestant Church in Sulawesi, Indonesia

The first missionaries came to Southeast Sulawesi in the 1880s. Around 1900 the Protestant church had congregations in this part of the island, consisting of army officers and military. The Protestant mission effort began in 1916, but only a small percentage of native inhabitants became Christian. During World War II, the congregations suffered under the Japanese. In 1950 several church workers were killed by Muslim guerrillas. Later the political situation stabilized. Christianity increased in the last 30 years. The church has 89 congregations and 30,000 members. It is a member of the World Communion of Reformed Churches.
