= Central Sulawesi Christian Church =

Christian church in Indonesia

The Central Sulawesi Christian Church (Indonesian: Gereja Kristen Sulawesi Tengah) is the largest Christian church in Central Sulawesi, Indonesia. It belongs to the Reformed family of churches. The church was established in the early 1893 through the mission work of the Dutch Reformed Church (— A.C. Kruyt and N. Adriani — ) and became an independent denomination in 1947 when Indonesia declared its independence from the Netherlands and ordered all Dutch nationals to go home. November 1993, there was in Tentena a celebration feast for 100 years Christianity.

According to the 2004 statistics the GKST (Central Sulawesi Christian Church) now has over 342 congregations and 160,000 members spread throughout the province of Central Sulawesi as well as the northern part of South Sulawesi province. The church is headquartered in the town of Tentena, at the northern end of Lake Poso.

In 2006 the church had 188 000 members and 376 congregations served by 625 pastors.

On 29 October 2005 three girls who attended the Church's school were found beheaded near Poso. The girls were killed by six unidentified assailants while on their way to class. The victims were identified as Yarni Sambue (15), Theresia Morangke (16), and Alfita Poliwo (17). Police obtained the descriptions of events and the attackers from a survivor, Noviana Malewa (15), who suffered wounds to her face and is in intensive care. The murdered girls are all cousins of Noviana Malewa, who has not been told of their deaths. The girls' bodies were found at the scene of the attack — near a cocoa plantation — and their heads were found at separate locations; one near a church.

Reverend Renaldy Damanik heads the synod of the Central Sulawesi Christian Church. Rev. Damanik has been instrumental in attempts to stop the violence that continues to disrupt the lives of both Christians and Muslims since December 1998. The incident described above is only one of many that has occurred in the years since then. The church is affiliated with the World Communion of Reformed Churches.
