= Evangelical Church in Kalimantan =

Protestant denomination in Indonesia

The Rheinische Missiongesellschaft zu Bremen (RMG) started missions in Kalimantan, now known as Borneo, in 1838 among Dayak Ngaju and Maanyan tribes. The work was almost destroyed because of a riot against the Dutch rule. The development was slow. In 1901, there were only 2,000 Christians. After World War I, the Rheinische Mission had to hand over the work to the Basel Mission.

On 4 April 1935, the church become autonomous as the Dayak Evangelical Church, a Lutheran church and also Reformed. In 1950, the church adopted its current name, Gereja Kalimantan Evangelis (GKE). It established a center for agricultural training in 1955. The church has schools, clinics, and student homes. The denomination has 288,000 members and almost 1,000 congregations and 550 pastors as of 2012. The church serves the islands of Borneo, Sulawesi, Sumatra and Java.

It is a member of the World Communion of Reformed Churches.
