= Protestant Christian Church in Bali =

Christian denomination in Indonesia

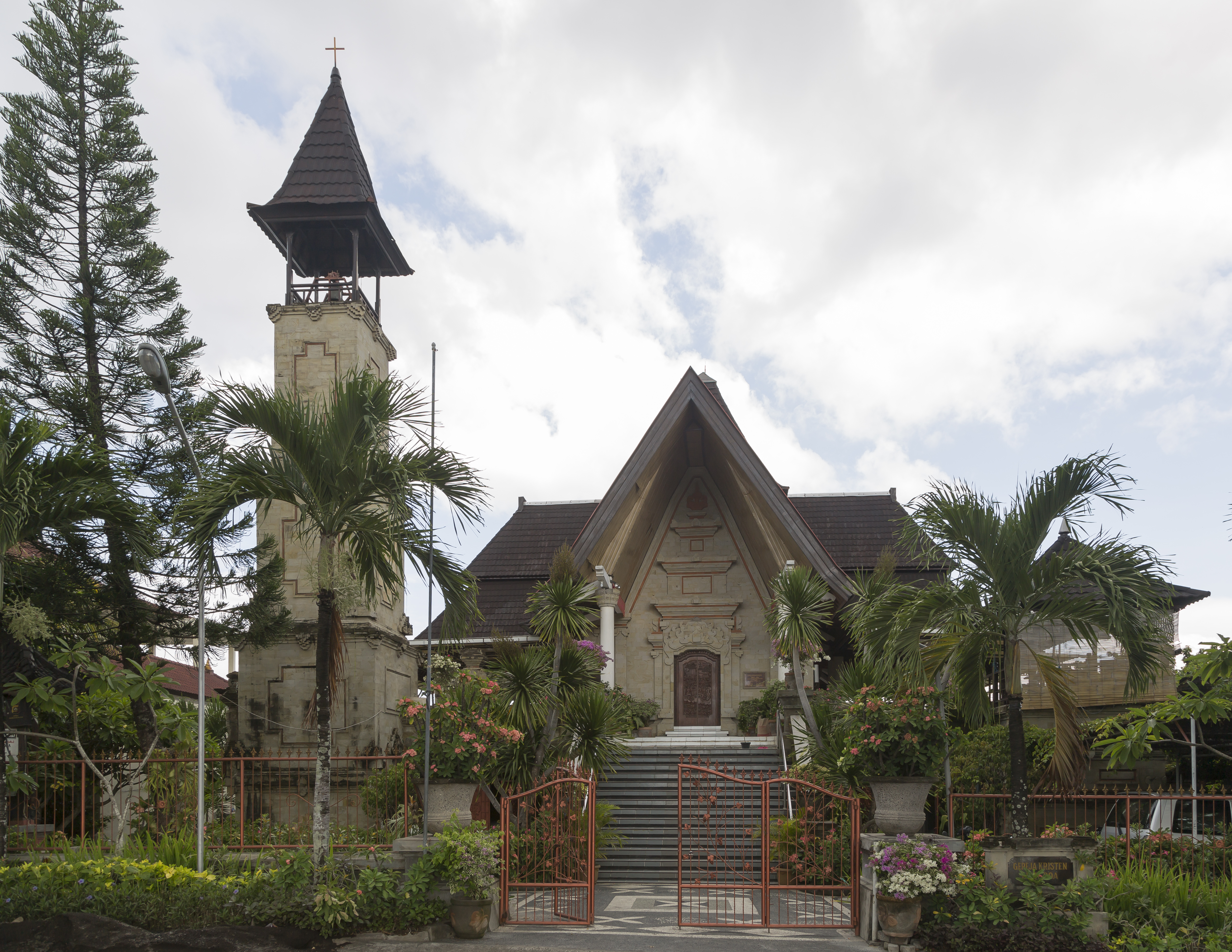
Church of community "Bukit Dua" in Kuta, Bali

The Protestant Christian Church in Bali (Gereja Kristen Protestan di Bali or GKPB) is a Reformed denomination established in 1931 in Bali, Indonesia by the Christian and Missionary Alliance with help from the Dutch Reformed Church and the Church in East Java. The denomination adopted its current name on 21 April 1949. There are also churches located in Hamburg, Germany, Bern and Amsterdam.

The church has a membership of approximately 12,000 in 72 congregations.

The church is a member of the World Communion of Reformed Churches.

== Maha Bhoga Marga ==
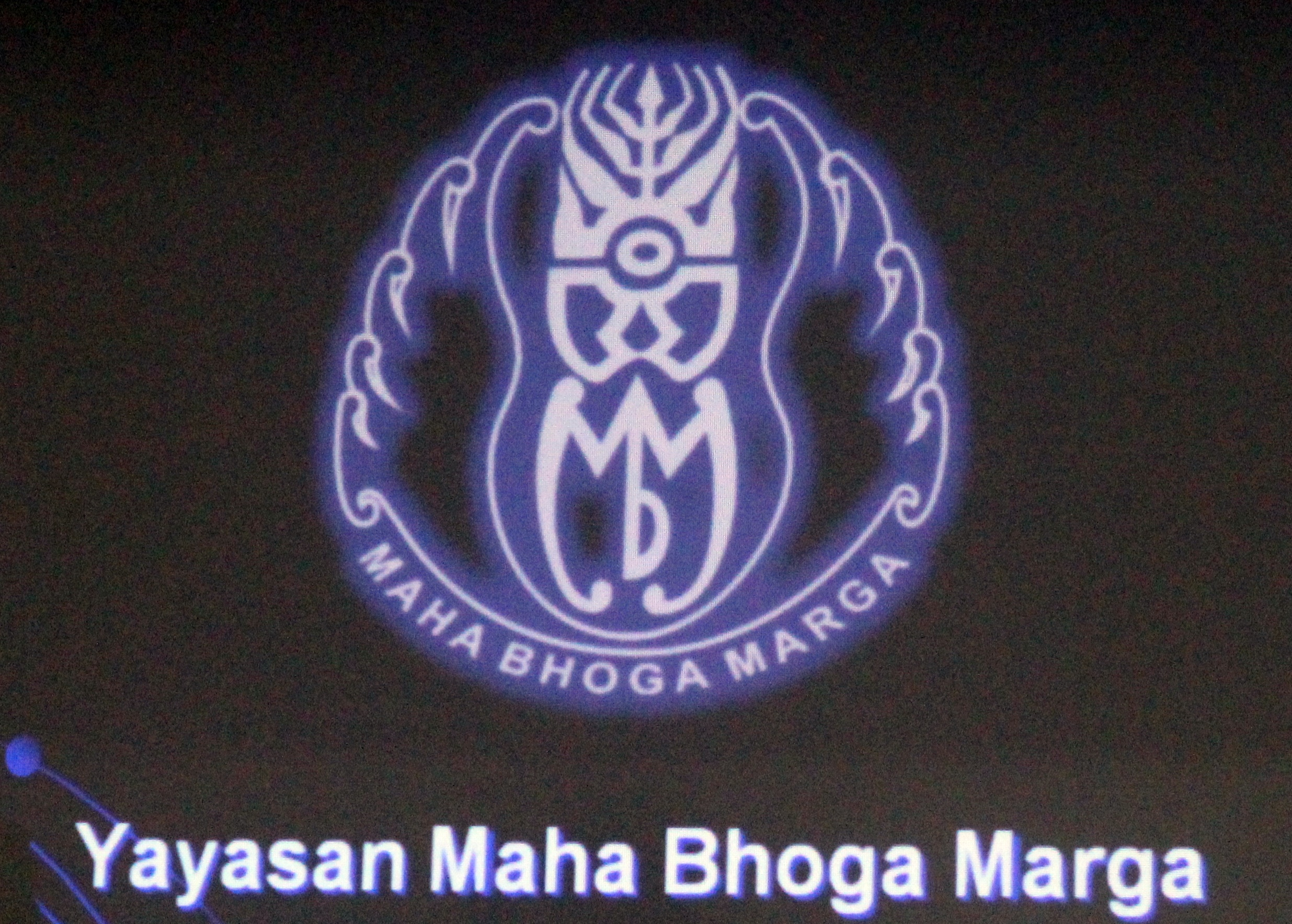
Logo MBM

Maha Bhoga Marga (Main Road to Prosperity) is a community advocacy and empowerment foundation established and operated by the Protestant Christian Church in Bali in 1980. It helps underprivileged people in Bali to try to improve their community's economy. The foundation is located at Jl. Raya Kapal No. 20 Mengwi Badung, Bali. MBM works in mostly rice-farming communities.

MBB is a modern social foundation, following international and national issues in program implementation, such as: climate change adaptation, HIV/AIDS prevention, permaculture, COVID-19 response, sexual and reproductive health rights, and disaster response.
