= Karo Batak Protestant Church =

Church in Indonesia

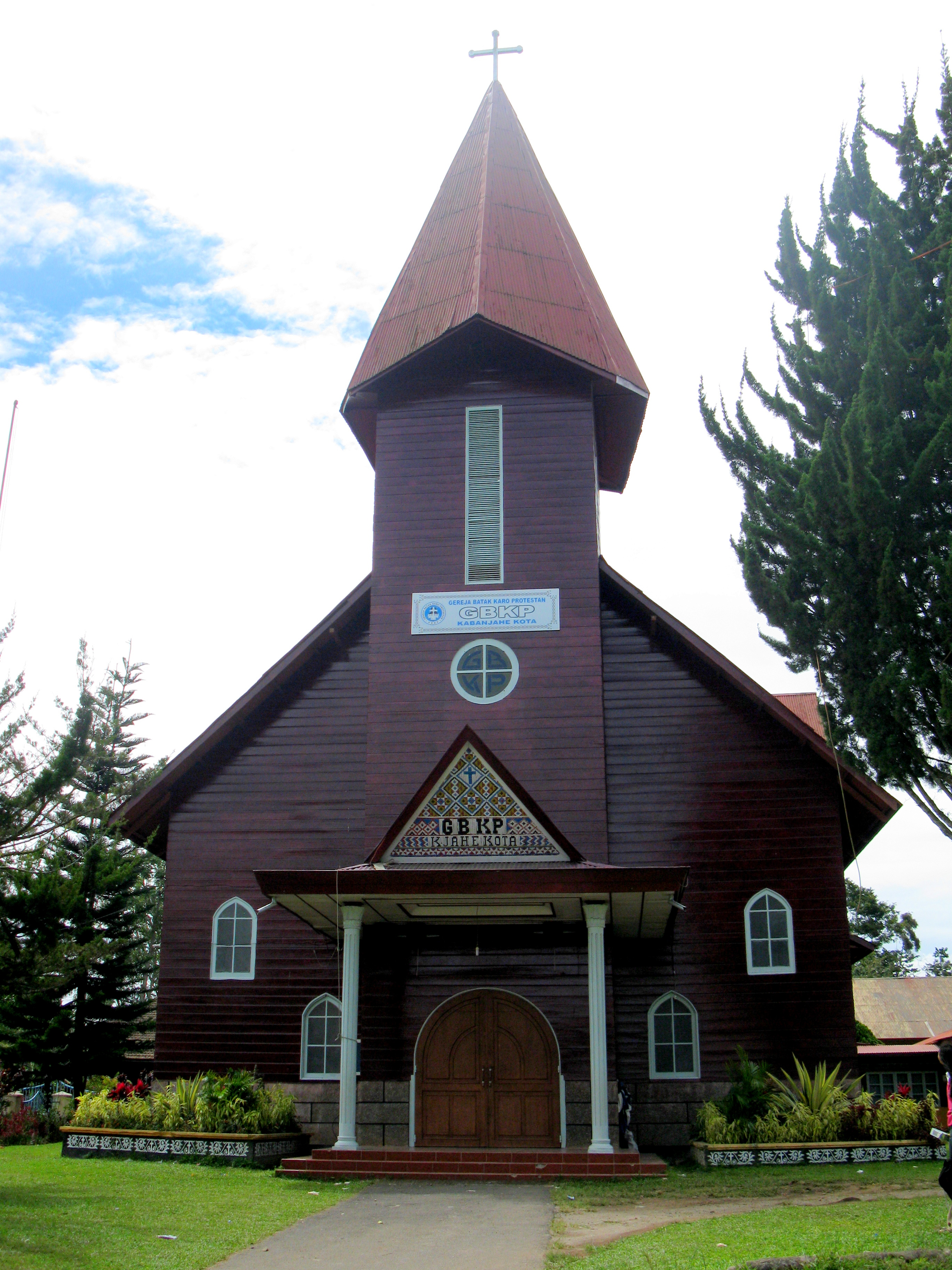
A Karo people church affiliated with Karo Batak Protestant Church (GBKP). Kabanjahe, Karo Regency, North Sumatra.

The Gereja Batak Karo Protestan or Karo Batak Protestant Church is the largest church among the largely Christian Karo people of North Sumatra, Indonesia. It was established formally in 1941.

The first Christian evangelism was conducted among the Karo people in 1890 by the Netherlands Missionary Society. Due to the perceived association with the colonialism of the Dutch East Indies, only a minority of the Karo converted initially, and it was not until after Indonesian independence in 1945 that Christianity acquired significant support among the Karo people.

The church has 276,000 members (as of 2006) in 398 congregations with 196 pastors. Member of the World Communion of Reformed Churches. As of 2020, GBKP has 400,000 active members in 27 classis and 773 congregations.

The Head Office from GBKP or "Gereja Batak Karo Protestan" is located at Pala Bangun Captain Street No 66 Kabanjahe in North Sumatera. From 2020, Pdt. Krismas Imanta Barus acts as the Chairperson, Pdt. Yunus Bangun as the General Secretary, and Mulia Perangin-angin as the Treasurer.
