= Christianity in Indonesia =

Christianity in Indonesia Kekristenan di Indonesia
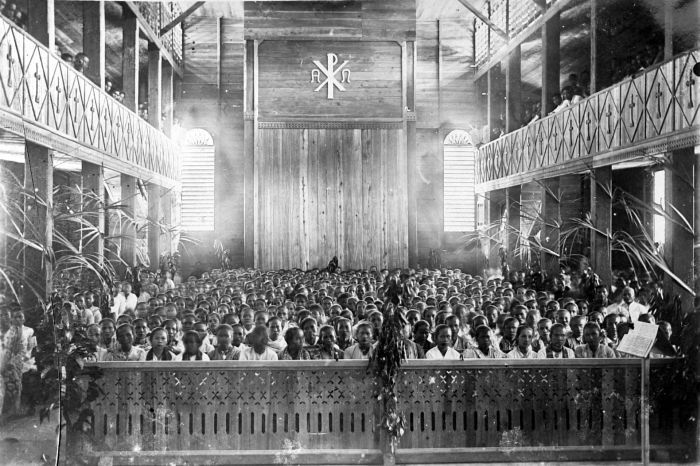
- A church service in Gunungsitoli, Nias, c. 1900.

Total population
- ▲30.102.764 (2025); 10.44% of the population

Regions with significant populations
- Majority: Central Papua, Highland Papua, South Papua, Southwest Papua, West Papua, East Nusa Tenggara, and North Sulawesi; Significant minority: North Sumatra, Jakarta, West Kalimantan, Central Kalimantan, South Sulawesi, West Sulawesi, Central Sulawesi, North Maluku, Maluku

Scriptures
- Bible

Languages
- Indonesian (official), English (international worship services), various regional languages

Christianity is Indonesia's second-largest religion, after Islam. As of 2025, Christians constitute 10.44% (30.1 million) of the country's population, with 7.37% Protestant (21.2 million) and 3.07% Catholic (8.86 million). In Indonesia, the word Kristen (lit. 'Christian') exclusively refers to Protestants, while Catholics are referred to as Katolik. Some provinces in Indonesia are majority Christian. In the 21st century, the rate of growth and spread of Christianity has increased.

Indonesia has the second-largest Christian population in Southeast Asia after the Philippines, the largest Protestant population in Southeast Asia, and the third-largest Christian population in Asia after the Philippines and China. Indonesia also has the second-largest Christian population in the Muslim world after Nigeria.

Traditional Christian areas and ethnic groups in Indonesia are concentrated in the interior of North Sumatra (the Batak; Karo, Simalungun, Toba), Nias, some Chinese, Mentawai, the interior of Kalimantan (the Dayak), Minahasa, Sangir, Pamona, Kulawi, Toraja, Mamasa, East Nusa Tenggara, the Maluku Islands, and Papua. There are also several predominantly Christian villages in Central Java, Yogyakarta, and East Java, where the majority of the population lives among Muslims, as well as Bali, where the majority of the population lives among Hindus.

Christians are the most educated religious group in Indonesia. According to a 2016 study conducted by the Pew Research Center under the name Religion and Education Worldwide, around 15% of Christians in Indonesia have tertiary education and have a bachelor's degree, compared to 12% of Buddhists, about 9% of Hindus, and about 7% of Muslims in Indonesia.

== Distribution ==
Christianity in Indonesia
1. Protestant and other Christian denominations (70.8%)
2. Catholic (29.2%)
Christianity in Indonesia by ethnic groups (2010)
1. Batak (20.1%)
2. Javanese (10.4%)
3. Dayak (8.64%)
4. Minahasa (6.30%)
5. Chinese (5.19%)
6. Betawi (0.65%)
7. Balinese (0.21%)
8. Others (48.6%)

Christianity is not evenly spread throughout the archipelago. Eight Indonesian provinces with a majority of the population identifying as Christian are Central Papua, Highland Papua, Papua, South Papua, Southwest Papua, West Papua, East Nusa Tenggara, and North Sulawesi.

Majority religion map in Indonesia (2022), Protestants are shown in blue and Catholics in magenta

Christianity by province in Indonesia (2022)
Province	Total population	Protestant	Catholic	Christians population	% Christian
Aceh	5,432,312	62,758	5,704	68,462	1.26%
Bali	4,304,574	71,933	35,604	107,537	2.50%
Bangka Belitung Islands	1,490,418	31,382	19,298	50,680	3.40%
Banten	12,321,660	322,213	148,557	470,770	3.82%
Bengkulu	2,065,573	33,303	8,062	41,365	2.00%
Central Java	37,783,666	593,665	344,241	937,906	2.48%
Central Kalimantan	2,706,950	450,863	90,286	541,149	19.99%
Central Papua	1,348,463	924,745	259,421	1,184,166	87.82%
Central Sulawesi	3,099,717	501,481	28,286	529,767	17.09%
East Java	41,311,181	679,059	273,800	952,859	2.31%
East Kalimantan	3,941,766	295,113	175,114	470,227	11.93%
East Nusa Tenggara	5,543,239	2,007,924	2,971,540	4,979,466	89.83%
Gorontalo	1,215,387	17,658	1,137	18,795	1.55%
Highland Papua	1,459,544	1,320,124	109,496	1,429,620	97.95%
Jakarta	11,317,271	969,907	439,803	1,409,710	12.46%
Jambi	3,696,044	122,642	21,268	143,910	3.89%
Lampung	8,947,458	121,757	77,227	198,984	2.22%
Maluku	1,893,324	749,410	130,070	879,480	46.45%
North Kalimantan	726,989	141,897	46,764	188,661	25.95%
North Maluku	1,346,267	333,026	7,136	340,162	25.27%
North Sulawesi	2,666,821	1,677,744	118,612	1,796,356	67.36%
North Sumatra	15,372,437	4,096,498	657,673	4,754,171	30.92%
Papua	1,073,354	689,401	60,374	749,775	69.85%
Riau	6,743,099	659,689	72,507	732,196	10.86%
Riau Islands	2,133,491	255,466	54,457	309,923	14.53%
South Kalimantan	4,178,229	55,978	23,150	78,128	1.87%
South Papua	522,844	119,382	259,041	378,423	72.38%
South Sulawesi	9,300,745	688,910	150,301	839,211	9.02%
South Sumatra	8,755,074	85,177	50,383	135,560	1.55%
Southeast Sulawesi	2,707,061	44,840	16,368	61,108	2.26%
Southwest Papua	604,698	329,075	43,473	372,548	61.61%
West Java	49,339,490	876,680	302,241	1,178,921	2.39%
West Kalimantan	5,497,151	638,957	1,215,273	1,826,970	33.73%
West Nusa Tenggara	5,534,583	13,643	10,080	23,723	0.43%
West Papua	559,361	298,229	47,009	345,228	61.72%
West Sulawesi	1,450,610	192,284	15,761	208,045	14.34%
West Sumatra	5,664,988	85,548	47,301	122,849	2.17%
Yogyakarta	3,693,834	89,408	164,474	253,882	6.87%

Region	Christians population	Total population	% Christian
Java	5,105,714	155,767,102	3.25%
Kalimantan	3,017,669	13,366,853	22.73%
Lesser Sunda Islands	4,991,839	14.950.978	32.68%
Maluku Islands	1,184,787	3,239,591	39.44%
Sumatra	6,401,260	60,300,894	11.34%
Sulawesi	3,491,556	20,440,341	17.45%
Western Papua	4,891,366	5,568,264	87.88%

=== Sumatra ===
==== North Sumatra ====
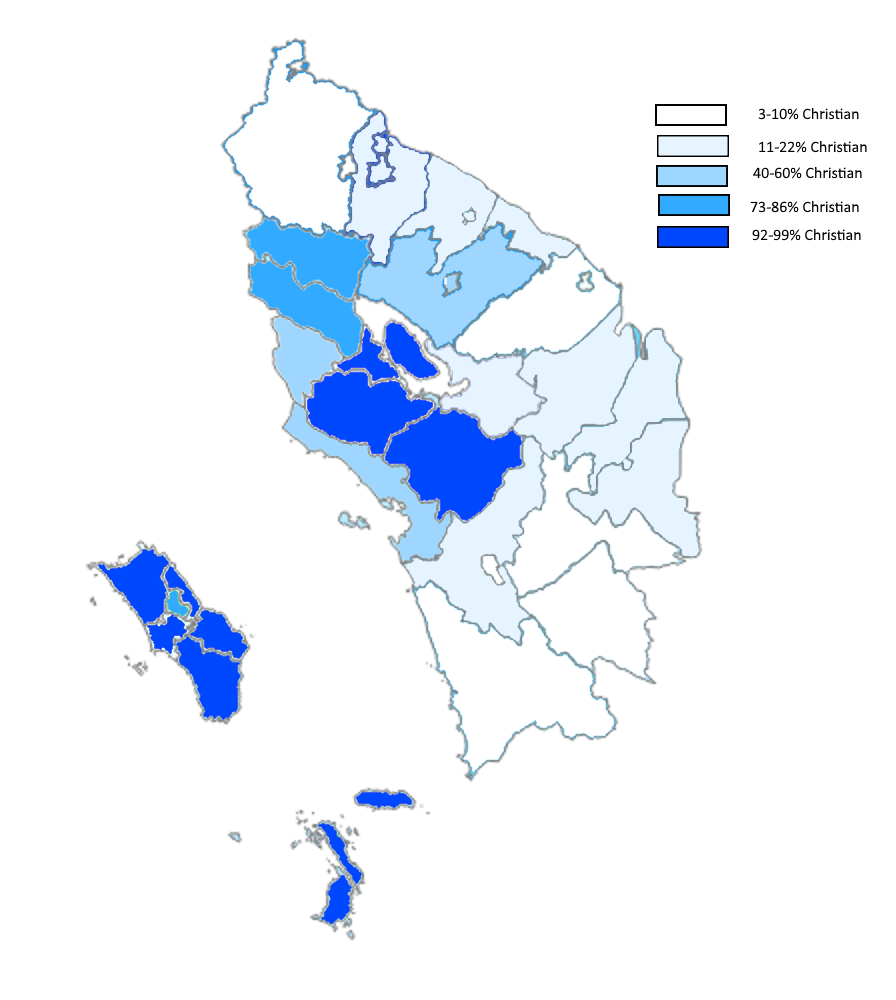
Map of North Sumatra's regencies, showing areas by the level of Christianity.

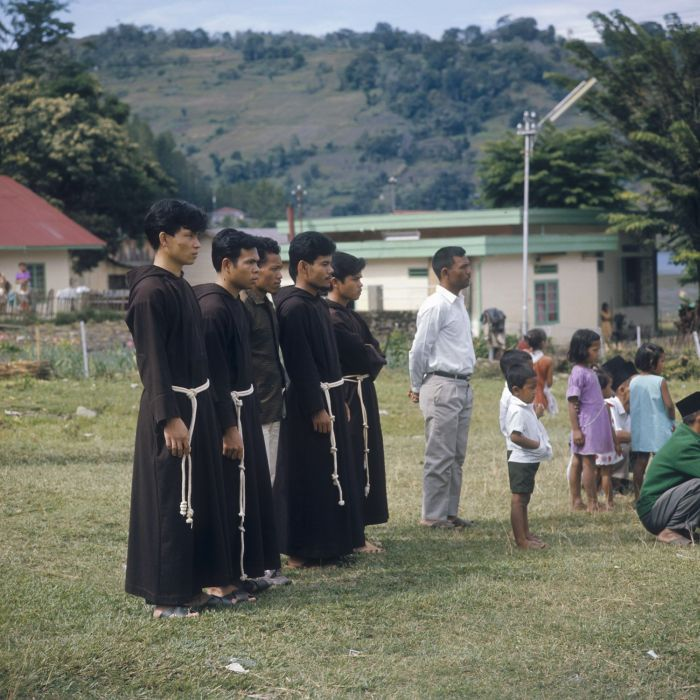
Catholic priests in Simalungun Regency, North Sumatra (1971)

Among Indonesian provinces in 2018, North Sumatra reported the second highest number of Christians (4.7 million) or 16.5% of Christians within Indonesia. North Sumatra had the seventh-highest percentage (among religions reported in the province) of Christians (31.6%), including the sixth-highest percentage of Protestants (27.3%), and 4.3% Catholic population. However, this varies by regency—the Nias islands are 95%+ Christian of Nias ethnicity, and all of the areas surrounding Lake Toba have large Christian populations of the Batak Toba, Karo and Pakpak ethnic groups. Apart from this, most other parts of North Sumatra have a significant Christianity percentage (around 20 to 40%), with the exception of Langkat, in the northeast coast, Asahan on the east coast, and the Mandailing regencies in the south which are Muslim majority (below 10%).

==== Elsewhere ====
Among Indonesian provinces in 2018, Sumatra's northernmost province, Aceh, reported the fifth-smallest number of Christians (69,401) or 0.024% of Christians within Indonesia. Aceh had the second-smallest percentage (among religions reported in the province) of Christians (1.19%), effectively tying with Gorontalo for the smallest percentage of Catholics (0.07%) and including the third-smallest percentage of Protestants (1.12%).

Aceh operates some elements of the Sharia law and all regencies are 99%+ Muslim, with the exception of Aceh Singkil (11.2% Christian) and Southeast Aceh (18.7% Christian). Both areas' Christian populations consist of ethnic groups whose homelands lie outside Aceh—in Aceh Singkil, Christians are mostly Pakpak people, whose homeland is to the east of Aceh Singkil, in Pakpak Bharat Regency, of North Sumatra, as well as a small population of Nias people, on the Banyak Islands; in Southeast Aceh, the Christian population consists of Karo people, whose homeland lies to the south, in the Karo Regency of North Sumatra. There are more than 100 churches, serving Southeast Aceh's 20,000 Christians, but the government of Aceh Singkil permits only one church and four chapels for its 10,000 Christians.

West Sumatra province (population 4.8 million) is another that is 99%+ Muslim in all areas, with the exception of the Mentawai Islands, whose 75,000 population is 80%, Christian. The province of Riau has a population of 5.5 million, which is 10% Christian, mainly of Batak ethnicity, and spread throughout the north side of the province, especially at Rokan Hilir Regency, Dumai, Duri and capital city Pekanbaru. The remaining provinces of Sumatra, all consist of 2–3% Christians. Only Batam (of the Riau Islands province), which is 20% Christian, has more than around 5% Christians of the regencies outside Aceh, Riau and North Sumatra.

And then, South Sumatra reported the eleventh-smallest number of Christians (129,068) or 0.453625183% of Christians within Indonesia. South Sumatra had the third-smallest percentage (among religions reported in the province) of Christians (1.57%), including the second-smallest percentage of Protestants (0.97%) and eighth-smallest percentage of Catholics (0.6%).

=== Java ===
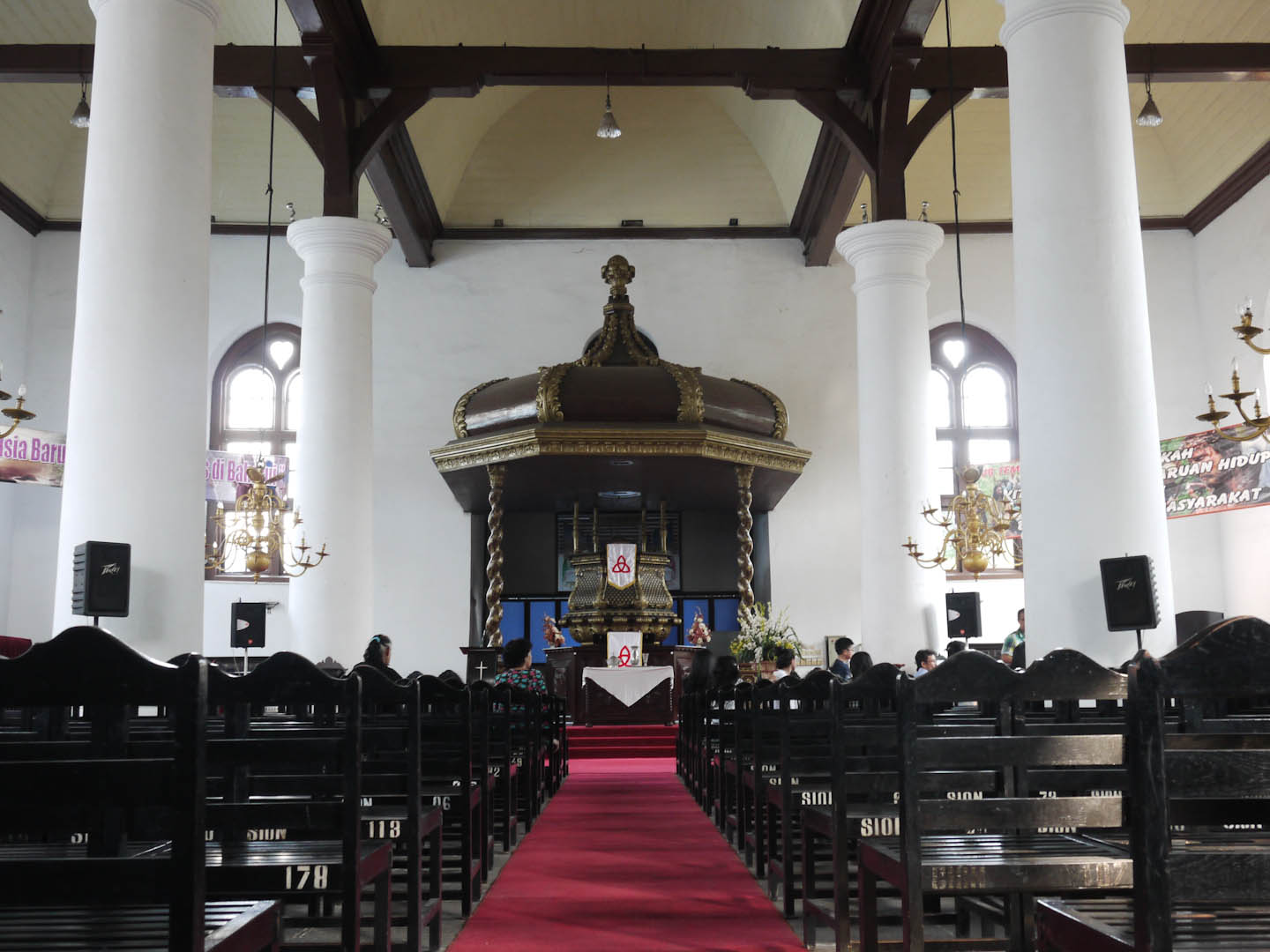
Sion Church is the oldest church in Indonesia.

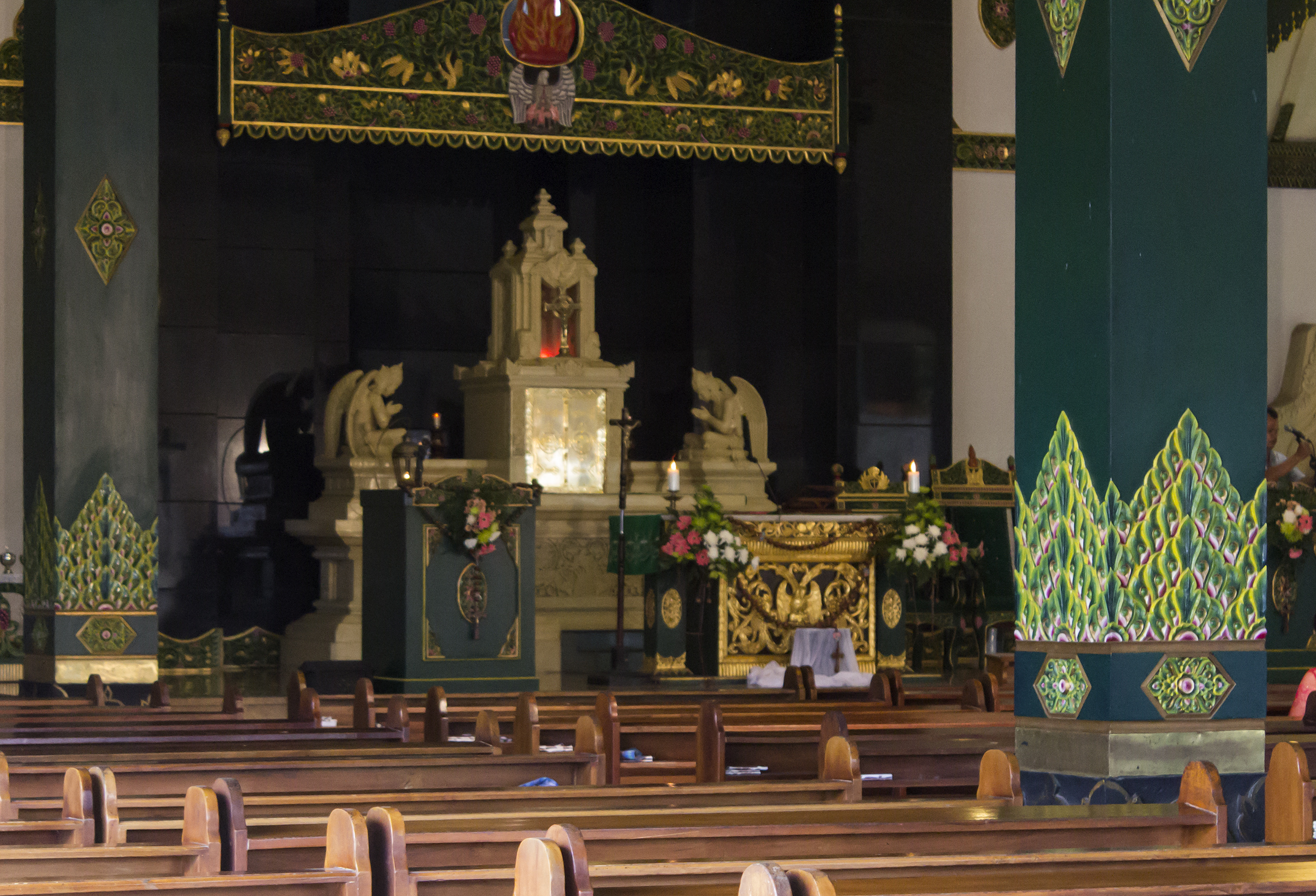
The church of Ganjuran in Yogyakarta features Javanese and Hindu elements.

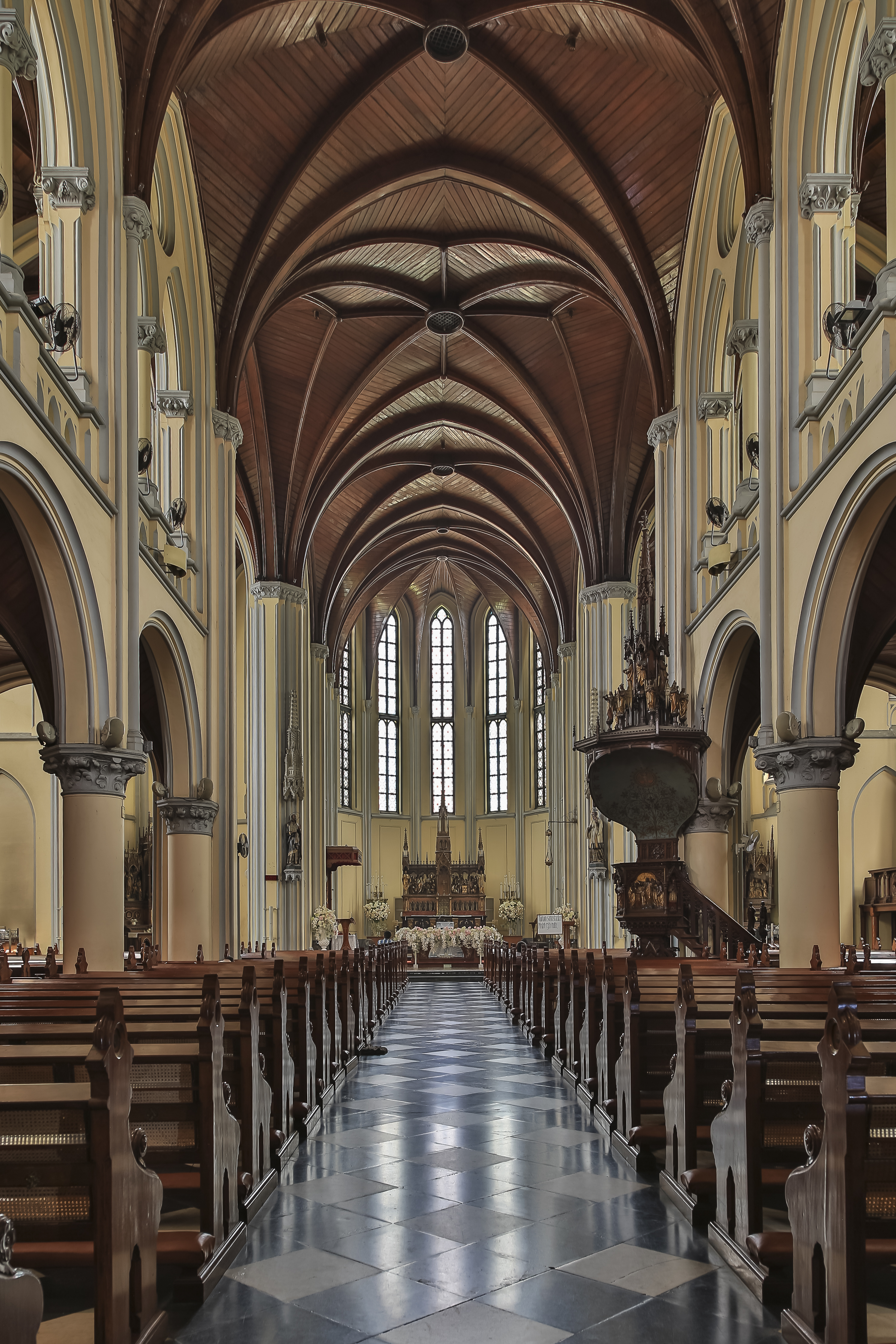
Interior view of the Jakarta Cathedral

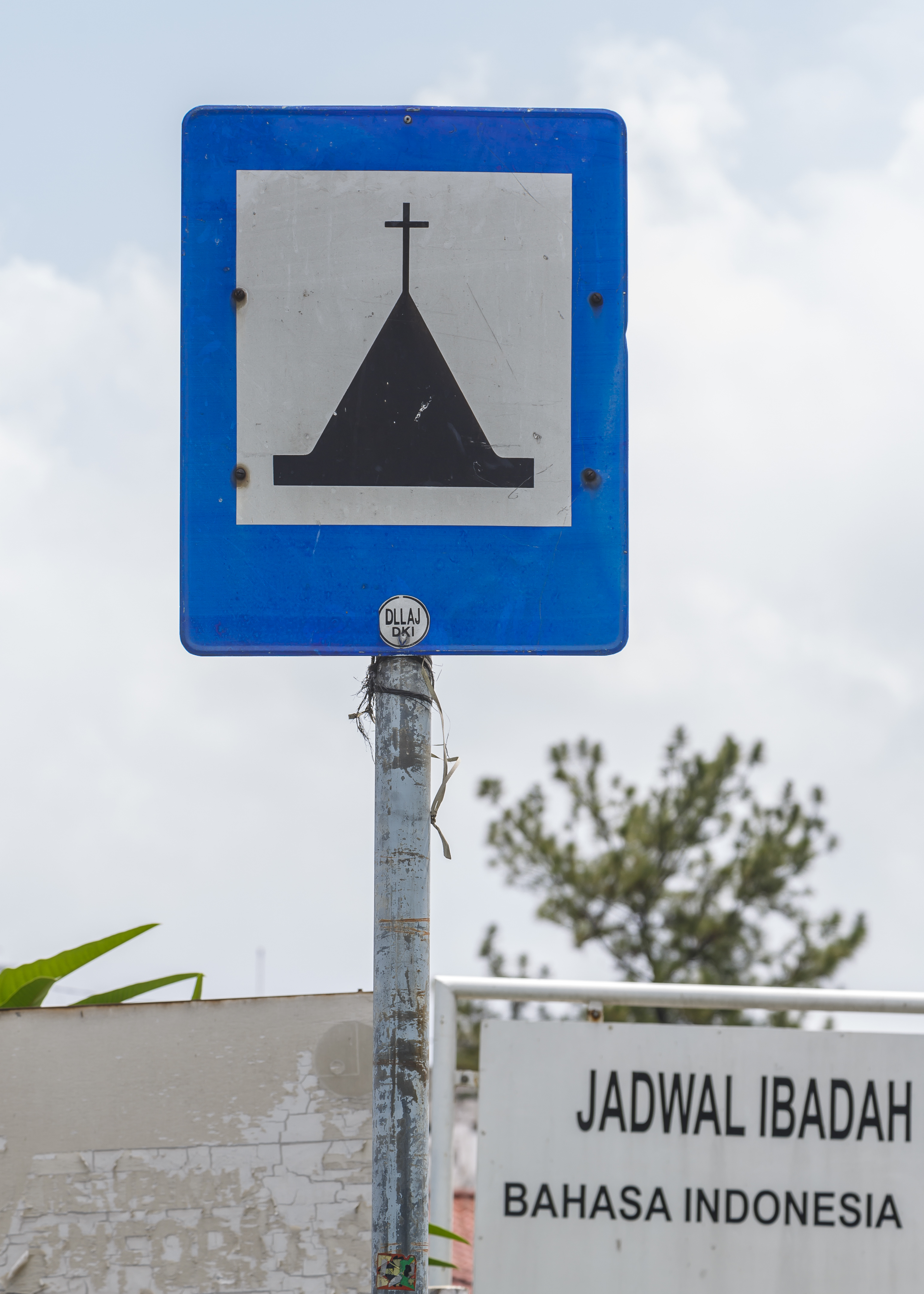
"Church" traffic sign in Jakarta

Banten, Java's westernmost province has 3.6% Christians out of 10 million people, who live almost entirely in Tangerang Regency, Tangerang city, and South Tangerang city. Jakarta has around 12.5% Christian population, of which 2/3 is Protestant and the remainder Catholic. Christians are distributed all over Jakarta, with the exception of the Thousand Islands, which are nearly 100% Muslim. Christianity in Jakarta is linked to the Batak and Chinese population (which also is of the Buddhist faith), and the most Christian district, Kelapa Gading is 35% Christian due to its large Chinese population.

West Java province has only around one million Christians (of which three-quarters are Protestant) out of a population of 40 million. This population is concentrated in the cities of Bandung (7% Christian) and Bekasi (10% Christian).

The 32 million people of Central Java include 960,000 Christians, of which roughly 2/3 is Protestant. This population is again concentrated in cities, with Semarang 12% Christian, and Magelang, Salatiga and Surakarta exceeding 20% Christians.

The special region of Yogyakarta (population 3.5 million) is overall around 7.5% Christian, a population which is concentrated in Yogyakarta city and neighbouring Sleman. Yogyakarta's Christian population is around 2/3 Catholic.

East Java's population of 37.5 million includes 964,900 Christians (70% of which are Protestant). As with the rest of Java, this population is concentrated in the cities, with Surabaya's 2.8 million citizens more than 10% Christian, and Christian populations of around 8% in Mojokerto, Madiun, Kediri, Blitar and Malang.

The provinces of Java range from 5% Christian up to 12.5% in the capital, Jakarta.

=== Kalimantan ===
In Kalimantan, there are substantial (25–35%) Christian populations (mostly Dayak people) in West, Central, East, and North Kalimantan provinces, while in South Kalimantan the seafaring Banjar people are Muslims, and there is only a small (1–2%) Christian population.

West Kalimantan province has 1.8 million Christians of its 5.4 million population. This population is 2/3 Catholic. Coastal regions of West Kalimantan have a Muslim majority, as well as a significant Chinese Buddhist population, of up to 30% (in Singkawang city). Away from the coasts, there is overall a Christian majority, but in some areas, Muslims are in the majority. The 2.5 million population of Central Kalimantan includes 430,000 Protestants, and 81,400 Catholics. Most of the rest of the population is Muslim, but a significant (7%) proportion follows Kaharingan Dayak beliefs. The 3.6 million of South Kalimantan includes only 75,000 Christians. Of 3.6 million in East Kalimantan, 430,000 are Christian. There are Christian majorities in Malinau and Kutai Barat regencies. The remainder of the population is Muslim.

=== Lesser Sunda Islands ===
==== East Nusa Tenggara ====
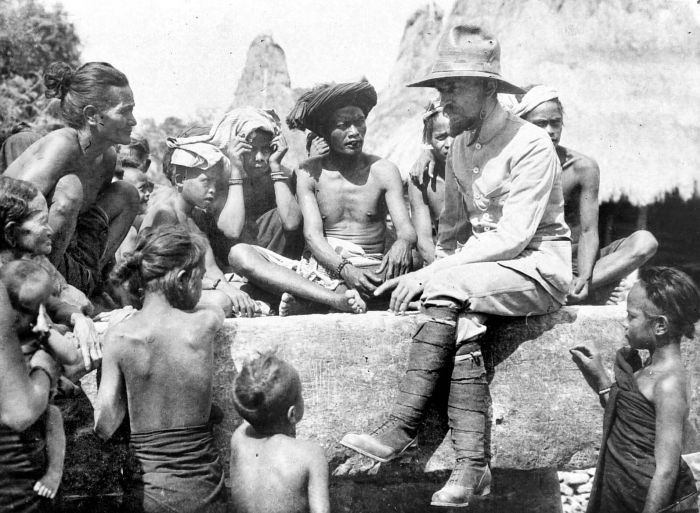
A Protestant missionary minister, Wiebe van Dijk sitting on a Sumbanese tomb, preaching the Gospel to the people of Sumba, circa 1925–1929.

Among Indonesian provinces in 2018, East Nusa Tenggara had the highest percentage (among religions reported in the province) of Christians (89.73%), including the highest percentage of Catholics (53.56%) and the fifth-highest percentage of Protestants (36.17%). East Nusa Tenggara also reported the highest total number of Christians (4.8 million) or 17% of Christians within Indonesia. The mix of religions and denominations varies significantly from area to area. Sumba island has a Catholic majority in Southwest Sumba Regency, but otherwise, Protestants outnumber Catholics five-to-one, in an island that is around 80% Christian, 15% animist, and 5% Muslim. West Timor is around 98% Christian, a population that is around 90% Catholic in the eastern two regencies, and 90% Protestant in the western regencies The Savu islands consist of 80% Protestants, with the balance practising traditional religion. The Rote islands are 95% Protestant, with Islamic and Catholic minorities. Pantar island has a population of 45,000 with a slight Islamic majority to the west, larger Protestant majorities to the east and central area. Neighbouring Alor island has similar demographics, with an Islamic majority in the extreme west, the rest of the island heavily Protestant, with a Catholic minority. Lembata island is 70% Catholic, with 27% Muslim, and just 2% Protestants. The main island of East Nusa Tenggara, Flores, has 1–2% Protestants throughout its area. The balance of the population is almost entirely Catholic with a Muslim minority that comprises around 20–25% in the far west, and the east, and under 10% in central area.

==== Elsewhere ====
Among Indonesian provinces in 2018, West Nusa Tenggara had the smallest percentage (among religions reported in the province) of Christians (0.45%), including the smallest percentage of Protestants (0.26%) and third-smallest percentage of Catholics (0.19%). West Nusa Tenggara reported the second-smallest number of Christians (23,353) or 0.1% of Christians within Indonesia. Slightly larger concentrations are found in Mataram, and Bima cites, both with just 2% Christians.

In Bali, 86% of the population adheres to Hinduism. Christianity is a minor religion (<1%), with the exception of the Kuta districts (7–11%) of Badung regency, and Mengwi, Badung, which has 3% Christians. Denpasar city has 6% Christians.

=== Sulawesi ===
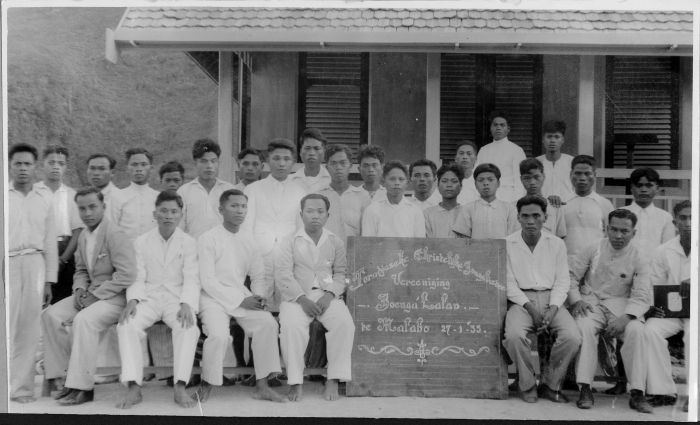
Christian mission in Tana Toraja Regency, Netherlands colonial period. Picture credits: Tropenmuseum

==== North Sulawesi ====
Among Indonesian provinces in 2018, North Sulawesi reported the fourth-highest number of Christians (1.54 million) or 6.3% of Christians within Indonesia. North Sulawesi had the third-highest percentage (among religions reported in the province) of Christians (68.01%), including the second-highest percentage of Protestants (63.6%) and 4.4% Catholic population. North Sulawesi splits between a Protestant north/east, including the Sangihe, Sitaro and Talaud islands to the north and the entire Minahasa region, with an Islamic majority in Mongondow regencies. However, there are around 25% Christians in Mongondow, and around 15% Muslims in Minahasa (except for Manado city, which has 30%).

==== Elsewhere ====
Gorontalo province is a stark contrast to its eastern neighbour, North Sulawesi. Among Indonesian provinces in 2018, Gorontalo reported the smallest number of Christians (18,538) or 0.07% of Christians within Indonesia. Gorontalo had the fourth-smallest percentage (among religions reported in the province) of Christians (1.57%), including the smallest percentage of Catholics (0.09%) and the seventh-smallest percentage of Protestants (1.58%).

The region of Central Sulawesi is overall 17% Protestant; however, this ranges from 3% in Buol, to the west of North Sulawesi, up to 56%, in the central Poso Regency. Sigi Regency located to the west of Poso Regency also has a large Protestant population at 34%. Only in the Banggai islands (4%) has a Catholic population exceeding 1%.

West Sulawesi is predominantly Islamic along the coastal areas, but the interior Mamasa Regency, culturally part of the Toraja lands, is 75% Protestant.

The regencies of South Sulawesi are mostly Islamic (with many having a percentage of 99%+ Muslims); however, Tana Toraja and North Toraja regencies are 19% Catholic, and, respectively, 62% and 71% Protestant. In addition, the Luwu regencies and Palopo, to the north of Toraja, are around 15% Protestant. Makassar city has around 14% Christians, including 2% Catholics.

Southeast Sulawesi regency has just around 2.3% Christians.

=== Maluku ===
Around 46% of the Southern Maluku's population is Christian. This population is overwhelmingly Protestant, except in the east, in the Kai, Tanimbar and Aru islands, which have Catholic populations. Only in the Kai islands is Catholicism the predominant denomination. In the northern province of North Maluku, 74.2% adheres to the Islamic religion while 25.4% adheres to Christianity (out of which 24.9% are Protestantism and 0.52% adheres to Catholicism). Protestantism and Islam are otherwise unevenly distributed among the islands, with Ternate and Tidore 95% Islamic.

=== Papua ===
Among Indonesian provinces in 2018, Papua had the second-highest percentage (among religions reported in the province) of Christians (84.42%), the highest percentage of Protestants (69.02%), and 15.4% of residents reporting to be Catholic. This equates to 3.67 million Christians or 12.8% of Christians within Indonesia. In West Papua province, 54.12% of residents registered as Protestant and 7.63% of residents registered as Catholic, for a total of 61.75%. This equates to 708,958 Christians or 2.5% of Christians within Indonesia.

=== Chinese Indonesians ===
Chinese Indonesians, in particular, have increasingly embraced Christianity. The 2000 census indicated that 35% of Chinese Indonesians designated themselves as Christian. However, the Chinese Indonesian population in general was probably undercounted. The percentage of Chinese Indonesians who belong to Christian churches continues to increase and may exceed 70 percent.

Some reports also show that many of the Chinese Indonesians minority convert to Christianity. Demographer Aris Ananta reported in 2008 that "anecdotal evidence suggests that more Buddhist Chinese have become Christians as they increased their standards of education".

== Music ==
There are many Christian songwriters in Indonesia, but their market reach has reached many Christian communities across the country. A network of praise and worship bands, such as JPCC Worship, Sari Simorangkir, and others, has been formed to promote Indonesian Christian music within Christian communities and worship services.

A Christian arts festival called Pesparawi (Indonesian: Pesta Paduan Suara Gerejawi), is a religious festival for the Indonesian Protestant Christian community specialising in church music. For the Catholic community, with the same but to be called the Pesparani (Indonesian: Pesta Paduan Suara Gerejani). This event aims to foster, enhance, and unite Christians from various universities across Indonesia through choral arts, as well as serving as a training platform to hone the expression and vocal skills of church singers. This event serves as a gathering place for Christians from across Indonesia to build togetherness and unity, and strengthen bonds of brotherhood. This event serves not only as a competition but also as a means to strengthen faith, brotherhood, and unity among Christians, both at the national and university levels.

== Bible translation ==
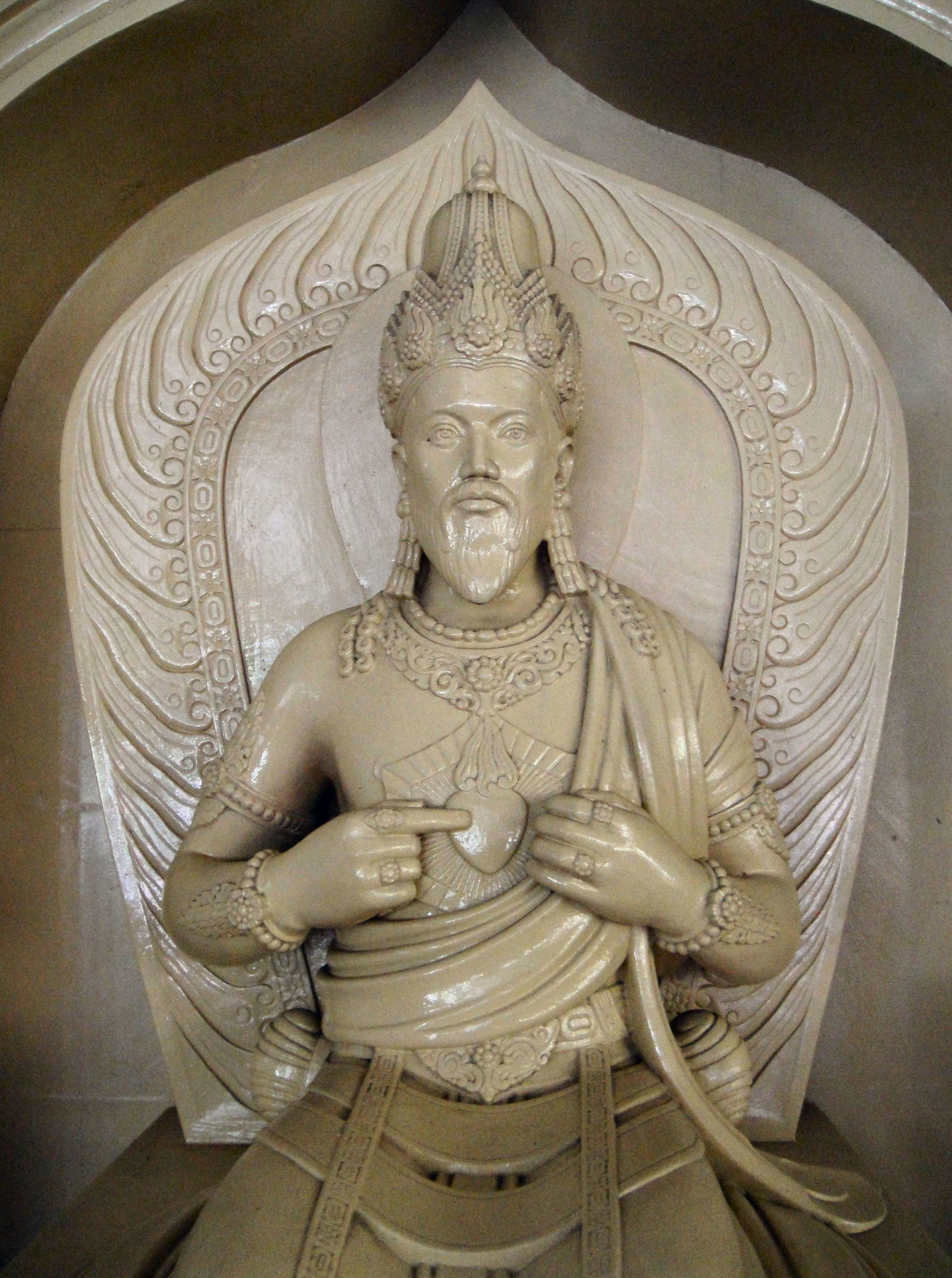
"Sang Maha Prabu Yesus Kristus Pangeraning Para Bangsa", depiction of Jesus as a Javanese king at Ganjuran Church, Bantul, Special Region of Yogyakarta.

The first translation of the Bible ("Alkitab") into the Malay language was Albert Corneliszoon Ruyl's translation of the book of Matthew (1629). Between then and now at least 22 other translations exist, excluding the translations to local languages of Indonesia (out of more than 700 local languages of Indonesia, more than 100 languages have portions or whole Bible translated, while some, like Javanese and Batak, have more than one version). In 1820, Gottlob Brückner (1783–1857) translated the Bible into Javanese, the most widely spoken language of Indonesia.

== Seminaries and schools ==
Before Indonesian independence, the only seminary was the theological seminary in Bogor. This seminary was founded in 1934 as the Hoogere Theologische School (Higher School of Theology) and is now known as STT (Sekolah Tinggi Theologia) Jakarta. As of 2002, Indonesia claimed more than 100 theological seminaries, with 29 seminaries representing 70% of students being members of PERSETIA (Association of Theological Schools in Indonesia). Other seminaries belong to PASTI (evangelical association) or PERSATPIM (Pentecostal association).

== History ==
=== Early history ===
In the Middle Ages, Nestorian Christianity was the first denomination of the religion to reach the Malay archipelago, brought over by Christian Persian traders who adhered to the Church of the East.

A 12th-century Christian Egyptian record of churches suggests that either an Oriental Orthodox or Nestorian church was established in Barus, on the west coast of North Sumatra, a trading post known to have been frequented by Indian traders, and therefore linked to the Indian Saint Thomas Christians.

In the 14th century, Catholic Franciscan friar and Missionary Odoric of Pordenone visited Java, Borneo, and Sumatra while sailing from India to China, he was the first Christian European to make a recorded visit to the islands.

The Portuguese arrived in the Malacca Sultanate (modern-day Malaysia) in 1509 seeking access to its wealth. Although initially well-received, the capture of Goa in 1510 as well as other Muslim–Christian conflicts convinced the Malaccan Muslims that the Portuguese Christians would be a hostile presence. The resulting capture of Malacca in 1511 is believed to have enhanced a sense of Muslim solidarity against the Christian Portuguese, and ongoing resistance against the Portuguese came from Muslim Aceh as well as from the Ottoman Empire. Although the Portuguese built some churches in Portuguese Malacca itself, their evangelical influence in neighbouring territories was perhaps more negative than positive in promulgating Christianity.

=== Batavia (Jakarta) ===
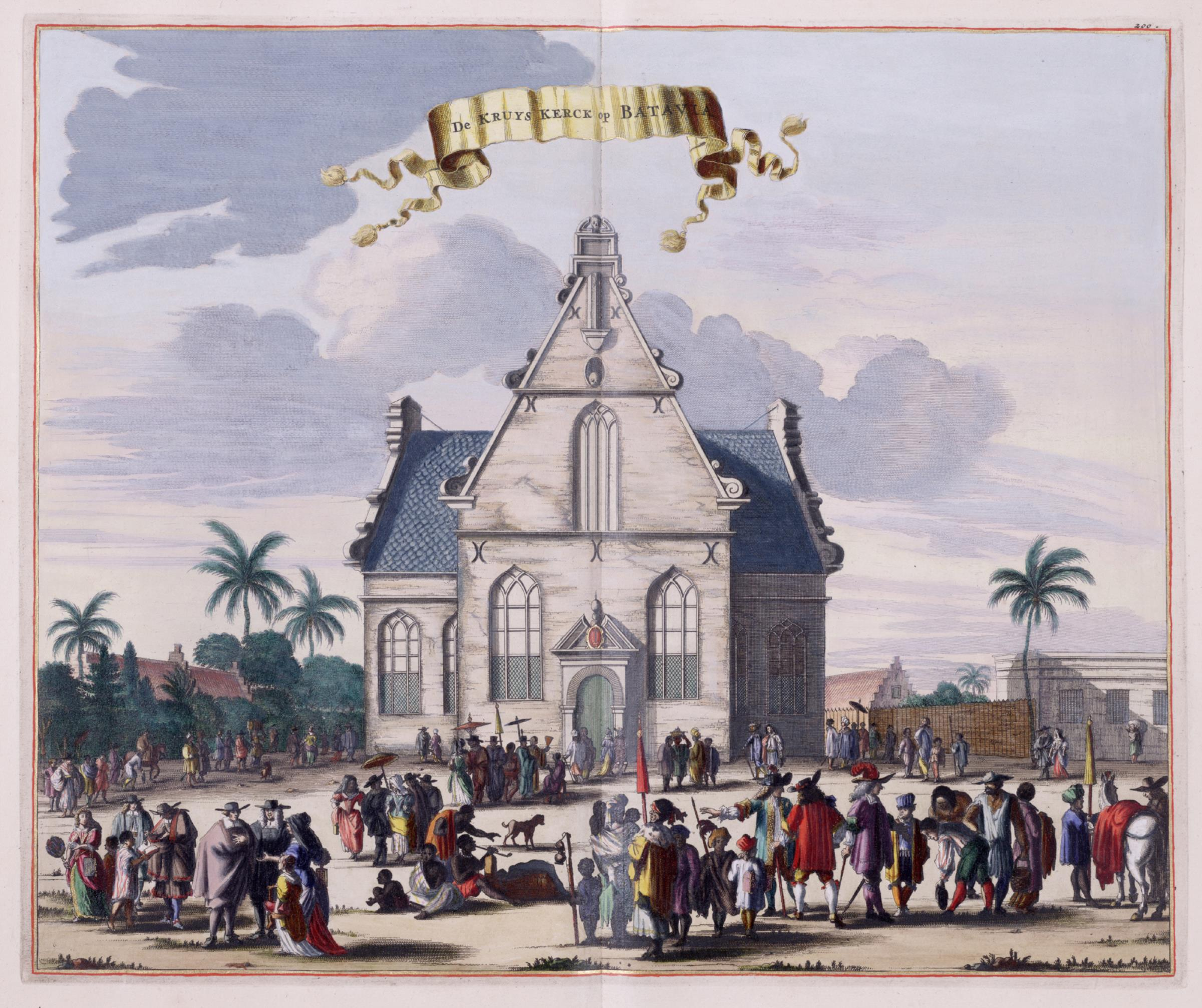
Dutch church or 'Kruiskerk' in Batavia c. 1682

As the centre for the VOC in the Indies, there were many European Christians as well as Asian Christians from areas proselytised by the Portuguese. The predominant denomination in Batavia was Dutch Reformed but there were also Lutherans and Catholics. The Dutch governors constructed Reformed churches, for Portuguese, Dutch and Malay speakers. Other religions were formally prohibited, but in practice, Chinese temples, as well as mosques, remained in existence, and despite various measures to promote Christianity, there was a high degree of religious diversity and never at any time a Christian majority. At other VOC settlements clergy were likewise provided, such as at Semarang, where the minister had a congregation that was only half Reformed and half Catholic or Lutheran and consequently efforts were made to provide inclusive preaching. Largely, however, the VOC had little impact or interest in upsetting their business interests in favour of religious ideas, and indeed the theology of the Dutch Reformed church was opposed to the mass baptism adopted by Catholic missionaries, and their impact on Java as a whole was very minor.

=== Sumatra ===
==== The Batak mission ====
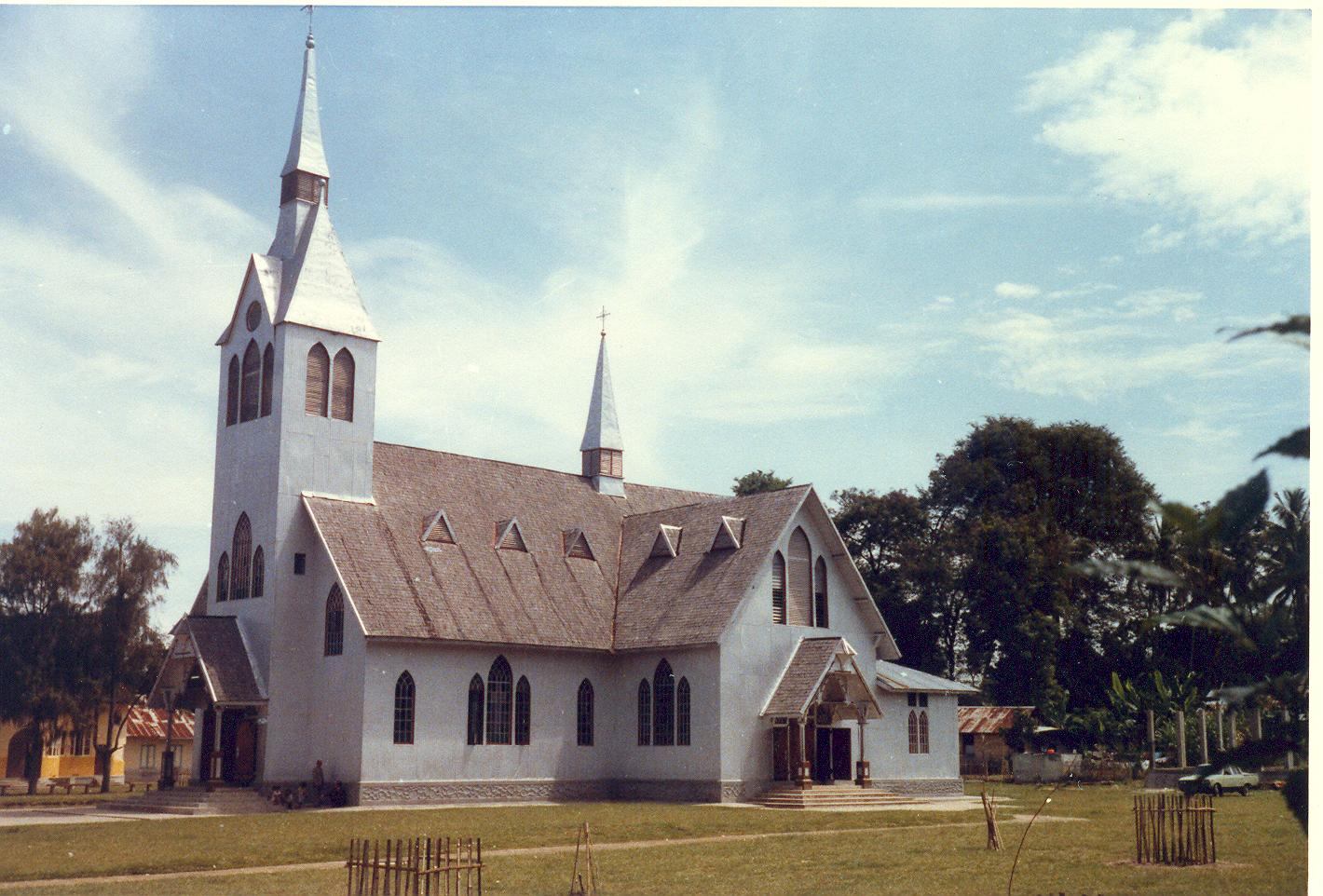
Huria Kristen Batak Protestan church in Balige

The largely mountainous 'Bataklands' of North Sumatra were surrounded to the north by the staunchly Islamic Acehnese, to the south by the Islamic Minangkabau and to the east by the Malays (also Muslims). The 'Bataks' were regarded by outsiders as a race of pagan cannibals, and it was largely their rejection of Islam that distinguished them from their neighbours. At the turn of the 19th century the southernmost Batak people, the Mandailing came, through their subjection in the Padri War, to follow Islam, rejecting traditional beliefs and, frequently, their identity as 'Batak'.

Further north, however, Batak proved more resistant to the effect of Padri War campaigns, and receptive indeed to Christianity. The first missionaries were sent by Stamford Raffles in 1824, at which time Sumatra was under temporary British rule. They observed that the Batak seemed receptive to new religious thought, and were likely to fall to the first mission, either Islamic or Christian, to attempt conversion.

In 1834, the American Board of Commissioners for Foreign Missions established a second mission, which met a brutal end when its two American Baptist missionaries, Samuel Munson and Henry Lyman, were killed by Batak people resisting outside interference with their traditional adat.

On 26 January 1857, Dutch missionary Gerrit van Asselt from independent church in Ermelo, arrived in Sipirok, Sumatra, marking the definitive introduction of Christianity into the community of (Batak) Angkola people in Sipirok. Shortly after his arrival, he was joined by another fellow Dutch missionaries: Dammerboer, Van Dalen and Koster—including Friedrich Wilhelm Betz who arrived in Sipirok in 1859.

In 1861, missionaries from the German Rhenish Missionary Society (Rheinische Missionsgesellschaft, or RMG) Johann Carl Klammer and Wilhelm Heine arrived in Sipirok, after being expelled due to a rebellion in Borneo. They met with Gerrit van Asselt and Friedrich Wilhelm Betz from Ermelo, who later also joined the RMG. They founded some of the earliest congregations in the Batak lands, such as the Batak Church at Sipirok in 1861 and the early community at Parau Sorat.

On 30 August 1862, Ludwig Ingwer Nommensen from the Rhenish Missionary Society also arrived in Sipirok, and joined with other RMG missionaries (Johann Carl Klammer, Wilhelm Heine, Gerrit van Asselt and Friedrich Wilhelm Betz) stationed in Sipirok. He then led the missionary expansion from Sipirok into the Batak interior lands in Silindung, Humbang, Toba, Samosir Island, and multiple regions in the Sumatra's East Coast Residency. The mission was immensely successful, being well supported financially from Germany, and adopted effective evangelistic strategies led by Nommensen, who spent most of his life from 1862 until his death in 1918 in North Sumatra, successfully converting many among the Simalungun and Batak Toba as well as a minority of Angkola.

Nommensen initially established Huta Dame, his 'village of peace', as Christian converts were excluded from their home villages, becoming knowledgeable in matters of Batak custom. Nommensen's success was supported by Peter Johannsen, who arrived in 1866, and has been praised for the quality of his Batak translations, as well as by respected Batak Raja Pontas Lumbantobing, an early convert. Nommensen's theology saw Christianity as renewing rather than replacing traditional Batak customs, except in cases where adat were in direct contradiction to the Christian faith.

The Batak Christian Protestant Church (Batak: Huria Kristen Batak Protestan, abbreviated: HKBP) is the church that was formed from Nommensen's actions. To meet the desire for education, a seminary was established, along with elementary schools in Christian villages. By 1918, on Nommensen's death, his church comprised 180,000 members, with 34 ministers and 788 teachers/preachers. The distinct identity of Batak Toba people, separate from their Muslim neighbours, and their future role within Indonesia was thus assured. Bishop Stephen Charles Neill (1900–1984) in his History of Christian Missions, describes Nommensen as "one of the most powerful missionaries of whom we have record anywhere".

As the process of decolonising continued following World Wars 1 and 2, the HKBP continued to grow, not just in the Tanah Batak, but also in Java and Medan, where many Bataks were seeking economic opportunities. The congregation grew 50% between 1951 and 1960, by which time it had reached 745,000. A growing disquiet at Toba 'imperialism' resulted in the establishment of the Gereja Kristen Protestan Simalungun and Gereja Kristen Protestan Angkola in the 1960s, both of which were expressions of a movement towards the native Simalungun and Angkola languages and traditions as against those of the Toba among their communities. In 1992, the Gereja Kristen Protestan Pakpak-Dairi, of the Pakpak-Dairi people was split from the HKBP.

While the traditional Batak church grew through rejecting only 'negative' adat, there is a more recent anti-adat movement among Pentecostals that perceives non-Christian elements of Batak culture, such as ulos as satanic. However, the negative assumption about traditional ulos clothing is considered by the theologists as a failure of those related Pentecostals movement in implementing the contextual theology or inculturation of faith, and HKBP has also confirmed that "Ulos Batak is not animism, at HKBP it becomes a visit from God". HKBP continues to grow to show its fruits with around 3,800 churches and more than 6.5 million congregations by the end of 2024, making HKBP the largest Christianity organisation in Indonesia and South East Asia, or the third largest religious organisation in Indonesia after the two Islamic organisations Muhammadiyah and Nahdatul Ulama (NU).

==== Karo Church ====
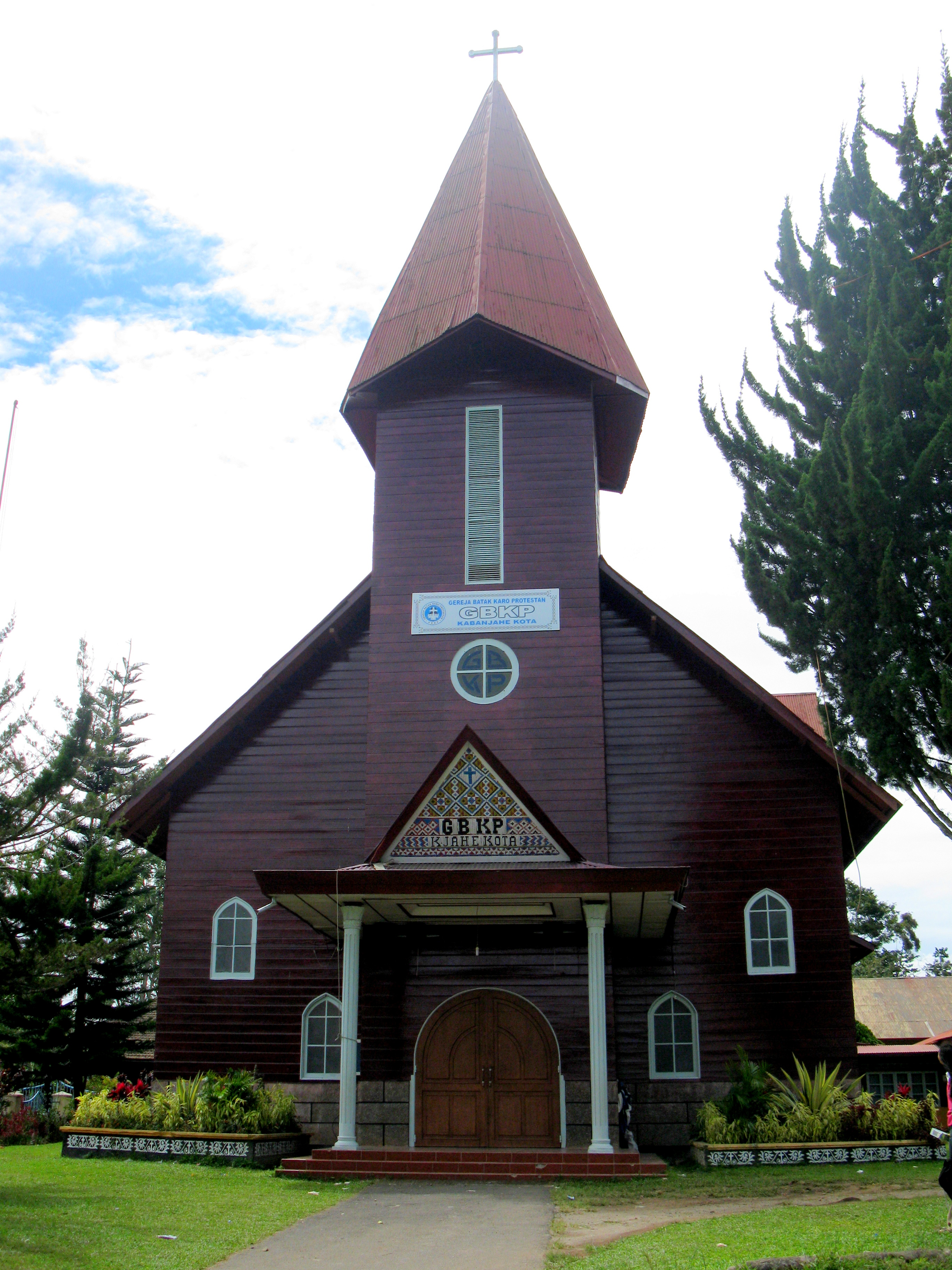
Karo Church in Kabanjahe, North Sumatra.

The (Batak) Karo people were harassing European interests in east Sumatra, and Jacob Theodoor Cremer, a Dutch administrator regarded evangelism as a means to suppress this activity. The Netherlands Missionary Society answered the call, commencing activities in the Karolands in 1890, where they engaged not only in evangelism but also in ethnology and documenting the Karo culture. The missionaries attempted to construct a base in Kabanjahe in the Karo highlands, but were repelled by the suspicious locals.

In retaliation, the Dutch administration waged a war to conquer the Karolands, as part of their final consolidation of power in the Indies. The Karo perceived Christianity as the 'Dutch religion', and its followers as 'dark-skinned Dutch'. In this context, the Karo church was initially unsuccessful, and by 1950 the church had only 5,000 members. In the years following Indonesian independence the perception of Christianity among the Karo as an emblem of colonialism faded, with the church itself adopting more elements of traditional Karo culture such as music (previously the brass band was promoted), and by 1965 the Karo church had grown to some 35,000 members, with 60,000 baptised in 1966–1970. At the same time, Islam was also being seen as increasingly attractive. From 5,000 Muslims (mostly non-Karo) in Karoland in 1950, there were 30,000 in 1970. Although the Gereja Batak Karo Protestan (GBKP) is the largest Karo church there are also Catholic (33,000 members as of 1986) and several Pentecostal denominations, such as the Assemblies of God and the Pentecostal Church in Indonesia.

=== Kalimantan ===
==== The Rhenish Missionary Society ====
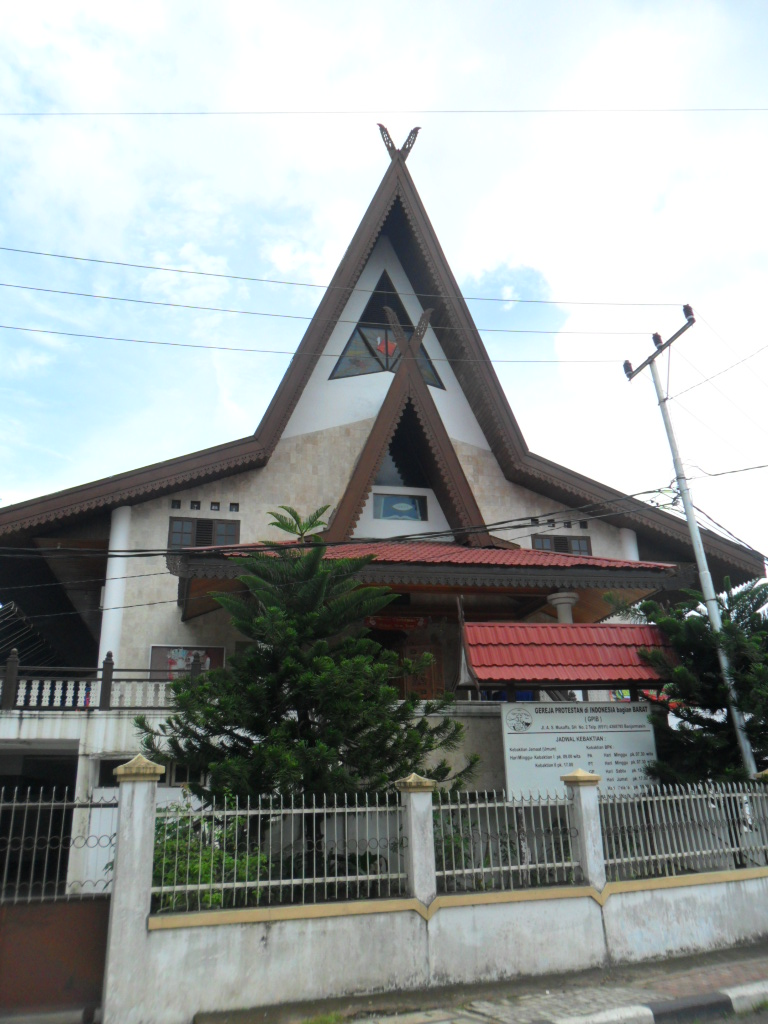
Protestant Church of Western Indonesia in Banjarmasin, South Kalimantan

The German Rhenish Missionary Society visited Banjarmasin and West Kalimantan in 1829. Following this two missionaries were sent in 1834, and in total between 1834 and 1859 20 missionaries were sent to the region, although mortality rates were high and never more than 7 were active at one time. Permission for the activity from the Dutch government was obtained after 1836.

Although the mission was headquartered in Banjarmasin, where the pastoral needs of European residents were supplied, it was apparent that converting the Muslims who dominate the cities of Kalimantan was an impossible task, and instead, efforts were focused on the Dayak people of the interior, who practised traditional religions. Johann Becker, a capable linguist, translated the gospels into the Dayak Ngaju language.

The missionaries also bought 1,100 Dayak slaves over the period 1836 to 1859 to emancipate them as free men. Despite their efforts, only a few hundred were baptised. In 1859 the Banjarmasin War broke out, several missionaries were killed, and the mission was excluded from the region until 1866 by the Dutch, which fought to bring the former Sultanate of Banjarmasin under direct rule.

In 1866 the missionaries returned. Despite building many mission stations and schools, only 3,000 had converted by 1911, as against 100,000 Batak Christians in the similarly resourced Rhenish mission of North Sumatra. It has been suggested that this slow progress was due to the fragmented nature of the Dayaks—with no king or dominant regional powers, there was little prospect of mass conversion, while new converts faced exclusion from their traditional ceremonies.

After World War I, the RMS was replaced by the Basel Mission. It transferred control to the first independent church, the 'Gereja Dayak Evangelis', in 1935, covering a vast geographical area from Banjarmasin 1,300 km to the west and 600 km inland. In 1950 the church became the more ethnically inclusive 'Gereja Kalimantan Evangelis' (GKE) as transmigrants from other parts of Indonesia to Kalimantan joined the congregation. The church has approximately 250,000 members, and is based in Central Kalimantan.

==== Catholic Church ====
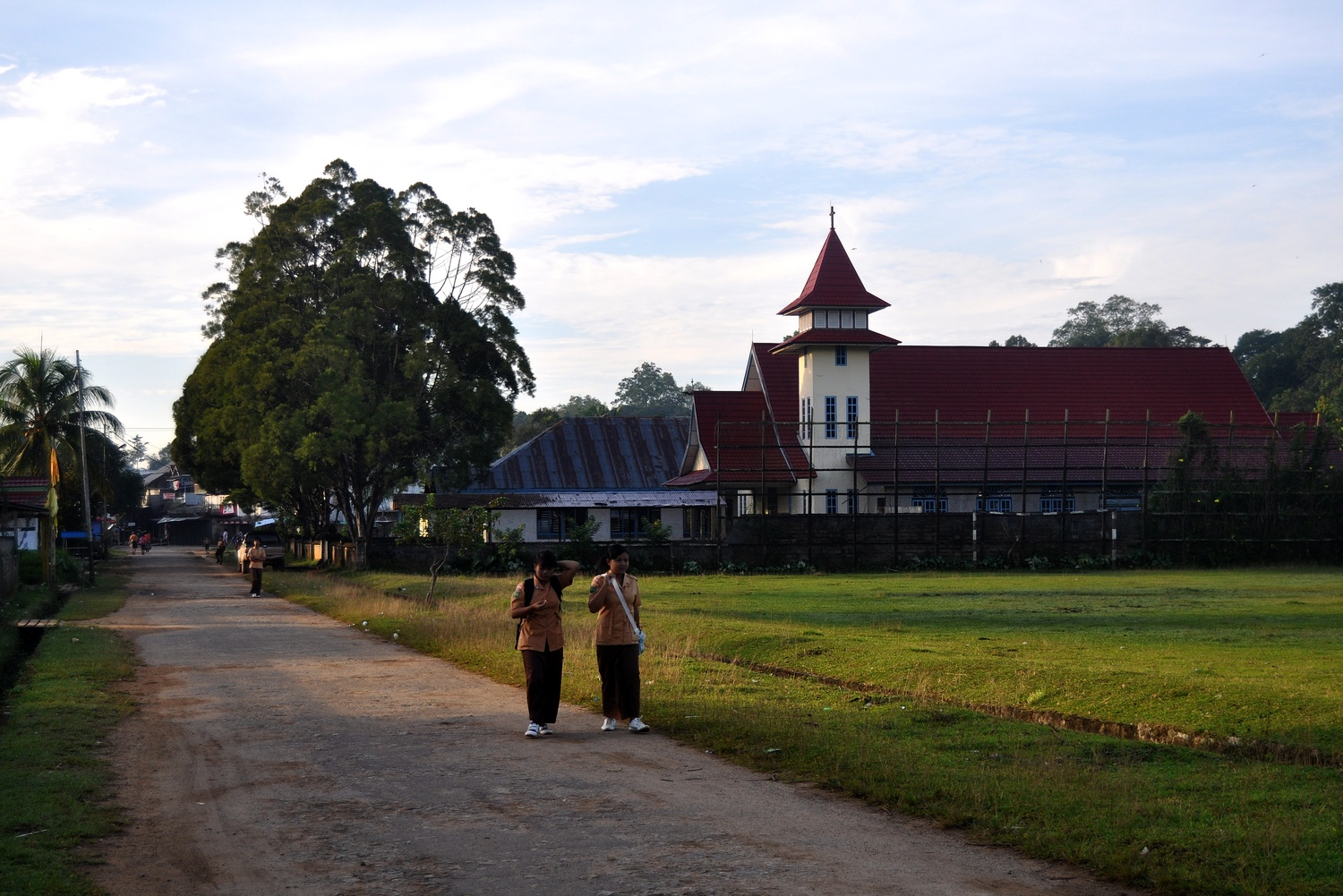
Catholic church in Tumbang Titi in Ketapang, West Kalimantan

The Vatican agreed a Concordat with the Dutch in 1847 that Kalimantan was a possible mission area, provided they did not settle on rivers where other missionaries were already active.

Chinese, historically a major force in West Kalimantan, included among their number some Catholics, who had migrated from other parts of the region. The first church was consecrated in Singkawang in 1876, and from here in 1885 the post was established as a pastoral centre for the Jesuit priest who would be responsible for the area. A mission to the Dayaks of Sejiram was established in 1890, and a church constructed. The Singkawang and Sejiram missions closed in 1896 and 1898, respectively, due to a lack of personnel.

The mission was re-established in Singkawang with Capuchin Friars in 1905. The first new missions (1905–1913) were aimed at the coastal Chinese of Pamangkat, Pontianak (location of West Kalimantan's Bishop, as it was the largest town in the region) and Sambas, as well as the deep Dayak interior, where the Catholics hoped to convert without competition from Islam, before working back towards the coast.

The Catholic training centre was established at Nyarumkop, close to Singkawang, where children (mostly Dayak, as the Chinese were less inclined towards Catholicism in West Kalimantan than in other parts of Indonesia – in 1980 only 3% of Chinese in West Kalimantan were Catholics) were educated and Catholic teachers trained. Catholic growth prior to World War Two was slow, but subsequently saw some success, most notably after 1965 and the New Order (Indonesia), where all Indonesians were required to proclaim an approved religion. Growth in the Catholic population from 1950 to 2000 in the Roman Catholic Archdiocese of Pontianak was from 1.1% to 8.7%, in the Roman Catholic Diocese of Sintang from 1.7% to 20.1%. In the Roman Catholic Diocese of Sanggau, just over 50% of the population are now Catholic, while in the Roman Catholic Diocese of Ketapang it is around 20%. Catholic presence in East and South Kalimantan is much lower than the West Kalimantan Dioceses.

==== Christian and Missionary Alliance ====
Missionaries of the Christian and Missionary Alliance began one of several Indonesian missions in East Kalimantan in 1929 in the region of Kutai. George Fisk, the lead missionary, asked only that new converts accept Jesus as their saviour, unlike the Catholics, who required two years of teaching. The West Kalimantan mission, established in 1933 in Pontianak ventured up the Kapuas River, where they found existing Catholic converts, some of whom converted to Protestantism. The Catholics, however, had an advantage over the CAMA Protestants in that CAMA, but not the Catholics, prohibited the consumption of alcohol.

The CAMA mission acted quickly in establishing churches in the interior, obtaining the use of an aeroplane from CAMA, and became part of the Kemah Injil Gereja Masehi Indonesia, or Tabernacle Gospel Messianic Indonesian church.

In 1990 the church had 98,000 members in East Kalimantan, and 62,000 in West Kalimantan, making it the third-largest Christian denomination in Kalimantan after the Catholic Church and the GKE (Gereja Kalimantan Evangelis).

=== Bali ===
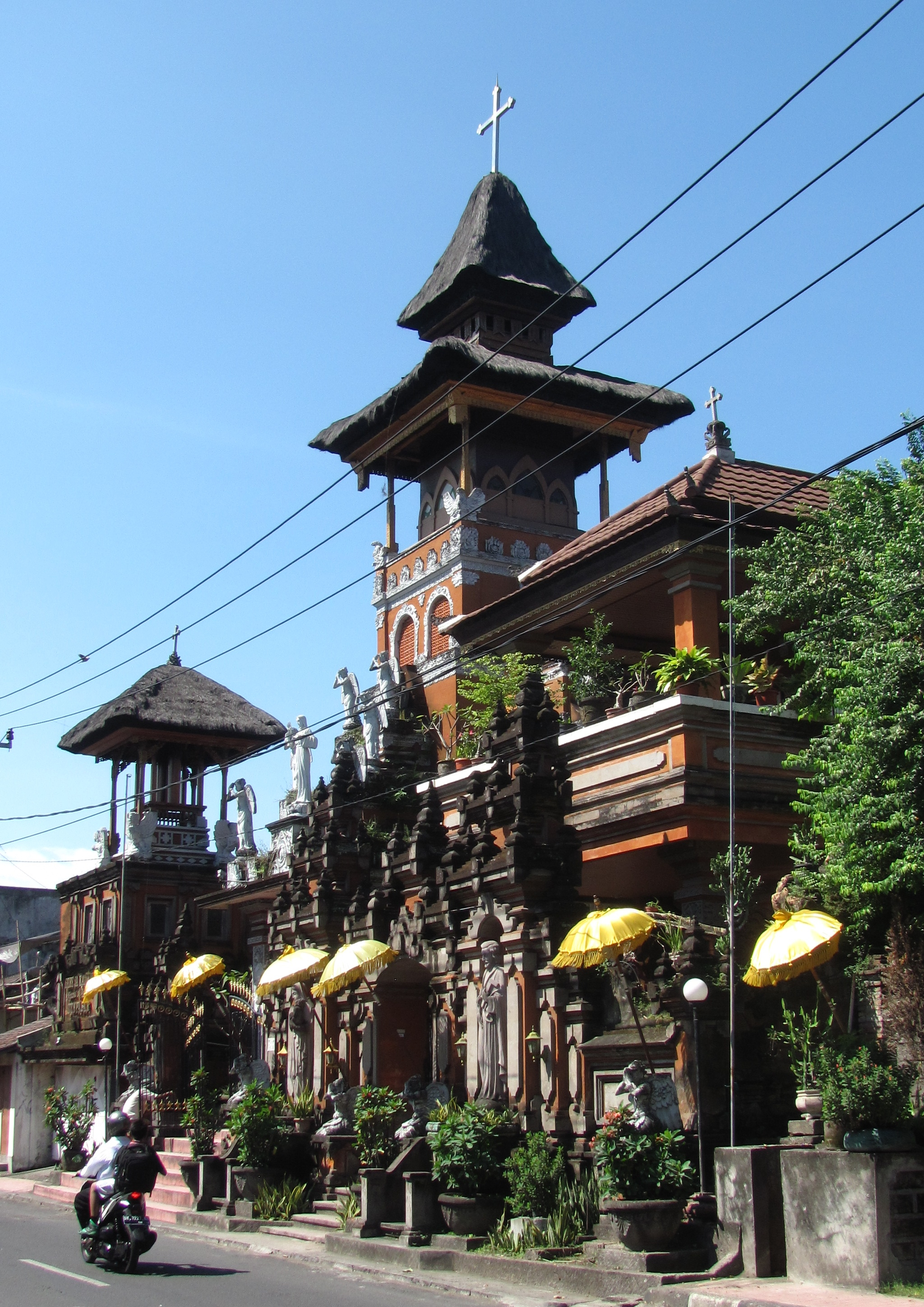
Saint Joseph's Catholic Church, Denpasar, Bali

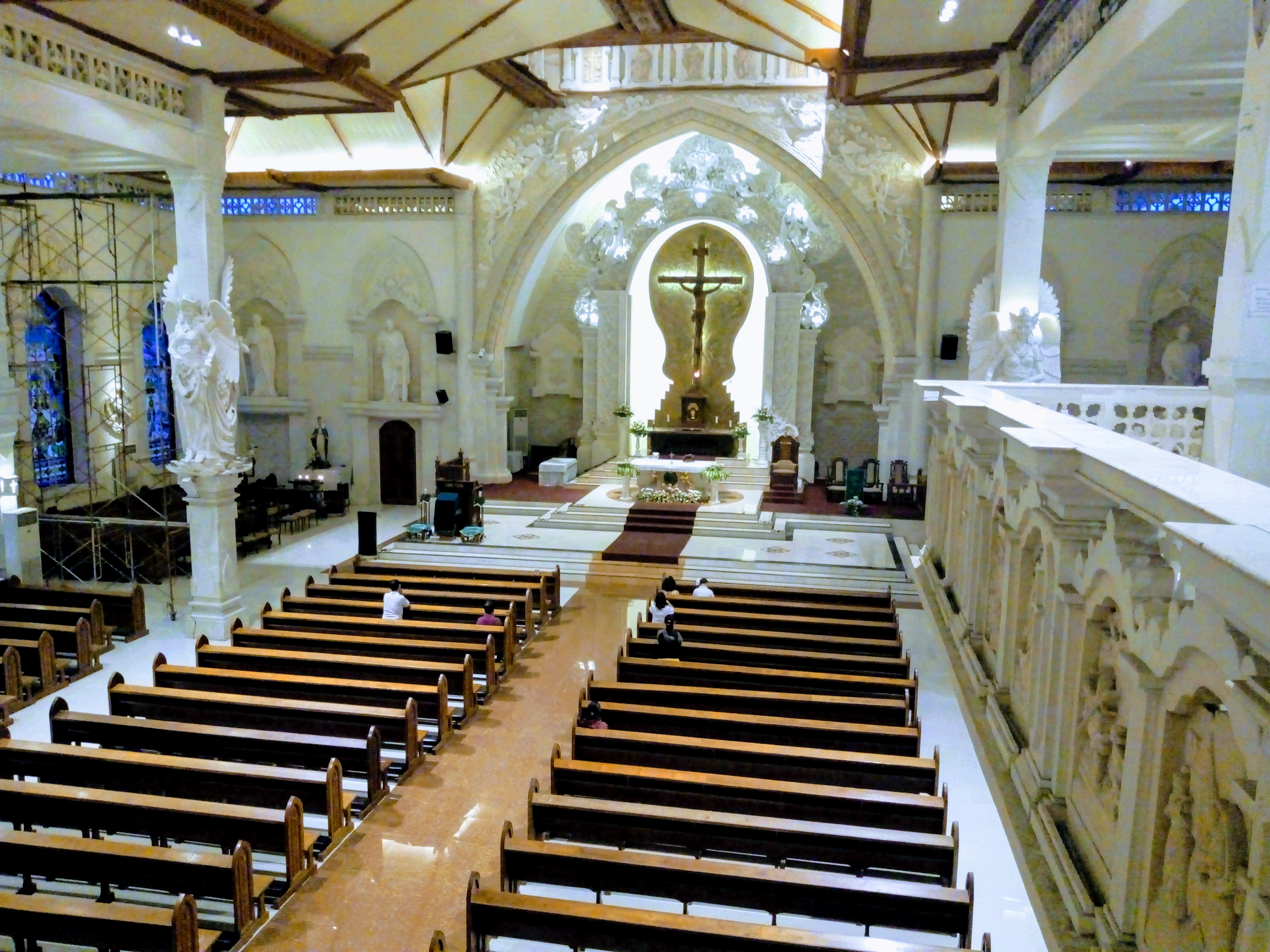
Holy Spirit Cathedral, Denpasar altar with Balinese architecture

Bali, unlike neighbouring Java, retained its Hindu culture when Islam came to the Indonesian archipelago, even gaining strength in this with the absorption of Javanese Hindus not wishing to convert to Islam. The Dutch began to build a presence on the island after 1846 in Singaraja, subduing it entirely in 1908. Three missionaries from the Protestant Utrecht Mission Society began work around Singaraja in 1864. Only one Balinese was baptised, and in 1881 following a disagreement, he conspired to have one of the missionaries murdered.

Subsequently, the Dutch government forbade further missionary activity, wishing to avoid further such disruption. In 1930, a Chinese-speaking missionary from CAMA (see also above) obtained permission to work in Bali, to serve the needs of Chinese Christians. Several hundred native Balinese decided to convert. The reaction of the Hindu Balinese to the missionary's edicts – to destroy idols and temples as being of the devil – was hostile: the Christian converts had their rice fields sabotaged and they were expelled from their villages. As a result, the Dutch again withdrew permission to preach from foreign missionaries, as of 1933, on the basis that the missionary had not kept to the Chinese communities, but had also preached to the native Balinese.

A native Javanese missionary began work in Bali in 1933, and in 1937 the Dutch posted a minister to Denpasar of the Dutch 'Indische Kerk', catering for Europeans in the first instance, but also to the 1000+ Protestant Balinese, while a Catholic priest was posted to Denpasar in 1935, from where several hundred Balinese converts were made in several years.

A Dutch response to the hostility of the Balinese to Christian converts was to establish a Protestant village in Bali, that of Blimbingsari, in 1939. Palasari, its neighbour, a Catholic village, was established in 1940.

Blimbingsari village developed the Gereja Kristen Protestan Bali (GKPB), the Balinese Protestant church, which was established in 1948. In its early years, the GKPB and its antecedent followed the theology of Hendrik Kraemer in the Dutch Reformed tradition, explicitly rejecting most of Balinese culture as heathen and unchristian, disposing of gamelan orchestras in favour of Western arts. As a result, many Balinese Protestants left Bali, where they were largely excluded from everyday Balinese life to the extent that there are more GKPB members outside of Bali than within Bali.

In 1972 native Balinese I Wayan Mastra, who grew up in a Balinese Hindu family, but converted to Christianity while at a Christian school in Java, became head of the GKPB church and began a process of Balinisation. For instance, when the Blimbingsari church, a basic stone and wood building was destroyed by an earthquake in 1976, it was rebuilt in more Balinese pendopo style, with a garden with running water, traditional Balinese entrance and a semi-open aspect. Subsequent GKPB churches have followed a similar pattern. The Balinese Catholic church was from the beginning more open to Balinese traditions.

The Christian communities of Blimbingsari and Palasari are the core of Balinese Christianity, with the religion very much in a minority in the rest of the island.

=== East Nusa Tenggara ===
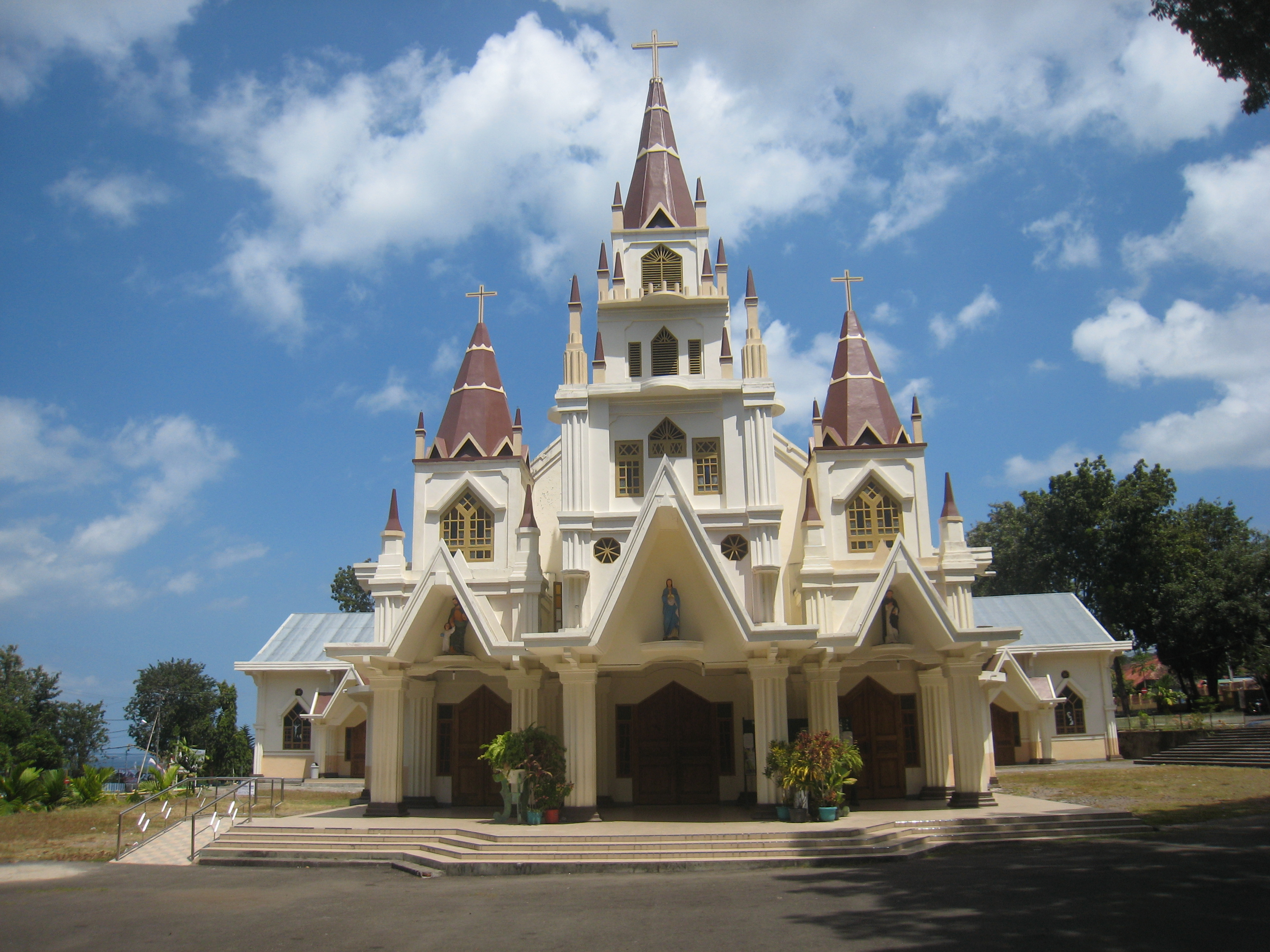
Cathedral of Larantuka, Flores

Portuguese traders ventured from Malacca to Timor to purchase sandalwood. During their trading missions they were frequently becalmed, and during this time are said to have converted numerous people of Solor island, Timor and Flores. Hearing of these conversions, three Dominican missionaries were sent from Malacca, arriving and establishing a church in 1562 in Flores. The mission was given financial support from the Portuguese in Goa, enabling the construction of mission stations in the area.

A major setback came when two headmen were imprisoned and mistreated by the Portuguese in 1598, resulting in a rebellion and desecration of churches throughout the region, as those opposed to the Portuguese, many of whom had been previously converted to Islam in the early 16th century, attacked the Portuguese and the Dominican mission. Subsequent setbacks came in the form of the arrival of the Dutch, who allied against the Portuguese Christians.

A new mission was established in 1617, which successfully furthered the spread of Catholicism in the region, including minor military ventures led from Larantuka on Flores, rejecting the dominions of Islamic Makassar. 'Black' Portuguese control over Larantuka, and influence also over Timor, was settled by a truce with the Dutch in 1661. The Catholic community in east Flores was strengthened by the expulsion of Catholics from Makassar in 1660. In Portuguese Timor the Portuguese mission at Lifau (which supported the nominal cathedral of the Diocese of Malacca, as the Dutch would no longer tolerate one there) was in conflict with the Dutch at Kupang, and wars were fought between the two sides with Catholic villages regarded as Portuguese and therefore enemies of the Dutch. In the first half of the 18th century 'Portuguese'-supporting factions were defeated entirely by the Dutch in West Timor, confining Catholicism to the eastern part of that island.

The Dominican mission declined in the late 18th century, and in 1817 the last priest covering Flores died. Many Catholics reverted to pagan practices, but still, thousands remained, continuing to follow Catholic pageantry. Portugal, severely weakened, withdrew from all but East Timor, but thanks to treaties signed in the 1850s, freedom of religion were guaranteed in areas being exchanged between the two countries. Following this treaty Catholicism strengthened considerably in Flores after 1860. In the western part of Flores, Dutch effective control over the area since 1907 led to the support of the spread of Catholicism among the Manggarai.

=== Sulawesi ===
==== Southern Sulawesi ====
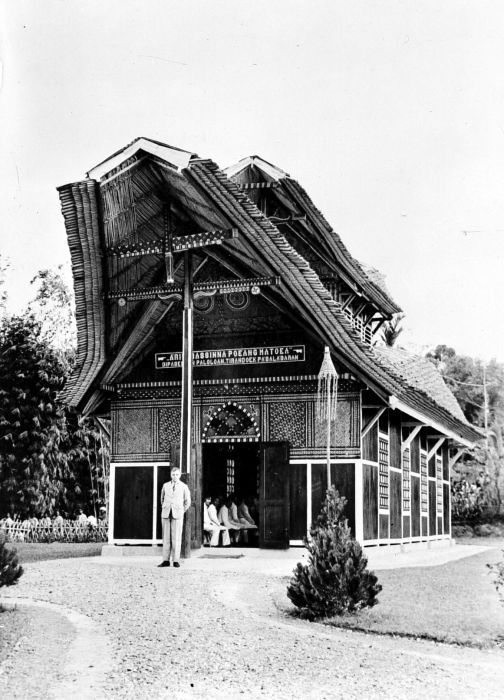
Torajan church

The leaders of Makassar in southern Sulawesi expressed an interest in Christianity on several occasions in the 16th century, and while a request was made to Malacca for missionaries, none were forthcoming, perhaps because of the lack of commercial opportunities (spices) in the area. Initially reluctant towards Islam (which according to a contemporary Portuguese observer was partly due to a heavy reliance on pork meat in the basic diet), from 1605 the area converted to Islam, having received instruction in the faith from merchants from Johor who were rivals of the Portuguese. Subsequently, following the fall of Portuguese Malacca, many Catholics, including Jesuit priests, fled to Makassar, which was tolerant of their faith, but by 1660 the Dutch forced the expulsion of the Portuguese, who fled to Macau and Flores.

==== Northern Sulawesi ====
The Portuguese baptised over a thousand in Manado, where the Portuguese, and Christianity, were seen as a bulwark against the powerful Ternate Sultanate directly due east. Portuguese missionary activity continued in northern Sulawesi between 1563 and 1570, but following the murder of Sultan Hairun in Ternate and the ensuing anti-Portuguese attacks, the mission was abandoned.

In the Spanish-controlled Sangihe Islands and Talaud Islands in the Kingdom of Siau, lying directly north of northern Sulawesi, Catholicism had been adopted with some enthusiasm, and when the allied Dutch-Ternatean Muslim pillaged the islands in 1613 and 1615, help was sought from the Philippines to the north. Franciscans visited from Manila, as did a Jesuit mission.

Jesuit missionaries were also active in Minahasa and neighbouring areas in the first half of the 17th century, but attacks from Muslims from Ternate as well as local animist peoples meant that priests had a short life expectancy. From 1655 to 1676 the Dutch established firm control of northern Sulawesi, and Catholicism was prohibited by the ruling VOC. With Catholicism harshly suppressed, as in Ambon in Maluku, the people of Minahasa, the Sangihe and Talaud islands are to this day almost entirely Protestant (the Dutch replacing the Catholic infrastructure with the schools of Dutch Protestantism), although in the 20th century fresh Catholic mission activity commenced.

=== Maluku ===
While the Portuguese religious influence over Malacca and Sumatra was very small, their mission to Maluku, the important spice islands of the eastern archipelago, was more significant. They landed first in Ambon, where the natives were already polarised into 'uli-lima' (group of five) and 'uli-siwa' (group of nine), the former having converted to Islam and allying with the Muslim Javanese, with the latter retaining traditional beliefs. The Portuguese found themselves allied with the ulu-siwa, whose opposition to the uli-lima made Christianity an appealing choice.

The Islamic Sultanate of Ternate sought the patronage of the Portuguese, offering a trading monopoly in return for military support against rival local kingdoms. In 1534, the first Catholic community was established in Halmahera, the result of an appeal to the Portuguese for protection from Halmahera against Ternatean incursions—protection offered on condition of converting to Christianity.

Further evangelising resulted in many Ternate nobles converting to Christianity, while Francis Xavier, a Catholic missionary and co-founder of the Jesuit Order worked in Ternate, Moro and Ambon briefly in 1546 and also 1547. St Francis wrote that most of the population were 'pagan', and hated the local Muslims, resisting conversion to Islam. He appealed for support to save souls in Maluku, which arrived in 1547 in the shape of Nuno Ribeiro, a Jesuit who is said to have converted five hundred people before being murdered in 1549.

Sultan Hairun of Ternate had refused to convert to Christianity, regarding himself as a defender of the Islamic faith, and when he was murdered by a Portuguese Captain in 1570, his son, Baabullah, the new Sultan, reacted angrily, expelling the Portuguese from Maluku, waging war against both the Portuguese and their local Christian allies. As a result, the Jesuit mission was abandoned almost entirely in 1573, and Christians were killed or converted at the point of a sword. The faith survived only around the Jesuit fort in Ambon; even there, there was a shortage of priests due to dangerous conditions, and many local people did not have knowledge of Christian creeds and were easily apostatised to Islam or traditional beliefs.

The Portuguese by now largely impotent, the Dutch, allied with the Muslim locals against their mutual Portuguese enemy, seized the fort of Ambon in 1605. The Dutch expelled the Jesuits and Portuguese, adopting the Catholic churches for Protestant worship, which was supported through the establishment of numerous Protestant schools, where the teachers also led Sunday worship. Boundaries between Muslim and Christians were well-established on Ambon, but in Seram and Buru, proselytisation took place converting 'pagans' to Christianity, the policy of the VOC being to contain the spread of Islam without converting existing Muslims. Idols were destroyed by the Dutch teachers as new Christians were prohibited from continuing to follow their traditional religion.

=== Papua ===
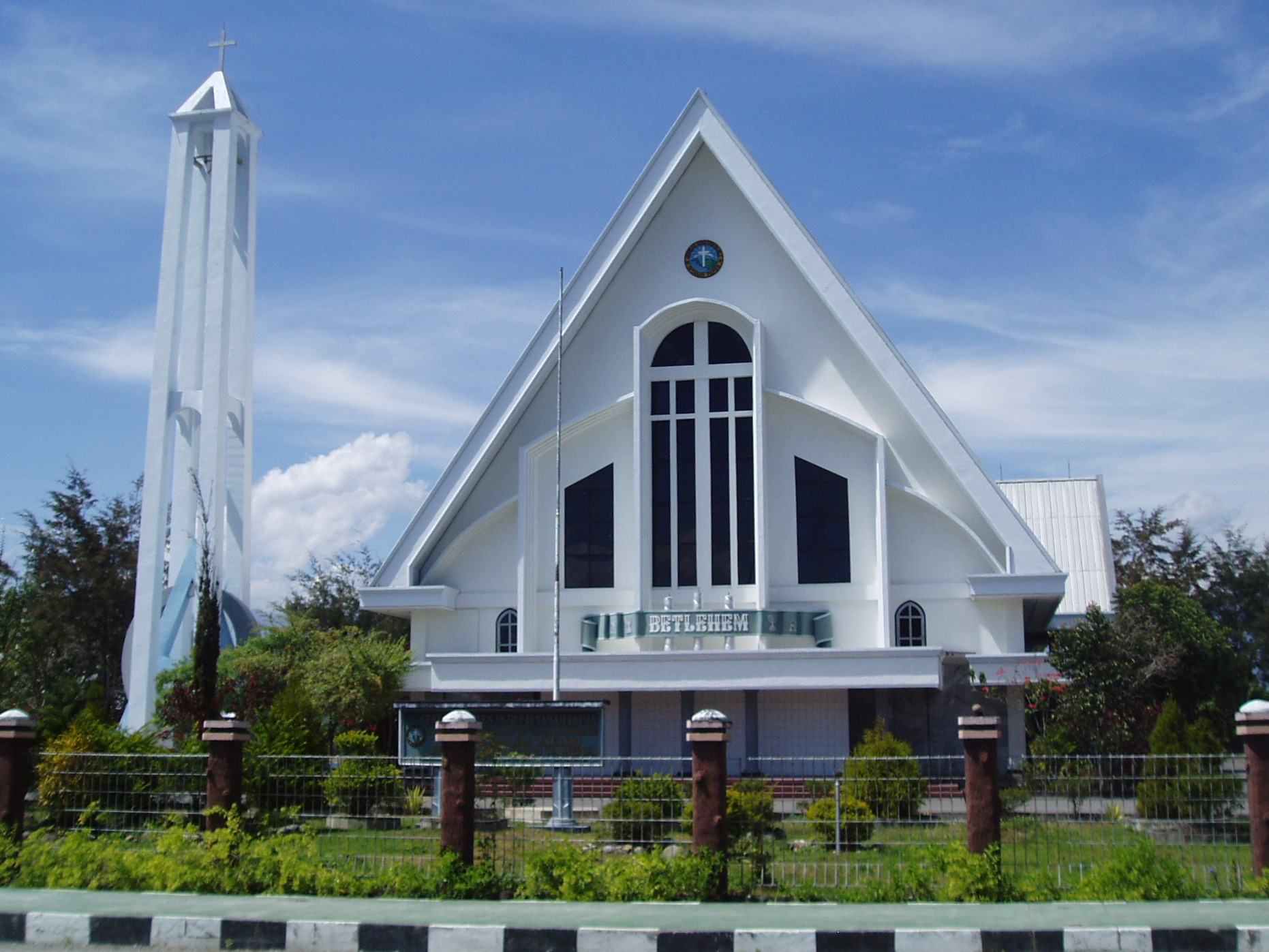
Betlehem church in Wamena, Papua.

Papua, unlike the rest of Indonesia, has had little historic contact with Muslim preachers, and had its first Christian missionary contact in 1855. With little competition, the mission was relatively successful. Missionaries Carl Ottow and Johann Geisler, under the initiative of Ottho Gerhard Heldring, entered Papua at Mansinam island, near Manokwari on 5 February 1855, and are said to have knelt on the beach and prayed, claiming Papua for Christ. Since 2001, the fifth of February has been a Papuan public holiday, recognising this first landing.

Ottow and Geisler studied the Numfor language, and were subsequently granted a monthly stipend by the Dutch government. The missionaries proposed a scheme to start a tobacco plantation using Christian Javanese to train the Papuans and were given 5,000 guilders by the Dutch and two Christian Javanese tobacco farmers. The Dutch administrators perceived the missionaries activities as a cut-price means of colonisation, while the missionaries themselves made profits from trading Papuan goods. The Utrecht Mission Society (UZV) joined the mission in 1863; they were prohibited from trade, and instead established a trading committee.

The UZV established a Christian-based education system as well as regular church services. Initially, the Papuans' attendance was encouraged using bribes of betel nut and tobacco, but subsequently, this was stopped. In addition, slaves were bought to be raised as stepchildren and then freed. By 1880, only 20 Papuans had been baptised, including many freed slaves.

The Dutch government established posts in Netherlands New Guinea in 1898, a move welcomed by the missionaries, who saw orderly Dutch rule as the essential antidote to Papua paganism. Subsequently, the UZV mission had more success, with a mass conversion near Cenderawasih Bay in 1907 and the evangelisation of the Sentani people by Pamai, a native Papuan in the late 1920s. Due to the Great Depression, the mission suffered a funding shortfall and switched to native evangelists, who had the advantage of speaking the local language (rather than Malay) but were often poorly trained. The mission extended in the 1930s to Yos Sudarso Bay, and the UZV mission by 1934 had over 50,000 Christians, 90% of them in North Papua, the remainder in West Papua. By 1942 the mission had expanded to 300 schools in 300 congregations.

The first Catholic presence in Papua was in Fakfak, a Jesuit mission in 1894. In 1902 the Vicariate of Netherlands New Guinea was established. Despite the earlier activity in Fakfak, the Dutch restricted the Catholic Church to the southern part of the island, where they were active especially around Merauke. The mission campaigned against promiscuity and the destructive practices of headhunting among the Marind-anim. Following the 1918 flu pandemic, which killed one in five in the area, the Dutch government agreed to the establishment of model villages, based on European conditions, including wearing European clothes, but which the people would submit to only by violence.

In 1925 the Catholics sought to re-establish their mission in Fakfak; permission was granted in 1927. This brought the Catholics into conflict with the Protestants in North Papua, who suggested expanding to South Papua in retaliation. The Catholics and Protestants also began a race for the highlands.

After World War Two, New Guinea remained outside of Indonesian control, under the Dutch administration, but in 1963, it was absorbed under dubious circumstances into Indonesia. The Indonesians were suspicious of 'Dutch' elements, which included church teachers and missionaries, who had been educated in Dutch fashion and began an overnight Indonesianisation. Papua acquired a significant population of mostly Muslim transmigrants, who were given land and a house by the Indonesian government. Religious differences, as well as culture with the Muslim Indonesian army and administrators, have exacerbated the Papua conflict, in which thousands of Papuans have been killed by Indonesian security forces. Some human rights groups like the IWGIA estimate the number of killed Papuans to be over 100,000. The majority of government resources were directed to non-Papuan Muslims rather than Papuan Christians, and non-Papuan Muslims were also given senior administrative roles. Church leaders, suspected of Papuan nationalism, were strictly monitored and in many cases killed where they strayed too close to Papuan separatist movements.

=== The 19th century ===
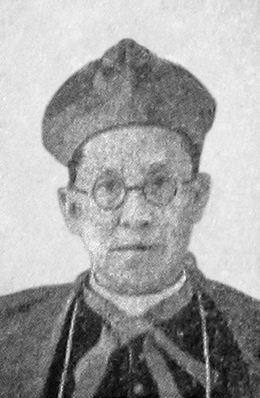
Albertus Soegijapranata, a national hero of Indonesia, an ex-Muslim, was the first native Indonesian bishop and known for his pro-nationalistic stance, often expressed as "100% Catholic, 100% Indonesian".

After the collapse of the VOC and defeat by the English, the Indies were eventually restored to the Dutch in 1815. By this time the separation of church and state had been established in The Netherlands. This meant that the presence of a Protestant monopoly in the Indies was abandoned, and in 1826 the Apostolic Prefecture of Batavia was established.

As of 1800, there were an estimated 40,000 indigenous Protestants, in northern Sulawesi, central Maluku and Timor, as well as approximately 11,000 Catholics in east Flores and the islands around. This out of a population of a total 7 million represented just 0.7% Christians, against approximately 85% Muslims. Thus it can be seen that in the last two centuries although the proportion of Muslims has remained largely constant in the archipelago, the Christian population has risen rapidly, thanks in large part to the 19th-century missionary societies, discussed below.

=== The 20th century ===
In 1941, there were 1.7 million Protestants and 600.000 Catholics in a population of 60 million.

According to the World Christian Encyclopedia, between 1965 and 1985 about 2.5 million Indonesians converted from Islam to Christianity. However, these statistics have been questioned and should be viewed in context. In the 1960s due to anti-Communist and anti-Confucian legislation, many Communists and Chinese identified as Christians. Later, many Chinese Indonesian identified as Christian when the government discontinued recognition of Confucianism as an accepted religion.

According to the Ministry of Religious Affairs, 69,703 Christian churches operated throughout Indonesia in 2014. The 2006 joint ministerial decree provided Islamic groups with leverage to force closure of, or receive protection money from, churches without permits even if established before the decree. The Indonesian government failed to enforce the Supreme Court decisions permitting churches in Java to reopen.

The Indonesian Orthodox Church (Old Calendarist) was founded in 1991, initially affiliated with the mainstream Eastern Orthodox Church. Beginning in 1996, it was affiliated with the Metropolis of Hong Kong and Southeast Asia. In 2019, however, it split from mainstream Orthodoxy, affiliating with the Old Calendarist Genuine Greek Orthodox Church. In response, both the Moscow Patriarchate and the Ecumenical Patriarchate founded new churches across the archipelago to receive those who were not willing to go along with the move.

== Violence and discrimination against Christians ==
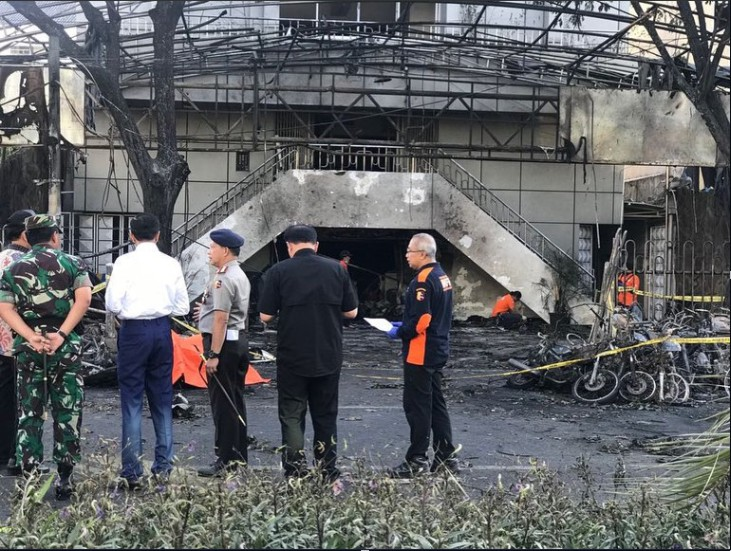
Indonesian President Joko Widodo, Indonesian National Police and Indonesian National Armed Forces officer checked the aftermath of the multiple suicide bombings in Surabaya.

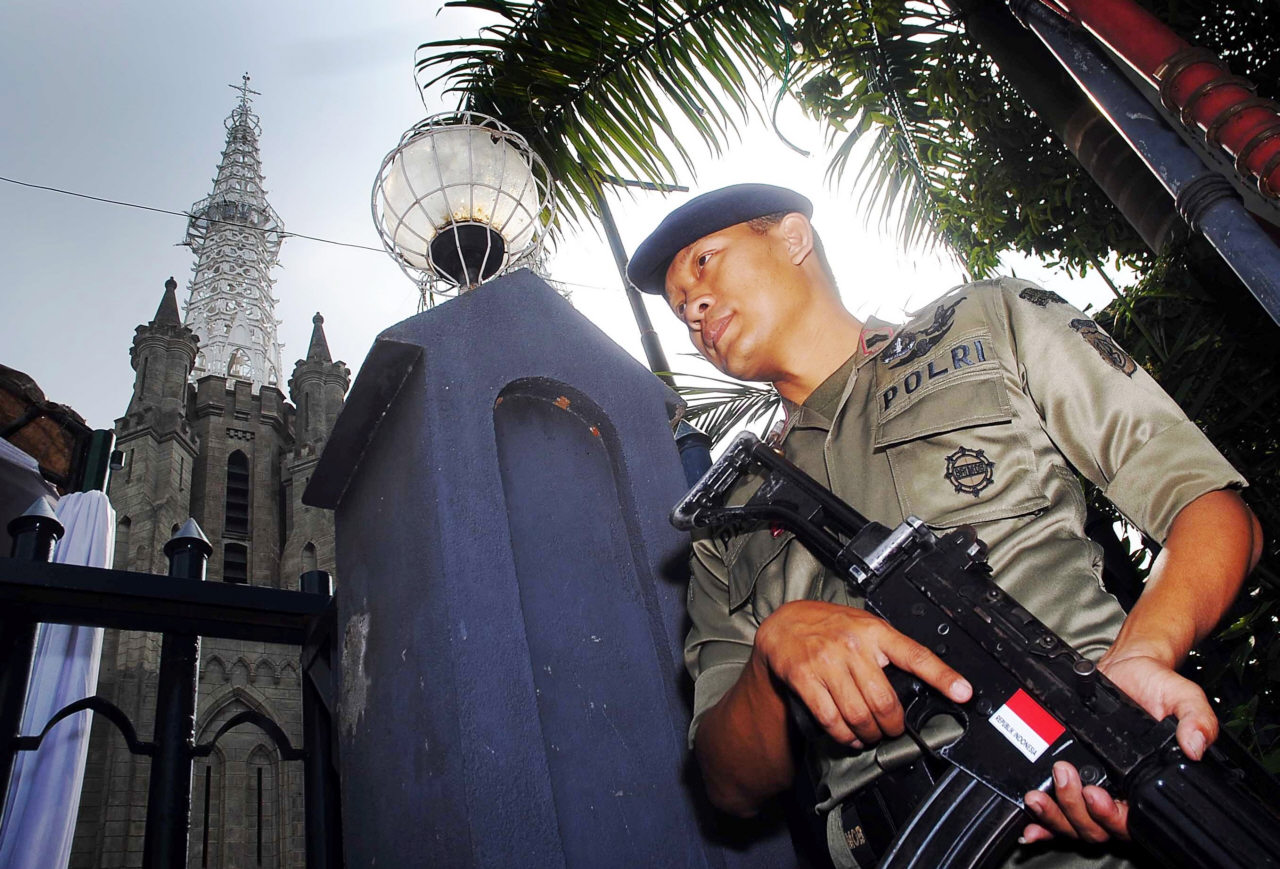
A Mobile Brigade Corps officer guarding outside the Jakarta Cathedral during a Christian celebration.

Forced circumcisions and forced conversions of Christians occurred during the 1999–2002 Muslim-Christian conflict in Maluku, along with attacks on churches throughout Indonesia. The army, especially the special forces unit Kopassus, was accused of aiding the attacks in Maluku, and the official response to these attacks was lacking, while the full force of the law was used against those Christians involved in revenge attacks. The 2006 execution of three Catholic citizens in Sulawesi nurtured further fears that the Indonesian state favoured Muslims while penalising the Christian minority.

Even after the subsiding of the Maluku conflict, Christians are victims of minor, but regular, attacks by radical Muslim organisations such as the Islamic Defenders Front (FPI). In 2005, Indonesians were shocked by the beheadings of three Christian schoolgirls, perpetrated by Muslim extremists in Sulawesi.

On 8 February 2011, trial spectators attacked the defendant, prosecutors and judges, and Muslim rioters severely vandalised Protestant and Catholic churches, schools, and other property in Temanggung, Central Java in protest that prosecutors only demanded that the court sentence Antonius Bawengan to five years in prison (the maximum sentence permitted by law) for his alleged blasphemy against Islam via distributed leaflets. A local Muslim cleric allegedly demanded that Antonius receive the death penalty. The judge immediately sentenced Antonius to five years in prison. Local Muslim residents reportedly protected a Catholic priest and tried to minimise damage. The local Muslim cleric later received a one-year sentence for inciting the Temanggung riot. The Temanggung riot occurred two days after 1,500 Sunni Muslims attacked Ahmadiyya Muslims in Cikeusik, Banten, murdering three.

On the other hand, and also in February 2011, a local FPI leader and followers each received at most a 5½-month sentence and were released based on time served after members of the group struck a Batak Christian Protestant Church (a.k.a. HKBP) pastor in the head with a wooden plank and stabbed a HKBP elder in the abdomen. The planned drive-by attack occurred in Bekasi, West Java while the victims were walking to a church service and related to local Muslims' objection to church construction. While local human rights activists expressed disappointment in the minimal sentences, no riots occurred. Earlier, in 2010, hundreds of FPI members had attacked congregants during an HKBP church service in Bekasi, beating many women. Police were on-site but provided little protection.

In August 2011, a group of Muslims attacked and burned three churches in Kuantan, Senggingi, and Riau province. The police refused to give any reason for the burnings. Communion of Churches in Indonesia (PGI) Center in Jakarta alleges it was because of regional elections dispute. Two suspects were apprehended.

A particular concern to non-Muslim religious organisations, a 2006 joint ministerial decree on houses of worship (signed by the Religious Affairs Ministry and Home Ministry) requires a religious group to obtain the approval of at least 60 households in the immediate vicinity before building a house of worship. This decree has been used frequently to prevent the construction of non-Muslim places of worship and has been cited by radical Muslim organisations for various attacks on non-Muslims.

On 9 May 2017, the Evangelicalism governor of Jakarta Basuki Tjahaja Purnama was sentenced to two years in prison by the North Jakarta District Court after being found guilty of committing a criminal act of blasphemy.

On 13 May 2018 three churches were the target of suicide bombings in Surabaya.

On 28 November 2020, about 10 people, allegedly from East Indonesia Mujahideen, killed four Christians and burning a Salvation Army post and Christians homes at Central Sulawesi, Indonesia. Three of the victims were killed by getting their throats slit, and the other victim was killed by beheading. On the other hand, Indonesian national police have denied that the attacks are religiously motivated, though the police vowed to begin pursuit of the perpetrators.

=== Diaspora ===
A number of Indonesian Christians have fled persecution since 1998 reformation riot, forming a sizable diaspora abroad, in countries including the United States.

In 2010, the U.S. Court of Appeals for the Ninth Circuit, for purposes of U.S. immigration law: "[T]he record compels a finding that Christians in Indonesia are a disfavored group". The definition of this term is "a group of individuals in a certain country or part of a country, all of whom share a common, protected characteristic, many of whom are mistreated, and a substantial number of whom are persecuted" but who are "not threatened by a pattern or practice of systematic persecution." The court blamed the rise of anti-Christian sentiment on Suharto consorting with militant Islamic groups in the 1990s in order to maintain his power, noting that he had "purged his cabinet and army of Christians and replaced them with fundamentalist Muslims", and adding that support and protection for violent Islamic militia such as Laskar Jihad by the military and political elite had continued since Suharto's exit from power. According to the ruling: "Christian churches throughout Indonesia have been burned, bombed, and vandalised by Muslim extremists. These attacks are often accompanied by threats, such as: 'God has no son. Jesus could not help you. Until doomsday, Muslims will not make peace with Christians. Death to all Christians.'"

== Christian population growth ==
Indonesia is home to the largest Christian community made up of converts from their former Islamic faith; according to various sources, since the mid and late 1960s, between 2 and 2.5 million Muslims have converted to Christianity.

There has been large historical growth of Christianity in Indonesia since the 19th century. In the early period, this related to historical missionary work, and in later periods, conversions from Chinese Buddhists and Islam, and population growth.

Both Protestant and Catholic missionaries were active in the 19th century, with conversions from tribal religions and Islam. Apart from Europeans in Indonesia, Non Europeans Catholics were numbered at 26,000 in 1900, however that number had grown to half a million by 1940. Non European Protestants had grown from 285,000 to 1.7 million in 1940. Both these figures together meant that Christians in 1940 were about 3% of the total population. By 2003, Protestants had grown to 16 milion and Catholics to 6 million, which was close to 10% of the total population. By 2023 numbers had grown slightly to 11% of the population, with 7.41% Protestant (20.8 million) and 3.06% Catholic (8.6 million).

According to the World Christian Encyclopedia, between 1965 and 1985 about 2.5 million Indonesian converted from Islam to Christianity. According to Believers in Christ from a Muslim Background: A Global Census study, between 1960 and 2015 about 6 million Indonesians of Muslim background converted to Christianity; however, this figure includes the descendants of converts.

Some reports also show that many of the Chinese Indonesian minority have converted to Christianity. Demographer Aris Ananta reported in 2008 that "anecdotal evidence suggests that more Buddhist Chinese have become Christians as they increased their standards of education" he says that "Christianity is often associated with 'modernity' and Western education. Buddhism is associated with Chinese traditional ways".

According to scholar Gavin W. Jones of Australian National University, "there has been a rapid growth in the number of Chinese Christians" in Indonesia, and "conversion of Chinese to Christianity accelerated in the 1960s, especially in East Java, and for Indonesia as a whole the proportion of Chinese who were Catholics rose from 2 percent in 1957 to 6 percent in 1969".

== See also ==
- Indonesian Orthodox Church
- Christmas in Indonesia
- Freedom of religion in Indonesia
- Buku Ende

== Bibliography ==
- Aritonang, Jan Sihar; Steenbrink, Karel Adriaan (2008). A History of Christianity in Indonesia. Studies in Christian mission, 35. Brill. ISBN 978-90-04-17026-1.
- Burgess, Stanley M.; Maas, Eduard M. van der, eds. (2002). "Indonesia". The New International Dictionary of Pentecostal and Charismatic Movements (Rev. and exp. ed.). Grand Rapids, Mi: Zondervan. pp. 126–32. ISBN 978-0-310-22481-5.
- Gonggong, Anhar (2012). Mgr. Albertus Soegijapranata SJ: Antara Gereja dan Negara [Mgr. Albertus Soegijapranata SJ: Between the Church and the State] (in Indonesian) (Revised ed.). Jakarta: Grasindo. ISBN 978-979-081-803-3.
- Hillerbrand, Hans J., ed. (2014) [2004]. "Indonesia". Encyclopedia of Protestantism. Vol. 2 (Reprint ed.). London; New York: Routledge. ISBN 978-0-415-92472-6. Archived from the original on 23 May 2020.
- Mandryk, Jason (2010). "Indonesia". Operation World: The Definitive Prayer Guide to Every Nation (7th rev. ed.). Downers Grove, Il: InterVarsity Press. ISBN 978-0-8308-5724-1.
