= Freedom of religion in Indonesia =

The Indonesian constitution provides some degree of freedom of religion. The government generally respects religious freedom for the six officially recognized religions (Islam, Protestantism, Catholicism, Hinduism, Buddhism, Confucianism) and/or folk religion. All religions have equal rights according to the Indonesian laws.

== Religious demography ==
According to 2025 government data, 87.15% of the population is Muslim, 7.37% Protestant, 3.07% Catholic, 1.66% Hindu, and 0.75% follow Buddhism, Confucianism, or indigenous beliefs. Most Muslims in the country are Sunni. The two largest religious social organizations, Nahdlatul Ulama and Muhammadiyah, claimed 40 million and 30 million Sunni followers, respectively. The third largest religious social organization is the Batak Christian Protestant Church, with around 4.5 million followers. There are also an estimated one million to three million Shia Muslims.

== Legal framework ==
Article 29 of the 1945 constitution provides for freedom of religion, accords "all persons the right to worship according to their own religion or belief," and states that "the nation is based upon belief in one supreme God." The first tenet of the country's national ideology, Pancasila, similarly declares belief in one God. The government does not allow for not believing in God. Government employees must swear allegiance to the nation and to the Pancasila ideology. Other policies placed restrictions on certain types of religious activity, particularly among unrecognized religious groups and "deviant" sects of recognized religious groups.

Aceh remained the only province authorized by the central government to implement Islamic law (Shari'a), and non-Muslims in the province remained exempt from Shari'a. Aceh adopted a Shari'a based penal code imposing physical punishment for violations.

The Ministry of Religious Affairs extends official status to six religious groups: Islam, Catholicism, Protestantism, Buddhism, Hinduism, and Confucianism. Unrecognized groups may register with the Ministry of Culture and Tourism as social organizations. Although these groups have the right to establish a house of worship, obtain identity cards, and register marriages and births, they sometimes face administrative difficulties in doing so. In some cases these challenges make it more difficult for individuals to find jobs or enroll children in school. Legally, identity card applications are now acceptable when the "religion" section is left blank; however, members of some groups reported that they sometimes faced obstacles.

The three decades long ban on freedom to organize was lifted from the Baháʼí Faith the year 2000, but the Baháʼí believers are not allowed to have outreach activities and must organize their meetings only within the Baháʼí community. Baháʼí is tolerated, but it is understood that it may not expand. Activities such as door to door transmission, events open for non-Baháʼís and spreading of brochures are forbidden. The website has repeatedly been switched off, and the Baháʼí center in Jakarta was abandoned during most of 2013 and 2014

== Conflicts over minority houses of worship ==
The 2006 Revised Joint Ministerial Decrees on Construction of Houses of Worship, which has been criticized as unconstitutional, requires any group attempting to build a house of worship to obtain signatures from 90 potential members, 60 households of a different faith, and various local authorities.

Amnesty International reports that the Ahmadiyya community is increasingly targeted and at least four provinces issued new regional regulations restricting Ahmadiyya activities. By the end of 2011, at least 18 Christian churches had been attacked or forced to shut down. In addition, Shi'a Muslims are at increased risk of attack and are being pressured by anti-Shi'a groups to convert to Sunni Islam.

In addition to the Ahmadiyya, according to the Indonesian Communion of Churches and the Wahid Institute, local government officials and local communities forced the closing of at least 28 licensed and unlicensed churches in 2010. Many of the targeted churches operated in private homes and storefronts, and some churches moved their services to rented spaces in public shopping malls to lessen the potential of threats from hardline groups.

Examples of clashes:

- On the morning of 22 April 2012, around 100 members of the Filadelfia Batak Christian Protestant Church (HKBP) were prevented from going to their church to conduct the Sunday service. They were blocked by officers from the Bekasi municipal administrative police (Satpol PP), North Tambun sub-district police and other local government officials, who tried to persuade them to move to a place around nine kilometres away. Unable to access the church, the congregation began to conduct their service by the road. Around 500 protestors who had gathered earlier near the church surrounded them, began threatening them and demanded that they leave. Some apparently tried to attack the worshippers, but were blocked by the police. The protestors only dispersed after more police officers arrived, and a municipal administrative police officer fired a shot in the air. The previous Sunday, protestors had also blocked congregation members from getting to the church, forcing them to worship by the road. Instead of dispersing or detaining the protestors who were threatening the congregation, the police tried to pressure the worshippers to leave the area. After the service, one of protestors threatened the church leader, saying, "You're finished if you try coming back!" Members of the congregation fear that without adequate police protection, they will be intimidated and attacked at future Sunday services.
- Taman Yasmin Indonesian Christian Church in Bogor, a majority-Muslim area, started a lengthy permitting process for their church in 2003, obtaining all the needed permission. Under popular pressure, local authorities froze the permits. The congregation appealed all the way to the Supreme Court of Indonesia and won in 2011. Local authorities complied with the ruling to unfreeze the permits, but then cancelled them entirely. The partially completed building has been sealed by local authorities and declared off-limits. The group celebrated a secret Christmas ceremony in 2010, but in general since 2008 has been forced to hold weekly services on the pavement outside the church. One service, on 22 January 2012, was disrupted by two groups - the Islamic Reform Movement and the Muslim Communications Forum - who held a protest, shouted at the Christian group, blocked the road with tree branches and wooden chairs, and eventually forced the group to leave under police protection.
- In 2015, about 8,000 Christians fled Aceh province when a Muslim mob torched a church; authorities later agreed to demolish 10 churches without permits.
- Ahmadiyya mosques have been closed in various areas using the 2006 law, with Sunni Muslims complaining the group is heretical and should not be claiming to be practice Islam.

== Ahmadiyya community ==
A 2008 government decree bans both proselytizing by the Ahmadi Muslim community and vigilantism against the Ahmadiyya; in 2022, the government announced it would look at changes to this ban.

In 2010, controversy over the Ahmadiyya continued with hardline groups renewing attacks and demanding that the government disband the Ahmadiyya. Rallies continued throughout the country both for and against a ban. Civil rights activists, members of the Presidential Advisory Council, and leaders from Muhammadiyah and Nadhlatul Ulama continued to assert that any such ban would be unconstitutional and contrary to the principles of Islam.

In 2022, the Ahmadiyya community constructed six new mosques; they also completed the rebuilding of the Miftahul Huda Mosque in Kalimantan, which had been destroyed by a mob in September 2021.

== Suppression of Shi'a ==
Tajul Muluk, a Shi'a Muslim religious leader from East Java, was sentenced on 12 July 2012, to two years' imprisonment for blasphemy by the Sampang District Court in Sampang Regency, East Java's Madura island. Tajul Muluk was displaced with over 300 other Shi'a villagers on 29 December 2011, when an anti-Shi'a mob of some 500 people attacked and burned houses, a boarding school and a Shi'a place of worship in Nangkernang village, Sampang. Only one person was charged and sentenced to three months’ imprisonment for the attacks. Afterwards most of the Shi'a displaced by the attack returned to Nangkrenang village. But Tajul Muluk and about 20 other villagers, including his family, were prevented from returning to the village by the attackers, who reportedly threatened to kill them if they returned, and by the police.

On 1 January 2012 a religious decree (fatwa) was issued by the Sampang branch of the Indonesian Ulema Council (MUI) about what they described as Tajul Muluk's "deviant teachings", and two days later a police report was filed against him. On 16 March, the East Java regional police charged Tajul Muluk with blasphemy under Article 156(a) of the Indonesian Criminal Code, and with "offensive actions" under Article 335 of the Code. The indictment accused Tajul Muluk of telling his followers that the Qur'an is not the authentic text of Islam. His trial began at the Sampang District Court on 24 April 2012 and he was sentenced to two years in prison on 12 July 2012 under Article 156(a). Following the verdict Tajul Muluk reportedly said he would lodge an appeal.

In 2022, over 30 local areas, including in the Sintang Regency in West Kalimantan, banned or limited Shi'a activities.

== Christian community ==
On 13 May 2018 three churches were the target of suicide bombings in Surabaya.

On 28 November 2020, about 10 people, allegedly from East Indonesia Mujahideen, killed four Christians and burning a Salvation Army post and Christians homes at Central Sulawesi, Indonesia. In 2021, police arrested 11 suspected Jamaah Ansharut Daulah (JAD) members for allegedly plotting to kill the Catholic Archbishop of Merauke and attack several churches; they were given prison sentences ranging from 2 to 3.5 years.

In 2022, a court sentenced a Christian YouTuber to 10 years in prison for blasphemy and hate speech against Islam.

In 2022, the government launched the Torang Semua Ciptaan Tuhan (We are all God's creatures) project and funded several Christian leaders to travel to Jerusalem; in the same year, the South Jakarta District Court granted the request for an interfaith marriage between a Christian and a Muslim. The government also withdrew and revised a school textbook after Christians protested that it included inaccurate Christian theology.

In 2024, the Indonesian Police found 2 bombs targeted at worship places. The police confiscated the bomb quickly.

== Suppression of atheism ==
Alexander Aan, a 30-year-old civil servant from Pulau Punjung subdistrict in West Sumatera province gave up his belief in God as he considered the current state of the world. He was reportedly an active member of the Minang atheist Facebook group. He allegedly posted statements and pictures which some people construed as insulting Islam and the prophet Mohammad. On 18 January 2012 an angry crowd who had heard about his alleged Facebook posts gathered at his workplace and threatened to beat him. Police officers intervened and took him to the Pulau Punjung Sub-District police station for his safety. On 20 January he was charged for "disseminating information aimed at inciting religious hatred or hostility" under Article 28 (2) of the Electronic Information and Transaction (ITE) Law, religious blasphemy under Article 156a(a) of the Indonesian Criminal Code and calling for others to embrace atheism under Article 156a(b) of the same code. His trial began at the Muaro District Court on 2 April 2012. On 14 June the court sentenced him to two and a half years' imprisonment and a fine of 100 million rupiah (US$10,600) for violating the Electronic Information and Transaction (ITE) Law.

In 2022, the Indonesian Atheists group stated that it has more than 1,700 members.

== 2010 developments ==
According to the U.S. State Department's 2010 report on the status of religious freedom in Indonesia, there were numerous areas of improvements in religious freedom during that year. Representatives of the Confucian community continued to practice their religion freely as well as obtain marriage certificates and identity cards with Confucianism listed as their religion.

Local government officials in West Nusa Tenggara (NTB) recognized the marriages of Ahmadiyya followers. Officials from the NTB Department of Religion conducted weddings in the Ahmadiyya Transito Camp for Ahmadiyya couples and recorded and issued marriage certificates. Ahmadiyya followers experienced little or no difficulty registering their marriages or getting marriage certificates during the reporting period.

By contrast a 2017 report from Christian Solidarity Worldwide suggested intolerance is increasing.

In March 2020, 15 Indonesians filed a lawsuit with the Supreme Court arguing that the closure of thousands of places of worship was being done under a discriminatory law, the 2006 Religious Harmony regulation.

== Conditions in 2022 ==
Research in 2020 stated that Indonesia is one of the top five countries with the highest levels of government restrictions.

In 2022, the Setara Institute on Democracy and Peace noted a total of 333 incidents involving infringement on religious freedom; these were mainly against non-Sunni Muslims and were highest in East Java.

In 2022, Freedom House rated Indonesia’s religious freedom as 1 out of 4, noting that Indonesia officially recognizes Islam, Protestantism, Roman Catholicism, Hinduism, Buddhism, and Confucianism. Individuals may leave the “religion” section on their identity cards blank, but will often face discrimination. Atheism is not accepted, and the criminal code contains provisions against blasphemy, penalizing those who “distort” or “misrepresent” recognized faiths. In particular, it notes that the government tolerates persecution against Ahmadi and Shiite communities.

== See also ==
- Maluku sectarian conflict (1999-2002)
- Religion in Indonesia
- Human rights in Indonesia
- Atheism in Indonesian law
