= Tajul Muluk =

Shia religious leader of Madura Island, Indonesia

- Born: Ali Murtadha c. 1971; Sampang Regency
- Occupation: religious leader
- Known for: 2012 blasphemy arrest

Tajul Muluk (born c. 1971 as Ali Murtadha) is a Shia religious leader of Madura Island, Indonesia. In December 2011, his pesantren was burned down in an arson attack by anti-Shiite protesters. In March 2012, he was charged with blasphemy; the following month he was arrested, leading Amnesty International to designate him a prisoner of conscience.

== Early life ==
Tajul Muluk's father Makmun was a Kyai (an expert in Islam) living in Sampang Regency. After coming to admire the Shiite Ayatollah Khomeini from newspapers sent by a friend in Iran in the early 1980s, Makmun sent his four children to a Shiite-dominated pesantren (religious boarding school) in Bangil, Pasuruan. Tajul Muluk later continued his studies in Saudi Arabia in 1993, where he lived doing miscellaneous jobs until 1999, when he returned to Sampang.

== School founding ==
Following the request of some residents to speak about his religious education, he opened his own Shiite-oriented pesantren, Misbahul Huda, in the village of Nangkernang.

In 2006, a kyai and other Sunni leaders of Nangkernang began to object to the presence of the Shiite school, calling it a "deviant sect", and in April 2007, a protest against the school's celebration of the birth of Muhammad was attended by thousands. In 2009, Tajul's brother Roisul left the Shiites to become a Sunni, and began to speak against Tajul. Tajul attributed Roisul's anger to a conflict over a woman Roisul had wanted to marry, while Roisul stated that the conflict stemmed from Tajul's proselytizing. The resulting conflict was settled by the mediation of the Indonesian Ulema Council. Several Sunni ulama demanded that Tajul sign an agreement that he would not proselytize, but Tajul refused.

== Arson attack ==
On 29 December 2011, the pesantren was attacked by a group of armed anti-Shiite protesters. The pesantren buildings as well as the homes of Tajul Muluk and his brother Iklil were burned down, and Muluk and other group members were threatened with death; two other homes, a madrasah, and a musholla were also burned to the ground. Iklil, present for the attack, later stated that he witnessed two police officers in the crowd standing still. He further alleged that though the police had sufficient warning of the protest, they took no action to stop the attack. A man named Muslika was identified and arrested by police as one of the planners of the arson, but Tajul stated his belief that his brother Roisul was the attack's true leader.

On 8 March 2012, a Commission for Missing Persons and Victims of Violence (KONTRAS) advocacy team criticized the handling of the investigation and the continued threats against Sampang's Shiites, calling it "discriminative". Following the attack, KONTRAS also requested that Tajul and 22 of his followers receive protection through the Witness and Victim Protection Agency. As of April 2012, the attack remains unsolved.

== Blasphemy arrest ==
On 1 January 2012, the Sampang branch of the Indonesian Ulema Council released a fatwa which called Tajul's teachings "deviant", and on 3 January, Roisul formally reported him to the police for blasphemy.

On 6 March, the East Java police questioned Tajul about the potential blasphemy charges. He was charged on 16 March under Article 156a of the Criminal Code for "defamation of religion" and Article 335 of the Criminal Code for "unpleasant acts", which carries a sentence of five years in prison. He was required to report to the provincial police weekly. On 12 April, after reporting, he was arrested. As of 18 April, he was being held in a prison in Sampang until his trial. According to his elder brother Ustad Iklil al-Milal, Tajul is often threatened by other prisoners, which is allowed by the guards.

Amnesty International objected to his detention, stating, "He is a prisoner of conscience and should be released immediately and unconditionally. These blasphemy laws are fundamentally incompatible with Indonesia’s international human rights obligations to protect and respect freedom of expression, and freedom of thought, conscience, religion and equality." Andy Irfan Junaidi, coordinator for KONTRAS in Semarang, said that Tajul was not provoking inter-faith conflict like several earlier "deviant" leaders, but only practicing Shiite as it is done internationally. He argued that if the government wished to find Tajul guilty of blasphemy, it would have to declare Shiite deviant throughout Indonesia.

Due to the prevalence of anti-Shiite activism in Sampang, Tajul's lawyer requested that the trial be moved to Surabaya, the provincial capital, in order to ensure Tajul received a fair trial and avoid potential riots. Tempo magazine notes that several pieces of evidence are expected to be used as evidence against Tajul, including several books he has written and formal letters.

== August 2012 attacks ==
On 26 August 2012, Tajul's community in Sampang was attacked again by a 500-person mob. One man, Muhammad Hasyim, was killed and another hospitalized. Amnesty International called on Indonesia to investigate the attacks and take steps to protect the community in the future.
