= Revised Joint Ministerial Decrees on Construction of Houses of Worship =

2006 Indonesian law on temple building

On 21 March 2006, the Indonesian Ministers of Religious Affairs and Home Affairs issued a decree that is commonly referred to as the Joint Decree on Houses of Worship. The decree issued as Ministry of Religious Affairs decree No. 9 of 2006 and Ministry of Home Affairs decree No. 8 of 2006. A translation of the full title is "Regulation of Duties of Regional Head and Deputy in Maintaining Religious Harmony, Empowering the Forum of Religious Harmony, and Constructing Places of Worship".

== Background ==
The decree is a revision of a joint decree issued in 1969 by the Indonesian Home Affairs Minister and Religious Affairs Minister and which covers building houses of prayer. In 1967–1969, churches were attacked, sometimes destroyed, on Sumatra, Sulawesi, and Java. These violent episodes appeared to have been triggered by construction of buildings for religious minorities. In response, on 13 September 1969, the Ministers of Religion and Home Affairs issued Joint Ministerial Decree 1/1969 to control construction of places of worship and to govern religious practices in general.

== Requirements ==
According to Article 14 of the 2006 decree, a permit for constructing a house of worship should issue when the applicant obtains:

- a list of 90 members of the proto-congregation;
- signatures from 60 local households of a different faith;
- a written recommendation from the regency or municipal religious affairs office;
- a written recommendation from the local interfaith harmony forum (FKUB); and
- approval from the subdistrict head.

Article 14 requires local governments to find an alternative or temporary venue for services if the group cannot meet one of the requirements. Article 21 requires that local governments fairly mediate disputes.

== Concerns ==
While the government of Indonesia asserted that the purpose of the 2006 decree was to reduce inter-faith conflict, many persons and organizations assert that the decree is unconstitutional, is contrary to treaties ratified by Indonesia, and has increased inter-faith conflict and the ability of a region's majority faith to suppress other faiths. Others note that the decree's requirements create opportunities for corruption.

Specific concerns raised regarding the 2006 decree include:

1. Aggressive religious organizations apply pressure on and pay locals to not sign or rescind signatures of petitions.
2. The FKUB is not an elected body and is dominated by the local majority religion. Where such majority practitioners are intolerant of other religions, the FKUB effectively vetoes construction of minority religious buildings.
3. Aggressive religious organizations apply pressure on regional entities to not provide recommendations or approve permits for which applicants have otherwise qualified.
4. Even if all requirements are met, certain officials have stated that they will not issue permits if any local objections remain.
5. Even if the permit is issued, vociferous responses from militant groups have caused local officials to rescind permits or to not protect the applicant's ability to construct or use the building.
6. After using FKUB or political influence to prevent issuance of a permit, extremist groups use failure to obtain a permit as a pretext for attacking the applicant congregation when it attempts to meet at the site or elsewhere.

On the other hand, some (including minority religious organizations) have suggested that the 2006 decree is better than nothing. Such organizations note that the decree provides a minority religious organization with at least a legal argument that it is entitled to a permit. Such commentators suggest that the decree would be acceptable if implemented in a consistent and expedited manner, with charges of "disturbance of public order" applied to opposing vigilantes rather than applicants. Further, certain regions appear to be encountering less inter-faith strife than others.

== See also ==
- Freedom of religion in Indonesia
- Fatwa on Religious Pluralism, Liberalism, and Secularism
- May 1998 riots of Indonesia
