= Christianity in West Sumatra =

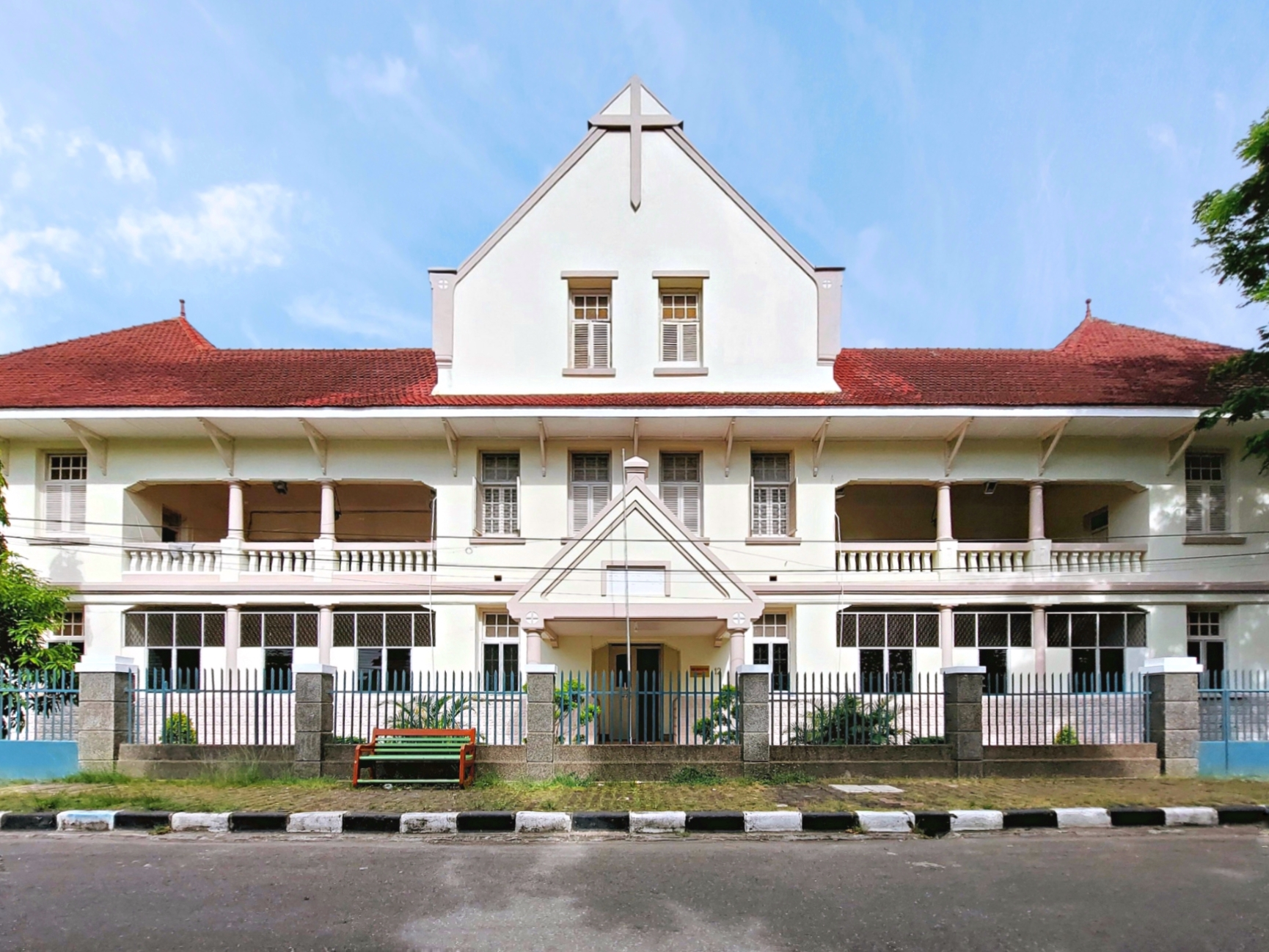
The Padang Diocese building was built during the Dutch colonial era

Christianity is the second largest religious community in the Indonesian province of West Sumatra after Islam. Christians in West Sumatra generally come from the Mentawai, Batak, Chinese and Nias ethnicities. According to a 2021 Ministry of Home Affairs data, the percentage of Christians in West Sumatra is 2.34%: to 1.50% Protestant, and 0.84% Catholic. Christianity is the demographic majority in the Mentawai Islands Regency.

== Christians by municipality ==
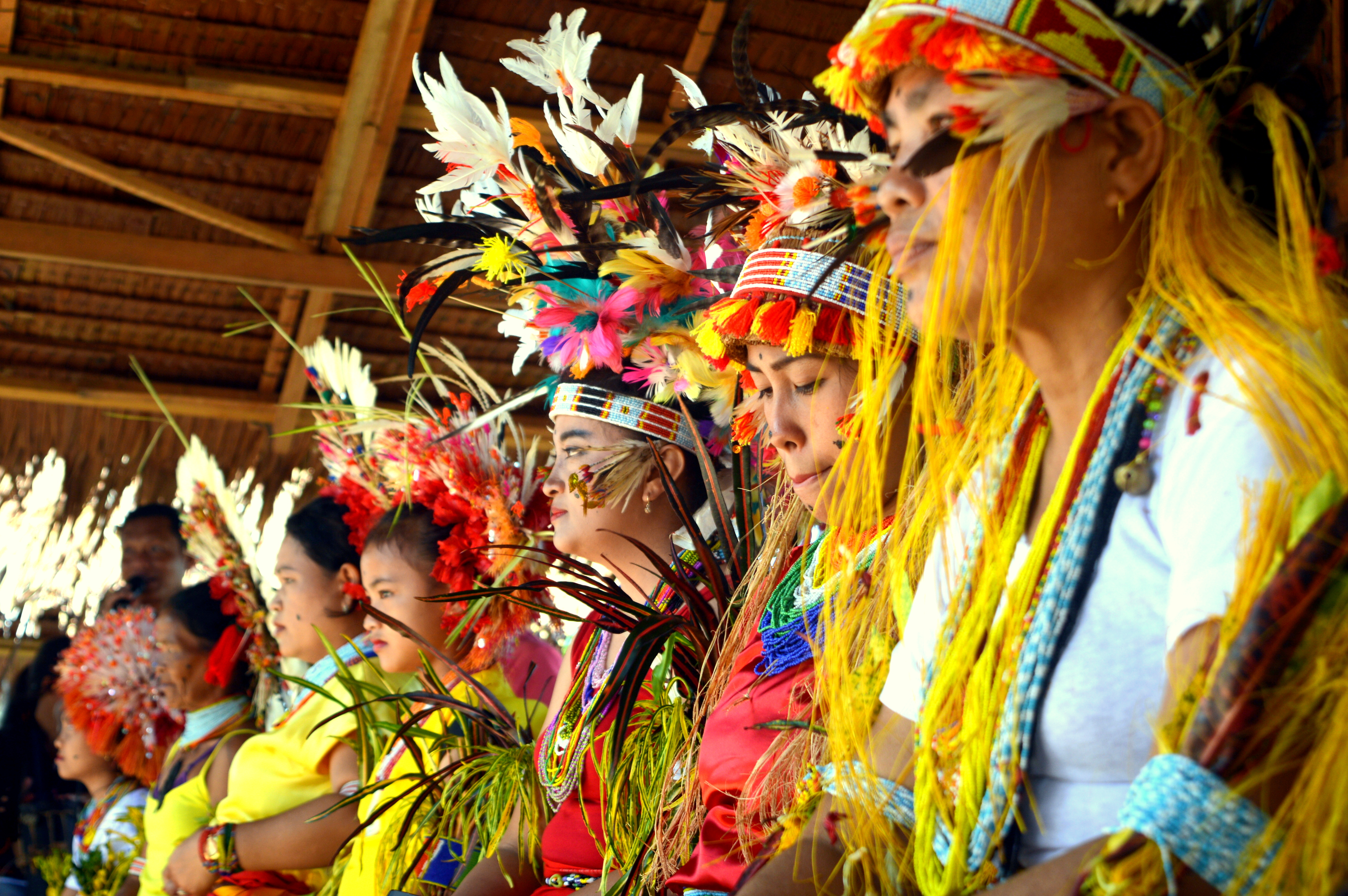
The majority of Mentawai people in West Sumatra adhere to Christianity

The following is data on Christians in West Sumatra, based on data from the Ministry of Home Affairs as of 30 June 2021.

Christianity in West Sumatra (2021)
No.	Municipality	Population	Protestants	%	Catholics	%	Total Christians	%
1	Mentawai Islands Regency	90.904	44.068	48,48%	26.365	29,00%	70.433	77,48%
2	Padang City	918.463	14.130	1,54%	12.377	1,35%	26.507	2,89%
3	Bukittinggi City	128.944	2.095	1,62%	1.134	0,88%	3.229	2,50%
4	West Pasaman Regency	436.298	7.395	1,70%	2.769	0,63%	10.164	2,33%
5	Dharmasraya Regency	226.264	3.162	1,40%	489	0,22%	3.651	1,62%
6	Padang Panjang City	59.998	392	0,65%	357	0,60%	749	1,25%
7	Payakumbuh City	141.171	831	0,59%	700	0,50%	1.531	1,09%
8	Solok City	76.272	512	0,67%	271	0,36%	783	1,03%
9	Agam Regency	524.561	3.915	0,75%	397	0,08%	4.312	0,83%
10	South Solok Regency	181.661	1.312	0,72%	184	0,10%	1.496	0,82%
11	Sawalunto City	66.962	306	0,46%	114	0,17%	420	0,63%
12	Sijunjung Regency	240.079	882	0,37%	301	0,13%	1.183	0,50%
13	Padang Pariaman Regency	436.893	1.496	0,34%	485	0,11%	1.981	0,45%
14	Pasaman Regency	301.444	1.171	0,39%	162	0,05%	1.333	0,44%
15	Pariaman City	95.519	197	0,21%	117	0,12%	314	0,33%
16	Pesisir Selatan Regency	515.549	811	0,16%	181	0,04%	992	0,20%
17	Lima Puluh Kota Regency	388.585	511	0,13%	241	0,06%	752	0,19%
18	Tanah Datar Regency	374.431	325	0,09%	139	0,04%	464	0,13%
19	Solok Regency	392.338	320	0,08%	38	0,01%	358	0,09%
	Total	5.596.336	83.831	1,50%	46.821	0,84%	130.652	2,34%
