= List of Christian denominations by number of members =

World Christianity broken up into the 6 taxonomical groups as per Pew Research Center in 2011
1. Catholic (50.1%)
2. Protestant (36.7%)
3. Eastern Orthodox (9.40%)
4. Oriental Orthodox (2.50%)
5. Restorationist and Other (1.29%)
6. Church of the East (0.01%)

This is a list of Christian denominations by number of members. It is inevitably partial and generally based on claims by the denominations themselves. The numbers should therefore be considered approximate and the article an ongoing work-in-progress.

The list includes the six main taxonomically divided groups which are the: Church of the East, Oriental Orthodoxy, Eastern Orthodoxy, Catholicism, Protestantism, and Restorationism. This list additionally includes individual denominations such as the Eastern Catholic Churches, independent Catholic denominations, offshoots of both Eastern and Oriental Orthodoxy, as well as Protestant and Restorationist denominations with at least 200,000 members.

Christianity is the largest religious group in the world, with an estimated 2.3 to 2.6 billion adherents in 2020.

== Christian denominational families ==
The various denominations of Christianity fall into several large families, shaped both by culture and history.

Christianity arose in the first century AD after Rome had conquered much of the western parts of the fragmented Hellenistic empire created by Alexander the Great. The linguistic and cultural divisions of the first century AD Roman Empire with, broadly speaking, a Latin West and a Greek East, but also with significant areas in North Africa where Coptic was the dominant language, and areas in the Near East where Syriac or Aramaic was the dominant language, were reflected in the early Christian church. The church was called "Catholic" meaning "universal" from very early in the second century, a tacit acknowledgement of the many different cultures it encompassed.

Early Christianity suffered great, although intermittent, persecution from the state until Emperor Constantine the Great issued the Edict of Milan in 313 AD, legalizing Christianity. Shortly after the cessation of persecution, the Church had the luxury of reflecting on the meaning of its own teachings for the first time. Significant disputes arose, particularly over the nature of Christ and the relationship between Christ, the Father, and the Spirit. The Church chose to address those disputes with Ecumenical councils, the first four of which were at Nicaea, Constantinople, Ephesus and Chalcedon. The first two of these councils, the First Council of Nicaea and the First Council of Constantinople gave birth to the Nicene Creed which has become the touchstone for Christian beliefs.

Both of the next two Councils, the Council of Ephesus, and the Council of Chalcedon led to significant ruptures in the Church. Many Christians espousing the minority position at these two councils, even after extensive discussion and attempts at reconciliation, chose to strike out on their own, rather than to accept the positions held by the majority of the church fathers at the councils.

The Church of the East, encompassing the Syriac speaking Christians in Sasanian-occupied Mesopotamia and far-eastern border regions of the Roman Empire, began to break contact with the Christians in the Roman Empire due to political pressure from the Persians as well as disagreements following the Council of Ephesus after 431 AD.

In 451 AD, after the Council of Chalcedon, the group that later became known as the Oriental Orthodox Churches, encompassing many Coptic speaking Christians in North Africa, also split off.

In 1054 AD, an accumulation of misunderstanding, disrespect, political pressures, and genuine theological differences led to the Great Schism, dividing Greek-speaking Christians who became the Eastern Orthodox, from Latin-speaking Christians who kept the name Catholic, but increasingly prefaced it with the adjective "Roman".

Beginning in 1517, the western, Latin-speaking church was itself rent asunder by the Protestant Reformation, with many Christians rejecting papal authority and organising together in new ways. Broadly speaking, Protestantism has four streams: Lutheranism, Calvinism, Anabaptism, and Anglicanism. While all of these Christian groups have their own subsequent splits, the fragmentation in Protestantism has been relatively extreme, with hundreds of denominations. However, many of these independent churches still belong to broader Protestant traditions.

Some of these fragmented groups, particularly among the Eastern churches, have sought to return or reestablish communion with the Catholic Church, and have reunited themselves under papal authority.

(Not shown are ante-Nicene, nontrinitarian, and restorationist denominations.)

Major branches and movements within Protestantism

== Catholicism – 1.272–1.422 billion ==
Catholicism is the main branch of Christianity and the Catholic Church is the largest among churches. About 50% of all Christians are Catholics. According to the annual directory of the Catholic Church or Annuario Pontificio of 2024, there were 1.390 billion baptized Catholics in 2022; that was 1.422 billion in 2024. In 2025, the World Christian Database reported 1.272 billion Catholics. That figure does not include independent denominations that self-identify as Catholic, numbering some 19 million adherents subscribing to Old Catholicism and other forms of Independent Catholicism.

Countries by total number of Catholics (2010)

A map of Catholicism by population percentage

=== Eastern Catholic Churches – 18 million ===
- Byzantine Rite – 8.7 million
  - Ukrainian Greek Catholic Church – 5.5 million
  - Melkite Greek Catholic Church – 1.6 million
  - Romanian Greek Catholic Church – 0.5 million
  - Ruthenian Greek Catholic Church – 0.4 million
  - Hungarian Greek Catholic Church – 0.3 million
  - Slovak Greek Catholic Church – 0.3 million
  - Belarusian Greek Catholic Church – 0.1 million
  - Italo-Albanian Catholic Church – 0.01 million
  - Greek Catholic Church of Croatia and Serbia – 0.01 million
  - Georgian Byzantine Catholic Church (not sui iuris) – 0.01 million
  - Albanian Greek Catholic Church – 0.01 million
  - Russian Greek Catholic Church – 0.01 million
  - Greek Byzantine Catholic Church – 0.006 million
  - Macedonian Greek Catholic Church – 0.001 million
  - Bulgarian Greek Catholic Church – 0.001 million
- East Syriac Rite – 4.9 million
  - Syro-Malabar Church – 4.3 million
  - Chaldean Catholic Church – 0.6 million
- West Syriac Rite – 4.2 million
  - Maronite Church – 3.5 million
  - Syro-Malankara Catholic Church – 0.5 million
  - Syriac Catholic Church – 0.2 million
- Armenian Rite – 0.8 million
  - Armenian Catholic Church – 0.8 million
- Alexandrian Rite – 0.5 million
  - Coptic Catholic Church – 0.2 million
  - Eritrean Catholic Church – 0.2 million
  - Ethiopian Catholic Church – 0.07 million

== Protestantism – 0.800–1.1 billion ==
Countries by number of Protestants (2010)

Protestantism is the second‑largest major group of Christians by number of followers. In 2025, the World Christian Database reported 629 million historic Protestants, 409 million Independents, and 151 million unaffiliated Christians, collectively referred to as broad‑sense Protestantism. Estimates vary from 628 million in the narrow sense to 1.2 billion in the broad sense, representing between 24% and 45% of all Christians. The main reason for this wide range is the lack of a common agreement among scholars as to which denominations constitute Protestantism. For instance, most sources include Anabaptism, Anglicanism, Baptists and non-denominational Christianity as part of Protestantism. However, widely used references like the World Christian Encyclopedia, which has been documenting the changing status of World Christianity over the past 120 years, classifies Independent Christians or non-denominational Pentecostals as a separate category from Protestantism. Moreover, Protestant denominations altogether do not form a single structure comparable to the Catholic Church, or to a lesser extent the Eastern Orthodox communion. However, several different comparable communions exist within Protestantism, such as the World Evangelical Alliance, the Anglican Communion, the World Communion of Reformed Churches, the Baptist World Alliance, the World Methodist Council and the Lutheran World Federation. Regardless, 900 million is the most accepted figure among various authors and scholars, and thus is used in this article. Note that this 900 million figure also includes Anglicans, Anabaptists, Baptists, as well as multiple other groups that might sometimes disavow a common "Protestant" designation, and would rather prefer to be called, simply, "Christian". According to Mark Juergensmeyer of the University of California, "popular Protestantism" (that is to say all forms of Protestantism with the notable exception of the historical denominations deriving from the Protestant Reformation) is the most dynamic religious movement in the contemporary world, alongside resurgent Islam.

=== Historical Protestantism – 400–600 million ===
The number of individuals who are members of historical Protestant Churches totals to 400–600 million. (Note: In 2011, the Pew Research Center estimated that there were 800,640,000 Protestants. Of these, 51%, or 408,326,400 people, were historic Protestants. This includes: 10.6% (84,867,840 people) Anglican, 9.7% (77,662,080 people) Lutheran, 9% (72,057,600 people) Baptist, 7.5% (60,048,000 people) Presbyterian/Reformed/Congregational (7% Presbyterian/Reformed, or 56,044,800 people and 0.5%, or 4,003,200 people, Congregational), 7.2% (57,646,080 people) United Church, 3.4% (27,221,760 people) Methodist, 2.7% (21,617,280 people) Adventist, 0.5% (4,003,200 people) Brethren, 0.3% (2,401,920 people) Salvation Army and 0.1% (800,640 people) Moravians.) (Note: According to Global Christianity: A Guide to the World's Largest Religion from Afghanistan to Zimbabwe, in 2020, in the world, there were 497,473,800 Historic Protestants, including: 97,399,000 Anglicans; 84,192,000 Baptists; 77,792,000 United and United Churches; 70,432,000 Presbyterian, Reformed and Congregational (65,446,000 Reformed/Presbyterian and 4,986,000 Congregational); 69,894,000 Lutherans; 46,389,000 Methodists and Holiness Movement (31,683,000 Methodist and 14,706,000 Holiness Moviment); 29,011,000 Adventists; 11,603,000 Restorationism/Disciples of Christ; 3,959,000 Christian Bretheren; 2,385,000 Mennonite (1,413,000 in Africa, 618,000 in North America, 223,000 in Latin America and 131,000 in Europe); 1,660,000 Salvationism (1,025,000 in Africa, 461,000 in North America, 97,900 in Europe and 76,100 in Oceania); 1,455,000 Friends/Quaker (in Africa); 965,000 Moravians (731,000 in Africa and 234,000 in Latin America); 222,000 Dunkers (in North America) and 115,800 Exclusive Bretheren (104,000 in Europe and 11,800 in Oceania).) (Note: In 2025, the Gordon Conwell Seminary estimated that there were 628,862,000 historic Protestants.)

A map of countries that have a church that is a member of the Anglican Communion (blue), the Porvoo Communion (green), comprising European Anglican and Lutheran churches, and the Union of Utrecht of the Old Catholic Churches (red), a federation of Old Catholic Churches.

==== Anglicanism – 85–110 million ====
There are 85–110 million Christians in Anglican tradition, mostly part of the Anglican Communion, the third-largest Christian communion in the world, with 42 members (provinces). When united churches in the Anglican Communion and the breakaway Continuing Anglican movement were not counted, there were an estimated 97.4 million Anglicans worldwide in 2020.

- Anglican Communion – 85–110 million
  - Global Fellowship of Confessing Anglicans – 52 million
    - Church of Nigeria – 25 million
    - Church of Uganda – 13.3 million
    - Anglican Church of Kenya – 5.8 million
    - Province of the Episcopal Church of South Sudan – 5 million
    - Anglican Church of Rwanda – 1.5 million
    - Province of the Anglican Church of the Congo – 0.5 million
    - Anglican Church in North America – 0.1 million
    - Reformed Evangelical Anglican Church of South Africa – 0.1 million
  - Church of England – 21.8 million
  - Church of South India – 5 million
  - Anglican Church of Southern Africa – 3–4 million
  - Anglican Church of Australia – 2.5–4.9 million
  - Church of North India – 2.3 million
  - Anglican Church of Tanzania – 2.0–3.3 million
  - Church of Pakistan – 1.9 million
  - Episcopal Church in the United States – 1.4 million
  - Province of the Episcopal Church of Sudan – 1.1 million
  - Church of the Province of West Africa – 1.0 million
  - Anglican Church of Burundi – 0.9 million
  - Church of the Province of Central Africa – 0.9 million
  - Church in the Province of the West Indies – 0.8 million
  - Church of the Province of the Indian Ocean – 0.5 million
  - Anglican Church of Mozambique and Angola – 0.5 million
  - Anglican Church in Aotearoa, New Zealand and Polynesia – 0.4 million
  - Church of Ireland – 0.3 million
  - Anglican Church of Canada – 0.3–1.1 million
  - Anglican Church of Papua New Guinea – 0.2 million
  - Anglican Church of Melanesia – 0.2–0.4 million
  - Episcopal Church in the Philippines – 0.2 million
  - Anglican Church of Korea – 0.1 million
  - Episcopal Anglican Church of Brazil – 0.1 million
  - Anglican Church in Central America – 0.04 million
- Continuing Anglican movement and independent churches – 0.7 million
  - Traditional Anglican Church – 0.4 million

==== Baptist churches – 51–110 million ====
The worldwide Baptist community numbers about 100 million. However, the Baptist World Alliance, a world communion of Baptist churches, self-reports only 51 million baptized believers, as Baptists do not count children as members, since they believe in believer's baptism, nor do all Baptists participate in the Alliance. Therefore, the BWA is the eighth-largest Christian communion.

- Southern Baptist Convention – 12.3 million
- Nigerian Baptist Convention – 9.0 million
- National Baptist Convention, USA – 8.4 million
- National Baptist Convention of America International – 3.5 million
- Baptist Convention of Tanzania – 2.7 million
- Baptist Convention of Kenya – 2.0 million
- Baptist General Convention of Texas – 1.8 million
- Brazilian Baptist Convention – 1.8 million
- Baptist Community of the Congo River – 1.8 million
- Myanmar Baptist Convention – 1.8 million
- Council of Baptist Churches in Northeast India – 1.6 million
- Progressive National Baptist Convention – 1.5 million
- Lott Carey Foreign Mission Convention – 1.2 million
- Baptist Bible Fellowship International – 1.2 million
- American Baptist Churches USA – 1.1 million
- Baptist Community of Congo – 1.0 million
- National Primitive Baptist Convention of the U.S.A. – 1.0 million
- Cooperative Baptist Fellowship – 0.7 million
- Convention of Philippine Baptist Churches – 0.7 million
- Reformed Baptist Convention in Rwanda – 0.6 million
- Baptist General Association of Virginia – 0.6 million
- Korea Baptist Convention – 0.5 million
- Baptist Union of Uganda – 0.5 million
- Samavesam of Telugu Baptist Churches – 0.5 million
- National Baptist Convention, Brazil – 0.4 million
- National Missionary Baptist Convention of America – 0.4 million
- Baptist Convention of Malawi – 0.4 million
- Converge – 0.4 million
- Baptist Convention of Zimbabwe – 0.3 million
- Cameroon Baptist Convention – 0.3 million
- Baptist Fellowship of Zambia – 0.3 million
- Convention of Baptist Churches of the Northern Circars (Índia) – 0.2 million
- Euro-Asiatic Federation of Unions of Evangelical Christians-Baptists – 0.2 million
- Baptist Community in Central Africa – 0.2 million
- Baptist Union of Zambia – 0.2 million
- Venture Church Network – 0.2 million
- National Association of Free Will Baptists – 0.2 million
- Convention of Visayas and Mindanao of Southern Baptist Churches – 0.2 million
- Seventh Day Baptists – 0.05 million

==== Lutheranism – 70–90 million ====
Number of Lutheran adherents by country: More than 10 million 5 million-10 million 1 million to 5 million 500 thousand to 1 million 100 thousand to 500 thousand 25 thousand to 100 thousand

The number of adherents in the Lutheran denominations totals to 70–90 million persons (the Lutheran World Federation reports 78 million and is the sixth-largest communion) being represented in the following churches:

- Evangelical Church in Germany – 17.4 million, including also United churches
- Ethiopian Evangelical Church Mekane Yesus – 15.0 million
- Evangelical Lutheran Church in Tanzania – 8.5 million
- Batak Christian Protestant Church – 6.3 million
- Church of Sweden – 5.4 million
- Church of Denmark – 4.2 million
- Malagasy Lutheran Church – 4.0 million
- United Evangelical Lutheran Churches in India – 3.9 million
- Evangelical Lutheran Church of Finland – 3.4 million
- Church of Norway – 3.4 million
- Evangelical Lutheran Church in America – 2.6 million
- Lutheran Church of Christ in Nigeria – 2.3 million
- Evangelical Lutheran Church of Papua New Guinea – 1.8 million
- Lutheran Church – Missouri Synod – 1.7 million
- Evangelical Lutheran Church in Namibia – 0.9 million
- Evangelical Lutheran Church of Cameroon – 0.7 million
- Evangelical Church of the Lutheran Confession in Brazil – 0.6 million
- Evangelical Lutheran Church in Southern Africa – 0.6 million
- The Protestant Christian Church – 0.5 million
- Evangelical Lutheran Church in the Republic of Namibia – 0.4 million
- Evangelical Free Church of America – 0.4 million
- Evangelical Lutheran Church in Zimbabwe – 0.3 million
- The Indonesian Christian Church – 0.3 million
- Lutheran Congregations in Mission for Christ – 0.3 million
- Christian Protestant Church in Indonesia – 0.3 million
- Wisconsin Evangelical Lutheran Synod – 0.3 million
- Evangelical Lutheran Church of Latvia – 0.2 million
- Protestant Church of the Augsburg Confession in Austria – 0.2 million
- Evangelical Lutheran Church of Brazil – 0.2 million
- Church of Iceland – 0.2 million
- Simalungun Protestant Christian Church – 0.2 million
- Protestant Church of the Augsburg Confession of Alsace and Lorraine – 0.2 million
- Evangelical Church of the Augsburg Confession in Slovakia – 0.2 million
- Evangelical-Lutheran Church in Hungary – 0.2 million
- Estonian Evangelical Lutheran Church – 0.2 million
- Laestadianism (various denominations) – 0.2 million

==== Calvinism / Reformed churches – 85–100 million ====
The churches of the Reformed tradition (which includes the Presbyterians, Continental Reformed, Congregationalists, and Waldensians) together have about 70–80 million members. The United Churches of Reformed origin have about 36 million members. the World Communion of Reformed Churches is one of the largest Christian communions, having 100 million members, considering only full members denominations.

- Presbyterianism – 50 million
  - Presbyterian Church of Nigeria – 5.8 million
  - Presbyterian Church of East Africa – 4.0 million
  - Presbyterian Church of Cameroon – 4.0 million
  - Presbyterian Church of Africa – 3.4 million
  - Church of Central Africa Presbyterian – 3.1 million
  - National Presbyterian Church in Mexico – 2.8 million
  - Church of Christ in Congo–Presbyterian Community of Congo – 2.5 million
  - Presbyterian Church in Korea (HapDong) – 2.25 million
  - Presbyterian Church of Korea (TongHap) – 2.19 million
  - Presbyterian Church in Korea (BaekSeok) – 2.0 million
  - Presbyterian Church in Cameroon – 2.0 million
  - Presbyterian Church in Rwanda – 1.6 million
  - Presbyterian Church of India – 1.6 million
  - Presbyterian Church of Ghana – 1.4 million (Note: The Presbyterian Church of Ghana announced in 2024 that it had 1,366,375 members in 2023. In 2025, it published that it had a net increase of 103,392 new members in 2024. Therefore, the number of members of the denomination in 2024 is 1,469,767 people.)
  - Presbyterian Church in Sudan – 1.0 million
  - Presbyterian Church (USA) – 1.0 million
  - Evangelical Church of Egypt (Synod of the Nile) – 0.7 million
  - Presbyterian Church of Brazil – 0.7 million
  - Evangelical Presbyterian Church, Ghana – 0.6 million
  - United Church of Christ in the Philippines – 0.5 million
  - Uniting Presbyterian Church in Southern Africa – 0.5 million
  - Presbyterian Church of Pakistan – 0.5 million
  - Presbyterian Church in America – 0.4 million
  - Orthodox Presbyterian Church in Cameroon – 0.4 million
  - Kosin Presbyterian Church in Korea – 0.4 million
  - United Church of Canada – 0.3 million
  - Church of Scotland – 0.2 million or 1.5 million
  - Uniting Church in Australia – 0.2 million
  - Presbyterian Church in Taiwan – 0.2 million
  - Presbyterian Church of Mozambique – 0.2 million
  - Presbyterian Church in Ireland – 0.2 million
- Continental Reformed Protestantism – 30 million
  - Church of Christ in Nations – 8.0 million
  - Church of Jesus Christ in Madagascar – 6.0 million
  - United Church in Zambia – 4.0 million
  - Protestant Church in Indonesia – 3.7 million
  - Evangelical Church of Cameroon – 2.5 million
  - Protestant Church of Switzerland – 1.7 million
  - Evangelical Reformed Church of Christ – 1.5 million
  - Protestant Church in the Netherlands – 1.4 million
  - Dutch Reformed Church in South Africa (NGK) – 1.1 million
  - Church of Christ in the Sudan Among the Tiv – 1.0 million
  - Reformed Church in Zambia – 1.0 million
  - Reformed Church in Hungary – 0.9 million
  - Uniting Reformed Church in Southern Africa – 0.9 million
  - Evangelical Christian Church of the Land of Papua – 0.8 million
  - Lesotho Evangelical Church in Southern Africa – 0.8 million
  - United Church in Papua New Guinea – 0.7 million
  - Central Sulawesi Christian Church – 0.5 million
  - Christian Reformed Church of Nigeria – 0.5 million
  - Reformed Church in Romania – 0.5 million
  - Christian Church of Sumba – 0.3 million
  - Evangelical Church in Kalimantan – 0.3 million
  - Karo Batak Protestant Church – 0.3 million
  - Evangelical Christian Church in Halmahera – 0.3 million
  - Evangelical Reformed Church in Angola – 0.3 million
  - Toraja Church – 0.2 million
  - Evangelical Church of Congo – 0.2 million
  - United Protestant Church of France – 0.2 million
  - Sudanese Church of Christ – 0.2 million
  - Christian Evangelical Church in Bolaang Mongondow – 0.2 million
  - Javanese Christian Church – 0.2 million
  - Indonesian Christian Church Synod – 0.2 million
  - Christian Reformed Church in North America – 0.2 million
  - Christian Evangelical Church of Sangihe Talaud – 0.2 million
  - Evangelical Reformed Church in Germany – 0.1 million
- Congregationalism – 5 million
  - United Congregational Church of Southern Africa – 1.5 million
  - Evangelical Congregational Church in Angola – 1.0 million
  - United Church of Christ – 0.7 million
  - United Church of Christ in Zimbabwe – 0.2 million

==== Methodism – 46–60 million ====
Methodism, including the Holiness Movement, has about 46 million members worldwide. United Churches of Methodist origin have another 14 million members. The World Methodist Council (WMC), with 39,8 million members is the ninth-largest communion. Not all of the following churches are member churches of the WMC. The largest Methodist denomination, the United Methodist Church, had about 25 percent of their churches disaffiliate between 2019 and 2023, some of whom joined the Global Methodist Church.

- United Methodist Church – 7.9 million
- Global Methodist Church - 1.3 million
- Church of the Nazarene – 2.7 million
- African Methodist Episcopal Church – 2.5 million
- Methodist Church Nigeria – 2 million
- The Salvation Army – 1.8 million
- Methodist Church of Southern Africa – 1.7 million
- African Methodist Episcopal Zion Church – 1.4 million
- Korean Methodist Church – 1.1 million
- United Methodist Church of Ivory Coast – 1.0 million
- Free Methodist Church – 0.9 million
- Christian Methodist Episcopal Church – 0.9 million
- Methodist Church Ghana – 0.8 million
- Methodist Church in India – 0.6 million
- Methodist Church in Kenya – 0.5 million
- Global Methodist Church – 0.4 million
- Wesleyan Church – 0.4 million
- Methodist Church in Brazil – 0.2 million
- Methodist Church of Fiji and Rotuma – 0.2 million

==== Adventism – 24 million ====
- Seventh-day Adventist Church – 23.6 million
- Church of God (Seventh Day) – 0.2 million
- Advent Christian Church – 0.1 million
- Seventh Day Adventist Reform Movement – 0.042 million

==== Restoration Movement – 4 million ====
- Churches of Christ – 2 million
- Christian churches and churches of Christ – 1.1 million
- Community of Disciples of Christ in Congo – 0.7 million
- Christian Church (Disciples of Christ) – 0.3 million

==== Anabaptism – 4 million ====
- Mennonites – 2.1 million
- Schwarzenau Brethren (German Baptists) – 1.5 million
- Amish – 0.4 million
- Hutterites – 0.05 million

==== Plymouth Brethren – 3.4 million ====
- Open Brethren – 3.3 million
  - International Brethren Conferences on Mission – 3.25 million
- Exclusive Brethren – 0.1 million
  - Plymouth Brethren Christian Church – 0.05 million
  - Darbyists – 0.04 million

==== Hussites – 1.2 million ====
- Moravian Church – 1.1 million
- Czechoslovak Hussite Church – 0.099 million
- Unity of the Brethren Baptists – 0.035 million

==== Quakers – 0.4 million ====
Worldwide distribution of Quakers by country in 2017 according to the Friends World Committee for Consultation: No data 1–99 100-999 1,000–3,999 4,000–9,999 10,000–119,285

- Friends World Committee for Consultation – 0.4 million
  - Evangelical Friends Church International – 0.2 million
  - Friends United Meeting – 0.17 million
  - Friends General Conference – 0.03 million

==== Shakers – 3 ====
- United Society of Believers in Christ's Second Appearing

=== Modern Protestantism – 400–500 million ===
The denominations listed below did not emerge from the Protestant Reformation of the 16th century or its commonly acknowledged offshoots. Instead, they are broadly linked to Pentecostalism or similar other independent evangelical and revivalistic movements that originated in the beginning of the 20th century. For this reason, several sources tend to differentiate them from Protestants and classify them together as Independents, Non-core Protestants etc. Also included in this category are the numerous, yet very similar non-denominational churches. Nonetheless, most sources combine their numbers to the Protestant tally, while others do not since these churches do not self-identify with mainline Protestant traditions. Despite the absence of centralized control or leadership, if considered as a single cohort, this will easily be the second largest Christian tradition after Roman Catholicism. According to the Center for the Study of Global Christianity (CSGC), there are an estimated 450 million Independents world-wide, as of mid-2019.

==== Pentecostalism – 200–280 million ====
Those who are members of the Pentecostal denomination number around 280 million people.

- Assemblies of God – 86 million (the fifth largest Christian communion)
- Apostolic Church – 15 million
- International Circle of Faith – 11 million
- China Gospel Fellowship – 10 million
- Fangcheng Fellowship – 10 million
- Universal Church of the Kingdom of God – 9.9 million
- Church of God (Cleveland, Tennessee) – 9.2 million
- Foursquare Church – 9 million
- Ethiopian Kale Heywet Church – 9 million
- Church of God in Christ – 6.5 million
- Ethiopian Full Gospel Believers' Church – 4.5 million
- The Church of Pentecost – 4.2 million
- International Pentecostal Holiness Church – 4 million
- Indonesian Bethel Church – 3 million
- The Pentecostal Mission – 2.5 million
- Christian Congregation in Brazil – 2.3 million
- Church of God of Prophecy – 1.5 million
- Heal Our Land – 1.5 million
- Pentecostal Church in Indonesia – 1.5 million
- Apostolic Faith Mission of South Africa – 1.2 million
- God is Love Pentecostal Church – +1 million
- Association of Pentecostal Churches of Rwanda – 1 million
- Jesus Is Lord Church Worldwide – 1 million
- Maranatha Christian Church – 0.75 million
- Pentecostal Church of God – 0.5 million
- Indian Pentecostal Church of God – 0.5 million
- Association of Vineyard Churches – 0.3 million
- Worldwide Church of God's Power – 0.3 million

==== Non-denominational Christianity – 35–50 million ====
- Calvary Chapel Association – 25 million
- Alliance World Fellowship – 6 million
- Born Again Movement – 3 million
- Church of God (Anderson, Indiana) – 1.2 million

==== African initiated churches – 45–60 million ====
60 million people are members of African initiated churches.

- Zion Christian Church – 15 million
- Cherubim and Seraphim – 10 million
- Kimbanguist Church – 5.5 million
- Redeemed Christian Church of God – 5 million
- Church of the Lord (Aladura) – 3.6 million
- Council of African Instituted Churches – 3 million
- Church of Christ Light of the Holy Spirit – 1.4 million
- African Church of the Holy Spirit – 0.7 million
- African Israel Church Nineveh – 0.5 million

==== Chinese Patriotic Christian Churches – 38 million ====
Source

==== New Apostolic Church – 8 million ====
The New Apostolic Church has around 8 million members.

==== Messianic Judaism – 0.3 million ====
Messianic Judaism has a membership of 0.3 million people.

=== Eastern Protestant Christianity – 22 million ===
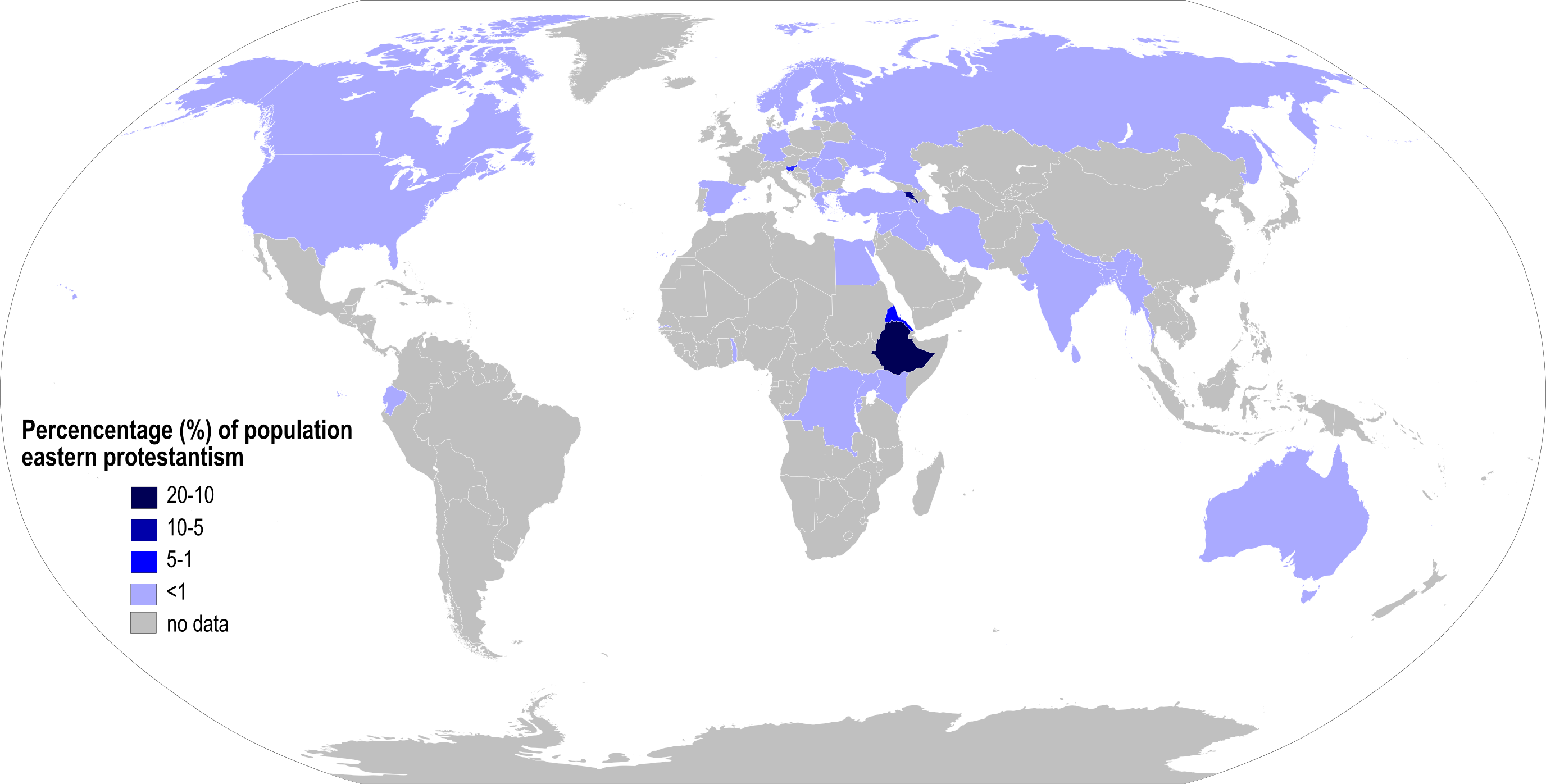
Eastern Protestantism, percentage by country

Eastern Protestant Christianity (or Eastern Reformed Christianity) encompasses a range of heterogeneous Protestant Christian denominations that developed outside of the Occident, from the latter half of the nineteenth century and yet keeps elements of Eastern Christianity, to varying degrees. Most of these denominations came into being when existing Protestant Churches adopted reformational variants of Eastern Orthodox liturgy and worship; while others are the result of reformations of Eastern Orthodox beliefs and practices, inspired by the teachings of Western Protestant missionaries. Some Protestant Eastern Churches are in communion with similar Western Protestant Churches. However, Protestant Eastern Christianity within itself, does not constitute a single communion. This is due to the diverse polities, practices, liturgies and orientations of the denominations which fall under this category.

- Ethiopian–Eritrean Evangelical Church – 16.5 million, Alexandrian Rite
- Believers Eastern Church – 3.5 million, West Syrian Rite
- Mar Thoma Syrian Church – 1 million, Syro-Antiochene Rite (in communion with the Anglican Communion)
- Armenian Evangelical Church – 0.25 million, Armenian Rite
- St. Thomas Evangelical Church of India – 0.1 million, Syro-Antiochene Rite
- Evangelical Church of the Augsburg Confession in Slovenia – 0.02 million, Byzantine Rite
- Evangelical Church of Romania – 0.16 million, Byzantine Rite
- Kosovo Protestant Evangelical Church – 0.15 million, Byzantine Rite

== Eastern Orthodoxy – 170- 220 million ==
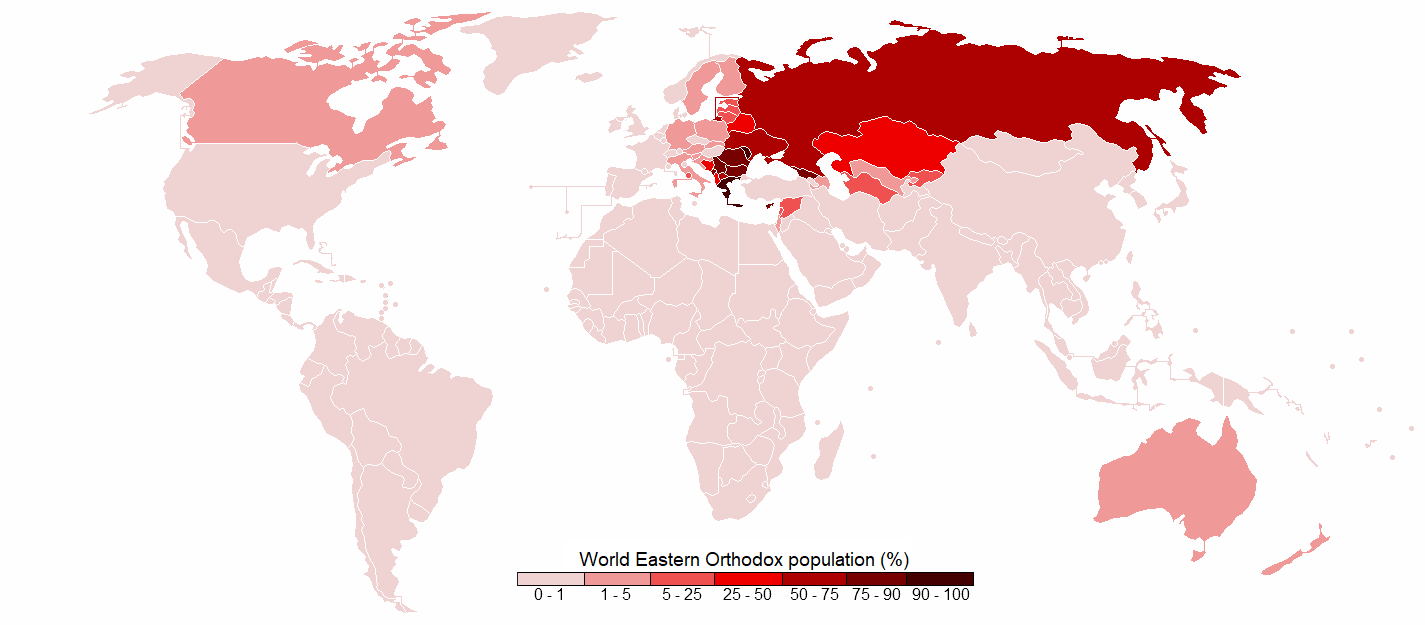
A map of Eastern Orthodoxy by population percentage

Eastern Orthodox Christians account for 220 million worldwide. Its main body consists of the various autocephalous churches along with the autonomous and other churches canonically linked to them, for the most part form a single communion, making the Eastern Orthodox Church the second largest single denomination behind the Catholic Church. In addition, there are several Eastern Orthodox splinter groups and non-universally recognized churches.

=== Autocephalous churches – 170 million ===
- Russian Orthodox Church – 110 million
- Romanian Orthodox Church –18 million
- Church of Greece – 10 million
- Serbian Orthodox Church – 8–12 million
- Bulgarian Orthodox Church – 7–8 million
- Ecumenical Patriarchate of Constantinople – 5.45 million
- Greek Orthodox Patriarchate of Antioch – 4.3 million
- Georgian Orthodox Church – 3.5 million
- Greek Orthodox Patriarchate of Alexandria – 0.5–1.5 million
- Macedonian Orthodox Church – 2 million
- Church of Cyprus – 0.7 million
- Polish Orthodox Church – 0.6 million
- Albanian Orthodox Church – 0.5 million
- Greek Orthodox Patriarchate of Jerusalem – 0.4 million
- Orthodox Church of the Czech Lands and Slovakia – 0.075 million

=== Autonomous churches – 3.5 million ===
- Metropolitan Church of Chișinău and All Moldova (Moscow Patriarchate) – about 2.6 million
- Russian Orthodox Church Outside of Russia – about 0.4 million
- Metropolitan Church of Bessarabia (Moldova) (Romanian Patriarchate) – about 0.2 million
- Estonian Orthodox Church of the Moscow Patriarchate – about 0.15 million
- Orthodox Church of Finland (Ecumenical Patriarchate) – about 0.06 million
- Chinese Orthodox Church (Moscow Patriarchate) – about 0.015 million
- Orthodox Church in Japan (Moscow Patriarchate) – about 0.009 million
- Estonian Apostolic Orthodox Church (Ecumenical Patriarchate of Constantinople) – about 0.02 million

=== Non-universally recognised churches – 26 million ===
- Orthodox Church of Ukraine – 21 million (recognized its autocephaly by four churches, not recognized by most all other churches)
- Ukrainian Orthodox Church (Moscow Patriarchate) – 5 million (recognized as self-governing church under the Moscow Patriarchate by majority of the churches; rival church to OCU by four churches and the Ukrainian government; declared independence from the MP in 2022 which is yet to be acknowledged by these churches)
- Orthodox Church in America – 0.09 million (recognized by all churches, partially recognized autocephaly)
- Latvian Orthodox Church – 0.37 million (recognized as a self-governing church under the Moscow Patriarchate by all churches; disputed autocephaly)

=== Non-canonical churches – 3 million ===
- Belarusian Autocephalous Orthodox Church – 2.4 million
- Orthodox Church of Greece (Holy Synod in Resistance) – 0.75 million
- Old Calendar Bulgarian Orthodox Church – 0.45 million
- Orthodox Church in Italy – 0.12 million
- Old Calendar Orthodox Church of Romania – 0.05 million
- Montenegrin Orthodox Church – 0.05 million
- Autocephalous Turkish Orthodox Patriarchate – 0.047 million

=== Other separated groups – 4 million ===
- Old Believers – 2–2.5 million
- Old Calendarists – 2 million

== Oriental Orthodoxy – 70 million ==
A map of Oriental Orthodoxy by population percentage

The Oriental Orthodox Churches are those descended from those that rejected the Council of Chalcedon in 451. Despite the similar name, they are therefore a different branch of Christianity from the Eastern Orthodox (see above). There are an estimated 70 million Oriental Orthodox Christians worldwide.

=== Autocephalous churches – 62 –70 million ===
- Ethiopian Orthodox Tewahedo Church – 42-47 million
- Coptic Orthodox Church – 10 million
- Armenian Apostolic Church – 9 million
  - Mother See of Holy Etchmiadzin – 6 million
  - Holy See of Cilicia – 0.3 million
  - Armenian Patriarchate of Constantinople – 0.095 million
  - Armenian Patriarchate of Jerusalem – 0.034 million
- Eritrean Orthodox Tewahedo Church – 2 million
- Malankara Orthodox Syrian Church – 2 million
- Syriac Orthodox Church – 1.4 million
  - Jacobite Syrian Christian Church – 1.2 million

=== Autonomous churches ===
- French Coptic Orthodox Church – 0.01 million

=== Churches not in communion ===
- Malabar Independent Syrian Church – 0.06 million
- British Orthodox Church – 0.01 million
- Albanian-Udi Church – 0.006 million

== Nontrinitarian Restorationism – 42–62 million ==
Distribution of other Christians

A sixth group is composed by Nontrinitarian Restorationists. These groups are predominantly unitarian and are quite distinct from orthodox Trinitarian restorationist groups such as the Disciples of Christ, despite some shared history.

=== Oneness Pentecostalism – 10-30 million ===
- United Pentecostal Church International – 5.8 million
- Pentecostal Assemblies of the World – 2 million
- True Jesus Church – 1.5–3 million
- IEANJESUS – 0.2 million
- Apostolic Assembly of the Faith in Christ Jesus – 0.2 million

=== Latter Day Saint movement or Mormonism – 17 million ===
- The Church of Jesus Christ of Latter-day Saints – 17 million
- Community of Christ – 0.25 million (Trinitarian Mormonism)
- The Church of Jesus Christ (Bickertonite), Headquartered in Monongahela, PA - 22,992

=== Jehovah's Witnesses – 9 million ===
Source

=== Minor denominations – 6 million ===
- Iglesia ni Cristo – 3+ million
- La Luz del Mundo – 1–5 million (see La Luz del Mundo#Membership statistics)
- Unification Church (aka Moonies) – 1–2 million
  - World Peace and Unification Sanctuary Church – 0.003 million
- Church of Christ, 4th Watch – 0.6 million
- Church of Christ, Scientist – 0.1 million
- World Mission Society Church of God – 0.1 million
- Friends of Man – 0.07 million
- Christadelphians – 0.05 million
- The Family International – 0.01 million

== Independent Catholicism – 19 million ==
Various denominations that self-identify as Catholic, despite not being affiliated with the Catholic Church.

- Philippine Independent Church – 6 million (in communion with the Anglican Communion)
- Catholic Patriotic Association – 5 million
- Apostolic Catholic Church – 5 million
- Traditionalist Mexican-American Catholic Church – 2 million
- Society of Saint Pius X – 1 million
- Brazilian Catholic Apostolic Church – 0.56 million
- Mariavite Church – 0.4 million
  - Old Catholic Mariavite Church in North America – 0.35
  - Old Catholic Mariavite Church (Płock rite) – 0.02
    - French province of Old Catholic Mariavite Church – 0.005
  - Catholic Mariavite Church (Felicjanów rite) – 0.002
    - Catholic Mariavite Church in Cameroon – 0.002
    - Catholic Mariavite Church in France
- Union of Utrecht of the Old Catholic Churches – 0.1 million (in communion with the Anglican Communion)
  - Polish-Catholic Church in the Republic of Poland – 0.02 million
  - Catholic Diocese of the Old Catholics in Germany – 0.02 million
  - Old Catholic Church of the Netherlands – 0.01 million
  - Christian Catholic Church of Switzerland – 0.01 million
  - Old Catholic Church of Austria – 0.005 million
  - Old Catholic Church of the Czech Republic – 0.003 million
- Union of Scranton – 0.03 million
  - Polish National Catholic Church – 0.03 million
  - Nordic Catholic Church
- Palmarian Christian Church – 0.002 million
- Sedevacantists
  - Congregation of Mary Immaculate Queen
  - Society of Saint Pius V

== Assyrian churches – 0.6 million ==
A seventh group is composed of independent churches descended from the historic Church of the East. Internal crises beginning the 16th-19th centuries eventually resulted by 1830 in the original patriarchal line of the Church of the East (Eliya-line) becoming the heads of the Chaldean Catholic Church (an Eastern Catholic Church in communion with the Holy See formed in 1552), and the emergence of a separate patriarch presiding over a distinct Assyrian Church of the East.

The Assyrian Church of the East experienced a schism in 1964 following reform attempts at modernisation and other measures, resulting in the organisation of the Ancient Church of the East.

- Assyrian Church of the East – 0.5 million
  - Chaldean Syrian Church – 0.01 million
- Ancient Church of the East – 0.1 million

== Binitarianism – 0.04 million ==
- United Church of God – 0.015 million
- General Conference of the Church of God (Seventh Day) – 0.014 million
- Living Church of God – 0.011 million

== See also ==
- Schism in Christianity
- List of Christian denominations
- List of current Christian leaders
- List of the largest Protestant denominations
- List of largest church buildings
