= La Luz del Mundo =

Nontrinitarian Christian denomination

Coordinates: 20°40′19.02″N 103°17′2.76″W

Church of the Living God, Pillar and Ground of the Truth, The Light of the World
- Iglesia del Dios Vivo, Columna y Apoyo de la Verdad, La Luz del Mundo
- Flagship Temple of La Luz del Mundo Church
- Classification: Restorationist (Christian primitivism)
- Orientation: Charismatic
- Theology: Nontrinitarian
- Structure: Hierarchical
- Leader: Naasón Joaquín García
- Region: 58 countries as of August 2018
- Headquarters: Guadalajara, Jalisco, Mexico
- Founder: Aarón Joaquín González
- Origin: 6 April 1926; Monterrey, Nuevo León, Mexico. Iglesia del Dios Vivo, Columna y Apoyo de la Verdad.
- Congregations: 2,869 as of August 2013
- Members: Between 1 and 5 million. See Statistics
- Other names: Spanish: La Luz del Mundo; LLDM; LDM; Iglesia La Luz del Mundo; ILLM English: La Luz del Mundo Church; Church of the Living God, Pillar and Ground of the Truth, The Light of the World; The Light of the World Church
- Official website: www.lldm.org

The Iglesia del Dios Vivo, Columna y Apoyo de la Verdad, La Luz del Mundo (Spanish: [iˈɣlesja ðel ˈdjos ˈβiβo koˈlumnaj aˈpoʝo ðe la βeɾˈðað la ˈlus ðel ˈmundo]; English: "Church of the Living God, Pillar and Ground of the Truth, The Light of the World")—or simply La Luz del Mundo (LLDM)—is a Christian denomination in the nontrinitarian tradition, with its international headquarters in Guadalajara, Jalisco, Mexico. La Luz del Mundo practices a form of Restorationist theology centered on three leaders: Aarón—born Eusebio—Joaquín González, Samuel Joaquín Flores, and Naasón Joaquín García, who are regarded by the church as modern-day apostles of Jesus Christ.

La Luz del Mundo was founded in 1926 during the Mexican Cristero War, a struggle between the secular, anti-clerical government and Catholic rebels. The conflict centered in the west-central states like Jalisco, where Aarón Joaquín focused his missionary efforts. Given the environment of the time, the Church remained a small missionary endeavor until 1934, when it built its first temple. Thereafter, it continued to grow and expand, interrupted by an internal schism in 1942. Aarón Joaquín was succeeded by his son Samuel upon his death, who was in turn succeeded by his own son Naasón upon his death. The Church is present in more than 50 countries and has claimed to have between 1 and 5 million adherents worldwide.

La Luz del Mundo describes itself as the restoration of primitive Christianity. It does not use crosses or religious images in its worship services. Female members follow a dress code that includes long skirts and use head coverings during services. Although the Church does not allow women to hold leadership positions in its religious hierarchy, women hold leadership positions in church public relations and church-operated civil organizations.

The three church leaders have faced accusations of sexual abuse. In June 2019, church leader Naasón Joaquín García was arrested at Los Angeles International Airport and charged with sex crimes by the California Department of Justice. On June 8, 2022, he pled guilty to three charges concerning the sexual abuse of children and was sentenced to a maximum 16 years and 8 months in prison.

== Name ==
The full name of the Church in Spanish is Iglesia del Dios Vivo, Columna y Apoyo de la Verdad, La Luz del Mundo, which translates to Church of the Living God, Pillar and Ground of The Truth, The Light of the World. The name of the Church is derived from two passages in the Bible: 1 Timothy 3:15 and Matthew 5:14.

But if I tarry long, that thou mayest know how thou oughtest to behave thyself in the house of God, which is the church of the living God, the pillar and ground of the truth.

— 1 Timothy 3:15, King James Version (KJV) (emphasis added)

Ye are the light of the world. A city that is set on an hill cannot be hid.

— Matthew 5:14, King James Version (KJV) (emphasis added)

== History ==
=== Historical background ===
Eusebio Joaquín González was born on August 14, 1896, in Colotlán, Jalisco, Mexico. At a young age, he joined the Constitutional Army during the Mexican Revolution. While he was on leave with his father in Guadalajara in 1920, he met Elisa Flores, also from Colotlán, whom he later married. While stationed in the state of Coahuila in 1926, he came into contact with ascetic preachers of the Iglesia Cristiana Espiritual who used the pseudonyms Saulo and Silas (after Saul and Silas in the New Testament). Their pair, whose real names were Antonio Muñez and Francisco Flores, had become preachers only two years prior, and their teachings forbade followers from keeping good hygiene and wear regular clothes.

Sources about the lives of Muñez and Flores are secondary and often contradictory; according to Gaxiola, the two caused scandals among the early Apostolic Pentecostals. They preached of prophecies, visions, and dreams which they claimed gave them spiritual authority instead of the Bible, which was not widely read in early 20th-century Mexico. However, the obituary of Eusebio Joaquín González in the Crónica Jalisco states that "Eusebio started to attend the reunions of preachers by the name Saul and Silas. He convinced his wife to go with him. The attitude and customs of these people surprised Eusebio. They didn't drink, they treated each other with the utmost respect, they studied the Bible, and they put in practice the words of the holy scriptures." After being baptized by the two itinerant preachers, Aarón Joaquín resigned from the army, and along with his wife became domestic workers to the two preachers.

History from multiple religious sources (i.e. La Luz del Mundo, Iglesia Cristiana Evangélica Espiritual and El Buen Pastor) all agree that around his conversion, or soon after, Aarón Joaquín had met oneness Pentecostal pastor Francisco Borrego, whose he called his "father in the faith", for having instructed him in doctrine, notably baptism in the name of Jesus Christ. According to La Luz del Mundo's Vida y obra del Apostol Aaron Juaquin (1997), He had been converted in the "Iglesia Apostólica de la Fe en Cristo Jesús".

On the name of Borrego's movement, witnesses from an LLDM book recalled "Francisco Borrego, who because of a deliberate question by Mr. Joaquín over the origin and social meaning behind this organization, his response was that this community was known as Iglesia Cristiana Espiritual" (Spiritual Christian Church). This explanation was the one given by Juaquin when asked about his affiliation by church members in Guadalajara. It was retold by José María González in his 1956 introduction of the Constitución de La Iglesia del Buen Pastor after splitting from what would become La Luz del Mundo.

In the 1920s, Mexico underwent a period of instability under the administration of Plutarco Elías Calles, who was seeking to limit the influence of the Catholic Church to modernize and centralize the state within the religious sphere of Mexican society. To protest Calles's policies, the Catholic Church suspended all religious services, bringing about an uprising in Mexico. This uprising, or Cristero War, lasted from 1926 to 1929 and reemerged in the 1930s.

On April 6, 1926, Aarón Joaquín had a vision in which God changed his name from Eusebio to Aarón and told him to leave Monterrey, where he and his wife served Saulo and Silas. On his journey, he preached near the entrances of Catholic churches—often facing religious persecution—until he arrived at Guadalajara on December 12, 1926. The Cristero Wars impacted both Catholic and non-Catholic congregations and preachers, especially evangelical movements. Small movements were attacked by the government and the Cristeros, resulting in a hostile environment for Aarón Joaquín's work.

=== Early years ===
While working as a shoe vendor, Aarón Joaquín formed a group of ten worshipers who met at his wife's apartment. He began constructing the Church's hierarchy by instituting the first two deaconesses, Elisa Flores and Francisca Cuevas. Later he charged the first minister to oversee fourteen congregations in Ameca, Jalisco. During these early years in late 1920s, Aarón Joaquín traveled to the states of Michoacán, Nayarit, and Sinaloa to preach.

In 1931, the first Santa Cena (Holy Supper) was held to commemorate the crucifixion of Jesus. The Church met in rural areas, fearing complaints from Catholic neighbors. Urbanization contributed migrants from the countryside who added a significant number of members to the Church.

In 1934, a temple was built in Sector Libertad of Guadalajara's urban zone and members were encouraged to buy homes in the same neighborhood, thereby establishing a community. The temple was registered as Iglesia Cristiana Espiritual (Spiritual Christian Church), the church Aarón had been baptized in, but Aarón Joaquín claimed to have received God's word in the dedication of the temple, saying that it was "light of the world" and that they were the Iglesia del Dios Vivo, Columna y Apoyo de la Verdad (Church of the Living God, Pillar and Ground of the Truth). The Church used the latter name to identify itself.

In 1939, it moved to a new meeting place at 12 de Octubre street in San Antonio in southeast Guadalajara, forming its second small community which was populated mainly by its members. The community was formed to escape a hostile religious environment. It was not designed as an egalitarian society.

In 1937, La Luz del Mundo officially split from the Iglesia Cristiana Evangélica Espiritual, successor of the Iglesia Cristiana Espiritual, and of the Consejo Mexicano de La Fe Apostólica, a movement born out to the confusion of the Iglesia Apostólica de la Fe en Cristo Jesús.

Francisco Borrego, the Pastor General of the movement at the time, wanted to know the doctrine being preached in Guadalajara. His disagreements with Aarón led to a split due to said doctrine. This is mentioned by José Maria González R. in his 1956 writing on the brief history of LLDM before the 1942 schism (in the introduction to the Iglesia del Buen Pastor's church constitution). The name of the church was changed to Iglesia Cristiana Espiritual La Luz del Mundo (Spiritual Christian Church the Light of the World) to distinguish it from its previous denomination, and it was the legal name of LLDM until the 1990s.

In 1938, Aarón Joaquín returned to Monterrey to preach to his former associates. There he learned that he had been baptized using the Trinitarian formula and not in the name of Jesus Christ as he preached. His re-baptism in the name of Christ by his collaborator Lino Figueroa marked Aarón Joaquín's separation from the rest of the Pentecostal community.

=== Schism of 1942 ===
In August 1942, during its most significant schism, at least 250 members left La Luz del Mundo. Tensions began to build after Aarón Joaquín's birthday, when the congregation in Guadalajara gave him gifts of flowers and perfume and sang hymns celebrating his birthday. Having received word, this celebration generated a heated debate that culminated with the defection of three LLDM congregations in Mexico City, Cuautla, and San Pedro Totoltepec, and two missions in Cuernavaca and Ciudad Madero, with most of their members, including their pastors. The issue was brought up whether the birthday of the "servant of God" should be celebrated, along with the celebration of birthdays in general, according to New Testament texts on banquets.

LLDM's 2008 book Hechos del Apóstol Aarón (Acts of the Apostle Aarón) states the following in chapter 6, in the section titled la División:

There were some pastors who for some time had wanted to separate from the church, and had begun to plant the foundation for the argument of Aarón's corruption with the following harangue, "Why does brother Aarón accept that people sing him hymns in honor of his birthday? Why does he accept flowers? Where in doctrine does it states that neckties should be worn? Should the church of God accept doctors and medics? Should birthdays be celebrated in the church of God?" At the end they [the pastors] said, "What a perfect work, what marvelous act has God done for us! He brought us from impurity, from sin, from injustices, from evil. For love of him we left properties, families, commodities... we've done good leaving everything for Jesus Christ... brothers... and if Aarón were corrupted... would we consent his sin? -NOOO! Shouted the church, having been deceived by these traitors. And they added; -"we will continue to defend the holy and pure doctrine unto death". In the following Sunday School meeting, these pastors announced from their ministry - "Aarón has been corrupted, Aarón has been corrupted." The questions they threw at the church were without foundation, the dissidents weaved a tangled web of false arguments, to arrive at the false accusation, the dishonor, the confrontation, and attacking the prestige of the servant of God.

Anthropologist Renée de la Torre described this schism as a power struggle in which Aarón Joaquín was accused of having enriched himself at the expense of the faithful. Church dissidents took to local newspaper El Occidental to accuse church members of committing immoralities with young women. Aarón Joaquín was accused by dissidents of adultery with a young woman, Guadalupe Avelar, back in around 1938, and supposedly fathered a boy by the name of Abel Avelar, later Abel Joaquín Avelar, who become the apostle of his own "Iglesia de Jesucristo" as an adult, who Joaquín recognized later in his life..

According to Esbozo Histórico de la Iglesia del Buen Pastor, Avelar had confided in the dissidents and had become a part of them. Some of the accusations were aimed to close down a temple that the Church used with government permission. Members of La Luz del Mundo attribute this episode to the envy and ambition of the dissidents and their leader, who formed their own group called "la Iglesia del Dios Vivo, Columna y Apoyo de la Verdad, El Buen Pastor" ("The Church of the Living God, Pillar and Ground of the Truth, The Good Shepherd") under the leadership of José María González, the pastor in Colonia Vallejo, Mexico City, with doctrines and practices similar to those of La Luz del Mundo.

Their leader is considered a prophet of God. Their current leader is bishop president Pablo Aguilar Figueroa. As of 2010, El Buen Pastor has a membership of 17,700 in Mexico. Among those who defected to El Buen Pastor was Lino Figueroa, the pastor who had re-baptized Aarón Joaquín in 1938. Others include pastors José Isabel Acevedo from San Pedro Totoltepec, Vicente Martínez from Cuautla, and Domingo Vega from Cuernavaca.

The 14 August celebration of Aarón Joaquín’s birthday became an annual church tradition, with all ministers being required to attend the mother church in Guadalajara. This custom eventually merged with the Santa Cena after Aarón's death, which before had been observed around December/January for New Year.

LLDM's Hechos del Apóstol Aarón states that Joaquín had been foretold of a heavy trail at the beginning of that year, only to bear much fruit in the end. In July 1943, Aarón Joaquín had a vision where the baptism by Figueroa, who had defected to El Buen Pastor, was invalidated and he was ordered to re-baptize himself invoking Jesus' name. The whole congregation was re-baptized, as not doing so would lead to excommunication, as now Aarón Joaquín was the source of baptismal legitimacy and authenticity. With all those who had challenged him gone, Aarón Joaquín was able to consolidate leadership of La Luz del Mundo.

=== Hermosa Provincia ===
In 1952, Aarón Joaquín purchased a lot of land outside the city and called it Hermosa Provincia (Beautiful Province), with the intent of forming a small community made up exclusively of church members. The land was then sold at reduced prices to church members. The community included most necessities; services provided in Hermosa Provincia included health, education, and other urban services, which were provided in full after six years partly with help that the Church received from municipal and non-municipal authorities.

This dependency upon outside assistance to obtain public services ended by 1959 when residents formed the Association of Colonists of Hermosa Provincia, which was used to directly petition the government. Hermosa Provincia received official recognition from the city for being the only neighborhood that had eliminated illiteracy by the early 1970s. The neighborhood became a standard model for the Church, which has replicated it in many cities in Mexico and other countries.

Aarón Joaquín started missionary efforts in Central America and by the early 1960s, La Luz del Mundo had 64 congregations and 35 missions. By 1964, after his death, the Church had between 20,000 and 30,000 members spread through five countries, including Mexico.

=== Church expansion and growth ===
Samuel Joaquín Flores was born on February 14, 1937, the youngest of eight siblings. He became the leader of La Luz del Mundo at the age of 27 after the death of his father. He continued his father's desire for international expansion by traveling outside of Mexico extensively. In August 1964, he first visited church members in the Mexican state of Michoacán, and later that year went to Los Angeles on a missionary trip. In 1967, its first small temple in Hermosa Provincia was demolished and replaced by a larger one. By 1970, the Church had expanded to Costa Rica, Colombia, and Guatemala.

With Samuel Joaquín's work, La Luz del Mundo became integrated into Guadalajara and the Church replicated the model of Hermosa Provincia in many cities in Mexico and abroad. By 1972, there were approximately 72,000 members of the Church, which increased to 1.5 million in 1986 and to 4 million in 1993. Anthropologist Patricia Fortuny says that the Church's growth can be attributed to several factors, including its social benefits, which "improves the living conditions of believers."

Samuel Joaquín oversaw the construction of schools, hospitals and other social services. Between 1990 and 2010, the Church expanded to countries including the United Kingdom, the Netherlands, Switzerland, Ethiopia and Israel. By the end of Samuel Joaquín's ministry, La Luz del Mundo was present in fifty countries. After fifty years at the head of La Luz del Mundo, Samuel Joaquín died in his home on December 8, 2014.

On December 14, 2014, Naasón Joaquín García, the fifth out of eight Joaquín children, became the leader of La Luz del Mundo upon the death of his father. Naasón Joaquín was born on May 7, 1969, in Guadalajara. He pre served as a church minister for 22 years, during which time he launched Berea Internacional, the church's media and publishing arm. Under his leadership the church has expanded to eight additional countries.

== Beliefs and practices ==
=== Worship ===
In worship services, men and women sit separately, with men on the right and women on the left from the preacher’s point of view. The Church does not use musical instruments during its worship services. There is no dancing or clapping. Women cover their heads with a veil during services. Hymns are sung a cappella. Members listen to instrumental music and some compose their own music. When singing, all congregants sing at the same time to maintain uniformity during their meetings. La Luz del Mundo believes that worship should be done "spiritually" and only to God, and thus temples are devoid of images, saints, crosses, and anything that might be considered idolatry. The places of worship have plain walls and wide, clear windows.

The Church holds three daily prayer meetings during the week, with two meetings on Sundays and one regular consecration. On Sunday mornings, congregants meet at the temple for Sunday school, which begins with prayers and hymns. After that, the preacher—usually a minister—presides over a talk during which he reads from the Bible and presents the material to be covered throughout the week. During the talk, it is common for members of either sex to read a cited verse from the Bible.

At the end of the talk, more hymns and prayers are recited, and voluntary donations are given. Sunday evening services begin with hymns and prayers, after which members of the congregation of both sexes recite from the Bible or sing hymns. A shorter talk is held with the aim of deepening the Sunday school's talk.

La Luz del Mundo holds three scheduled prayer meetings each day. The first daily prayer meeting is at 5:00 a.m. and usually lasts one hour. The service includes a talk that is meant to recall the material covered in Sunday school. The 9:00 a.m. prayer was started by Aarón Joaquín's wife, Elisa Flores. A female church member presides over the prayer meeting, which includes a talk. The evening prayer has the same structure as the 5:00 a.m. meeting. In each prayer meeting, members are expected to be prepared with their Bibles, hymn books, and notebooks and to be consecrated.

=== Bible ===
Members of La Luz del Mundo believe that the Bible is the only source of Christian doctrine. It is the main source of ministers' and laypersons' talks during prayer meetings. Through organizational arrangements, such as Sunday school, church authorities attempt to maintain uniformity of teachings and beliefs throughout all congregations. The Bible is the only historical reference church members use during religious services. Members can find cited Bible verses quickly, regardless of their level of education. It is also seen as the only and "sufficient rules of faith for salvation."

=== Restorationism ===
La Luz del Mundo teaches that there was no salvation on Earth between the death of the last Apostle (Apostle John) around 96 AD and the calling of Aarón Joaquín in 1926. Members believe that the Church itself was founded by Jesus Christ approximately two thousand years ago and that after the deaths of the Apostles, the church became corrupt and was lost. La Luz del Mundo claims that through Aarón Joaquín, it is the restoration of the primitive Christian church that was lost during the formation of the Catholic Church. After those times passed, the beginning of Aarón Joaquín's ministry is seen as the restoration of the original Christian Church. Salvation can be attained in the Church by following the Bible-based teachings of their leader.

=== Calling of the Servants of God ===
La Luz del Mundo believes its apostles are directly chosen and sent by God to "preach the will of God and Salvation". It believes that God called Aarón Joaquín to restore the primitive Christian Church. Aarón Joaquín was succeeded by his son Samuel upon his death in 1964. Samuel was succeeded by his son Naasón upon his death in 2014. Although Church leadership has remained in the Joaquín family since its founding, La Luz del Mundo maintains that succession of power is by divine calling, not by kinship.

La Luz del Mundo teaches that it is the only true Christian church founded by Jesus Christ because it is led by Naasón Joaquín, whom it considers the only true servant of God and Apostle of Jesus Christ in this era. Members believe that this Apostolic authority allows them to find peace, feel close to God and attain meaning in their lives from the hopes of joining with Christ to reign with him for eternity.

=== Christology ===
La Luz del Mundo rejects the doctrine of the Trinity as a later addition to Christian theology. It believes in a "one and universal" God and in Jesus Christ, who is the "Son of God and Savior of the world" rather than part of a trinity. God is worshiped "by essence", whereas Jesus Christ is worshiped "by commandment." By worshiping Christ they are also worshiping God through him, according to their teachings. The Church preaches baptism in the name of Jesus Christ for forgiveness of sins, and baptism with the Holy Spirit as confirmation from God for entrance into heaven.

=== Role of women ===
Female congregants of La Luz del Mundo do not wear jewelry, makeup, or have short hair. They are taught to dress modestly, which means wearing long dresses and skirts. These restrictions do not apply to recreational activities, such as swimming. Women wear a head covering during religious meetings.

According to an interview with one adherent, women in La Luz del Mundo are considered equal to men in social spheres and have equal capacities for obtaining higher education, social careers and other goals that may interest them. They are not allowed to become ministers or serve in major leadership roles within the Church. Women are taught to submit to their husbands.

Aarón Joaquín established the 9 a.m. prayer after hearing about one of his followers who was being abused by her Catholic husband. This prayer became one led by women. These prayers are seen as a religious activity equal to all other activities, and provide space for empowerment in which women can express themselves and develop a status within the congregation's membership. Anthropologist Fortuny said, concerning the 9 a.m. prayer, that "I infer from this that, if the membership considers this as [a] female [gathering], they would be giving authority to women in the religious or ecclesiastical framework of the ritual, and this then [would] put [them] on a plane of equality or [in] absence of subordination to men."

Church women personalize their attire. Rebozos are worn by indigenous members and specially designed veils by other female members. Fortuny says that "wearing long skirts does not negate the meaning of being a woman and, although it underlines the difference between men and women, [female members] say that it does not make them feel like inferior human beings". Female members say the Church's dress code makes them feel they are honoring God and that it is part of their "essence".

Fortuny states that dress codes are a sign of a patriarchal organization because men are only forbidden from growing their hair long or wearing shorts in public, and also that women, at times, can be more autonomous than those in the general population in Mexico. Fortuny says that the growing trend of educated women having husbands in supporting roles is also seen in both the Guadalajara and Houston, Texas, congregations. Many young female members said they wanted to undergo post-secondary education, and some told Fortuny they were degree students. Both young men and women are equally encouraged to enter post-compulsory education. Male members are more likely than their mothers to direct their daughters towards attending university.

La Luz del Mundo does not practice ordination of women. Women can become missionaries or evangelizers, the lowest tier of the Church's hierarchy. Fortuny states that "the rank of deaconess is not a position which common women could aspire to". The first two deaconesses were the church founder's wife Elisa Flores, and Francisca Cuevas. Wives of important members of the Church usually get the rank of deaconess.

Women are active and play key roles in organizing and administering activities in the Church. Female officeholders are always heads of groups of women, not men. A deaconess can help pastors and deacons but cannot herself administer the sacrament. All members of the ministerial hierarchy are paid for their services as part of the tithe by the congregational members.

At the turn of the century, La Luz del Mundo began promoting women to public relations positions previously held by men only. As of December 2014, two women and three men serve as legal representatives of the church in Northern Mexico. Public relations positions that have been held by women include spokesperson, director of social communication, and assistant director of international affairs. Within church operated civil organizations women also occupy executive positions such as director of La Luz del Mundo Family Services, a violence prevention and intervention center in Milwaukee; Director of Social Work and Psychology within the Ministry of Social Welfare; director of the Samuel Joaquín Flores Foundation; president of Recab de México A.C.; and director of the Association of Students and Professionals in the U.S.

=== Other beliefs and practices ===
La Luz del Mundo teaches moral and civil principles such as community service, the duty to exercise their right to vote, and that science is a gift from God. Church members do not celebrate Holy Week. The most important yearly rituals are the Holy Supper (Santa Cena in Spanish), held yearly on August 14, and the anniversary of Naasón Joaquín's birth is held on May 7 at its international headquarters in Guadalajara.

== Organization ==
=== Ecclesiastical organization ===
The organization of La Luz del Mundo is hierarchical. At the top is Naasón Joaquín who serves as both the spiritual and administrative leader of the Church. Below him in rank are the pastors, who are expected to develop one or more of the qualities as doctor, prophet, and evangelist. All pastors are evangelists and are expected to undertake missionary tasks. As doctors, pastors explain the word of God and as prophets they interpret it.

Below them are the deacons, who administer the sacraments to the congregational members. Below the deacons are the encargados (managers or overseers), who have responsibility for the moral conduct and well-being of certain groups within the congregation. Overseers grant permits to members who wish to leave their congregations for vacations or to take jobs outside of the church district. At the lowest echelon of the hierarchy are the obreros (laborers), who mainly assist their higher-ups with missionary work.

=== Territorial organization ===
A church, or group, that is unable to fully provide for the religious needs of its members is called a mission. Missions are dependent on a congregation which is administered by a minister. A group of several congregations with their missions form a district. The Church in each nation is divided into multiple districts. In Mexico, several districts form together into five jurisdictions that act as legal entities.

== Notable temples ==
La Luz del Mundo uses the architecture of its temples to express its faith through symbolism and to attract potential converts. Among the church's buildings are a replica of a Mayan pyramid in Honduras, a mock Taj Mahal in Chiapas, and a Greco-Roman-inspired temple in Texas. Its flagship temple is located in its headquarters in Hermosa Provincia. Two smaller replicas of this temple are being built in Anchorage, Alaska, and in Chile to symbolize "the northern- and southernmost reaches of the Church's missionary efforts".

=== Hermosa Provincia Temple ===
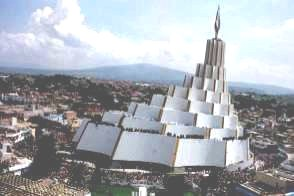
The flagship temple in Guadalajara

The flagship temple in Guadalajara is pyramidal and has an innovative structure. The project began in 1983, when the church's former temple, built to accommodate 8,000 people, was deemed insufficient to accommodate the growing membership who attended various annual celebrations. Construction began on July 3, 1983, when Samuel Joaquín laid the cornerstone, and lasted until August 1, 1992. The temple was completed largely by members of the church. It is a notable architectural feature in Guadalajara in a working-class district on the outskirts of the city.

Dozens of institutions, architects, and engineers were invited to submit proposals for a new temple. The pyramidal design submitted by local architect Leopoldo Fernández Font was selected from the final shortlist of four proposals. Fernández was later awarded an honorary degree for this and other structures. The temple was built to accommodate 12,000 worshipers and is used for annual ceremonies.

The building's design represents the infinite power and existence of God. It consists of seven levels over a base menorah, each of which symbolize steps toward the human spirit's perfection. In February 1991, a laser beacon was installed to commemorate the 449-year anniversary of the founding of Guadalajara. In July 1999, the pinnacle of the temple was replaced by Aaron's rod, a twenty-ton bronze sculpture by artist Jorge de la Peña. The installation of the 23-metre (75 ft) long structure required a special crane.

=== Houston Temple ===
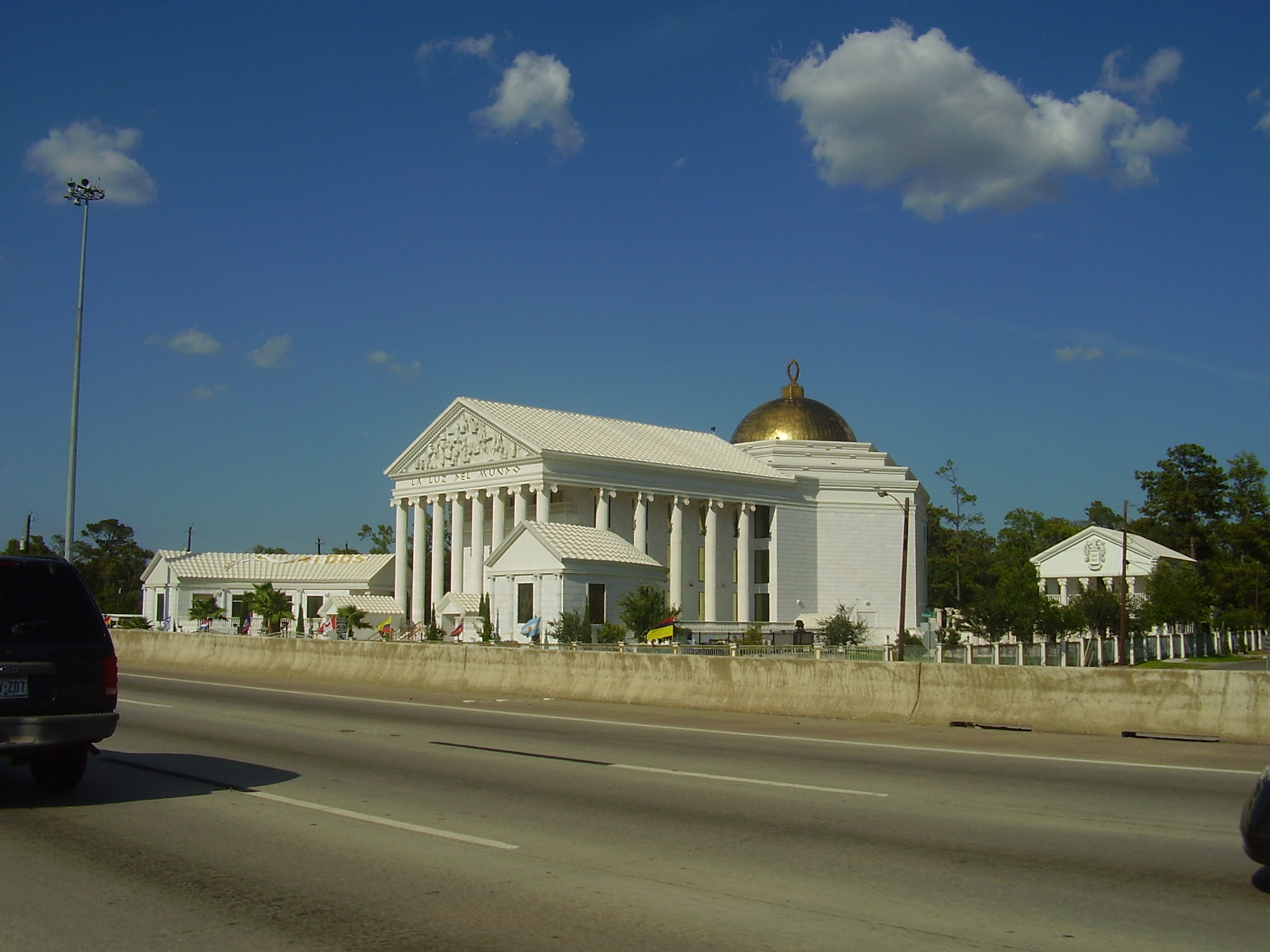
The Houston Texas Temple

The main temple in Houston, Texas, was inspired by Greco-Roman architecture. It is the largest temple constructed by La Luz del Mundo in the United States as of 2011. The temple's pillars resemble the Parthenon. The front of the building is decorated with carved scenes from the Bible and three panes of stained glass also depict biblical scenes. The temple can hold 4,500 people. The interior has marble floors, glass chandeliers, and wood paneling.

The structure is worth US$18 million and consists of the temple, classrooms, offices, and a parsonage. There is a sitting area with fourteen free-standing columns in a circle next to the temple. Each column represents each of the Apostles at the time of construction—including Aarón and Samuel Joaquín. On top of the temple under Aaron's rod—the Church's symbol which represents God's power to bring spiritual life to believers—is a large, golden dome. The symbol is also a reference to the Church's founder.

Construction of the temple began in 2000 and was finished in 2005. Most of the construction was done by church volunteers, who provided funding and a skilled workforce. The structure was designed by church members and the design was revised by architects to ensure compliance with building codes. The decorations and ornaments were also designed and installed by church members. The temple serves as a central congregation for southeastern Texas.

== Membership statistics ==
The number of La Luz del Mundo followers by state in the 2010 Mexican Census. The largest numbers of followers are found in Jalisco followed by Veracruz.

There are no definitive statistics for the total membership of La Luz del Mundo.

The church reported 80 members in 1929, 75 thousand members in 1972, 1.5 million members in 1986, and 4 million members in 1992. In 1998 the church reported having over five million members worldwide, with 1.5 million of those in Mexico, and 30 thousand in Guadalajara. The church has an internal Ministry of Statistics, but researchers have not been able to access membership information.

The decennial Mexican census captures religious affiliation but did not report separate membership numbers for La Luz del Mundo prior to 2000, because when indicating their religion, respondents were limited to selecting from a list of predefined choices that did not include La Luz del Mundo. Following a change that allowed respondents to specify their religion if they were neither Catholic nor nonreligious, the 2000 census captured La Luz del Mundo membership numbers for the first time, reporting a nationwide total of 69,254 members five years or older.

La Luz del Mundo objected to the format of 2000 census, arguing that it discriminated against non-Catholic religious individuals who, unlike Catholic respondents, had to specifically state their religion. In 2010, the census changed the question about religious affiliation again, this time to make it completely open-ended, thus eliminating predefined choices. The 2010 census reported 188,326 members of any age, and the 2020 census reported 190,005 members of any age.

The World Christian Encyclopedia reports 430,000 adherents in Mexico in 2000 and 488,000 in 2010. Based on the number of congregations and the average number of members per congregation, anthropologist Hugo G. Nutini estimated in 2000 that the Church had a total membership of around 1,125,000 adherents worldwide, with more than two-thirds of those in Mexico. In 2008, Fortuny and Williams reported a membership of 7,000,000 adherents worldwide. Anthropologist Ávila Meléndez says that official membership figures are plausible given the great interest it has generated among "religious authorities" and the following it receives in Mexico.

In El Salvador, as of 2009, there are an estimated 70,000 members of La Luz del Mundo, which had 140 congregations with a minister and 160 other congregations with between 13 and 80 members. As of 2008, there were around 60,000 church members in the United States.

== Controversies and criticism ==
La Luz del Mundo has been the subject of several controversies. Church leaders have been accused of creating a cult of personality, sexually abusing members, and have been criticized for amassing wealth, living a lavish lifestyle, and attempting to build entire cities. In 2022, the church director and self-proclaimed "Apostle of God" Naasón Joaquín García pled guilty to three charges related to sexually abusing children. In December 2022, HBO and RAINN released an original documentary series titled Unveiled: Surviving La Luz Del Mundo, which tells the story of child sexual abuse within the church.

=== Veneration of church leaders ===
La Luz del Mundo has been accused of having a cult of personality centered around its leaders and its members have been depicted as worshiping them. Church leaders are regarded as contemporary apostles of Jesus Christ, and their birthdays celebrated as religious festivals. Church members often describe seeing or listening to their leader as a religious experience.

In 1998, Los Angeles Times reporter Mary Beth Sheridan gave a description of how worshipers received Samuel Joaquín: "They are expecting their Moses [...] thousands of worshipers break into chest-heaving sobs. Others furiously wave white handkerchiefs and cry "Glory to Christ!". Samuel Joaquín has arrived". Toward the end of Samuel Joaquín's life, church members were using bibles with his key speeches and epistles appended at the end.

In May 2019, La Luz del Mundo faced scrutiny for using the Palace of Fine Arts in Mexico City to host a concert as tribute to its leader Naasón Joaquín for his 50th birthday.

=== False allegations of mass suicide and media scrutiny ===
A day after the Heaven's Gate mass suicide on March 26, 1997, on TV Azteca's evening newscast Hechos, Jorge Erdely Graham of the anti-cult group Instituto Cristiano de México (Christian Institute of Mexico) claimed that church members could commit mass suicide if so directed by their leader, Samuel Joaquín. The claims, that would focus media attention on church leader Samuel Joaquín who would subsequently be accused of sexually abusing child church members, were characterized by religious scholars Gordon Melton and David Bromley as "fraudulent reports by ideological enemies."

=== Sexual abuse accusations against Samuel Joaquín ===
In May 1997, a group of women claimed on the Mexican network Televisa that they had been sexually abused by Samuel Joaquín approximately twenty years earlier. In a third report in August, shortly after the church's most significant holiday, former member Moisés Padilla Íñiguez also accused Samuel Joaquín of sexually abusing him when he was a teenager. These accusations were amplified by Jorge Erdely's anti-cult group, which demanded that La Luz del Mundo be stripped of its legal recognition as a religious organization. Four people later filed formal complaints with the state prosecutor, but the statute of limitations had passed.

In February 1998, the issue reignited when Padilla reported being kidnapped and stabbed by two gunmen. Padilla received 57 shallow slashes from a dagger which could have resulted in death from blood loss. Padilla blamed Samuel Joaquín for the stabbing and for an earlier attack in which he was allegedly beaten by men who warned him against denouncing the Church leader. Judicial authorities investigating the charges said the alleged victims had not been fully cooperative, whereas former church members expressed skepticism of the Mexican legal system, arguing that it favored the Church.

=== Conviction of Naasón Joaquín for sexual assault of minors ===
On June 4, 2019, current La Luz del Mundo leader Naasón Joaquín García and co-defendant Susana Medina Oaxaca were arrested by Special Agents of the California Bureau of Investigation after their chartered flight from Mexico landed at Los Angeles International Airport. A third co-defendant, Alondra Ocampo, was arrested in Los Angeles County while a fourth co-defendant, Azalea Rangel Meléndez, remains at large. The California Department of Justice alleges that between 2015 and 2018 Naasón Joaquín and three co-defendants committed twenty-six felonies including human trafficking, production of child pornography, and forcible rape of a minor.

Before being denied bail, Naasón Joaquín's bail was set at $50 million due to fears that his followers could raise enough money to free him and that he would then flee the country. According to California Attorney General Xavier Becerra, the bail is the highest ever imposed on anyone in Los Angeles County. La Luz del Mundo has denied the accusations.

On April 7, the California Courts of Appeal dismissed the case against Naasón Joaquín on procedural grounds. The office of the Attorney General refiled the charges against Naasón Joaquín on July 30, 2020.

In October 2020, co-defendant Alondra Ocampo pled guilty to four felony counts involving the sexual abuse of minors. Ocampo alleges that Samuel Joaquín Flores, the previous director of the church and father of Naasón, raped her during a trip to Guadalajara when she was eight years old, and that she suffered years of sexual abuse as a minor. Naasón's former assistant, a complaining witness identified as Jane Doe 4 by prosecutors, alleges that she was raped by Naasón, and that she became a child groomer of a group of girls in Guadalajara.

Originally facing 23 charges, Naasón Joaquín García pled guilty to three charges related to sexually abusing children on June 3, 2022, just before the start of his trial on June 6. Following the guilty plea, the Los Angeles County Superior Court sentenced García to nearly 17 years in prison and required him to register as a sex offender for life. Yet despite García's guilty plea, his followers remained loyal to him, seeing his imprisonment as a test that would strengthen the church.

=== Wealth and lavish lifestyle of the Joaquín family ===
La Luz Del Mundo leader Naasón Joaquín and his family members, including his father and previous leader Samuel Joaquín, have accumulated millions of dollars in luxury homes throughout the United States, including a private 343 acre exotic animal park in Seguin, Texas, called Silver Wolf Ranch, and a luxury home in Palos Verdes Estates. As of 2019, the exotic zoo was valued at $4.1 million, which includes lions, a white tiger, exotic birds, a mansion, and an adjacent museum where a collection of restored vintage cars are stored.

According to a church spokesperson, the ranch is divided into two parts, a federally registered nonprofit zoo and wildlife rescue refuge, and a private zoo-themed family retreat. The church spokesperson further states that the nonprofit part is funded by donations from church members in Texas, while the private part is funded by family earnings from businesses such as a travel agency in Guadalajara. In total, the current director and his siblings are said to own $7.3 million worth in private luxury properties throughout the United States. To date the source of their wealth remains unknown.

More recently, the current director is alleged to have spent $100,000 in a single day at a Beverly Hills store, and regularly travels around the world in a private jet.

== Opposition to expansion ==
In the United States, La Luz del Mundo church has at times faced local opposition to its proposed development and construction projects.

=== Opposition to a development project in Georgia ===
In September 2018, residents of Flowery Branch, Georgia, publicly objected to the church's plan to turn 272 acres into a multi-use development called the "City of the Light of the World". The proposed project would include numerous buildings such as a marketplace, a plaza, a school, a "cultural center", and four hotels. A church spokesperson, Jack Freeman, described the project as the church's "first effort to build cities where the values that distinguish human beings are cultivated, (people) live in an atmosphere of peace, equity, solidarity and above all, on the principles that human beings can achieve the harmony of living together by applying the statutes of healthy coexistence that the Lord Jesus Christ left to his apostles in teaching." Residents also started a Change.org petition and a Facebook group to raise awareness to their concerns.

The church is also planning to build similar projects in El Salvador and Costa Rica.

As of December 2022 the church had not submitted a rezoning application with the Flowery Branch city clerk which would be needed to move forward with the development project.

=== Opposition to new temple in Ontario, California ===
In 1995, La Luz del Mundo acquired a vacant nursery building in a commercial zone in Ontario, California. The Church planned to use it for religious activities and was assured that it could as long as building requirements were met. The city then passed a law requiring all new religious organizations to obtain a conditional use permit to operate a church in the commercial zone. In 1998, La Luz del Mundo petitioned for such a permit, but residents objected to the plans. María de Lourdes Argüelles, professor at Claremont Graduate University and board member of the Instituto Cristiano de México, led the opposition against La Luz del Mundo, which she called a "destructive sect". She said she had seen children and teenagers working overnight on the site under precarious conditions.

Ontario officials met with objecting residents and began researching the Church, checking with cities where La Luz del Mundo had temples, but found no problems. After considering zoning questions and citing traffic, parking and disruption of economic plans for that area, the city denied the permit to the Church. La Luz del Mundo then sued the city for denying it use of its own building for services and for allegedly violating its civil rights. The case was settled out of court in late 2004, with the city agreeing to pay about US$150,000 in cash and fee credits to the Church. The case was not taken to court because city officials and attorneys concluded the city would most likely lose the case and spend more money than the settlement.

The Ontario Planning Commission approved revised plans for the temple on February 26, 2008, noting that the church had addressed neighbors' concerns. The church was issued a building permit on December 22, 2010. The temple was still under construction as of July 2019.

== Religious discrimination ==
According to Fortuny, La Luz del Mundo members, along with members of other Protestant denominations, are treated as "second class citizens". She says the church is called a "sect" in an offensive manner in Mexico. Rodolfo Morán Quiroz, a sociologist, said that the discrimination started by the Catholic Church, which in the past caused La Luz del Mundo to establish its community in Hermosa Provincia, continues in Mexico. Church founder Aarón Joaquín was reportedly beaten by Cristeros and jailed by the government for preaching in a public space.

In 1995, as thousands of members of the church traveled to the Holy Supper celebration in Guadalajara, several members of a neighboring community supported by Cardinal Juan Sandoval Íñiguez protested the use of schools to provide temporary shelters for church pilgrims. Protesters said that after the ceremony the schools were left in disarray; however church authorities presented photographic evidence to newspapers to contradict these claims.

According to Church spokesperson Armando Maya Castro, many students who are members of La Luz del Mundo have been discriminated against and punished for refusing to partake in celebrations and customs concerning the Day of the Dead at school. In one case reported by a Mexican newspaper, La Gaceta, a female church member riding a bus was pushed by another passenger, who then crossed herself because the member was wearing a long skirt. On July 25, 2008, a public official sealed the entrance to a temple in Puerto Vallarta, trapping the congregation inside, until other officials removed the seals. This incident occurred because of complaints from individuals who did not like the presence of the Church in the area. Reporter Rodolfo Chávez Calderón stated that La Luz del Mundo was in compliance with local laws.

Many female church members have faced discrimination and verbal abuse on buses, in schools, and in hospitals. Church members who were patients in a Mexican hospital were denied access to their ministers in 2011. The hospital required permission from Catholic clergy so that La Luz del Mundo ministers could visit patients.

La Luz del Mundo ministers reported that the site of a newly constructed temple in Silao was subject to harassment, vandalism, and physical threats because of religious intolerance, which caused them to request increased police protection. In February 2012, seventy church ministers from different countries appeared before Mexican authorities in Guadalajara to denounce the lack of police protection for the church's residents in the city after a series of attacks left several members hospitalized.

== See also ==
- Religion in Mexico

== Notes ==
=== References ===
- Ávila Meléndez, Luis Arturo (2008). "Entre las cosas de Dios y las preocupaciones terrenales: el camino contradictorio hacia la santidad en la "Iglesia de la Luz del Mundo"" (PDF). In Zalpa, Hans Egil; Offerdal, Genaro (eds.). ¿El reino de Dios es en este mundo? El papel ambiguo de las religiones en la lucha contra la pobreza (in Spanish). Bogotá, Colombia: CLACSO-Siglo del Hombre. ISBN 978-958-665-126-4.
- Biglieri, Paula (2000). "Ciudadanos de La Luz. Una mirada sobre el auge de la Iglesia La Luz del Mundo". Estudios Sociológicos (in Spanish). XVIII (2). El Colegio de México: 403–428. ISSN 0185-4186. OCLC 47166994.
- Bromley, David G.; Melton, J. Gordon (2002). Cults, religion, and violence. Cambridge University Press. ISBN 978-0-521-66898-9.
- Cobián R, Felipe (11 December 2005). "Responde La Luz del Mundo". Proceso (in Spanish).
- De la Torre, Renee (2000). Los hijos de la luz: discurso, identidad y poder en La Luz del Mundo (in Spanish). ITESO. ISBN 968-5087-15-6.
- Dormady, Jason H. (2011). Primitive Revolution: Restorationist Religion and the Idea of the Mexican Revolution 1940--1964. Albuquerque: University of New Mexico Press. ISBN 978-0-8263-4951-4.
- Fortuny, Patricia (2001). "Religión y figura femenina : entre la norma y la práctica" (PDF). Revista de Estudios de Género. La ventana (in Spanish). 2 (14). Universidad de Guadalajara. Archived from the original (PDF) on 28 July 2013.
- Fortuny, Patricia (2002). "Chapter 2: The Santa Cena of the Luz del Mundo Church: A Case of Contemporary Transnationalism". In Ebaugh, Helen Rose; Saltzman Chafetz, Janet (eds.). Religion Across Borders: Transnational Immigrant Networks. Rowman Altamira. p. 24. ISBN 978-0-7591-0226-2.
- Fortuny, Patrica (1995). "Origins, Development and Perspectives of La Luz del Mundo Church". Religion. 25 (2): 147–162. doi:10.1006/reli.1995.0014.
- Fortuny, Patricia (1996). "La Luz del Mundo: una oferta múltiple de salvación". Estudios Jalisciences (in Spanish). 24. El Colegio de Jalisco. OCLC 25067830.
- Fortuny, Patricia; Williams, Philip J. (2008). "Iglesias y espacios públicos : Lugares de identidad de mexicanos en Metro Atlanta". Trayectorias (in Spanish). 10 (26). Universidad Autónoma de Nuevo León: 7–19. ISSN 2007-1205. OCLC 44417986. Archived from the original on 28 July 2013.
- Garma Navarro, Carlos (2004). "The Legal Situation of Religious Minorities in Mexico: The Current situation, Problems, and Conflicts". In James T. Richardson (ed.). Regulating Religion: Case Studies from Around the Globe. New York: Kluwer Academic/Plenum Publishers. ISBN 978-0-306-47886-4.
- González, Ondina E.; González, Justo L. (2008). Christianity in Latin America: A History. Cambridge University Press. ISBN 978-0-521-86329-2.
- Greenway, Roger S. (1973). "The 'Luz Del Mundo' Movement in Mexico". Missiology: An International Review. 1 (2): 113–124. doi:10.1177/009182967300100211. S2CID 180312077.
- Gill, Kenneth D. (1994). Toward a contextualized theology for the Third World : the emergence and development of Jesus' name pentecostalism in Mexico. Studies in the intercultural history of Christianity. Vol. 90. Peter Lang. p. 277. ISBN 978-3-631-47096-1.
- Joaquín Flores, Samuel (28 October 1997). "A la opinion publica". El Norte. Monterrey, Mexico.
- Joaquín, Benjamin (2004). El Elegido de Dios (in Spanish). Guadalajara: Fundación Maestro Samuel Joaquín Flores.
- Marquardt, Marie (2011). "4 Picking Up The Cross". Living "Illegal": The Human Face of Unauthorized Immigration. The New Press. p. 119. ISBN 978-1-59558-651-3.
- Masferrer Kan, Elio (2004). ¿Es del César o es de Dios? Un modelo antropológico del campo religioso (in Spanish). Plaza y Valdés, CEIICH-UNAM. ISBN 978-970-722-316-5.
- Monsiváis, Carlos (2002). "¿Por qué estudiar al protestantismo mexicano?" (PDF). Protestantismo, diversidad y tolerancia (in Spanish). Comisión Nacional de los Derechos Humanos. ISBN 978-970-644-277-2. Archived from the original (PDF) on 2013-10-12.
- Nutini, Hugo G. (2000). "Native Evangelism in Central Mexico". Ethnology. 39 (1). University of Pittsburgh: 39–54. doi:10.2307/3773794. ISSN 0014-1828. JSTOR 3773794. OCLC 1568323.
- Ochoa Bohórquez, Ana Victoria (2011). "Lo religioso como agente transformador de la cultura: Iglesia La Luz del Mundo: surgimiento, expansión, usos y ceremonias México-Colombia 1926–2006" (PDF) (in Spanish). Universidad Nacional de Colombia.
- Wyatt, Timothy (2011). "Iglesia La Luz Del Mundo" (PDF). Houston History. 8 (3). University of Houston: 9. ISSN 2165-6614. OCLC 163568525. Archived from the original (PDF) on 14 June 2013.
