= Samuel Joaquín Flores =

Mexican religious leader (1937–2014)

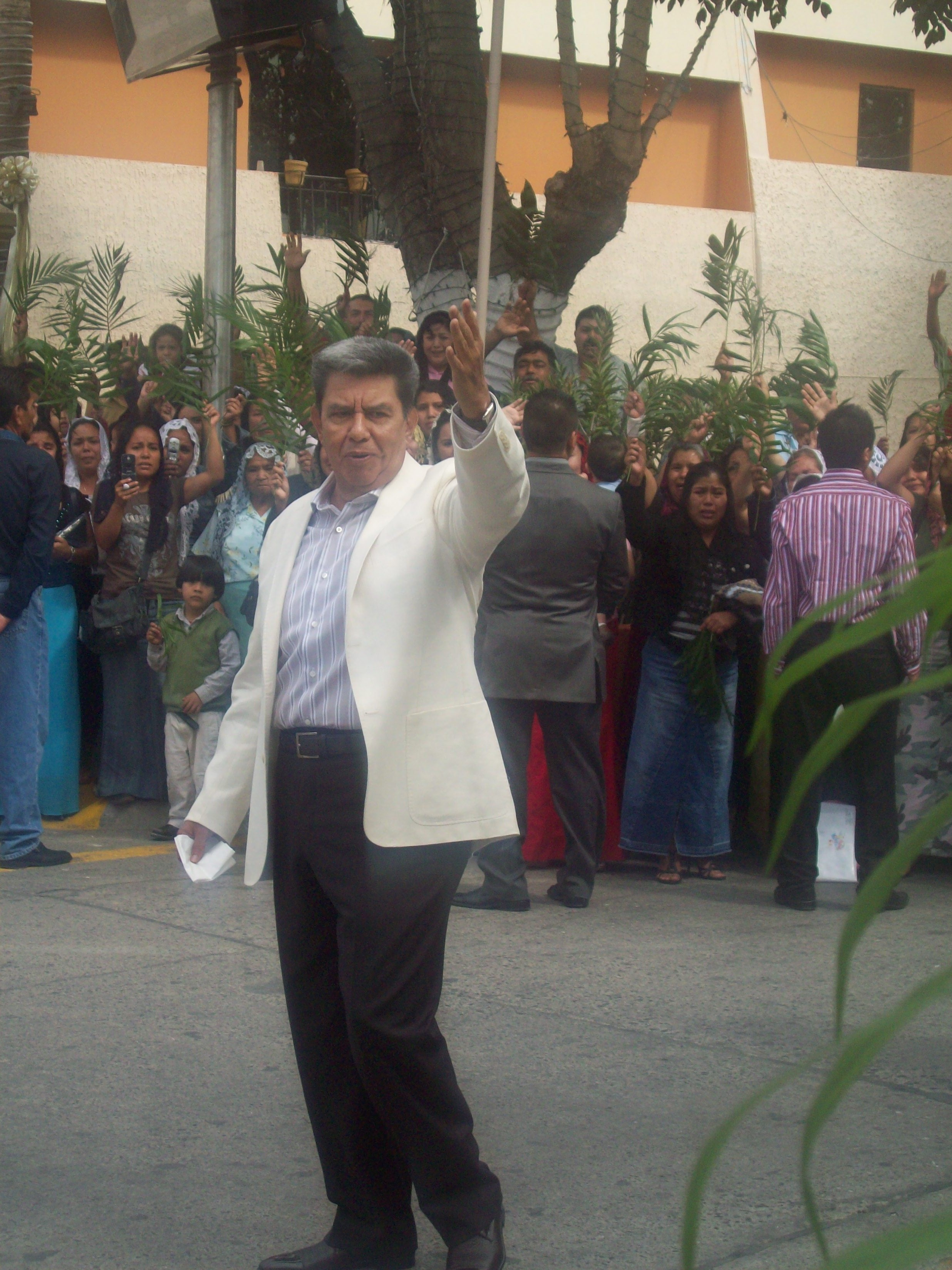

International Director of the La Luz Del Mundo Church
- In office June 9, 1964 – December 8, 2014
- Preceded by: Aaron Joaquin Gonzalez
- Succeeded by: Naason Joaquin Garcia

Personal details
- Born: February 14, 1937 Guadalajara, Jalisco, Mexico
- Died: December 8, 2014 (aged 77) Guadalajara, Jalisco, Mexico
- Spouse: Eva Garcia Lopez
- Children: Benjamin, Israel, Azael, Rahel, Naasón, Betsabé, Uzziel and Atlaí
- Parent(s): Aaron Joaquin Gonzalez; Elisa Flores

Samuel Joaquín Flores (February 14, 1937 – December 8, 2014) was a Mexican religious figure and the second leader of La Luz del Mundo church.

== Biography ==
Samuel Joaquín was born on February 14, 1937, the youngest of eight siblings. He was minister of the church in Tepic, Nayarit until age 27.

On May 17, 1962, Flores, who was at the time in charge of the church in Port of Veracruz, married Eva García López, in Guadalajara. Together they had eight children: Benjamin, Israel, Azael, Rahel, Naasón Merarí, Betsabe, Uzziel and Atlaí.

He became the leader of La Luz del Mundo on June 9, 1964, after the death of his father and served as the church's second apostle until his death on December 8, 2014. He was succeeded by his son Naason.

== Ministry and philanthropy ==
Flores continued his father's desire for international expansion by traveling outside of Mexico extensively.

He first visited church members in the Mexican state of Michoacán in August 1964 before going to Los Angeles on a missionary trip before the end of the year.

Under the leadership of Flores La Luz del Mundo became integrated into Guadalajara and the church replicated the model of Hermosa Provincia in other Mexican cities and abroad.

The original temple in Hermosa Provincia was demolished and replaced by a larger one in 1967. Flores oversaw the construction of schools, hospitals, and other social services, projects, and labor such as the Beautiful Province Educational Institutions where the Hospital Siloe in Guadalajara was established.

During this time the church continued expanding representation in the UK, the Netherlands, Switzerland, Ethiopia and Israel between 1990 and 2010. By 1970, La Luz Del Mundo included Costa Rica, Colombia, and Guatemala in its membership. By 1972, there were approximately 72,000 members of the church, which increased to 1.5 million by 1986 and to 4 million by 1993.

In Mexico alone, La Luz Del Mundo had 188,326 followers according to the INEGI Census in 2010.

Anthropologist Patricia Fortuny says that the church's growth can be attributed to several factors including its social benefits, which "improves the living conditions of believers."

By the end of Flores' ministry La Luz del Mundo was present in fifty countries.

== Death ==
Samuel Joaquín Flores was diagnosed with terminal cancer in the early 2010s. After years of surgery and treatment, he died at the age of 77 on December 8, 2014, at his home in the Hermosa Provincia neighborhood in Guadalajara, Jalisco, Mexico.

His funeral was attended by local and international church members, as well as the Governor of Jalisco, Aristóteles Sandoval, and the municipal president of Guadalajara, Ramiro Hernández.

== Controversies ==
During the 1990s, the Los Angeles Times carried out an investigation in which the case of a 31-year-old woman, a former member of the religious group, who claimed to have been raped when she was a minor by Samuel Joaquín Flores was exposed.

According to the same newspaper, the complainant made her accusation before the authorities along with three other accusers, members of the same religious organization. Moisés Padilla, also a former member of the Light of the World, claimed to have been raped when he was a minor by the leader, accusations that did not proceed legally, citing lack of evidence, and that the organization always denied. Fernando Flores, former secretary general of The National Federation of Settlers in the Province, a church organization affiliated with the National Confederation of Popular Organizations, also declared that it had been raped by Samuel Joaquín Flores, and that he also considered himself "a sexless angel" who had sexual relations with men and women .

The co-accused of her son Naasón, Alondra Ocampo pleaded guilty to four serious crimes related to the sexual abuse of minors on October 13, 2020, within the framework of the trial where Naasón Joaquín finally accepted having committed crimes of sexual abuse of children. Ocampo alleges that Samuel Joaquín Flores raped her during a trip to Guadalajara when she was eight years old, and that she suffered years of sexual abuse as a minor.

In February 2020, a federal lawsuit was filed in the United States against the La Luz del Mundo Church and Samuel Joaquín Flores and his son, the one already convicted of three other counts of sexual abuse of minors, Naasón Joaquín García, which alleges that Samuel and his son sexually abused a Southern California girl regularly from the age of twelve until she turned eighteen.

== Sources ==
- De la Torre, Renee (2000). Los hijos de la luz: discurso, identidad y poder en La Luz del Mundo (in Spanish). ITESO. ISBN 968-5087-15-6.
- Fortuny, Patrica (1995). "Origins, Development and Perspectives of La Luz del Mundo Church". Religion. 25 (2): 147–162. doi:10.1006/reli.1995.0014.
- Fortuny, Patricia (1996). "La Luz del Mundo: una oferta múltiple de salvación". Estudios Jalisciences (in Spanish). 24. El Colegio de Jalisco. OCLC 25067830.
- Joaquín, Benjamin (2004). El Elegido de Dios (in Spanish). Guadalajara: Fundación Maestro Samuel Joaquín Flores.
