= W. Michael Mathes =

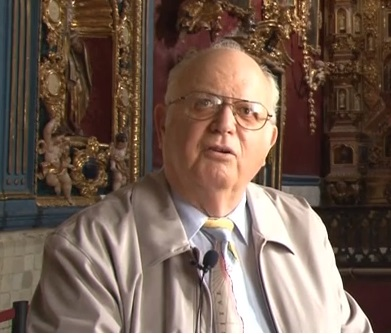
- Born: William Michael Mathes; April 15, 1936; Los Angeles, California, U.S.
- Died: August 13, 2012 (aged 76); Lubbock, Texas, U.S.
- Education: University of New Mexico
- Occupations: Historian, academic

William Michael Mathes (April 15, 1936 – August 13, 2012) was an American historian and academic who focused on the histories of Mexico and Spain. Mathes was a leading expert on the history of Baja California. His articles can be found in the California Historical Society Quarterly, Southern California Quarterly, Journal of San Diego History, Journal of California Anthropology, Pacific Coast Archaeological Society Quarterly, Calafia, Meyibó, and other publications.

== Career ==
Mathes received his BS from Loyola University in Los Angeles, his MA from the University of Southern California, and his PhD from the University of New Mexico,. Beginning in 1966, he was professor of Ibero-American history and then professor emeritus at the University of San Francisco.

From 1974, Mathes served as a researcher at the Universidad Autónoma de Baja California's Instituto de Investigaciones Históricas. He was curator of Mexicana at the Sutro Library in San Francisco after 1979.

Mathes was director of Biblioteca Mathes near Guadalajara, Jalisco. He donated an extensive collection of manuscripts and books to the Colegio de Jalisco in Zapopan, and the collection is now called the Biblioteca Mathes. The Mathes library is a major source of northwest Mexican colonial history, and it was valuated in 12 million dollars. This donation was described as "the largest repatriation of cultural heritage ever made in the history of Mexico".

Mathes spearheaded fundraising efforts for CAREM, a non-profit historical society based in Tecate, Baja California, which promotes the history of Baja California. Mathes's efforts in support of CAREM helped lead to the construction of its museum in Tecate; the organization named the museum's auditorium in honor of Mathes. CAREM supported Mathes' work, including his most recent The Land of Calafia: A Brief History of Baja California.

Mathes is also credited with persuading the Instituto Nacional de Antropología e Historia (INAH), the Mexican government bureau charged with preservation and research, to open a new regional office in Mexicali, so the archaeological and historical collections and investigations would be managed locally, rather than from an existing INAH office in Sonora.

In 2012, Mathes was working jointly with INAH, CAREM, and the Ministry of Tourism of Baja California to seek UNESCO World Heritage status for the El Camino Real de las Californias, a Spanish mission trail spanning the states of Baja California Sur, Baja California, and California.

Mathes died in Lubbock, Texas, on August 13, 2012, at the age of 76. His death was reported in the Tijuana-based Frontera newspaper by historian Mario Ortiz Villacorta. At the time of his death, Mathes was scheduled to deliver a presentation called "From Sinaloa and Sonora: the Families of the First Soldiers in Alta California" at the sixth meeting of the Early San Diego Regional History Conference on October 27, 2012. He was survived by a daughter, Ann M. Mathes (Annie), who resided in California and was pursuing her AS degree in Veterinary Technology.

== A partial listing of works authored by Mathes ==
- Californiana I: documentos para la historia de la demarcación comercial de California, 1583-1632 (1965)
- Vizcaíno and Spanish Expansion in the Pacific Ocean, 1580-1630 (1968)
- Californiana II: documentos para la historia de la explotación comercial de California, 1611-1679 (1970)
- Cortés en California 1535 : el viaje de Fernando Cortés según los cronistas y manuscritos (1973)
- Sebastián Vizcaíno y la expansión española en el Océano Pacifico, 1580-1630 (1973)
- Californiana III: documentos para la historia de la transformación colonizadora de California, 1679-1686 (1974)
- A Brief History of the Land of Calafia: The Californias, 1533-1795 (1974)
- Piratas en la costa de Nueva Galicia en el siglo XVII (1976)
- Las misiones de Baja California, 1683-1849 = una reseña histórico- fotográfica = The mission of Baja California, 1683-1849 : an historical- photographic survey (1977)
- Obras californianas del padre Miguel Venegas, S.J. Supplement : Historical-Biographical Introduction (1979)
- Importancia de Cabo San Lucas (1980)
- Santa Cruz de Tlatelolco: la primera biblioteca académica de las Américas (1982)
- Mexico on Stone: Lithography in Mexico, 1826-1900 (1984)
- Un centro cultural novogalaico : la biblioteca del Convento de San Francisco de Guadalajara en 1610 (1986)
- Californiana IV: aportación a la historiografía de California en el siglo XVIII (1987)
- Baja California: textos de su historia (1988)
- La frontera ruso-mexicana : documentos mexicanos para la historia del establecimiento ruso en California, 1808-1842 (1990)
- Ethnology of the Baja California Indians (1992)
- Cronistas y crónicas jesuitas del noroeste de Nueva España (1998)
- The Land of Calafia : A Brief History of Peninsular California, (1533-1848) (2000)
- La ilustración en Mexico colonial: el grabado en madera y cobre en Nueva España, 1539-1821 = Illustration in Colonial Mexico (2001)
- Bibliotheca novohispana guadalupana : clave a la bibliografía impresa guadalupana novohispana, 1621-1823 = Bibliotheca novohispana guadalupana : a key to printed bibliography of our lady of Guadalupe in New Spain 1621-1823 (2003)
- Misiones en el camino real misionero del estado de Baja California = Missions on the Royal Mission Highway in the State of Baja California (2005)
- Historia de Baja California (2006)
- La tierra de Calafia: una historia breve de las Californias (1533-1848) (2009)
- The Final Days of Father Miguel Hidalgo y Costilla, Initiator of Mexican Independence, 1811 : Testimony and Recollections of Mechor Guasp, his jailer por Melchor Guasp (2010)
- Traslado del menologio de varones illustres de la Compañía de Jesús : cuyos elogios aprobados por nuestros PP. generales se leen los dias, que corresponden en la Casa Professa de Roma : sacanse estos traslados fielmente traducidos à nuestro idioma para mayor conveniencia de nuestros collegios en su domestico uso y para mayor utilidad, exemplo è imitacion en los nuestros y para privada memoria y veneracion de nuestros mayores (year?)

== Awards ==
In 1985, the Mexican government awarded Mathes the Order of the Aztec Eagle, the highest decoration bestowed on foreign citizens.

In 2000 he was honored with the Sir Thomas More Medal for Book Collecting, "Private Collecting for the Public Good," by the University of San Francisco Gleeson Library and the Gleeson Library Associates.

The government of Spain also awarded Mathes the Order of Isabella the Catholic in November 2005. He received award at the "International Colloquium of El Camino Real -- Mexico Norte y Texas" conference at the University of Texas campus in San Antonio, Texas.

The Universidad Autónoma de Baja California awarded him the honorary degree of Doctor Honoris Causa.
