= Naasón Joaquín García =

Mexican religious leader and convicted child sex offender

International Director of the La Luz del Mundo Church
- Incumbent
- Assumed office 14 December 2014
- Preceded by: Samuel Joaquín Flores

Personal details
- Born: 7 May 1969 (age 57) Guadalajara, Jalisco, Mexico
- Spouse: Alma Zamora
- Parent(s): Samuel Joaquín Flores; Eva García López
- Criminal information
- Convictions: Oral copulation with a minor (2 counts); Lewd acts on a child (1 count)
- Criminal charges: State charges: Lewd act upon a child; Conspiracy to human traffic by procuring a child to engage in lewd acts; Forcible rape of a minor; Unlawful sexual intercourse; Forcible oral copulation ×4; Oral copulation of a person under 18 ×2; Forcible oral copulation of a person under 18; Human trafficking for production of child pornography; Forcible rape ×5; Extortion ×4; Possession of child pornography; Federal charges: Racketeering conspiracy; Sex trafficking conspiracy; Sex trafficking by force, fraud, and coercion; Inducement to travel to engage in unlawful sexual activity; Conspiracy to sexually exploit children; Child exploitation enterprise
- Penalty: 16 years, 8 months

Naasón Merarí Joaquín García (born 7 May 1969) is a Mexican convicted child sex offender and religious leader who serves from prison as the third leader of the La Luz del Mundo church, succeeding his father, Samuel Joaquín Flores following his death in 2014. In June 2022, he pled guilty in California to three charges related to sexually abusing children, and was sentenced to 16 years and 8 months.

== Early life ==
Joaquín García was born on 7 May 1969 in the Mexican city of Guadalajara, Jalisco. He was the fifth of seven children to Samuel Joaquín Flores and Eva García.

== Career ==
Before succeeding his father as head of La Luz del Mundo at 45, he was a minister for the group in Santa Ana, California. He had previously served as minister for other congregations in cities throughout California (Huntington Park, San Diego, East Los Angeles, Santa Maria) and Arizona.

== Arrest and legal proceedings ==
On 3 June 2019, Joaquín García was arrested and charged by prosecutors from Los Angeles County with sexual abuse charges involving minors. Susana Medina Oaxaca and Alondra Ocampo were also charged. Joaquín García was held on $50 million bail, Ocampo on $25 million, and Oaxaca remained free on bail. A fourth defendant, Azalea Rangel Melendez, who was previously charged with rape, remained at large. A federal lawsuit against the church and Joaquín García alleging that he and his father regularly sexually abused a Southern California girl from the time she was twelve until she was eighteen was still pending as of July 2020.

Two days before his trial in June 2022, Joaquín Garcia pleaded guilty to three charges related to sexually abusing children. On 8 June 2022, he was convicted and sentenced to 16 years and 8 months in prison.

He was transferred to North Kern State Prison for evaluations to determine his placement within the prison system. He was to also undergo a civil trial on charges including human trafficking and forced labor; a RICO suit named him, the organization called Light of the World, his mother, his wife, his brother, and many of the leaders of the organization. Federal criminal investigations were pending in both the United States and Mexico. As of April 2023, he is held in the California Institution for Men in Chino, California.

In October 2023, Joaquín Garcia was indicted by a federal grand jury on charges relating to the production and possession of child pornography.

== Personal life ==
Joaquín Garcia is married to Alma Zamora. They have three children.
