= Apostolic Assembly of the Faith in Christ Jesus =

Oneness Pentecostal Denomination

Apostolic Assembly Of The Faith In Christ Jesus
- Emblem of the Apostolic Assembly of the Faith in Christ Jesus
- Classification: Nontrinitarian Protestant
- Orientation: Oneness Pentecostalism
- Polity: Episcopal
- Region: United States, Canada, Latin America, Africa, Europe and Asia
- Founder: Francisco F. Llorente, Antonio Castañeda Nava
- Origin: Jimtown, California
- Separated from: Azusa Street Revival/P.A.W.
- Congregations: est. 1,500
- Members: est. 220,000

The Apostolic Assembly of the Faith in Christ Jesus (AAFCJ) is a Oneness Pentecostal denomination in the United States. It was founded in 1925 and incorporated in California on March 15, 1930, and is currently headquartered in Fontana, California.

== History ==
The AAFCJ emerged from the Pentecostal movement that began with the Azusa Street Revival in the city of Los Angeles in 1906. Juan Navarro, a participant of that revival, baptized Francisco Llorente in 1912, who later was elected the first Bishop President of the Apostolic Assembly when it formed in 1925. The organization became a California corporation on March 15, 1930.

== See also ==
- Iglesia Apostólica de la Fe en Cristo Jesús
- Church of Our Lord Jesus Christ of the Apostolic Faith
- Pentecostal Assemblies of the World
