= Orthodox Church in Italy =

Orthodox Church in Italy may refer to:

- Eastern Orthodoxy in Italy
- Oriental Orthodoxy in Italy
- the former name of an Italian vicariate of the Nordic Catholic Church
