= United Church of Christ in Zimbabwe =

The United Church of Christ in Zimbabwe (commonly referred as UCCZ) belongs to the Reformed family of churches and was created by the work of the American Board of Foreign Missions of the United Church of Christ (USA). In 1893 they started work in the eastern part of Zimbabwe. The first mission stations were established in Mount Silinda and Chikore in 1895. The church had satellite congregations in Beacon Hills, Emerald Hill and Mziter. It became independent in 1977, and has experienced significant growth since then. Successful leaders were M. C. Kuchera and Dr F. J. Gomero.

It has about 30,000 members and 50 congregations and 130 house fellowships and has 3 conferences each with a superintendent and a spiritual leader. These conferences are the Western Conference, the Eastern Conference and the northern Conference. The Highest court is the Synod. It is a member of the World Council of Churches. It has sister church relations with the United Church of Christ and the United Church of Canada since 2012.

History of congregations in Bulawayo, The first church in Bulawayo was established in Mpopoma. Three more have been established in City Centre, Luveve and Nketa 6. The services are mainly conducted in ChiNdau as well as in isiNdebele however accommodative to other languages since Bulawayo is a multilingual city.
