= Orthodox Presbyterian Church in Cameroon =

The Eglise Presbyterien Camerounaise Orthodoxe EPCO is a Reformed Francophone Presbyterian denomination in Cameroon. It is a breakaway group from the French Eglise Presbyterien du Cameroon[EPC]. At the 10th General Assembly in January, 1967 the EPC joined the World Council of Churches and because of these decisions pastor Jean Andjongo started Eglise Presbyterienne Initiale. In 1967 the EPC appealed to court denouncing the illegal appropriation of churches, manses, schools by the new church. It turned out that the massage originated from a catechist Bille Ze Etienne. The authorities sentenced more than 100 pastors, but later they were released except for Jean Adjongo and Etienne, they were imprisoned, and sentenced to 2 and 4 years. The court decided in favor of Eglise Presbyterienne Initiale. It was supported by conservative American churches.

In 1970 the denomination was registered by the government. The name was changed to EPCO and the church experienced considerable growth in the following decades.

It has 400,000 members and 163 congregations and 365 house fellowships in 2004. It adheres to the Westminster Confession of Faith and its partner church is the Free Presbyterian Church of Ulster.
