= Colef =

Mexican institute of higher education

El Colegio de la Frontera Norte
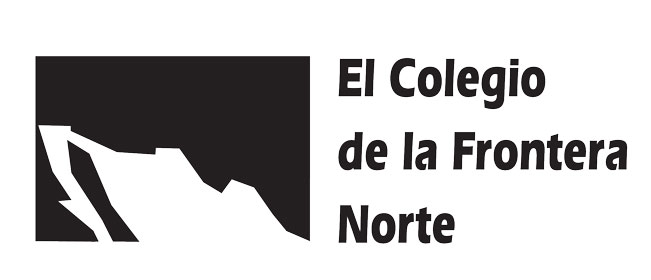
- Other names: El Colef
- Type: Public research university
- Established: 1982
- Parent institution: Conacyt (National Council for Science and Technology)
- Academic affiliations: Conacyt
- Location: Tijuana, Baja California, Mexico
- Website: www.colef.mx

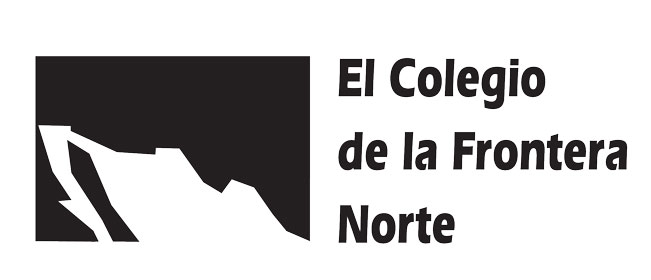

El Colegio de la Frontera Norte (commonly known as El Colef, English: The College of the Northern Border) is a Mexican institute of higher education, specializing in teaching and research in the social sciences with focus on border issues. It is also considered one of Mexico's think tanks.

== Introduction ==
El Colegio de la Frontera Norte (El Colef) is an institution of scientific research and graduate education which is part of the System of Public Centers for Research of the Conacyt (National Council for Science and Technology).

The research originating at El Colef is aimed at generating scientific knowledge about the social, economic, cultural, demographic, political, urban and environmental processes of the border area between Mexico and the United States.

== Objectives ==
- To promote scientific understanding of social, economic, cultural, demographic, political, urban, and environmental processes relating to the Mexico-U.S. border region;
- To transform this knowledge into tools applicable in regional-planning efforts; and
- To identify and define events that could hinder regional progress, the region’s integration into the national development process, and relations between Mexico and the United States.

== Institutional structure ==
El Colef’s research and teaching focuses on seven major themes:

- International Migration (Human migration)
- Industry and Labor Studies
- Regional Development
- Economic Development
- Population
- Cultural Studies
- Environment and Development

== Academic departments ==
El Colef has 107 research professors in six academic departments: Estudios de Administración Pública (Public Administration Studies), Estudios Culturales (Cultural Studies), Estudios Económicos (Economics), Estudios de Población (Population Studies), Estudios Sociales (Social Studies); and Estudios Urbanos y del Medio Ambiente (Urban and Environmental Studies).

== Master’s and doctoral degree programs ==
The graduate programs offered are:

- Master Program in Regional Development
- Master Program in Demography
- Master Program in Applied Economics
- Master program in Integrated Environmental Administration
- Master program in Sociocultural Studies
- Doctoral Program in Social Sciences with a Specialty in Regional Studies

All the graduate programs are registered and recognized by CONACYT and SEP (Secretary of Public Education).

Placement of master's degree recipients

- Education and research 70%
- Government services 19%
- Industry 4%
- Health 1%
- Professional services 2%
- Commerce, banking, and other services 4%

Placement of doctoral degree recipients

- Education and research 90%
- Government services 10%

80 full-time professors are directly involved in the teaching of the graduate courses; 60 of the professors hold doctoral degrees and 50 of them belong to the Sistema Nacional de Investigadores.

== Location ==
El Colegio de la Frontera Norte, A.C. Km. 18.5 carretera escénica Tijuana-Ensenada San Antonio del Mar Tijuana, B. C.

Regional Headquarters: Matamoros, Nuevo Laredo, Monterrey, Ciudad Juárez, and Mexicali Outreach Offices: Nogales and Piedras Negras Liaison Office: Mexico City
