= Iglesia Apostólica de la Fe en Cristo Jesús =

The Iglesia Apostólica de la Fe en Cristo Jesús frequently abbreviated IAFCJ is a Mexican/Hispanic Oneness Pentecostal denomination. Its sister organization in the United States is the Apostolic Assembly of the Faith in Christ Jesus the oldest bilingual Oneness Pentecostal denomination in the United States. The IAFCJ traces its origins to the Azusa Street Revival in Los Angeles, California in the early 1900s. Oneness Pentecostalism crossed the border into Mexico through Romana Carbajal de Valenzuela, a convert who returned to her hometown Villa Aldama, Chihuahua in northern Mexico. The IAFCJ thus began when Romana Carbajal converted twelve family members on November 1, 1914.
