= The Indonesian Christian Church =

The Indonesian Christian Church (Huria Kristen Indonesia, HKI) is a Lutheran denomination in Indonesia, member of the Lutheran World Federation and the World Council of Churches.

The HKI was established in 1927, asserting its autonomy and self-government from the Rhenish Missionary Society, from Germany. After the proclamation of independence of Indonesia in 1946, the church changed its original name Huria Kristen Batak to the current one. The HKI adopted a synodal form of policy, headed by an ephorus.

Since 1970, the HKI has had connections with the Evangelical Lutheran Church in America (ELCA).

== See also ==
- Batak Christian Protestant Church (HKBP)
- Protestantism in Indonesia
