= Sudanese Church of Christ =

Church

The Sudanese Church of Christ is a Reformed denomination in Sudan. The church was founded in 1913, and become autonomous in 1962. Congregations are located in the capital city and in the Nuba Mountains. It has approximately 12,000 members in 60 congregations and in 500 house fellowships.
