= Jorge Erdely Graham =

Jorge Erdely Graham is a Mexican Protestant theologian, religious studies scholar, and author.

He is associate editor of Revista Académica para el Estudio de las Religiones, a member of the American Academy of Religion and former director of Centro de Investigaciones del Instituto Cristiano de Mexico.

He obtained a bachelor's degree in biological sciences from University of Mary Hardin–Baylor and a doctorate in philosophy from Newport University. Later, Erdely Graham completed a fellowship in Theology at the Graduate Theological Foundation.

== Bibliography ==
- Secrecy and the Institutionalization of Sexual Abuse: The Case of La Luz del Mundo in Mexico. (2009)
- La explotación de la fe: pastores que abusan sexual y económicamente. Ediciones B. 2008. ISBN 9789707102682.
- Votos de Castidad: El debate sobre la Sexualidad del Clero Catolico. Editorial Grijalbo/ Random House. 2005. ISBN 9789685958394.
- "Los Legionarios de Cristo en la estrategia geopolitica del Vaticano para America Latina". El Circulo del poder y la espiral del silencio. Random House-Mondadory. 2004. ISBN 9789700517544.
- La pasión según Mel Gibson: separando la ficción de la realidad. Publicaciones para el Estudio Científico de las Religiones. 2004. ISBN 9789709277197.
- La nueva jihad: mitos y realidades sobre el pan-islamismo (PDF). Publicaciones para el Estudio Cientifico de las Religiones. 2003. ISBN 9789709277180.
- Sectas destructivas: un análisis científico. Publicaciones para el Estudio Científico de las Religiones. 2003. ISBN 9789709277166.
- "Ministros de culto y abuso sexual ¿Existen cifras en Mexico?: un acercamiento estadístico". Ciencia Ergo Sum. 10 (1). Universidad Autónoma del Estado de México. 2003. ISSN 1405-0269.
- Pastores que abusan, nueva version revisada y ampliada (PDF). Editorial Unilit. 2002. ISBN 9780789910608.
- Terrorismo religioso: un análisis y una respuesta de una tragedia. Editorial Unilit. 2002. ISBN 9780789910257.
- Cómo identificar una secta. Publicaciones para el Estudio Científico de las Religiones. 2002. ISBN 9789709277159.
- Terrorismo religioso: la guerra del siglo XXI: el ataque al World Trade Center y al Pentágono. Publicaciones para el Estudio Científico de las Religiones. 2001. ISBN 9789709277128.
- Sanidad Interior: El Nuevo Psicoevangelio. MBR Representaciones. 2000. ISBN 9789687737119.
- Suicidios colectivos: rituales del nuevo milenio. Publicaciones para el Estudio Científico de las Religiones. 2000. ISBN 9789687866048.
- "Suicidios colectivos rituales: un análisis interdisciplinario" (PDF). Ciencia Ergo Sum. 7 (1). Universidad Autónoma del Estado de México. 2000. ISSN 1405-0269.
- El avivamiento de la risa: caos teologíco en la iglesia contemporánea. MBR Representaciones. 1996. ISBN 9789687737096.
- El evangelio social. MBR Representaciones. 1996. ISBN 9789687737034.
- Pastores que abusan. MBR Representaciones. 1994. ISBN 9789687737003.
- Cuando el sistema no funciona. Ministerios Bíblicos de Restauración. 1993.
