= El Colegio de Jalisco =

Public research institution in Jalisco, Mexico

Coordinates: 20.7193°N 103.3886°W

- El Colegio de Jalisco, A.C.
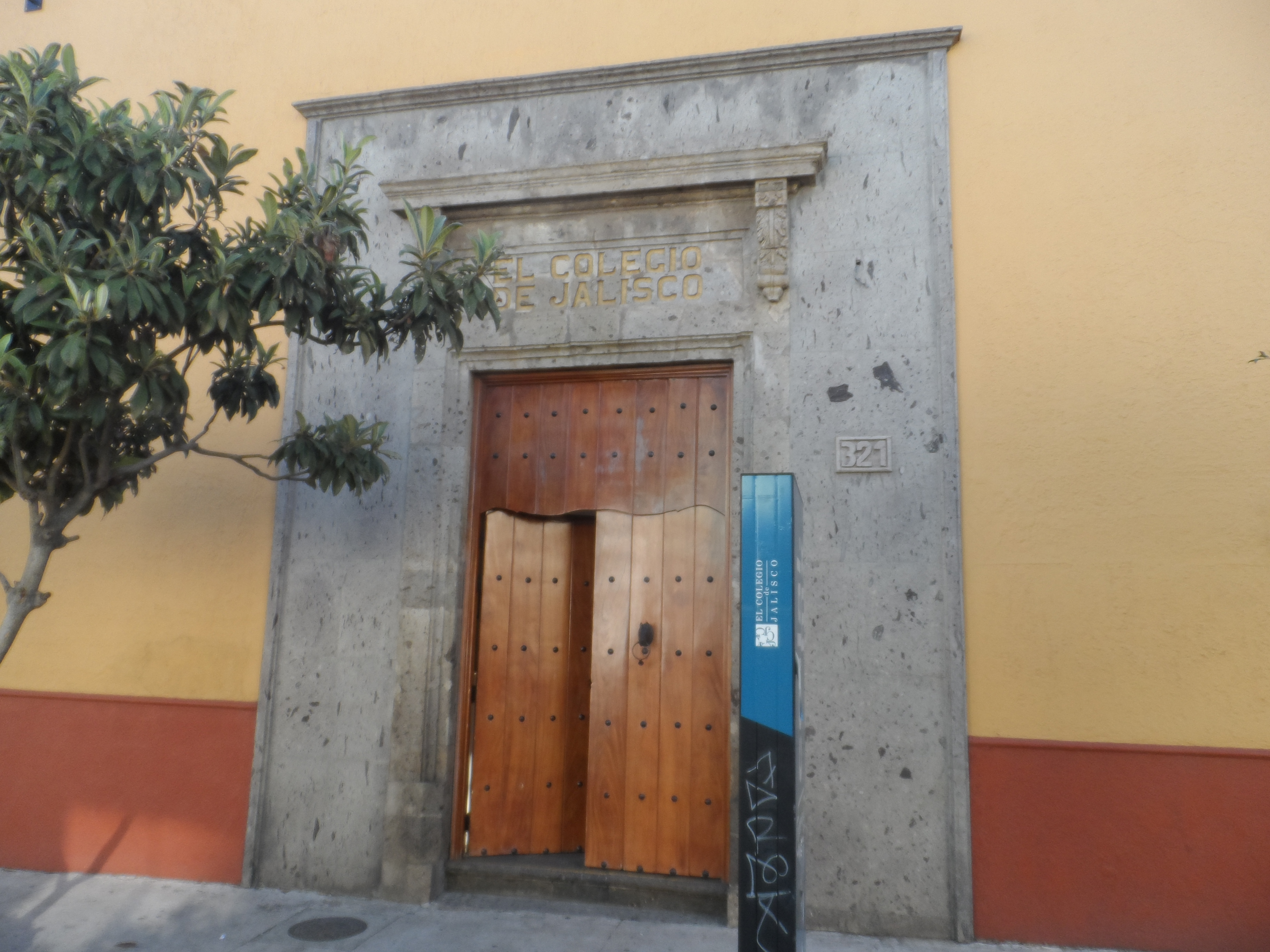
- Other name: ColJal
- Motto: El Colegio de Jalisco es el escalon superior de la cultura
- Motto in English: El Colegio de Jalisco is the highest rung of culture
- Type: Publicly funded research institution
- Established: 9 November 1982; 43 years ago
- President: Juan Enrique Ibarra Pedroza
- Location: 5 de Mayo No. 321, Zona Centro, Zapopan, Jalisco, 45100, Mexico
- Campus: Urban
- Website: www.coljal.mx

El Colegio de Jalisco, A.C. (ColJal; lit. The College of Jalisco) is a publicly funded research and postgraduate teaching institution in Zapopan, Jalisco, Mexico, specializing in the social sciences and humanities. Legally, it is organized as a non-profit civil association, but it functions as a public institution devoted to research, teaching, and the public dissemination of scholarship and culture in western Mexico.

The idea of founding "a college of Jalisco" dates to 1965, when Agustín Yáñez proposed to Silvio Zavala the establishment in Jalisco of an institution modeled on El Colegio de México. The institution was formally constituted on 9 November 1982 by four founding associates: the Government of Jalisco, the University of Guadalajara, El Colegio de México, and El Colegio de Michoacán. It was inaugurated that same day by Governor Flavio Romero de Velasco.

The institution is based in central Zapopan and combines research, teaching, publishing, and public academic outreach through lectures, seminars, colloquia, congresses, and related activities.

== Research ==
El Colegio de Jalisco organizes its research around historical studies, anthropological, social and urban studies, political and governmental studies, and studies in human rights, security and justice.

It also operates its own publishing programme and publishes periodicals such as Estudios Jaliscienses, Intersticios Sociales, and Esfera Publica.

== Teaching ==
El Colegio de Jalisco offers a PhD in Social Sciences and master's degrees in Social and Human Studies, Public Policy, Politics and Government, Human Rights and Sustainability, Archives, Records Management and Memory, and History of Art. It also offers continuing education programmes, diploma courses, seminars, workshops, and short courses.

Since the 1990s, the institution has also offered diploma programmes focused on the history, geography, and culture of Jalisco and the wider region.

== Library ==
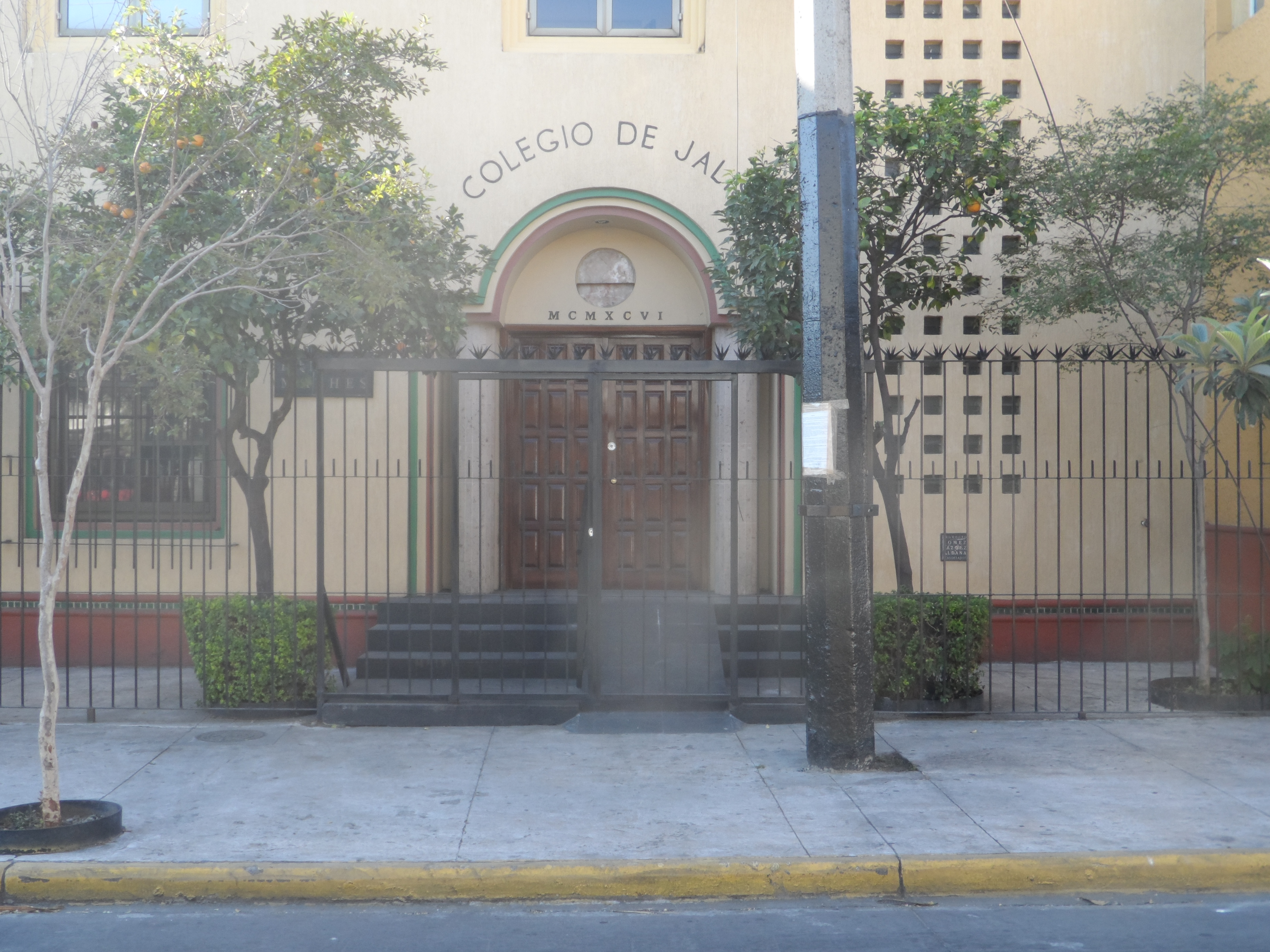
Facade of the Mathes Library.

The Michael W. Mathes Library was created after the historian Michael W. Mathes donated to the institution in 1995 a major bibliographic and documentary collection on the colonial history of northern and western Mexico, comprising 45,000 volumes accumulated over 35 years. The library was inaugurated on 27 May 1997.

According to the institution, the library now exceeds 130,000 volumes in different formats, including reference holdings, general collections, special collections, maps, audiovisual materials, and newspapers and magazines. Its photographic holdings include the Fernando Martinez Reding collection.

== Presidents ==
No.	President	Term
1	Governing Board: Jose Rogelio Alvarez, Antonio Gomez Robledo, Jose Luis Martinez Rodriguez, Arturo Rivas Sainz, Juan Lopez Jimenez, Alfonso de Alba Martin	9 November 1982 – 1 August 1983
2	Alfonso de Alba Martin	1 August 1983 – 11 September 1991
3	Jose Maria Muria i Rouret	11 September 1991 – 24 January 2005
4	Jose Luis Leal Sanabria	24 January 2005 – 29 February 2016
5	Javier Hurtado Gonzalez	1 March 2016 – 28 February 2021
6	Roberto Arias de la Mora	1 March 2021 – 28 February 2026
7	Juan Enrique Ibarra Pedroza	1 March 2026 – present

== See also ==
- El Colegio de México
- El Colegio de la Frontera Norte
