= General Commission on Christian Unity and Interreligious Concerns =

Addresses the interreligious and ecumenical concerns of The United Methodist Church

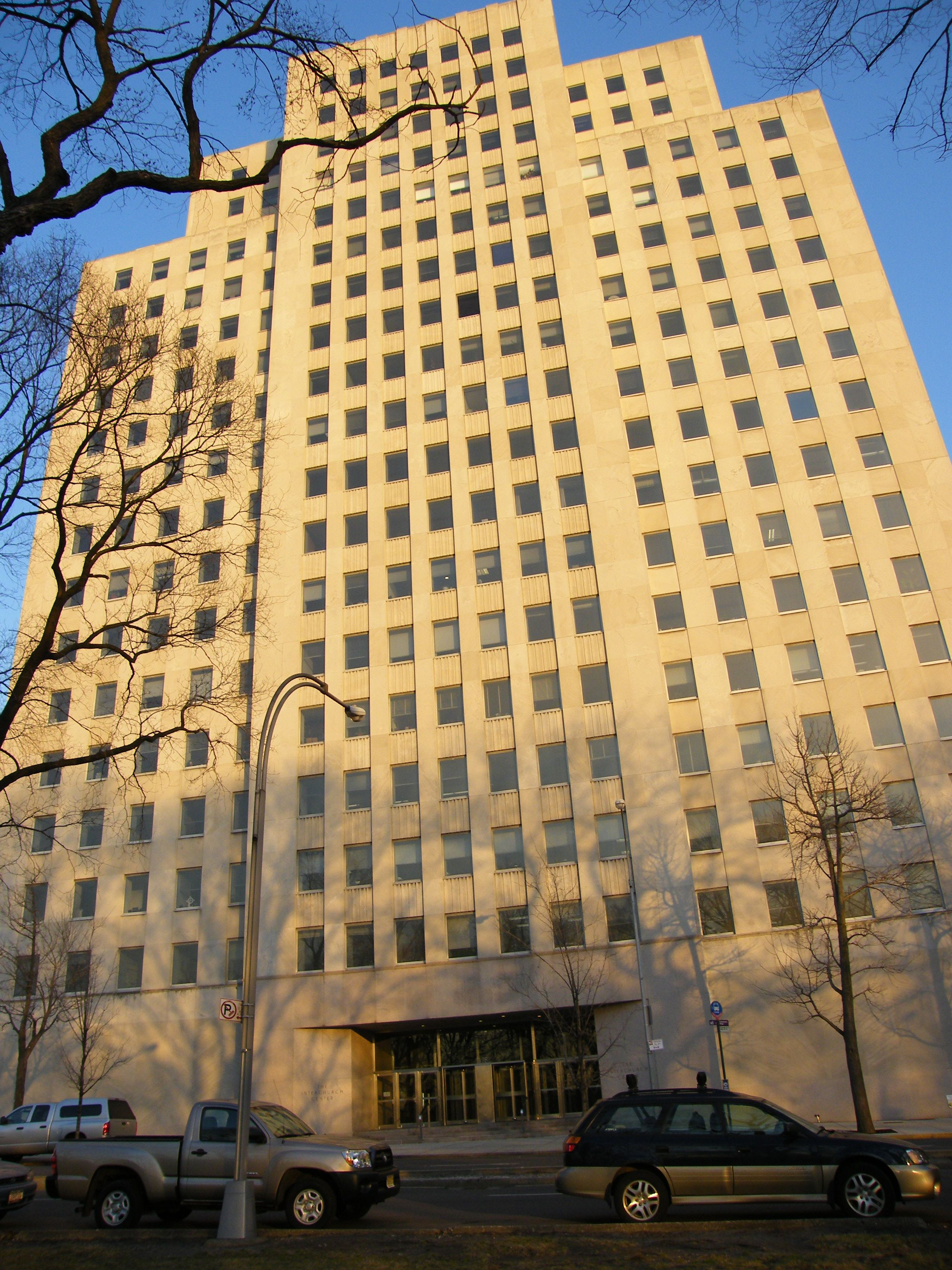
Interchurch Center in New York City

The General Commission on Christian Unity and Interreligious Concerns (GCCUIC) addresses the interreligious and ecumenical concerns of The United Methodist Church. The GCCUIC's office is located at The Interchurch Center in New York City. The Commission's President is Bishop Mary Ann Swenson and the General Secretary is Stephen J. Sidorak Jr. The Ecumenical Officer of the Council of Bishops is Bishop Sharon Zimmerman Rader and serves as the corporate ecumenical officer of The United Methodist Church, working in collaboration with GCCUIC.

This organization is the United Methodist Church's face in the ecumenical community developing relationships with other church bodies and is diligently seeking relationships with other faith bodies such as Muslim, Hindu, Buddhist and Jewish communities to manifest the unity God has already given and for which Christ prayed (John 17:20-21). It also diligently seeks relationships with other faith bodies, heeding the prophets’ and Jesus’ call to live lives of compassion, peace, justice, and stewardship of our natural world.

The GCCUIC’s leadership role in ecumenism extends to facilitating deeper relationships and understandings within the United Methodist connection and with other churches in the Methodist family. For example, the GCCUIC and United Methodist Communications developed a DVD/CD, Can We Talk? Christian Conversations About Homosexuality, that facilitates the building of understanding among United Methodist Church members who may disagree on the controversial issue of homosexuality. The resource does not advocate a position, but teaches methods of holy conferencing around potentially divisive issues and provides material for church groups to explore their positions within theological and biblical parameters. The Commission’s relationships with other Methodist bodies are mainly facilitated through its membership in the World Methodist Council and the Pan-Methodist Commission.

The GCCUIC has engaged in bilateral dialogues to further United Methodist relationships with the Evangelical Lutheran Church in America (ELCA), the Episcopal Church, and the Roman Catholic Church. The UMC and ELCA are now in full communion. An agreement of Interim Eucharistic Sharing has also been reached between the UMC and the Episcopal Church. A statement with a study manual, Make Us One With Christ, has been distributed for joint study in local congregations. Dialogues with the Catholic Church included a visit to Vatican City in April 2006, where Pope Benedict XVI and Cardinal Walter Kasper of the Pontifical Council for the Promoting Christian Unity received an official United Methodist delegation and discussed aspects of dialogue and relationship and the global nature of the two communions. In addition, GCCUIC continues to initiate and pursue dialogues with other faith communities.

The United Methodist Church’s relationships with other church bodies are also strengthened through the GCCUIC’s membership in the National Council of Churches of Christ in the United States of America (NCCCUSA) and the World Council of Churches (WCC). Recently, NCCCUSA initiatives have included a focus on addressing poverty and church development through the Special Commission for the Just Rebuilding of the Gulf Coast. Plus, the eradication of poverty, malaria, and HIV-AIDS has been a focus of the WCC.

Interfaith relations have been addressed by affiliations with the NCCCUSA’s Interfaith Relations Commission, Religions for Peace, as well as several Muslim and Jewish organizations. The Interfaith Relations Commission has developed print and electronic educational and resource materials to be used by local congregations and regional groups for interfaith encounters. The Commission also prints resources for its congregations, including “Basic Facts About Islam”, “Guidelines for Interfaith Dialogue”, a study guide entitled The Holocaust: A Christian Reckoning of the Soul, and Yom HaShoah worship materials.

The GCCUIC is committed to ecumenism, interfaith dialogue, and unity within The United Methodist Church. It is unified through the one body and one Spirit to witness to “one Lord, one faith, one baptism” (Ephesians 4:5). Working to discover how divine grace is evident in other faith communities, the Commission helps discern how to be Christian neighbors and witnesses. As a result, the GCCUIC fully commits to representing The United Methodist Church in fulfilling Christ’s mission.
