= Roswell Parkhurst Barnes =

American theologian and Christian religious leader

Reverend Roswell Parkhurst Barnes (1901 – 1990) was an American theologian and Christian religious leader, advocate and author in the 20th century. He was married to Helen Bosworth.

== Life ==
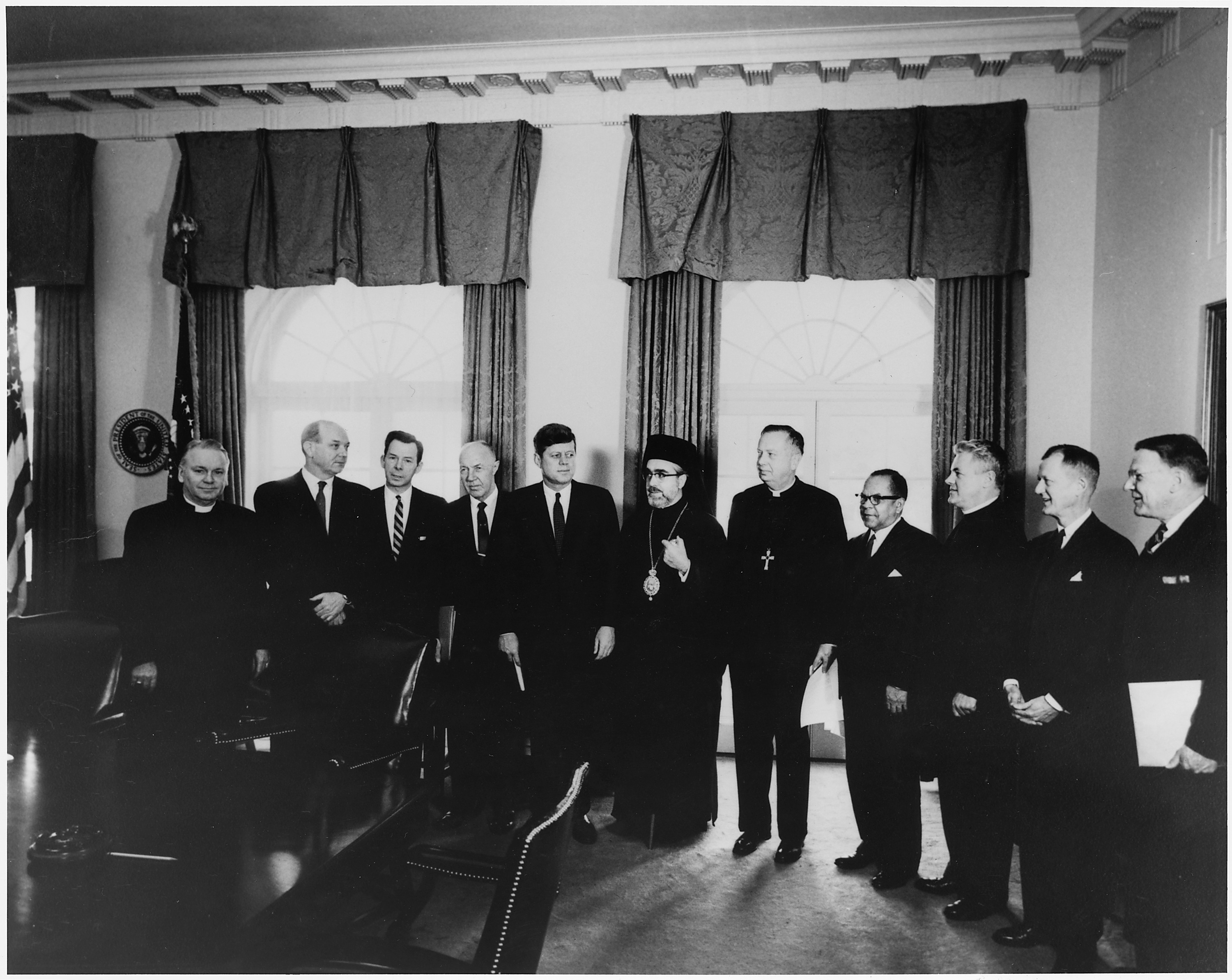
President John F. Kennedy with World Council of Churches Delegation. Bp. G. Brook Mosely, Sec. State Dean Rusk, Dr. Kenneth L. Maxwell, Dr. Frederick Nolde, President Kennedy, Abp. Iakovos, Dr. Franklin Clark Fry, Bp. B. Julian Smith, Bp. John Wesley Lord, Judge James M. Tunnell Jr., Dr. Roswell P. Barnes. White House, Cabinet Room in 1962.

Barnes was born in Council Bluffs, Iowa, on July 10, 1901, into a Calvinist family with generations of Presbyterian ministers. He earned bachelor's and master's degrees in English at Lafayette College, where he was elected to Phi Beta Kappa, and a bachelor's divinity degree at the Union Theological Seminary in Manhattan. He was later awarded honorary doctorates by Lafayette and Cedar Crest College. After attending New York University and Columbia University, Barnes spent several years as an educator. He became an active leader during this time of the Andiron Club. While teaching he completed doctoral work at Union Theological Seminary, preparing to be a Protestant clergyman and a religious leader, which would be his life's work.

By the late 1920s The Rev. Barnes moved away from fashionable Presbyterian pulpits to concern himself with an array of social justice and political issues, in many cases being ahead of his time.

He was active in the 1920s in the Committee on Militarism in Education (CME), established in 1925 by John Nevin Sayre, Norman Thomas, and E. Raymond Wilson to combat the military training then required at public schools and universities; the CME fought to remove military training, in the form of Reserve Officer Training Corps (ROTC), from high schools and to eliminate then compulsory ROTC service at state universities. In 1928 he resigned out of protest to red-baiting of opponents of such training.

The Rev. Roswell P. Barnes served as associate general secretary of both the Federal Council of Churches from 1940 to 1950 and its successor, the National Council of Churches (NCC), from 1954 to 1958, when he was appointed executive secretary of the United States conference of the World Council of Churches (WCC) until 1964. He served with the aid of Charles Phelps Taft II - son of President William Howard Taft - who supported the ecumenical movement and Barnes' belief for a need for a blueprint for the Protestant community to affect the world, and to serve as a counterpoint to Catholicism's increasing popular influence led by Archbishop Fulton Sheen. The WCC had strong support by leaders of the Republican Party. Rev. Barnes was noted for his strong views regarding social justice and economic equality of opportunity, in keeping with a vein of Republicanism during his day, and spent a great deal of energy in social causes, including befriending and aiding Dr. W. E. B. Du Bois. He also served as Executive Secretary of the NCC's Division of Christian Life and Work, a social welfare organization associated with the Union Theological Seminary. For this, he and many of the prominent blue-blood social activists with whom he was closely associated, such as Harry F. Ward, Jerome Davis, William B. Spofford, and Albert Rhys Williams, were accused of being communist spies after testimony was given by the "communist turncoat" (later confirmed also as paid informant) and favorite McCarthyite witness Benjamin David Gitlow.

Rev. Barnes was requested to perform the burial service for John Foster Dulles due to their close personal friendship with him and their activities together with the WCC and despite Barnes' bitter opposition to Dulles' foreign and domestic policies. His appeal as a religious leader and thinker would continue to give him popularity among a wide set of followers.

== Writings ==
In keeping with his ideas on (conservative) Protestantism, and (liberal) social justice and politics, he wrote the influential, "A Christian Imperative: Our Contribution to a New World Order" (1941) and "Under Orders: the Churches and Public Affairs" (1961). As a leader of ecumenism, Dr. Barnes often said it was through work that agreement could be reached rather than expecting accord on the basis of faith. From that he coordinated a multitude of religious-based charitable works and community building. After almost two decades of leadership, his retirement from the WCC came as a result of his increasingly poor health. Said a July 1964 Time Magazine article,

"Barnes belongs — along with such figures as Willem Vissert Hooft, Henry P. Van Dusen, and the late Anglican Bishop of Chichester, Dr. G. K. A. Bell — to the great generation of ecumenical architects".
