= Desperate Preacher's Site =

The Desperate Preacher's Site is one of the first web sites on the World Wide Web to offer Christian educators and ministers a forum for discussion and exchange of resources. Founded by United Methodist Minister, Rev. Frank Schaefer, the site aims to provide exchanges and resources that are ecumenical and international in nature. Schaefer has been its director and developer from 1996 to the present time.

== History ==
The Desperate Preacher's Site was founded as a grassroots commentary and discussion web site for religious ministers in 1996 and was placed under the umbrella of JavaCasa Web Resources in 1998. The web site was hailed as an innovative resource for Christian preachers using new media in a November 2000 article by Ecumenical News International (ENI) which was published among other webzines by Christianity Today, entitled: "Site Hopes to Help Pastors in a Sunday Sermon Crunch."

Another related article from the Tampa Bay Times (formerly St. Petersburg Times) is called "Thou shalt not plagiarize," by Dave Scheiber. It references DesperatePreacher.com ("Desperate Preacher's Site") as well as other similar websites in an article that discusses their use and validity.

Such websites have come under scrutiny since the widely publicized suspensions and resignations of priests and pastors on account of "pulpit plagiarism." The question has been raised whether such web sites are encouraging religious teachers and leaders to use posted or published sermon manuscripts without giving proper accreditation when presented from the pulpit or lectern. An article detailing these issues is called "Pulpit polemic: Recycled sermons are on the mount," by Suzanne Sataline, which was originally published by The Wall Street Journal and then republished by The San Diego Union-Tribune of San Diego, California.
