= Lund Principle =

Principle in ecumenical relations

The Lund Principle is an important principle in ecumenical relations between Christian churches. It affirms that churches should act together in all matters except those in which deep differences of conviction compel them to act separately.

It arises from a question raised by the 1952 Faith and Order Conference of the World Council of Churches held at Lund, Sweden. After "earnestly request[ing] our Churches to consider whether they are doing all they ought to do to manifest the oneness of the people of God", it continued: "Should not our Churches ask themselves whether they are showing sufficient eagerness to enter into conversation with other Churches, and whether they should not act together in all matters except those in which deep differences of conviction compel them to act separately?" This means that, instead of doing ecumenical things, Christians and churches should try to do things ecumenically, in particular, to do things together which are already a part of their normal life, i.e. to share a common life.

Churches Together in England has created resources to help local groupings of churches to reflect on various aspects of sharing a common life.
