= GKI =

GKI may refer to:

- Great Keppel Island, Queensland, Australia
- Indonesian Christian Church (Gereja Kristen Indonesia)
