= Indonesian Christian Church Synod =

Church in Central Jakarta, Indonesia

Synod Gereja Kristen Indonesia
- Abbreviation: GKI
- Classification: Protestant
- Orientation: Reformed
- Theology: Calvinism, Progressive, Ecumenical
- Polity: Presbyteral-Synodal
- Associations: Communion of Churches in Indonesia; Christian Conference of Asia; World Communion of Reformed Churches; World Council of Churches
- Region: Indonesia
- Headquarters: Jakarta, Indonesia
- Origin: August 26, 1988; 37 years ago
- Merger of: Indonesian Christian Church East Java; Indonesian Christian Church West Java; Indonesian Christian Church Central Java
- Congregations: 231 as of 2020
- Members: 263.688 active members (2020)
- Official website: http://www.sinodegki.org/

The Indonesian Christian Church Synod (Indonesian: Gereja Kristen Indonesia) abbreviated as Sinode GKI, is an Indonesian church of Presbyterian denomination. It adheres to Calvinist theology, with head office located in Jakarta.

== History ==
GKI was established in continuity with the Indonesian Christian Church in West Java, Central Java and East Java. These three denominations were originally independent, each arising from separate missionary initiatives conducted by local and foreign missionaries. The first of these denominations to be established, later coming to be known as the Indonesian Christian Church East Java, was incorporated on 22 February 1934. Six years later, and coming to be known as the Indonesian Christian Church West Java, the second denomination was incorporated on 24 March 1940. Finally, on 8 August 1945, the Indonesian Christian Churches Central Java was incorporated. Since 27 March 1962, the three denominations have been united as the Indonesian Christian Church, with the overall governing responsibility maintained by the General Synod (Sinode Am), which aims to co-ordinate united efforts towards common goals.

Both GKI West Java and GKI East Java were originally affiliated with the Dutch Hervormd mission, whereas GKI Central Java was affiliated with the Dutch Gereformeerd mission. Additionally, GKI West Java originally included a number of congregations operating as a distinct presbytery, which was affiliated with local and foreign Chinese Evangelical missions. Despite the differences in liturgy and church government between the various congregations and denominations, all the congregation from the three previous GKIs, without exception, consented to the merger at the time GKI united.

== Organization ==
GKI's organization consists of the congregation, presbytery, regional synod and Synod. Each organisation respectively was led by the congregation council (session), the presbytery council, the regional synod council and the synod council. As the Synod consists of regional synods, regional synod consists of presbyteries, presbytery consists of congregations, so synod council consists of all regional synod councils, regional synod council consists of all presbytery councils and presbytery councils consists of all congregational councils. In short, synod councils consists of all GKI councils which are composed of elders and ministers.

Church government in the congregation was run by an executive congregation council, the presbytery assemblies was run by an executive presbytery council, the regional synod was run by executive regional synod council and the synod was run by executive synod council. This kind of organisation was acknowledged as the presbyterial-Synodal system. What was unique of GKI Presbyterial-Synodal is that, each form of GKI church organisation has its own council as servant-leaders, not a mere executive board.

== Assembly ==
The most authoritative forum to make decision in each form of the church organisation is the assembly. The assembly is respective assembly of council in its own scope. GKI hierarchy is made such that the larger assemblies, i.e. consisting of more little assemblies has more authority. For example, the assembly of the congregational council has to submit to the assembly of presbytery council, the assembly of presbytery council has to submit to the assembly of regional synod council and the assembly of regional synod council has to submit to the assembly of synod council.

== Regional Synods ==
There are three regional synod in GKI: Regional Synod in East Java, Regional Synod in West Java and Regional Synod in Central Java.

== Statistics ==
As of 2020, the church has 263,688 members in 231 congregations, 19 presbyteris and 3 regional synods.

== Presbyteries ==
=== East Java ===
- Presbytery of Banyuwangi
- Presbytery of Bojonegoro
- Presbytery of Madiun

=== West Java ===
- Presbytery of Jakarta Barat
- Presbytery of Jakarta Timur
- Presbytery of Jakarta Utara
- Presbytery of Jakarta Selatan
- Presbytery of Bandung
- Presbytery of Priangan
- Presbytery of Cirebon
- Presbytery of Banten

=== Central Java ===
- Presbytery of Jakarta I
- Presbytery of Jakarta II
- Presbytery of Semarang Barat
- Presbytery of Semarang Timur
- Presbytery of Magelang
- Presbytery of Yogyakarta
- Presbytery of Solo
- Presbytery of Purwokerto

== Church Functions ==
Church functions in GKI are ministers and elders. GKI deliberately chooses fewer church functions. Since Elder (Greek: presbuteros) is a function which GKI believed as being permanent function since the Old Testament to the New Testament. Whereas minister (Greek: episkopos) is an inherited function from the New Testament church. However, there are a few GKI congregations keeping the deacon function in their fidelity to old Calvinism.

== Liturgy ==
GKI Liturgy is adapting and referring to the ecumenical Lima Liturgy and BEM (Baptism, Eucharist and Ministry) Document of the WCC. The Word of God was ministered by adapting The Revised Common Lectionary. GKI affirms two sacraments, i.e., baptism and eucharist.

== Decision Making ==
Decision making in each meeting and assembly is undertaken by means of the conciliation method which is parallel to the consensus method.

== Ecumenical commitment ==
GKI is committed to ecumenism by becoming an active member of the World Council of Churches, World Communion of Reformed Churches, and co-founder of Christian Conference of Asia and Communion of Churches in Indonesia (PGI).

The uniting of GKI has placed GKI as the only church unity in the Indonesian ecumenical family, and one of the eight churches in the Asian and one of the eighteen churches in the global ecumenical family which forms the united and uniting churches. GKI partnering with the Protestant Church in the Netherlands, the Presbyterian Church in the United States of America and the Uniting Church in Australia.

== Theology ==
GKI values its theological heritage which originates from Pietism, Calvinism and Methodism, but prominently classified as mainline Protestant. GKI is doing theology in the context of a church living in the midst of Muslim community. GKI deliberately discontinued its ethnic bond, i.e., (Indonesian Chinese) to be a multi-ethnic national church in 1958. The church affirms the Apostles Creed, Nicene Creed, Athanasian Creed, the Heidelberg Catechism and GKI Confession 2014.
