= Frederick Nolde =

Human rights advocate (1899–1972)

Otto Frederick Nolde (30 June 1899 – 17 June 1972) was a human rights pioneer who served as professor of Christian Education and Dean of the Graduate School at the Lutheran Theological Seminary at Philadelphia while emerging as a major player on the world's diplomatic stage during the 1940s, 1950s and 1960s.

Nolde influenced human rights language in the United Nations Charter and wrote the Universal Declaration on Human Rights's freedom of religion section.

== Biography ==
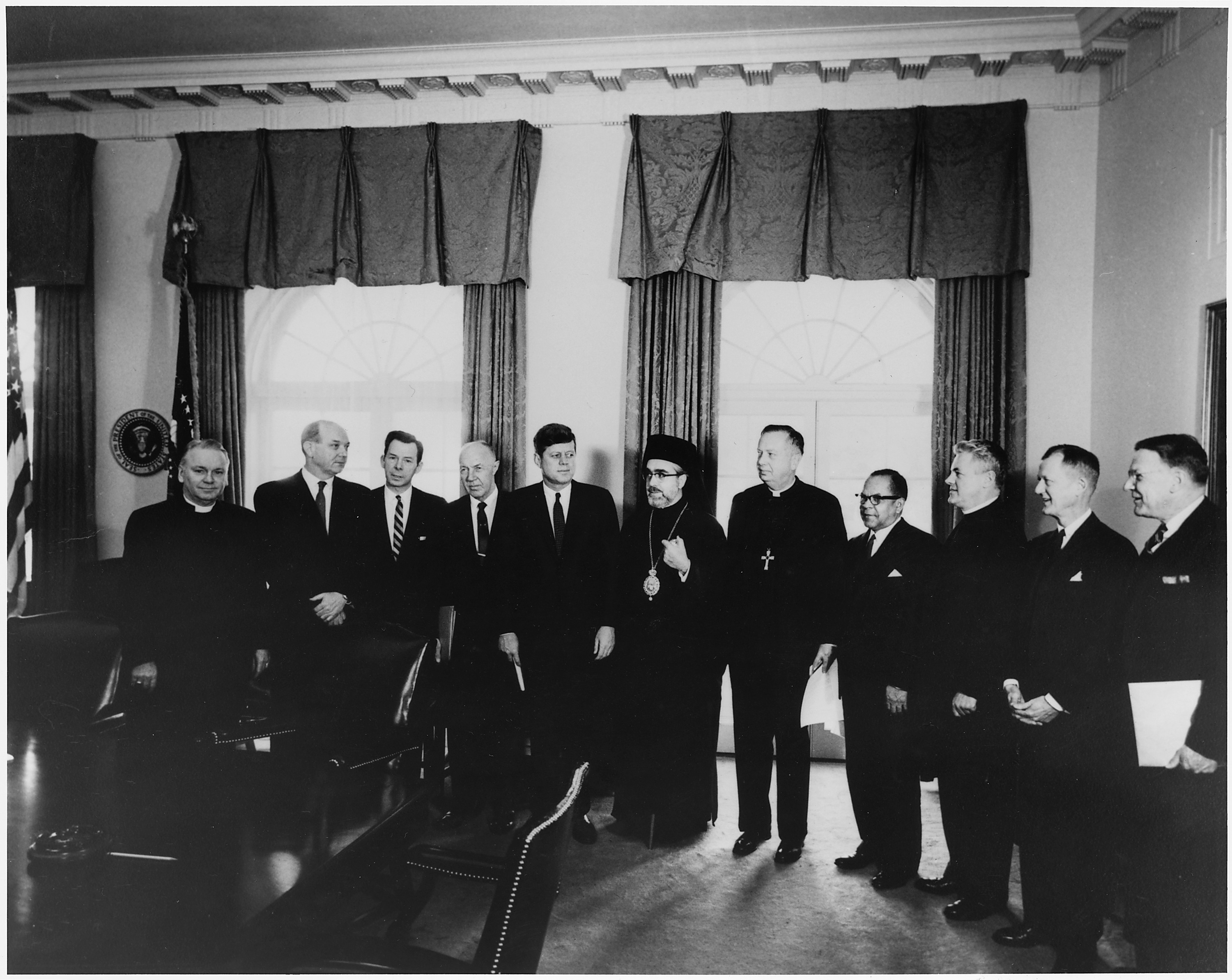
President John F. Kennedy with World Council of Churches Delegation. Bp. G. Brook Mosely, Sec. State Dean Rusk, Dr. Kenneth L. Maxwell, Dr. Frederick Nolde, President Kennedy, Archbishop Iakovos of America, Dr. Franklin Clark Fry, Bp. B. Julian Smith, Bp. John Wesley Lord, Judge James M. Tunnell Jr., Dr. Roswell Parkhurst Barnes. White House, Cabinet Room in 1962.

Nolde lived in Wyndmoor, Pennsylvania a Philadelphia suburb, and died in 1972.

He did his undergraduate work at Muhlenberg College in Allentown, Pennsylvania and was a member of Phi Kappa Tau fraternity. He graduated in 1920 and in 1923 earned a degree from the Lutheran Theological Seminary.

His doctoral dissertation at the University of Pennsylvania was titled "The Department of Christian Education in the Theological Seminary: A Study of the Lutheran Theological Seminary at Philadelphia, Pennsylvania."

== Human Rights Work ==
"During World War II, the Federal Council of Churches of Christ in the United States (FCC) led the effort to shape ideas of global order which culminated in a study that produced "The Six Pillars of Peace." ... After the war, a new unit of the World Council, the Commission of the Churches on International Affairs (CCIA), picked up the baton. Directed by Nolde it pushed for creation of a commission on human rights, for drafting a declaration of human rights, and, within this, for the protection of religious liberty in the broadest possible terms."

He "became the leading ecumenical diplomat, and most well-known nongovernmental organization representative, lobbying for ecumenical goals at the UN" with an "ability to master names and details, persuade diplomats and resistant U.S. State Department officials, proactively write drafts of documents and line up support, and tenaciously advocate nonstop on behalf of the ecumenical agenda." In nearly every case Nolde was successful.
