= Lima Liturgy =

Ecumenical Eucharistic liturgy

The Lima Liturgy is a Christian ecumenical Eucharistic liturgy. It was written for the 1982 Plenary Session of the Faith and Order Commission of the World Council of Churches (WCC) in Lima, Peru and reflects the theological convergences of the meeting's Baptism, Eucharist and Ministry (BEM) document as expressed in liturgy. The liturgy was used again at the closing of a 1982 meeting of the Central Committee of the WCC in Geneva, Switzerland, in 1983 during the Sixth Assembly of the WCC in Vancouver, Canada, in 1991 at the Seventh Assembly of the WCC in Canberra, Australia, and, albeit unofficially, in 1993 at the fifth world conference on Faith and Order in Santiago de Compostela, Spain. Although the Eucharist has not been celebrated at WCC Assemblies after 1991 using the Lima or any other liturgy, the Lima Liturgy has been used in ecumenical events all over the world. For instance, many churches in North America use it on World Communion Sunday.

Another goal of the liturgy is to allow as many Christians as possible to take part in a joint celebration of the Eucharist. Due to church discipline, members of some traditions, such as the Catholic and Eastern Orthodox churches, are not allowed to receive the Eucharist when the Lima Liturgy is celebrated. The liturgy has received both praise and criticism. The Orthodox, in particular, have criticized the liturgy for not being able to resolve the issue of ecclesiology and the Eucharist. For example, one female Oriental Orthodox member of the Central Committee of the WCC was discredited by her church for having taken part in the celebration of the Lima Liturgy as reader and was ultimately forced to resign.

== History ==
The Lima Liturgy was written for the 1982 Plenary Session of the Faith and Order Commission of the World Council of Churches (WCC) in Lima, Peru. The idea was to reflect doctrinal convergences of the WCC's Baptism, Eucharist and Ministry (BEM) document, although it had been first and foremost a document on doctrine, not liturgy. Another ecumenical goal was to allow as many Christians as possible to take part in the celebration. The principal drafter of the liturgy was Max Thurian, who had also played a key role in the group that produced BEM. When he was asked to write the liturgy in October 1981, he had "considerable reservations". Thurian was mindful of the rootedness of liturgy in tradition rather than what the Lima Liturgy was intended to be: an expression of certain theological ideas at hand. Ultimately, Thurian agreed to draft the liturgy, seeking to write it based on traditional liturgical documents that he thought corresponded to the theology of BEM. The Lima Liturgy was not part of the BEM document, and its status was that of an unofficial appendix. Unlike BEM, it was not sent for comments to WCC member churches or approved by the Faith and Order Commission.

The Lima Liturgy was first celebrated in Lima on 15 January 1982. The celebrant was J. Robert Wright of the Episcopal Church of the United States. Present were participants from all Christian traditions and "the widest ecumenical range of concelebrants canonically allowed". Catholic and Orthodox members were, however, not allowed to receive the Eucharist due to church discipline in their traditions. In this initial celebration, the text of the liturgy focused on the themes of the BEM document – baptism, Eucharist, and ministry – and would be modified to better suit the themes of further uses. The Lima Liturgy was used again on 28 July 1982 at the closing of a meeting of the Central Committee of the WCC in the Ecumenical Centre chapel in Geneva, Switzerland, with WCC general secretary Philip Potter as the celebrant. The third time the Lima Liturgy was celebrated was during the Sixth Assembly of the WCC in Vancouver, Canada, in 1983, with Archbishop of Canterbury Robert Runcie as the celebrant. Runcie was assisted by six priests representing diverse traditions: a Lutheran from Denmark, a Reformed Indonesian, a Methodist from Benin, a Baptist from Hungary, a Moravian Church minister from Jamaica, and a minister of the United Church of Canada. Most of the 3,500 participants received communion. Since the Assembly is the highest organizational level of the WCC, the celebration of the Lima Liturgy in Vancouver can be seen as an indication of its significance as a "well-worked and comprehensive liturgy" despite its unofficial status. The celebration was considered by many as the high point of the Assembly, which was dubbed "the worshiping assembly". Janet Crawford and Thomas F. Best describe this breakthrough: "No longer was worship a problem to be addressed by the assembly; it was now a vital and vibrant experience to be celebrated at the assembly." Myra Blyth concludes: "The feeling generated in Vancouver was that worship has more power to unite and reconcile than do documents and negotiations." The liturgy was again celebrated at the Seventh Assembly of the WCC in Canberra, Australia, in 1991. At the fifth world conference on Faith and Order in 1993 in Santiago de Compostela, Spain, the use of the Lima Liturgy in a shortened form during morning services was encouraged, although these were not part of the official conference program.

After its uses in WCC events, the Lima Liturgy gained a reputation as a usable ecumenical liturgy and has become one of the best-known ecumenical worship resources. It has since been modified for and celebrated in many local ecumenical events in almost all parts of the world. For instance, many churches in North America use it on World Communion Sunday. According to Geoffrey Wainwright, "its popular reception is at least an indication of the felt need for an instrument whereby a common faith can be confessed, celebrated, proclaimed, and taught together." In the words of Gordon Lathrop: "the text became a place in which diverse churches could meet each other." Lathrop also credits its success to its high quality. Teresa Berger attributes the success to it being an expression of the convergences of BEM. While the success of BEM allowed for the Lima Liturgy to succeed, the converse is also true: the Lima Liturgy served to further the significance of BEM, particularly its understanding of the Eucharist. According to the WCC: "as one prominent German ecumenist put it, more Christians have learned what they know about BEM through participating in the Lima Liturgy than through reading BEM itself." There have, however, also been criticisms of the Lima Liturgy, from Catholics, the Orthodox and Protestants and, according to Frieder Schulz, "Talk of an 'ecumenical Mass' is premature". The Orthodox, in particular, have criticized the liturgy for not being able to resolve the issue of ecclesiology and the Eucharist. One female Oriental Orthodox member of the Central Committee of the WCC, Mary Thomas, was discredited by her church for having taken part in the celebration of the Lima Liturgy as reader and was ultimately forced to resign. Another point of criticism is that the Eucharist has no longer been celebrated in WCC Assemblies after 1991, either with the Lima Liturgy or WCC's former procedures. Crawford and Best point out the irony in the fact that "although the Lima liturgy has been the subject of critical study and comment by theologians and liturgists, the Faith and Order Commission itself has yet to engage in any sustained reflection on or revision of one of its most widely known products."

Thurian had been a member of the ecumenical Taizé Community. Thus, the Lima Liturgy is sometimes seen as a Taizé-born liturgy. The implications are not only the advancement of ecumenism but also the liturgy as a contribution of the liturgical movement.

Some of its prayers have since been incorporated in the Eucharistic liturgy of the Old Catholic Church.

== Structure ==
Order of Service
#	Part	Notes
I	Liturgy of Entrance	
1	Introit	With antiphon and Gloria Patri. Preferably a psalm, but can also be a hymn.
2	Greeting	
3	Confession	
4	Absolution	
5	Kyrie	A Kyrie litany is used
6	Gloria	With Laudamus Te
II	Liturgy of the Word	
7	Collect	
8	First lesson	From the Old Testament, Acts or Revelation
9	Psalm of meditation	
10	Epistle	
11	Alleluja	
12	Gospel	
13	Homily	
14	Silence	
15	Credo	Niceno-Constantinopolitan Creed of 381
16	Intercession	
III	Liturgy of the Eucharist	
17	Offertory	
18	Dialogue	Dominus vobiscum and sursum corda
19	Preface	
20	Sanctus	
21	Epiclesis I	
22	Institution	Contains the Words of Institution
23	Anamnesis	
24	Epiclesis II	
25	Commemorations	
26	Conclusion	
27	Lord's Prayer	
28	Pax	Prayer for peace followed by the sign of peace
29	Fraction	
30	Agnus Dei	
31	Communion	
32	Postcommunion	
33	Final hymn	
34	Word of mission	
35	Dismissal	The Priestly Blessing with a Trinitarian formula
Sources: Thurian 1982; Kotila 2004, pp. 216, 249, 251

Elements from various Christian traditions are included in the liturgy. Similarly, ministers from diverse traditions are intended to officiate the service.

The Absolution is based on those in the liturgies of Lutheran churches in the United States. It is decidedly declarative (instead of indicative or optative). It is tied to the ministry of the church.

The Kyrie and Gloria have been particularly rich since the Vancouver and Canberra meetings, although in Thurian's original text they are, according to Martien Brinkman, "wanting". The diverse Kyrie and Gloria prayers have since become the hallmark of celebrations during WCC meetings. According to Brinkman, it is for this reason that "the real significance of the Lima liturgy can always be appropriately judged only on the basis of a concrete celebration of the liturgy".

The Offertory draws from the Jewish roots of Christianity by taking the form of a berakhah (thanksgiving prayer) grace said before a meal. The Offertory not only gives thanks for the bread and the wine, as is common across liturgies, but also includes a prayer derived from the liturgical texts of the Didache that prays for the unity of the Christian Church and the coming of the Kingdom. This adds to the themes of creation and thanksgiving commonly found in Offertories a third, eschatological dimension.

The wording of the Anamnesis is based on Protestant theology of the mass and avoids evoking the Catholic understanding of the sacrificial nature of mass. Thus, instead of calling the mass a sacrifice by the congregation, it says "Remember the sacrifice of your Son". The same interpretation can also be found in the wording of the first Epiclesis, which reads: "Behold, Lord, this eucharist which you yourself gave to the Church and graciously receive it, as you accept the offering of your Son whereby we are reinstated in your Covenant. As we partake of Christ's body and blood, fill us with the Holy Spirit that we may be one single body and one single spirit in Christ, a living sacrifice to the praise of your glory." The first Epiclesis is relatively broad and focuses on remembrance of the works of the Holy Spirit in salvation history.

The Pax consists of a prayer for peace followed by the actual sign of peace. This follows the practice of the Catholic mass. The prayer, too, is modified from that in the Roman Missal.

As is common with new liturgies, Fraction is now an independent part of the liturgy. This is not the case, for instance, in Anglican liturgy where it takes place during and in context of the Words of Institution. In the Lima Liturgy, Fraction is accompanied by words modified from the First Epistle to the Corinthians: "The bread which we break is the communion of the Body of Christ, the cup of blessing for which we give thanks is the communion in the Blood of Christ."

In Vancouver, the service began and ended with meditative chants similar to those used by the Taizé Community.

The structure of the liturgy has also been criticized. Lathrop asks:

Can the diverse lay and ordained leadership roles, so important to Christian assembly, be more clearly indicated? Might the penitential rite be better placed before the entrance hymn or psalm rather than in the main body of the liturgy itself? Can the kyrie be used as a clear – and, perhaps, more extensive – litany of entrance? Can the collect function more strongly as the prayer of entrance? Can the text itself give some ecumenical attention to lectionary suggestions? Might hymnody play a more important role? Might there be alternate forms for intercessions with the possibility of free and local prayers included? Is the place of the peace in the communion rite really a good choice for ecumenical assemblies? Could the offertory prayers be eliminated, granted the presence of a strong anaphora and, therefore, the absence of the necessity of any further prayer over the gifts? Can the strongly thematic character of the prayer texts be avoided or reduced, yielding more attention to the always central yet perpetually changing theme of the scriptures of the day in relationship to our salvation in Christ? In general, could there be fewer words?

According to Jacobus Bezuidenhoudt, questions like this are not simply criticism, but "will help any celebrant of the Lima liturgy to adapt it to a particular circumstance. The questions indicate that the Lima liturgy is not stagnant, but that there is a freedom to make changes to the order of the liturgy, provided that these changes are theologically sound and justifiable." Lathrop's solution is to move from the Lima understanding of text as the center of ecumenical liturgy to form (Ordo) as the common nexus.

== Recordings ==
- Kovalevsky, M. (2000). Lima-Liturgie (Ensemble Officium). Christophorus. OCLC 884903807. Catalogue No.: CHR77231.
