= Frank Schaefer (minister) =

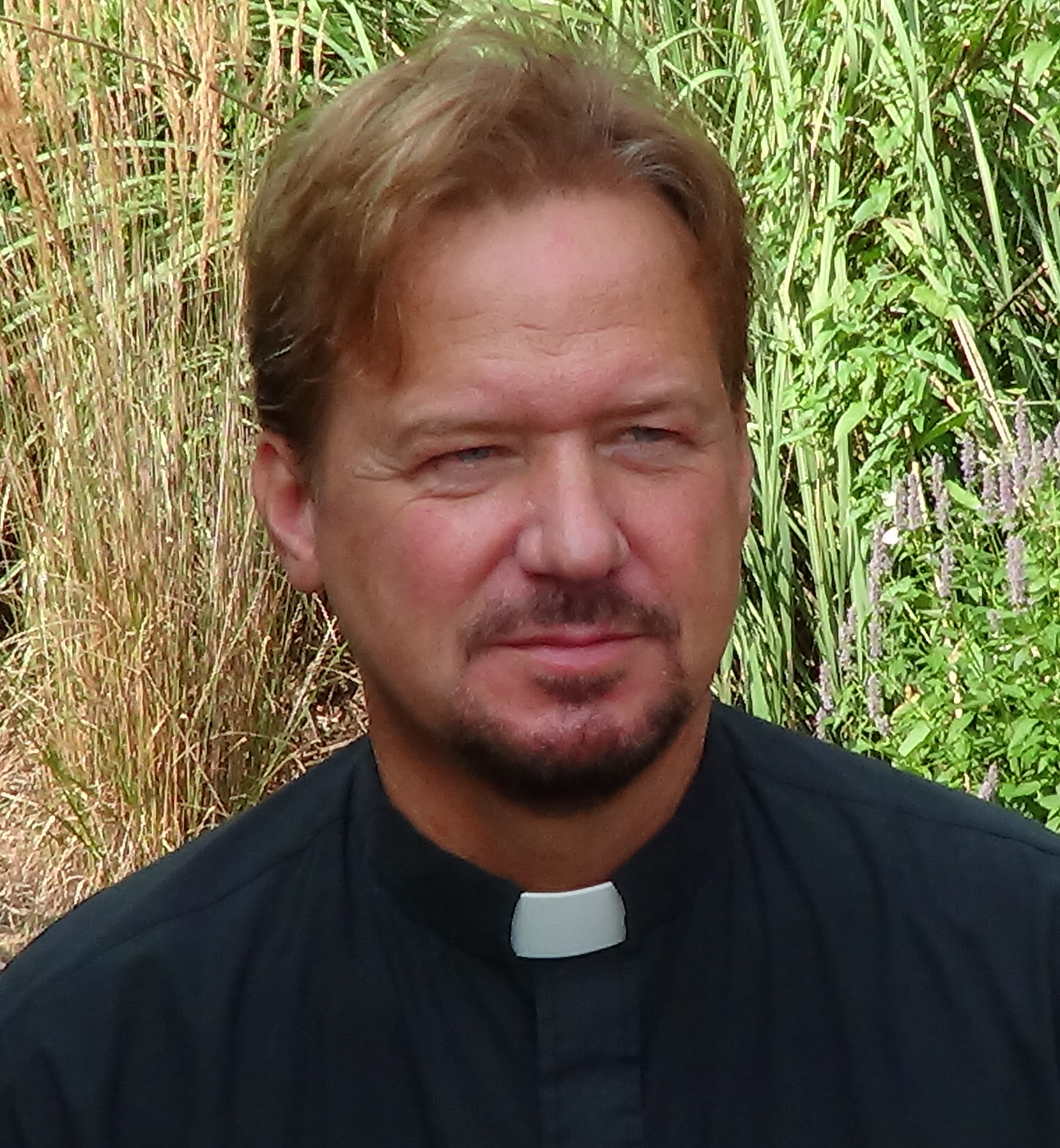
- Born: Franklyn Schaefer; December 7, 1961 (age 64)

Franklyn "Frank" Schaefer (born December 7, 1961) is a German-American author and an LGBTQ advocate. He is an ordained minister in the United Methodist Church.

Schaefer established a popular Internet site for the support of Christian educators and ministers, a forum for the discussion and exchange of resources, called Desperate Preacher's Site, in 1996.

== Temporary defrocking ==
In 2013, he was tried by a United Methodist court for officiating at his son's same-sex marriage. He was defrocked on December 19, 2013, when he refused to uphold the Book of Discipline in its entirety, which would have meant to denounce same-sex marriage rights. He was reinstated by the Northeastern Jurisdictional Committee on Appeals on June 26, 2014. The restoration was upheld by the Judicial Council on October 25, 2014.)

== Speaking engagements and activism ==
While defrocked, Schaefer became a speaker and activist. He continues to advocate for human rights while also working in a new United Methodist parish in Isla Vista, California.

== Publications ==
=== Bibliography ===
- Franklyn Schaefer: Defrocked: How A Father's Act of Love Shook the United Methodist Church, Autobiography, paperback (with Sherri Wood Emmons), Chalice Press, 2014. ISBN 978-0827244993

=== Filmography ===
Schaefer has been interviewed on the TV shows Good Morning America, The View, Hardball with Chris Matthews, Anderson Cooper 360°, The Last Word with Lawrence O'Donnell, and TakePart Live, and for the documentary An Act of Love.

=== Discography ===
- Franklyn Schaefer: Guitar Reflections: Then & Now, audio CD (instrumental, folk) JavaCasa Music, 2013.
- Franklyn Schaefer: Love Like An Ocean, audio CD (Contemporary Christian) JavaCasa Music, 2011.
- Franklyn Schaefer: Keep On Smiling, audio CD (Contemporary Country) JavaCasa Music, 2008.
