= Interchurch Center =

Office building in Manhattan, New York

Coordinates: 40°48′38.87″N 73°57′49.45″W

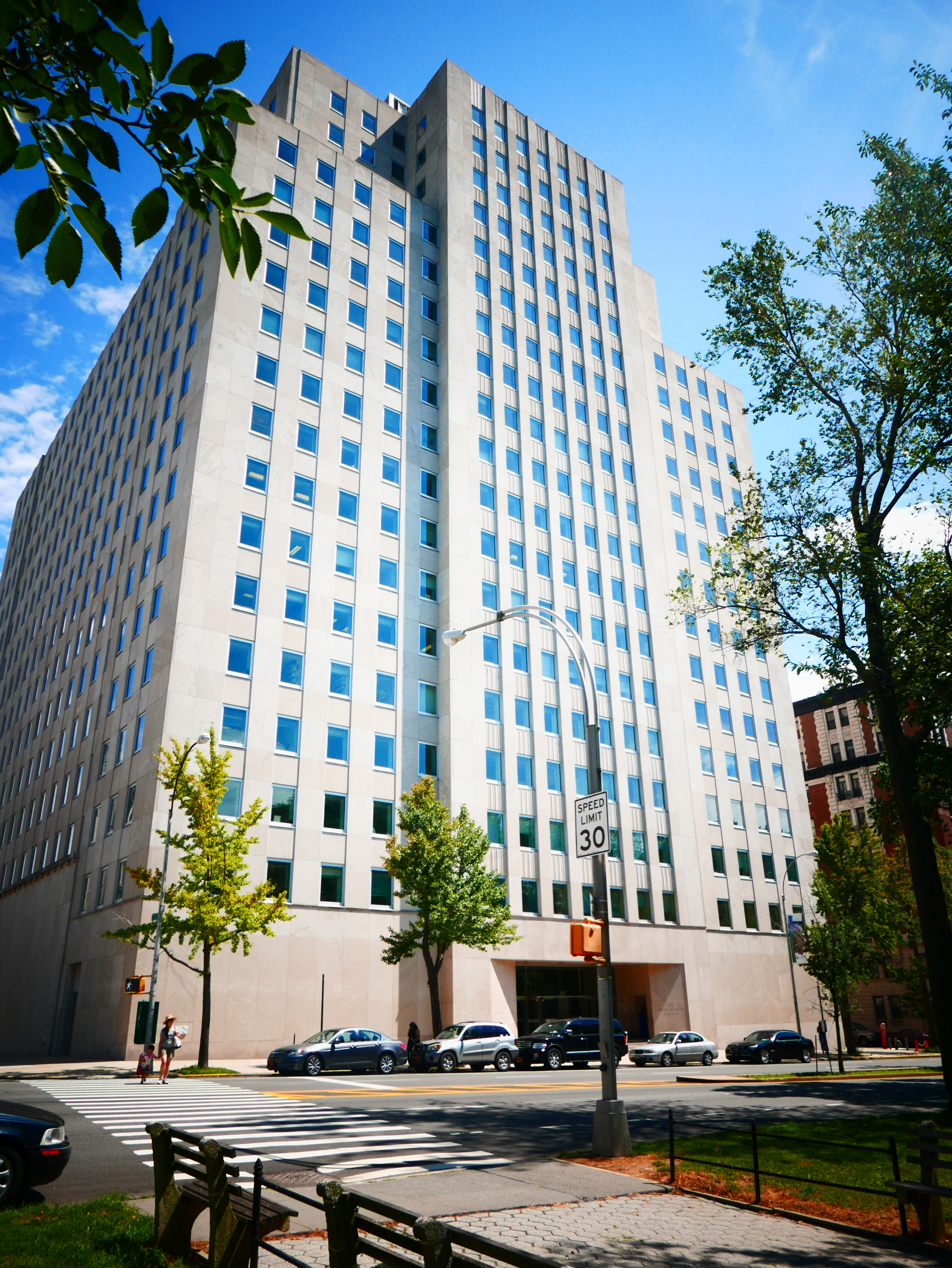
The Interchurch Center

The Interchurch Center is a 19-story limestone-clad office building located at 475 Riverside Drive and West 120th Street in Morningside Heights, Manhattan, New York City. It is the headquarters for the international humanitarian ministry Church World Service, and also houses a wide variety of church agencies and ecumenical and interfaith organizations as well as some nonprofit foundations and faith-related organizations, including the Religion Communicators Council. The National Council of Churches also occupied the building from its inception, but in February 2013, the NCC consolidated its offices on Capitol Hill in Washington, DC, and vacated its New York headquarters facilities. NCC's sister agency, Church World Service, remains a tenant in the building.

Its concentration of religious organizations has led some to nickname the building the God Box. Samuel G. Freedman describes the building as "the closest thing to a Vatican for America’s mainline Protestant denominations." The mainline churches include the Episcopal, Lutheran, Presbyterian, Reformed Church in America, Methodist and United Church of Christ denominations. But across the years many of them moved their headquarters closer to the majority of their constituents, leaving only certain divisions or offices in the New York facilities.

The Center benefits from a strong religious and educational environment. One of its tenants is the New York Theological Seminary. The building is located immediately south of Riverside Church and west of Union Theological Seminary and Columbia University, and is a short walk to Jewish Theological Seminary, Manhattan School of Music, the Korean Methodist Church and Institute, and the Episcopal Cathedral of St. John the Divine. The building is assigned its own ZIP Code, 10115; it was one of 41 buildings in Manhattan that had their own ZIP Codes as of 2019 and the only such building in Upper Manhattan.

== History ==
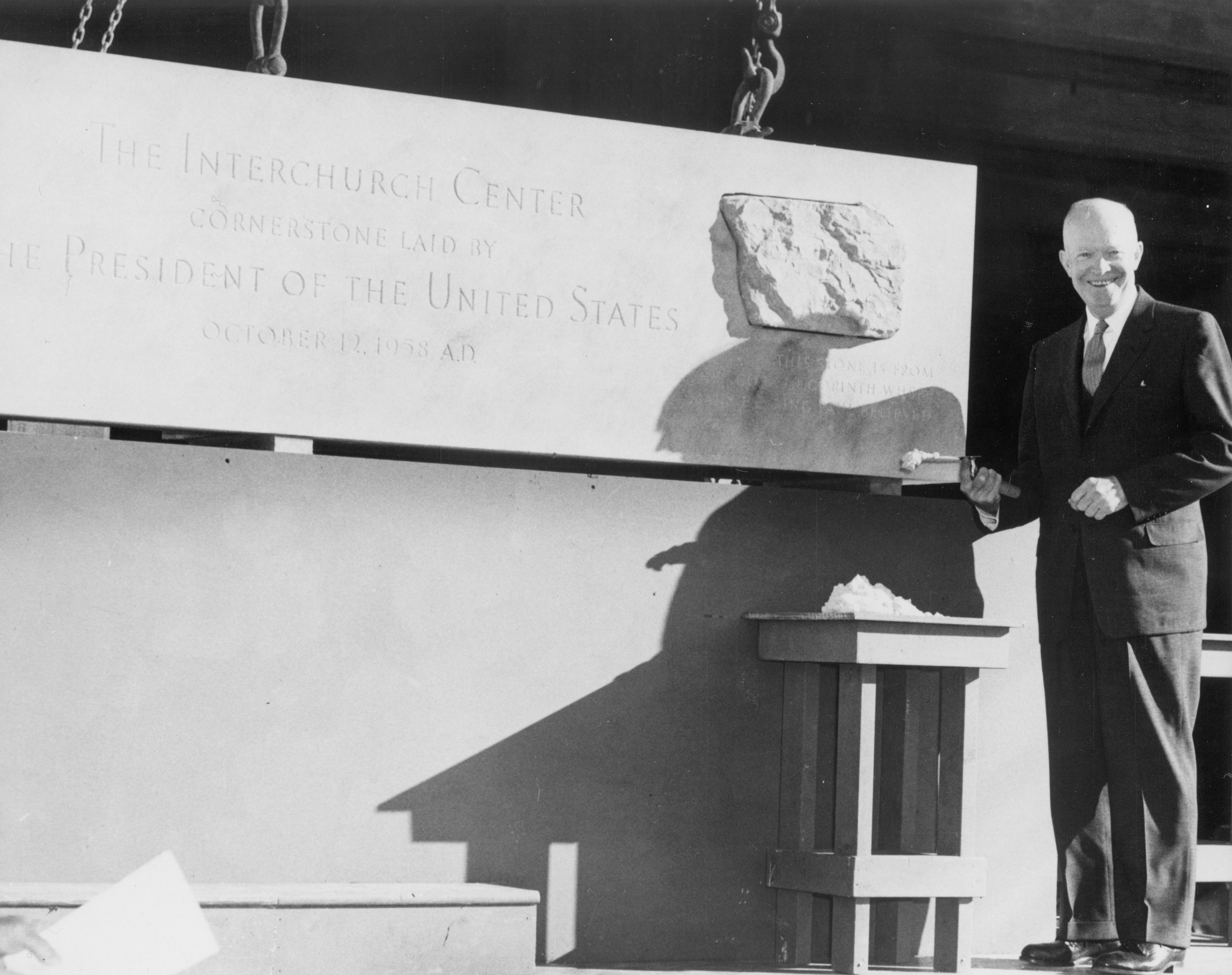
President Dwight D. Eisenhower laying the Interchurch Center's cornerstone on October 12, 1958

The center was built in 1958 with gifts by John D. Rockefeller Jr. and other donors, together with a consortium of religious denominations, with the objective of encouraging cooperative work among such diverse religious groups as the Orthodox, African-American, and mainstream Protestant denominations and to foster the growth of ecumenical bodies such as the National Council of Churches. A condition of the Rockefeller gift was that the exterior of the structure had to be clad in the same color limestone as Riverside Church, across 120th Street, the Rockefellers' church home at the time.

In the presence of a crowd of more than 30,000 gathered at the building site, the center's cornerstone was laid by then-President Dwight D. Eisenhower, whose Secretary of State, John Foster Dulles, and Secretary of Health, Education and Welfare, Arthur S. Flemming, were active in the work of the National Council of Churches.

=== Incidents ===
In 1969, James Forman, civil rights activist and executive director of the National Black Economic Development Conference (NBEDC), led a series of sit-ins at denominational offices in the building, demanding that the denominations pay reparations to black Americans. At the height of the protests, half of the center's 2,000 employees stayed away from work in support of Forman. Tenants of the building eventually obtained an injunction from the New York State Supreme Court, barring Forman and the NBEDC from the building.

Hands Around the God Box, an interfaith prayer vigil to end religious homophobia, was held at the Interchurch Center on June 24, 1994. More than 500 people from 15 LGBTQ religious groups joined hands and were linked by a rainbow ribbon that completely encircled the building.

== Tenants ==
The center's current occupants include mission boards, pension boards, and other agencies of several national denominations. Expanding on its original mission of providing a collaborative environment for a community of widely differing Christian denominations and their ecumenical activities, the center now also houses a growing number of interfaith groups, including Odyssey Networks and The Interfaith Center of New York, plus several Jewish and Muslim organizations.

Over the 50-year history of the facility, some national churches such as the Evangelical Lutheran Church in America and the Presbyterian Church (USA), following mergers with sister churches, relocated their primary offices to cities nearer to the majority of their constituencies, but have continued to maintain significant operations in the Interchurch Center.

Several city and state denominational offices, the Council of Churches of the City of New York, and groups as varied as Agricultural Missions, Inc., and the Foundation for Christian Higher Education in Asia also occupy space in the center, along with offices and classrooms of New York Theological Seminary, and offices of The Rockefeller Brothers Fund.

National interfaith ministries in the building include Religion Communicators Council, Odyssey Networks (a religious media distribution agency of the National Interfaith Cable Coalition), and the Interfaith Center for Corporate Responsibility.

== Architecture ==
The simplicity of the building's architecture, intended to complement rather than compete with the gothic architecture of surrounding institutional buildings, has caused some critics to disparage its design. Columbia University architecture historian Andrew Dolkart calls the Center "an undistinguished, bulky, limestone building." Other critics have called it "clumsily articulated," and "a squat cube".

=== Facilities and services ===
Amenities provided to organizations and agencies who occupy the center are:

- ecumenical chapel, complete with a major pipe organ installation;
- conference center with multiple breakout spaces, auditorium, boardroom;
- wellness center, offering travel immunizations, and medical consultations to the general public;
- ecumenical library, with 17,000 books and 55 periodical titles;
- full-service cafeteria, buffet dining room, and catering operation;
- art gallery where paintings, sculpture and photography exhibits are rotated throughout the year.
- multi-level parking garage beneath the building.

A Wednesday noontime concert series during the spring and fall features classical, gospel, jazz and choral music at no charge and open to the general public. The Interchurch Center Chorus and the Gospel Choir, both populated by tenant employees, present periodic concerts in the center's chapel.

== Transportation ==
The Interchurch Center is served by the M5 bus on Riverside Drive, M4, M104 buses along Broadway, and the M11 and M60 SBS buses on Amsterdam Avenue. In addition, the 1 train of the New York City Subway stops at 125th Street and Broadway.

== See also ==
- Ecumenical Centre, another building complex for multiple religious organizations in Geneva, Switzerland
