= Programme to Combat Racism =

- Parent organization: World Council of Churches

The Programme to Combat Racism (PCR) was a political programme of the World Council of Churches (WCC) during the 1970s, 1980s and 1990s. It funded a number of liberation movements and between 1979 and 1991 was thought to have donated a total of $9,749,500 to these groups.

== History ==
In 1970, Reader's Digest suggested that the PCR was contributing to fourteen groups involved in revolutionary guerrilla activities, some of which were Communist in ideology and receiving arms from the Soviet Union. In 1977, The Fraudulent Gospel was published in the United States and Britain. The front cover showed a graphic photo of 27 Black Rhodesians it claimed were "massacred by WCC-financed terrorists in Eastern Rhodesia in December 1976." Groups that benefitted from PCR's financial support included National Union for the Total Independence of Angola, People's Movement for the Liberation of Angola, Liberation Front of Mozambique, South West Africa People’s Organisation, Patriotic Front of Zimbabwe, African National Congress, and Pan Africanist Congress of Azania. They were accused of donating $85,000 to Zimbabwe African National Union in 1978. Controversy over PCR was expressed in Time in an article entitled Going Beyond Charity: Should Christian Cash Be Given to Terrorists? Further criticism has come from the Christian right. The Programme to Combat Racism was changed and concerns addressed through the “Special Commission".

== Accusations of anti-Zionism ==
The council has been described by Bat Ye'or as taking anti-Zionist positions in connection with its criticisms of Israeli policy. She believed the Council had focused disproportionately on activities and publications criticizing Israel in comparison to other human rights issues. Council members were characterized by Israel's former justice minister Amnon Rubinstein as anti-Zionist. The WCC rejected this accusation and, in 2005, WCC General Secretary Samuel Kobia said that anti-Semitism is a "sin against God and man" and "absolutely irreconcilable with the profession and practice of the Christian faith."
