= Council of Christian Churches of an African Approach in Europe =

The Council of Christian Churches of an African Approach in Europe (CCCAAE) is a Christian ecumenical organization established in 2001. It is a member of the World Council of Churches.

In 2003, the group organised the Third International Interdisciplinary Conference of the African Christian Diaspora in Europe.

== Notable member churches ==
France

- Good News Church

Germany

- Christ Apostolic Church
- Church of Pentecost
- Coptic Orthodox Church
- Deeper Christian Life Ministry
- Ethiopian Orthodox Tewahedo Church
- Kimbanguist Church
- New Jerusalem Church
- Redeemed Christian Church of God
