= World Summit of Religious Leaders =

The Summit of World Religious Leaders is an annual meeting of religious leaders. Although there are other Interfaith World Summits where religious leaders from a diverse array of faith traditions attend, these particular meetings are unique in that they deliver collaborative statements to the G8 political leaders about the mutual responsibility faith groups and political leaders share for improving the living conditions of the most vulnerable people and species in the world. These Summits have now met for one complete round of G8 meetings. The first meeting to deliver a statement to the G8 was held in the United Kingdom and was ecumenical. It became interfaith the following year when Russia hosted the event. The statements can be viewed at the G8 Research Group website.

== Round One of Meetings ==
- 2006 – Russia "World Summit of Religious Leaders"
- 2007 – Germany "Just Participation: A Call From Cologne"
- 2008 – Japan "A Proposal From People of Religion to Leaders of the Group of Eight"/"Call From Sapporo--World Religious Leaders Summit for Peace"
- 2009 – Italy "IV Summit of Religious Leaders on the Occasion of the G8"
- 2010 – Canada "A Time for Inspired Leadership"
- 2011 – France "Bordeaux Religious Leaders Summit"
- 2012 – United States "2012 Religious Leaders Statement for the G8 and G20"

== Round Two of Meetings and Initiatives ==
- 2013 -- United Kingdom "Global Religious Leaders Call on G8 to 'Strike at Causes of Poverty.'" This meeting was technologically mediated rather than face-to-face.

== Scholarly work ==
Peer-reviewed articles studying the significance of these meetings include:

- 2011 – "Religious Soft Power as Accountability Mechanism for Power in World Politics: The InterFaith Leaders' Summit(s)." This case study of the InterFaith Leaders' Summit(s) from 2005 to 2010 considers how interfaith leaders exercise public reputational and peer accountability among their constituents in relation to the G8/G20 leaders. The theoretical validity of the dialogue process is not contingent on political leader responsiveness but is ascertained using a complex theoretical standard for assessing the legitimacy of global governance institutions against which observations are then gauged. The InterFaith Dialogue is a specific illustration of a FAM that shows increasing compliance with the complex standard between 2005 and 2010. The Dialogue Mechanism FAM is a form of religious soft power that combines soft institution with soft technique. The next stage in the research is to identify specific characteristics of the FAM ideal type.
- 2012 – "Faith-Based Accountability Mechanism Typology: The 2011 Interfaith Summit as Soft Power in Global Governance." The conditions associated with the stability of democratic global governance have been a leading concern of political sociology. Globalization, a situation of "governance without government", has accountability gaps that International Nongovernmental Organizations—religious and secular—bridge with activism. They strengthen democratic norms by exercising soft power as accountability mechanisms in international relations. Religious and secular accountability mechanisms differ in structure and function. This article presents a Faith-Based Accountability Mechanism typology that outlines a set of attributes for an exercise of religious soft power that might strengthen the democratic process in global governance. A coalition service model that preserves the public trust in appropriate contexts is developed in contrast to monopolistic religious surveillance models. The typology is illustrated with case study data from the 2011 Interfaith Summit in Bordeaux, France.
- G8 Publications – The Munk School of Global Affairs included the civil society involvement of faith-based organizations, including the collaborative statements of religious leaders to the G8, in their Civil Society Report on Camp David.
- 2013 – "Reflexive Governance Dynamics Operative Within Round One of World Religious Leaders' Dialogue With the G8 (2005-2013)." This case study of the World Religious Leaders' Summits illustrates reflexive governance dynamics operative within the religious summitry process from 2005 to 2013. Past research explored reflexivity within the cultural capital produced by religious leaders and delivered to G8 political leaders. Data are drawn from qualitative interviews, questionnaires, and summit presentations to further explore how reflexivity variously opens up and closes down throughout the 9-year cycle. Rather than choosing between keeping up action capacity or opening problem handling for further contextualization, reflexive governance is best understood as that which both interplays and combines variously. A coevolutionary approach to the reflexive governance of religious summitry is discussed in light of the changing dynamics associated with the upcoming transition from Millennium Development Goals to the proposed Sustainable Development Goals.

== See also ==
- World Council of Churches
- Ecumenism
- World Parliament of Religions
- Conference of Secretaries of World Christian Communions
- Interfaith dialogue
- UNAOC – "The United Nations Alliance of Civilizations – an initiative to prevent violence and support social cohesion by promoting intercultural and interfaith dialogue".
