= World Council of Churches =

Inter-church organization

- World Council of Churches logo
- Abbreviation: WCC
- General secretary: Jerry Pillay
- Region: International
- Origin: 1948; 78 years ago
- Members: 356 (member churches)
- Official website: oikoumene.org

The World Council of Churches (WCC) is a worldwide Christian inter-church organization founded in 1948 to work for the cause of ecumenism. Its full members today include the Assyrian Church of the East, most jurisdictions of the Eastern Orthodox Church (including the Ecumenical Patriarchate of Constantinople), the Oriental Orthodox Churches, the Union of Utrecht, the Lutheran World Federation, the Anglican Communion, the Mennonite churches, the World Methodist Council, the Baptist World Alliance, the World Communion of Reformed Churches, the Moravian Church, the Malankara Mar Thoma Syrian Church, and several Pentecostal churches (but not the Pentecostal World Fellowship or the Assemblies of God). The Catholic Church is not a full member, but it sends delegates who have observer status to meetings.

The WCC describes itself as "a worldwide fellowship of 352 global, regional and sub-regional, national and local churches seeking unity, a common witness and Christian service". It has no head office as such, but its administrative centre is at the Ecumenical Centre in Geneva, Switzerland. The organization's members include denominations which claim to collectively represent over 600 million people across the world in more than 110 countries.

Many regional affiliates of the World Council of Churches, such as the Middle East Council of Churches and the National Council of Churches in Australia, work for the cause of Christian unity at the domestic level, with member denominations including the Oriental Orthodox churches, Lutheran churches, Catholic Church, Eastern Orthodox churches, Methodist churches, Anglican Communion, and Reformed churches among others.

== History ==
The Ecumenical Movement met with initial successes in the late 19th and early 20th centuries, including the Edinburgh Missionary Conference of 1910 (chaired by future WCC honorary president John R. Mott). In 1920, the former Patriarch of Constantinople, Germanus V, wrote a letter addressed 'To all the Churches of Christ, wherever they may be', urging closer co-operation among separated Christians, and suggesting a 'League of Churches', parallel to the newly founded League of Nations". Church leaders agreed in 1937 to establish a World Council of Churches, based on a merger of the Faith and Order Movement (under Charles Brent of the Episcopal Church of the United States) and Life and Work Movement (under Nathan Söderblom of the Lutheran Church of Sweden) organisations.

Its official establishment was deferred with the outbreak of World War II until 23 August 1948. Delegates of 147 churches assembled in Amsterdam to merge the Faith and Order Movement and Life and Work Movement. This was consolidated by a second meeting at Lund in 1950, for which the British Methodist Robert Newton Flew edited an influential volume of studies, The Nature of the Church. Subsequent mergers were with the International Missionary Council in 1961 and the World Council of Christian Education, with its roots in the 18th century Sunday School movement, in 1971.

WCC member churches include the Assyrian Church of the East and the Oriental Orthodox Churches, almost all of the Eastern Orthodox Churches and Lutheran Churches; the Moravian Church; the Anglican Communion; some Old Catholic Churches; the Methodist churches; the Baptists churches; the Presbyterian and other Reformed churches, a sampling of united and independent churches, and some Pentecostal churches.

Many churches who refused to join the WCC joined to form the World Evangelical Alliance.

Neither the WCC nor the U.S.-based National Council of Churches (NCC) include denominations such as Jehovah's Witnesses, The Church of Jesus Christ of Latter-day Saints (Mormons), and other groups which have historically refused to affirm certain widely accepted creeds of Christendom (for example, the Holy Trinity as canonized by the Nicene Creed).

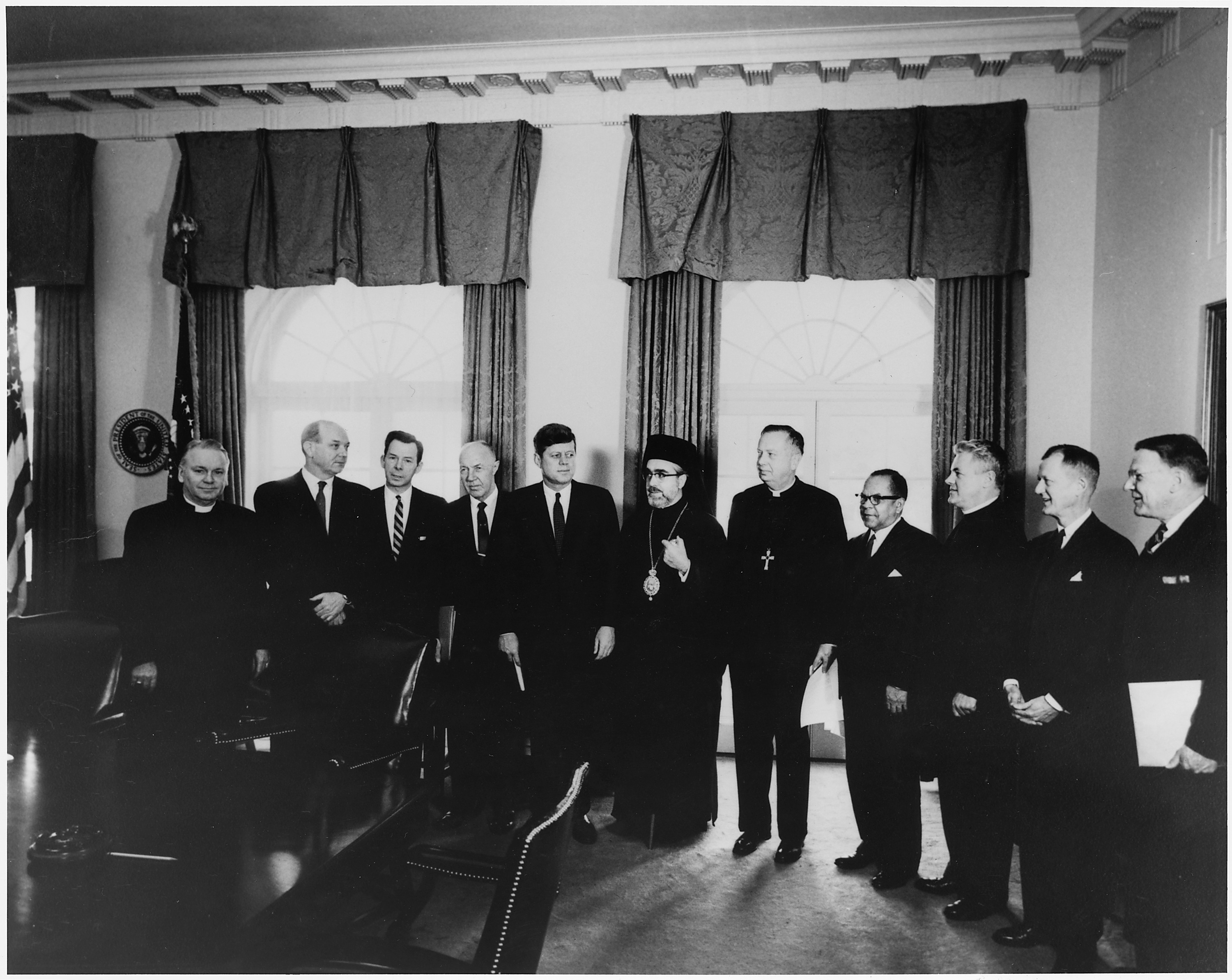
President John F. Kennedy with World Council of Churches Delegation. Bp. G. Brook Mosely, Sec. State Dean Rusk, Dr. Kenneth L. Maxwell, Dr. Frederick Nolde, President Kennedy, Archbishop Iakovos of America, Dr. Franklin Clark Fry, Bp. B. Julian Smith, Bp. John Wesley Lord, Judge James M. Tunnell Jr., Dr. Roswell Parkhurst Barnes. White House, Cabinet Room in 1962.

Delegates sent from the member churches meet every seven or eight years in an Assembly, which elects a Central Committee that governs between Assemblies. A variety of other committees and commissions answer to the Central Committee and its staff. Assemblies have been held since 1948.

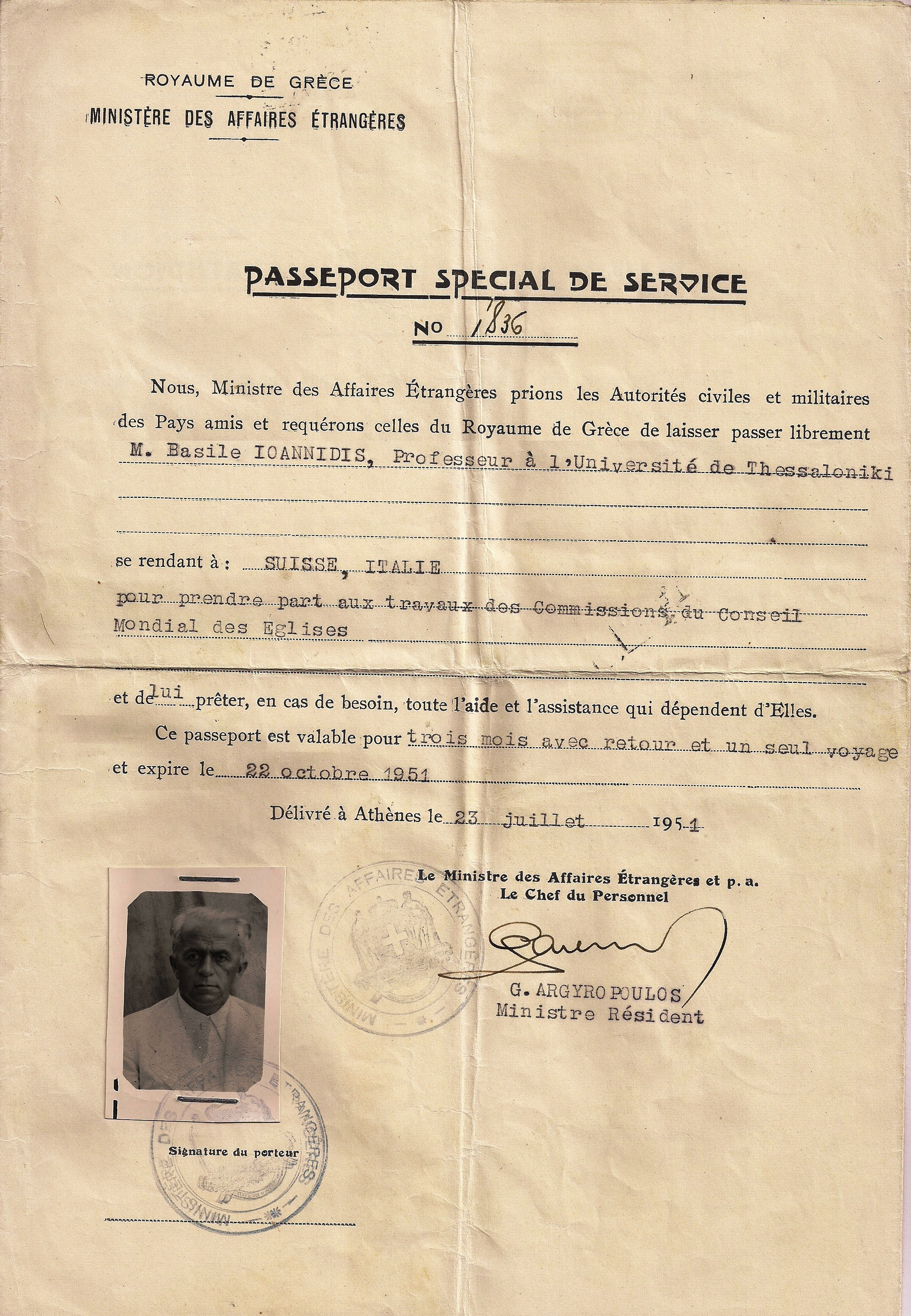
1951 Greek special passport for Italy & Switzerland and used to participate in the work of the "World Council of Churches"

The "human rights abuses in communist countries evoked grave concern among the leaders of the World Council of Churches." However, historian Christopher Andrew claims that, during the Cold War, a number of important WCC representatives of the Orthodox Church in Eastern Europe had been working for the KGB, and that they influenced the policy of the WCC. From 1955 to 1958, Robert S. Bilheimer co-chaired a WCC international commission to prepare a document addressing the threat of nuclear warfare during the Cold War.

At the 1961 conference, a 32-year-old Russian Orthodox Bishop named Aleksey Ridiger was sent as delegate to the assembly, and then appointed to the WCC's central committee. He was later elected as Russian patriarch in 1990 as Alexei II. At the same conference, the Romanian metropolitan Iustin Moisescu was sent as delegate. In 1977 he became the Romanian patriarch.

The ninth assembly took place in Porto Alegre, Brazil in February 2006, under the theme "God, in your grace, transform the world". During the first Assemblies, theologians Vasileios Ioannidis and Amilkas Alivizatos contributed significantly to the debates that led to the drafting of the "Toronto Statement", a foundational document which facilitated Eastern Orthodox participation in the organization and today it constitutes its ecclesiological charter.

The 10th Assembly was held in Busan, Republic of Korea, from 30 October to 8 November 2013.

In 2013 Dr. Agnes Abuom of Nairobi, from the Anglican Church of Kenya, was elected as moderator of the Central Committee of the World Council of Churches; she is the first woman and the first African to hold this position.

The 11th Assembly of the World Council of Churches took place in Karlsruhe, Germany, from 31 August to 8 September 2022, under the theme "Christ's love moves the world to reconciliation and unity".

== Member Churches ==
=== Members ===
- African Brotherhood Church
- African Christian Church & Schools
- African Church of the Holy Spirit
- Africa Inland Church of South Sudan and Sudan
- African Israel Church Nineveh
- African Methodist Episcopal Church
- African Methodist Episcopal Zion Church
- African Protestant Church
- American Baptist Churches USA
- Anglican Church in Aotearoa, New Zealand and Polynesia
- Anglican Church in Japan
- Anglican Church of Australia
- Anglican Church of Burundi
- Anglican Church of Canada
- Anglican Church of Kenya
- Anglican Church of Korea
- Anglican Church of South America
- Anglican Church of Southern Africa
- Anglican Church of Tanzania
- Armenian Apostolic Church (Holy See of Cilicia)
- Armenian Apostolic Church (Mother See of Holy Etchmiadzin)
- Association of Baptist Churches in Rwanda
- Association of Evangelical Reformed Churches of Burkina Faso
- Association of Mennonite Congregations in Germany
- Association The Church of God
- Bangladesh Baptist Church Sangha
- Baptist Association of El Salvador
- Baptist Convention of Haiti
- Baptist Convention of Nicaragua
- Baptist Union of Denmark
- Baptist Union of Great Britain
- Baptist Union of Hungary
- Baptist Union of New Zealand
- Batak Christian Community Church
- Bengal Orissa Bihar Baptist Convention
- Bolivian Evangelical Lutheran Church
- Canadian Yearly Meeting of the Religious Society of Friends (Quakers)
- Catholic Diocese of the Old Catholics in Germany
- China Christian Council
- Christian Biblical Church
- Christian Church (Disciples of Christ) in Canada
- Christian Church (Disciples of Christ) in the United States
- Christian Church of Central Sulawesi
- Christian Church of Sumba
- Christian Churches New Zealand
- Christian Evangelical Church in Minahasa
- Christian Evangelical Church of Sangihe Talaud
- Christian Methodist Episcopal Church
- Christian Protestant Angkola Church
- Christian Protestant Church in Indonesia
- Church in the Province of the West Indies
- Church in Wales
- Church of Bangladesh
- Church of Central Africa Presbyterian – Blantyre Synod
- Church of Ceylon
- Church of Christ - Harris Mission (Harrist Church)
- Church of Christ in Congo - Anglican Community of Congo
- Church of Christ in Congo - Baptist Community of Congo
- Church of Christ in Congo - Community of Disciples of Christ in Congo
- Church of Christ in Congo - Evangelical Community of Congo
- Church of Christ in Congo - Mennonite Community in Congo
- Church of Christ in Congo - Presbyterian Community of Congo
- Church of Christ in Congo - Presbyterian Community of Kinshasa
- Church of Christ in Congo - Protestant Baptist Church in Africa / Episcopal Baptist Community in Africa
- Church of Christ in Thailand
- Church of Christ Light of the Holy Spirit
- Church of Cyprus
- Church of England
- Church of Greece
- Church of Ireland
- Church of Jesus Christ in Madagascar
- Church of Melanesia
- Church of Nigeria
- Church of North India
- Church of Norway
- Church of Pakistan
- Church of Scotland
- Church of South India
- Church of Sweden
- Church of the Brethren
- Church of the Brethren in Nigeria
- Church of the Province of Central Africa
- Church of the Province of Myanmar
- Church of the Province of the Indian Ocean
- Church of the Province of West Africa
- Church of Uganda
- Churches of Christ in Australia
- Community of Baptist Churches in Central Africa
- Congregational Christian Church in American Samoa
- Congregational Christian Church in Samoa
- Congregational Christian Church of Niue
- Congregational Christian Church of Tuvalu
- Convention of Philippine Baptist Churches
- Coptic Orthodox Church
- Council of African Instituted Churches of Southern Africa
- Council of Baptist Churches in North East India
- Czechoslovak Hussite Church
- Dutch Reformed Church
- East Java Christian Church
- Ecumenical Patriarchate of Constantinople
- Episcopal Anglican Church of Brazil
- Episcopal Church in Jerusalem and the Middle East
- Episcopal Church in the Philippines
- Eritrean Orthodox Tewahedo Church
- Estonian Evangelical Lutheran Church
- Ethiopian Evangelical Church Mekane Yesus
- Ethiopian Orthodox Tewahedo Church
- Evangelical Baptist Church in Angola
- Evangelical Baptist Union of Italy
- Evangelical Christian Church in Halmahera
- Evangelical Christian Church in Tanah Papua
- Evangelical Church in Central Germany
- Evangelical Church in New Caledonia and the Loyalty Islands
- Evangelical Church of Cameroon
- Evangelical Church of Congo
- Evangelical Church of Czech Brethren
- Evangelical Church of Gabon
- Evangelical Church of Greece
- Protestant Church of the Augsburg and Helvetic Confessions in Austria
- Evangelical Church of the Augsburg Confession in Poland
- Evangelical Church of the Augsburg Confession in Romania
- Evangelical Church of the Augsburg Confession in Slovakia
- Evangelical Church of the Disciples of Christ in Argentina
- Evangelical Church of the Lutheran Confession in Brazil
- Evangelical Church of the River Plate
- Evangelical Congregational Church in Angola
- Evangelical Lutheran Church in America
- Evangelical Lutheran Church in Bavaria
- Evangelical Lutheran Church in Brunswick
- Evangelical Lutheran Church in Canada
- Evangelical Lutheran Church in Chile
- Evangelical Lutheran Church in Congo
- Evangelical Lutheran Church in Denmark
- Evangelical Lutheran Church in Hungary
- Evangelical Lutheran Church in Jordan and the Holy Land
- Evangelical Lutheran Church in Namibia
- Evangelical Lutheran Church in Northern Germany
- Evangelical Lutheran Church in Southern Africa
- Evangelical Lutheran Church in Tanzania
- Evangelical Lutheran Church in the Republic of Namibia
- Evangelical Lutheran Church in Zimbabwe
- Evangelical Lutheran Church of Finland
- Evangelical Lutheran Church of Ghana
- Evangelical Lutheran Church of Hanover
- Evangelical Lutheran Church of Iceland
- Evangelical Lutheran Church of Latvia
- Evangelical Lutheran Church of Papua New Guinea
- Evangelical Lutheran Church of Romania
- Evangelical Lutheran Church of Saxony
- Evangelical Lutheran Church of Schaumburg-Lippe
- Evangelical Methodist Church in Bolivia
- Evangelical Methodist Church in Italy
- Evangelical Methodist Church in the Philippines
- Evangelical Methodist Church of Argentina
- Evangelical Pentecostal Mission of Angola
- Evangelical Presbyterian Church, Ghana
- Evangelical Presbyterian Church in South Africa
- Evangelical Presbyterian Church of Egypt Synod of the Nile
- Evangelical Presbyterian Church of Iran
- Evangelical Presbyterian Church of Portugal
- Evangelical Presbyterian Church of Togo
- Evangelical Reformed Church of Angola
- Free Pentecostal Missions Church of Chile
- Free Wesleyan Church of Tonga (Methodist Church in Tonga)
- Greek Orthodox Patriarchate of Alexandria and All Africa
- Greek Orthodox Patriarchate of Antioch and All the East
- Greek Orthodox Patriarchate of Jerusalem
- Holy Apostolic Catholic Assyrian Church of the East
- Hong Kong Council of the Church of Christ in China
- Hungarian Reformed Church in America
- Independent Presbyterian Church of Brazil
- Indonesian Christian Church (GKI)
- Indonesian Christian Church (HKI)
- International Council of Community Churches
- International Evangelical Church
- Jamaica Baptist Union
- Javanese Christian Churches
- Kalimantan Evangelical Church
- Karo Batak Protestant Church
- Kenya Evangelical Lutheran Church
- Kiribati Uniting Church
- Korean Christian Church in Japan
- Korean Methodist Church
- Lao Evangelical Church
- Latvian Evangelical Lutheran Church Abroad
- Lesotho Evangelical Church
- Lusitanian Church of Portugal
- Lutheran Church in Liberia
- Malagasy Lutheran Church
- Malankara Orthodox Syrian Church
- Maohi Protestant Church
- Mar Thoma Syrian Church of Malabar
- Mara Evangelical Church
- Mennonite Church in the Netherlands
- Methodist Church
- Methodist Church Ghana
- Methodist Church in Brazil
- Methodist Church in Cuba
- Methodist Church in Fiji and Rotuma
- Methodist Church in India
- Methodist Church in Indonesia
- Methodist Church in Ireland
- Methodist Church in Kenya
- Methodist Church in Malaysia
- Methodist Church in Singapore
- Methodist Church in the Caribbean and the Americas
- Methodist Church in Zimbabwe
- Methodist Church Nigeria
- Methodist Church of Chile
- Methodist Church of Mexico
- Methodist Church of New Zealand
- Methodist Church of Peru
- Methodist Church of Puerto Rico
- Methodist Church of Samoa
- Methodist Church of Southern Africa
- Methodist Church of Togo
- Methodist Church of Uruguay
- Methodist Church Sierra Leone
- Methodist Church, Sri Lanka
- Methodist Church, Upper Myanmar
- Moravian Church, Eastern West Indies Province
- Moravian Church in America
- Moravian Church in Jamaica
- Moravian Church in Nicaragua
- Moravian Church in South Africa
- Moravian Church in Suriname
- Moravian Church in Tanzania
- Moravian Church in Western Europe
- Myanmar Baptist Convention
- National Baptist Convention of America, Inc.
- National Baptist Convention USA, Inc.
- National Evangelical Synod of Syria and Lebanon
- Native Baptist Church of Cameroon
- Nias Christian Protestant Church
- Nigerian Baptist Convention
- Old Catholic Church in Austria
- Old Catholic Church in the Netherlands
- Old-Catholic Church of Switzerland
- Old-Catholic Mariavite Church in Poland
- Orthodox Autocephalous Church of Albania
- Orthodox Church in America
- Orthodox Church in Japan
- Orthodox Church in the Czech Lands and Slovakia
- Orthodox Church of Finland
- Pasundan Christian Church
- Pentecostal Church of Chile
- Pentecostal Mission Church
- Philippine Independent Church
- Polish Autocephalous Orthodox Church
- Polish Catholic Church in Poland
- Polish National Catholic Church
- Presbyterian Church in Cameroon
- Presbyterian Church in Canada
- Presbyterian Church in Rwanda
- Presbyterian Church in Taiwan
- Presbyterian Church in the Republic of Korea
- Presbyterian Church of Africa
- Presbyterian Church of Aotearoa New Zealand
- Presbyterian Church of Cameroon
- Presbyterian Church in Colombia
- Presbyterian Church of East Africa
- Presbyterian Church of Ghana
- Presbyterian Church of Korea
- Presbyterian Church of Liberia
- Presbyterian Church of Mozambique
- Presbyterian Church of Nigeria
- Presbyterian Church of Pakistan
- Presbyterian Church of South Sudan
- Presbyterian Church of Trinidad and Tobago
- Presbyterian Church of Vanuatu
- Presbyterian Church of Wales
- Presbyterian Church (USA)
- Presbyterian-Reformed Church in Cuba
- Progressive National Baptist Convention
- Protestant Christian Batak Church
- Protestant Christian Church in Bali
- Protestant Church in Germany
- Protestant Church in Indonesia
- Protestant Church in Sabah
- Protestant Church in South-East Sulawesi
- Protestant Church in Switzerland
- Protestant Church in the Moluccas
- Protestant Church in the Netherlands
- Protestant Church in Timor Lorosa'e
- Protestant Church in Western Indonesia
- Protestant Church of Algeria
- Protestant Evangelical Church in Timor
- Protestant Methodist Church of Benin
- Province of the Anglican Church in Rwanda
- Province of the Episcopal Church of South Sudan
- Province of the Episcopal Church of Sudan
- Reformed Christian Church in Serbia & Montenegro
- Reformed Christian Church in Slovakia
- Reformed Church in America
- Reformed Church in Hungary
- Reformed Church in Romania
- Reformed Church in Zambia
- Reformed Church in Zimbabwe
- Reformed Church of Christ for Nations
- Reformed Presbyterian Church of Equatorial Guinea
- Religious Society of Friends: Friends General Conference
- Religious Society of Friends: Friends United Meeting
- Remonstrant Brotherhood
- Romanian Orthodox Church
- Russian Orthodox Church
- Salvadorean Lutheran Synod
- Samavesam of Telugu Baptist Churches
- Scottish Episcopal Church
- Serbian Orthodox Church
- Silesian Evangelical Church of the Augsburg Confession
- Simalungun Protestant Christian Church
- Slovak Evangelical Church of the Augsburg Confession in Serbia & Montenegro
- Spanish Evangelical Church
- Spanish Reformed Episcopal Church
- Syrian Orthodox Patriarchate of Antioch and All the East
- The African Church
- The Apostolic Faith Mission of South Africa
- The Church of the Lord (Prayer Fellowship) Worldwide
- The Episcopal / Anglican Province of Alexandria
- The Episcopal Church
- The First African Church Mission
- Toraja Church
- Union of Baptist Churches in Cameroon
- Union of Protestant Churches in Alsace and Lorraine
- Union of the Armenian Evangelical Churches in the Near East
- Union of Welsh Independents
- United Church in Jamaica and the Cayman Islands
- United Church in Papua New Guinea
- United Church in the Solomon Islands
- United Church of Canada
- United Church of Christ
- United Church of Christ - Congregational in the Marshall Islands
- United Church of Christ in Japan
- United Church of Christ in the Philippines
- United Church of Christ in Zimbabwe
- United Church of Zambia
- United Congregational Church of Southern Africa
- United Evangelical Lutheran Church
- United Evangelical Lutheran Churches in India
- United Free Church of Scotland
- United Methodist Church
- United Methodist Church of Ivory Coast
- United Presbyterian Church of Brazil
- United Protestant Church of Belgium
- United Protestant Church of Curaçao
- United Protestant Church of France
- United Reformed Church
- Uniting Church in Australia
- Uniting Church in Sweden
- Uniting Presbyterian Church in Southern Africa
- Uniting Reformed Church in Southern Africa
- Waldensian Church

== Events and presidents ==
=== Assemblies ===
The World Council of Churches has held 11 Assemblies to date, starting with the founding assembly in 1948:

1. Amsterdam, Netherlands, 22 August – 4 September 1948
2. Evanston, Illinois, United States, 15–31 August 1954
3. New Delhi, India, 19 November – 5 December 1961
4. Uppsala, Sweden, 4–20 July 1968
5. Nairobi, Kenya, 23 November – 10 December 1975
6. Vancouver, British Columbia, Canada 24 July – 10 August 1983
7. Canberra, ACT, Australia, 7–21 February 1991
8. Harare, Zimbabwe, 3–14 December 1998
9. Porto Alegre, Rio Grande do Sul, Brazil, 14–23 February 2006
10. Busan, South Korea, 30 October – 8 November 2013
11. Karlsruhe, Germany, 31 August – 8 September 2022

=== Presidents ===
Presidents elected at the 11th Assembly are:

- Africa: Rev. Dr. Rufus Okikiola Ositelu, (Church of the Lord (Aladura))
- Asia: Rev. Dr Henriette Hutabarat-Lebang (Gereja Toraja)
- Europe: Rev. Dr. Susan Durber (United Reformed Church)
- Latin America and Caribbean: Rev. Philip Silvin Wright (Anglican Diocese of Belize, Church in the Province of the West Indies)
- North America: Rev. Angelique Walker-Smith (National Baptist Convention USA)
- Pacific: Rev. François Pihaatae (Maòhi Protestant Church)
- Eastern Orthodox: H.E. Metropolitan Dr. Vasilios of Constantia – Ammochostos, Church of Cyprus
- Oriental Orthodox: H.H. Catholicos Aram I (Armenian Apostolic Church of Cilicia)

Former presidents of the World Council of Churches include:

- The Rev. Gloria Nohemy Ulloa Alvarado (Presbyterian Church in Colombia)
- Chang Sang (Presbyterian Church in the Republic of Korea)
- T. C. Chao, Chinese theologian
- Ignatius Zakka I Iwas (Patriarch of Antioch and all of the East Syriac Orthodox Church)
- John X of Antioch (Patriarch of the Greek Orthodox Church of Antioch)
- Karekin II (Catholicos of the Armenian Apostolic Church)
- Rev. Dr. S.A.E. Nababan, Indonesian theologian
- Rev. Martin Niemöller, the famous Protestant anti-Nazi theologian
- Mele'ana Puloka (Free Wesleyan Church of Tonga)
- Mary-Anne Plaatjies van Huffel (Uniting Reformed Church in Southern Africa)
- Archbishop Anders Wejryd (Church of Sweden)

=== General secretaries ===
Since the World Council of Churches was officially founded in 1948, the following men have served as general secretary:

Years	Name	Churches	Nationality
1948–1966	W. A. Visser 't Hooft	Dutch Reformed Church/Federation of Swiss Protestant Churches, Geneva	Netherlands
1966–1972	Eugene Carson Blake	United Presbyterian Church (USA)	United States
1972–1984	Philip A. Potter	Methodist Church	Dominica
1985–1992	Emilio Castro	Evangelical Methodist Church of Uruguay	Uruguay
1993–2003	Konrad Raiser	Protestant Church in Germany (EKD)	Germany
2004–2009	Samuel Kobia	Methodist Church in Kenya	Kenya
2010–2020	Olav Fykse Tveit	Church of Norway	Norway
2020–2022	Ioan Sauca	Romanian Orthodox Church	Romania
2023–	Jerry Pillay	Uniting Presbyterian Church in Southern Africa	South Africa

== Commissions and teams ==
There are two complementary approaches to ecumenism: dialogue and action. The Faith and Order Movement and Life and Work Movement represent these approaches. These approaches are reflected in the work of the WCC in its commissions, these being:

- Echos – Commission on Youth (ages 18–30)
- Commission of the Churches on Diakonia and Development
- Commission on Education and Ecumenical Formation
- Commission of the Churches on International Affairs
- Commission on Justice, Peace and Creation
- Commission on World Mission and Evangelism
- Faith and Order Plenary Commission and the Faith and Order Standing Commission
- Joint Consultative Group with Pentecostals
- Joint Working Group WCC – Catholic Church (Vatican)
- Reference Group on the Decade to Overcome Violence
- Reference Group on Inter-Religious Relations
- Special Commission on Orthodox Participation in the WCC

=== Diakonia and development and international relations commissions ===
The WCC acts through both its member churches and other religious and social organizations to coordinate ecumenical, evangelical, and social action.

Current WCC programs include a Decade to Overcome Violence, an international campaign to combat AIDS/HIV in Africa and the Justice, Peace and Integrity of Creation (JPIC) initiative.

=== Faith and Order Commission ===
WCC's Faith and Order Commission has been successful in working toward consensus on Baptism, Eucharist, and Ministry, on the date of Easter, on the nature and purpose of the church (ecclesiology), and on ecumenical hermeneutics.

==== Texts ====
- Baptism, Eucharist and Ministry (Faith and Order Paper No. 111, the "Lima Text"; 1982)
- The Churchː Towards a Common Vision (Faith and Order Paper no. 214; 2013) after The Nature and Mission of the Church – A Stage on the Way to a Common Statement (Faith and Order Paper no. 198; 2005) and The Nature and Purpose of the Church (Faith and Order Paper no. 181; 1998)
- Towards a Common Date of Easter

=== Justice, Peace and Creation Commission ===
Justice, Peace and Integrity of Creation (JPIC) has drawn many elements together with an environmental focus. Its mandate is:

To analyze and reflect on justice, peace and creation in their interrelatedness, to promote values and practices that make for a culture of peace, and to work towards a culture of solidarity with young people, women, Indigenous Peoples and racially and ethnically oppressed people.

Focal issues have been globalization and the emergence of new social movements (in terms of people bonding together in the struggle for justice, peace, and the protection of creation).

Attention has been given to issues around:

- economy
- environment
- Indigenous Peoples
- peace
- people with disabilities
- racism
- women
- youth

=== Relations with the Roman Catholic Church ===
The largest Christian body, the Roman Catholic Church, is not a member of the WCC, but has worked closely with the council for more than three decades and sends observers to all major WCC conferences as well as to its Central Committee meetings and the Assemblies (cf. Joint Working Group).

The Pontifical Council for Promoting Christian Unity also nominates 12 members to the WCC's Faith and Order Commission as full members. While not a member of the WCC, the Catholic Church is a member of some other ecumenical bodies at regional and national levels, for example, the National Council of Churches in Australia and the National Council of Christian Churches in Brazil (CONIC).

Pope Pius XI stated in 1928, that the only means by which the world Christian community was to return to faith, was to return to Roman Catholic worship. In this regard, the Papacy rejected, to a great extent, the idea of the participation of the Catholic Church within the World Council of Churches.

Pius XI stated that the ‘One True Church’ was that of the Roman Catholic denomination, and therefore there was the implication that the Catholic Church was not permitted at this stage to engage with other denominations, which the Papacy considered to be irrelevant. A similar policy was followed by his successor, Pope Pius XII; the Catholic Church, therefore, did not attend the 1948 meeting of the WCC, in addition to the idea that all members of the Church were barred from attending WCC conferences.

Pope John XXIII took a different stance however, and in 1958 he was elected as the head of the Catholic Church. Ecumenism was a new element of Catholic ideology which had been permitted, which was signified to a great extent, when John XXIII met with the then Archbishop of Canterbury, Geoffrey Fisher. This was the first meeting between an Archbishop of Canterbury, and the Pope in the Vatican for 600 years. John XXIII later developed the office of the Secretariat for Promoting Christian Unity; which symbolised a dramatic shift in support for the ecumenical movement, from the Catholic Church, led from the Vatican. 1961 saw Catholic members attend the Delhi conference of the WCC, which marked a significant shift in attitude toward the WCC from the Papacy. There was the idea in addition to this, that the Pope invited non-Catholics to attend the Vatican II Council. This new approach to inter-denominational relations was marked within the Unitatis Redintegratio decree.

This document marked several key reforms within the Catholic approach:

I. ‘Separated brethren’ was the new term for non-Catholics, as opposed to the previously used ‘heretics’

II. Both Catholic and non-Catholic elements are held responsible for the schism between Catholicism and the Protestant movement

III. Non-Catholics are recognised for the contributions that they make to Christian belief overall.

Further reforms have been enacted with regard to the nature of the Catholic Church on the world stage, for instance the 1965 union with the Patriarch of Constantinople, whereby the 1054 schism was undermined. In addition to this, Michael Ramsay, the then Archbishop of Canterbury, received an episcopal ring in 1966; a mark of union which had not been seen since prior to the Reformation. Moreover, the Anglican, Roman Catholic International Committee was additionally established as a means of promoting communication and cohesion between the two denominations. This has since marked a new level of participation of the Catholic Faith in the aforementioned ecumenical movement, and therefore is the basis for increased participation from the faith, in the WCC.

=== Special Commission on Orthodox Participation in the WCC ===
A Special Commission was set up by the eighth Harare Assembly in December 1998 to address Orthodox concerns about WCC membership and the council's decision-making style, public statements, worship practices, and other issues. It issued its final report in 2006. Specific issues that it clarified were that the WCC does not formulate doctrine, does not have authority to rule on moral issues, nor does it have any ecclesiastical authority. Such authority is entirely internal to each individual member church. It proposed that the WCC adopt a consensus method of decision making. It proposed that Orthodox members be brought in parity with non-Orthodox members. It further proposed clarification that inter-confessional prayer at WCC events is not worship, particularly "it should avoid giving the impression of being the worship of a church", and confessional and inter-confessional prayer each be specifically identified as such at WCC events.

== Peace journalism ==
The WCC is also a prominent supporter and practitioning body for Peace journalism: journalism practice that aims to avoid a value bias in favor of violence that often characterizes coverage of conflict.

== Spin-offs and related organizations ==
The ACT Alliance, bringing together over 100 church-backed relief and development organizations worldwide, was born out of the merger of ACT International (Action by Churches Together International) and ACT Development (Action by Churches Together for Development) in March 2010. Both ACT International, established in 1995, and ACT Development (2007) were created through the leadership of the World Council of Churches (WCC). The two bodies coordinated the work of agencies related to the member churches of the WCC and the Lutheran World Federation in the areas of humanitarian emergencies and poverty reduction respectively.

The Ecumenical Advocacy Alliance was officially founded in December 2000 at a meeting convened by the WCC. There are currently 73 churches and Christian organizations that are members of the Alliance, from Catholic, Evangelical, Orthodox and Protestant traditions. These members, representing a combined constituency of tens of millions of people around the world, are committed to working together in public witness and action for justice on defined issues of common concern. Current campaigns are on Food and on HIV and AIDS.

The Ecumenical Church Loan Fund (ECLOF) was founded in 1946 as one of the world's first international micro-credit institutions in the service of the poor. Willem Visser 't Hooft, then general secretary of the "WCC in process of formation" played an important role in founding ECLOF. It was he who sketched the prospects and challenges for the proposed institution and gave specific ideas on potential sources of funds. His inspiration and teamwork marked the beginning of a long and fruitful cooperation between ECLOF and the WCC.

The Ecumenical Development Cooperative Society U.A (now known as Oikocredit) was developed from discussions at the 1968 Uppsala 4th Assembly, regarding church divestment from financial institutions supporting apartheid-era South Africa and the war in Vietnam. After several years of planning, the cooperative society was founded in 1975 in the Netherlands to provide an alternative ethical investment vehicle to church institutions, by providing credit to productive enterprises serving economically disadvantaged populations. Originally organized for large institutional members of the WCC, by 1976 local congregations developed Support Associations to enable congregations as well as individuals to participate. EDCS became independent from the WCC in 1977.

Ecumenical News International (ENI) was launched in 1994 as a global news service reporting on ecumenical developments and other news of the Christian churches, and giving religious perspectives on news developments worldwide. The joint sponsors of ENI, which was based at the Ecumenical Centre in Geneva, Switzerland, were the World Council of Churches, the Lutheran World Federation, the World Alliance of Reformed Churches, and the Conference of European Churches, which also had their headquarters at the Ecumenical Centre. A shortage of funds led to the suspension of the work of ENI in 2012. As of 2024 ENI remains closed.

== Regional/national councils ==
The WCC has not sought the organic union of different Christian denominations, but it has, however, facilitated dialogue and supported local, national, and regional dialogue and cooperation.

Membership in a regional or national council does not mean that the particular group is also a member of the WCC.

- Africa
  - All Africa Conference of Churches
  - Organization of African Instituted Churches
- Asia (including Australia and New Zealand)
  - Christian Conference of Asia (CCA), Hong Kong
  - National Council of Churches in Australia
  - National Council of Churches in the Philippines
- Caribbean
  - Caribbean Conference of Churches
- Europe
  - Conference of European Churches, Geneva, Switzerland
  - Council of Christian Churches of an African Approach in Europe
- Latin America
  - Latin American Council of Churches
- Middle East
  - Middle East Council of Churches
- North America
  - Canadian Council of Churches
  - National Council of the Churches of Christ in the USA
- Pacific
  - Pacific Conference of Churches, Suva, Fiji

== Criticism ==
=== Alleged neglect of suffering churches in Eastern Europe ===
Some historians, the U.S. State Department and former KGB officers themselves have alleged and provided corroborating evidence that the KGB's influence directly, or through lobbying by means of a front organization, the Christian Peace Conference, resulted in the WCC's failure to recognize or act on calls for help from persecuted East European Christians at the 1983 Vancouver General Assembly.

=== Claims of infiltration and influence by the KGB ===
It is claimed the KGB has infiltrated and influenced past WCC councils and policy. In 1992, Father Gleb Yakunin, a vice Chairman of a Russian parliamentary commission that investigated the activities of the KGB, citing verbatim KGB reports, claimed that its Fifth Directorate was actively involved in influencing WCC policy from 1967 to 1989. For example, in the 1983 WCC General Assembly in Vancouver, one cited document described the presence and activities of 47 KGB agents to secure the election of an "acceptable" candidate as General Secretary. The Mitrokhin Archive reveals more about the depth of the penetration and influence wielded by the KGB over the WCC. Metropolitan Nikodim was a KGB agent, codenamed SVYATOSLAV, who served as one of six WCC Presidents from 1975 until his death. His earlier intervention had resulted in the WCC making no comment on the invasion of Czechoslovakia. As a result of his influence and that of other agents, it is claimed the USSR was rarely publicly criticised. In 1989, copies of the KGB documents claim "the WCC executive and central committee adopted public statements (eight) and messages (three)" which corresponded to its own political direction. Appeals from suffering dissidents both from within the Russian Orthodox Church and Protestants were ignored in 1983. Metropolitan Aleksi Ridiger of Tallinn and Estonia was repeatedly alleged to be a KGB agent codenamed DROZDOV, who in 1988 was awarded an honorary citation for services to the KGB by its chairman. Despite official disavowals, The Guardian described the evidence as "compelling". In 1990 he became Alexius II, the 15th Patriarch of the Russian Orthodox Church. Upon his death in 2008, the WCC's official tribute, by its Council officers, described him as "courageous", "supportive and constructive" and the recipient of "abundant blessing", no reference was made to the allegations.

=== Attitude towards Israel ===
The World Council of Churches has been described as taking an adversarial position toward the state of Israel. It has also been claimed the council has focused particularly on activities and publications criticizing Israel in comparison with other human rights issues. It is similarly claimed that it downplayed appeals from Egyptian Copts about human rights abuses under Sadat and Mubarak, in order to focus on its neighbour. In 2009, the Council called for an international boycott on goods produced in Israeli settlements, which it described as 'illegal, unjust' and 'incompatible with peace'. In 2013, the General Secretary was reported to claim in Cairo, "We support the Palestinians. The WCC supports the Palestinians, because they are in the right." The WCC's Ecumenical Accompaniment Programme in Palestine and Israel (EAPPI) has been criticised by the Board of Deputies of British Jews for promoting "an inflammatory and partisan programme at the expense of its interfaith relations". The WCC secretariat was involved in preparing and helped disseminate the Kairos Palestine Document, which declares "the Israeli occupation of Palestinian land is a sin against God and humanity because it deprives the Palestinians of their basic human rights", and in the view of one critic, its "authors want to see a single state". On the other hand, the WCC claims "Antisemitism is sin against God and man".

=== Opposition to Christian Zionism ===
Christian Zionism, which has long represented a major thread of historic and contemporary Protestants, is characterised as a view which "distort(s) the interpretation of the Word of God" and "damage(s) intra-Christian relations".

In this context, what is a source of concern is that Islamic fundamentalisms are giving rise to a counter reaction of other religious fundamentalisms, the most dangerous of which is Jewish fundamentalism which exploits the Islamic fundamentalist phenomenon to justify before western societies the distasteful aberrations of Zionism in Palestine.

— WCC working paper, Lebanon, May 2013

Frank Chikane, moderator of the Commission of the Churches on International Affairs (CCIA) of the World Council of Churches (WCC), was criticised for using the term 'demons' to describe advocacy for Zionism in 2021.

On January 4, 2023, World Council of Churches general secretary Jerry Pillay joined the Episcopal Diocese of Jerusalem and all the churches of the Holy Land in condemning the desecration of the historic Protestant cemetery on Mount Zion.

On 16 May 2023, the World Council of Churches condemned the Nakba, noting that "the catastrophe Palestinian families experienced 75 years ago, continues to cause unresolved dispossession and suffering for many Palestinians". Munther Isaac, moderator of the Global Kairos for Justice Coalition, recalled that a number of Arab Christian villages were destroyed during the Nakba.

== See also ==
- Lima Liturgy
- Ludwig Ingwer Nommensen
- John R. Mott
- John Romanides
- Joseph Oldham
- Jeanne Audrey Powers
- Nathan Soderblom
- Charles Henry Brent
- Christian ecumenism
- Ecumenical Association of Third World Theologians
- World Summit of Religious Leaders
- Programme to Combat Racism
- Authorship of the Bible
- List of the largest Protestant bodies
- Jennifer Marianne Hart
- Buku Ende
