= Jerry Pillay =

South-African Reformed pastor (born 1965)

The Reverend Jerry Pillay
- General Secretary, the United Presbyterian Church of South Africa
- Church: Uniting Presbyterian Church in Southern Africa
- Other posts: President, the World Communion of Reformed Churches; General Secretary, World Council of Churches from January 2023

Personal details
- Born: 1965 (age 60–61) South Africa
- Denomination: Uniting Presbyterian Church in Southern Africa
- Education: University of Durban-Westville; University of Cape Town

Jerry Pillay is the current (since 2023) General Secretary of the World Council of Churches. He is a Reformed pastor, a member of the Uniting Presbyterian Church in Southern Africa, a former professor of theology at the University of Pretoria where he headed the Department of History and Ecclesiology and was Dean of the Faculty of Theology and Religion. He was elected president of the World Communion of Reformed Churches (WCRC) in 2010 and, in June 2022, General Secretary of the World Council of Churches (WCC), taking office on 1 January 2023.

== Biography ==
Pillay was born in 1965 into a family of Indian origin who had been in South Africa for five generations.

With a pastoral vocation from childhood, he holds a Bachelor of Divinity (Honours) from the University of Durban-Westville (1986), a Master of Arts in Missiology and Church History from the University of Durban-Westville (1988) and a Ph.D in Church History and New Testament from the University of Cape Town (2002) focused on social development.

Initially a proposing pastor at McDonald Memorial Presbyterian Church in Amanzimtoti from 1987 to 1989, he then served as pastor at Lotus Park Presbyterian Church in Durban, then at Bridgetown Presbyterian Church in Cape, then at St Andrew's Presbyterian Church in Benoni from 1998 to 2008.

After serving as moderator and then general secretary of the Uniting Presbyterian Church of Southern Africa, a member of the central committee of the South African Council of Churches (SACC), he was elected president of the World Communion of Reformed Churches (WCRC) on 24 June 2010. He is also a member of the Council for World Mission (CWM), an international body based in London.

On 17 June 2022, he was elected general secretary of the World Council of Churches (WCC).

== Published works ==
Pillay is the author of some 30 articles, relating to church history, missiology, or other topics, published mostly between 2015 and 2021.

== Distinctions ==
Pillay holds an honorary doctorate in theology from the University of Debrecen in Hungary.
