= Ecumenical Centre =

Coordinates: 46.2298°N 6.1286°E

The Ecumenical Centre in Geneva, Switzerland, is located in the vicinity of the International Labour Organization, International Red Cross and Red Crescent Movement, and the World Health Organization and serves as the base for the following church organizations:

- ACT Alliance
- Ecumenical Church Loan Fund
- World Student Christian Federation
- World Council of Churches

It formerly also served as the headquarters of:

- Conference of European Churches, now based in Brussels
- Ecumenical News International, now defunct
- World Communion of Reformed Churches, seat since 2014 in Hannover, Germany
- Lutheran World Federation, since 2024 based at Octagon campus near Geneva Airport

== See also ==
- The Interchurch Center, another building complex for multiple religious organizations in New York City
