= Korean Methodist Church and Institute =

Church in Manhattan, New York

Coordinates: 40°48′28.9″N 73°57′56.7″W

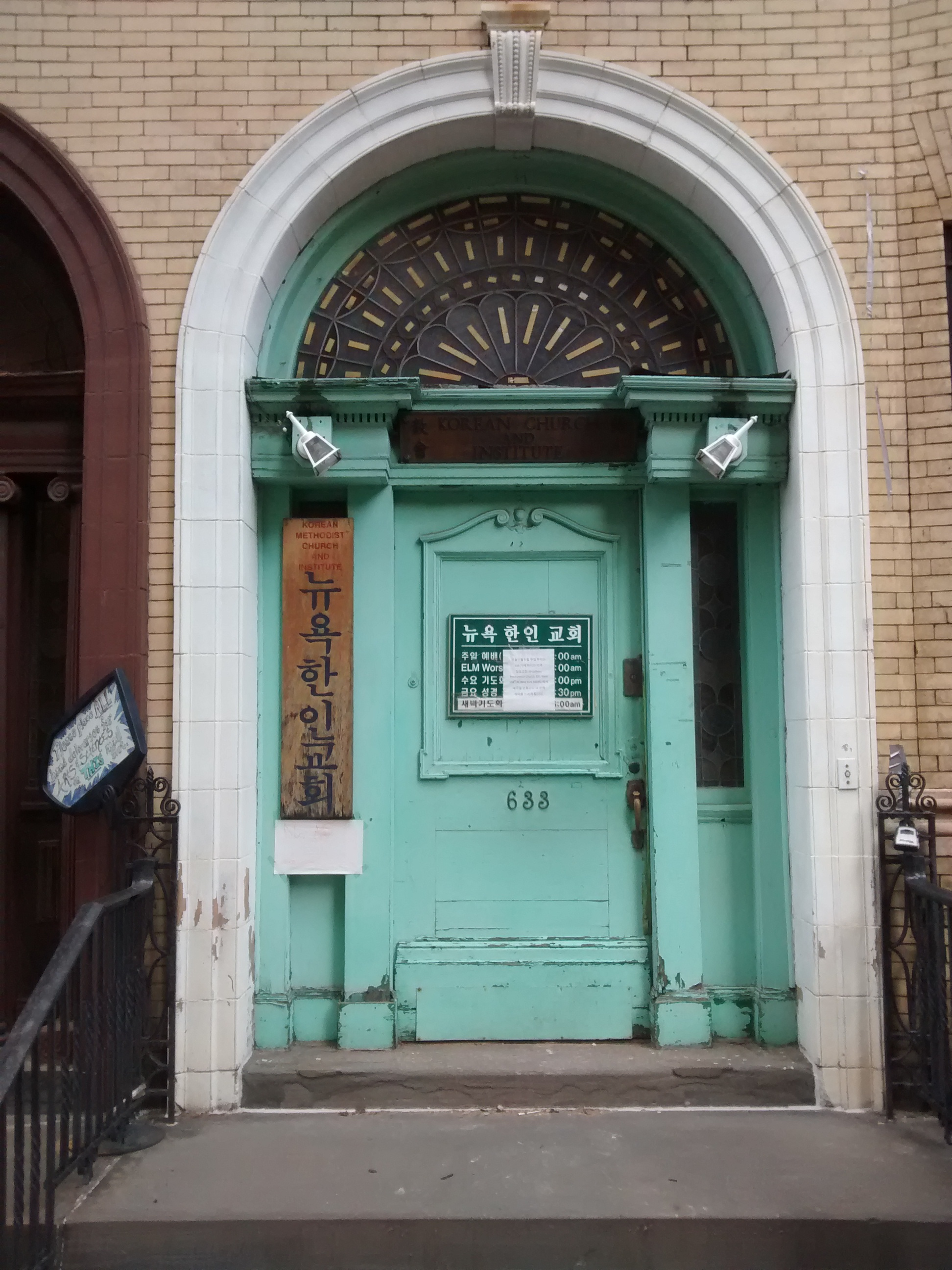
Korean Methodist Church and Institute

Korean Methodist Church and Institute (뉴욕한인교회), also known as KMCI, is a United Methodist Church established in 1921 located in New York City. The church is located at 633 West 115th Street in Manhattan.

In 2025, the pastor is Hyunduk Choi.

== Beginning ==
Korea was annexed by Japan in 1910 and there was a massive independence movement on March 1, 1919, known as the 3.1 movement. Koreans in New York City area gathered to remember and celebrated the 3.1 movement on in 1921 and decided to establish a church. That decision led to the first service at Madison Avenue Methodist Church (1723 Madison Avenue New York, NY). Documents relating to the beginning of the church are scarce, but the church traditionally celebrates April 18, 1921 as the church establishment day.

== History ==
On April 22, 1923 the church moved to its own building on 459 West 21st Street with funds raised by church members and help from the Methodist Church. Then the church moved to the current location in 1927. Both building are four stories high and small (about 25 by 100 feet). It is believed that Morningside Heights was chosen as the permanent church location for the proximity to Columbia University, which had many foreign, especially Korean students. In addition to Columbia, Union Theological Seminary was also a center of theological studies. This location established the church as the intellectual church.

At that time, there were not many Koreans in New York area. In fact, Koreans started coming to the US in 1902 (RMS Gaelic) as farm workers. Later, after the annexation by Japanese, students and independence workers came to the US, especially east coast. Church members had their own business or students, with independence workers stopping by. From the beginning, independence of Korea was an important agenda. The Second World War ended in 1945, and Korean government was established in 1948. Many church members returned to Korea to be part of the new independent republic.

The church fell into hard times with reduced membership but increased student population and some of the students remaining in the US after their study helped maintaining the membership. Republic of Korea goes through the Korean War and dictatorship, and the church is united again for democratization of their homeland. During that time, US immigration policy changes and membership increases from few tens to few hundreds. Luckily, there was a school (St. Hilda's & St. Hugh's School) just across the street. Arrangements were made to hold the Sunday worship service at the school chapel to accommodate the increasing membership. The relationship with the school was not always smooth, and the church holds Sunday worship service at a Broadway Temple (178th Street), and Union Theological Seminary for a while, but returns to the school. Korean Methodist Church & Institute has been the only Korean Church in the New York City area for a long time, but as there were more Koreans with the changing of the US immigration policy in 1970's, more Korean Churches were established. Many church members who had to travel far moved to new churches, Korean Methodist Church & Institute is sometimes known as the “mother church.”

In 1985, the church set up an English-speaking congregation for the children of immigrants; now known as Morningside UMC, it meets at the Union Theological Seminary for worship.

== New building ==
Construction of a new building started in July 2015. The church held the entrance service for the new building on April 18, 2021. Regular in-person Sunday service resumed in May 2022.
