= Baptism, Eucharist and Ministry =

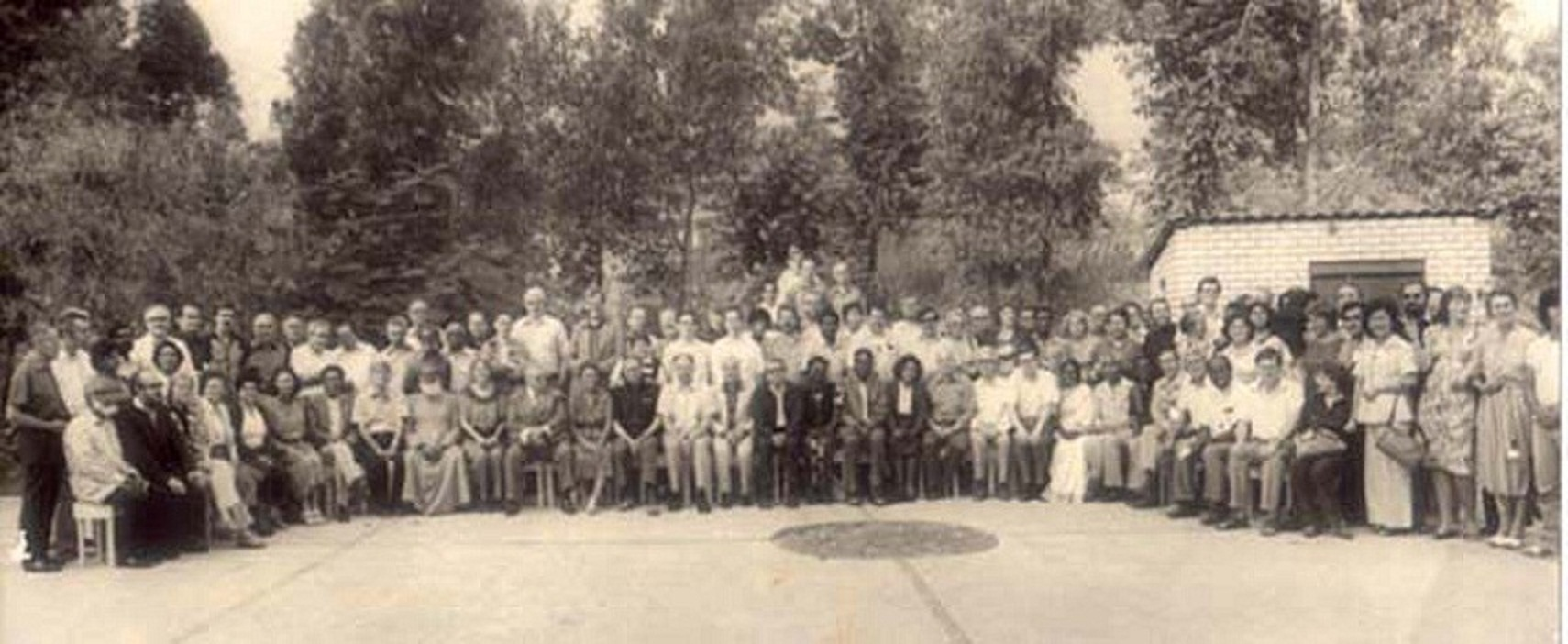
1982 Faith and Order Commission meeting in Lima, Peru

Baptism, Eucharist and Ministry (BEM), also known as the Lima Document, is a Christian ecumenical document adopted by members of the World Council of Churches in Lima in January 1982.

The document attempted to express the convergences that had been found over the years. It was sent to all member churches and six volumes of responses compiled. The approach used in the document has been called ecclesiology of communion by ecumenical theologians, in that the sacraments are presented as a means to achieve greater Church unity.

As a result, some churches have changed their liturgical practices, and some have entered into discussions, which in turn led to further agreements and steps towards unity. For instance, Protestant churches began to mutually recognize the validity of each other's ministers. Similar agreements in sacramental theology have affected Catholic-Orthodox relations and Catholic-Protestant relations, notably the recognition of Trinitarian baptisms.

The question of eucharistic theology is more delicate, given the fact that historic Reformation churches have given no indication that they will recognize the Roman Catholic dogma of transubstantiation, which is essential to the formation of the Catholic priesthood.

== See also ==
- Faith and Order Commission
- Lima Liturgy
