= Faith and Order Commission =

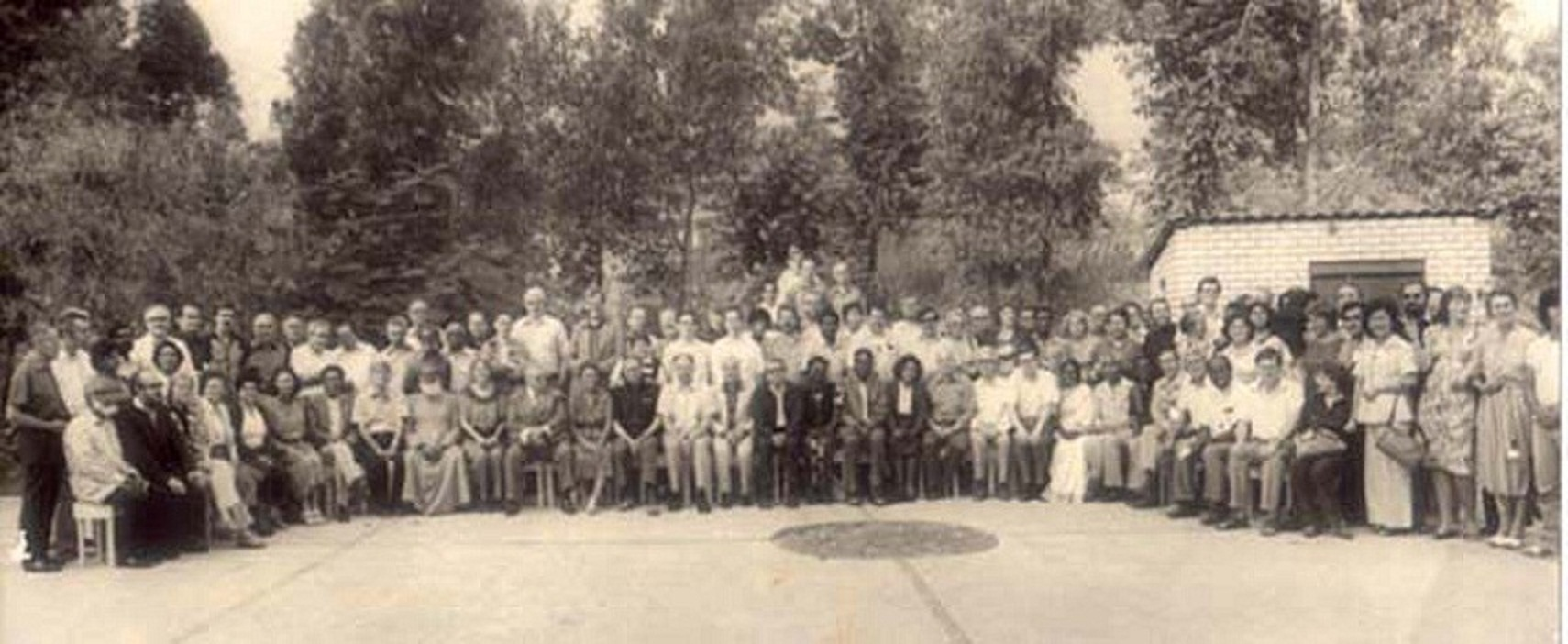
1982 Faith and Order Commission meeting in Lima, Peru

The Faith and Order Commission is an assembly group within the World Council of Churches founded in 1948 which has made numerous and significant contributions to the ecumenical movement.

== Purpose ==
The commission has been successful in working toward consensus on Baptism, Eucharist, and Ministry, on the date of Easter, on the nature and purpose of the church (ecclesiology), and on ecumenical hermeneutics. The 1952 meeting of the Faith and Order Commission, held in Lund, Sweden, produced the Lund Principle for ecumenical co-operation; this was the third of its conferences.

== Members ==
The commission has 120 members, including representation of churches who are not members of the World Council of Churches, among them the Roman Catholic Church, who joined in 1968. Members are men and women from around the world - pastors, laypeople, academics, and church leaders nominated by their churches.

== Works ==
A major study on the church was undertaken which examined the question 'What it means to be a church, or the Church?' in particular with a focus on ecclesiology and ethics focusing on the churches/Church's 'prophetic witness and its service to those in need'.

Faith and Order collaborates with Justice, Peace and Creation to answer the questions:

- 'How can the search for unity be a source of renewal for both the Church and the world?
- 'What does our increasing cooperation on issues of justice, peace and the creation teach us about the nature of the Church?
- 'What is the relationship between ethnicity, nationalism, and church unity?

Material for the Week of Prayer for Christian Unity is prepared annually in collaboration with the Roman Catholic Church.

Other work of the Commission includes facilitating the coordination of results from international bilateral dialogues (the Bilateral Forum), and movements towards local church unions. Its publications are issued in a series of Faith and Order Papers beginning with no. 1 in 1948. An earlier series of Faith and Order Papers was issued by the World Conference of Faith and Order from 1937 onwards.

== See also ==
- Baptism, Eucharist and Ministry
- German Wikipedia entry
