= Ecumenical News International =

Former Christian new service

Ecumenical News International (ENI) was a news agency launched in 1994 as a global news service reporting on ecumenical developments and other news of the Christian churches, and giving religious perspectives on news developments worldwide. The agency was based at the Ecumenical Centre in Geneva, Switzerland, which is also the headquarters of several Protestant and ecumenical organizations.

A shortage of funds led to the suspension of ENI's work in 2012. As of 2024 the work of ENI has remained suspended and the website has been discontinued.
