= John Wesley Lord =

John Wesley Lord (August 23, 1902 – October 8, 1989) was an American bishop of the Methodist Church, elected in 1948. Lord was active in the Civil Rights Movement, he marched with Martin Luther King, he met in the White House with John F. Kennedy, and he pushed for the racial integration of the Methodist Church. He was a vice president of the National Council of Churches and was active in the World Health Organization.

== Early life ==
John was born August 23, 1902, in Paterson, New Jersey, the son of John James Lord of Liverpool and Catherine Steward (Carmichael) Lord of Edinburgh. John Wesley married Margaret Farrington Ratcliffe 29 April 1931. They had one daughter, Jean Phillips. His older brother, Andrew James Lord, was a Founder of Lord Abbett & Company, which remains one of the largest private mutual funds in the U.S. in 2016.

John Wesley was a 1922 graduate of the Montclair State Normal School. He then earned the A.B. degree from Dickinson College, Carlisle, Pennsylvania, in 1927. He also earned the B.D. degree from Drew Theological Seminary in 1930. He did post-graduate work at the University of Edinburgh in Scotland, 1930–31.

== Ministry ==
John Wesley Lord was received on-trial in the Newark Annual Conference of the Methodist Episcopal Church and ordained Deacon, April 1929. He was received into full connection and ordained Elder, March 1931. The Rev. Lord served the following appointments: Assistant Pastor, Emory Methodist Church, Jersey City, New Jersey (1927–30); Pastor, Union, New Jersey Community Church (1931–34); First Church, Arlington (1935–37); and First Methodist Church, Westfield (1938–48).

The Rev. John Wesley Lord was elected to the episcopacy of the Methodist Church by the Northeastern Jurisdictional Conference in 1948. He was assigned as the Resident Bishop of the Boston episcopal area.

Bishop Lord retired in 1972, and died on October 8, 1989.

== See also ==
- List of bishops of the United Methodist Church
