= General Board (disambiguation) =

The General Board (in full, the General Board of the United States Navy) was an advisory body to the U.S. Navy between 1900 and 1951.

General Board may also refer to:

- General Board of Health, nineteenth-century UK local government body
- General board (Dutch water boards), Netherlands water administrative body
- General Board of the Y.M.M.I.A., youth administrative body within the Church of Jesus Christ of Latter-day Saints
- Within the United Methodist Church:
  - General Board of Church and Society
  - General Board of Discipleship
  - General Board of Pension and Health Benefits

== See also ==
- Board of directors
