= Liberation Methodist Connexion =

American Protestant denomination

- LMX wordmark
- Abbreviation: LMX
- Classification: Protestant
- Orientation: Methodist
- Theology: Liberationist · Wesleyan
- Polity: Connectionalism
- Founder: Liberationist members within the UMC
- Origin: November 29, 2020
- Separated from: United Methodist Church
- Official website: thelmx.org

The Liberation Methodist Connexion (shortened to LMX) is an aspiring Protestant denomination based in the United States drawing from Methodism and liberation theology. Formed in 2020 as a progressive offshoot of the United Methodist Church, the LMX includes Methodists and non-Methodists alike and encourages continued collaboration with the UMC. Organizers of the Liberation Methodist Connexion announced on 18 December 2021 that no progress has been made to set up a separate denomination.

== Name ==
Liberation Methodist Connexion is named for the liberation theology movement that originated with Catholic theologians in Latin America during the 1960s. The spelling of "connexion" is drawn from an old British spelling of the word used by John Wesley, the founder of Methodism.

== History ==
At the 2019 special session of the United Methodist Church General Conference, delegates voted 438-384 in favor of a Traditional Plan that would reaffirm the language in the UMC's Book of Discipline banning the ordination of LGBT clergy members and preventing clergy from performing same-sex marriages. Several progressives within the UMC began proposing a new denomination in response to this decision. Members of this progressive coalition referred to themselves as the "Liberationists" and discussed the possibility of a new denomination in the months following the General Conference.

In January 2020, the UMC proposed the "Protocol of Grace and Separation" that would allow churches with traditional views towards LGBT issues to form a new Methodist denomination and provide the "post-separation" UMC to rescind the Traditional Plan. A vote on the Protocol, set for the May 2020 General Conference, was postponed until 2022.

Members of the "Liberationist" coalition opted to advance their plan to form a new denomination rather than wait for the UMC to settle its stance on LGBT issues. The Liberation Methodist Connexion was formally announced on November 29, 2020. In December 2021, the organization published a press release detailing initial struggles within the LMX and outlining the denomination's statement of values and mission statement.

== Beliefs ==
According to the Liberationist Methodist Connexion website, the denomination's doctrine is not "set in stone". In a presentation given announcing the LMX's founding, collaborators indicated that "correct action" will be prioritized over "correct doctrine".

== See also ==
- Christianity and homosexuality
- United Methodist Church
- Global Methodist Church
- Reconciling Ministries Network
- Religion and LGBT people
