= Cynthia Fierro Harvey =

American Methodist bishop (born 1959)

Bishop Cynthia Fierro Harvey
- Resident Bishop, Texas Annual Conference
- Church: United Methodist Church
- Diocese: Texas Annual Conference
- In office: September 1, 2012 – present
- Predecessor: Bishop Scott Jones
- Successor: Incumbent
- Previous posts: Resident Bishop, Louisiana Annual Conference

Orders
- Consecration: 2012

Personal details
- Born: 1959 (age 66–67) Big Spring, Texas
- Spouse: Dean Alan Harvey

Cynthia Fierro Harvey (born 1959) is an American bishop in the United Methodist Church and served as president of its Council of Bishops. She is the first Hispanic woman to lead the Council of Bishops. Harvey is the Resident Bishop of the Texas Annual Conference (Houston Based actually 1 of 4 Annual Conferences based in Texas).

== Early life ==
Cynthia Fierro was born in 1959 in Big Spring, Texas. Raised in an Hispanic Catholic family, she grew up in a home built by her father and grandfather. She was a cheerleader in high school, and active in sports. She attended college at the University of Texas at Austin, graduating in 1980 with a degree in journalism.

While in college, she began attending worship at a local United Methodist church, and later became a member of the United Methodist Church. After graduating from college, Harvey worked in marketing for twelve years, before deciding to enter the ministry. She attended the Perkins School of Theology, where she completed her Master of Divinity degree in 1999.

== Ordained ministry ==
After completing seminary, Harvey was ordained, and served as associate pastor of the Foundry United Methodist Church, in Houston, Texas, from 1992 to 1996. According to Harvey, she was attending worship at Foundry UMC when she received her call to ministry. Her second appointment was as executive associate pastor of Memorial Drive UMC, also in Houston, where she served from 1996 to 2008. When Hurricane Katrina hit the Gulf Coast in 2005, Harvey organized Memorial Drive Church's outreach efforts to help people who had fled from Louisiana amid the storm's devastation.

By 2009, Harvey was serving as director of missional excellence for the Texas Conference, United Methodist Church. She was then appointed as deputy general secretary of the United Methodist Committee on Relief (UMCOR), a position she held for two years, from 2010 to 2012.

At the 2012 quadrennial meeting of the South Central Jurisdiction, Harvey was elected bishop on the fifth ballot, becoming the first woman in sixteen years to be elected bishop in that region. She was appointed to the Louisiana Conference, succeeding Bishop William W. Hutchinson, and began her first four-year term on September 1, 2012. She was re-appointed for another four-year term in 2016. She served as a board member for the Louisiana United Methodist Children and Family Services, beginning in 2012.

All bishops in the United Methodist Church are members of the Council of Bishops, which has oversight of the denomination, and promotes "temporal and spiritual interests of the entire Church." In 2014, Harvey was elected as the secretary of the Council of Bishops. After her four-year term as secretary, she was elected president designate of the Council of Bishops, serving for two years, from May 2018 to May 2020.

In November 2019, Harvey was elevated to president of the Council of Bishops, becoming the first Hispanic woman and first woman of color elected to this post. The first woman president of the Council of Bishops in the UMC was Bishop Sharon Brown Christopher, who held the post from 2002 to 2003. The first Hispanic president of the council was Bishop Elias Gabriel Galvan.

Harvey's term officially began in May 2020, and will last two years. She succeeded Bishop Kenneth H. Carter Jr., who became immediate past-president of the council. In the United Methodist Church, the president of the Council of Bishops is responsible for overseeing the meetings of the council, and often speaks publicly about current issues in the church. Yet, she does not speak on behalf of all the churches within the denomination.

== UMC debates and church division ==
Ongoing disagreements about homosexuality and the inclusion of LGBTQ Christians in the life of the church (including ordination and marriage rites) have caused considerable tension over the past few years within the denomination, which includes both liberal and conservative churches. Harvey has been supportive of allowing UMC clergy to perform same-sex marriage, and also supportive of the ordination of LGBTQ ministers in the denomination. Both are currently not allowed under the rules of the UMC Book of Discipline. She was a proponent of the One Church plan that would have allowed individual congregations to make decisions about performing weddings, and allow local Conferences to determine if candidates can be ordained.

In April 2019, at the UMC General Conference held in St. Louis, Harvey, as president designate, presided over the vote on the One Church plan. It was voted down in favor of a proposal to retain the current restrictions, called the Traditional Plan. Support for the Traditional plan was high among conservative congregations, especially in Africa where the denomination is rapidly growing.

In 2019, Harvey participated in discussions with fifteen other UMC leaders from across the globe, including both liberals and conservatives, about a possible division within the United Methodist Church. The meetings were facilitated by mediator Kenneth Feinberg. The group decided to meet in the aftermath of the 2019 defeat of the One Church plan, which revealed the depth of the divisions on this issue. Harvey was quoted as saying that the denomination had "tried to look for ways that we could gracefully live together with all our differences" but that after the 2019 debates and vote, "it just didn’t look like that was even possible anymore.” Harvey was one of the signatories for the proposal which was issued by the group in early 2020, which would allow for the establishment of a new denomination which would be theologically conservative in nature. Individual congregations could join this denomination and formally separate from the UMC. The plan will be discussed and voted on at the next General Conference. Due to the coronavirus pandemic, the planned 2020 General Conference was postponed.

== Personal life ==
Harvey is married to Dean Alan Harvey, and they have one daughter.

== Awards ==
- Perkins School of Theology Distinguished Alumna (2018)
