= United Methodist Church =

Mainline Protestant denomination

- The United Methodist Church "cross and flame" emblem
- Abbreviation: UMC
- Classification: Mainline Protestant
- Orientation: Methodist
- Scripture: Protestant Bible
- Theology: Wesleyan
- Polity: Connexional
- President: Ruben Saenz, Jr.
- Secretary: L. J. Holston
- Full communion: PCS (since 1922); EKD (since 1987); ELCA (since 2009); AME (since 2012); AMEZ (since 2012); CMEC (since 2012); AUMPC (since 2012); UAMEC (since 2012); Moravians (since 2018)
- Annual conferences: 132
- Episcopal areas: 66
- Associations: World Council of Churches; Churches Uniting in Christ; Christian Churches Together; National Council of Churches; Wesleyan Holiness Consortium; Christian Holiness Partnership; World Methodist Council
- Founder: John Wesley (spiritually)
- Origin: 1968
- Merger of: The Methodist Church and the Evangelical United Brethren Church
- Separations: New Methodist Conference (2005); Ang Iglesia Metodista sa Pilipinas (2011); Global Methodist Church (2022) The Foundry Network (2022) Methodist Collegiate Church (2023)
- Congregations: 39,460 (29,746 in the US)
- Members: 11,299,000 worldwide (4,788,023 total members in US, 3,809,543 professing members in the US)
- Ministers: 83,800
- Aid organization: United Methodist Committee on Relief
- Secondary schools: 10
- Tertiary institutions: 109
- Official website: umc.org

The United Methodist Church (UMC) is a worldwide Mainline Protestant Christian denomination based in Africa, the Philippines, Europe, and the United States claiming 11.3 million members, and is a major part of Methodism. In the 19th century, its main predecessor, the Methodist Episcopal Church, was a leader in evangelicalism. The present denomination was founded in 1968 in Dallas by union of the Methodist Church and the Evangelical United Brethren Church, and is shaped by the voluntary separation of 25% of the United States churches leading up to the delayed 2020 General Conference held in 2024. The UMC traces its roots back to the revival movement of John and Charles Wesley in England, as well as the Great Awakening in the United States. As such, the church's theological orientation is decidedly Wesleyan. It embraces liturgical worship, holiness, and evangelical elements. According to its Book of Discipline, "The mission of the Church is to make disciples of Jesus Christ for the transformation of the world."

The United Methodist Church has a connectional polity, a typical feature of a number of Methodist denominations. It is organized into conferences. The highest level is called the General Conference and is the only organization which may speak officially for the UMC. The church is a member of the World Council of Churches, the World Methodist Council, and other religious associations.

Between 1968 and 2025, the UMC's professing membership has declined from 11 million to 3,809,543 members and 29,746 churches in the United States. As of 2022, it had 9,984,925 members and 39,460 churches worldwide. In 2025, the Pew Research Center estimated that 3 percent of the U.S. population, or approximately 8 million adult adherents, identified with the United Methodist Church, revealing a larger number of adherents than registered members.

On January 3, 2020, a group of Methodist leaders proposed a plan to split the United Methodist Church over issues of sexual orientation (particularly ordination of clergy in same-sex marriage) and create a new traditionalist Methodist denomination; the Global Methodist Church was formed in 2022. As of December 30, 2023, the number of UMC churches in the United States that were approved for disaffiliation stood at 7,660. This figure represented approximately one-quarter of the UMC churches in the United States. In May 2024, the United Methodist Church General Conference repealed bans on LGBTQ clergy and same-sex marriage.

In November 2025, the United Methodist Church ratified Worldwide Regionalization, a series of Constitutional Amendments passed at the 2024 General Conference to restructure the UMC designed to give equal autonomy to various regions of the church, renaming former Central (non-US) Conferences to Regional Conferences and the creation of a U.S. Regional Conference on an equal basis, which many United Methodists believe would help decolonize the church and aid global unity.

== History ==
=== Church origins ===
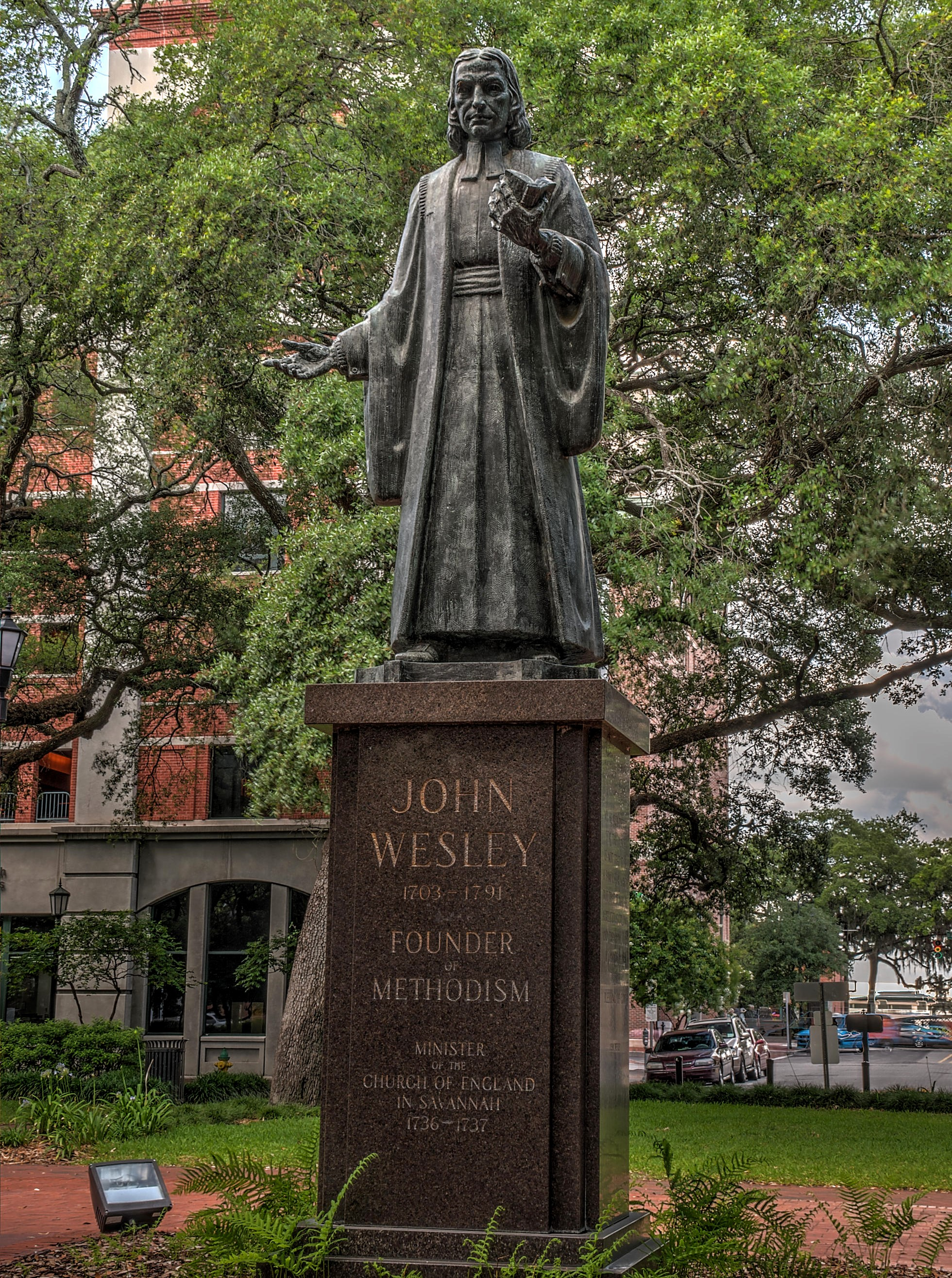
Statue of John Wesley in Savannah, Georgia, where he served as a missionary

The movement which would become the United Methodist Church began in the mid-18th century within the Church of England. A small group of students, including John Wesley, Charles Wesley, and George Whitefield, met at Oxford University. They focused on Bible study, methodical study of scripture, and living a holy life. Other students mocked them, saying they were the "Holy Club" and "the Methodists", being methodical and exceptionally detailed in their Bible study, opinions, and disciplined lifestyle. Eventually, the so-called Methodists started individual societies or classes for members of the Church of England who wanted to live a more religious life.

In 1735, John and Charles Wesley went to America, hoping to teach the gospel to the Native Americans in the colony of Georgia. Instead, John became vicar of Christ Church in Savannah. His preaching was legalistic and full of harsh rules, and the congregation rejected him. After two years in America, he returned to England dejected and confused. While sailing on his original journey to America, he had been impressed with the faith of the German Moravians on board, and when he returned to England he spent time with Peter Böhler, a German Moravian who was passing through England and who believed that a person is saved solely through the grace of God and not by works. John had many conversations with Böhler about this topic. On May 25, 1738, after listening to a reading of Martin Luther's preface to the Epistle to the Romans, John came to the understanding that his good works could not save him and he could rest in God's grace for salvation. For the first time in his life, he felt peace and the assurance of salvation.

In less than two years, the "Holy Club" disbanded. John Wesley met with a group of clergy, and afterwards said "they appeared to be of one heart, as well as of one judgment, resolved to be Bible-Christians at all events; and, wherever they were, to preach with all their might plain, old, Bible Christianity." The ministers nonetheless retained their membership in the Church of England. Though not always emphasized or appreciated in the Anglican churches of their day, their teaching emphasized salvation by God's grace, acquired through faith in Christ. Three teachings they saw as the foundation of Christian faith were:

1. People are all by nature dead in sin and, consequently, children of wrath.
2. They are justified by faith alone.
3. Faith produces inward and outward holiness.

These clergymen quickly became popular, attracting large congregations. The nickname students had used against the Wesleys was revived; they and their followers subsequently became known as Methodists.

=== Predecessors ===
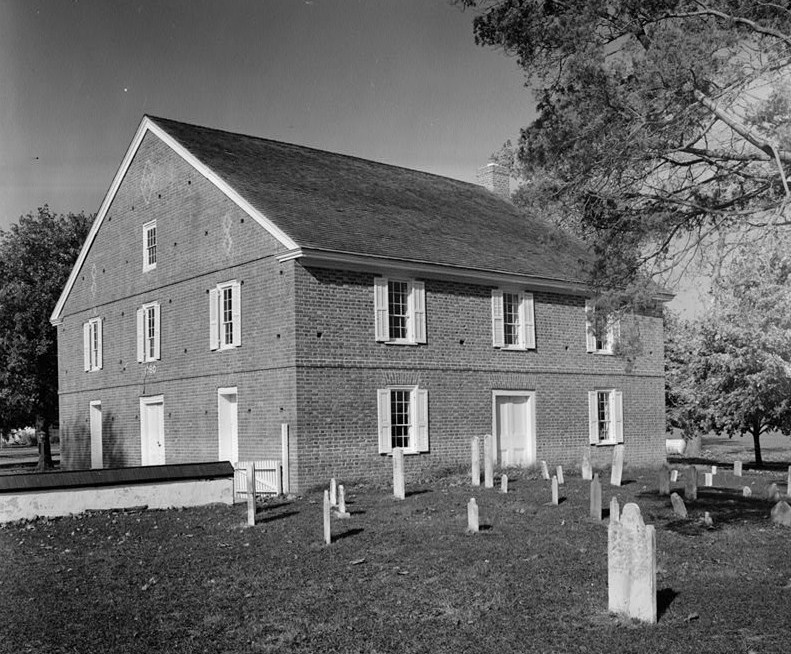
Barratt's Chapel, built in 1780, is the oldest Methodist church in the United States built for that purpose. The church was a meeting place of Asbury and Coke.

The English preacher Francis Asbury arrived in America in 1771. He became a "circuit rider", taking the gospel to the furthest reaches of the new frontier as he had done as a preacher in England . The first official organization in the United States occurred in Baltimore, Maryland, in 1784, with the formation of the Methodist Episcopal Church at the Christmas Conference with Francis Asbury and Thomas Coke as the leaders.

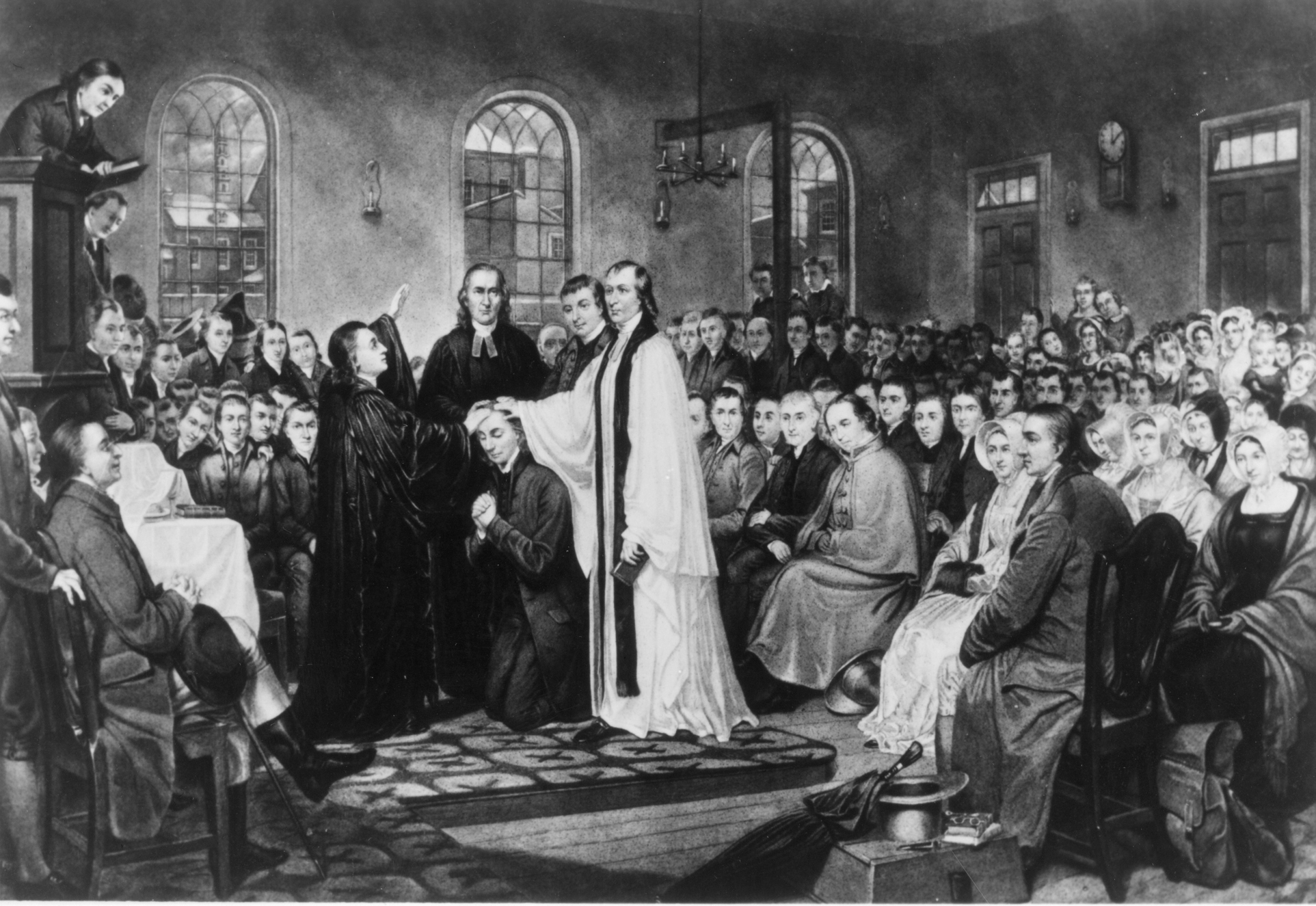
The ordination of Bishop Francis Asbury by Bishop Thomas Coke at the Christmas Conference establishing the Methodist Episcopal Church, 1784

Though John Wesley originally wanted the Methodists to stay within the Church of England, the American Revolution decisively separated the Methodists in the American colonies from the life and sacraments of the English Church. In 1784, after unsuccessful attempts to have the Church of England send a bishop to start a new church in the colonies, Wesley decisively appointed fellow priest Thomas Coke as Superintendent (the equivalent of a bishop) to organize a separate Methodist Society. Together with Coke, Wesley sent The Sunday Service of the Methodists, Methodism's first liturgical text and the Articles of Religion, which were received and adopted by the Baltimore Christmas Conference of 1784, officially establishing the Methodist Episcopal Church. The conference was held at the Lovely Lane Methodist Church, considered the mother church of American Methodism.

The new church grew rapidly in the young country as it employed circuit riders, many of whom were laymen, to travel the mostly rural nation by horseback to preach the Gospel and to establish churches until there was scarcely any village in the United States without a Methodist presence. With 4,000 circuit riders by 1844, the Methodist Episcopal Church rapidly became the largest Protestant denomination in the country.

St. George's United Methodist Church, located at the corner of 4th and New Streets, in the Old City neighborhood of Philadelphia, is the oldest Methodist church in continuous use in the United States, beginning in 1769. The congregation was founded in 1767, meeting initially in a sail loft on Dock Street, and in 1769 it purchased the shell of a building which had been erected in 1763 by a German Reformed congregation. At this time, Methodists had not yet broken away from the Anglican Church and the Methodist Episcopal Church was not founded until 1784.

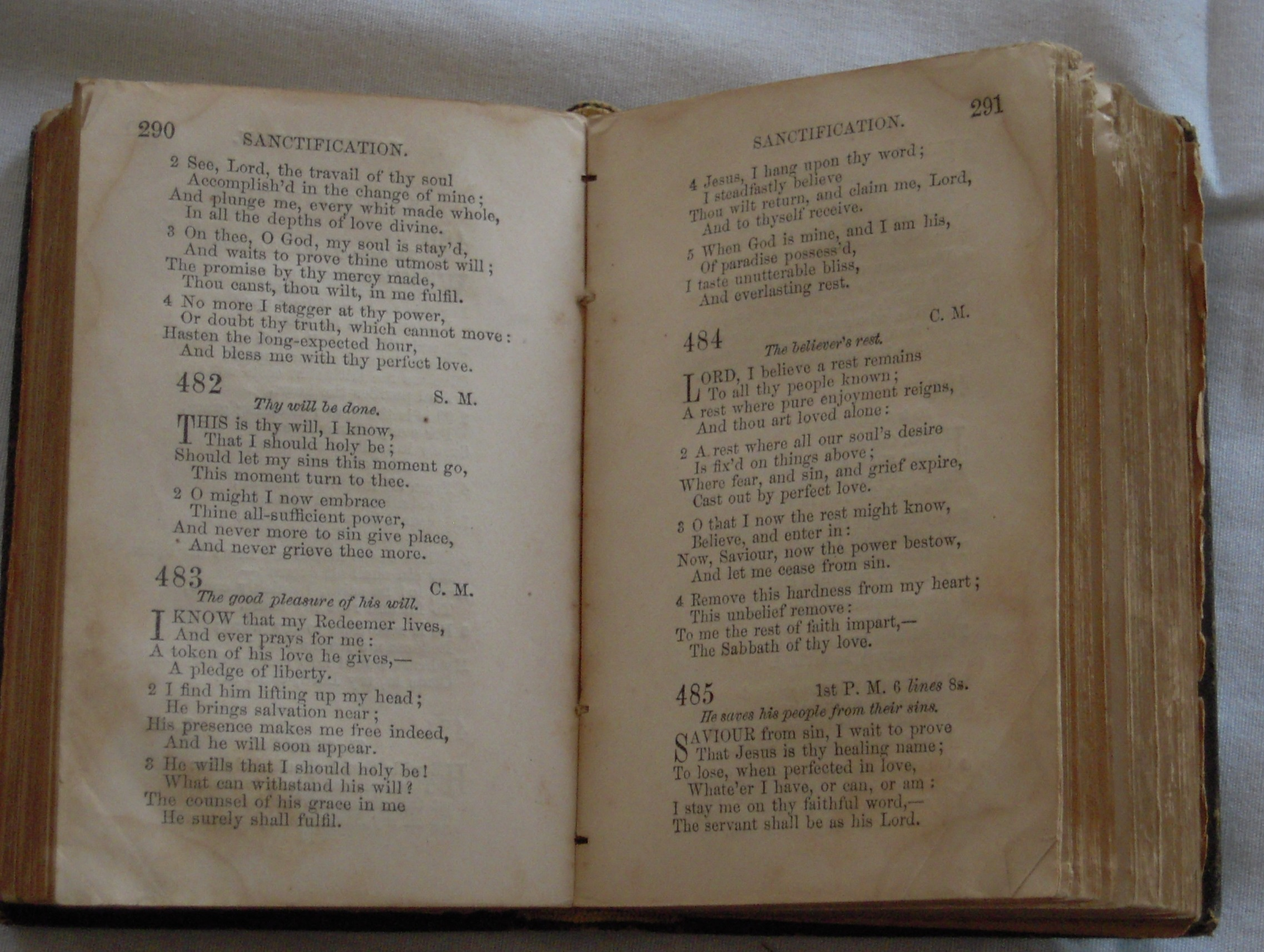
19th-century Methodist hymnal, Barratt's Chapel

Richard Allen and Absalom Jones became the first African Americans ordained by the Methodist Church. They were licensed by Saint George's Church in 1784. Three years later, protesting racial segregation in worship services, Allen led most of the black members out of St. George's; eventually they founded the Mother Bethel A.M.E. Church and the African Methodist Episcopal Church. Absalom Jones became an Episcopal priest. In 1836, the church's basement was excavated to make room for a Sunday school. In the 1920s, a court case saved the church from being demolished to make way for the Benjamin Franklin Bridge. The case resulted in the bridge being relocated. Historic Saint George's welcomes visitors and is home to archives and a museum on Methodism.

In the more than 220 years since 1784, Methodism in the United States, like many other Protestant denominations, has seen a number of divisions and mergers. In 1830, the Methodist Protestant Church split from the Methodist Episcopal Church over the issue of laity having a voice and vote in the administration of the church, insisting that clergy should not be the only ones to have any determination in how the church was to be operated. In 1844, the General Conference of the Methodist Episcopal Church split into two conferences because of tensions over slavery and the power of bishops in the denomination.

The two general conferences, Methodist Episcopal Church (the northern faction) and Methodist Episcopal Church, South remained separate until 1939. That year, the northern and southern Methodist Episcopal Churches and the majority of the Methodist Protestant Church merged to create The Methodist Church. The uniting conference took place at First Methodist Church (now First United Methodist Church) of Marion, Indiana.

=== 1939 merger and the Central Jurisdiction in the Methodist Church ===
In 1844, the Methodist Episcopal Church (South) split from the Methodist Episcopal Church over slavery despite that John Wesley was against slavery. In 1939, the Methodist Episcopal Church, the Methodist Episcopal Church (South) and the Methodist Protestant Church merged to form the Methodist Church. The 1939 merger was created at the expense of African Americans. At the behest of the southern faction, the Central Jurisdiction was created as a compromise which segregated the Methodist Church. There were five administrative jurisdictions in the US that were on the basis of geography, but a sixth jurisdiction, the segregated Central Jurisdiction was exclusively for African American churches, conferences, and pastors. The Central Jurisdiction lasted from 1939 to 1968 but it took until 1972 for all conferences to be integrated. The 1968 merger with the Evangelical United Brethren church had a condition for merger, which was the abolition of the Central Jurisdiction. The merger created the United Methodist Church. In the wake of the Central Jurisdiction’s abolition, the organization Black Methodists for Church Renewal and the agency the General Commission on Religion and Race were created to work for an end to racism in the church and society and to advocate for Black United Methodists.

In the 1950s, members of the Methodist Student Movement (MSM) created radical groups on Southern college campuses, organizing for civil rights. These student organizers would go on to contribute to other civil rights, anti-colonial, and feminist groups off campus. Mary King and Casey Hayden, two women influenced by the MSM, would go on to publish "Sex and Caste: A Kind of Memo," a critique of sexism within the Student Nonviolent Coordinating Committee.

=== 1968 merger and formation of the UMC ===
On April 23, 1968, the United Methodist Church was created when the Evangelical United Brethren Church (represented by Bishop Reuben H. Mueller) and The Methodist Church (represented by Bishop Lloyd Christ Wicke) joined hands at the constituting General Conference in Dallas, Texas. With the words, "Lord of the Church, we are united in Thee, in Thy Church and now in The United Methodist Church" the new denomination was given birth by both churches which had distinguished histories and influential ministries in various parts of the world.

=== 2020–2024 schisms ===
Prior to the United Methodist Church's May 2024 General Conference, the UMC had rules, found in the Book of Discipline, that prohibited same-sex unions and the ordination of noncelibate homosexuals. Many progressive UMC leaders and churches, especially in the United States, are supportive of gay marriage and ignored the injunctions in the Book of Discipline. Many conservative members of the UMC did not like the trend of the UMC towards endorsing gay marriage and, hence, have initiated movements to split-off from the UMC.

On January 3, 2020, the denomination's leadership released a proposal to split the Church over what it described as "fundamental differences" over homosexuality, particularly same-sex marriage (see § Homosexuality below). The United Methodist Church would hold a special session to repeal the ban on same-sex marriage. The proposal would need to be approved by the General Conference in order to take effect. The 2020 General Conference, originally scheduled to be held in Minneapolis, Minnesota, was postponed due to the COVID-19 pandemic.

In November 2020, a small group of the progressive wing announced their intention to create a new denomination, the Liberation Methodist Connexion. It was launched on the First Sunday in Advent through an online service. However, organizers of the Liberation Methodist Connexion announced on 18 December 2021 that no progress had been made to set up a separate denomination.

In March 2021, conservative leaders of the UMC unveiled the name Global Methodist Church for the new traditionalist denomination, along with a new website and logo. The next General Conference was set for 2024. At that time, delegates were expected to vote on the Protocol for Reconciliation and Grace through Separation. The conservative Transitional Leadership Council said the Global Methodist Church would be officially started, with individual churches or conferences able to join, when the General Conference adopted legislation implementing the Protocol, although the Council intended to "consider bringing the new church into existence without delay" "if it becomes apparent" that leaders "who covenanted to support the Protocol no longer do so." Not wanting to wait for the General Conference to occur, some conservative United Methodist congregations left the United Methodist Church to become a part of the Free Methodist Church, a traditionalist Methodist denomination aligned with the holiness movement. After the launch of the Global Methodist Church on May 1, 2022, a number of traditionalist United Methodist churches entered into the Global Methodist Church. Other former United Methodist churches that disaffiliated joined various Methodist denominations, such as the Congregational Methodist Church and Methodist Protestant Church, or became members of the Association of Independent Methodists.

On May 10, 2022, the Judicial Council of the United Methodist Church ruled that annual UMC conferences in the United States cannot leave the church for the Global Methodist Church; only individual churches may do so. The Romania-Bulgaria Conference has left the UMC. As of May 2022, the South Georgia and Northwest Texas conferences were making preparations to leave the UMC; however, these proposed transitions would require UMC General conference legislation.

Early in 2022, according to the United Methodist News Service, the United Methodist Church approved 300 requests by individual churches to leave the denomination. The Wesleyan Covenant Association, which was helping congregations join the Global Methodist Church, said that 1,000 more churches were expected to hold votes on proposed departures from the UMC later in the year and that 300 of 800 Western Pennsylvania Annual Conference churches were considering leaving. Methodist churches and congregations in Slovakia, Bulgaria, Croatia or Romania also expressed dissent and intentions to disaffiliate from the UMC due to progressive tendencies in the American leadership of the UMC. Over 100 churches in Florida and North Carolina had filed or were considering lawsuits. Some of the largest churches in Arkansas, Georgia, Louisiana, Missouri, Oklahoma and Texas were planning to leave. As of 2022, any church that disaffiliated would be responsible for paying two years of apportionments and unfunded pension liabilities. Fifty-eight churches belonging to the Louisiana Annual Conference left the United Methodist Church, with seven congregations being from Baton Rouge and six from New Orleans. The disaffiliations from the conference were scheduled to take effect after December 31, 2022. St. Timothy, one of the largest Methodist churches in Louisiana, voted for disaffiliation on November 1, 2022. To prevent certain congregations from disaffiliating, the UMC ordered that certain churches be closed before disaffiliation votes could occur. Several annual conferences designated certain remaining congregations as "lighthouse congregations", which offer support to UMC parishioners who objected to their former congregations' disaffiliation.

As of December 30, 2023, the number of UMC churches in the United States that were approved for disaffiliation stood at 7,660. This figure represented approximately one-quarter of the UMC churches in the United States.

The 2024 General Conference, the first since the delayed 2020 conference ran from April 23 to May 3 in Charlotte, North Carolina. With no debate since many of the more conservative congregations had left, proposals approved included having separate regions outside the United States in order to allow each region to have its own policies, removing language stating "the practice of homosexuality is incompatible with Christian teaching", and ending bans on same-sex weddings and gay clergy.

On May 28, 2024, the Côte d’Ivoire Conference voted to leave the UMC in response to the General Conference decision to allow same-sex marriages and gay clergy. With 1.2 million members, the Côte d’Ivoire Conference was the UMC's largest single presence outside the United States.

From 2024 to 2025, violence occurred in Nigeria between United Methodists and Global Methodists. 3 United Methodists were killed, and several buildings were damaged.

=== 2025-present: Worldwide Regionalization ===
At the May 2024 General Conference, delegates approved a Constitutional Amendment called Worldwide Regionalization that would give Regions of the church around the world equal autonomy to adapt the Book of Discipline, create a regional hymnal, and set policies on membership, ordination, and marriage within different cultural contexts, missional needs, and legal contexts around the world. Over the course of a year and a half, Annual Conference (local) delegates around the world voted on whether to ratify the amendments. The amendments were officially and overwhelmingly ratified in November 2025. What were Central Conferences have been renamed Regional Conferences and a US Regional Conference is created by the amendments. Before regionalization, the US was unable to make adaptations to the Discipline, unlike other places in the church and any such efforts by the US required action to be taken at General Conference, a worldwide body, instead of locally. There are four Regional Conferences in Africa, three in Europe, one in the Philippines, and there will be one in the United States. Advocates for Regionalization deemed the restructuring necessary to decolonize the church and to advance church unity.

== Beliefs ==
The United Methodist Church seeks to create disciples for Christ through outreach, evangelism, and through seeking holiness, also called sanctification, by the power of the Holy Spirit. The flame in the church logo represents the work of the Holy Spirit in the world, and the two parts of the flame also represent the predecessor denominations, the Methodist Church and the Evangelical United Brethren, united at the base symbolizing the 1968 merger.

The United Methodist Church understands itself to be part of the holy catholic (or universal) church and it recognizes the historic ecumenical creeds, the Apostles' Creed and the Nicene Creed; which are used frequently in services of worship. The Book of Discipline also recognizes the importance of the Chalcedonian Creed of the Council of Chalcedon. It upholds the concept of the "visible and invisible Church," meaning that all who are truly believers in every age belong to the holy Church invisible, while the United Methodist Church is a branch of the Church visible, to which all believers must be connected as it is the only institution wherein the Word of God is preached and the Sacraments are administered.

Some argue that the United Methodist Church can lay a claim to apostolic succession, as understood in the traditional sense. As a result of the American Revolution, John Wesley was compelled in 1784 to break with standard practice and ordain two of his lay preachers as presbyters, Thomas Vasey and Richard Whatcoat. Thomas Coke, already an Anglican priest, assisted Wesley in this action. Coke was then "set apart" as a Superintendent (bishop) by Wesley and dispatched with Vasey and Whatcoat to America to take charge of Methodist activities there. In defense of his action to ordain, Wesley himself cited an ancient opinion from the Church of Alexandria, which held that bishops and presbyters constituted one order and therefore, bishops are to be elected from and by the presbyterate. He knew that for two centuries the succession of bishops in the Church of Alexandria was preserved through ordination by presbyters alone and was considered valid by the Early Church. Methodists today who would argue for apostolic succession would do so on these grounds.

Although United Methodist practices and interpretation of beliefs have evolved over time, these practices and beliefs can be traced to the writings of the church's founders, especially John Wesley and Charles Wesley (Anglicans), but also Philip William Otterbein and Martin Boehm (United Brethren), and Jacob Albright (Evangelical Association). With the formation of the United Methodist Church in 1968, theologian Albert C. Outler led the team which systematized denominational doctrine. Outler's work proved pivotal in the work of union, and he is largely considered the first United Methodist theologian.

=== Doctrine ===
The officially established Doctrinal Standards of United Methodism are:

- The Articles of Religion of the Methodist Church;
- The Confessions of Faith of the Evangelical United Brethren Church;
- The General Rules of the Methodist Societies;
- The Standard Sermons of John Wesley;
- John Wesley's Explanatory Notes on the New Testament.

These Doctrinal Standards are constitutionally protected and nearly impossible to change or remove. Other doctrines of the United Methodist Church are found in the Book of Discipline of the United Methodist Church.

=== Summary of basic beliefs ===
The basic beliefs of the United Methodist Church include:

- Triune God. God is one God in three persons: Father, Son and Holy Spirit.
- The Bible. The Bible is the inspired word of God. F. Belton Joyner argues that there is a deep division within Methodism today about what exactly this means. Questions include whether the Bible was inspired when written (and the text today is always true and without error), or if it is inspired when actually read by a Christian (and therefore dependent on the interaction with the reader.) In the first case, says Joyner, the Christian is concerned only with the precise wording of the original manuscript, without regard to historical setting. In the other case, the reader tries to read the biblical text in terms of all of the influences of modern thought, with little regard for the meaning offered in the ancient texts. In that Wesleyan tradition, United Methodists balance these two extremes, aware that the same Holy Spirit who inspired the Scriptures is alive and well to bring the written Word alive for the present. United Methodists take seriously both the original inspiration and today's contemporary inspiration. "...In this way, the Bible itself becomes the balancing, clarifying, even correcting tool for understanding the Scripture. God's gifts in the written Word are so rich that they can continue to give light and life as one digs again and again into the same Scriptures."
- Sin. While human beings were intended to bear the image of God, all humans are sinners for whom that image is distorted. Sin estranges people from God and corrupts human nature such that we cannot heal or save ourselves.
- Salvation through Jesus Christ. God's redeeming love is active to save sinners through Jesus' incarnate life and teachings, through his atoning death, his resurrection, his sovereign presence through history, and his promised return.
- Sanctification. The grace of sanctification draws one toward the gift of Christian perfection, which Wesley described as a heart "habitually filled with the love of God and neighbor" and as "having the mind of Christ and walking as he walked." This emphasis in Methodism has led to the heralding of the motto "Holiness unto the Lord".
- Sacraments. United Methodists recognize two sacraments: Holy Baptism and Holy Communion. Other rites such as Confirmation, Ordination, Holy Matrimony, Funerals, and Anointing of the Sick are performed but not considered sacraments. In Holy Baptism, the Church believes that "Baptism is not only a sign of profession and mark of difference whereby Christians are distinguished from others that are not baptized; but it is also a sign of regeneration or the new birth. It believes that Baptism is a sacrament in which God initiates a covenant with individuals, people become a part of the Church, is not to be repeated, and is a means of grace. The United Methodist Church generally practices Baptism by sprinkling, pouring, or immersion and uses the Trinitarian formula. United Methodists also recognize as valid baptisms performed in several other Christian denominations. The Church practices and encourages infant baptism; when persons baptized as infants mature, they may confirm (or reject) the baptismal vows made on their behalf as infants by families, guardians, and congregations through a process of Christian education called Confirmation. The United Methodist Church affirms the real presence of Christ in Holy Communion, but does not hold to the Catholic dogma of transubstantiation. The Church believes that the bread is an effectual sign of His body crucified on the cross and the cup is an effectual sign of His blood shed for humanity. Through the outward and visible signs of bread and wine, the inward and spiritual reality of the Body and Blood of Christ are offered to believers. The Church holds that the celebration of the Eucharist is an anamnesis of Jesus' death, and believes the sacrament to be a means of grace, and practices open communion.
- Free will. The UMC believes that people, while corrupted by sin, are free to make their own choices because of God's divine grace enabling them, and that people are truly accountable before God for their choices.
- Social Justice. The Church opposes evils such as slavery, inhumane prison conditions, capital punishment, economic injustice, child labor, racism, and inequality.

=== Distinctive Wesleyan emphases ===
The key emphasis of Wesley's theology relates to how divine grace operates within the individual. Wesley defined the Way of Salvation as the operation of grace in at least three parts: Prevenient Grace, Justifying Grace, and Sanctifying Grace.

Prevenient grace, or the grace that "goes before" us, is given to all people. It is that power which enables us to love and motivates us to seek a relationship with God through Jesus Christ. This grace is the present work of God to turn us from our sin-corrupted human will to the loving will of the Father. In this work, God desires that we might sense both our sinfulness before God and God's offer of salvation. Prevenient grace allows those tainted by sin to nevertheless make a truly free choice to accept or reject God's salvation in Christ.

Justifying Grace or Accepting Grace is that grace, offered by God to all people, that we receive by faith and trust in Christ, through which God pardons the believer of sin. It is in justifying grace we are received by God, in spite of our sin. In this reception, we are forgiven through the atoning work of Jesus Christ on the cross. The justifying grace cancels our guilt and empowers us to resist the power of sin and to fully love God and neighbor. Today, justifying grace is also known as conversion, "accepting Jesus as your personal Lord and Savior," or being "born again." John Wesley originally called this experience the New Birth. This experience can occur in different ways; it can be one transforming moment, such as an altar call experience, or it may involve a series of decisions across a period of time.

Sanctifying Grace is that grace of God which sustains the believers in the journey toward Christian Perfection: a genuine love of God with heart, soul, mind, and strength, and a genuine love of our neighbors as ourselves. Sanctifying grace enables us to respond to God by leading a Spirit-filled and Christ-like life aimed toward love. Wesley never claimed this state of perfection for himself but instead insisted the attainment of perfection was possible for all Christians. Here the English Reformer parted company with both Luther and Calvin, who denied that a man would ever reach a state in this life in which he could not fall into sin. Such a man can lose all inclination to evil and can gain perfection in this life.

Wesleyan theology maintains that salvation is the act of God's grace entirely, from invitation, to pardon, to growth in holiness. Furthermore, God's prevenient, justifying, and sanctifying grace interact dynamically in the lives of Christians from birth to death.

According to Wesleyan understanding, good works are the fruit of one's salvation, not the way in which that salvation was earned. Faith and good works go hand in hand in Methodist theology: a living tree naturally and inevitably bears fruit. Wesleyan theology rejects the doctrine of eternal security, believing that salvation can be rejected. Wesley emphasized that believers must continue to grow in their relationship with Christ, through the process of Sanctification.

A key outgrowth of this theology is the United Methodist dedication not only to the Evangelical Gospel of repentance and a personal relationship with God, but also to the Social Gospel and a commitment to social justice issues that have included abolition, women's suffrage, labor rights, civil rights, and ministry with the poor.

=== Characterization of Wesleyan theology ===
Methodist theology stands at a unique crossroads between evangelical, holiness and sacramental, as well as between liturgical and charismatic, and between Anglo-Catholic and Reformed worship. It has been characterized as Wesleyan–Arminian theology with an emphasis on the work of the Holy Spirit to bring holiness into the life of the participating believer. The United Methodist Church believes in prima scriptura, seeing the Bible as the primary authority in the Church and using sacred tradition, reason, and experience to interpret it, with the aid of the Holy Spirit (see Wesleyan Quadrilateral). Therefore, according to The Book of Discipline, United Methodist theology is at once "catholic, evangelical, and reformed."

Today, the UMC is generally considered one of the more moderate and tolerant denominations with respect to race, gender, and ideology, though the denomination itself includes a wide spectrum of attitudes. Comparatively, the UMC stands to the right of liberal and progressive Protestant groups such as the United Church of Christ and the Episcopal Church on certain issues (until recently regarding sexuality), but to the left of historically conservative evangelical traditions such as the Southern Baptists and Pentecostalism, in regard to theological matters such as social justice and Biblical interpretation. The UMC is made up of a broad diversity of thought, and so there are many clergy and laity within the UMC that hold differing viewpoints on such theological matters.

=== Diversity within beliefs ===
In appealing for tolerance of diversity of theological opinions, John Wesley said, "Though we may not think alike, may we not all love alike?" The phrase "In essentials, unity; in non-essentials, liberty; in all things, charity" has also become a maxim among Methodists, who have always maintained a great diversity of opinion on many matters within the Church.

The United Methodist Church allows for a wide range of theological and political beliefs. For example, former President George W. Bush (R-TX), former First Lady Laura Bush and former Attorney General of the United States, Jeff Sessions, are United Methodists, as are Senator Elizabeth Warren (D-MA), former Secretary of State Hillary Clinton (D-NY) and former Senator Max Cleland (D-GA).

The Pew Research Center's 2014 US Religious Landscape Study concluded that the political preferences of US adult members of the United Methodist Church was 54 percent Republican / lean Republican, 35 percent Democrat / lean Democrat, and 11 percent independent / no lean / other.

=== Social issues ===
==== Abortion ====
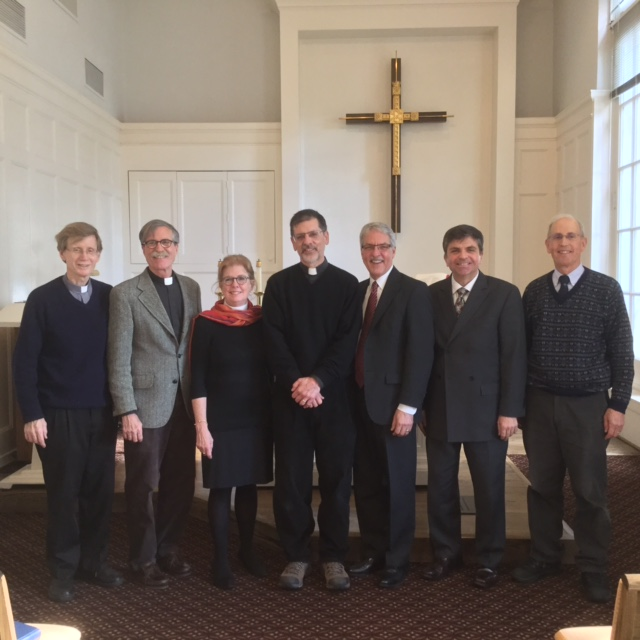
UMC clergy and laity at the 2017 United Methodist event for the March for Life hosted by Lifewatch, Taskforce of United Methodists on Abortion and Sexuality at the United Methodist Building, Washington, D.C.

The topic of abortion is complex for the United Methodist Church. The United Methodist Church affirms these two sentences in The Social Principles: "Our belief in the sanctity of unborn human life makes us reluctant to approve abortion. But we are equally bound to respect the sacredness of the life and well-being of the mother and the unborn child." (Book of Discipline ¶161.J). The denomination is committed to "assist[ing] the ministry of crisis pregnancy centers and pregnancy resource centers that compassionately help women find feasible alternatives to abortion." In 2016, the United Methodist General Conference voted to withdraw from the Religious Coalition for Reproductive Choice (RCRC), an organization in which it formerly held membership. Annual Conferences could still choose whether to remain a part of the RCRC locally. At the same General Conference, delegates voted to delete a four-decade-old statement from the Book of Resolutions which affirmed the Roe v. Wade Supreme Court decision on the legality of abortion. A new resolution was re-adopted 56–2 in a resolutions subcommittee, decrying gender-selective abortion while also describing abortion as "violent" and opposing abortions done for "trivial reasons." The resolution passed in the daily consent agenda with no debate. As an official organization, however, "the General Board of Church and Society continues to be an advocate for a full range of safe and legal reproductive health care – including, in certain cases, the option to safely and legally end a pregnancy."

Nevertheless, the United Methodist Church holds that "while we understand the need for women to have access to safe, legal abortions, we also 'mourn and are committed to promoting the diminishment of high abortion rates'." and they "are equally bound to respect the sacredness of the life and well-being of the mother, for whom devastating damage may result from an unacceptable pregnancy. In continuity with past Christian teaching, we recognize tragic conflicts of life with life that may justify abortion, (in the eyes of God) and in such cases we support the legal option of abortion under proper medical procedures." The Church cautions that "Governmental laws and regulations do not provide all the guidance required by the informed Christian conscience." The Church emphasizes the need of a supportive ministry to women who have experienced abortions: "We further encourage local churches to make available contact information for counseling agencies that offer programs to address post-abortion stress for all seeking help."

Members of the United Methodist Church who identify with the anti-abortion position come mostly from the Confessing Movement within the denomination and have organized into the Taskforce of United Methodists on Abortion and Sexuality (TUMAS) to further their position within the denomination. On the other side, the Methodist Federation for Social Action and United Methodist Women continue to represent pro-choice views.

==== Alcohol ====
Historically, the Methodist Church has supported the temperance movement. John Wesley warned against the dangers of drinking in his famous sermon, "The Use of Money", and in his letter to an alcoholic. Today the United Methodist Church states that it "affirms our long-standing support of abstinence from alcohol as a faithful witness to God's liberating and redeeming love for persons." In fact, the United Methodist Church uses unfermented grape juice in the sacrament of Holy Communion, thus "expressing pastoral concern for recovering alcoholics, enabling the participation of children and youth, and supporting the church's witness of abstinence." Moreover, in 2011 and 2012, the United Methodist Church's General Board of Church and Society called on all United Methodists to abstain from alcohol for Lent.

==== Anti-racism ====
The United Methodist Constitution says “The United Methodist Church proclaims that from God’s goodness and love, God created all persons as God’s unique and beloved children. Racism opposes God’s law, goodness and love and diminishes the image of God in each person. Fueled by white privilege, white supremacy and colonialism, the sin of racism has been a destructive scourge on global society and throughout the history of The United Methodist Church. It continues to destroy our communities, harm persons, obstruct unity and undermine God’s work in this world. Racism must be eradicated. Therefore, The United Methodist Church commits to confronting and eliminating all forms of racism, racial inequity, colonialism, white privilege and white supremacy, in every facet of its life and in society at large.” This statement strengthened the United Methodist Church’s commitment to ending racism, and was passed at the 2024 General Conference and ratified into its Constitution by the worldwide church in 2025.

==== Capital punishment ====
The United Methodist Church, along with some other Methodist churches, condemns capital punishment, saying that it cannot accept retribution or social vengeance as a reason for taking human life. The Church also holds that the death penalty falls unfairly and unequally upon marginalized persons including the poor, the uneducated, ethnic and religious minorities, and persons with mental and emotional illnesses. The United Methodist Church also believes that Jesus explicitly repudiated the lex talionis in Matthew 5:38–39 and abolished the death penalty in John 8:7. The General Conference of the United Methodist Church calls for its bishops to uphold opposition to capital punishment and for governments to enact an immediate moratorium on carrying out the death penalty sentence.

==== Creation ====
The United Methodist Church, like many mainline Protestant denominations and the Roman Catholic Church, has determined that there is no conflict between faith and the theory of evolution. Some clergy have stated that "it's time for people of faith to accept evolution." Additionally, the UMC officially affirms the theory of evolution and "opposes introducing theories such as Creationism or Intelligent Design into public school curriculum." In 2016, the denomination denied approval for a creationist group to be officially represented at the church's General Conference.

==== Euthanasia ====
The United Methodist Church is opposed to euthanasia and assisted suicide. The official stance mentions that "The church has an obligation to see that all persons have access to needed pastoral and medical care and therapy in those circumstances that lead to loss of self-worth, suicidal despair, and/or the desire to seek physician-assisted suicide." It also states that "If death is deliberately sought as the means to relieve suffering, that must be understood as direct and intentional taking of life ... The United Methodist tradition opposes the taking of life as an offense against God's sole dominion over life, and an abandonment of hope and humility before God."

The United Methodist Church, represented by Bishop Scott Jones of the Texas Annual Conference, on behalf of the Houston Methodist Research Institute, and the Roman Catholic Church, represented by Archbishop Vincenzo Paglia, of the Pontifical Academy for Life, signed a "Joint Declaration on the End of Life and Palliative Care", on 17 September 2018, reaffirming the common stance of both denominations in opposing euthanasia.

==== Gambling ====
The United Methodist Church opposes gambling, believing that it is a sin which feeds on human greed and which invites people to place their trust in possessions, rather than in God, whom Christians should "love ... with all your heart." It quotes the Apostle Paul who states:

But those who want to be rich fall into temptation and are trapped by many senseless and harmful desires that plunge people into ruin and destruction. For the love of money is a root of all kinds of evil, and in their eagerness to be rich some have wandered away from the faith and pierced themselves with many pains.

— 1 Tim. 6:9-10a

The United Methodist Church therefore holds that:

- Gambling is a menace to society, deadly to the best interests of moral, social, economic, and spiritual life, and destructive of good government. As an act of faith and concern, Christians should abstain from gambling and should strive to minister to those victimized by the practice.
- Where gambling has become addictive, the Church will encourage such individuals to receive therapeutic assistance so that the individual's energies may be redirected into positive and constructive ends.
- The Church should promote standards and personal lifestyles that would make unnecessary and undesirable the resort to commercial gambling—including public lotteries—as a recreation, as an escape, or as a means of producing public revenue or funds for support of charities or government.

==== Gun control ====
The United Methodist Church supports federal legislative efforts for strict gun control measures in the United States, and outright bans of most weapons in other nations. The Church also declares all of its churches to be "a weapon-free zone."

==== Sexuality, marriage, ordination, and LGBTQIA+ inclusion ====
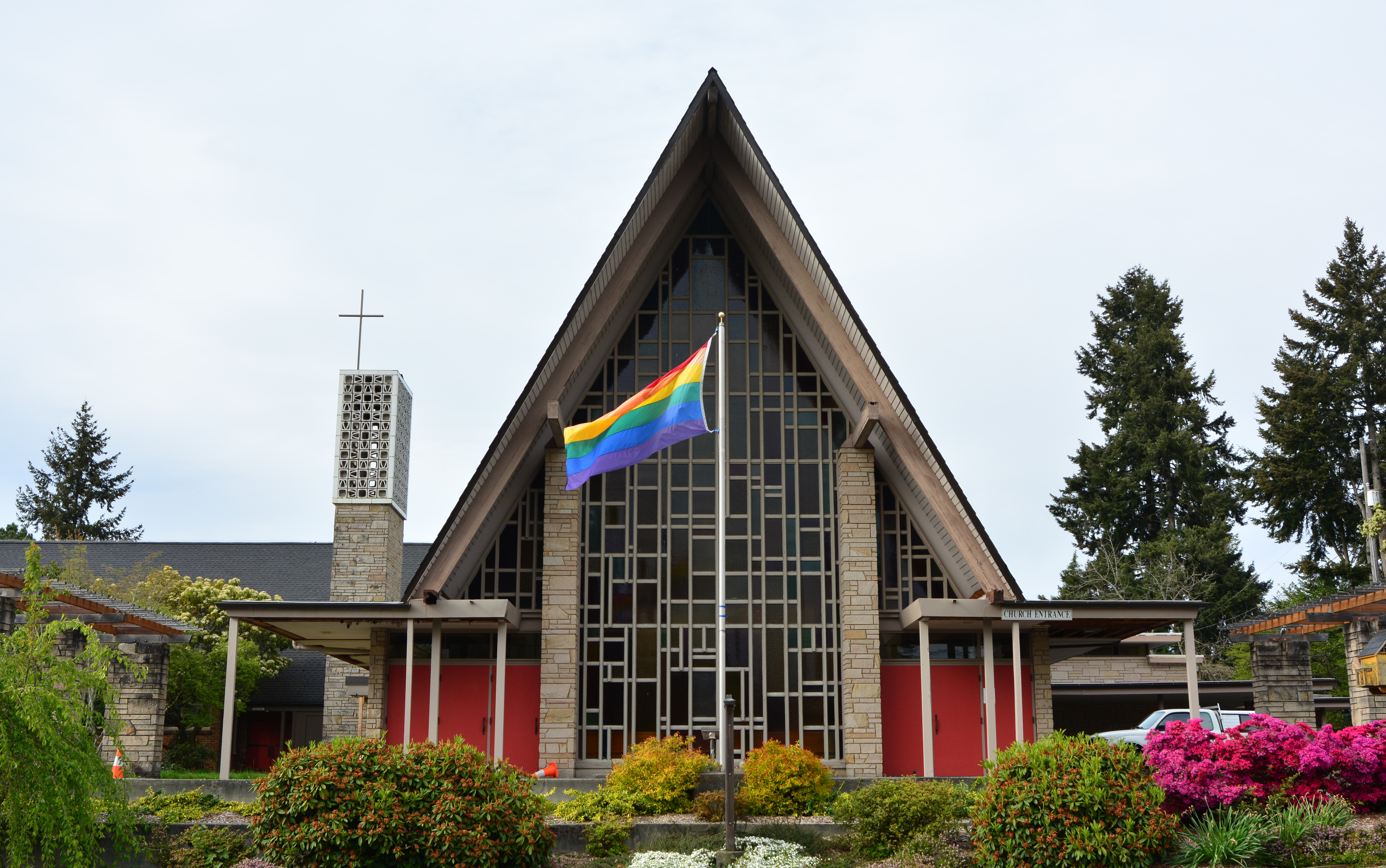
Sand Point Community United Methodist Church in Seattle flies a pride flag, April 2014.

According to The United Methodist Book of Discipline (a new edition of which is usually approved by the United Methodist General Conference every four years), the Church "affirm[s] that all persons are individuals of sacred worth, created in the image of God" and encourages United Methodists to be in ministry with and for all people. During the 2024 General Conference, the United Methodist Church removed previous language prohibiting same-sex marriages and the ordination of partnered LGBTQ clergy. According to polling from Pew Research, the majority of United Methodists in the US support the inclusion of homosexual persons, 60 percent of United Methodists said "homosexuality should be accepted by society", and 40 percent supported same-sex marriage.

In 1732, the founder of Methodism, John Wesley was doing prison ministry and he met Thomas Blair, a man incarcerated for homosexuality. While not defending his actions, Wesley spoke up to the Vice Chancellor against the inhumane treatment of Thomas Blair in prison. Blair also faced the possibility of the death penalty. Wesley also defended Blair in court, and while he was found guilty, his life was spared and John Wesley raised funds to pay his fine so he could be released.

In 1975, progressive churches founded the Affirmation: United Methodists for Lesbian/Gay Concerns network and Reconciling Ministries Network in 1984 for the inclusion of LGBTQ people.

The United Methodist Church previously prohibited same-sex unions. Jimmy Creech was defrocked after a highly publicized church trial in 1999 on account of his participation in same-sex union ceremonies. Other ministers have been defrocked for officiating at same-sex weddings and several trials of others are scheduled. Frank Schaefer, who was defrocked and penalized because he had officiated his son's same-sex wedding, was in 2014, re-instated as "the denomination's top court upheld a June decision by a regional appeals committee to reinstate Schaefer's ministerial credentials." Other clergy, who officiated at same-sex marriages, had avoided trials. In 2016, it was announced that Val Rosenquist "will avoid a church trial and keep her job after she co-officiated with retired Bishop Melvin Talbert at the April same-gender wedding of two church members." In 1971, Gene Leggett was defrocked for being homosexual in southern Texas. In 1987, a United Methodist church court in New Hampshire defrocked Methodist minister Rose Mary Denman for openly living with a same-sex partner. In 2005, clergy credentials were removed from Irene Elizabeth Stroud after she was convicted in a church trial of violating church law by engaging in a lesbian relationship; this conviction was later upheld by the Judicial Council, the highest court in the denomination. The Judicial Council also affirmed that a Virginia pastor had the right to deny local church membership to a man in an openly gay relationship. This affirmation, however, was based upon a senior pastor's right to judge the readiness of a congregant to join as a full member of the church.

On the other hand, hundreds of United Methodist ministers had openly defied the official position of the United Methodist Church and have publicly revealed their "lesbian, gay or bisexual" sexual orientation, an action that could result in their suspension. The New York body also ordained the first openly gay and lesbian clergy. In addition, the Baltimore-Washington Conference of the UMC approved the appointment of an openly partnered lesbian to the diaconate. In 2016, the Western Jurisdiction elected the denomination's first openly and partnered lesbian bishop. While not elected, the UMC reported that the North Central Jurisdiction considered the nomination of an openly gay pastor for bishop.

Although there is no official policy, the Judicial Council of the UMC ruled, in 2007, that ordained transgender pastors could serve in congregations within the denomination. In particular, the first openly transgender pastor within the UMC received overwhelming support from his congregation. In 2016, the South Carolina Annual Conference passed a resolution urging support for non-discrimination protections for transgender people. In 2017, the Northern Illinois Conference commissioned M Barclay as a Deacon and they became the first openly non-binary trans person commissioned in the denomination.

On April 28, 2017, the Judicial Council ruled that consecrating a bishop in a same-sex marriage or partnership is a violation of church law at the time and that public marriage records could be considered as evidence of self-avowed homosexuality. In regards to the specific case of Bishop Karen Oliveto, the denomination's first openly gay bishop, the Judicial Council ruled that she "remains in good standing" pending the outcome of any administrative or judicial processes initiated within the Western Jurisdiction, since the Judicial Council itself does not have jurisdiction to review Bishop Oliveto's status. The Judicial Council also ruled that Boards of Ordained Ministry must evaluate all candidates regarding issues of sexuality.

On May 7, 2018, the Council of Bishops in the United Methodist Church proposed allowing individual pastors and regional church bodies to decide whether to ordain LGBT clergy and perform same-sex weddings. However, on February 26, 2019, a special session of the General Conference rejected this proposal, and voted to strengthen its official opposition to same-sex marriages and ordaining openly LGBT clergy. The vote was 53 percent in favor of the Traditional Plan, the plan maintaining and strengthening the official position, to 47 percent opposed. The Judicial Council had already ruled some parts of the Traditional Plan to be unconstitutional. The delegates also voted to send the plan for further review by the Judicial Council. In March 2019, the German Central Conference announced that it would not be imposing the Traditional Plan. Before the denomination restructured in 2025 through Worldwide Regionalization, the US jurisdictions and Annual Conferences (local governing bodies) were unable to adapt the Book of Discipline like the (formerly-named) Central Conferences (outside the United States). Despite this, the Western Jurisdiction declared their disagreement with the 2019 Traditional Plan and vowed to maintain LGBTQ inclusive policies. In April 2019, the Judicial Council ruled on the 17 petitions of the Traditional Plan, upholding 10 as valid and rejecting 7 as unconstitutional.

In September 2019, First United Methodist Church Moheto in Kenya became the first United Methodist Church in Africa to officially align itself with the Reconciling Ministries Network, which advocates for LGBTQIA+ inclusion in the church.

On January 3, 2020, some denominational leaders along with various advocacy groups submitted a plan called, "Protocol of Reconciliation and Grace through Separation," to split the church over what it described as "fundamental differences" over issues pertaining to sexual orientation and gender identity, particularly same-sex marriage. The "Protocol of Reconciliation and Grace through Separation" plan would create a new traditionalist Methodist denomination (which came to be the Global Methodist Church), with the existing church moving to more acceptance of non-heterosexual and gender-nonconforming identities. The church's General Conference was expected to vote on the plan in May 2020. The plan would have needed to be approved in May 2020 by the General Conference. It would grant the new denomination $25 million and would allow local churches to vote to affiliate with the new denomination and keep their assets if they leave. The vote was later postponed to 2021 due to the COVID-19 pandemic. Progressives, too, announced the creation of a new denomination in November 2020, the Liberation Methodist Connexion. In 2022, the Western Jurisdiction elected a second openly gay bishop, Cedrick Bridgeforth, who also is the denomination's first black gay Bishop.

During the 2024 General Conference, on April 25, 2024, the delegates passed a proposal to restructure the UMC, establishing regionalization that would allow each region to determine its own standards for same-sex marriage and the ordination of partnered LGBTQ clergy. Due to the proposal being a constitutional change, the proposal will need to be ratified by a two-thirds majority of votes cast during the local Annual Conferences. In November 2025, Worldwide Regionalization was ratified, renaming former Central Conferences to Regional Conferences and creating a US Regional Conference granting equal autonomy between Regions around the world, decolonizing the United Methodist Church. Multiple petitions were brought to amend statutory language regarding sexuality during General Conference. On April 30, 2024, the UMC removed penalties for clergy performing same-sex marriages, removed the ban on funding for LGBTQ-affirming organizations, and removed the prohibition on considering openly LGBTQ candidates for ordained ministry. On May 1, 2024, the General Conference of the UMC voted to repeal the prior prohibitions against clergy performing same-sex marriages and the ordination of openly partnered LGBTQ clergy. On May 2, the General Conference voted to approve more petitions, which amended the UMC Social Principles to remove language stating that "the practice of homosexuality ... is incompatible with Christian teaching"; revises the language on marriage to state that it is "a sacred lifelong covenant that brings two people of faith [adult man and woman of consenting age or two adult persons of consenting age] into union with one another and into deeper relationship with God and the religious community"; states opposition to both child marriage and polygamy; and affirms support for consent in sexual relations. On May 3, during the final day of business, the General Conference removed language from church law imposing potential penalties for officiating at same-sex weddings, penalties for being in a same-sex relationship themselves, prohibitions against clergy from officiating or churches hosting same-sex weddings, and mandates that clergy practice celibacy in singleness. In addition, General Conference added language allowing clergy to abstain from officiating any weddings. The Conference maintained the chargeable offense of "immorality" but voted against defining the offense to include infidelity or non-celibacy.

At the 2024 General Conference, a Constitutional Amendment was passed adding gender and ability to the membership nondiscrimination statement and was ratified in 2025 by the worldwide church, reading “All persons, without regard to race, gender, ability, color, national origin, status, or economic condition, shall be eligible to attend its worship services, participate in its programs, receive the sacraments, upon baptism be admitted as baptized members, and upon taking vows declaring the Christian faith, become professing members in any local church in the connection.”

In 2025, ReconcilingWorks has 1,439 churches in 5 countries that support blessings of same-sex marriage.

==== Military service ====
According to The Book of Resolutions of The United Methodist Church, "The United Methodist Church calls upon all who choose to take up arms or who order others to do so to evaluate their actions in accordance with historic church teaching limiting resort to war, including questions of proportionality, legal authority, discrimination between combatants and noncombatants, just cause, and probability of success...."

The United Methodist Church opposes conscription as incompatible with the teaching of Scripture. Therefore, the Church supports and extends its ministry to those persons who conscientiously oppose all war, or any particular war, and who therefore refuse to serve in the armed forces or to cooperate with systems of military conscription. However, the United Methodist Church also supports and extends its ministry to those persons who conscientiously choose to serve in the armed forces or to accept alternative service. The church also states that "as Christians they are aware that neither the way of military action, nor the way of inaction is always righteous before God."

The United Methodist Church maintains that war is incompatible with Christ's message and teachings. Therefore, the Church rejects war as an instrument of national foreign policy, to be employed only as a last resort in the prevention of such evils as genocide, brutal suppression of human rights, and unprovoked international aggression. It insists that the first moral duty of all nations is to resolve by peaceful means every dispute that arises between or among them; that human values must outweigh military claims as governments determine their priorities; that the militarization of society must be challenged and stopped; that the manufacture, sale, and deployment of armaments must be reduced and controlled; and that the production, possession, or use of nuclear weapons be condemned. Consequently, the United Methodist Church endorses general and complete disarmament under strict and effective international control.

The United Methodist Church, like many Mainline Protestant denominations in the U.S., has a long tradition of providing ordained military chaplains who serve in all branches of the U.S. Armed Forces.

==== Pornography ====
The United Methodist Church teaches that pornography is "not only about sex; it is often about violence, degradation, exploitation, and coercion," and their website states that the Church "oppose[s] all forms of pornography." The Sexual Ethics Task Force of The United Methodist Church states that "Research shows it [pornography] is not an 'innocent activity'. It is harmful and is generally addictive. Persons who are addicted to pornography are physiologically altered, as is their perspective, relationships with parishioners and family, and their perceptions of girls and women."

==== Stem cell research ====
The UMC supports federal funding for research on embryos created for in vitro fertilization that remain after the procreative efforts have ceased, if the embryos were provided for research instead of being destroyed, were not obtained by sale, and those donating had given prior informed consent for the research purposes. The UMC stands in "opposition to the creation of embryos for the sake of research" as "a human embryo, even at its earliest stages, commands our reverence." It supports research on stem cells retrieved from umbilical cords and adult stem cells, stating that there are "few moral questions" raised by this issue.

== Worship and liturgy ==
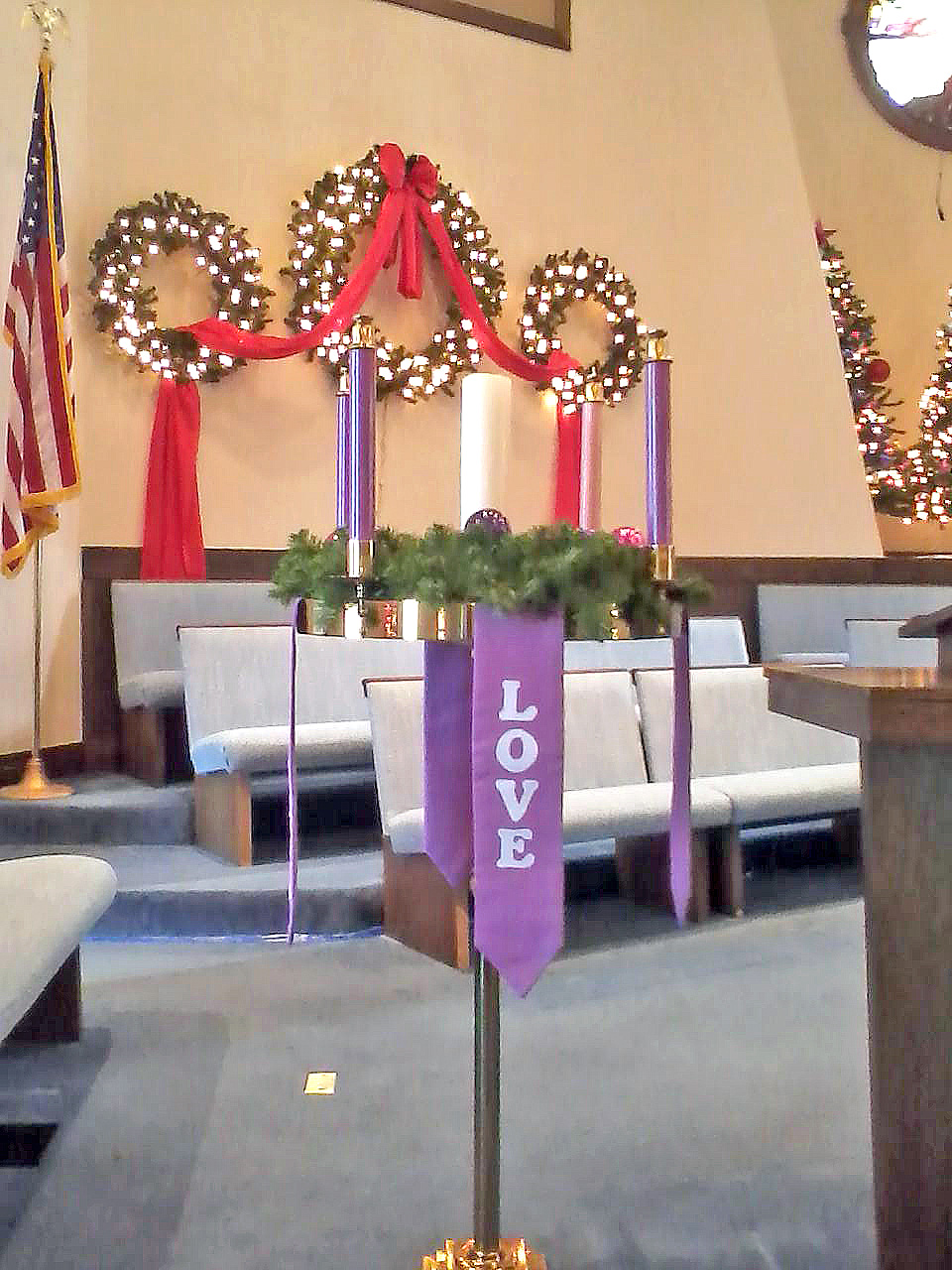
An Advent wreath in the chancel of Broadway United Methodist Church, located in New Philadelphia, Ohio

The United Methodist Church includes a variety of approaches to public worship. The common pattern of worship is found in the official liturgies of the church, while the practices of congregations across the denomination are quite diverse.

The common pattern comes from John Wesley, who wrote that "there is no Liturgy in the world, either in ancient or modern language, which breathes more of a solid, scriptural, rational piety, than the Common Prayer of the Church of England." When the Methodists in America were separated from the Church of England, John Wesley himself provided a revised version of The Book of Common Prayer called The Sunday Service of the Methodists; With Other Occasional Services. Wesley's Sunday Service has shaped the official liturgies of the Methodists ever since.

Like other historic Christian churches, the United Methodist Church has official liturgies for services of Holy Communion, baptism, weddings, funerals, ordination, anointing of the sick and daily office prayer services. Some clergy offer healing services, while exorcism is an occasional practice by some clergy in The United Methodist Church in Africa. These services involve the laying on of hands and anointing with oil. Along with these, there are also special services for holy days such as All Saints Day, Ash Wednesday, Maundy Thursday, Good Friday, and Easter Vigil. These services are contained in The United Methodist Hymnal and The United Methodist Book of Worship (1992). Many of these liturgies are derived from the Anglican tradition's Book of Common Prayer. In most cases, congregations also use other elements of liturgical worship, such as candles, optional use of incense at evening prayer, vestments, paraments, banners, and liturgical art.

Typical worship services in United Methodism will include:

- Singing. Since the days of Charles Wesley, the hymn-writer and early Methodist leader, lively singing has been, and remains, an important aspect of United Methodist worship. The church publishes an official hymnal, The United Methodist Hymnal, for use in churches, and allows for music ranging from hymns to contemporary worship music to be played as part of the service.
- A Biblical Message. Listening to the reading of Scripture and a sermon based upon the Biblical text is virtually always included in United Methodist worship. Many United Methodist churches follow the Revised Common Lectionary for their Sunday Bible readings.
- Prayer. Many churches include a time of response or a prayer time in which people may share concerns or pray with ministers. This time of response may include celebrations of baptism, confirmation, or profession of faith.
- Holy Communion. Some congregations celebrate communion on the first Sunday of the month and a few celebrate it only quarterly. A growing number of congregations celebrate the sacrament of Holy Communion on a weekly basis, as John Wesley himself encouraged his followers to practice. In adopting the statement on Holy Communion, entitled This Holy Mystery, in 2004, the General Conference of the Church urged congregations to move toward weekly celebration of communion and to use the official liturgies of the church when doing so.
- Lovefeast. Many congregations celebrate the Lovefeast (also known as the Agape Feast) on a quarterly basis, which is accompanied by the partaking of bread and water, as well as the sharing of testimonies, Scripture readings and hymn singing.
- Giving. Almost every service has an opportunity for those gathered to give of their "tithes and offerings" to support the ministry of that particular congregation. Through apportionments, a portion of those gifts go to Christian ministries that have a national or global impact.

Many larger United Methodist congregations have incorporated more contemporary styles of music and audio-visual technology into some of their worship services, though these churches generally also offer more traditional services.

As John Wesley advocated outdoor evangelism, revival services are a traditional worship practice of Methodism that are often held in United Methodist churches, as well as at outdoor camp meetings and at tent revivals.

The chancel of United Methodist churches usually features a lectern and baptismal font on one side of the altar table and a pulpit on the other side. The chancel also features the Christian Flag and sometimes, a processional cross. The chancel is often delimited by chancel rails, sometimes with a mourner's bench in front of it.

=== Music ===
Many styles and cultures of music are used in United Methodist Churches, and will vary by church. Charles Wesley, brother of the founder of Methodism John Wesley, wrote over 6,500 hymns and possibly up to 10,000. Some famous hymns by Charles Wesley sung throughout Christianity across denominations include but are not limited to O for a Thousand Tongues to Sing, Hark! The Herald Angels Sing, Christ the Lord is Risen Today, Come, Thou Long Expected Jesus, Love Divine, All Loves Excelling, Jesus Lover of my Soul, And Can It Be, A Charge to Keep I Have, Rejoice the Lord is King, Christ Whose Glory Fills the Skies, and many others

=== Order of worship ===
A typical United Methodist order of worship may include the following elements, although it can vary by church:

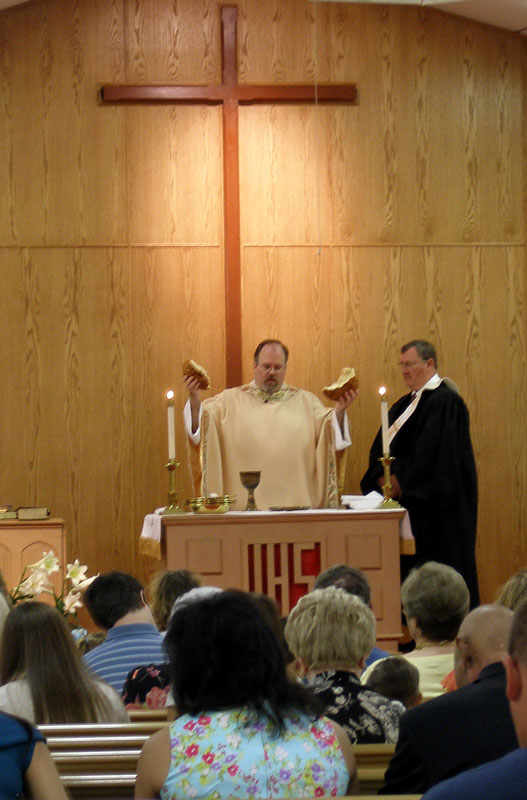
An Elder presides over Holy Communion

==== Gathering ====
- Prelude
- Chiming of the Hour
- The Procession
- Lighting of the Candles
- Voluntary
- Introit (choral)
- Call to Worship
- Opening Prayer
- Invocation
- Announcements
- Welcoming/Greeting
- Passing the Peace
- Hymn of Praise
- Act of Praise
- Responsive Reading
- Gloria Patri

==== Prayers ====
- Joys and Concerns
- Prayer of Confession
- Absolution
- The Lord's Prayer
- Pastoral Prayer
- Collect
- Prayer of Intercession
- Bidding Prayer
- Prayer of the People

==== Proclamation ====
- Choral Anthem
- Choral Worship
- Drama Presentation
- The Lessons
  (Old Testament/Psalm/Epistle/Gospel)
- Prayer of Illumination
- Hymn of Preparation
- Time of Personal Witness / Testimony
- Children's Sermon / Moments
- Introduction of the Preacher
- Sermon

==== Response ====
- Affirmation of Faith
- Litany of Response
- Altar Call and Conversion
- Invitation to Discipleship
- Offertory
- Doxology
- Hymn of Response

==== Going forth ====
- Benediction
- Closing Prayer
- Extinguishing of the Candles
- Choral Response
- The Recessional
- Postlude

=== Saints ===
The United Methodist Church's understanding of a "saint" is not unique among Protestants, yet differs significantly from the Roman Catholic, Eastern Orthodox, Anglican, and Lutheran views. Methodists do not have a process for electing people to sainthood. They do not pray to saints, nor do they believe that saints serve as mediators to God. The denomination considers all faithful Christians to be saints.

Methodist institutions may be named after a biblical figure (e.g., "St. James UMC"). Methodists also honor notable heroes and heroines of the Christian faith and look to these prominent saints as providing examples of holy living and commitment to Christ that are worthy of imitation. Such exemplary saints include martyrs, confessors of the Faith, evangelists, or important biblical figures such as Saint Matthew. Lutheran theologian and anti-Nazi martyr Dietrich Bonhoeffer, Salvation Army founder William Booth, African missionary David Livingstone and Methodism's revered founder John Wesley are among many cited as Protestant saints.

Article XIV of The United Methodist Articles of Religion explicitly rejects "invocation of saints" (praying to saints). The text reads "—Of Purgatory—The Romish doctrine concerning purgatory, pardon, worshiping, and adoration, as well of images as of relics, and also invocation of saints, is a fond thing, vainly invented, and grounded upon no warrant of Scripture, but repugnant to the Word of God."

== Organization ==
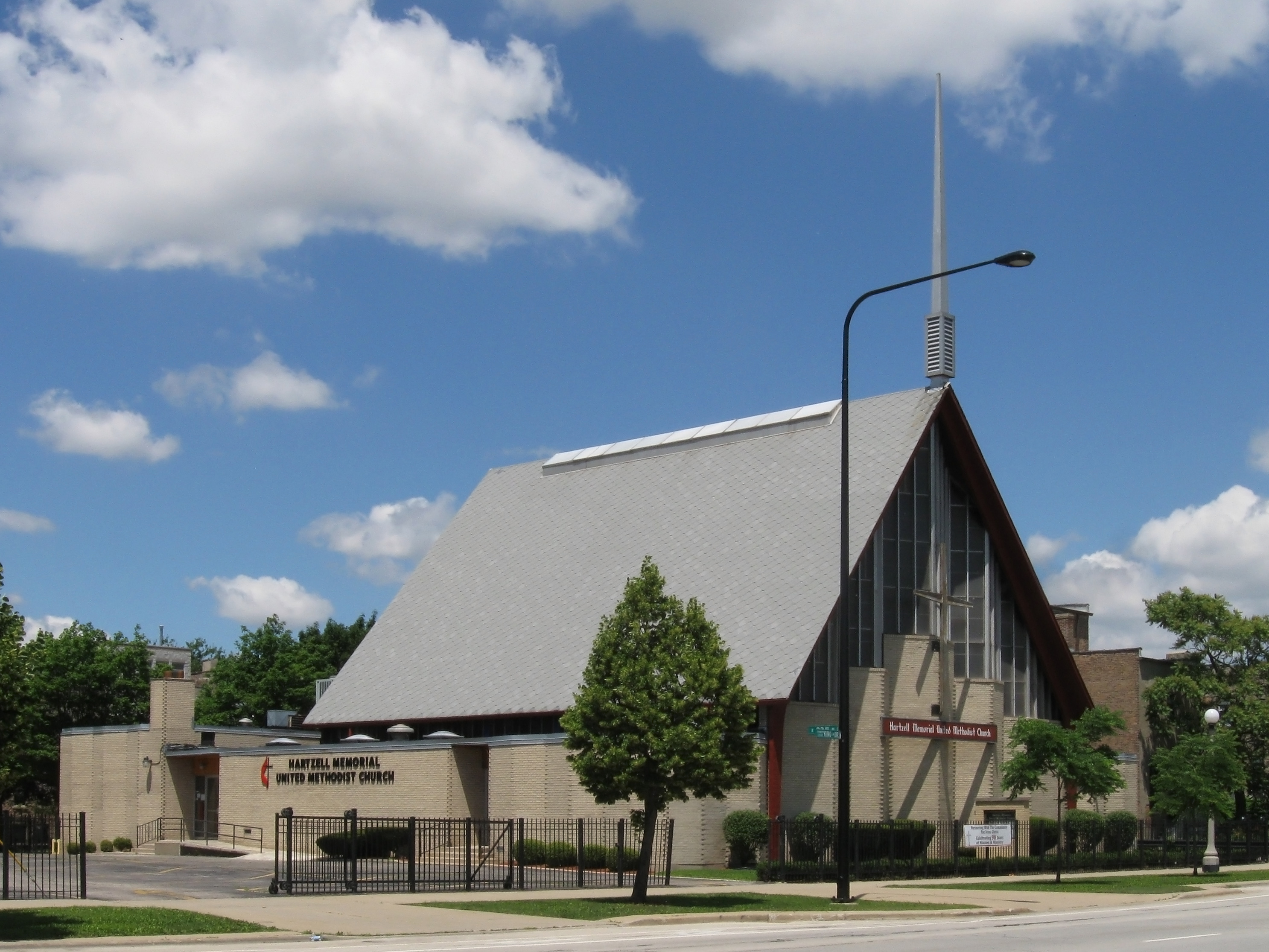
Hartzell Memorial United Methodist church in Chicago, United States

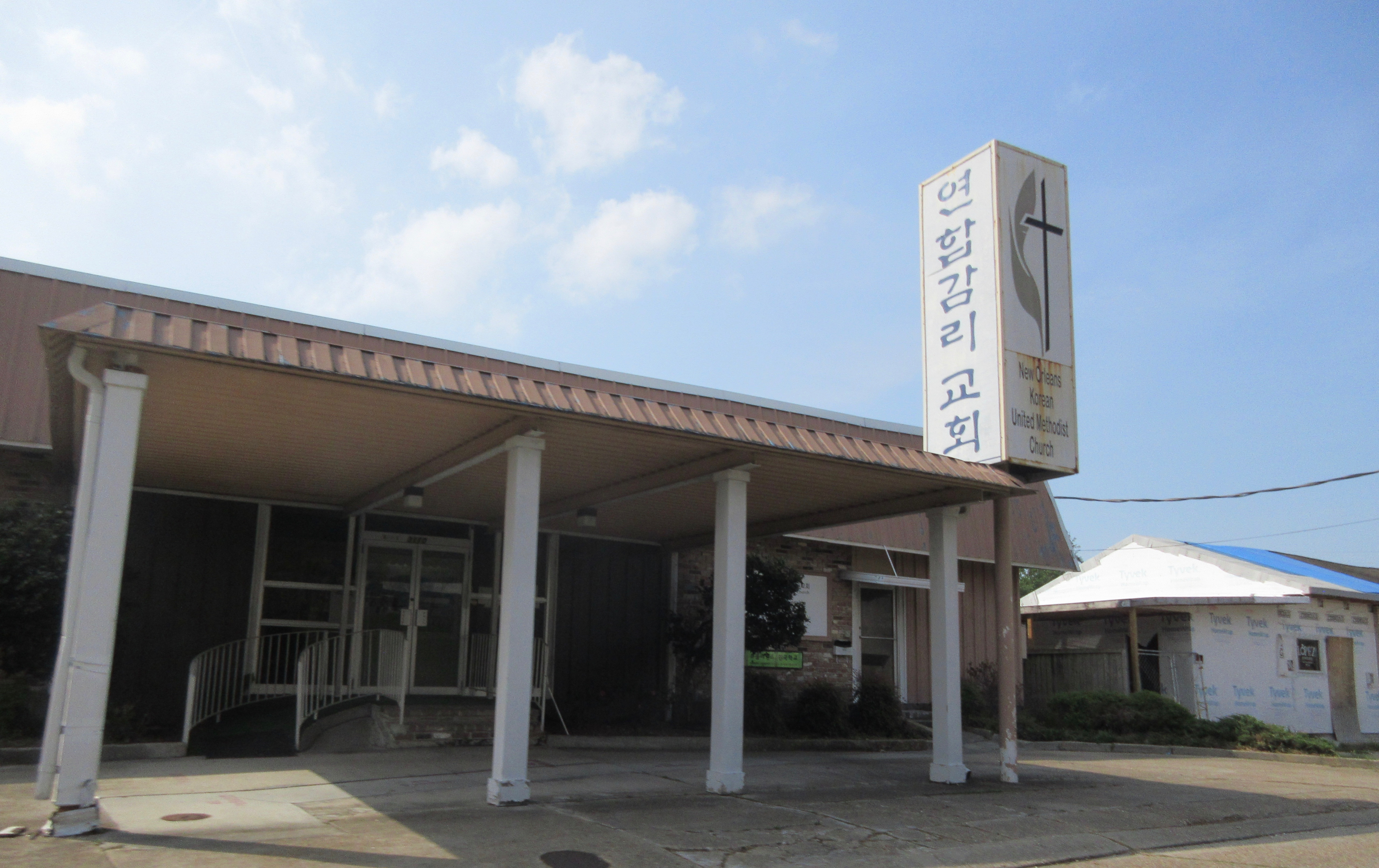
New Orleans Korean United Methodist Church in Metairie, Louisiana, United States

=== Governance ===
The church is decentralized with the General Conference being the official governing body. However, administratively the church has a governing structure that is similar to that of the United States government:

- General Conference—The legislative branch that makes all decisions as to doctrine and polity.
- Council of Bishops—When taken into consideration along with the various general agencies of the church, takes on a role similar to an executive branch. The Council of Bishops consists of all active and retired bishops and meets twice a year. According to the Book of Discipline 2000, "The Church expects the Council of Bishops to speak to the Church and from the Church to the world, and to give leadership in the quest for Christian unity and interreligious relationships." The council is presided over by a President who serves a two-year term. The President has no official authority beyond presiding. Administrative work is handled by the secretary of the council.
- Judicial Council—The judicial branch consisting of nine persons elected by the General Conference to rule on questions of constitutionality in church law and practice.

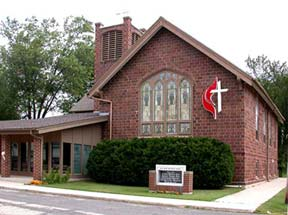
Zion United Methodist Church in Denmark, Wisconsin, United States

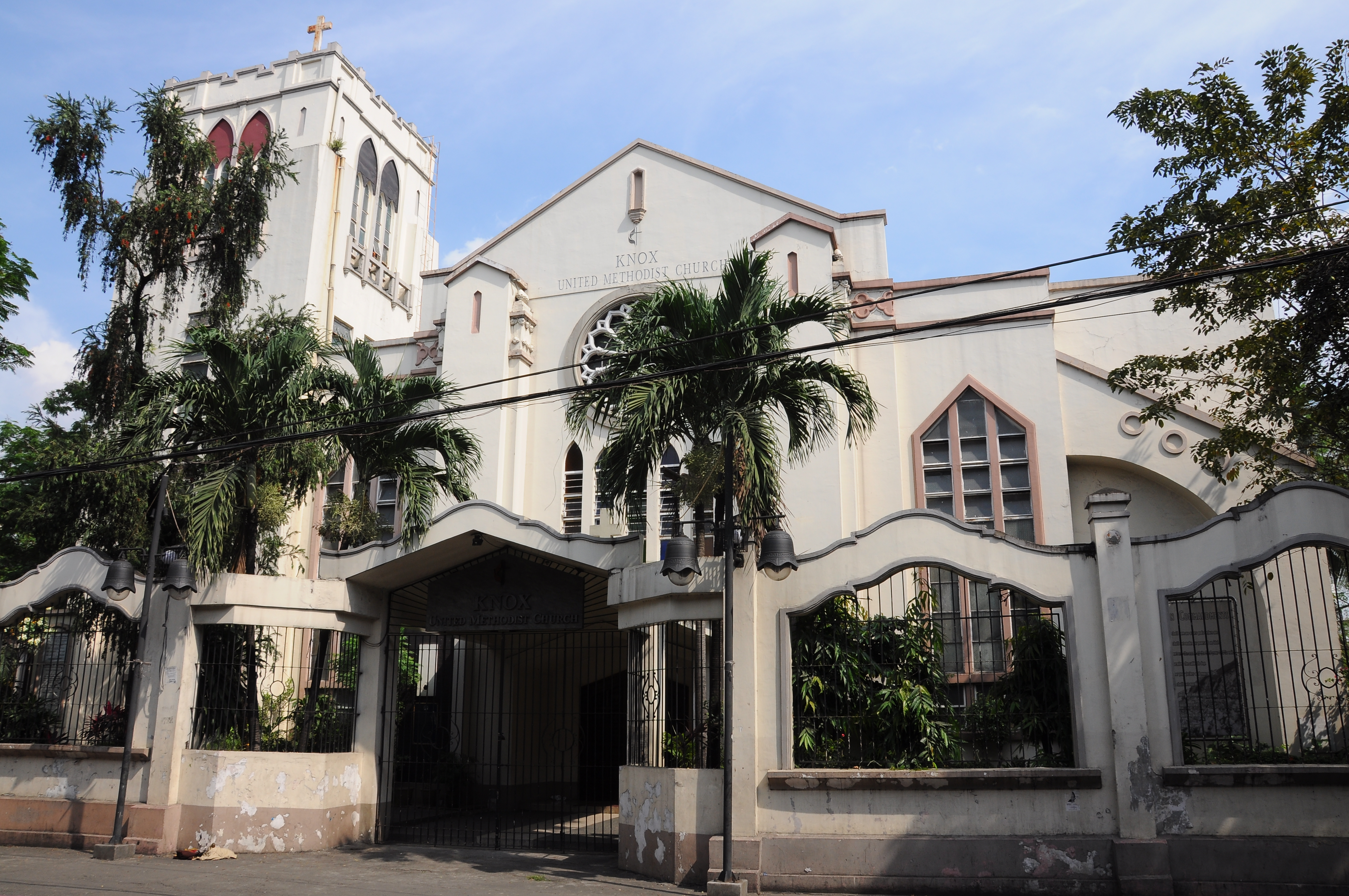

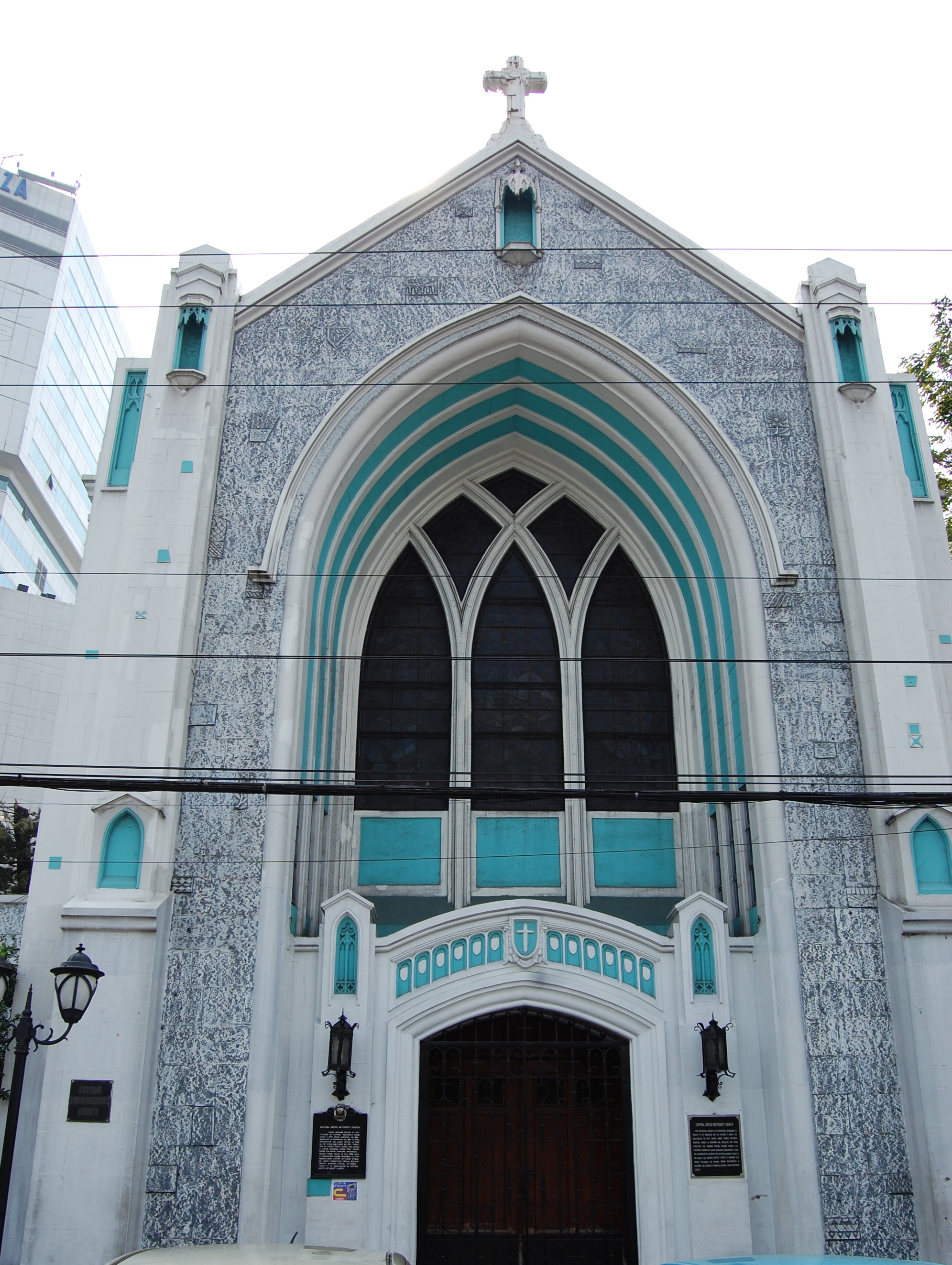
Knox United Methodist Church in Santa Cruz, Manila (above) and Central United Methodist Church in Ermita, Manila (below) were the first two Methodist churches in The Philippines

=== General Conference ===
The United Methodist Church is organized into conferences. The highest level is called the General Conference and is the only organization which may speak officially for the church. The General Conference meets every four years (quadrennium). Legislative changes are recorded in The Book of Discipline which is revised after each General Conference. Non-legislative resolutions are recorded in the Book of Resolutions, which is published after each General Conference, and expire after eight years unless passed again by a subsequent session of General Conference. The most recent General Conferences were held in Portland, Oregon in 2016, and St. Louis, Missouri, in 2019. The event is currently rotated between the US jurisdictions of the church. Bishops, councils, committees, boards, elders, etc., are not permitted to speak on behalf of the United Methodist Church as this authority is reserved solely for the General Conference in accordance with the Book of Discipline.

The plenary session is presided over by an active bishop who has been selected by a committee of delegates to the conference. It is not uncommon for different bishops to preside on different days. The presiding officer is usually accompanied by parliamentarians.

The church had planned for a conference outside of the United States for the first time in history in 2024. These plans were established in 2015 for the first meeting. However, these plans were cancelled because organizers were unable to find a convention space that would be available for two weeks to host the global gathering. Sara Hotchkiss, business manager for the Commission on General Conference stated:

"No one has done anything wrong, or there's no reason not to go. It's just simply when we did a bid process, the facilities needed for the length of our conference were not available,"

=== Jurisdictional and regional conferences ===
Subordinate to the General Conference are the Jurisdictional and Regional conferences which also meet every four years. The United States is divided into five jurisdictions: Northeastern, Southeastern, North Central, South Central and Western. Globally, the church is divided into nine Regional Conferences: 4 in Africa including Southern Africa, Mid Africa, East Africa, and West Africa; 1 in The Philippines; 3 in Europe including Central and Southern Europe, Germany, and Nordic-Baltic-Ukraine; and 1 in the United States. The main purpose of the jurisdictional and regional conferences is to elect and appoint bishops, the chief administrators of the church. Additionally, Regional Conferences may limitedly adapt the church law to the needs of their areas. Bishops thus elected serve episcopal areas, which consist of one or more annual conferences. Before November 2025, regional conferences were known as central conferences and the US did not have such a conference with powers to adapt the Book of Discipline.

In the US, decisions in-between the four-year meetings are made by the Mission Council (usually consisting of church bishops). One of the most high-profile decisions in recent years by one of the councils was a decision by the Mission Council of the South Central Jurisdiction which in March 2007 approved a 99-year lease of 36 acres (150,000 m^{2}) at Southern Methodist University for the George W. Bush Presidential Library. The decision generated controversy in light of Bush's support of the Iraq War which the church bishops have criticized. A debate over whether the decision should or could be submitted for approval by the Southern Jurisdictional Conference at its July 2008 meeting in Dallas, Texas, remains unresolved.

=== Judicial Council ===
The Judicial Council is the highest court in the denomination. It consists of nine members, who are elected by the General Conference for an eight-year term. Its membership consists of both laity and clergy: the ratio of laity to clergy alternates every eight years. The Judicial Council interprets the Book of Discipline between sessions of General Conference, and during General Conference, the Judicial Council rules on the constitutionality of laws passed by General Conference. The Council also determines whether actions of local churches, annual conferences, church agencies, and bishops are in accordance with church law. The Council reviews all decisions of law made by bishops. The Judicial Council cannot create any legislation; it can only interpret existing legislation. The Council meets twice a year at various locations throughout the world. The Judicial Council also hears appeals from those who have been accused of chargeable offenses that can result in defrocking or revocation of membership.

=== Annual conference ===
The annual conference, roughly the equivalent of a diocese in the Anglican Communion and the Roman Catholic Church or a synod in some Lutheran denominations such as the Evangelical Lutheran Church in America, is the basic unit of organization within the UMC. The term annual conference is often used to refer to the geographical area it covers as well as the frequency of meeting. Clergy are members of their annual conference rather than of any local congregation, and are appointed to a local church or other charge annually by the conference's resident bishop at the meeting of the annual conference. In many ways, the United Methodist Church operates in a connectional organization of the annual conferences, and actions taken by one conference are not binding upon another.

=== Districts ===
Annual conferences are further divided into districts, each served by a district superintendent. The district superintendents are also appointed annually from the ordained elders of the annual conference by the bishop. District superintendents, upon completion of their service as superintendent, routinely return to serving local congregations. The annual conference cabinet is composed of the bishop and the district superintendents.

=== Local churches ===
The Book of Discipline is the guidebook for local churches and pastors and describes in considerable detail the organizational structure of local United Methodist churches. All UM churches must have a board of trustees with at least three members and no more than nine members and it is recommended that no gender should hold more than a 2/3 majority. All churches must also have a nominations committee, a finance committee and a church council or administrative council. Other committees are suggested but not required such as a missions committee, or evangelism or worship committee. Term limits are set for some committees but not for all. The church conference is an annual meeting of all the officers of the church and any interested members. This committee has the exclusive power to set pastors' salaries (compensation packages for tax purposes) and to elect officers to the committees.

=== Administrative offices ===
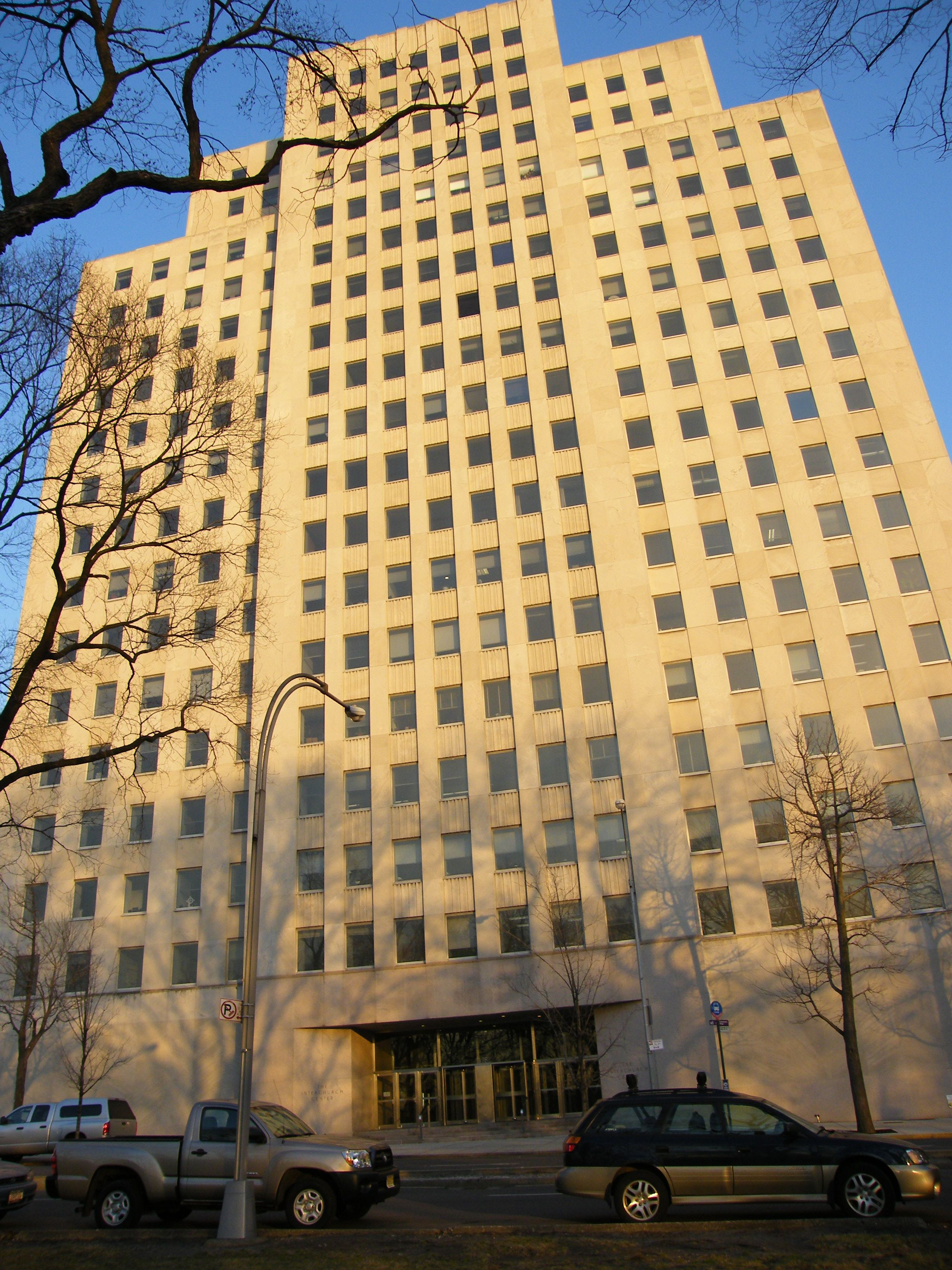
Interchurch Center in New York City, headquarters of the UMW

There is no official headquarters of the UMC although many of its biggest administrative offices are in Nashville, Tennessee, and are physically located near Vanderbilt University (which has historic Methodist ties but is no longer associated with the church).

While the General Conference is the only organization that can officially speak for the United Methodist Church as a whole, there are 13 agencies, boards and commissions of the general church. These organizations address specific topic areas of denomination-wide concern with administrative offices throughout the United States.

- Discipleship Ministries (Nashville, Tennessee)
- Wespath Benefits and Investments (Glenview, Illinois)
- General Board of Church and Society (Washington, D.C.)
- General Board of Global Ministries (Atlanta, Georgia) (GBGM)
  - United Methodist Committee on Relief (Atlanta, GA)
- General Board of Higher Education and Ministry (GBHEM) (Nashville, TN) (GBHEM)
- General Commission on Archives and History (Madison, New Jersey) (GCAH)
- General Commission on Religion and Race (Washington, DC) (GCORR)
- General Commission on the Status and Role of Women (Chicago) (GCSRW)
- General Commission on United Methodist Men (Nashville, Tennessee) (GCUMM)
- General Council on Finance and Administration (Nashville, Tennessee) (GCFA)
- United Methodist Communications (Nashville, Tennessee) (UMCom)
- United Methodist Publishing House (Nashville, Tennessee)
- United Methodist Women (New York City, New York) (UMW)

=== United Methodist Volunteers in Mission ===
United Methodist Volunteers in Mission (UMVIM) is the short-term mission arm of the United Methodist Church. UMVIM coordinates mission projects for over 100,000 United Methodist volunteers every year. UMVIM coordinates over 400 international development projects.

== Education ==
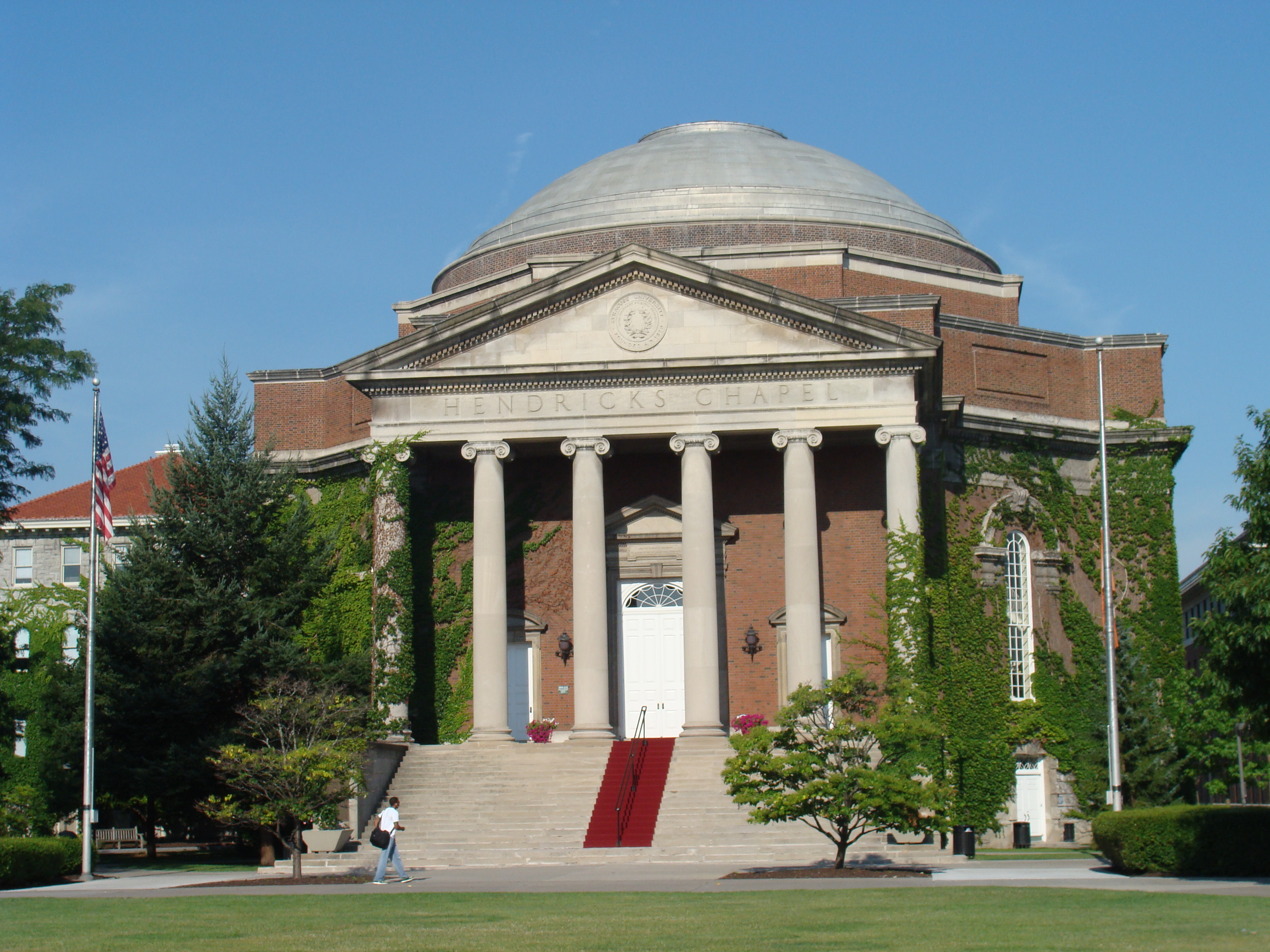
Hendricks Chapel at Syracuse University, New York. The university maintains a relationship with the UMC.

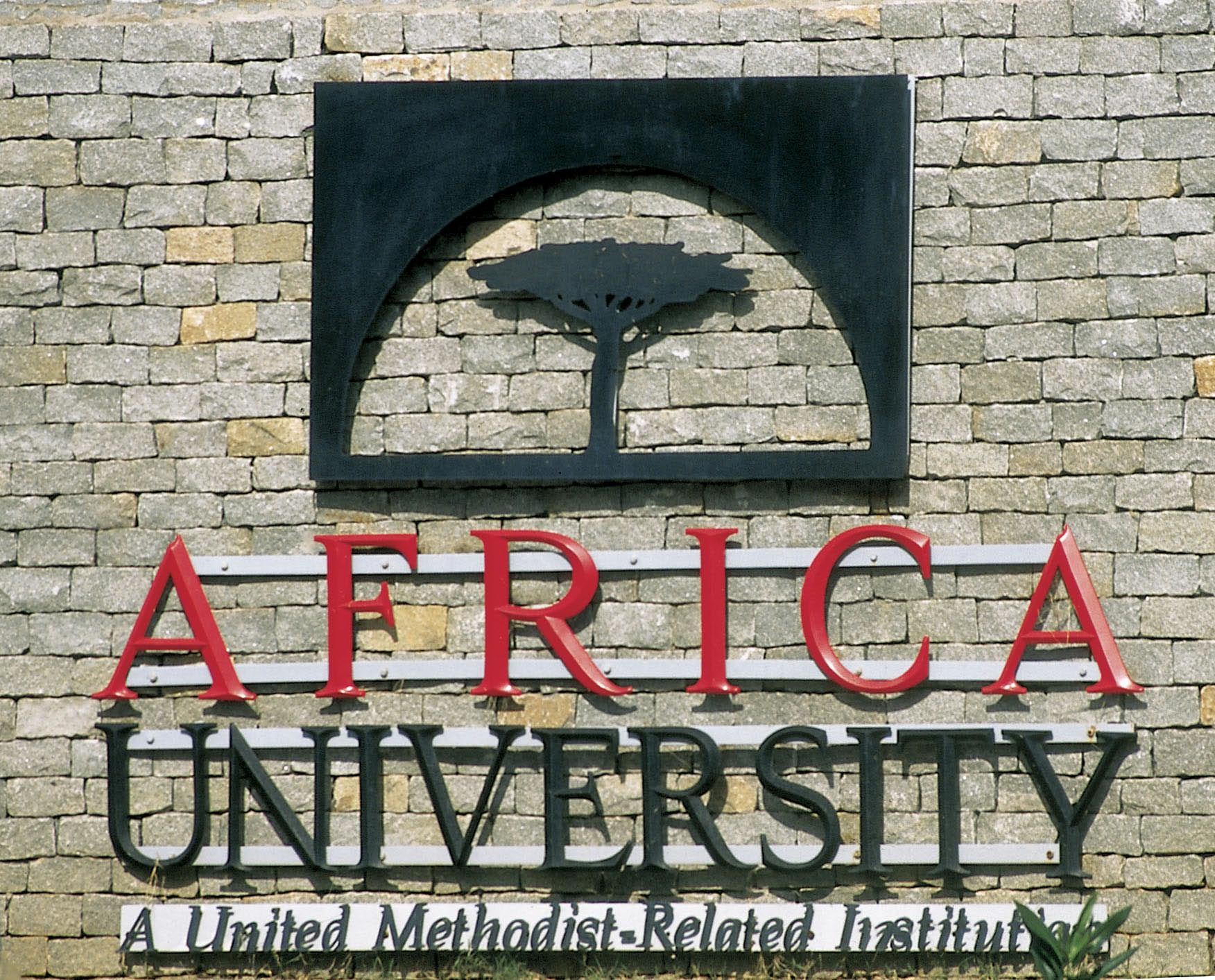

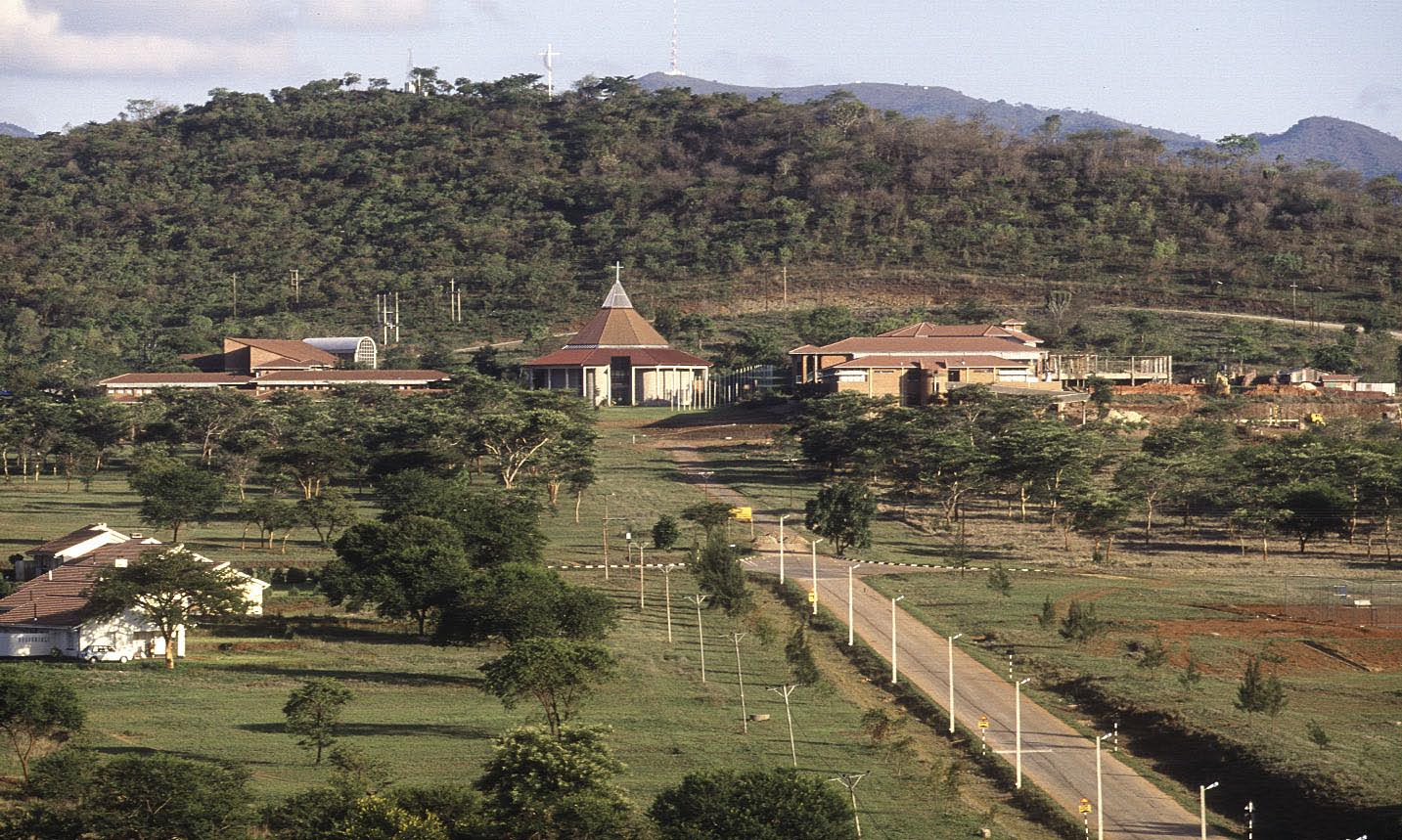
Africa University is a private, Pan-African university founded by the United Methodist Church. It hosts students from over 31 African nations and has 65 programs, 5 colleges, and 36 buildings. It is in Mutare, Zimbabwe. Pictured are the sign at the main entrance (above) and a picture of campus (below)

Throughout its history, the United Methodist Church has placed great emphasis on the importance of education. As such, the United Methodist Church established and is affiliated with around one hundred colleges and universities in the United States, including American University, Syracuse University, Boston University, Emory University, Duke University, Drew University, Otterbein University, University of Denver, University of Evansville, and Southern Methodist University. Most are members of the International Association of Methodist-related Schools, Colleges, and Universities. The church operates three hundred sixty schools and institutions overseas, notably Africa University in Zimbabwe.

There are 13 United Methodist seminaries. The United Methodist Church among Christian churches has a highly educated membership, with 37% of members holding graduate or post-graduate degrees. The church also claims a disproportionate share of high-income earners.

== Clergy ==
United Methodist clergy consist of elders, local pastors, associate members and deacons. They hold membership in the annual conference and not in the local church. Additionally provisional clergy hold membership in the annual conference while they are under appointment to a local church or extension ministry. There are several offices of ministry within the United Methodist Church.

Certified lay ministers may also be appointed to serve a church but under the supervision and direction of an elder.

=== History ===
The first Methodist clergy were ordained by John Wesley, a priest of the Church of England, because of the crisis caused by the American Revolution which isolated the Methodists in the States from the Church of England and its sacraments. Today, the clergy includes men and women who are ordained by bishops as elders and deacons and are appointed to various ministries. Elders in the United Methodist Church itinerate and are subject to the authority and appointment of their bishops. They generally serve as pastors in local congregations. Deacons are in service ministry and may serve as musicians, liturgists, educators, business administrators, and a number of other areas. Elders and deacons are required to obtain a master's degree (generally an M.Div.), or another equivalent degree, before commissioning and then ultimately ordination. Elders in full connection are each a member of their Annual Conference Order of Elders. Likewise each deacon in full connection is a member of their Annual Conference Order of Deacons.

=== Ordination of women ===
The Methodist Church has allowed ordination of women with full rights of clergy since 1956, when Maud K. Jensen was ordained and admitted into full connection in the Central Pennsylvania Annual Conference. This action was based upon its understanding of biblical principles. The United Methodist Church, along with some other Protestant churches, holds that when the historical contexts involved are understood, a coherent Biblical argument can be made in favor of women's ordination. In 1972, Jeanne Audrey Powers became the first woman to be nominated for the office of a bishop in The United Methodist Church.

==== Early Methodism ====
In 1761, John Wesley, the founder of Methodism allowed a woman to preach, Sarah Crosby. In 1771, when Crosby and Mary Bosanquet faced criticism for preaching, Mary Bosanquet wrote a letter to Wesley, which persuaded Wesley to approve women preaching in public, signing letters of endorsement, recognizing the “extraordinary call” some women had.

After John Wesley died in 1791, the church went through splits and was less favorable towards women preaching

==== The Methodist Church and its predecessors ====
Helenor M. Davisson was the first woman to be ordained as a Deacon in 1866 in the Methodist Protestant Church, the first woman to be ordained in any Methodist tradition. In the Methodist Episcopal Church, Margaret Newton Van Cott was the first woman to receive a local preacher’s license in 1869. In 1875, Pauline Williams Martindale was ordained as an Elder in the Methodist Protestant Church. In 1880, Anna Howard Shaw and Anna Oliver sought ordination from the Methodist Episcopal Church, but were denied, so they transferred to the Methodist Protestant Church where they were ordained. However, the Methodist Protestant Church ruled Anna Howard Shaw’s ordination was out of order in 1884. In 1920, the Methodist Episcopal Church granted women the right to be licensed as local preachers and in 1924, limited clergy rights as Elders and Deacons, but not conference members. The Methodist Episcopal Church, South, which split from the Methodist Episcopal Church over slavery, did not accept women’s ordination. In 1939, the Methodist Episcopal Church, the Methodist Protestant Church, and the Methodist Episcopal Church, South merged and formed the Methodist Church, one of the predecessors of the United Methodist Church. The Methodist Church granted full clergy rights to women in 1956.

==== The Evangelical United Brethren Church and its predecessors ====
One of the predecessors of the United Methodist Church, the Evangelical Church (not to be confused with modern Evangelicalism), discouraged women’s ordination. Another predecessor, the Church of the United Brethren in Christ (New Constitution), granted a preaching license to Charity Opheral in 1849, but later passed a resolution against women preaching in 1857. The United Brethren Church began ordaining women in 1889. Ella Niswonger was the first woman ordained in the United Brethren Church. In 1904, Minnie Jackson Goins became the first African American woman ordained as an elder in the United Brethren Church. However, when the Evangelical Church and the United Brethren Church united in 1946 as the Evangelical United Brethren Church, women were denied ordination.

==== The United Methodist Church ====
In 1968, the Methodist Church and the Evangelical United Brethren Church merged, forming the United Methodist Church. The United Methodist Church has affirmed full clergy rights for women since its creation.

Milestones for women’s ordination in the United Methodist Church include but are not limited to

- 1956 Maud Keister Jensen, first to receive full clergy rights
- 1956 Emma P. Hill, first African American woman ordained
- 1958 Antonia Wladar, first woman ordained as an Elder in Europe
- 1961 Julia Torres Fernandez becomes the first Hispanic woman ordained as an Elder in the Methodist Church
- 1971 Cornelia Mauyao becomes the first woman ordained as an elder in the Philippines
- 1976 Rev. Tomila Louise transitions to female and her ordination papers are changed to reflect her new name shortly before retiring
- 1979 Mutombo Illunga Kimba (of Congo) becomes the first African woman ordained as an elder
- 1980 Marjorie Matthews becomes the first woman elected Bishop in the United Methodist Church
- 1982 Mamie Ming Yan Ko and Mochie Lam become the first Chinese American women ordained as elders in the UMC
- 1983 Colleen Kyung Seen Chun becomes the first Korean American woman ordained as an elder
- 1984 Leontine T.C. Kelly becomes the first African American woman elected Bishop
- 1989 Lois V. Glory-Neal (Cherokee Nation) becomes the first Native American woman ordained as an Elder.
- 1992 Ana Moala Tiueti becomes the first native Tongan woman to be ordained as an Elder in the US and world
- 2002 Bishop Sharon Brown Christopher becomes the first woman to serve as the President of the Council of Bishops
- 2003 Linita Uluave Moa becomes the first Tongan woman ordained as an Elder
- 2004 Minerva G. Carcaño is elected the first Latina Bishop
- 2005 Rosemarie J. Wenner is elected the first European woman Bishop
- 2008 Joaquina Filipe Nhanala (of Mozambique) is the first African woman elected Bishop
- 2016 Mao Her becomes the first Hmong woman ordained as an Elder in the UMC (later switched to the GMC)
- 2016 Karen Oliveto is elected the first Lesbian Bishop in the United Methodist Church
- 2020 Bishop Cynthia Fierro Harvey becomes President of the Council of Bishops, the first Latina in the position
- 2024 Bishop Tracy Smith Malone becomes President of the Council of Bishops, the first Black woman in the position

=== Bishop ===
All clergy appointments are made and fixed annually by the resident bishop on the advice of the Annual Conference Cabinet, which is composed of the Area Provost/Dean (if one is appointed) and the several district superintendents of the districts of the Annual Conference. Until the bishop has read the appointments at the session of the Annual Conference, no appointments are officially fixed. Many Annual Conferences try to avoid making appointment changes between sessions of Annual Conference. While an appointment is made one year at a time, it is most common for an appointment to be continued for multiple years. Appointment tenures in extension ministries, such as military chaplaincy, campus ministry, missions, higher education and other ministries beyond the local church are often even longer.

=== Elder ===
Elders are called by God, affirmed by the church, and ordained by a bishop to a ministry of Word, Sacrament, Order and Service within the church. They may be appointed to the local church, or to other valid extension ministries of the church. Elders are given the authority to preach the Word of God, administer the sacraments of the church, to provide care and counseling, and to order the life of the church for ministry and mission. Elders may also be appointed to extension ministry to serve as district superintendents, and they are eligible for election to the episcopacy. Elders serve a term of two–three years as provisional elders prior to their ordination.

=== Deacon ===
Deacons are called by God, affirmed by the church, and ordained by a bishop to servant leadership within the church.They are ordained to ministries of word, service, compassion, and justice. They may be appointed to ministry within the local church or to an extension ministry that supports the mission of the church. Deacons give leadership, preach the Word, contribute in worship, conduct marriages, bury the dead, and aid the church in embodying its mission within the world. Deacons assist elders in the sacraments of Holy Communion and Baptism, and may be granted sacramental authority if they are appointed as the pastor in a local church or as their extension ministry requires, upon approval of the bishop. Deacons serve a term of 2–3 years as provisional deacons prior to their ordination.

=== Provisional clergy ===
At the 1996 General Conference, the ordination order of transitional deacon was abolished. This created new orders known as "provisional elder" or "provisional deacon" for those who seek to be ordained in the respective orders. The provisional elder/deacon is a seminary graduate who serves at least two years in full-time appointments after being commissioned. During this period, the provisional elder may be granted sacramental ministry in their local appointment. For the first time in its history non-ordained pastors became a normal expectation, rather than an extraordinary provision for ministry.

=== Local pastors ===
Local pastors in the United Methodist Church are individuals who are affirmed by the church and appointed by a bishop to serve in a ministry of Word, Sacrament, Order, and Service within the church. The official title for these individuals is "licensed local pastor." Although they are not ordained, they are granted the authority to preach the Word of God, administer the sacraments, provide pastoral care and counseling, and lead the congregation in its ministry and mission.

A bishop may appoint a licensed local pastor to serve a church when an ordained elder is unavailable, either because of a shortage of clergy or due to the financial hardship of a pastoral charge. Local pastors often serve in bi-vocational roles, fulfilling their ministerial calling both within the church and in their secular employment.

Licensed local pastors, whether appointed full-time or part-time, are considered clergy. They hold membership in the annual conference rather than in the local church. Their authority to serve as pastors is limited to the specific church to which they are appointed and is valid only for the duration of that appointment. This authority does not extend beyond the assigned context or continue after the appointment ends. In their appointed church, they preach, conduct worship, and carry out the regular responsibilities of a pastor, but only under certain conditions and times agreed upon. While they are not required to hold advanced theological degrees, they must complete a licensing school and continue their education. This may be accomplished by completing an approved Course of Study at a United Methodist seminary or Course of Study school, or by enrolling in a Master of Divinity program at an approved United Methodist seminary.

Licensed local pastors who wish to continue toward associate membership in the annual conference must successfully complete written and oral examinations, appear before the District Committee on Ministry and the Conference Board of Ordained Ministry, and meet certain age and service requirements as defined by their conference. They may also pursue ordination if they complete a bachelor's degree and fulfill additional requirements set by their Conference Board of Ordained Ministry. These typically include completing an advanced Course of Study or the required seminary coursework at an approved institution.

When a licensed local pastor retires or is no longer appointed to a local church, they return to lay membership in a charge conference.

== Laity ==
There are two classes of lay membership in the UMC: Baptized Members and Professing Members.

The United Methodist Church (UMC) practices infant and adult baptism. Baptized Members are those who have been baptized as an infant or child, but who have not subsequently professed their own faith. These Baptized Members become Professing Members through confirmation and sometimes the profession of faith. Individuals who were not previously baptized are baptized as part of their profession of faith and thus become Professing Members in this manner. Individuals may also become a Professing Member through transfer from another Christian denomination.

Unlike confirmation and profession of faith, Baptism is a sacrament in the UMC. The Book of Discipline of the United Methodist Church directs the local church to offer membership preparation or confirmation classes to all people, including adults. The term confirmation is generally reserved for youth, while some variation on membership class is generally used for adults wishing to join the church. The Book of Discipline normally allows any youth at least completing sixth grade to participate, although the pastor has discretionary authority to allow a younger person to participate. In confirmation and membership preparation classes, students learn about Church and the Methodist-Christian theological tradition in order to profess their ultimate faith in Christ.

Lay members are extremely important in the UMC. The Professing Members are part of all major decisions in the church. General, Jurisdictional, Central, and Annual Conferences are all required to have an equal number of laity and clergy.

In a local church, many decisions are made by an administrative board or council. This council is made up of laity representing various other organizations within the local church. The elder or local pastor sits on the council as a voting member.

Additionally, Laity may serve the church in several distinct roles including:

=== Lay servant ===
Another position in the United Methodist Church is that of the lay servant. Although not considered clergy, lay servants often preach during services of worship when an ordained elder, Local Pastor, Associate Member or deacon is unavailable. There are two categories of lay servants: local church lay servant, who serve in and through their local churches, and certified lay servants, who serve in their own churches, in other churches, and through district or conference projects and programs. To be recognized as local church lay servant, they must be recommended by their pastor and Church Council or Charge Conference, and complete the basic course for lay servant. Each year they must reapply, reporting how they have served and continued to learn during that year. To be recognized as certified lay servant, they must be recommended by their pastor and Church Council or Charge Conference, complete the basic course and one advanced lay servant course, and be interviewed by the District or Conference Committee on Lay Speaking. They must report and reapply annually; and they must complete at least one advanced course every three years.

=== Certified lay ministers ===
The 2004 General Conference created another class of ministry, the certified lay minister (CLM). CLMs are not considered clergy but instead remain lay members of the United Methodist Church. A Certified Lay Minister (CLM) is a qualified United Methodist layperson called to congregational leadership as part of a ministry team under the supervision an ordained minister. Paragraph 271 in the 2012 Book of Discipline explains Certified Lay Ministry, requirements, and service distinction.

A person wishing to become a CLM enters the certification process, which includes training, support, supervision, and accountability to the District Committee on Ordained Ministry. CLMs are laypeople serving out their call as disciples of Jesus Christ.

=== Deaconesses and Home Missioners ===
Deaconesses and Home Missioners are an order of laity “called by God to a lifetime relationship in The United Methodist Church for engagement with a full-time vocation in ministries of love, justice and service.” Deaconesses and Home Missioners form a “covenant community that is rooted in Scripture, informed by history, driven by mission, ecumenical in scope and global in outreach.” The Book of Discipline says that Deaconesses and Home Missioners strive to “alleviate suffering; eradicate causes of injustice and all that robs life of dignity and worth; facilitate the development of full human potential; and share in building global community through the church universal.” In the United Methodist Church, Deaconesses are not female Deacons but are a separate order from Deacons (both of which are inclusive of all genders, like all orders in the UMC) (Deacons are also a clergy order). Deaconesses and Home Missioners are the same order but Home Missioner is a non-gendered title sometimes taken by men and others in the office. Deaconesses and Home Missioners are laity and many professions and occupations are represented in the Order.

== Ecumenical relations ==
Methodism is one tradition within the Christian Church. The United Methodist Church is active in ecumenical relations with other Christian groups and denominations. It is a member of the National Council of Churches, the World Council of Churches, Churches Uniting in Christ, and Christian Churches Together. In addition, it voted to seek observer status in the National Association of Evangelicals and in the World Evangelical Fellowship. However, there are some in the United Methodist Church who feel that false ecumenism might result in the "blurring of theological and confessional differences in the interests of unity."

In April 2005, the United Methodist Council of Bishops approved "A Proposal for Interim Eucharistic Sharing." This document was the first step toward full communion with the Evangelical Lutheran Church in America (ELCA). The ELCA approved this same document in August 2005. At the 2008 General Conference, the United Methodist Church approved full communion with the Evangelical Lutheran Church in America. The ELCA approved this document on August 20, 2009, at its annual churchwide assembly.

The United Methodist Church has since 1985 been exploring a possible merger with three historically African-American Methodist denominations: the African Methodist Episcopal Church, the African Methodist Episcopal Zion Church, and the Christian Methodist Episcopal Church. A Commission on Pan Methodist Cooperation and Union formed in 2000 to carry out work on such a merger. In May 2012, The United Methodist Church entered into full communion with the African Methodist Episcopal Church, African Methodist Episcopal Zion Church, African Union Methodist Protestant Church, Christian Methodist Episcopal Church, and Union American Methodist Episcopal Church, in which these Churches agreed to "recognize each other's churches, share sacraments, and affirm their clergy and ministries."

There are also a number of churches such as the Evangelical Methodist Church in Argentina, Evangelical Church of Uruguay, and Methodist Church in India (MCI), that are "autonomous affiliated" churches in relation to the United Methodist Church.

The UMC is a member of the Wesleyan Holiness Consortium, which seeks to reconceive and promote Biblical holiness in today's Church, and many United Methodist congregations are members of the Christian Holiness Partnership, with ten percent of local church membership in the Christian Holiness Partnership being from the United Methodist connection. It is also active in the World Methodist Council, an interdenominational group composed of various churches in the tradition of John Wesley to promote the Gospel throughout the world. On July 18, 2006, delegates to the World Methodist Council voted unanimously to adopt the "Joint Declaration on the Doctrine of Justification", which was approved in 1999 by the Vatican and the Lutheran World Federation.

=== Full Communion ===
The United Methodist Church is in full communion with the Evangelical Lutheran Church in America; the Moravian Church in North America (Northern and Southern Provinces); Pan-Methodist Churches which include The African Methodist Episcopal Church, The African Methodist Episcopal Zion Church, The African Union Methodist Protestant Church, The Christian Methodist Episcopal Church, The Union American Methodist Episcopal Church; and the Uniting Church in Sweden. The United Methodist Church also has a large number of churches in partnerships in "formal, ecumenical relationships approved by the General Conference" which are categorized as Concordat Churches, Affiliated Autonomous Churches, Affiliated United Churches, and Known Ecumenical Partner Churches Specific to European Central Conferences. While not using the exact wording, these relationships are closely akin to full communion, and include the Methodist Church of Great Britain and the United Church of Canada.

The United Methodist Church approved full communion with the Episcopal Church at its Annual Conference on April 30, 2024. The agreement is awaiting approval by the Episcopal Church, which is not expected until 2027. Both churches are already in full communion with the Evangelical Lutheran Church in America and the Moravian Church in North America (Northern and Southern Provinces).

In 1987, it signed an altar and pulpit fellowship agreement with the Evangelical Church in Germany. Its Swiss branch is a member of the Protestant Church of Switzerland.

== Membership trends ==
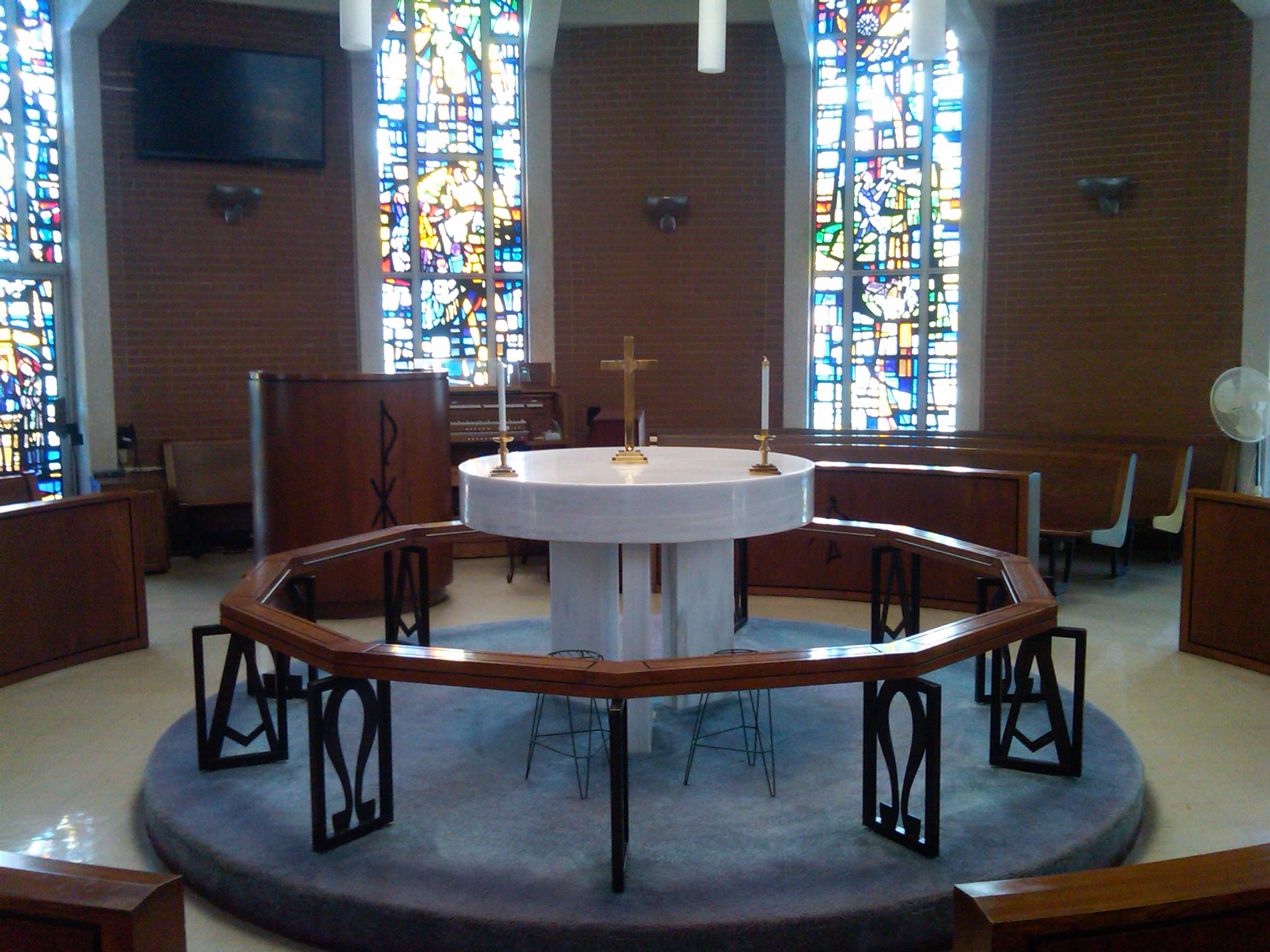
A United Methodist chapel in Kent, Ohio, near the main campus of Kent State University

Like many other mainline Protestant denominations in the United States, the United Methodist Church has experienced significant membership losses in recent decades. At the time of its formation, the UMC had about 11 million members in nearly 42,000 congregations. In 1975, membership dropped below 10 million for the first time. In 2005, there were about 8 million members in over 34,000 congregations. Membership is concentrated primarily in the Midwest and in the South. Texas has the largest number of members, with about 1 million. The states with the highest membership rates are Oklahoma, Iowa, Mississippi, West Virginia, and North Carolina.

By the opening of the 2008 General Conference, total UMC membership was estimated at 11.4 million, with about 7.9 million in the US and 3.5 million overseas. Significantly, about 20 percent of the conference delegates were from Africa, with Filipinos and Europeans making up another 10 percent. During the conference, the delegates voted to finalize the induction of the Methodist Church of the Ivory Coast and its 700,000 members into the denomination. Given current trends in the UMC—with overseas churches growing, especially in Africa, and US churches collectively losing about 1,000 members a week—it was estimated that Africans would make up at least 30 percent of the delegates at the 2012 General Conference, and was also possible that 40 percent of the delegates will be from outside the US. One Congolese bishop has estimated that typical Sunday attendance of the UMC is higher in his country than in the entire United States.

In 2018, outside of the United States, it had 6,464,127 members and 12,866 churches.

In 2020, it had 6,268,310 members and 30,543 churches in the United States.

In 2024, the number decreased to 3,988,810 professing members (members who are baptized and have made a profession of faith), 257,502 baptized members (non-professing), and 794,307 constituent members (members who are not baptized) in the United States, as divisions grew over church policy regarding homosexuality and the Global Methodist Church was formed in the prior year. The drop to 4.2 million members in 2023 represented a loss of approximately 1.2 million members, or about 22% of the previous years' total - the biggest loss that any denomination has ever lost in a single year in American religious history. Much of this decrease (but not all) was because of exiting congregation, wishing to leave the UMC with their property. In 2023, 5,595 UMC congregations chose to disaffiliate. In total, from 2019 to 2023, approximately 25% of the American UMC churches disaffiliated, 7,673 in total. In 2025, the UMC reported 3,809,543 professing members, 236,885 baptized members (non-professing), and 741,595 constituent members in the United States. The UMC reported 11,299,000 members worldwide at the end of 2025.

== Churchwide giving ==
Contributions to the local church not only benefit the local congregation, but also have regional, national, and international impact through the United Methodist Church's connectional giving system. The power of this collective giving enables the church to educate clergy, encourage cooperation with other faith communions, fund General Conference, nurture historically black colleges and Africa University, and support bishops.

Individuals may also choose to give to the church by naming the Permanent Fund for the United Methodist Church as beneficiary in their estate plans. The Permanent Fund provides a permanent source of funding for the ministries of the United Methodist Church.

== See also ==
- List of the largest Protestant bodies
- Conferences of the United Methodist Church
- Confessing Movement
- Holiness Movement
- Reconciling Ministries Network
- List of local Methodist churches
- Christianity in the United States
- Category:Methodism
- Category:Methodist church buildings
- Category:Methodist organizations
- Category:Universities and colleges affiliated with the United Methodist Church
