= General Board of Church and Society =

- Abbreviation: GBCS
- Predecessor: Methodist Board of Temperance, Prohibition, and Public Morals
- Type: Agency of the United Methodist Church
- Headquarters: Washington, DC; New York, NY
- President: Bishop Robert Hoshibata
- Parent organization: United Methodist Church
- Website: umc-gbcs.org

The General Board of Church and Society (GBCS) is a general agency of the United Methodist Church. It is one of four international general program boards of The United Methodist Church as set out the UMC Book of Discipline. The General Board has headquarters on Capitol Hill in Washington, D.C., and at the Interchurch Center in New York City. There are five divisions within the GBCS: Public Witness and Advocacy, Administration, Ministry of Resourcing Congregational Life, United Nations Ministry and Communications.

== Purpose ==
According to the 2004 Book of Discipline, the GBCS's purpose is thus stated:

1002. Purpose – The purpose of the board shall be to relate the gospel of Jesus Christ to the members of the Church and to the persons and structures of the communities and world in which they live. It shall seek to bring the whole of human life, activities, possessions, use of resources, and community and world relationships into conformity with the will of God. It shall show the members of the Church and the society that the reconciliation that God effected through Christ involves personal, social, and civic righteousness.

== Spheres of Influence ==
There are six stated spheres of influence for the GBCS

1. The Natural World
2. The Nurturing Community
3. The Social Community
4. The Economic Community
5. The Political Community
6. The World Community

== Social Issues ==
The GBCS was traditionally pro-choice and supportive of the Religious Coalition for Reproductive Choice. In 2008, this was affirmed by the General Conference, but, in 2016, it voted in favor of withdrawing the United Methodist Church from the pro-choice organization. The GBCS remains supportive of legal abortion in certain circumstances stating "the General Board of Church and Society continues to be an advocate for a full range of safe and legal reproductive health care – including, in certain cases, the option to safely and legally end a pregnancy."

On human sexuality, the GBCS opposes discrimination or prejudice against people based on sexual orientation. In 2013, the organization allowed its building, in Washington D.C., to be used by supporters of same-gender marriage.

In 2019, the GBCS joined with 42 other religious and allied organizations in issuing a statement opposing Project Blitz, an effort by a coalition of Christian right organizations to influence state legislation.
