= Wespath Benefits and Investments =

Non-profit agency of the United Methodist Church

- Abbreviation: Wespath
- Formation: 1908; 118 years ago
- Type: Non-profit pension fund
- Location: Glenview, Illinois, United States
- CEO: Andrew Hendren
- Subsidiaries: Wespath Institutional Investments
- Affiliations: United Methodist Church
- Website: wespath.org
- Formerly called: General Board of Pension and Health Benefits

Wespath Benefits and Investments (formerly known as General Board of Pension and Health Benefits) is an American non-profit pension agency affiliated with the United Methodist Church. Wespath supervises and administers retirement plans, investment funds, health and welfare benefit plans for active and retired clergy and lay employees of the Church. In accordance with its fiduciary duties, Wespath administers benefit plans and invests using Christian finance principles.

As of 2018, it held approximately $28 billion in assets for over 100,000 participants and over 120 United Methodist-affiliated institutions.

== History ==
Established in 1908 its current head office is in Glenview, Illinois.

== Sustainable Investment ==
Wespath follows the United Nations Guiding Principles on Business and Human Rights for socially responsible investing.

It identifies several countries as having "prolonged and systematic patterns of human rights violations," including the Central African Republic, Israel, North Korea, and Saudi Arabia. A total of 44 companies are excluded from its investment funds including all of Israel's major banks. The board also excludes a further nine companies due to their contribution to global warming.
