= Maud Jensen =

American Methodist missionary

Maud Jensen (née Keister; 1904 - October 12, 1998) was a missionary and the first woman to receive full clergy rights in the Methodist Church in the United States.

== Early life and education ==
Maud Keister was from New Cumberland, Pennsylvania. She graduated from Bucknell University in Lewisburg, Pennsylvania in 1926. She was the first and only female to attend the school. As the decision was not popular to allow women in to study, she did not receive much welcome from her peers. She, as her own recorded oral history at Drew University reveals, decided the only way to counter this was to best her classmates in every class. She did and graduated at the top of her class.

She married Rev. Anders Kristian Jensen, whom she met while they were both applying for the Korean missionary job in New York City, in 1928. She got the job, and their brief meeting made an impact. They corresponded until they became engaged and married. He joined her and her missionary work in South Korea. They had two children, Clair Lee and Philip. Maud's husband, Kris, was taken as a civilian POW at the beginning of the Korean Conflict/War north of Seoul. He was held prisoner by North Korea for nearly 4 years. Maud and Kris later returned to continue their missionary work. Maud was twice honored by the South Korean government for her humanitarian works.

== Career ==
Jensen did missionary work in Korea for forty years. Jensen taught at the Methodist Theological Seminary in Korea.

She earned a Bachelor of Divinity degree from the Drew University Theological School in Madison, New Jersey in 1946. She applied to be ordained clergy in the Methodist New Jersey Conference but the Bishop would not approve her. A bishop in the Central Pennsylvania Conference approve her for local clergy ordination in 1952.

When the Methodist Church voted to allow women to have full clergy rights in 1956, Jensen was given temporary full clergy rights for two years, and obtained permanent clergy status in 1958.

== Later life ==
Jensen received her doctorate from Drew Theological School at the age of 74. She died on October 12, 1998, in Madison, New Jersey.
