= Book of Discipline (United Methodist) =

Law and doctrine of the United Methodist Church

The Book of Discipline constitutes the law and doctrine of the United Methodist Church. It follows similar works for its predecessor denominations. It was originally published in 1784, in the Methodist Episcopal Church, as “Minutes of Several Conversations Between The Rev. Thomas Coke, The Rev. Francis Asbury and Others … Composing a Form of Discipline for the Ministers, Preachers and other Members of the Methodist Episcopal Church in America.” and has been published every four years (commencing after 2 revisions in 1786 and 1792) thereafter following the meeting of the General Conference, which passes legislation that is included in the Book of Discipline. The most recent edition is that of 2020/2024. The book is considered “the most current statement of how United Methodists agree to live their lives together and ‘maintain the unity of the Spirit in the bond of peace.’” (2016 Book of Discipline, Episcopal Greetings).

The basic unit of reference is the paragraph, not the page, chapter or section. The paragraphs are numbered consecutively within each chapter or section, but numbers are skipped between chapters or sections. The paragraph is often only a few lines, but many are several pages long and they can be divided into multiple subdivisions. Paragraphs are first divided using Arabic numerals (1, 2, 3,...) which can themselves be divided by italicized lower case letters with parentheses (a), b), c), d)...) which may be divided using Arabic numerals within double parentheses ((1), (2), (3)...)

Traditionally a list of all the bishops with the year of their election is at the beginning of the book. That is followed by a brief history of the church, then the church constitution, and a statement concerning the doctrine and theology of the church. The Social Principles of the church follow. Finally the legislative section, by far the largest part of The Discipline, appears.

Originally it comprised 81 questions and answers, the Articles of Religion, The Sunday Service, and a collection of songs and hymns sent by John Wesley. Currently these are found in three volumes (The Book of Discipline of The United Methodist Church, The United Methodist Book of Worship, and The United Methodist Hymnal). In the late 19th century it shifted towards a legal manual of directives and structures.
