= List of Methodist denominations =

This is a list of Methodist denominations (or Methodist connexions). Those not affiliated with the World Methodist Council are marked with an asterisk (*).

This list includes some united and uniting churches with Methodist participation. Some denominations may not have an exclusively Wesleyan heritage.

== List ==
=== Africa ===
- African Methodist Church, West Africa
- African Methodist Church, Zimbabwe
- African Methodist Episcopal Church, Central Africa
- Bantu Methodist Church of Southern Africa
- Nigerian Methodist Church
- Methodist Church of Kenya (MCK)
- Methodist Church Ghana
- Methodist Church of Southern Africa
- Methodist Church in Zimbabwe
- Methodist Church in Togo
- Protestant Methodist Church in Benin
- Protestant Methodist Church in Côte d’Ivoire
- United Church in Zambia
- United Methodist Church, Central Congo
- United Methodist Church in Sierra Leone
- United Methodist Church, South Congo

=== Asia ===
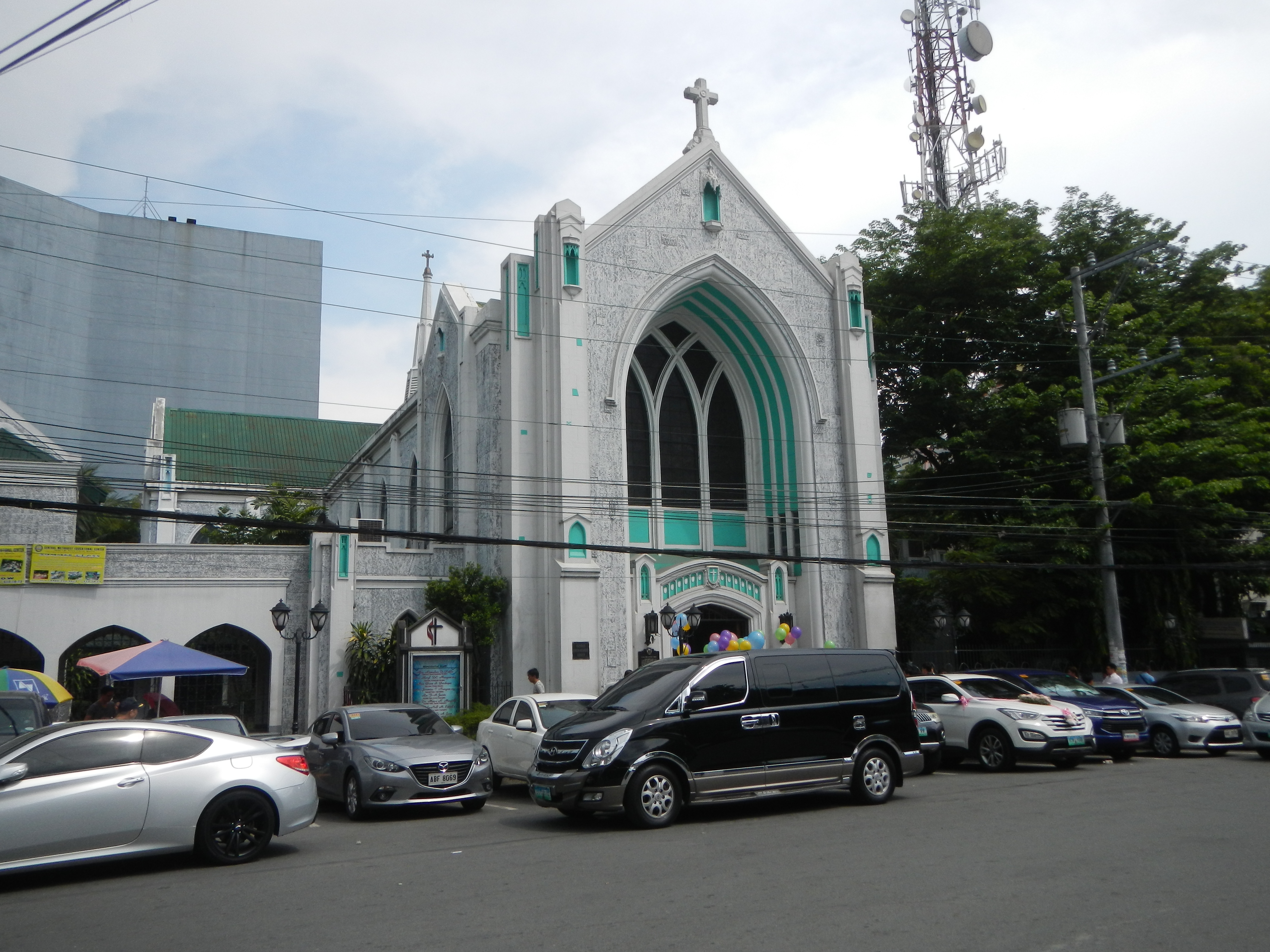
Central United Methodist Church, a parish church of the United Methodist Church in Manila.

- Church of North India
- Church of Pakistan, The
- Church of South India, Bangalore Episcopal Area
- Free Methodist Church, Japan
- Iglesia Evangelica Metodista en las Islas Filipinas
- Korean Methodist Church
- Methodist Church in Bangladesh
- Methodist Church of Hong Kong
- Methodist Church, Republic of China (Taiwan)
- Free Methodist Church, Taiwan
- Methodist Church in Sichuan, Qing and Republican China
- Methodist Church in India
- Methodist Church in Indonesia
- Methodist Church in Singapore
- Methodist Church in Malaysia
- Methodist Church, Lower Myanmar
- Methodist Church, Upper Myanmar
- Methodist Church in Sri Lanka

=== Caribbean ===
- Methodist Church in Cuba
- Evangelical Church of the Dominican Republic
- Methodist Church in the Caribbean and the Americas
- Methodist Church, Bahamas Conference of the (BCMC)
- Methodist Church in Puerto Rico
- United Church of Canada, Bermuda

=== Europe ===
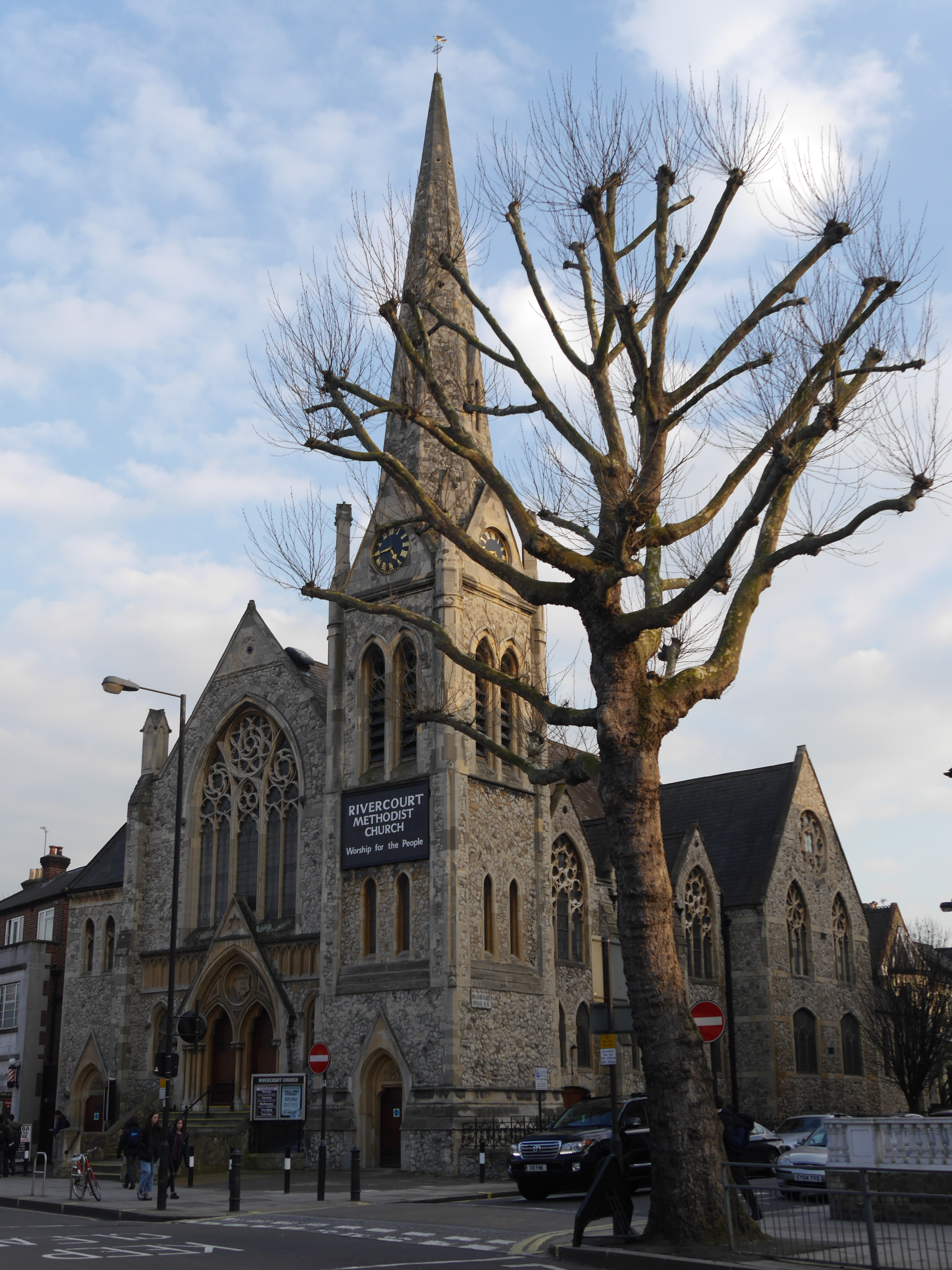
The Rivercourt Methodist Church in London, a local church of the Methodist Church of Great Britain

- Estonian Methodist Church
- Evangelical Methodist Church in Portugal
- Fellowship of Independent Methodist Churches
- Independent Methodist Connexion
- Methodist Church in Ireland
- Methodist Evangelical Church in Italy
- Methodist Church of Great Britain
- Spain
  - Iglesia Evangélica Metodista Libre (España)
  - Iglesia Evangélica Metodista Unida (España)
  - Iglesia Evangélica Metodista (España)
- Uniting Church in Sweden
- United Methodist Church, European regional conferences
  - Central and Southern Europe Central Conference
    - United Methodist Church in Austria
    - United Methodist Church in Bulgaria
    - United Methodist Church in Hungary
  - Northern Europe Central Conference of the United Methodist Church
    - United Methodist Church in Norway
    - United Methodist Church in Denmark
    - United Methodist Church in Latvia
    - United Methodist Church in Lithuania
    - United Methodist Church in Germany
    - United Methodist Church in Russia
  - Union of Evangelical Methodist Churches of France
- United Protestant Church in Belgium
- Wesleyan Reform Union

=== North America ===
(see also chart below)

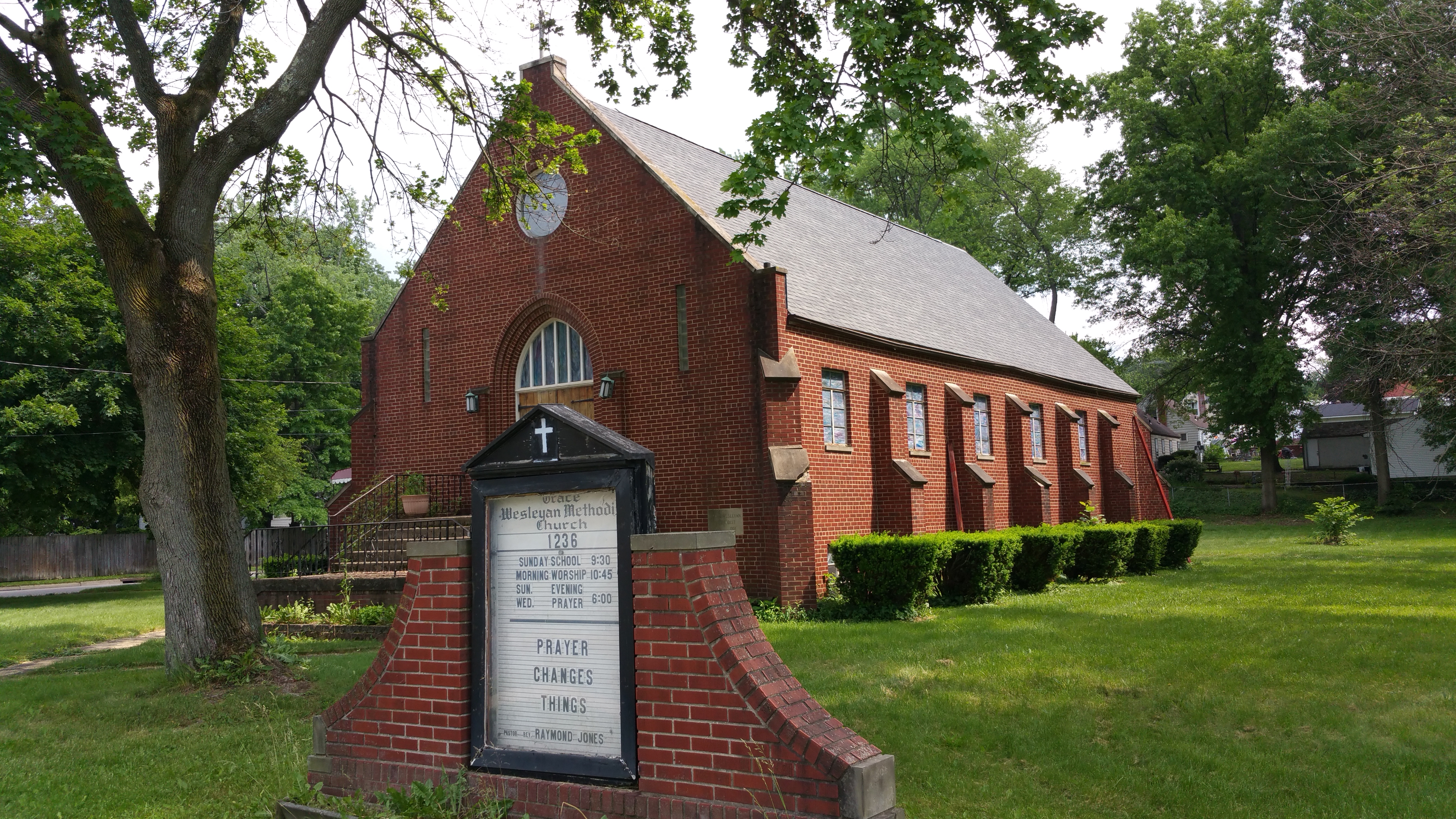
A parish church of the Allegheny Wesleyan Methodist Connection, one of the largest denominations in the conservative holiness movement.

- African Methodist Episcopal Church
- African Methodist Episcopal Zion Church
- African Union Methodist Protestant Church*
- Allegheny Wesleyan Methodist Connection*
- Association of Independent Methodists*
- Bethel Methodist Church*
- Bible Methodist Connection of Churches*
- Bible Missionary Church*
- British Methodist Episcopal Church
- Christian Methodist Episcopal Church
- Christ's Sanctified Holy Church*
- Church of the Nazarene
- Congregational Methodist Church*
- Emmanuel Association of Churches*
- Evangelical Methodist Church of America*
- Evangelical Methodist Church*
- Evangelical Methodist Church Conference*
- Evangelical Wesleyan Church*
- First Congregational Methodist Church*
- Free Methodist Church, The - North America
  - Free Methodist Church in Canada
- Fundamental Methodist Conference*
- Global Methodist Church*
- Immanuel Missionary Church*
- Lumber River Conference of the Holiness Methodist Church*
- Methodist Church of Mexico
- Methodist Protestant Church*
- Missionary Methodist Church*
- National Association of Wesleyan Evangelicals*
- New Methodist Conference*
- Pillar of Fire Church*
- Primitive Methodist Church*
- Reformed Zion Union Apostolic Church*
- Southern Congregational Methodist Church*
- Southern Methodist Church*
- Union American Methodist Episcopal Church*
- United Church of Canada
- United Methodist Church, United States
- Wesleyan Church

* = not a part of the World Methodist Council

=== South America ===
- Evangelical Methodist Church in Argentina
- Evangelical Methodist Church in Bolivia
- Evangelical Methodist Church in Costa Rica
- Evangelical Methodist Church in Panama
- Evangelical Methodist Community - Paraguay
- Free Methodist Church
- Methodist Church in Brazil
- Methodist Church in Chile
- Methodist Church in Colombia
- Methodist Church in Peru
- Methodist Church in Uruguay
- United Evangelical Methodist Church of Ecuador.

=== Oceania ===
- Chinese Methodist Church in Australia
- Free Wesleyan Church, Tonga
- Methodist Church of Fiji and Rotuma
- Methodist Church of New Zealand
- Uniting Church in Australia
- United Church in Papua New Guinea

== North American church chart ==
Splits and mergers of North American Methodist churches

MEC (1784)
AME (1816)
AMEZ (1821)
MPC (1828)
WMC (1841)
North (1845)	South (1845)
CMC (1852)
FMC (1860)
CMEC (1870)
PHC (1897)
PMC (1938)
MC (1939)
SMC (1940)
EMC (1945)
UHC (1955)
EMC (1962)
EWC (1963)
BMCC (1967)
EUB
AWMC (1968)	WC (1968)	UMC (1968)
BMCC (1994)
GMC (2022)

== See also ==
- List of Methodist churches - local churches of notability
- History of Methodism in the United States
- List of Christian denominations
