= Elder (Methodist) =

Methodist church ordained minister

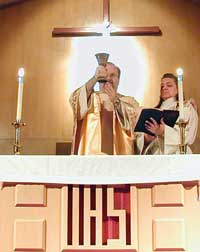
A United Methodist elder and deacon at a service of worship.

An elder, in many Methodist churches, is an ordained minister that has the responsibilities to preach and teach, preside at the celebration of the sacraments, administer the church through pastoral guidance, and lead the congregations under their care in service ministry to the world.

The office of elder, then, is what most people tend to think of as the pastoral, priestly, clergy office within the church. In some of the denominations within Methodism that use the title, ordination to this office is open to both men and women, including the Global Methodist Church, United Methodist Church, Free Methodist Church, Bible Methodist Connection of Churches, and Evangelical Methodist Church. In other denominations such as the Primitive Methodist Church, Evangelical Methodist Church of America, Fundamental Methodist Conference, Evangelical Wesleyan Church, and Southern Methodist Church, only men are ordained as elders.

Methodist denominations that have "a threefold ministry of deacons, elders, and bishops" include the African Methodist Episcopal Church, Christian Methodist Episcopal Church, Free Methodist Church and the United Methodist Church, among other denominations represented in the World Methodist Council.

== Etymology and origin ==
"Elder" is an English translation of the Greek word Presbuteros (Greek: πρεσβύτερος), found in the New Testament. The word is also commonly transliterated as "presbyter". The office or "order" of presbyter is one of three orders of the traditional Christian priesthood, along with deacon and bishop. The founder of Methodism, John Wesley, in the ordination rite, supplanted the Book of Common Prayer's term "priest" for "elder", although the rest of the liturgy remained the same.

== Denominational statements ==
=== Allegheny Wesleyan Methodist Connection ===
The Discipline of the Allegheny Wesleyan Methodist Connection states that:

An elder is a preacher of the gospel, fully invested with all the functions of the Christian ministry. An elder is constituted such by election of the Connection, and by the laying on of the hands of some of the elders, and prayer. The president of the Connection shall lead the service unless the Connection orders otherwise and appoints some other person in his stead. ... It is the duty of an elder to preach the gospel, to administer baptism and the Lord’s Supper, to perform all parts of divine worship, and to solemnize the rite of matrimony.

=== Free Methodist Church ===
The Book of Discipline of the Free Methodist Church states that:

Election to elder’s orders constitutes the acknowledgement of the annual conference that the person so elected has met all the biblical (1 Timothy 3, Titus 1) and ecclesiastical requirements to serve as an overseer in the church. Only an ordained elder may serve as a ministerial delegate to General Conference, a conference superintendent or a bishop.

=== Primitive Methodist Church ===
The Discipline of the Primitive Methodist Church states that:

An Elder shall have met all the requirements of the School of Theology and the Conference, and shall have received the rite of ordination. He shall have the full rights and privileges of the Conference and shall be entitled to participate in the system of itinerancy.

=== United Methodist Church ===
The Book of Discipline of the United Methodist Church states that:

Elders are ministers who have completed their formal preparation for the ministry of Word, Sacrament, and Order; have been elected itinerant members in full connection with an Annual Conference; and have been ordained elders in accordance with the Order and Discipline of The United Methodist Church.

== Vestments and clericals ==
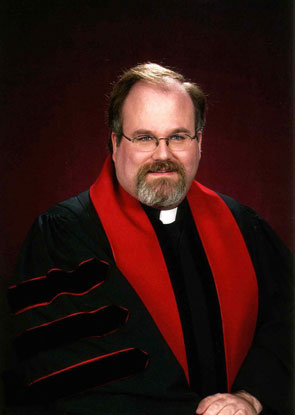
A Methodist Elder ready to preside at a Worship Service, wearing the clerical collar, stole, and pulpit robe.

While not presiding at a service of worship, Methodist elders are sometimes seen wearing the clerical collar and clergy shirt in public. Preaching tabs can also be worn around the neck in lieu of the clerical collar. Many Methodist elders choose not to wear clerical clothing in their daily activities.

When presiding at a service of worship, Methodist elders are often seen wearing church vestments, namely the pulpit robe or alb, and to a lesser extent, the chasuble. Stoles that reflect the season of the Christian year are worn over the vestment. Other elders choose not to wear vestments and are often seen in suits, dress clothes or casual clothing. However, stoles which represent the "yoke" of responsibility to the Church and to God are not to be worn unless the person has gone through the process of ordination which extends past education to a provisionary period culminating with a formal ordination service where the bishop presides.

== Educational requirements ==
In most cases, United Methodist elders must have graduated with a Bachelor of Arts in liberal education or equivalent degree in a college or university listed by the University Senate of the United Methodist Church and must have a Master of Divinity or equivalent degree in a school of theology (seminary). However, individual Annual Conferences may require that a Master of Divinity or equivalent first professional degree be the minimum standard for entrance into the Annual Conference's Order of Elders, or presbyterate. Changes were made by the 1992 and 1996 General Conferences which revamped many aspects of the ordained offices in the United Methodist Church's polity and doctrine and made the Order of Deacon a permanent, rather than transitional, office. These reforms also elevated the previously unordained office of Diaconal Minister, who were lay persons performing specialized tasks within a congregational or ministry staff setting (such as music, education, youth ministry, etc.) to ordained status as permanent deacons as well.

== See also ==
- Presbyter and Minister – the office and title, respectively, used in British Methodism for its elders
- Methodist local preacher
- Ordination of women in the United Methodist Church
