= National Association of Wesleyan Evangelicals =

Methodist network of Wesleyan-Holiness churches

- Classification: Methodist
- Orientation: Holiness movement
- Theology: Wesleyan
- Polity: Congregational
- Region: United States (mostly the South)
- Origin: 2011
- Separated from: Evangelical Methodist Church
- Congregations: 7

The National Association of Wesleyan Evangelicals is a Methodist network of churches and ministers aligned with the Wesleyan-Holiness movement. It is based in the Southern United States and has one congregation in Mexico.

The association claimed seven member congregations as of 2026 and a handful of individual members, affiliated house churches, and ministries—most were formerly part of the Evangelical Methodist Church's now-dissolved Southern District. (It is not an association of denominations like the similarly named National Association of Evangelicals.) It has been headquartered in Carrollton, Georgia, since 2010, and officially formed in 2011 at its first annual meeting.

== History ==
The National Association of Wesleyan Evangelicals (NAWE) was formed in the wake of longstanding disagreements regarding congregationalism in its parent body, the Evangelical Methodist Church (EMC).

Evangelical Methodism began in 1946 as "a double protest against what were considered autocratic and undemocratic government on the one hand and a tendency toward modernism on the other in the Methodist Church." The predominant body which grew out of this movement was the EMC denomination, founded in 1946 and led by Dr. J. H. Hamblen, who had previously faced mainline Methodist church-law charges after forming an independent house-based congregation during a sabbatical.

The EMC was founded as a "congregational-connectional" association of churches with a goal of restoring American Methodism to its Wesleyan and Holiness roots, as well as subsequent revivalist practices.

Disagreement over congregational power and denominational control have led to many disputes and fractures, starting with the exodus of the congregationalist Evangelical Methodist Church of America in 1952. This disagreement reached a fever pitch in 2007 when plans were announced to centralize the U.S. districts of the EMC into a single entity, and expand the powers of the General Superintendent into a bishop-like role, complete with introducing this title as an alternative term for superintendent. The Southern District of the EMC disapproved of the changes at a 2008 conference.

The EMC's General Conference entered into legal action, and then court-ordered arbitration, with dissenting churches who wished to disaffiliate with the EMC because of these changes. Most of the Southern District churches which formed the NAWE simply dropped "Evangelical Methodist" from their name while retaining their property following the conclusion of the arbitration.

A key organizer of the association was W. Laurens Hudson, an Evangelical Methodist preacher who was educated at Asbury Theological Seminary.

NAWE advertises itself as "an association, not a denomination" to "come alongside pastors and their congregations to help them better serve their communities." The small network has developed a six-step course of study for certification and ordination, youth missions outings, and an annual ministers and wives retreat. The association meets annually.

The association maintains a standard evangelical Methodist theological stance, with a Wesleyan-Holiness teaching regarding sanctification: "We believe that there is a sanctifying experience available to all believers that is received by grace through faith on the condition of the believer’s total surrender to God and His will."

The NAWE cooperates with the Association of Independent Methodists as well as other Wesleyan-Holiness bodies and missions agencies.
