= Christian fundamentalism =

Religious movement emphasizing biblical literalism

Christian fundamentalism, also known as fundamental Christianity or fundamentalist Christianity, is a religious movement emphasizing biblical literalism. Fundamentalism is sometimes conflated with evangelicalism, of which it is a politically conservative subset. In its modern form, it began in the late 19th and early 20th centuries among British and American Protestants as a reaction to theological liberalism and cultural modernism. Fundamentalists argued that 19th-century modernist theologians had misunderstood or rejected certain doctrines, especially biblical inerrancy, which they considered the fundamentals of the Christian faith. Fundamentalists are almost always described as upholding beliefs in biblical infallibility and biblical inerrancy, in keeping with traditional Christian doctrines concerning biblical interpretation, the role of Jesus in the Bible, and the role of the church in society. Fundamentalists usually believe in a core of Christian beliefs, typically called the "Five Fundamentals". These arose from the Presbyterian Church issuance of "The Doctrinal Deliverance of 1910". Topics included are statements on the historical accuracy of the Bible and all of the events which are recorded in it as well as the Second Coming of Jesus Christ.

Fundamentalism manifests itself in various denominations which believe in various theologies, rather than a single denomination or a systematic theology. The ideology became active in the 1910s after the release of The Fundamentals, a twelve-volume set of essays, apologetic and polemic, written by conservative Protestant theologians in an attempt to defend beliefs which they considered Protestant orthodoxy. The movement became more organized within U.S. Protestant churches in the 1920s, especially among Presbyterians, as well as Baptists and Methodists. Many churches which embraced fundamentalism adopted a militant attitude with regard to their core beliefs. Reformed fundamentalists lay heavy emphasis on historic confessions of faith, such as the Westminster Confession of Faith, as well as uphold Princeton theology. Since 1930, many fundamentalist churches in the Baptist tradition (who generally affirm dispensationalism) have been represented by the Independent Fundamental Churches of America (renamed IFCA International in 1996), while many theologically conservative connexions in the Methodist tradition (who adhere to Wesleyan theology) align with the Interchurch Holiness Convention; in various countries, national bodies such as the American Council of Christian Churches exist to encourage dialogue between fundamentalist bodies of different denominational backgrounds. Other fundamentalist denominations have little contact with other bodies.

A few scholars label Catholic activist conservative associations who reject modern Christian theology in favor of more traditional doctrines as fundamentalists.

== Terminology ==
The term fundamentalism entered the English language in 1922, and it is often capitalized when it is used in reference to the religious movement. By the end of the 20th century, the term fundamentalism acquired a pejorative connotation, denoting religious fanaticism or extremism, especially when such labeling extended beyond the original movement which coined the term and those who self-identify as fundamentalists.

Some who hold certain, but not all beliefs in common with the original fundamentalist movement reject the label fundamentalism, due to its perceived pejorative nature, while others consider it a banner of pride. In certain parts of the United Kingdom, using the term fundamentalist with the intent to stir up religious hatred is a violation of the Racial and Religious Hatred Act of 2006.

== History ==
The movement has its origins in 1878 in a meeting of the "Believers' Meeting for Bible Study" (Niagara Bible Conference) in the United States, where 14 fundamental beliefs were established by evangelical pastors.

Fundamentalism draws from multiple traditions in British and American theologies during the 19th century. According to authors Robert D. Woodberry and Christian S. Smith,

Following the Civil War, tensions developed between Northern evangelical leaders over Darwinism and higher biblical criticism; Southerners remained unified in their opposition to both. ... Modernists attempted to update Christianity to match their view of science. They denied biblical miracles and argued that God manifests himself through the social evolution of society. Conservatives resisted these changes. These latent tensions rose to the surface after World War I in what came to be called the fundamentalist/modernist split.

However, the split does not mean that there were just two groups: modernists and fundamentalists. There were also people who considered themselves neo-evangelicals, separating themselves from the extreme components of fundamentalism. These neo-evangelicals also wanted to separate themselves from both the fundamentalist movement and the mainstream evangelical movement due to their anti-intellectual approaches.

From 1910 until 1915, a series of essays titled The Fundamentals: A Testimony to the Truth was published by the Testimony Publishing Company of Chicago.

The Northern Presbyterian Church (now Presbyterian Church in the United States of America) influenced the movement with the definition of the five "fundamentals" in 1910, namely

1. The inspiration of the Bible by the Holy Spirit and the inerrancy of Scripture as a result of this.
2. The virgin birth of Christ.
3. The belief that Christ's death was an atonement for sin.
4. The bodily resurrection of Christ.
5. The historical reality of Christ's miracles.

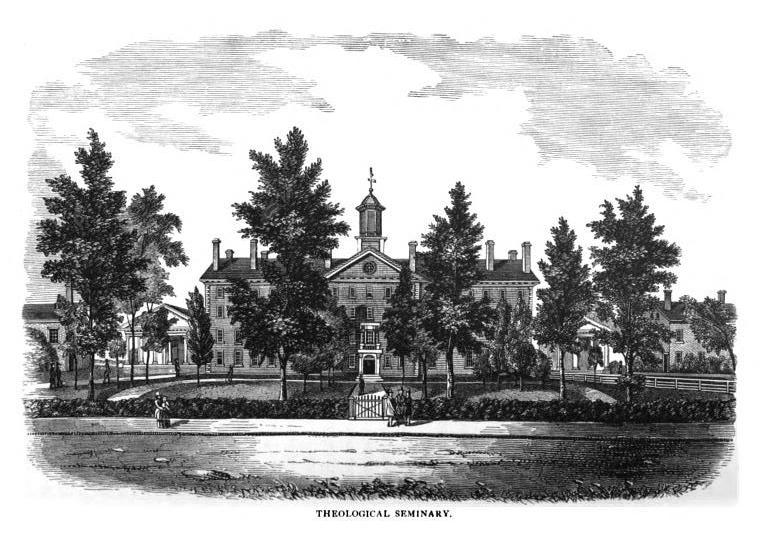
Princeton Seminary in the 19th century

The Princeton theology, which responded to higher criticism of the Bible by developing from the 1840s to 1920 the doctrine of inerrancy, was another influence in the movement. This doctrine, also called biblical inerrancy, stated that the Bible was divinely inspired, religiously authoritative, and without error. The Princeton Seminary professor of theology Charles Hodge insisted that the Bible was inerrant because God inspired or "breathed" his exact thoughts into the biblical writers (2 Timothy 3:16). Princeton theologians believed that the Bible should be read differently than any other historical document, and they also believed that Christian modernism and liberalism led people to Hell just like non-Christian religions did.

Biblical inerrancy was a particularly significant rallying point for fundamentalists. This approach to the Bible is associated with conservative evangelical hermeneutical approaches to Scripture, ranging from the historical-grammatical method to biblical literalism.

The Dallas Theological Seminary, founded in 1924 in Dallas, had a considerable influence in the movement by training students who established various independent Bible Colleges and fundamentalist churches in the southern United States.

In the 1930s, fundamentalism was viewed by many as a "last gasp" vestige of something from the past but more recently, scholars have shifted away from that view.

In the early 1940s, evangelicals and fundamentalist Christians began to part ways over whether to separate from modern culture (the fundamentalist approach) or engage with it. An organization very much on the side of separation from modernity was the American Council of Christian Churches, founded in 1941 by Rev. Carl McIntire. Another group "for conservative Christians who wanted to be culturally engaged" was the National Association of Evangelicals (NAE) founded in 1942, by Harold Ockenga.

== Changing interpretations ==
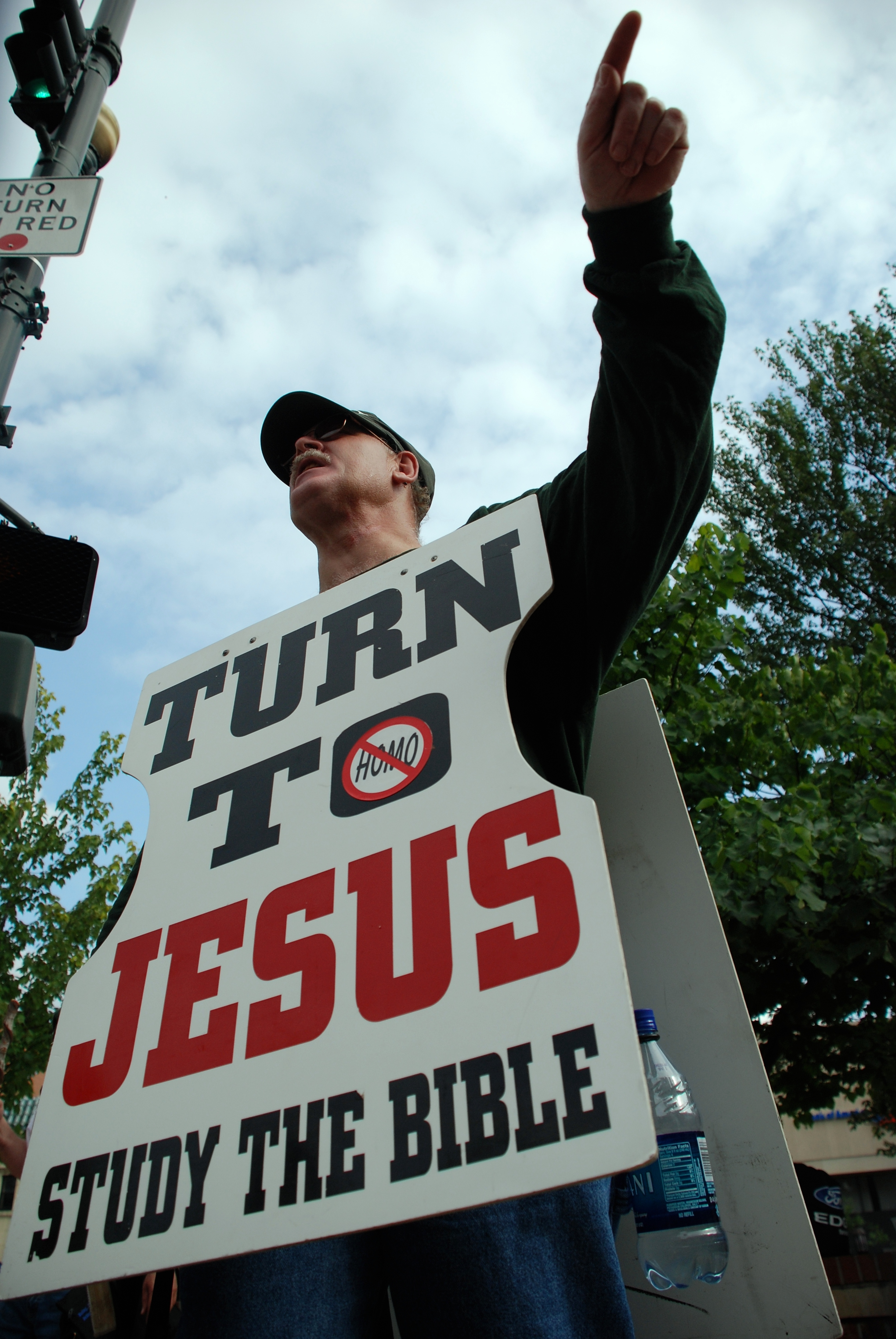
A Christian demonstrator preaching at Bele Chere

The interpretations given by the fundamentalist movement have changed over time, with most older interpretations being based on the concepts of social displacement or cultural lag. Some in the 1930s, including H. Richard Niebuhr, understood the conflict between fundamentalism and modernism to be part of a broader social conflict between the cities and the country. In this view the fundamentalists were country and small-town dwellers who were reacting against the progressivism of city dwellers. Fundamentalism was seen as a form of anti-intellectualism during the 1950s; in the early 1960s American intellectual and historian Richard Hofstadter interpreted it in terms of status anxiety, social displacement, and 'Manichean mentality'.

Beginning in the late 1960s, the movement began to be seen as "a bona fide religious, theological and even intellectual movement in its own right". Instead of interpreting fundamentalism as a simple anti-intellectualism, Paul Carter argued that "fundamentalists were simply intellectual in a way different than their opponents". Moving into the 1970s, Earnest R. Sandeen saw fundamentalism as arising from the confluence of Princeton theology and millennialism.

George Marsden defined fundamentalism as "militantly anti-modernist Protestant evangelicalism" in his 1980 work Fundamentalism and American Culture. Militant in this sense does not mean 'violent', it means 'aggressively active in a cause'. Marsden saw fundamentalism arising from a number of preexisting evangelical movements that responded to various perceived threats by joining forces. He argued that Christian fundamentalists were American evangelical Christians who in the 20th century opposed "both modernism in theology and the cultural changes that modernism endorsed. Militant opposition to modernism was what most clearly set off fundamentalism." Others viewing militancy as a core characteristic of the fundamentalist movement include Philip Melling, Ung Kyu Pak and Ronald Witherup. Donald McKim and David Wright (1992) argue that "in the 1920s, militant conservatives (fundamentalists) united to mount a conservative counter-offensive. Fundamentalists sought to rescue their denominations from the growth of modernism at home."

According to Marsden, recent scholars differentiate "fundamentalists" from "evangelicals" by arguing the former were more militant and less willing to collaborate with groups considered "modernist" in theology. In the 1940s the more moderate faction of fundamentalists maintained the same theology but began calling themselves "evangelicals" to stress their less militant position. Roger Olson (2007) identifies a more moderate faction of fundamentalists, which he calls "postfundamentalist", and says "most postfundamentalist evangelicals do not wish to be called fundamentalists, even though their basic theological orientation is not very different". According to Olson, a key event was the formation of the National Association of Evangelicals (NAE) in 1942. Barry Hankins (2008) has a similar view, saying "beginning in the 1940s....militant and separatist evangelicals came to be called fundamentalists, while culturally engaged and non-militant evangelicals were supposed to be called evangelicals."

Timothy Weber views fundamentalism as "a rather distinctive modern reaction to religious, social and intellectual changes of the late 1800s and early 1900s, a reaction that eventually took on a life of its own and changed significantly over time".

== By region ==
=== North America ===
Fundamentalist movements existed in most North American Protestant denominations by 1919 following attacks on modernist theology in Presbyterian and Baptist denominations. Fundamentalism was especially controversial among Presbyterians.

==== Canada ====
Peter Wiley Philpott (1865–1957) founded the United Christian Workers in Hamilton, Ontario, in 1892. This working-class religious movement later became the fundamentalist Associated Gospel Churches of Canada. In his speech at the 1919 World Conference on Christian Fundamentals in Philadelphia, he asserted that personal experience of conversion cannot be reasoned against or argued away.

An early fundamentalist leader was English-born Thomas Todhunter Shields (1873–1955), who led 80 churches out of the Baptist federation in Ontario in 1927 and formed the Union of Regular Baptist Churches of Ontario and Quebec. He was affiliated with the Baptist Bible Union, based in the United States. His newspaper, The Gospel Witness, reached 30,000 subscribers in 16 countries, giving him an international reputation. He was one of the founders of the international Council of Christian Churches.

Oswald J. Smith (1889–1986), reared in rural Ontario and educated at Moody Church in Chicago, set up The Peoples Church in Toronto in 1928. A dynamic preacher and leader in Canadian fundamentalism, Smith wrote 35 books and engaged in missionary work worldwide. Billy Graham called him "the greatest combination pastor, hymn writer, missionary statesman, an evangelist of our time."

==== United States ====
A leading organizer of the fundamentalist campaign against modernism in the United States was William Bell Riley, a Northern Baptist based in Minneapolis, where his Northwestern Bible and Missionary Training School (1902), Northwestern Evangelical Seminary (1935), and Northwestern College (1944) produced thousands of graduates. At a large conference in Philadelphia in 1919, Riley founded the World Christian Fundamentals Association (WCFA), which became the chief interdenominational fundamentalist organization in the 1920s. Some mark this conference as the public start of Christian fundamentalism. Although the fundamentalist drive to take control of the major Protestant denominations failed at the national level during the 1920s, the network of churches and missions fostered by Riley showed that the movement was growing in strength, especially in the U.S. South. Both rural and urban in character, the flourishing movement acted as a denominational surrogate and fostered a militant evangelical Christian orthodoxy. Riley was president of WCFA until 1929, after which the WCFA faded in importance. The Independent Fundamental Churches of America became a leading association of independent U.S. fundamentalist churches upon its founding in 1930. The American Council of Christian Churches was founded for fundamental Christian denominations as an alternative to the National Council of Churches.

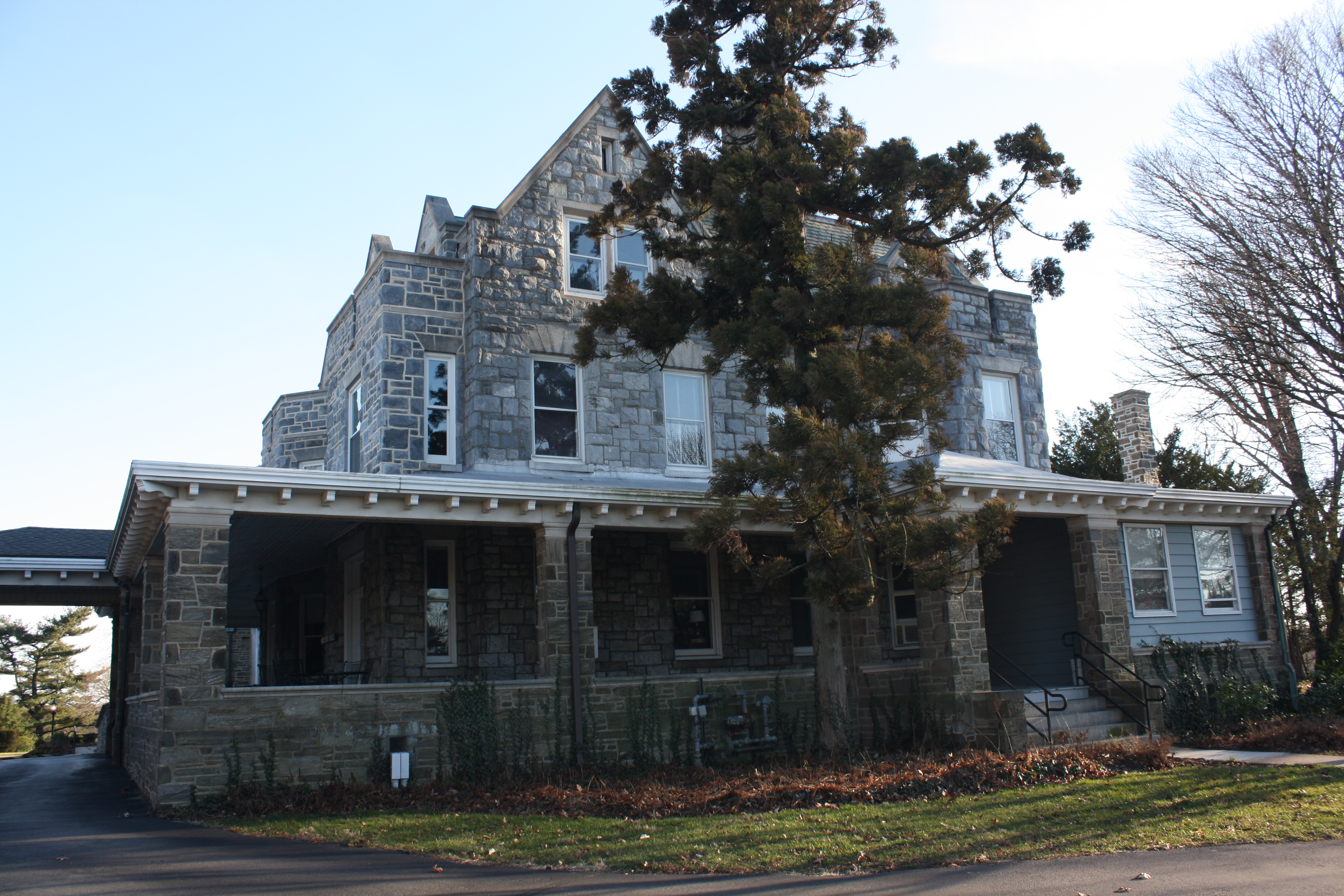
J. Gresham Machen Memorial Hall

Much of the enthusiasm for mobilizing fundamentalism came from Protestant seminaries and Protestant "Bible colleges" in the United States. Two leading fundamentalist seminaries were the dispensationalist Dallas Theological Seminary, founded in 1924 by Lewis Sperry Chafer, and the Reformed Westminster Theological Seminary, formed in 1929 under the leadership and funding of former Princeton Theological Seminary professor J. Gresham Machen. Many Bible colleges were modeled after the Moody Bible Institute in Chicago. Dwight Moody was influential in preaching the imminence of the Kingdom of God that was so important to dispensationalism. Bible colleges prepared ministers who lacked college or seminary experience with intense study of the Bible, often using the Scofield Reference Bible of 1909, a King James Version of the Bible with detailed notes which interprets passages from a dispensational perspective.

Although U.S. fundamentalism began in the North, the movement's largest base of popular support was in the South, especially among Southern Baptists, where individuals (and sometimes entire churches) left the convention and joined other Baptist denominations and movements which they believed were "more conservative" such as the Independent Baptist movement. By the late 1920s the national media had identified it with the South, largely ignoring manifestations elsewhere. In the mid-twentieth century, several Methodists left the mainline Methodist Church and established fundamental Methodist denominations, such as the Evangelical Methodist Church and the Fundamental Methodist Conference (cf. conservative holiness movement); others preferred congregating in Independent Methodist churches, many of which are affiliated with the Association of Independent Methodists, which is fundamentalist in its theological orientation. By the 1970s Protestant fundamentalism was deeply entrenched and concentrated in the U.S. South. In 1972–1980 General Social Surveys, 65 percent of respondents from the "East South Central" region (comprising Tennessee, Kentucky, Mississippi, and Alabama) self-identified as fundamentalist. The share of fundamentalists was at or near 50 percent in "West South Central" (Texas to Arkansas) and "South Atlantic" (Florida to Maryland), and at 25 percent or below elsewhere in the country, with the low of nine percent in New England. The pattern persisted into the 21st century; in 2006–2010 surveys, the average share of fundamentalists in the East South Central Region stood at 58 percent, while, in New England, it climbed slightly to 13 percent.

===== Evolution =====
In the 1920s, Christian fundamentalists "differed on how to understand the account of creation in Genesis" but they "agreed that God was the author of creation and that humans were distinct creatures, separate from animals, and made in the image of God." While some of them advocated the belief in Old Earth creationism and a few of them even advocated the belief in evolutionary creation, other "strident fundamentalists" advocated Young Earth Creationism and "associated evolution with last-days atheism." These "strident fundamentalists" in the 1920s devoted themselves to fighting against the teaching of evolution in the nation's schools and colleges, especially by passing state laws that affected public schools. William Bell Riley took the initiative in the 1925 Scopes Trial by bringing in famed politician William Jennings Bryan and hiring him to serve as an assistant to the local prosecutor, who helped draw national media attention to the trial. In the half century after the Scopes Trial, fundamentalists had little success in shaping government policy, and they were generally defeated in their efforts to reshape the mainline denominations, which refused to join fundamentalist attacks on evolution. Particularly after the Scopes Trial, liberals saw a division between Christians in favor of the teaching of evolution, whom they viewed as educated and tolerant, and Christians against evolution, whom they viewed as narrow-minded, tribal, and obscurantist.

Edwards (2000), however, challenges the consensus view among scholars that in the wake of the Scopes trial, fundamentalism retreated into the political and cultural background, a viewpoint which is evidenced in the movie Inherit the Wind and the majority of contemporary historical accounts. Rather, he argues, the cause of fundamentalism's retreat was the death of its leader, Bryan. Most fundamentalists saw the trial as a victory rather than a defeat, but Bryan's death soon afterward created a leadership void that no other fundamentalist leader could fill. Unlike the other fundamentalist leaders, Bryan brought name recognition, respectability, and the ability to forge a broad-based coalition of fundamentalist religious groups to argue in favor of the anti-evolutionist position.

Gatewood (1969) analyzes the transition from the anti-evolution crusade of the 1920s to the creation science movement of the 1960s. Despite some similarities between these two causes, the creation science movement represented a shift from religious to pseudoscientific objections to Darwin's theory. Creation science also differed in terms of popular leadership, rhetorical tone, and sectional focus. It lacked a prestigious leader like Bryan, utilized pseudoscientific argument rather than religious rhetoric, and was a product of California and Michigan rather than the Southern United States.

Webb (1991) traces the political and legal struggles between strict creationists and Darwinists to influence the extent to which evolution would be taught as science in Arizona and California schools. After Scopes was convicted, creationists throughout the United States sought similar anti-evolution laws for their states. These included Reverends R. S. Beal and Aubrey L. Moore in Arizona and members of the Creation Research Society in California, all supported by distinguished laymen. They sought to ban evolution as a topic for study, or at least relegate it to the status of unproven theory perhaps taught alongside the biblical version of creation. Educators, scientists, and other distinguished laymen favored evolution. This struggle occurred later in the Southwestern United States than in other US areas and persisted through the Sputnik era.

In recent times, the courts have heard cases on whether or not the Book of Genesis's creation account should be taught in science classrooms alongside evolution, most notably in the 2005 federal court case Kitzmiller v. Dover Area School District. Creationism was presented under the banner of intelligent design, with the book Of Pandas and People being its textbook. The trial ended with the judge deciding that teaching intelligent design in a science class was unconstitutional as it was a religious belief and not science.

The original fundamentalist movement divided along clearly defined lines within conservative evangelical Protestantism as issues progressed. Many groupings, large and small, were produced by this schism. Neo-evangelicalism, the Heritage movement, and Paleo-Orthodoxy have all developed distinct identities, but none of them acknowledge any more than an historical overlap with the fundamentalist movement, and the term is seldom used of them. The broader term "evangelical" includes fundamentalists as well as people with similar or identical religious beliefs who do not engage the outside challenge to the Bible as actively.

Writing in 2023, conservative Christian journalist David French quotes a former president of the Southern Baptist Convention's Ethics & Religious Liberty Commission, Richard Land, as identifying fundamentalism as "far more a psychology than a theology," with characteristics shared by competing Christian theologies and competing religions. According to French, that psychology is one that shares "three key traits": certainty (of a mind unclouded by doubt), ferocity (against perceived enemies of their religion) and solidarity (of "comrades in the foxhole", a virtue surpassing even piety in importance).

===== Christian right =====
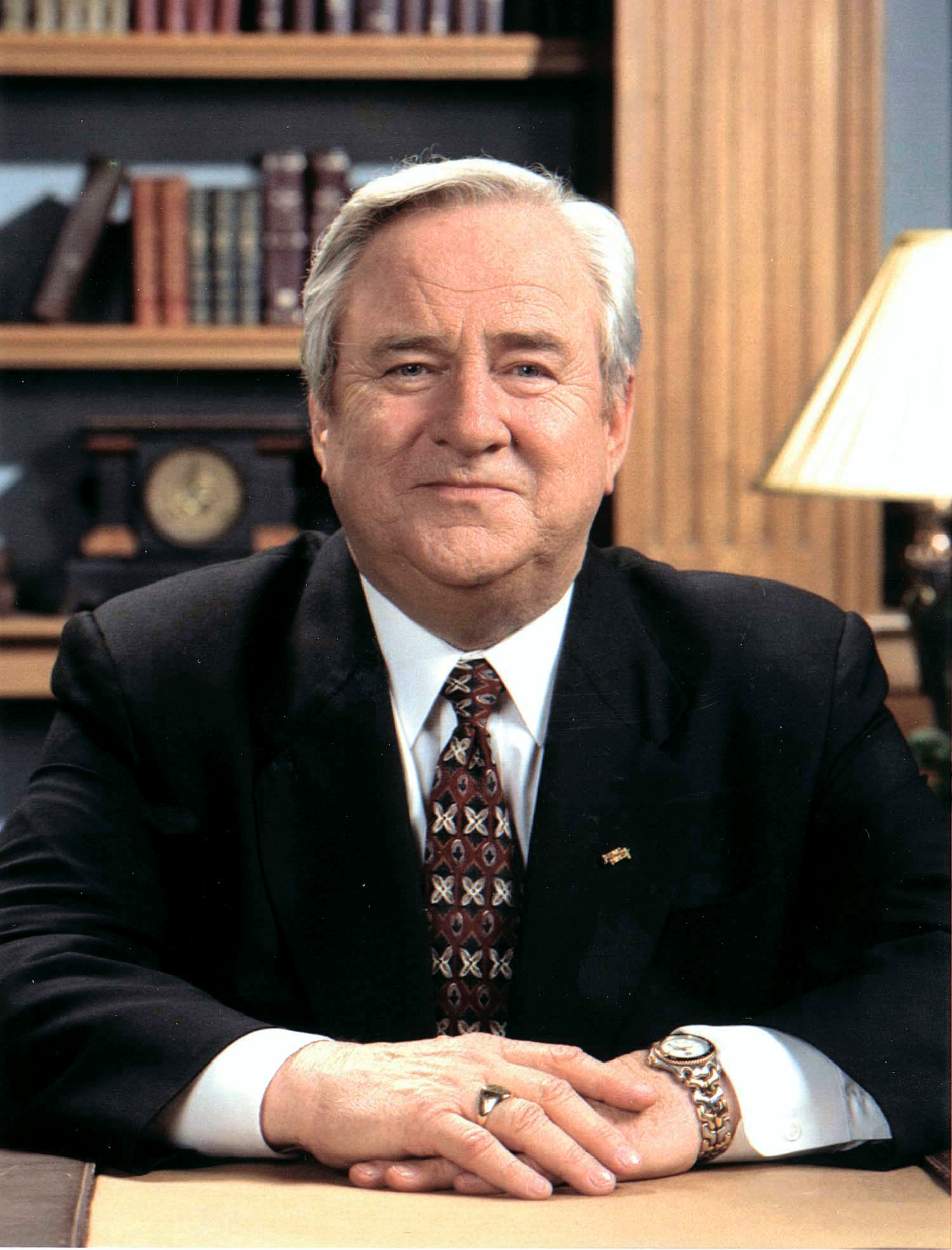
Jerry Falwell, whose founding of the Moral Majority was a key step in the formation of the "New Christian Right"

The latter half of the twentieth century witnessed a surge of interest in organized political activism by U.S. fundamentalists. Dispensational fundamentalists viewed the 1948 establishment of the state of Israel as an important sign of the fulfillment of biblical prophecy, and support for Israel became the centerpiece of their approach to U.S. foreign policy. United States Supreme Court decisions also ignited fundamentalists' interest in organized politics, particularly Engel v. Vitale in 1962, which prohibited state-sanctioned prayer in public schools, and Abington School District v. Schempp in 1963, which prohibited mandatory Bible reading in public schools. By the time Ronald Reagan ran for the presidency in 1980, fundamentalist preachers, like the prohibitionist ministers of the early 20th century, were organizing their congregations to vote for supportive candidates.

Leaders of the newly political fundamentalism included Rob Grant and Jerry Falwell. Beginning with Grant's American Christian Cause in 1974, Christian Voice throughout the 1970s and Falwell's Moral Majority in the 1980s, the Christian Right began to have a major impact on American politics. In the 1980s and 1990s, the Christian Right was influencing elections and policy with groups such as the Family Research Council (founded 1981 by James Dobson) and the Christian Coalition (formed in 1989 by Pat Robertson) helping conservative politicians, especially Republicans, to win state and national elections.

== By denomination ==
=== Independent Baptist Churches ===
Bible Baptist Churches, Fundamental Baptist Churches or Independent Baptist Churches refuse any form of ecclesial authority other than that of the local church. Great emphasis is placed on the literal interpretation of the Bible as the primary method of Bible study as well as the biblical inerrancy and the infallibility of their interpretation. Dispensationalism is common among Independent Baptists. They are opposed to any ecumenical movement with denominations that do not have the same beliefs. Many Independent Fundamentalist Baptist (IFB) churches adhere to only using the King James Version, a position known as King James Onlyism.

=== Methodism ===
Fundamental Methodism includes several connexions, such as the Evangelical Methodist Church and Fundamental Methodist Conference, along with their seminaries such as Breckbill Bible College. Additionally, Methodist connexions in the conservative holiness movement, such as the Allegheny Wesleyan Methodist Connection and Evangelical Methodist Church Conference, herald the beliefs of "separation from the world, from false doctrines, from other ecclesiastical connections" as well as place heavy emphasis on practicing holiness standards.

=== Nondenominationalism ===
In nondenominational Christianity of the evangelical variety, the word biblical or independent often appears in the name of the church or denomination. The independence of the church is claimed and affiliation with a Christian denomination is infrequent, although there are fundamentalist denominations.

=== Reformed fundamentalism ===
Reformed fundamentalism includes those denominations in the Reformed tradition (which includes the Continental Reformed, Presbyterian, Reformed Anglican and Reformed Baptist Churches) who adhere to the doctrine of biblical infallibility and lay heavy emphasis on historic confessions of faith, such as the Westminster Confession.

Examples of Reformed fundamentalist denominations include the Orthodox Presbyterian Church and the Free Presbyterian Church of Ulster.

== Criticism ==
Fundamentalists' literal interpretation of the Bible has been criticized by practitioners of biblical criticism for failing to take into account the circumstances in which the Christian Bible was written. Critics claim that this "literal interpretation" is not in keeping with the message which the scripture intended to convey when it was written, and it also uses the Bible for political purposes by presenting God "more as a God of judgement and punishment than as a God of love and mercy."

In contrast to the higher criticism, fundamentalism claims to keep the Bible open for the people. However, through the complexity of the dispensational framework, it has actually forced lay readers to remain dependent upon the inductive methods of Bible teachers and ministers.

Christian fundamentalism has been linked to child abuse as well as corporal punishment, with a number of practitioners believing that the Bible tells them to spank and or physically hit their children. Artists have addressed the issues of Christian fundamentalism, with one providing a slogan "America's Premier Child Abuse Brand."

Researchers find evidence connecting Christian fundamentalism with beliefs in conspiracy theories such as modern flat Earth beliefs. Fundamentalists have attempted and continue to attempt to teach intelligent design, a hypothesis with creationism as its base, in lieu of evolution in public schools. This has resulted in legal challenges such as the federal case of Kitzmiller v. Dover Area School District which resulted in the United States District Court for the Middle District of Pennsylvania ruling the teaching of intelligent design to be unconstitutional due to its religious roots.

== See also ==
- Bible Belt
- Christian eschatology
- Christian fascism
- Christian fundamentalism and conspiracy theories
- Christian values
- Christian Zionism
- Conservative evangelicalism in the United Kingdom
- A. C. Dixon
- Glossary of Christianity
- Hindu fundamentalism
- H. A. Ironside
- Islamic fundamentalism
- Jewish fundamentalism
- Moderate Christianity
- Mormon fundamentalism
- Plymouth Brethren
- Religious abuse
- Religious intolerance
- Billy Sunday
- R. A. Torrey
- Traditionalist Catholicism
- True Orthodox church

== Bibliography ==
- Alberta, Tim. The Kingdom, the Power, and the Glory: American Evangelicals in an Age of Extremism (2023)
- Almond, Gabriel A., R. Scott Appleby, and Emmanuel Sivan, eds. (2003). Strong Religion: The Rise of Fundamentalisms around the World.
- Ammerman, Nancy T. (1991). "North American Protestant Fundamentalism". In Marty, Martin E.; Appleby, R. Scott (eds.). Fundamentalisms Observed. The Fundamentalism Project, 1. Chicago, Il; London: University of Chicago Press. pp. 1–65. ISBN 0-226-50878-1.
- Armstrong, Karen (2001). The Battle for God. New York: Ballantine Books. ISBN 0-345-39169-1.
- Balmer, Randall (2nd ed 2004). Encyclopedia of Evangelicalism
- Balmer, Randall (2010). The Making of Evangelicalism: From Revivalism to Politics and Beyond, 120pp
- Balmer, Randall (2000). Blessed Assurance: A History of Evangelicalism in America
- Bebbington, David W. (1990). "Baptists and Fundamentalists in Inter-War Britain". In Keith Robbins, ed. Protestant Evangelicalism: Britain, Ireland, Germany and America c. 1750 – c. 1950. Studies in Church History subsidia 7, 297–326. Oxford: Blackwell Publishers, ISBN 0-631-17818-X.
- Bebbington, David W. (1993). "Martyrs for the Truth: Fundamentalists in Britain". In Diana Wood, ed. Martyrs and Martyrologies, Studies in Church History Vol. 30, 417–451. Oxford: Blackwell Publishers, ISBN 0-631-18868-1.
- Barr, James (1977). Fundamentalism. London: SCM Press. ISBN 0-334-00503-5.
- Caplan, Lionel (1987). Studies in Religious Fundamentalism. London: The MacMillan Press, ISBN 0-88706-518-X.
- Carpenter, Joel A. (1999). Revive Us Again: The Reawakening of American Fundamentalism. Oxford University Press, ISBN 0-19-512907-5.
- Cole, Stewart Grant (1931). The History of Fundamentalism, Greenwood Press ISBN 0-8371-5683-1.
- Dinges, William D.; Hitchcock, James (1991). "Roman Catholic Traditionalism and Activist Conservatism in the United States". In Marty, Martin E.; Appleby, R. Scott (eds.). Fundamentalisms Observed. The Fundamentalism Project, 1. Chicago, Il; London: University of Chicago Press. pp. 66–141. ISBN 0-226-50878-1.
- Dollar, George W. (1973). A History of Fundamentalism in America. Greenville: Bob Jones University Press.
- Doner, Colonel V. (2012). Christian Jihad: Neo-Fundamentalists and the Polarization of America, Samizdat Creative
- Elliott, David R. (1993). "Knowing No Borders: Canadian Contributions to Fundamentalism". In George A. Rawlyk and Mark A. Noll, eds. Amazing Grace: Evangelicalism in Australia, Britain, Canada and the United States. Grand Rapids: Baker. 349–374, ISBN 0-7735-1214-4.
- Furniss, Norman F. The Fundamentalist Controversy 1918–1931 (Yale University Press 1954).
- Hankins, Barry. (2008). American Evangelicals: A Contemporary History of A Mainstream Religious Movement.
- Harris, Harriet A. (1998). Fundamentalism and Evangelicals. Oxford University. ISBN 0-19-826960-9.
- Hart, D. G. (1998). "The Tie that Divides: Presbyterian Ecumenism, Fundamentalism and the History of Twentieth-Century American Protestantism". Westminster Theological Journal. 60: 85–107.
- Hofstadter, Richard. Anti–Intellectualism in American life (Knopf, 1964).
- Hughes, Richard Thomas (1988). The American quest for the primitive church 257pp excerpt and text search
- Keating, Karl (1988). Catholicism and Fundamentalism. San Francisco, Ca: Ignatius. ISBN 0-89870-177-5.
- Laats, Adam (Feb. 2010). "Forging a Fundamentalist 'One Best System': Struggles over Curriculum and Educational Philosophy for Christian Day Schools, 1970–1989", History of Education Quarterly, 50 (Feb. 2010), 55–83.
- Longfield, Bradley J. (1991). The Presbyterian Controversy. New York: Oxford University Press. ISBN 0-19-508674-0.
- Marsden, George M. (1995). "Fundamentalism as an American Phenomenon". In D. G. Hart, ed. Reckoning with the Past, 303–321. Grand Rapids: Baker.
- Marsden; George M. (1980). Fundamentalism and American Culture. Oxford: Oxford University Press. ISBN 0-19-502758-2; the standard scholarly history; excerpt and text search
- Marsden, George M. (1991). Understanding Fundamentalism and Evangelicalism.
- McCune, Rolland D (1998). "The Formation of New Evangelicalism (Part One): Historical and Theological Antecedents" (PDF). Detroit Baptist Seminary Journal. 3: 3–34. Archived from the original on 10 September 2005.
- McLachlan, Douglas R. (1993). Reclaiming Authentic Fundamentalism. Independence, Mo.: American Association of Christian Schools. ISBN 0-918407-02-8.
- Noll, Mark (1992). A History of Christianity in the United States and Canada.. Grand Rapids: Wm. B. Eerdmans Publishing Company. 311–389. ISBN 0-8028-0651-1.
- Noll, Mark A., David W. Bebbington and George A. Rawlyk eds. (1994). Evangelicalism: Comparative Studies of Popular Protestantism in North America, the British Isles and Beyond, 1700–1990.
- Rawlyk, George A., and Mark A. Noll, eds. (1993). Amazing Grace: Evangelicalism in Australia, Britain, Canada, and the United States.
- Rennie, Ian S. (1994). "Fundamentalism and the Varieties of North Atlantic Evangelicalism". in Mark A. Noll, David W. Bebbington and George A. Rawlyk eds. Evangelicalism: Comparative Studies of Popular Protestantism in North America, the British Isles and Beyond, 1700–1990. New York: Oxford University Press. 333–364, ISBN 0-19-508362-8.
- Russell, C. Allyn (1976), Voices of American Fundamentalism: Seven Biographical Studies, Philadelphia: Westminster Press, ISBN 0-664-20814-2
- Ruthven, Malise (2007). Fundamentalism: A Very Short Introduction.
- Sandeen, Ernest Robert (1970). The Roots of Fundamentalism: British and American Millenarianism, 1800–1930, Chicago: University of Chicago Press, ISBN 0-226-73467-6
- Seat, Leroy (2007). Fed Up with Fundamentalism: A Historical, Theological, and Personal Appraisal of Christian Fundamentalism. Liberty, MO: 4-L Publications. ISBN 978-1-59526-859-4
- Small, Robyn (2004). A Delightful Inheritance (1st ed.). Wilsonton, Queensland: Robyn Small. ISBN 978-1-920855-73-4.
- Stackhouse, John G. (1993). Canadian Evangelicalism in the Twentieth Century
- Szasz, Ferenc Morton. The Divided Mind of Protestant America 1880–1930 (University of Alabama Press, 1982).
- Trollinger, William V. (1991). God's Empire: William Bell Riley and Midwestern Fundamentalism.
- Utzinger, J. Michael (2006). Yet Saints Their Watch Are Keeping: Fundamentalists, Modernists, and the Development of Evangelical Ecclesiology, 1887–1937, Macon: Mercer University Press, ISBN 0-86554-902-8
- Witherup, S. S., Ronald, D. (2001). Biblical Fundamentalism: What Every Catholic Should Know, 101pp
- Woods, Thomas E. et al. "Fundamentalism: What Role did the Fundamentalists Play in American Society of the 1920s?" in History in Dispute Vol. 3: American Social and Political Movements, 1900–1945: Pursuit of Progress (Gale, 2000), 13pp online at Gale.
- Young, F. Lionel, III, (2005). "To the Right of Billy Graham: John R. Rice's 1957 Crusade Against New Evangelicalism and the End of the Fundamentalist-Evangelical Coalition". Th. M. Thesis, Trinity Evangelical Divinity School.

=== Primary sources ===
- Hankins, Barr, ed. (2008). Evangelicalism and Fundamentalism: A Documentary Reader.
- Dixon, A. C.; Meyer, Louis; Archer Torrey, Reuben, eds. (1910–1915). The Fundamentals: A Testimony To The Truth. Chicago: Testimony Publishing Company.
- Trollinger, William Vance Jr., ed. (1995). The Antievolution Pamphlets of William Bell Riley. (Creationism in Twentieth-Century America: A Ten-Volume Anthology of Documents, 1903–1961. Vol. 4.) New York: Garland, 221 pp.
