= World Methodist Council =

Consultative body and association of churches in the Methodist tradition, founded in 1881

- Logo
- Abbreviation: WMC
- Type: Communion
- Classification: Protestant
- Orientation: Methodist
- Scripture: Protestant Bible
- Theology: Wesleyan
- General Secretary: Revd. Dr. Reynaldo Ferreira Leão Neto
- President: Bishop Debra Wallace-Padgett
- Vice-President: Joshua Rathnam
- Origin: 1881
- Members: 40–51 million (self-reported)
- Official website: worldmethodistcouncil.org

The World Methodist Council (WMC) is a consultative body that represents churches within Methodism and facilitates cooperation among its member denominations. It comprises 81 denominations in 138 countries which together represent the majority of Methodists worldwide, along with united churches that include Methodist traditions. Altogether, its members make up the ninth-largest Christian communion.

== History ==
The World Methodist Council was founded at a conference in London, England, at Wesley Chapel, in 1881. Four hundred delegates from 30 Methodist organizations around the world attended. Subsequently, world conferences were held every ten years. In 1956, the Council established its permanent headquarters in Lake Junaluska, North Carolina, in the United States. In 2021, the Council sold its headquarters, which included a museum, and moved to Waynesville, North Carolina.

The WMC has stated, since 2018, that its member churches represent approximately 80 million people. In 2020, World Christian Database, the online version of the World Christian Encyclopedia, published by Edinburgh University Press, reported that the World Methodist Council had 70,226,000 members. However, according to statistics released by the WMC itself in 2014, the sum of the statistics of the member denominations themselves, as well as several independent sources, the number of Methodists worldwide is close to 40 - 51 million people.

In 2024, the Thailand Union Methodist Church was received as the 81st member denomination.

== Affiliated organizations ==
Affiliated organizations are the World Fellowship of Methodist and Uniting Churches, the Oxford-Institute of Methodist Theological Studies, the World Methodist Historical Society, World Council of Confederation of Methodist Youth, the World Council of Methodist Men, World Methodist Council of Teens, the World Federation of Methodist and Uniting Church Women.

== Members ==
In 2016, the World Methodist Council was made up of 80 member denominations:

Country	denominational subfamily	Denomination	Number of members	Year
International	Methodist	United Methodist Church (Note: Each of the internal conferences listed is considered a member of the World Methodist Council, even though it is a body part of the United Methodist Church.): Central African Conference; Central and Southern European Central Conference; Congo Central Conference; German Central Conference; Northern Europe Central Conference; Philippines Central Conference; West Africa Central Conference; US Conferences; Liberia Conference	11,299,000	2025
International	Methodist	Church of the Nazarene	2,764,205	2025
International	Methodist	African Methodist Episcopal Zion Church	1,432,795	2014
International	Methodist	Wesleyan Church	140,954	2017
International	Methodist	Free Methodist Church	1,547,820	2018
International	Methodist	African Methodist Episcopal Church	2,500,000	2014
South Africa, Lesotho, Eswatini, Mozambique and Namibia	Methodist	Methodist Church of Southern Africa	2,600,000	2014
Argentina	Methodist	Evangelical Methodist Church in Argentina	5,599	2017
Australia	Methodist	Chinese Methodist Church in Australia	3,588	2014
Australia	Methodist	Wesleyan Methodist Church of Australia	2,452	2014
Australia	United Churches (Presbyterians, Methodists and Congregationalists)	Uniting Church in Australia	243,000	2018
Bahamas	Methodist	Bahamas Conference of the Methodist Church	1,900	2014
Bangladesh	Methodist	Bangladesh Methodist Church	18,201	2014
Belgium	United Churches (Continental Reformed and Methodist)	United Protestant Church in Belgium	3,401	2014
Benin	Methodist	Protestant Methodist Church in Benin	90,000	2014
Bolivia	Methodist	Evangelical Methodist Church in Bolivia	9,053	2014
Brazil	Methodist	Methodist Church in Brazil	262,449	2022
Canada	United Churches (Presbyterians, Congregationalists and Methodists)	United Church of Canada	325,315	2023
Caribbean	Methodist	Methodist Church in the Caribbean and the Americas	62,120	2014
Chile	Methodist	Methodist Church in Chile	9,882	2014
China (People's Republic of China)	United Churches (Presbyterians, Congregationalists, Baptists and Methodists)	Hong Kong Council of the Church of Christ in China	36,000	2016
China (People's Republic of China)	Methodist	Methodist Church, Hong Kong	12,000	2014
Colombia	Methodist	Colombian Methodist Church	1,000	2014
South Korea	Methodist	Korean Methodist Church	1,106,385	2023
Costa Rica	Methodist	Evangelical Methodist Church in Costa Rica	16,000	2014
Côte d'Ivoire	Methodist	United Methodist Church of Ivory Coast	1,018,402	2026
Cuba	Methodist	Methodist Church in Cuba	33,000	2014
Congo (Democratic Republic of Congo)	Methodist	Free Methodist Church of the Democratic Republic of the Congo	151,695	2014
Dominican Republic	Methodist	Evangelical Church of the Dominican Republic	10,000	2014
Ecuador	United Churches (Presbyterians and Methodists)	United Evangelical Church of Ecuador	1,500	2014
Spain	United Churches (Presbyterians, Congregationalists, Waldensians, Methodists and Lutherans)	Spanish Evangelical Church	3,000	2014
Fiji	Methodist	Methodist Church of Fiji and Rotuma	212,860	2014
Gambia	Methodist	Gambia Methodist Church	2,000	2014
Ghana	Methodist	Methodist Church Ghana	634,689	2014
India	Methodist	Methodist Church in India	648,000	2014
India	United Churches (Presbyterians, Anglicans, Methodists and Disciples of Christ)	Church of North India	2,300,000	2025
India	United Churches (Presbyterians, Congregationalists, Continental Reformed, Anglicans and Methodists)	Church of South India	5,000,000	2020
Indonesia	Methodist	Methodist Church in Indonesia	119,000	2014
Ireland	Methodist	Methodist Church in Ireland	15,000	2014
Italy	Methodist	Methodist Evangelical Church in Italy	4,000	2014
Kenya	Methodist	Methodist Church in Kenya	450,000	2014
Malaysia	Methodist	Methodist Church in Malaysia	97,197	2014
Mexico	Methodist	Methodist Church of Mexico	40,000	2014
Myanmar	Methodist	Methodist Church, Lower Myanmar	2,300	2014
Myanmar	Methodist	Methodist Church, Upper Myanmar	27,543	2014
Nepal	Methodist	Nepal Methodist Church	264	2014
Nigeria	Methodist	Methodist Church of Nigeria	2,000,000	2014
New Zealand	Methodist	Methodist Church of New Zealand	14,736	2014
New Zealand	Methodist	New Zealand Wesleyan Methodist Church	794	2014
Pakistan	United Churches (Presbyterians, Methodists, Lutherans and Anglicans)	Church of Pakistan	1,900,000	2020
Panama	Methodist	Evangelical Methodist Church of Panama	1,300	2014
Paraguay	Methodist	Methodist Evangelical Community of Paraguay	1,025	2014
Peru	Methodist	Methodist Church of Peru	32,000	2014
Philippines	Methodist	Evangelical Methodist Church in the Philippine Islands	27,793	2020
Philippines	United Churches (Presbyterians, Baptists, Disciples of Christ and Methodists)	United Church of Christ in the Philippines	470,792	2020
Portugal	Methodist	Portuguese Evangelical Methodist Church	1,200	2014
Puerto Rico	Methodist	Puerto Rico Methodist Church	12,000	2014
Rwanda	Methodist	Rwanda Free Methodist Church	108,559	2014
Samoa	Methodist	Samoa Methodist Church	35,983	2014
Sierra Leone	Methodist	Sierra Leone Methodist Church	50,000	2014
Sierra Leone	Methodist	West African Methodist Church in Sierra Leone	4,000	2014
Singapore	Methodist	Methodist Church in Singapore	38,000	2014
Sri Lanka	Methodist	Methodist Church in Sri Lanka	25,000	2014
Sweden	United Churches (Baptists, PT and Methodist)	Uniting Church in Sweden	58,569	2021
Taiwan (Republic of China)	Methodist	Methodist Church in the Republic of China	4,500	2014
Tanzania	Methodist	Tanzania Methodist Church	3,681	2014
Thailand	Methodist	Thailand Union Methodist Church	3,000	2024
Togo	Methodist	Togo Methodist Church	75,000	2014
Tonga	Methodist	Free Wesleyan Church	38,692	2014
United Kingdom	Methodist	Methodist Church in Great Britain	136,891	2022
United States of America	Methodist	Christian Methodist Episcopal Church	858,670	2014
Zambia	United Churches (Presbyterians and Methodists)	United Church of Zambia	4,000,000	2024
Zimbabwe	Methodist	Zimbabwe Methodist Church	111,723	2014
Zimbabwe	Methodist	African Methodist Church of Zimbabwe	12,000	2014
Global	Sub-total	Methodists	28,570,169	2014-2025
Global	Sub-total	United Churches	14,341,577	2014-2025
Global	Total	World Methodist Council	45,289,477	2014-2025

== Member Profile ==
1. United Methodist Church (18.8%)
2. Other Methodist denominations (45.9%)
3. United Churches (35.3%)

The WMC is made up of around 81 member denominations.

In 2014 it was estimated that together, the member denominations had about 39,745,196 members and 51,286,152 adherents. (Note: adherents are unbaptized people who participate in worship services. In Credobaptist denominations, the children of members, not yet baptized, are counted as adherents.)

According to the most up-to-date statistics available, among member denominations, the United Methodist Church represents 18.75% of individual members, other Methodist churches are 45.91% and united churches represent 35.34% of individual members.

However, some of the largest WMC member denominations face a rapid decline in membership between 2000 and 2024.

In 2018, the WMC disclosed that its 80 member denominations represented an estimated 80 million people These numbers would supposedly include around 60 million members and 20 million adherents.

However, the 2018 figures contradict all independent statistics based on national censuses, as well as the combined statistics released by member Methodist and United churches themselves. According to several independent sources, Methodist churches have about 40 million members worldwide.

A 2011 report by the Pew Forum on Religious and Public Life estimated that members of Methodist churches (excluding United churches) represent 3.5% of the world's approximately 801 million Protestants, or about 27,234. 000 people.

According to Christianity Global: A Guide to the World's Largest Religion from Afghanistan to Zimbabwe, in 2020, there were 31,683,000 Methodists in the world (not including United Churches), corresponding to 0.4% of the global population and 14,706,000 members of the Holiness Movement (0.2% of the world population), with a total of 46,389,000 members of the Methodism and Holiness Movement, or 0.6% of the global population .

The WMC does not represent all Methodists in the world and the organization's member united and uniting churches total only 14.3 million members, according to their own denominational statistics.

Therefore, WMC statistics from 2014 are considered more reliable compared to independent sources.

== Beliefs ==
=== Marriage ===
Among the 81 member denominations, 7 permit or support same-sex marriage or blessings for same-sex unions. These are: United Methodist Church, Methodist Church of Great Britain, Spanish Evangelical Church, United Church of Canada, Uniting Church in Australia, Uniting Church in Sweden, and United Protestant Church in Belgium.

== World Methodist Conference ==
The highest organ of the World Methodist Council is the World Methodist Conference, which meets every five years. The 22nd Conference was held in Gothenburg, Sweden in 2024. The theme was 'On the Move' and focussed on migration.

The 21st Conference was held in 2016 in Houston, Texas in the United States. The theme was "ONE". Organized around four sub themes – One God, One Faith, One People, One Mission.

The 2011 conference, gathered under the theme "Jesus Christ - for the Healing of the Nations", was held in August 2011 in Durban, South Africa. On 24 July 2006, Sunday Mbang stepped down as chairperson of the council and John Barrett took over his position as well as elected president for the council.

In 2006, it formally approved the Joint Declaration on the Doctrine of Justification.

== World Methodist Council officers ==
Current officers are:

- General secretary: The Rev Reynaldo Ferreira Leão Neto
- President: Bishop Debra Wallace-Padgett
- Vice-President: Joshua Rathnam
- Treasurer: Myron Howie
- Youth and young adult coordinator: Stefanie Gabuyo

The World Methodist Council has offices in Methodist Central Hall Westminster, London.

== Activities ==
=== Continuous activities ===
The World Methodist Council has eight standing committees:

- Ecumenics and Dialogue is engaged in ecumenical dialogue with the Roman Catholic Church, the Anglican Communion, the Lutheran World Federation, the Salvation Army and the World Alliance of Reformed Churches. It is also working towards a dialogue with the Eastern Orthodox Church and with certain Pentecostal churches.
- Education is concerned with education in churches and with Methodist educational institutions. It has organized an international Association of Methodist Schools, Colleges, and Universities promoting quality and value-centered education. The association links representatives from over 700 Methodist related schools and colleges all over the world.
- Evangelism is coordinating worldwide evangelism efforts of Methodist churches
- Family Life is concerned with applying Christian values to issues like relationships in marriage, rights of children, rights of the aged, prevalence of violence and changing roles of women and men in society;
- Social and International Affairs is focusing currently on economic justice or injustice. It has worked out the World Methodist Social Affirmation which was approved in 1986 and is part of the literature of several Methodist denominations.
- Theological Education focuses on training for ministry based on basic Christian beliefs and distinctive emphases from the Wesleyan tradition.
- Worship and Liturgy encourages the study of liturgy and forms of worship, especially issues as language and culture, corporate and private worship, music and liturgy, cultural influences, and balancing Christian tradition with local emphasis. Develops hymnals and resources.
- Youth and Young Adults focuses on empowering young people, taking its motto from 1st Timothy 4;12 and Ephesians 4:12–13: "Don't let anyone look down on you because you are young, but set and example for the believers in speech, in life, in love, in faith and in purity. To equip the saints for the work of ministry, for building up the body of Christ, until all of us come to the unity of the faith and of the knowledge of the son of God, to maturity, to the measure of the full stature of Christ."

=== Peace award ===
The World Methodist Peace Award is the highest honor bestowed by Methodists around the world. Since 1977, it is given annually by the World Methodist Council. This award is given to individuals or groups "who have made significant contributions to peace, reconciliation and justice".

Recipients of the World Methodist Peace Award include Habitat for Humanity International, Nelson Mandela, Jimmy Carter, Boris Trajkovski, former President of Macedonia; the Community of Sant'Egidio in Rome, and the Grandmothers of the Plaza de Mayo in Argentina.

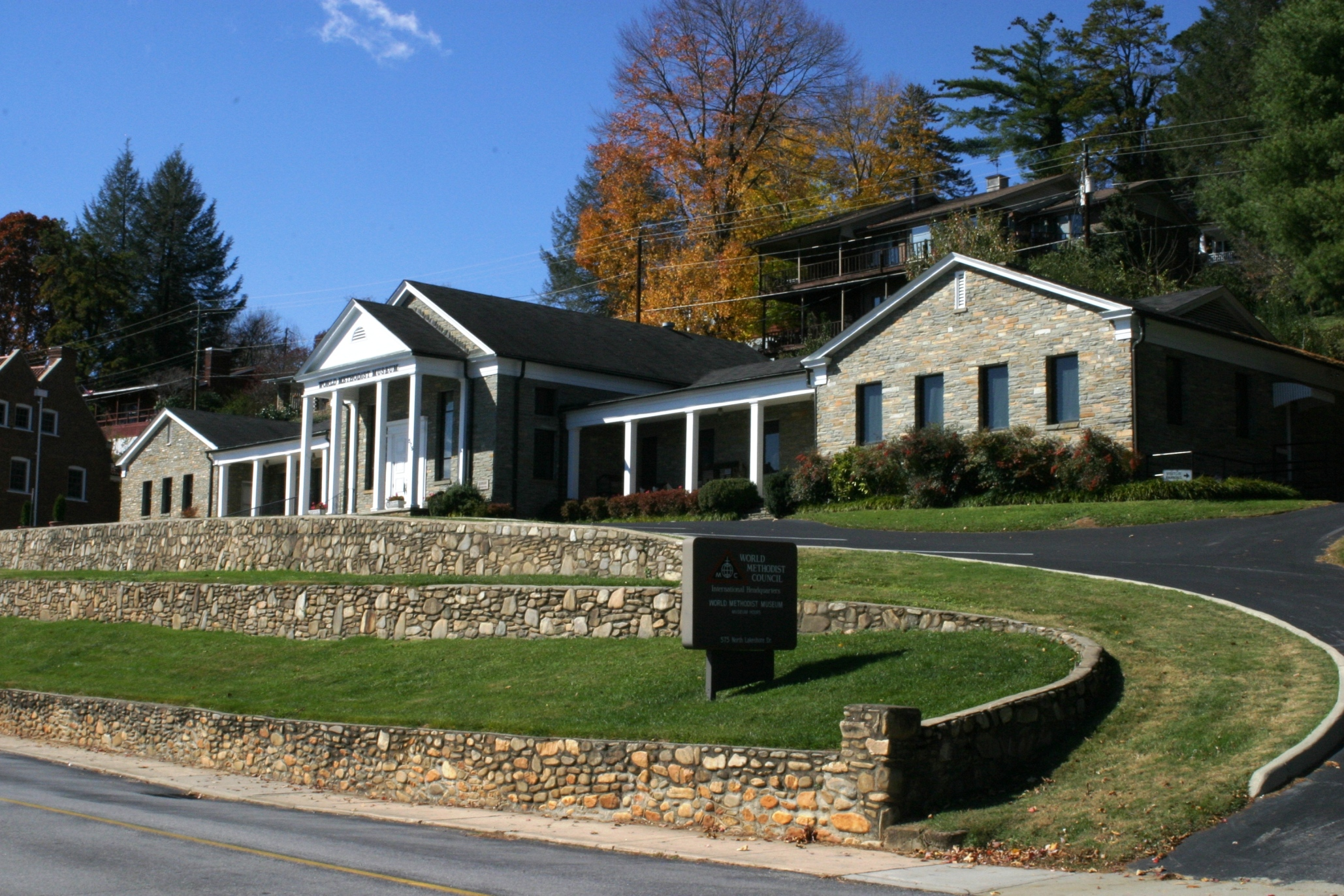
Former World Methodist Council Museum near the office building (hardly visible on the left) of its former headquarters at Lake Junaluska, North Carolina; nearby is a small park, the Susanna Wesley Garden

=== Evangelism institute ===
One ministry of the World Methodist Council is the World Methodist Evangelism Institute in Atlanta, Georgia. It is an educational institution committed to the task of world evangelization and connected to a major university, Candler School of Theology, Emory University.

== Former headquarters and museum ==
In the 1950s, area residents and Methodists from the Southeastern United States raised money for the construction of a building in Lake Junaluska, North Carolina to attract the World Methodist Council headquarters. Until the 1970s, the museum building was to go to the Lake Junaluska Assembly if no longer needed, although that plan was changed. The Royce and Jane Reynolds Headquarters building, intended to resemble the house where John Wesley lived when he was young, was added in the 1990s after a donation from the Reynolds family. The museum housed letters written by Wesley, a pulpit Wesley used, and a 1594 Geneva Bible, as well as ancient items from the Holy Land. Starting in 2013, with the museum having problems, the sale of the building was considered but the assembly made no formal offer. The COVID-19 pandemic finally made closing the museum necessary, and its contents went to Bridwell Library of Perkins School of Theology, Southern Methodist University in Dallas, Texas. In Spring 2021, the World Methodist Council sold its headquarters building, including a museum, to the assembly for $1.25 million. The World Methodist Council moved to offices in nearby Waynesville, North Carolina.

At a Lake Junaluska Board of Trustees meeting in March 2022, Lake Junaluska Executive Director Ken Howle announced a $1.1 million gift from Anne and Mike Warren, who also gave $625,000 toward the purchase of the headquarters building and part of the Susanna Wesley Garden next door. The gift from the Warrens helped with $2.5 million in renovations to what is now called the Warren Center, for smaller group events.

== See also ==
- List of Methodist denominations
- List of the largest Protestant denominations
