= Independent Baptist Fellowship of North America =

The Independent Baptist Fellowship of North America (IBFNA) is a separatist fundamentalist independent Baptist fellowship for pastors and laymembers. Sometimes confused with the Independent Baptist Fellowship International (IBFI), the IBFNA is a northern-oriented fellowship formed by individuals who left the General Association of Regular Baptist Churches (GARBC) due to what they felt was a drift of the association away from their original separatist position. The Fellowship was organized in October 1990 at Oshkosh, Wisconsin. Its constitution was ratified in 1993 at Providence, Rhode Island. It is composed of individuals rather than churches. Individuals must renew their membership annually; churches are recognized as 'supporting churches' by financially supporting the Fellowship. This body is very local church oriented, and all boards, institutions, and agencies remain in the hands of the churches. Articles of Faith have been adopted, containing statements on the Scriptures, the Triune God, Salvation, Sanctification, the Church, Biblical Separation, Civil Government, Creation, The Fall of Man, the Devil, and End times. The Review is a quarterly published by the IBFNA. A Conference is held annually.

In 1994, the individual members of the Fellowship were from 106 different churches, 60 of which were not affiliated with other bodies and 46 were dually aligned with the IBFNA and the GARBC. The greatest strength of this group is in Pennsylvania. A few members are located in Canada. The Independent Baptist Fellowship of North America is a member of the American Council of Christian Churches.

== Sources ==
- Wardin, Albert W. (1995). Baptists around the world: a comprehensive handbook. Nashville, Tenn: Broadman & Holman. ISBN 0-8054-1076-7.
