= Evangelical Methodist Church of America =

Christian Denomination

- Classification: Protestant (Methodist)
- Orientation: Evangelical, Fundamental Conservative Holiness
- Polity: Congregational
- Associations: American Council of Christian Churches
- Region: Worldwide: North American Conference with several mission fields
- Origin: 1946 (1953)
- Separated from: The Methodist Church, Evangelical Methodist Church
- Congregations: 16 (U.S.)

The Evangelical Methodist Church of America (or Evangelical Methodist Conference) Christian denomination based in the United States. Ardently Fundamental, the denomination has its roots in a movement of churches that broke away from Mainline Methodism in the 1940s and 50s.

The small denomination comprised sixteen churches as of July 2018. It operates Breckbill Bible College in Virginia. Dr. James B. Fields is the general superintendent of this group, which claims mission work in Suriname, Jamaica, Chile, Nigeria, France, Kenya and Malawi. It is headquartered in Kingsport, Tennessee. Principal strength of the denomination is centered in the Northeastern and Southern United States.

The denomination publishes The Evangelical Methodist in conjunction with the likeminded Fundamental Methodist Church.

== History ==
Evangelical Methodism began as "a double protest against what were considered autocratic and undemocratic government on the one hand and a tendency toward modernism on the other in the Methodist Church."

The 1938 merger of the three major Methodist bodies in the U.S. (and charges of growing authoritarianism in the new leadership structure), the Fundamentalist–Modernist Controversy (including perennial fights over evolution and scriptural reliability), Anti-Communist sentiment, and the success of the early Evangelical movement contributed to a series of small schisms from Mainline Methodism in the mid-Twentieth Century.

A gathering of disaffected Methodist preachers and laymen in 1946 in Memphis, Tennessee, gave rise to the Evangelical Methodist Church (EMC) denomination. This first gathering was inspired by the withdrawal of the pastor of some of Methodism's largest churches of that era, Dr. J. H. Hamblen. Hamblen's exit from a large church in Texas generated significant press coverage, leading to this coalition of conservative preachers and laymen from various pockets of the Holiness movement and Fundamental Methodism. After some prayer and deliberation they began work forming a new denomination to rival what they saw as a liberal trend in the Methodist Church. Among the founders of this movement was W. W. Breckbill (1907–1974).

By 1952 differences regarding key doctrines came to the forefront, especially in regard to the Wesleyan tenet of entire sanctification, the conditional security of the believer, and Congregationalism. According to Hamblen, about 20 clergy and laymen led by Breckbill walked out of the 1952 conference in Altoona, Pennsylvania when they could not agree on Wesleyan doctrine of Holiness.

A formal conference was established by Breckbill's allies in 1953. The conference has gone by several names since organization: the Evangelical (Independent) Methodist Churches, the Fellowship of Evangelical Methodist Churches, the Evangelical Methodist Conference, the Evangelical Methodist Church of America, "the Fundamental EMC," or simply the Evangelical Methodist Church. The larger EMC pursued legal action against Breckbill's group regarding the name and other intellectual property.

This Fundamental EMC formed Breckbill Bible College in 1957 in Williamsburg, Pennsylvania, named for its preferred founding figure. It is a charter member of the American Council of Christian Churches, an answer to ecumenical bodies such as the World Council of Churches.

According to an observer, the development of a separate, fundamental EMC summarized the tensions between Holiness and non-Holiness conservatives present in many denominations in the wake of the Fundamentalist-Modernist Controversy.

"The history of the Evangelical Methodist Church illustrates the tensions inherent in a Fundamentalist-Holiness relationship. Founded in 1946 as a protest against growing liberalism in the Methodist Episcopal Church, the Evangelical Methodist Church contained both Holiness and non-Holiness factions. Eventually, the tension grew too great, and in 1952 the denomination split over the issue of entire sanctification. The non-Holiness segment, led by W. W. (William Wallace) Breckbill, took the more ardently Fundamentalist position, aligning itself with the American Council of Christian Churches, a Fundamentalist alliance. In this case, mutual opposition to liberalism was not sufficient to make up for deep differences over the doctrine of sanctification. Once the split took place, those opposed to entire sanctification [as restricted to a crisis experience alone, rather than either a crisis experience or occurring after a gradual growth in grace] found themselves more comfortable in the Fundamentalist camp. This story reproduces in miniature the general outline of Fundamentalist-Holiness interaction.

== Mergers ==
On October 5, 1950, in Shelbyville, Indiana, the Evangelical Zion Methodist Church, founded by Rev. M. D. Opara, of Nigeria, West Africa, was received into the original EMC's General Conference along with about 10,000 members. This body aligned with W.W. Breckbill's faction after 1952.

A merger with the Southern Methodist Church failed in 1958 when Breckbill's EMC would not accept a condition that the name of the combined church be The Southern Methodist Church.

== Beliefs ==
This wing of the Evangelical Methodist movement is more into cultural separatism than the larger EMC body, preferring modesty in clothing and refraining from "worldly amusements." It does not teach the doctrine of Entire Sanctification as a second, crisis experience as do many Methodist offshoots but prefers a progressivist view. It is congregationalist in polity. The denomination has more beliefs in common with the distinctly Fundamental Conservative Holiness Movement than what is often called the Evangelical-Holiness movement. As recently as 2011, a resolution stated:

Evangelical Methodists call upon God's people to separate from churches or other religious groups that advocate modernism, new evangelicalism, the modern charismatic movement, ecumenism, Roman Catholicism, cultism and other theological theories which question, add to, subtract from, or twist the Word of God. Evangelical Methodists believe that there is only one true and living God of the Scriptures, and therefore reject all other religious persuasions.

A prior resolution by the body from the 1990s decried the men's parachurch organization Promise Keepers as "an admixture of New Evangelicals, Cultists, Roman Catholics and others forming an unbiblical amalgamation that is anti-Scriptural."

== Relation to other Evangelical Methodist groups ==
There are many denominations internationally that are unrelated to the U.S. EMCs, including Evangelical Methodist Church in Bolivia, Evangelical Methodist Church in the Philippine Islands, and others.
