= The People's Methodist Church =

Wesleyan-Holiness denomination

The People's Methodist Church was a Methodist denomination aligned with the Wesleyan-Holiness movement. Based in the Southern United States from 1938–1962, it was founded by revivalist Jim H. Green.

The denomination consisted of around 1,000 members in 25 churches in the U.S. states of North Carolina, Virginia, and Georgia at the time of its merger with the like-minded Evangelical Methodist Church in 1962.

== History ==
James Henderson "Jim" Green (21 June, 1881 – 23 May, 1955) founded the People's Methodist Church. Born in a one-room cabin in Ashe County, North Carolina, Green became an educator and, following a high-profile religious conversion, a prominent and fiery Methodist Episcopal Church South minister and evangelist.

Denouncing the inroads of theological liberalism on one hand, and the allure of worldly prestige on the other, Green left the Methodist Episcopal Church South in 1926. He described this event as "the saddest hour of my ministerial career. It almost killed me." (Green would reunite with the mainline Methodist fold in 1954, about six months before his death of a stroke.)

During his time away from the Methodist Church, Green was an itinerant Evangelist in the Church of the Nazarene and founded the independent Lighthouse Mission in St. Louis, which he served from 1929–31.

In 1932 he established the People's Bible School on property that recently held the defunct Greensboro Bible and Literary Institute in Greensboro, North Carolina. The college, which started with four faculty (from the previous institute) and 18 students, later became known as John Wesley College (1956). This college distributed the People's Herald periodical, later titled The Crusader. The college remained non-denominational while promoting a distinctively Wesleyan-Holiness view on entire sanctification, with Methodist Evangelist and Holiness pamphleteer John R. Church as its first board chairman.

When Green's students required more preaching opportunities than what was available to young ministers in training, a "chain of tabernacles"—the People's Christian Movement—was organized. This connection consisted of members of churches friendly to Green's revivalism and new churches planted by Green and company. Founded in 1938, the movement was later re-branded the People's Methodist Church. It was described as the "institutional consummation of Green's nearly forty years of personal tent and tabernacle revivalism throughout North Carolina."

Green was superintendent of the People's Methodist Church until 1951. During this time, Green founded Camp Free in Connelly Springs, North Carolina, White City Camp near the white, sandy lake shore of Avon Park, Florida, in 1940 (now Avon Park Holiness Camp ), and Sunny South Camp in Greensboro in 1946 with the assistance of H. C. Morrison of Asbury College.

The name "People's" reportedly troubled many of Green's followers during the "Red Scare" of the early 1950s. Conservative and anti-Socialist Green decried the love of wealth and regularly criticized prominent American religious institutions, as Communist sympathizers during this period were prone to do for vastly different reasons.

== Merger ==
Green, in his biography published one year before his death and around the time of his reconciliation with the mainline Methodist Church, expressed some second thoughts about the formation of a separate denomination:

In the year 1938-39 our Bible School was facing the problem of having students who needed places to preach holiness but had no churches in which to expound their God-given convictions. To meet this need we set ourselves to the task of starting a few, plain, inexpensive tabernacles where we could feel free to preach. The school never intended to start a new church denomination and I never yet felt sure that it was the will of God for this to be started except as a plain movement where our boys could feel free to preach and hold revivals. I sometimes fear that it went beyond the will of God by getting so much machinery that it became a bit tangled up; but the Lord knows that we were sincerely seeking to please Him in forming this movement which we believe was a necessity in His work.

The "chain of tabernacles" would stay independent for only a short time following Green's departure, but the movement never returned to the mother church as Green did. Seven years after Green's death, the People's Methodists pursued union with the growing Evangelical Methodist Church (or "EMC"), headquartered in Wichita, Kansas, and itself a division from the mainline Methodist Church. The EMC had a similar origin with a prominent pastor and revivalist (J. H. Hamblen) at the helm who left the Methodist Church on matters of conscience and doctrine.

On July 3, 1962, the General Conference of the Evangelical Methodist Church voted to merge with the People's Methodist Church. The merger was finalized by the People's Methodist Church at a subsequent conference that same summer. Rev. J. Neal Anderson, General Superintendent of the People's Methodist Church at the time of the merger, was elected Superintendent of the newly created Virginia-North Carolina District of the EMC (as of 2016, all districts are now under the auspices of the EMC's singular USA District).

The People's Methodist merger with the EMC came two years after another denominational pairing on the opposite side of the continent. In 1960, the EMC and another Wesleyan-Holiness body associated with higher education, the Evangel Church (headed by Azusa Pacific College president C. P. Haggard), had come together to form a new California District. Both mergers gave the modest EMC a stronger coast-to-coast presence in the United States.
