= Evangel Church =

Wesleyan-Holiness Evangelical Christian denomination (1933-1960)

The Evangel Church was a Wesleyan-Holiness Evangelical Christian denomination from 1933 to 1960.

The denomination was centered in the U.S. state of California with eight churches and 675 members at the time of its merger with the like-minded Evangelical Methodist Church.

== History ==
The denomination was founded as the Evangelistic Tabernacles by Azusa Pacific College figureheads Dr. William Kirby and Dr. Cornelius Paul Haggard on March 27, 1933.

Kirby, president of the college from 1937–39, had previously led a movement away from the direct leadership of the Quaker/Friends meeting influential in the school's ecumenical founding. Kirby had joined the faculty in 1924 and quickly became an unofficial spokesman for the school's fundamentalists. Kirby and his theological allies challenged the increasingly Modernist stances of the Quaker leadership who had aligned with an anti-revivalist position as several comparable Quaker/Friends colleges had been doing since around 1915. When a religion department was established, it was with the understanding that "religion was to be primarily an object of study, not a creed to be adopted." This reluctance to stand for a list of fundamental doctrines, joined with a support for Higher Criticism of the Bible and the theory of Evolution, drew intense criticism from conservative Friends and Holiness movement adherents associated with the college.

Kirby and company broke away from the local Friends church in 1933. They began a new, Wesleyan-Holiness congregation on campus which became "the school church." This shift diminished Quaker influence and related funding. The shift solidified the school's identity as an Evangelical Holiness institution.

C. P. Haggard followed Kirby as president and led the nondenominational school through several re-locations, four name changes, mergers with Wesleyan colleges, and rescued it from the brink of low attendance and financial exigency. He is the namesake of the theology school and served as president for nearly four decades.

During this time of mergers and moves, students and faculty planted many local churches which organized as the Evangelistic Tabernacles and later the Evangel Church—informally called "the Tabernacle movement."

In the late 1950s, Haggard approached the General Superintendent of the fledgling Evangelical Methodist Church (or "EMC"), Dr. J.H. Hamblen, about a partnership between his new network of churches and the EMC. According to Hamblen, "I made it a matter of prayer that God would send a man who could take my place if anything should happen [to me]. At the Phoenix Conference as I was preparing to call the Conference to order, a tall, ruddy faced young man came in the front door. God spoke to my heart, ‘There comes your man.’ I was not sure who he was, but I arose and went down the aisle. He reached out his big hand and greeted me and said, ‘I have come to join you.'”

Under the leadership of President R. Lloyd Wilson, the Evangel Church, Inc., Annual Conference voted to unite with the Evangelical Methodist Church on June 4, 1960. The merger was approved by the Western Annual Conference of the Evangelical Methodist Church on June 22, 1960, thus forming a strengthened California District. At the time of the merger, the Evangel Church had eight churches and 675 enrolled in Sunday School classes.

This merger, along with the addition of the People's Methodist Church on the East Coast in 1962, gave the modest Evangelical Methodist Church a stronger coast-to-coast presence in the United States.

Haggard served as an Assistant General Superintendent of the Evangelical Methodist Church. He declined nomination as General Superintendent, the top office of the EMC, so he could focus on his administrative responsibilities with the college he loved.
