= Jeremiah J. Park =

Bishop of the United Methodist Church

- Born: July 4, 1952 (age 72); Jae Chun, Korea
- Occupation(s): Deacon, elder, district superintendent, bishop
- Years active: 1979–present
- Title: Bishop of the Susquehanna Conference
- Term: 2004–present
- Predecessor: Jane Allen Middleton

Jeremiah J. Park is a bishop of the United Methodist Church. He was elected in 2004, and first served the New York Annual Conference. He began serving the Susquehanna Conference on September 1, 2012.

== Birth and family ==
Jeremiah was born in Jae Chun, Korea on July 4, 1952. He is married and has kids.

== Education ==
He graduated in 1973 from Seoul Methodist Theological School as an honors student, receiving a Bachelor of Divinity. He went on to graduate cum laude from Drew University Theological School receiving a Master of Divinity. He completed his Doctor of Ministry at Drew University Theological School in 1990.

== Ordained ministry ==
In 1979 Bishop C. Dale White ordained him as a deacon of the Northern New Jersey Annual Conference. He was ordained as an Elder in 1981 by Bishop Joseph Hughes Yeakel for the Western New York Annual Conference.

== See also ==
- List of bishops of the United Methodist Church
