= Evangelical Methodist Church =

Methodist denomination in the US

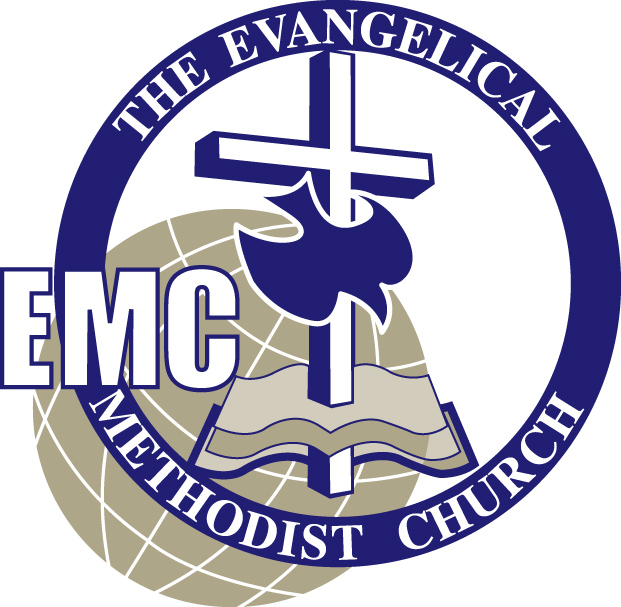
- Evangelical Methodist Church International logo
- Classification: Protestant
- Orientation: Methodist
- Theology: Evangelical, Holiness
- Polity: Congregational-Connectional
- Associations: Christian Holiness Partnership, Global Wesleyan Alliance (2011)
- Region: Worldwide: North American Conference divided into two districts (US and Canada) and Mexico Missions Conference.
- Headquarters: Indianapolis, Indiana
- Origin: 1946
- Separated from: The Methodist Church
- Merger of: The People's Methodist Church (1962), Evangel Church (1960)
- Separations: Evangelical Methodist Church of America (1953); Bethel Methodist Church (1989); National Association of Wesleyan Evangelicals (2010)
- Congregations: Worldwide 399, US 80
- Members: Approx. 34,656

The Evangelical Methodist Church (EMC) is a Christian denomination in the Wesleyan-Holiness tradition headquartered in Indianapolis, Indiana. The denomination reported 399 churches in the United States, Mexico, Burma/Myanmar, Canada, Philippines and several European and African nations in 2018, and a total of 34,656 members worldwide (with about 7,300 members in around 80 churches in the United States).

== Beliefs ==
In its Book of Discipline, the EMC describes itself as being "orthodox in belief, pre-millennial regarding the second coming, missionary in outlook, evangelistic in endeavor, cooperative in spirit, and Wesleyan in doctrine."

Theologically, the EMC is Wesleyan-Arminian and teaches a Holiness message, emphasizing the inerrancy of the Bible and the power of the Holy Spirit to cleanse a Christian from sin and to keep him or her from falling back into a sinful lifestyle. The EMC believes in salvation through faith by grace. A further doctrine, "prevenient grace," holds that God allows every person to make a choice in response to the Gospel, and apart from that grace man cannot freely choose to follow Christ and be saved from God's future judgment. According to their teachings, the saved Christian will grow in Christ-likeness throughout life via progressive sanctification, but there is also the experience of entire sanctification—a "second, crisis experience" in which a believer's heart is cleansed of self-centered ambition and replaced by a perfect love for God and other people. A fully sanctified Christian is expected by the EMC to live a holy lifestyle that reflects the character of Christ to the world (which they emphasize is neither "sinless perfection" nor legalism).

== History ==
The Evangelical Methodist Church was established on May 9, 1946, as the result of a prayer meeting where clergy and laity of the Methodist Church (USA) gathered in Memphis, Tennessee. Dr. J. H. Hamblen was elected chairman of the meeting and became the first General Superintendent of the new denomination.

=== Reaction to liberalism ===
The formation of the EMC represented "a double protest against what were considered autocratic and undemocratic government on the one hand and a tendency toward modernism on the other in the Methodist Church, from which the body withdrew."

The EMC has roots in the 18th century English Methodist movement pioneered by John Wesley. They also trace their lineage to the missions of Francis Asbury, Thomas Coke, and other circuit riders of the 19th century. The "old fashioned" Methodism that they preached grew rapidly as they enthusiastically preached a Bible-based message with an emphasis on free will through the act of prevenient grace and on individual personal responsibility before God. Through local congregations and missions, Methodism inspired an evangelistic push in North America among many denominations to share the Gospel of Jesus Christ with those they considered spiritually lost or "sin-sick."

However, some doctrinal differences began to emerge among Methodists in the late 1800s and early 1900s, particularly in the wake of disagreements concerning the teachings of the Holiness movement and the Fundamentalist–Modernist Controversy. The EMC Book of Discipline (based on the Methodist Church Book of Discipline) recalled: "With a firm conviction that the gulf that separates conservative and liberal thought in the church is an ever-widening chasm which can never be healed, the Evangelical Methodist Church came into being to preserve the distinctive Biblical doctrines of primitive Methodism, founded upon the inspiration and authenticity of the Bible and upon the Articles of Religion as set forth by John Wesley. [...] the only infallible proof of any genuine church of Christ is its ability to seek and save the lost, to disseminate the Christian spirit and life, to spread scriptural holiness as taught by the Lord Jesus Christ in the Word of God over all lands, and to transform all people through the Gospel of Christ."

=== Mergers ===
In its second decade, the EMC merged with two smaller denominations that shared its views on sanctification, grace, and evangelism.

- On June 4, 1960, the Evangel Church, Inc., in session at its annual conference, voted to unite with the Evangelical Methodist Church and thus become a part of the California District. Formerly known as the Evangelistic Tabernacles and founded by Azusa Pacific College figureheads Dr. William Kirby and Dr. Cornelius P. Haggard, the denomination dates back to March 27, 1933. At the time of merger there were 8 churches and about 675 enrolled in Sunday school, with Rev. R. Lloyd Wilson serving as president of the organization. This merger was approved by the Western Annual Conference of the Evangelical Methodist Church on June 22, 1960.
- On July 3, 1962, the General Conference of the Evangelical Methodist Church voted to merge with the People's Methodist Church, formerly known as the People's Christian Movement, which came into being on January 1, 1938, with Rev. Jim H. Green of John Wesley College as the first General Superintendent. The merger was finalized by a vote of the People's Methodist Church at a subsequent conference in the summer of 1962. Rev. J. Neal Anderson, General Superintendent at the time of the merger, was elected Superintendent of the Virginia-North Carolina District.

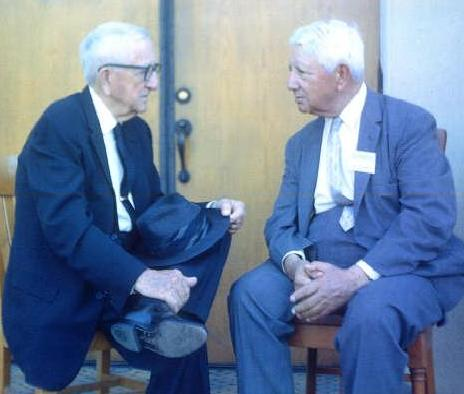
Dr. J.H. Hamblen (left), founder of the EMC, converses with Ezekiel Vargas (right) of Mexico in this undated photo.

At the first EMC conference in 1948, delegates wholeheartedly approved a plan presented by circuit-riding preacher Dr. Ezequiel B. Vargas, superintendent of the Mexican Evangelistic Mission (MEM), that his missions group become a part of the Evangelical Methodist Church. Dr. Vargas and Dr. Hamblen maintained a strong friendship and working relationship. A Bible institute in Torreón, Mexico, Instituto Bíblico Vida y Verdad, is the result of this work.

On October 5, 1950, in Shelbyville, Indiana, the Evangelical Zion Methodist Church, founded by Rev. M. D. Opara, of Nigeria, was received into the General Conference along with about 10,000 members. This body later aligned with W.W. Breckbill's Evangelical (Independent) Methodist Conference which established its own organizational identity after 1952. Another Nigerian body, the Bible Methodist Church in Nigeria, consisting of around 20 congregations and a school, joined the EMC in 1974 as the Nigerian Annual Conference. This brief relationship was terminated in 1976 when missionaries determined the group had support from many denominations and groups offering financial assistance.

A mention was made at the 2006 General Conference of talks with the Evangelical Church regarding a possible merger. The denominations share a common ministry training school.

The Churches of Christ in Christian Union (CCCU) is referred to as a "sister denomination" to the EMC and sends an observer to its general conferences. That denomination is itself a Wesleyan protest (having left the Restorationist Christian Union) and has merged with several smaller denominations including the Holiness Churches of Christ, the Reformed Methodist Church's Northeast District, and at times strongly considered union with the EMC. The CCCU renamed its youth ministry "Evangelical Christian Youth" in expectation of a merger.

=== Divisions ===
In 1953, a schism occurred after W.W. Breckbill organized the Evangelical Methodist Church of America, which is theologically Fundamental and Methodist.

The Bethel Methodist Church, sprung from a theological disagreement within the EMC Mid-States District. A trial was conducted on March 24, 1989, and the Mid-States district superintendent was defrocked. Three churches left the EMC with him, all in Texas.

Another offshoot, the National Association of Wesleyan Evangelicals, is composed of five former Southern District EMC churches. It was formed in the wake of the consolidation of EMC districts in 2010 and legally binding arbitration regarding their desire to leave the denomination. These churches were considered disaffiliated by the General Council following the settlement of the local churches' remaining financial obligations to the conference.

=== Growth ===
In 1984, as well as during the 2020–2024 schism in the United Methodist Church, a number of former United Methodist clergy and congregations joined traditionalist Methodist denominations, which included the Evangelical Methodist Church. Among those who left the United Methodist Church in 1984 was minister Edward Williamson, who was elected a bishop in the EMC in 1998; during his reign, the EMC established conferences in Mexico, Philippines, Myanmar, Africa, Canada, and Europe.

== Structure ==
The EMC is headquartered in the Hamblen-Bruner Headquarters Building in Indianapolis. It maintains a congregational-connectional form of church polity, which has been significantly amended in recent years to reflect greater connectionalism.

The Evangelical Methodist Youth logo (2008).

Local churches in the U.S. are gathered into regions within the North America Conference. Districts include the U.S., Canada, and the Mexican Evangelistic Mission. (This "one conference model" replaced the longstanding practice of several, self-governing district conferences within the U.S. and separate missions conferences abroad.)

Conference-licensed orders of ministry include: Local Preachers, Elders, Deacons and Deaconesses. Historically, the EMC has recognized Song Evangelists and Lay Exhorters as orders appointed by the local church.

Departments include: Prayer, Stewardship, Pensions, Publications and Multicultural Ministries. Auxiliaries of the denomination include Men, Women and Youth organizations.

Local church administrative structures vary, but the Book of Discipline calls for a board of Stewards and a board of Trustees to work in conjunction with the senior pastor. The senior pastor is responsible for oversight of the local church's ministries and other ministers.

=== General Superintendents ===
| Elected | MEM Gen. Superintendent |
|---|---|
| 1946 | Ezekiel Vargas |
| 1965 | Eduardo Salido |
| 1970 | Constantine Cardenas |
| 1994 | Brother Augustine |
| 2002 | Constantine Cardenas |
| 2012 | Ausencio Saenz |

| Elected | Myanmar Gen. Superintendent |
|---|---|
| 2000 | Dar Ro Thanga |
| 2010 | Lal Sawi Vela |

| Elected | U.S. Gen. Superintendent |
|---|---|
| 1946 | J.H. Hamblen |
| 1962 | Ralph Vanderwood |
| 1974 | Lloyd Garrett |
| 1976 | John Kunkle |
| 1986 | Clyde Zehr |
| 1994 | Jack Wease |
| 1998 | Edward Williamson |

| Elected | Int'l Gen. Superintendent |
|---|---|
| 2010 | Edward Williamson |
| 2018 | Max Edwards |

General Superintendents are elected by a quadrennial international general conference. The terms General Superintendent and Bishop have come to be considered synonymous—multicultural churches and mission conferences are advised to use either title that aligns with their traditions. The title of bishop was introduced by General Superintendent Ed Williamson who addressed himself as bishop.

There are superintendents for each of the missions conferences and world areas, as well as an international general superintendent. At the 2010 General Conference, the title of U.S. General Superintendent was changed to International General Superintendent.

=== Membership ===
Worshipers in local churches may become members via the usual Methodist manner: by consulting with the local pastor, making a profession of faith, and taking a vow of membership. Candidates must have been previously baptized with water.

Congregations are located in 25 U.S. states, and they have a presence in 20 other countries (including Myanmar, Canada, Mexico, and others) through various missions organizations (with strong ties to World Gospel Mission and One Mission Society). The EMC claimed 399 total churches worldwide and approximately 34,656 members in 2018.

North American Conferences (Canada, Mexico and the United States) have the largest amount of local churches with 149 congregations—80 of those are in the United States. As of 2018, United States membership is approximately 7,316 people. In 2005, there were 108 churches and 7,348 members in the United States.

== Restructuring ==
In March 2010 the 30th General Conference adopted a two-district conference model, called the North America Conference, which included USA, Mexico and Canada. The model called for two districts, USA and Canada. The USA district was allotted four Conference Superintendents and Canada one Conference Superintendent. The new conference structure reduced the number of boards with similar functions from 27 to 7. There were no changes made in local church structure, or powers and descriptions of the superintendents. Opponents to the plan were concerned that regional representation would be lost and that too much authority was being given to international headquarters. Supporters said the reforms were necessary for greater organizational heath and local church growth.

These reforms came as a result of decades of discussion over whether the "congregational-connectional" EMC was to be more congregational or more connectional in its polity.

=== Efforts toward greater congregationalism ===
Then-General Superintendent Rev. Lloyd H. Garrett's report to a 1976 special session of the General Conference in Wichita, Kansas highlighted a strong congregational tradition within the EMC, though his suggested reforms (including the elimination of his own office) fell short:

We must not delude ourselves into the trap of thinking that more stringent laws are the solution. Clashing concepts of government in our Discipline are already a growing problem. The connectional relationship of our congregations with the denomination is voluntary in its origin and continuance. As long as property ownership and the final decision concerning pastoral leadership are vested in the local churches (where they rightfully belong) the true voice of authority and power rests with them. The rest of the church organization must serve them [...] The office of General Superintendent as it is presently structured is too isolated from the church which he is in theory supposed to shepherd.

Garrett referenced a recent strengthening and giving of full-time status to the office of the District Superintendents. Garrett proposed in this speech merging the Annual and District Conferences to reduce overhead (which was successful) and eliminating the office of General Superintendent in favor of a cabinet of District Superintendents (which failed). Garrett announced he would resign his position regardless of the outcome.

A task force on restructuring given at the same convention by Rev. Gordon W. Johnson reinforced the importance of a General Superintendent office while addressing fears that the connectional element of the EMC was being forgotten.

=== A move toward stronger connectionalism ===
During a "Forum on the Future" held on September 11–14, 1984, in Duncanville, Texas, then-General Superintendent Rev. John Kunkle defended the more connectional tradition within the EMC:

... Unfortunately, a widespread distinctive of the Evangelical Methodist Church today is an overemphasis on congregationalism. Some go so far as to state that "we are a congregational church," which of course is not true. We are a congregational-connectional church and that makes a world of difference. Without the 'connectional' aspect we cannot even be a true denomination. The "connectional" relationship that must prevail if any church is be a real denomination is clearly delineated in our Discipline and bylaws. These rules and regulations clearly supersede and overrule pure congregationalism. Our failure in many places and many cases to accept this fact accounts for most of the problems we face today. Congregationalism rejects, repulses, and ultimately refuses to accept any rule, control, or disciplinary action outside of its own self-centered body. To build a genuine denomination under such conditions is an impossibility. Paul (Apostle) did not father congregationalism, nor did he found congregational churches. Even under the difficult travel and communication problems he faced, there was a connectionalism that remained in control. There was a General Conference which ruled on all serious issues and their rulings were binding on all congregations. When there were serious problems in local churches, Paul did not just tell them to carry on the best they could until he got there and he would then let the congregation vote and decide the issue. This did not happen, and though widely separated in distance and time, the connection was there, sharp and clear. If it was important to them as widely scattered as they were, how much more so is it important for us in these days when we have marvelous communications and travel possibilities.

Reorganization discussions continued as exemplified in the annual reports of General Superintendent Clyde Zehr and Atlantic District Superintendent Dr. Charles Church. During this time the number of districts were reduced from nine to seven. General Superintendent Edward Williamson in 2000 began a 10-year study and analysis of the structure and discussed possibilities yearly at the annual district conferences in his reports. Former General Superintendent Lucian Smith, one the EMC's founders, stated that the EMC took the Methodist Episcopal "Book of Discipline" and adapted it for the EMC at two points—property ownership by the local congregation and the call of the pastor. All of the historic Methodist connectional aspects remained, according to Smith.

In September 2007, the General Council (superintendents and other officials) unanimously proposed that the U.S. districts be changed into regions and merged into a single conference. This plan, called the "One Conference Model" and part of the CSP (Comprehensive Strategic Plan), was proposed to delegates at the Special General Conference in July 2008. According to this earlier plan, The General Conference would be held every three or four years and in-between General Conference years, two annual convocations would be held on the east and west coasts. The General Council pointed to the current level of independence of the various districts and deviation from the denomination's "Methodist moorings" of connectionalism. The motion to adopt the reorganization plan was approved but would have failed to gain the three-quarters support necessary for a revision in the Constitution, with 157-100 delegate votes (61.1 to 39.9%).

In Spring 2008, five of the six District Conferences supported the presentation of the one-conference model to the 2010 General Conference. The five churches which now comprise the congregational National Association of Wesleyan Evangelicals were originally part of the Southern District Conference—the one district which did not approve of the changes.

Upon approval of the two-conference model in 2010 the office of General Superintendent was made synonymous with the title of Bishop.

== Other EMCs ==
In addition to many freestanding local churches in the U.S. that go by the name "Evangelical Methodist," there are multiple associations that use the name, and one which shares a common heritage with the larger body.

=== Evangelical Methodist Church Conference ===
Campus of Oakland Mills Evangelical Methodist Church, a congregation of the Evangelical Methodist Church Conference (EMCC), located in Juniata County, Pennsylvania

The Evangelical Methodist Church Conference (EMCC) is a Methodist denomination within the conservative holiness movement that was organized in 1927 in central Pennsylvania by Pilgrim Holiness Church evangelists William Straub and Daniel Dubendorf. As of 2019 its General Superintendent was the Rev. Brent Lenhart. The denomination's annual camp meeting is held in July at the Oakland Mills Methodist Campground. The Evangelical Methodist Church Conference holds Lost Creek Youth Camp annually, in August, at the Oakland Mills Methodist Campground.

=== Evangelical (Independent) Methodist Churches of America ===
Though the Evangelical Methodist Church contained Holiness and non-Holiness Fundamentalists in its beginning, it experienced a schism early in its history in regard to the Wesleyan doctrine of sanctification and the security of the believer.

A faction led by W.W. Breckbill (a founder from the earliest days of the EMC) became known as either the Evangelical (Independent) Methodist Churches, the Fellowship of Evangelical Methodist Churches, the Evangelical Methodist Conference, or simply the Evangelical Methodist Church. The connection was established in 1953 by dissenting members of the EMC. They operate Breckbill Bible College in Max Meadows, Virginia, named for its preferred founder. This smaller EMC group is more into cultural separatism than the original denomination and does not teach the doctrine of Entire Sanctification as a crisis experience, but rather emphasizes it being the result of a gradual growth in grace. They are strictly congregationalist in polity. They have more things in common with the distinctly Fundamentalist Conservative Holiness Movement than does the larger EMC body. Dr. James B. Fields is the general superintendent of this group, which claims churches in Suriname, Jamaica, Chile, Nigeria, France, Kenya and Malawi in addition to 16 congregations in the United States. It is headquartered in Kingsport, Tennessee.

According to an observer, this schism mirrors a trend among many Protestant denominations:

"The history of the Evangelical Methodist Church illustrates the tensions inherent in a Fundamentalist-Holiness relationship. Founded in 1946 as a protest against growing liberalism in the Methodist Episcopal Church, the Evangelical Methodist Church contained both Holiness and non-Holiness factions. Eventually, the tension grew too great, and in 1952 the denomination split over the issue of entire sanctification. The non-Holiness segment, led by W. W. (William Wallace) Breckbill, took the more ardently Fundamentalist position, aligning itself with the American Council of Christian Churches, a Fundamentalist alliance. In this case, mutual opposition to liberalism was not sufficient to make up for deep differences over the doctrine of sanctification. Once the split took place, those opposed to entire sanctification [as restricted to a crisis experience alone, rather than either a crisis experience or occurring after a gradual growth in grace] found themselves more comfortable in the Fundamentalist camp. This story reproduces in miniature the general outline of Fundamentalist-Holiness interaction.

Internationally, there are many denominations unrelated to the U.S. EMCs which share the name, including Evangelical Methodist Church in Bolivia, Evangelical Methodist Church in the Philippine Islands, and others.
