= John Wesley University =

Coordinates: 35.9943°N 79.9984°W

- Former names: Greensboro Bible and Training School, Greensboro Bible and Literary Institute, People's Bible School, John Wesley College, Laurel University
- Motto: Learn. Grow. Impact.
- Type: Christian, Private
- Active: 1903–2018
- Location: High Point, North Carolina, United States
- Campus: Rural
- Nickname: Lions

John Wesley University was a private interdenominational Christian college in High Point, North Carolina, United States. In 2018, the university merged into Piedmont International University in Winston-Salem.

== Background ==
Known for many years as John Wesley College, the college changed its name to Laurel University in 2011 and John Wesley University in June 2016.

Some students lived on the rural campus, while others commuted. Classes were offered in person and online.

The university contained schools of management and ministry and created North Carolina's first state-accredited online MBA program using avatar technology with a virtual business internship experiences for students.

== History ==
John Wesley University was the oldest undergraduate theological education institution in North Carolina. It started in fall 1903 as the Greensboro Bible and Training School in Greensboro as a result of a revival held by Revs. Seth Rees and Charles Weigle. The school closed abruptly after the 1931 spring semester owing to insurmountable financial difficulties.

Following an all-night prayer service with well-known former Methodist Episcopal Church South evangelist Jim H. Green (1880-1955), the group decided to reopen the Greensboro Bible and Literary Institute on January 15, 1932 in the same facilities with many of the same teachers and students. The new name was People's Bible School.

The revamped school, which started with four faculty (from the previous institute) and 18 students, was later known as John Wesley College (1956), Laurel University (2011), and John Wesley University (2016). This college distributed the People's Herald periodical, later The Crusader. The college remained non-denominational while promoting a distinctively Wesleyan-Holiness view on entire sanctification, with fellow Methodist Evangelist John R. Church as its first board chairman.

The college was influential in the founding of the People's Methodist Church, which later merged with the Evangelical Methodist Church. A small "chain of tabernacles" was created so ministry students would have inexpensive venues to preach and conduct revival services during the Great Depression.

== Accreditation ==
John Wesley University was accredited with the Commission on Accreditation of The Association for Biblical Higher Education (ABHE), an institutional accrediting body recognized by the Council for Higher Education Accreditation (CHEA), and the United States Department of Education. Graduates of the Christian Elementary Education program are eligible for certification with the Association of Christian Schools International (ACSI).

The Bachelor of Arts in Management & Business Ethics and the Master of Business Administration—two degrees offered by the School of Management—were licensed by the University of North Carolina Office of General Administration.

== Academics ==
John Wesley University offered Associate, Bachelor, Master's, and doctoral degrees. Some bachelor's degree programs were designed specifically for adults to be completed at home or one night a week at school.

== Athletics ==
John Wesley University was a member of the National Christian College Athletic Association (NCCAA) and competed at the Division 1 level. Sports offered included:

- Men's Soccer
- Women's Soccer
- Women's Softball
- Women's Volleyball

In 2014, operating as Laurel University - school leadership made a decision to bring athletics on to the campus in order to boost low enrollment and create a campus culture. In the beginning stages the university chose Men's/Women's Soccer and Lacrosse. After trying a few different approaches and looking for coaches, the school hired its first soccer coach Zachary Pierce.

Pierce is a native of High Point, North Carolina, who thrived as youth player with the 75 High Point Stars, and as a four-year varsity starter at Ledford High School. In college, Pierce played for Johnson & Wales University and Louisburg College; after college, Pierce played briefly over overseas for a German club team Schwäbisch Hall. Returning from Europe and re-settling in High Point, Coach Pierce has been heavily involved with youth soccer for 20 years and remains a sought after, highly respected coach in the triad. During his youth coaching career Pierce garnered a winning record of 336-52-15, winning multiple cross state club titles.

As Laurel University's head men's coach, Pierce single-handedly built a thriving program in a short 6 months. He actively recruited 80 student - athletes to compete in the NAIA & NCCAA D1 Southern States Conference. Along with recruitment and team building, Pierce solely negotiated usage of AJ Stadium for home matches, and the local Hartley YMCA for training facilities. In the university's inaugural year, Pierce assumed the NAIA Southern States Conference game schedule from Virginia Intermont, whose campus closed. The inaugural season produced a hard earned record 5-12, with a varsity program and team composed entirely of freshman and playing NAIA powerhouses: Southern Wesleyan University, Salem International, The Cumberlands University, West Virginia Tech, Columbia International, St. Andrews University, High Point University and others. Pierce left the University after the first year. Later the program thrived under Pierces's former assistant Coach Golding.

== See also ==
- The People's Methodist Church
- Holiness movement
