= Fellowship of Fundamental Bible Churches =

- Classification: Christian
- Orientation: Methodist
- Theology: Wesleyan Methodist, with Baptist influence
- Associations: American Council of Christian Churches
- Origin: 1939
- Separated from: Methodist Protestant Church
- Official website: www.ffbchurches.org

The Fellowship of Fundamental Bible Churches (FFBC) is a fellowship of independent, autonomous, fundamental churches established in 1939. It is considered only a fellowship of like-minded churches, rather than a denomination. Local congregations in the fellowship have no financial obligations to the fellowship, and the fellowship exercises no control over them. It is only expected that the churches believe and teach an interpretation of the Bible consistent with the Fundamentals of the Faith.

The church originated in a split from the Methodist Protestant Church, which was in merger talks with the Methodist Episcopal Church and the Methodist Episcopal Church, South. The majority of Methodist Protestant congregations joined the two Methodist Episcopal bodies to form The Methodist Church, though the Eastern Conference of the Methodist Protestant Church reorganized as the Bible Protestant Church. It took its current name in 1985. Most of the Methodist Protestant congregations in the Mississippi Conference reorganized andcontinued as the Methodist Protestant Church in name, doctrine and practice.

Doctrinally, the FFBC professes to hold these distinctives: "Biblically literal in our interpretation; dispensational (not covenantal) in our theology; premillennial and pretribulational in our eschatology; evangelistic and missions-oriented in our outreach; Biblically separated in personal life and ecclesiastical associations, and baptistic with regard to the mode and subjects of baptism." They also oppose the Pentecostal and Charismatic movements, holding that spiritual gifts such as speaking in tongues were sign gifts that ceased to operate after the close of the New Testament canon.

Currently (2018), the FFBC comprises 18 churches spread out over New Jersey, Pennsylvania, New York, Michigan, and California. With a number of additional churches served by Ministerial Members of the FFBC. The fellowship operates the Tri-State Bible Camp & Conference Center in Montague, New Jersey. The Fellowship of Fundamental Bible Churches is a member of the American Council of Christian Churches.

The Fellowship of Fundamental Bible Churches is not to be confused with the International Fellowship of Bible Churches, another Wesleyan Methodist denomination with a similar name.
