= Waynesville =

Waynesville may refer to a place in the United States:

- Waynesville, Georgia
- Waynesville, Illinois
- Waynesville, Indiana
- Waynesville, Missouri
- Waynesville, North Carolina
- Waynesville, Ohio
