= Reformed Zion Union Apostolic Church =

Methodist Christian denomination

Coordinates: 36.70205°N 78.10950°W

Reformed Zion Union Apostolic Churches of America
- Classification: Protestant
- Orientation: Methodist
- Polity: Episcopal
- Leader: John L. Ghee
- Region: United States
- Founder: James R. Howell
- Origin: April 1, 1869; Boydton, VA
- Members: ?
- Official website: Official website

RZUA (Reformed Zion Union Apostolic Churches of America) is a Methodist Christian denomination with a predominantly African-American membership that resides mostly in the South Hill and Tidewater area of Virginia. It was founded in 1869 in Boydton, Virginia as the Zion Union Apostolic Church, and was reorganized as the Reformed Zion Union Apostolic Church in 1882. In 2023 it had 35 congregations.
