= Leroy Seat =

American theologian

Leroy Seat (born 1938 in Grant City, Missouri) is a former chancellor (1996–2004) and full-time faculty member of Seinan Gakuin University (1968–2004) in Fukuoka, Japan. He was a Baptist missionary to Japan from 1966 to 2004 and now lives in his home state of Missouri, where he conducts his public activities under the auspices of 4-L Ministries.

Seat is the founder and former president of the Seinan Gakuin 4-L Foundation, Inc., a non-profit organization seeking to help Seinan Gakuin fulfill its mission through supporting and enhancing the presence and witness of Christian teachers and other Christian workers at Seinan Gakuin.

== Selected works ==
- Fed Up with Fundamentalism: A Historical, Theological, and Personal Appraisal of Christian Fundamentalism (2007; rev. ed., 2020)
- The Limits of Liberalism: A Historical, Theological, and Personal Appraisal of Christian Liberalism (2010; rev. ed., 2020)
- Thirty True Things Everyone Needs to Know Now (2018)
- A Wonderful Life: The Story of My Life from Birth until My 82nd Birthday (1938~2020) (2020)
