= Bethel Methodist Church (denomination) =

Methodist Denomination from Texas, US

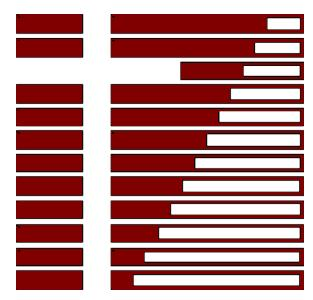
- Classification: Protestant (Methodist)
- Orientation: Evangelical, Holiness
- Polity: Congregational
- Region: Texas
- Origin: 1989
- Separated from: Evangelical Methodist Church
- Congregations: 4

The Bethel Methodist Church (BMC) is a Methodist denomination aligned with the Wesleyan-Holiness movement. It consists of four congregations in Texas.

== History ==
The Bethel Methodist Church separated from the Evangelical Methodist Church after a church trial called into question the theological stances of a handful of ministers.

The small denomination's Book of Discipline traces this theological dispute to the mid-1970s when "a widening tolerance of many different beliefs regarding the nature of God, man, angels, sin, salvation, sanctification and heaven" began to emerge.

After Rev. Arthur Slye Jr. was elected Mid-States District Superintendent in the 1980s, he "chose to preach some of his deepest-held truths to the District Conference at Irving." This raised many objections, which resulted in a "heresy trial" followed by repeated "attempts to clarify" by Slye and his supporters.

On August 16, 1988, five Evangelical Methodist Church ministers met in Hico, Texas, to determine a course of action. Their three churches in Irving, Port Neches, and Robinson would pull away from their parent denomination and form an Interchurch Council. Articles of Incorporation for the Bethel Methodist Church were filed with the State of Texas on February 27, 1989. Slye, pastor of the Irving church, was elected the new denomination's first General Superintendent. The first services were held on Easter Sunday, March 24, 1989.

== Beliefs ==
Bethel Methodist Church is for the most part Wesleyan-Holiness in doctrine—lamenting a Modernist trend in American Methodism.

Emphases include the Wesleyan-Arminian possibility of a Christian backsliding, as well as man's free will to choose or reject God. The denomination prefers baptism by sprinkling and pouring, rather than allowing for immersion as did the parent body. It does not practice infant baptism.

== Polity ==
Church government is largely congregational, though bound by a denominational constitution and bylaws.

== See also ==
- Evangelical Methodist Church
- Arminianism
