= New Methodist Conference =

Methodist denomination

- Classification: Methodism
- Orientation: High church
- Theology: Wesleyan
- Polity: Episcopal
- Origin: 2005
- Separated from: United Methodist Church
- Official website: New Methodist Conference (NMC)

The New Methodist Conference (NMC) is a Methodist denomination with a liturgically high church orientation.

The formation of the New Methodist Conference is a part of the history of Methodism in the United States. It originated as a schism with the United Methodist Church in 2005, being formed by Rob Jones and Deborah Giordano, who were formerly United Methodist clergy. The denomination ordains clergy in apostolic succession, which trace through Old Catholic lines of the historic episcopate; these include the threefold office of deacon, priest, and bishop. It does affirm the ordination of women in Methodism. The New Methodist Conference encourages expressions of Methodist Christian monasticism.

The name "New Methodist Conference" (later called the Evangelical Association) was used by the connexion established in the 1700s under the leadership of Jacob Albright, a Lutheran who converted to Methodism and was ordained in that denomination after accepting the Methodist teachings on the New Birth and entire sanctification.

== See also ==
- Holiness movement
