= American Council of Christian Churches =

The American Council of Christian Churches (ACCC) is a fundamentalist organization set up in opposition to the Federal Council of Churches (now National Council of Churches).

The council's motto is Jude 3, "Earnestly contending for the Faith".

== History ==
ACCC was founded in 1941 under the leadership of Carl McIntire.

Membership in the American Council of Christian Churches is available to denominations and individual Christians, who are admitted by a 3/4 majority vote. Agreement with the purposes and doctrinal statement are required and membership is specifically denied to those who have affiliations with

the World Council of Churches (WCC) or any of its affiliates, such as the National Council of the Churches of Christ in the U.S.A. (NCC), the World Evangelical Fellowship (WEF) or any of its affiliates, such as the National Association of Evangelicals (NAE), the modern Charismatic Movement, or the Ecumenical Movement...

The ACCC has remained small in comparison to the National Association of Evangelicals and the National Council of Churches. This is due in part to its strong separatist stance, and in part because separatist denominations will often not participate in "cross-denominational" organizations.

Dan Greenfield currently serves as Executive Secretary. Offices are in Orwell, Ohio.

In July 2007, the leadership of the ACCC issued a statement criticizing a recent declaration by the Congregation for the Doctrine of the Faith on the meaning of the phrase subsistit in which re-emphasized the role of the Catholic Church as the subsisting Church of Christ.

== Members – April 2019 ==
- Appalachian Independent Minister’s Fellowship
- Association of Ministers of the Reformed Faith
- Faith Presbytery, Bible Presbyterian Church
- Evangelical Methodist Church of America
- Fellowship of Fundamental Bible Churches
- Free Presbyterian Church of North America
- Fundamental Methodist Church
- Independent Baptist Fellowship of North America
- Independent Churches Affiliated

== Presidents ==
- Carl McIntire
- Robert T. Ketcham
- Harland J. O'Dell
- William Wallace Breckbill
- Clyde J. Kennedy (1958–1961)
- Don McKnight
- Richard Harris
- L. Duane Brown
- E. Allen Griffith
- John McKnight
- David Mook
- Jonathan Smith
