= Fundamental Methodist Conference =

- Classification: Methodism
- Orientation: Fundamental
- Polity: Congregational
- Origin: 1942; Greene County, Missouri
- Separated from: Methodist Church
- Official website: Fundamental Methodist Conference

The Fundamental Methodist Conference, is a Methodist denomination of Christianity. It organized in 1942.

In 2001 there were 814 members in 13 congregations. Its headquarters near Springfield, Missouri. The conference is a member of the American Council of Christian Churches.

It holds its annual conference at the Fundamental Methodist Conference Grounds near Ash Grove in Lawrence County, Missouri, where it hosts an active youth camp ministry. This body is a member of the American Council of Christian Churches.

The denomination publishes The Evangelical Methodist in conjunction with the likeminded Evangelical Methodist Church of America.

== Background ==
The Fundamental Methodist Conference was instituted at Ash Grove, Missouri, in 1942 under the name Independent Fundamental Methodist Church. The title was changed to Fundamental Methodist Church, Inc., when the first annual conference was held in 1944.

The Fundamental Methodist Conference traces its origins through the Methodist Protestant Church to the Anglican reformation and evangelical awakening of the Wesley brothers, John and Charles. The three major Methodist conferences in the United States – the Methodist Episcopal Church, Methodist Episcopal Church, South, and the Methodist Protestant churches – united under the name The Methodist Church in 1939. The union was attended with dissatisfaction among certain people in all three groups. The John's Chapel Church (formerly part of the Methodist Protestant Church) of Lawrence County, Missouri, withdrew from The Methodist Church on August 27, 1942, and elected a committee to draw up a constitution and by-laws for fundamental Methodists. On August 23, 1944, the first annual conference was held in Greene County, Missouri, with three churches representing. The denomination was chartered on February 27, 1948.

Unlike most other Methodists, the churches of the Fundamental Methodist Conference do not baptize infants, though the dedication of children is retained. They only observe the mode of immersion for baptism. Since they do not regard baptism as initiation to the universal church, they will receive members from other churches who have been baptized by sprinkling or pouring. Government is more congregational and less connectional than generally practiced by other Methodists (though some other Methodist denominations, such as the Congregational Methodist Church, have a congregational polity). Each congregation owns its property and calls its pastors. The church has no bishops; the Annual Conference elects a District Superintendent and a Secretary-Treasurer.

== Bibliography ==
- Handbook of Denominations (6th ed.), by Frank S. Mead
- History and Discipline of the Faith and Practice of the Fundamental Methodist Church (1980)
- Minutes of the Fundamental Methodist Conference, Inc., 2001
- Religious Congregations & Membership in the United States, 2000, Glenmary Research Center
