= Association of Independent Methodists =

Methodist Christian denomination founded in 1965

- Type: Protestantism
- Classification: Methodism
- Orientation: Wesleyan-Holiness
- Polity: Congregational
- Leader: Rev. Marshall Daigre, President
- Region: Worldwide (missions and 9 U.S. regions)
- Origin: 1965; Jackson, Mississippi
- Separated from: The Methodist Church
- Congregations: 123 in 13 U.S. states
- Official website: aim2020.com

The Association of Independent Methodists (AIM) is a fellowship of independent Methodist congregations that are aligned with the holiness movement. The Association is based in the United States, being founded in 1965 by churches who left the mainline Methodist Church because of disagreements on church government and doctrinal matters. As of 2024, the denomination has 123 churches in 13 U.S. states, concentrated mostly in the Southern United States.

== Beliefs ==
The Association of Independent Methodists maintains a statement of faith similar to other denominations of a Wesleyan-Holiness orientation with a Methodist heritage.

According to AIM's Statement of Faith: "The Bible is the infallible Word of God, inerrant in the originals. There is one God, eternally existent in three Persons—Father, Son, and Holy Spirit," and "Jesus Christ alone is Man's Redeemer and is the only way to salvation and everlasting life." Furthermore, the Association believes in Jesus' "full deity, virgin birth, atoning death, bodily resurrection, heavenly ascension, and imminent return".

Salvation is "by grace through faith in the atonement and merits of Christ, appropriated through the repentance of sins and a lively trust in Him".

Evangelical in belief, the Association states: "There is to be a resurrection of both the saved and the lost, the saved to everlasting life and the lost to everlasting damnation." True to the Wesleyan position, the Association adheres to a belief in entire sanctification: "The believer can be cleansed from all sin through the sanctifying power of the blood of Christ applied to the heart of him who believes by the work of the Holy Spirit." This is reflected in the theme of the small band of churches: "free salvation for all people and full salvation from all sin".

In terms of man's origins, the Association maintains: "The Biblical account of creation and all other supernatural acts of God recorded in the Scriptures are true," holding to an Arminian position that "man was created to be a free moral agent and remains so all the days of his life, with the God-given freedom to embrace or reject God throughout one's life in response to God's offer in prevenient grace."

The Association accepts the ordination of women as pastors in the Church, and credentials them for ministry.

The Association celebrates two Sacraments, common to other Methodist bodies: the Lord's Supper and Baptism, by method of choice.

== Polity ==
AIM is strictly congregational, stating, "We do not own the property of any local church; neither do we so desire." Ministers are screened and credentialed but not appointed to charges or pastorates and are subject to the vote of local congregations. Headquarters, camps, and missions are voluntarily supported by member churches (i.e., 'Associates') of AIM. There are no bishops, as president and an elected board (i.e., 'Executive Committee') oversee the affairs of the connection of churches.

== Affiliations ==
AIM has affiliations with Wesley Biblical Seminary and Kentucky Mountain Bible College and keeps ecumenical relations with the Congregational Methodist Church, the National Association of Wesleyan Evangelicals, and the Methodist Protestant Church, as well as the missionary-sending organization World Gospel Mission and is a member of the Global Wesleyan Alliance.

== See also ==
- Fellowship of Independent Methodist Churches
