= Methodist Church in Chile =

The Methodist Church in Chile was founded by missionaries from the United States. The mission came under the Methodist Episcopal Church.In 1901 the Chile district become a conference. In 1969 it became autonomous. The church maintains relationship with the United Methodist Church. It has almost 10,000 members and 90 congregations, served by 80 pastors in 2006.
