= Evangelical Methodist Church in Bolivia =

Evangelical Methodist Church in Bolivia (Iglesia Evangélica Metodista Bolivia) is a Christian denomination which was founded by American Methodist missionaries in 1906. The work progressed and in 1969 it became autonomous.

In 2006, IEMB received the ‘Order of the Condor’ from the Bolivian government. At that time, the denomination had 9,000 members and 188 congregations.

In 2023, the denomination had 9,190 members across 194 congregations. The majority of members are from indigenous groups including Aymaras, Quechuas, Tupiguarinies, and other peoples.

In 2023, the denomination is part of the World Methodist Council and the World Federation of Methodist and Uniting Church Women.
