= J. H. Hamblen =

James Henry Hamblen
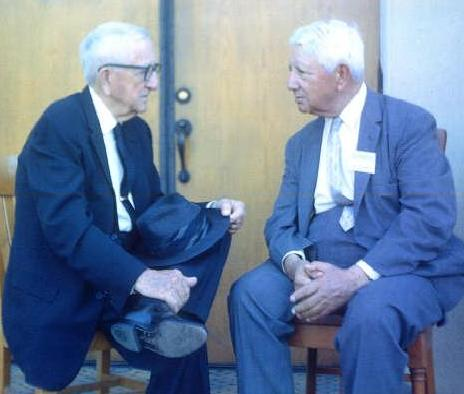
- J.H. Hamblen (left) with Dr. Ezekiel Vargas (right) in this undated picture
- Born: November 13, 1877; United States
- Died: November 7, 1971 (aged 93); Abilene, Texas, US
- Occupations: Evangelist, Founder of the Evangelical Methodist Church
- Family: Stuart Hamblen (son)

Dr. James Henry Hamblen (November 13, 1877 – November 7, 1971) was an American pastor of the Methodist Episcopal Church, South in Texas, an evangelist and revivalist preacher, and subsequent to 1946, was the founder of the Evangelical Methodist Church. He was the father of performer and songwriter Stuart Hamblen.

== Biography ==
The son of a Civil War veteran, Hamblen spent his young life as a farmer along with his family in East Texas and briefly in Arkansas. Soon after deciding to enter the ministry in the Methodist Church, he married Alvin Earnest Williams. The couple had six children, Lola Mae, Oberia Matilda, Alvin Kelley, Carl Stuart, James Estel "Ebb" and John Henry.

After a long career as an itinerant Methodist circuit preacher, church planter, and pastor in East, North Central, and West Texas, Hamblen was stationed at First Methodist Church, Abilene, Texas, where he served two stints. Following disagreement over the doctrinal content of Vacation Bible School and Sunday School curriculum during the 1940s, Hamblen had opted for his teachers to teach directly from the Bible because he was concerned about Modernism in the books. Hamblen made his objections known and the leadership of the Northwest Texas Conference of the Methodist Church sought to transfer Hamblen to a smaller church far away from Abilene. Rather than accept the reassignment, Hamblen invoked a rule which allowed Methodist ministers to take a sabbatical year. During this year, Hamblen began preaching to a group of about 20 persons who had left First Methodist Church of Abilene and met in a nearby home. This violated the Methodist Book of Discipline and at the next conference Hamblen was called before a cabinet of bishops to answer for his actions.

Hamblen resigned from the conference floor ending four decades of service to the denomination announcing "I could not conscientiously remain in a church where modernism predominated and where the leaders did not believe in and uphold the Articles of Religion of Methodism; where the Sunday School literature was filled with doubt of the inspiration of the Bible and the fundamental doctrines of evangelical Christianity; where the young preachers trained in our Methodist Divinity Schools no longer believed the cardinal doctrines of our church". Hamblen's withdrawal caught the eye of the national media, and Bishop Charles Claude Selecman defended that Methodist Church curriculum "did not contain a single line denying the divinity of Christ, the old-time gospel has been preached at the sessions here" and that there has not been "a single line appearing in our Sunday School literature challenging the fundamentals of our church."

After organizing his house church as the First Evangelical Methodist Church of Abilene, Hamblen reported that he received many letters and telegrams from interested parties from around the nation and the world expressing sympathy for his stand and surrendering his pension and retirement benefits in order to leave the Methodist Church on principle. On May 9, 1946, his sympathizers and other allies gathered in Memphis, Tennessee to form the Evangelical Methodist Church denomination. Hamblen served as first general superintendent and later superintendent emeritus until his death in 1971.

Shortly after the formation of the Evangelical Methodist Church in 1949, Hamblen received some attention following Billy Graham's breakout Los Angeles Crusade. Hamblen's son Stuart Hamblen, a composer and singer having penned and performed popular songs as one of radio's first "singing cowboys", was among the roughly 3,000 people who dedicated themselves to the Christian faith at the tent revival. Stuart Hamblen, known then for his racing horses and penchant for alcohol, was the first of several "celebrity conversions" including Louis Zamperini and a handful of actors and their friends. Stuart Hamblen soon gave up gambling and drinking, and he went on to record Christian standards such as "This Ole House" and "It Is No Secret (What God Can Do)"; run for Congress; and run for president of the United States on the 1952 Prohibition Party ticket. The elder Hamblen was a guest preacher at one of Graham's Crusades following the high-profile turnaround of his son and the answer of a father's lifetime of prayer.

== Bibliography ==
- J. H. Hamblen, "A Look into Life: An Autobiography" (Abliene, Tex.: J.H. Hamblen, 1969)
