= Methodist Church (United States) =

Methodist denomination

- Classification: Mainline Protestant and Evangelical
- Orientation: Methodism
- Polity: Connectionalism (modified episcopal polity)
- Associations: Federal Council of Churches
- Merger of: Methodist Episcopal Church the Methodist Episcopal Church, South and the Methodist Protestant Church (1939)
- Separations: Bible Protestant Church (1939); Fundamental Methodist Conference, Inc. (1942); Evangelical Methodist Church (1945); Association of Independent Methodists (1965)
- Merged into: United Methodist Church (1968)

The Methodist Church was the official name adopted by the Methodist denomination formed in the United States by the reunion on May 10, 1939, of the northern and southern factions of the Methodist Episcopal Church along with the earlier separated Methodist Protestant Church of 1828. The Methodist Episcopal Church had split in 1844 over the issue of slavery and the impending Civil War in America. During the American Civil War, the southern denomination was known briefly as the Methodist Episcopal Church in the Confederate States of America.

Its book of liturgy used for the reunited denomination was The Book of Worship for Church and Home, editions of which were published in 1945 and later revised in 1965. They had two official hymnals, the first being The Methodist Hymnal, published in 1935 and 1939 by the same three church bodies that later became The Methodist Church. It was replaced in 1966 by The Book of Hymns.

The Methodist Church then later merged with the Evangelical United Brethren Church on April 23, 1968, to form the United Methodist Church (UMC) with its headquarters, offices and publishing houses in Nashville, Tennessee. Over the next few years most of the individual local congregations in the two bodies under the names of "Methodist Church" or "Evangelical United Brethren Church" changed the latter part of their name to: "------ United Methodist Church". The new UMC became one of the largest and most widespread denominations in America. Earlier in 1946, some Methodists formed the Evangelical Methodist Church, separating from the Methodist Church, citing the influence of modernism in that church as the reason for entering into schism.
