= Free Methodist Church in Malaysia =

Methodist denomination in Malaysia

- Classification: Protestant
- Orientation: Methodist Holiness
- Polity: Connexional
- Leader: Rev. Henry Ng
- Associations: Free Methodist World Missions
- Region: Malaysia
- Origin: 2002
- Branched from: Free Methodist Church of North America
- Congregations: 6
- Members: 240
- Ministers: 6 (incl. ministerial candidates)

The Free Methodist Church in Malaysia is a body within the Methodist Holiness tradition in Malaysia, and a mission district of the Free Methodist Church of North America. It is Evangelical in nature and has its roots in the Wesleyan-Arminian tradition. The Free Methodist Church in Malaysia is led by the Rev. Henry Ng.

The other body of Methodists in Malaysia is the Methodist Church in Malaysia which had been established since 1885.

== History ==
The Free Methodist Church was first organised in Pekin, New York, in 1860 by former members of the Methodist Episcopal Church who had been expelled for too earnestly advocating what they saw as the doctrines and practices of authentic Wesleyanism. The church was initially led by the Rev B. T. Roberts, a graduate of Wesleyan University. The primary points of dissent was on the issue of slavery, the theology of Sanctification and pew rental, a practice whereby the best seats in a church was auctioned to the highest bidder as a means to raise funds, that was prevalent in the Methodist Episcopal Church then.

In 2002, the Free Methodist Church in Malaysia was dedicated and officiated in Ipoh, Perak as a mission of the Free Methodist World Missions. In 2008, the Free Methodist Church in Malaysia was recognised as a mission district of the Free Methodist World Missions and now has 6 organised churches with the main church in Ipoh having English, Chinese and Malay speaking congregations.

== Beliefs and practices ==
The Free Methodist Church shares the same doctrinal standards of evangelical Arminian Protestant Christianity and subscribes to the Methodist Articles of Religion, with emphasis on the teaching of entire sanctification as taught by John Wesley and are more overtly Arminian.

Generally, Free Methodists tend to be considered more conservative than the mainline Methodists.

== Organisation ==
=== Governance ===
The Free Methodist Church's highest governing body is the Free Methodist World Conference. The Free Methodist Church in Malaysia is organised as a mission district of the Free Methodist World Missions and has yet to attain full autonomy as an Annual Conference or General Conference. As such it is ecclesiastically accountable to the Free Methodist World Missions as well as the Pacific Coast Japanese Conference of the Free Methodist Church of North America.

=== Missions ===
The Free Methodist Church in Malaysia currently sponsors children through International Child Care Ministries and has established mission work amongst the indigenous people of East Malaysia.

== See also ==
- Christianity in Malaysia
- Status of religious freedom in Malaysia
