= Free Methodist Church in Canada =

The Free Methodist Church is a denomination of Methodism, which is a branch of Protestantism. It was founded in 1860 in New York by a group, led by B. T. Roberts, who was defrocked in the Methodist Episcopal Church for criticisms of the spiritual laxness of the church hierarchy. The Free Methodists are so named because they believed it was improper to charge for better seats in pews closer to the pulpit. They also opposed slavery and supported freedom for all slaves in the United States, while many Methodists in the South at that time did not actively oppose slavery. Beyond that, they advocated "freedom" from secret societies (e.g., Freemasons), which had allegedly undermined parts of the Methodist Episcopal Church.

== Background ==
The Free Methodist Church's roots are in the United States. At first the church consisted of many former Methodist Episcopal people who had been actively involved in the Underground Railroad just prior to the American Civil War, which had sought to aid escaped slaves gain safety and freedom in Canada. Some of the stations are still centres of Free Methodist activity today, such as North Chili, New York, site of present-day Roberts Wesleyan College, a Free Methodist school named after the founder. From there fugitive slaves were taken to Lake Ontario and boated across to Canada. Another Underground Railroad site was Pekin, New York, near the Niagara River, where slaves also crossed. This tiny town was the site of a Holiness camp meeting, as well, and the site of the organizational conference of the church in 1860. The denomination also has numerous churches in the U.S. Midwest, some of the oldest ones also being in communities that were abolitionist centers and Underground Railroad stops along the southern shore of Lake Michigan.

Today, the Free Methodist Church is considered to be a part of Evangelical Protestant Christianity, and its theology is similar to that of the Wesleyan Church, the Church of the Nazarene and other Holiness churches.

== History ==
Prior to the emergence of the Free Methodist Church in Canada, Methodism had already had a long history in Canadian society. Methodism came to Canada through the influence of Paul and Barbara Heck. Originating in Germany, the Hecks had emigrated first to Ireland, where Barbara was converted at the age of 28 under Methodist preaching, possibly that of John Wesley himself.

In the early 1760s, they sailed for New York, along with Barbara's cousin Philip Embury and his family. During the time of the American Revolution, Paul and Barbara Heck and Philip Embury's widow, Mary, and their son, fled to the Prescott area of Upper Canada. Remembering the protection they had received under the British Crown when they had fled from Germany to Ireland, they now joined the movement into Canada of thousands of United Empire Loyalists whose loyalties to Britain would not allow them to join the rebel cause in the colonies. So it was that Paul Heck was present when the first Canadian Methodist circuit was organized in 1791, the year of John Wesley's death.

The Methodist cause spread rapidly in Canada. Within 90 years, and after two mergers, there were five different non-ethnic branches: the Methodist Church of Canada, Methodist Episcopal Church, Primitive Methodist Church, Bible Christian Church and the infant Free Methodist Church. The first four merged into one Methodist body in 1883. This body later merged with Congregationalists and a significant number of Presbyterians to become the United Church of Canada in 1925.

In the fall of 1873 and winter of 1874, General Superintendent B. T. Roberts visited the area just north and east of the city of Toronto, the then township of Scarborough, on the invitation of Robert Loveless, a Primitive Methodist layman. Later, in 1876 while presiding over the very young North Michigan Conference, he read conference appointments that assigned C.H. Sage his field of labour—Canada.

Reluctantly, Sage came to southwestern Ontario. He was well received by disaffected Methodists, unhappy with the direction in which the larger Methodist bodies were moving. He preached a gospel calling men and women to conversion and the unconverted responded in encouraging numbers.

His preaching took him as far north as the Muskoka region. By 1880, the Canada Conference consisted of two districts, 11 societies, 13 preaching points and 324 members. In the early years, the work grew rapidly. Churches were formed in eastern Ontario. By the early 20th century it had spread to the prairies of western Canada. Both men and women joined in ministry leadership with Sage during these early years. In 1882 10 women are listed with church ministry responsibilities, unusual in mainstream Christianity, but fairly common in the Holiness and Pentecostal traditions. See Women in Christianity

By 1920, there was an impetus to consolidate as a distinctly Canadian body. The result was the All Canada Conference — a gathering of western and eastern leaders in Sarnia, Ontario. It was a landmark event of praying, planning and dreaming. Out of that meeting came such results as the formation of a Canadian Executive Board to manage distinctly Canadian matters, the launching of the Canadian Free Methodist Herald, and the establishment of Lorne Park College near Port Credit, Ontario. The passing of a Federal Act of Incorporation in 1927 was also largely traceable to the All Canada Conference in Sarnia. In 1940, Aldersgate College was founded in Moose Jaw, Saskatchewan, another result of the vision generated at the All Canada Conference.

The Free Methodist Church in Canada was further strengthened in 1959 by a merger with the Holiness Movement Church. This latter denomination was the product of revivals in the Methodist churches of the Ottawa Valley under Ralph C Horner during the waning years of the 19th century. This union, brought about by the labour of strong leaders in both bodies enlarged the world vision of the Canadian church by adding missionary concerns in Egypt, Brazil and Northern Ireland, fields the Holiness Movement Church had established.

In the early 1970s Canadian Free Methodist leaders applied to the Free Methodist Church of North America requesting authorization for the Canadian Church to become a general conference in its own right. Consultation resulted in the establishment of a Canadian Jurisdictional Conference, a halfway step, which came into being in August 1974. At the General Conference of 1989, held in Seattle, Washington, the Canadian Jurisdictional Conference was authorized to form as a General Conference. On August 6, 1990, the Canadian General Conference was inaugurated in Mississauga, Ontario. At the Second General Conference of the Free Methodist Church in Canada, held in 1993, the British Columbia District of the Pacific Northwest Conference became a part of the Free Methodist Church in Canada.

A further action was taken in December 1994, which merged the four Canadian Annual Conferences. Having become effective January 1, 1995, this action left one centralized location for denomination ministry and the discontinuance of regional offices.

== The Bishops of the Free Methodist Church in Canada ==
- Donald N. Bastian 1974–1993
- Gary R. Walsh 1993–1997; left to become President of the Evangelical Fellowship of Canada
- Keith A. Elford 1997–2017
- Cliff Fletcher 2017–2024
- Linda Adams 2024–
