= Keith A. Elford =

Keith Elford is a former Bishop Emeritus of the Free Methodist Church in Canada (FMCIC).

Prior to becoming bishop in June 1997, Elford was in the pastorate for 24 years, serving as Senior Pastor of Calgary Free Methodist Church at the time of his appointment. His earlier positions included Moose Jaw, Saskatchewan; Whitby, Ontario; and a church plant in North York, Ontario. While pastoring in Moose Jaw, he doubled as chaplain of Aldersgate College. Elford also served the international ministry of the Free Methodist Church as President of the Free Methodist World Conference from 1999 to 2007 and remained on its Executive in various other roles until 2015. He retired in May, 2017.

He holds a B.A. from Spring Arbor College in Michigan and an M.A. from Canadian Theological Seminary in Regina, Saskatchewan. He has an honorary doctorate from Tyndale Theological Seminary, Toronto. He has been a regular columnist in The Free Methodist Herald for many years.

Keith and his wife, Donna, have two adult children, Rebecca and Greg. Greg is a pastor in a Free Methodist Church in British Columbia.
