= The Life with God Study Bible =

The Life with God Bible is a study Bible published by Harper in 2005, and utilizes the New Revised Standard Version (NRSV). It was formerly published under the name Renovaré Spiritual Formation Bible, but has been republished under the Life with God title.

There are two editions of the Bible; one including the Deuterocanonical books, and another without them.

== Editors ==
Editors and contributors include Walter Brueggemann, Marva Dawn, Richard Foster, James Earl Massey, Thomas Oden, Eugene Peterson, Andrew Purves, Dallas Willard, William Willimon, and Ben Witherington III.

== See also ==
- Renovaré
