= Methodist Theological School =

Religious school

- Established: 1954
- Location: Sibu, Malaysia
- Website: http://www.mtssibu.edu.my/

Methodist Theological School (MTS) is a denominational theological school affiliated with the Methodist Church in Malaysia. It is located in the town of Sibu, Sarawak, Malaysia. Established in 1954, MTS is accredited by the Association for Theological Education in South East Asia (ATESEA).

== Organization ==
MTS is an institution of the Sarawak Chinese Annual conference (SCAC), the Sarawak Iban Annual conference (SIAC) and the Sabah Annual Conference (SAC) of the Methodist Church in Malaysia. It is directly responsible to a joint Board of Management, which includes the Bishop of the Methodist Church, and serves the two annual conferences accordingly. The principal and all the faculty members (except for part-time) are under appointment by these two annual conferences.

The key personnel of the MTS are:

- Principal: Khoo Ho Peng
- Academic Dean: Ling Tung Kiing
- Dean of Students: Thomas Lau Sie Ngiu
- Dean of Field Education: Su Chii Ann
- Dean of Theological Education by Extension: Francis Wong King Sing

== Programs ==
MTS offers academic programs leading to the awarding of the following qualifications:

=== Undergraduate ===
- Licentiate of Theology: This is a two-year 60 credit-hour course
- Diploma in Theology: This is a three-year 90 credit-hour course and a one-year service in full-time ministry or one upgrading paper is required upon graduation
- Bachelor of Theology: This is a four-year course of 120 credit hours
- Bachelor of Divinity: This is a four-year course of 120 credit hours

=== Postgraduate ===
- Master of Divinity: This program is a first theological degree for students who have attained a bachelor's degree and is a three-year course.

== Accreditation ==
The following programs offered by MTS are accredited by the ATESEA:

- Licentiate of Theology
- Bachelor of Theology
- Bachelor of Divinity
- Master of Divinity

MBTS is a founding member of the Malaysian Association of Theological Schools which allows a certain number of credits in the undergraduate programs to be transferable among member schools.
