= Osaka Christian College =

- 大阪キリスト教短期大学
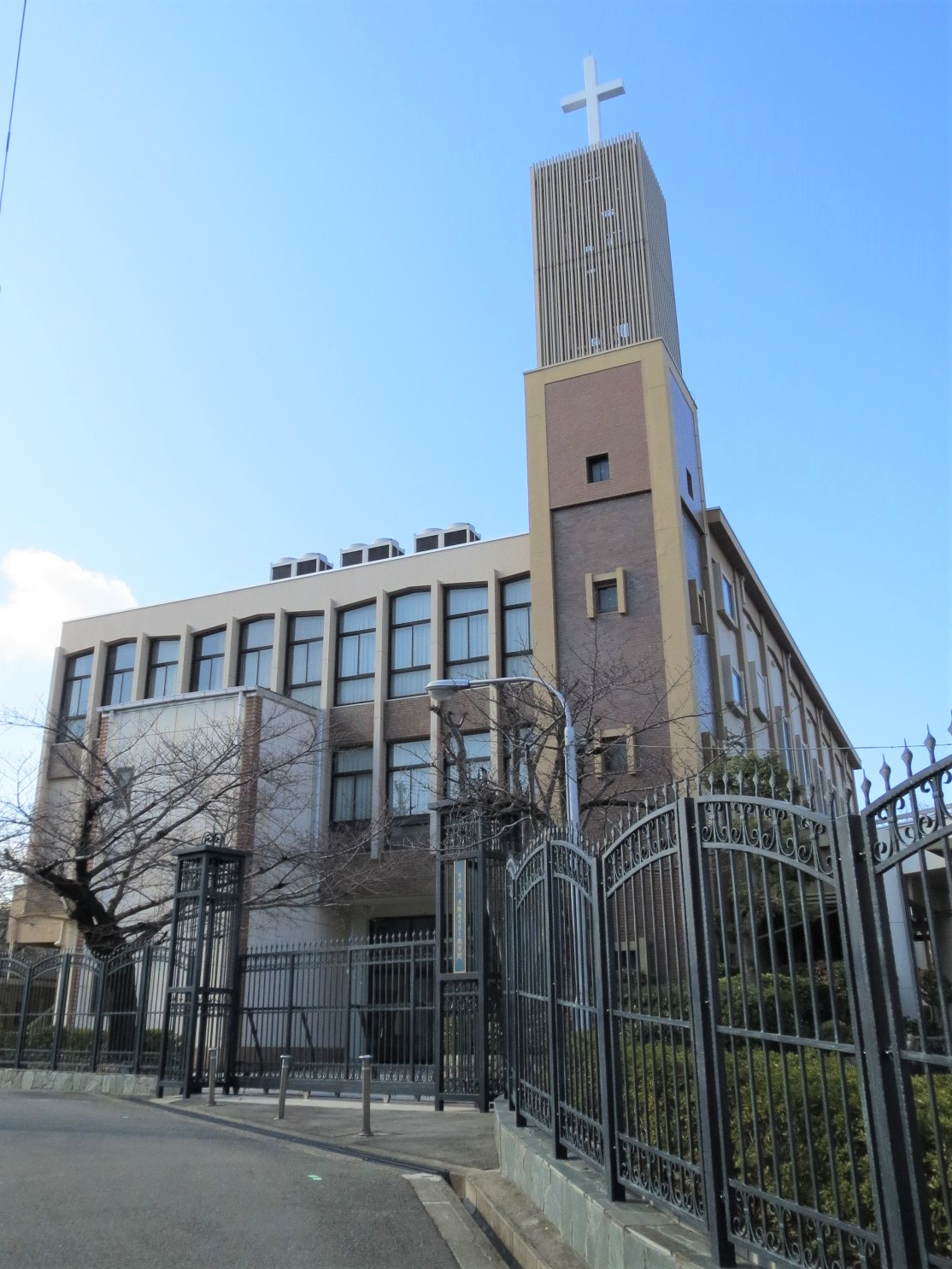
- Osaka Christian College
- Type: Private
- Established: 1952
- Religious affiliation: Christianity
- Location: Osaka, Japan; 34.636964°N 135.507469°E

Osaka Christian College (大阪キリスト教短期大学, Ōsaka kirisuto-kyō tanki daigaku) is a private junior college in Osaka, Osaka, Japan, established in 1952. Its primary focus has been training young women for teaching careers, and it has an exchange program with Roberts Wesleyan College in Rochester, New York. It is affiliated with the Free Methodist Church and has a related graduate school of theology for training of pastors.
