= Fullam =

Fullam is a surname, and may refer to:

- Bob Fullam (1897–1974), Irish footballer
- Everett L. Fullam (1930–2014), Episcopalian priest and scholar
- John P. Fullam (1921-2018), American judge
- Johnny Fullam (1940–2015), Irish association footballer
- Patrick Fullam (1847–1924), Irish nationalist politician
- William Fullam (1855–1926), American naval officer
