= Paul Shewan =

American classical trumpeter

Paul Shewan is an American classical trumpeter who currently plays for the Rochester Philharmonic Orchestra. He is also the Instrumental Music Chair at Roberts Wesleyan College, where he is the Professor of Trumpet as well as the Wind Ensemble and Orchestra conductor.
