= Dallas Willard =

American philosopher (1935–2013)

Dallas Albert Willard
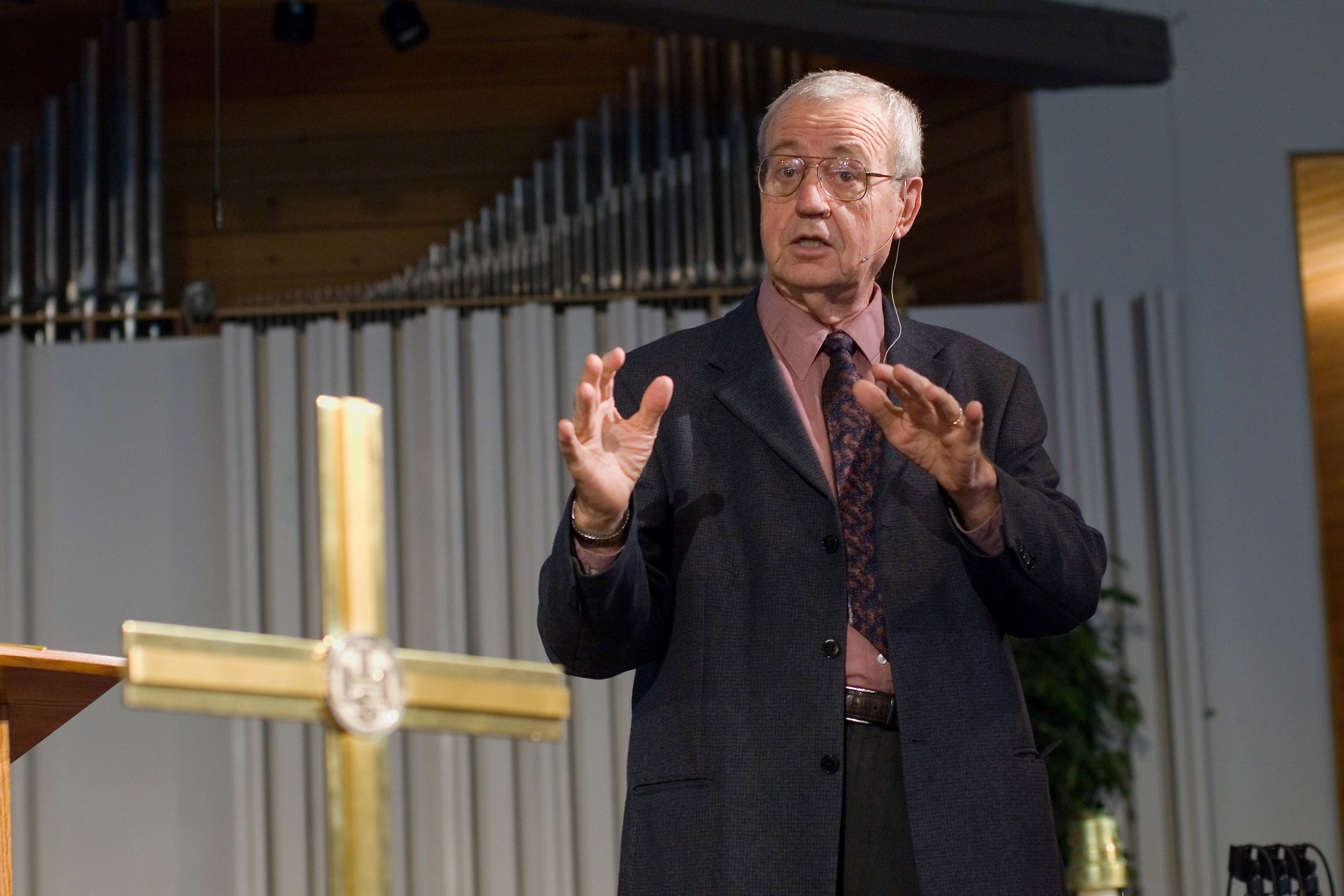
- Willard giving a Ministry-in-Contemporary-Culture Seminar at the George Fox Evangelical Seminary in Portland, Oregon, in 2008
- Born: September 4, 1935; Buffalo, Missouri, U.S.
- Died: May 8, 2013 (aged 77); Pasadena, California, U.S.

Academic background
- Education: Tennessee Temple University (BA); Baylor University (BA); University of Wisconsin–Madison (PhD)
- Thesis: Meaning and Universals In Husserl's 'Logische Untersuchungen' (1964)
- Academic advisor: W. H. Hay

Academic work
- Institutions: William Jewell College, Tennessee Temple College, Baylor University, University of Wisconsin–Madison.
- Main interests: phenomenology, Edmund Husserl
- Website: www.dwillard.org

Dallas Albert Willard (September 4, 1935 – May 8, 2013) was an American philosopher also known for his writings on Christian spiritual formation. Much of his work in philosophy was related to phenomenology, particularly the work of Edmund Husserl, many of whose writings he translated into English for the first time.

He was a professor of philosophy at the University of Southern California in Los Angeles, teaching at the school from 1965 until his death in 2013 and serving as the department chair from 1982 to 1985.

== Education ==
Willard attended William Jewell College, and later graduated from Tennessee Temple College in 1956 with a B.A. in psychology, and from Baylor University in 1957 with a B.A. in Philosophy and Religion. He went to graduate school at Baylor University and the University of Wisconsin–Madison, earning a Ph.D. in philosophy from the University of Wisconsin with a minor in the History of Science, with the dissertation "Meaning and Universals In Husserl's 'Logische Untersuchungen'" in 1964.

== Academic career ==
Willard spent five years teaching at the University of Wisconsin–Madison, first as a research and teaching assistant (1960–63), then as an Advanced Knapp Fellow (63–64), and finally as an instructor in philosophy (64–65). He then moved to the University of Southern California (USC) in Los Angeles, where he taught as an assistant professor (1965–69), as an associate professor (69–84), and finally as a full professor (1984–2013). He spent a total of 48 years at USC.

He served as director of the School of Philosophy at USC from 1982 to 1985, as well as visiting appointments at UCLA (1969) and the University of Colorado (1984).

His publications in philosophy are concerned primarily with epistemology, the philosophy of mind and of logic, and with the philosophy of Edmund Husserl, the founder of phenomenology. He translated many of Husserl's early writings from German into English, and is widely regarded as an international authority on the philosopher's works, which span from the topics of time-consciousness to intentionality and intuition in Cartesian thought.

== Awards ==
- Member of numerous evaluation committees for the Western Association of Schools and Colleges (accreditation)
- Danforth Associate 1967–1975
- Recipient (1976) of Blue Key National Honor Fraternity's "Outstanding Faculty Member" award for outstanding contributions to student life at USC
- USC Associates Award for Excellence in Teaching, 1976–1977
- Faculty participant in the COLLEGIUM PHAENOMENOLOGICUM at Monteripido (Perugia, Italy), summer 1977
- USC Student Senate Award for Outstanding Faculty of the Year, 1984
- Phi Kappa Phi National Honor Society, Initiation in May 1990
- Lecturer in Corsi Estivi Internazionali di Filosofia, Bozen, Italy, 1990 & 1998
- Alpha Lambda Delta National Honor Society, Initiation May 1991
- Gamma Sigma Alpha Professor of the Year Award Fall 2000.

== Other work ==
In addition to teaching and writing about philosophy, Willard gave lectures and wrote books about Christianity and Christian living. His book The Divine Conspiracy was Christianity Today’s Book of the Year for 1999. Another of his books, Renovation of the Heart, won Christianity Today’s 2003 Book Award for books on Spirituality and The Association of Logos Bookstores' 2003 Book Award for books on Christian Living.

Willard believed passivity to be a widespread problem in the Church (loosely summed up in his phrase "Grace is not opposed to effort {which is action}, but to earning {which is attitude}"). He emphasized the importance of deliberately choosing to be a disciple of Jesus Christ (someone being with Jesus, learning to be like him). An important outgrowth of the choice to be identified as a disciple of Jesus is the desire to learn about activities that aid spiritual transformation into the likeness of Christ.

In this regard, being an apprentice of Jesus (someone being with Jesus, learning to be like him), involves learning about activities that might help one grow in the fruit of the spirit, namely love, joy, peace, patience, kindness, goodness, faithfulness, gentleness, and self-control (Galatians 5:22-23). Such activities might include spiritual exercises practiced throughout the ages such as prayer, fellowship, service, study, simplicity, chastity, solitude, and fasting. Willard explains the crucial role of engaging in spiritual exercises in his book The Spirit of the Disciplines: Understanding How God Changes Lives—a book that was written after In Search of Guidance: Developing a Conversational Relationship with God.

Willard has a recommended reading page on his website listing specific titles by Thomas a Kempis, William Law, Frank Laubach, William Wilberforce, Richard Baxter, Charles Finney, Jan Johnson, Dietrich Bonhoeffer, Jeremy Taylor, Richard Foster, E. Stanley Jones, William Penn, Brother Lawrence, Francis de Sales, James Gilchrist Lawson, and others.

He was influenced by many, including Jacques Maritain, Aquinas, Augustine, P.T. Forsyth, John Calvin, John Wesley, William Law, Andrew Murray, Richard Baxter, Teresa of Avila, Francis de Sales, Brother Lawrence, and the Rule of St. Benedict.

He served on the boards of the C.S. Lewis Foundation and of Biola University. He also served on the board of the Templeton foundation, and on multiple evaluation committees for the Western Association of Schools and colleges.

== Personal life ==
Willard was born in Buffalo, Missouri on September 4, 1935, the son of Albert Willard and Maymie Lindesmith. His mother died when he was two years old. He married Jane Lakes of Macon, Georgia, in 1955. He had two children, John and Rebecca, and a granddaughter, Larissa. His brother, L. Duane Willard, was also for many years a tenured professor of philosophy at the University of Nebraska Omaha.

Willard struggled with balancing academic and family life. He once remarked, "I have not been a wise husband or father, and this has cost us dearly." Nonetheless, his daughter commented that he was a “great example of unconditional fatherly love." His wife Jane, a marriage and family therapist, said "I certainly don't feel unloved, at least at this juncture … Always down deep in my formation was this thing before God of 'I cannot stand in his way.'”

Willard died on May 8, 2013, after a short battle with cancer.

== Impact ==
- In 2010, Westmont College established the “Martin Institute for Christianity and Culture and the Dallas Willard Center for Spiritual Formation.” The institute is “dedicated to the intellectual Legacy of Willard”.
- Willard was active in the establishment of the Christian spiritual formation ministry, Renovare.
- Willard had an impact on the vision and establishment of The Apprentice Institute for Christian Spiritual Formation, which intends to carry out Willard's vision of Trinitarian and Christocentric spiritual formation.
- Dallas Willard Ministries exists for the purpose of carrying out the vision and extension of Willard's worldview and approach to Christian Discipleship.
- Dallas Willard Ministries and North Eastern Seminary partnered together to create the Dallas Willard Ministries School of Kingdom Living which also intends to extend and achieve the vision that Willard had for helping people to become apprentices of Jesus.
- Willard is known for having closely worked with and influenced the work and writings of Richard J. Foster.
- Willard is also noted for having heavily influenced the theology, praxis, and writings of James Bryan Smith, John Mark Comer, E. James Wilder, Hugh Halter, and Christian theologian and philosopher J.P. Moreland among others.

== Selected publications ==
=== Translations of works by Husserl ===
- Philosophy of Logic and Mathematics (1993). Dordrecht/Boston: Kluwer Academic Publishers, ISBN 0-7923-2262-2
- Philosophy of Arithmetic, (2003). Dordrecht: Kluwer Academic Publishers, ISBN 1-4020-1546-1 (Hardbound), ISBN 1-4020-1603-4 (paperback)

=== Popular books ===
- The Spirit of the Disciplines: Understanding How God Changes Lives (1988). San Francisco: Harper and Row, ISBN 0-06-069442-4
- The Divine Conspiracy: Rediscovering Our Hidden Life in God (1998). San Francisco: Harper, ISBN 0-06-069333-9
- Dallas Willard's Study Guide to The Divine Conspiracy Jan Johnson, Keith J. Matthews, and Dallas Willard (2001). HarperOne, ISBN 0060641002
- Hearing God: Developing a Conversational Relationship With God (1999). InterVarsity Press (USA), ISBN 0-8308-2226-7 (formerly titled In Search of Guidance: Understanding How God Changes Lives ISBN 0-06-069520-X)
- In Cautarea Calauzirii (1990). Wheaton, IL: Societatea Misionara Romana.
- The Spirit of the Disciplines (1988). San Francisco: Harper and Row; Korean translation (1993); U.K. edition (1996).
- The Divine Conspiracy (1998) San Francisco: Harper; U.K. edition (1999) HarperCollins. ISBN 000-6281141
- Renovation of the Heart: Putting on the Character of Christ (2002). Colorado Springs: NavPress, ISBN 1-57683-296-1
- Renovation of the Heart In Daily Practice: Experiments in Transformation with Jan Johnson (2006). Colorado Springs: NavPress, ISBN 1576838099
- The Great Omission: Reclaiming Jesus's Essential Teachings on Discipleship (2006). San Francisco: Harper, ISBN 0-06-088243-3
- Knowing Christ Today: Why We Can Trust Spiritual Knowledge (2009). San Francisco: Harper, ISBN 978-0-06-088244-0; British edition: Personal Religion, Public Reality: Toward a Knowledge of Faith (2009). London: Hodder & Stoughton Ltd.
- Hearing God: Developing a Conversational Relationship with God (2012) Westmont, IL: InterVarsity Press, ISBN 978-0-8308-3569-0
- The Allure of Gentleness: Defending the Faith in the Manner of Jesus (2015) San Francisco: HarperCollins, Press, ISBN 978-0-06-211408-2
- Life Without Lack: Living in the Fullness of Psalm 23 (2018) Nashville: Thomas Nelson ISBN 978-0-7180-9184-2

== See also ==
- American philosophy
- List of American philosophers
- Christian literature
