= Spiritual Formation Bible =

The Spiritual Formation Bible is a study Bible that has an emphasis on Spiritual formation. It may refer to any of these four published titles:

- The Spiritual Formation Bible (NIV)
- The Spiritual Formation Bible: Growing in Intimacy with God Through Scripture (NRSV)
- The Renovaré Spiritual Formation Study Bible (NRSV)
- The Life with God Bible (NRSV)
