= Aldersgate College (Moose Jaw) =

Canadian theological college in Saskatchewan (1940–1995)

- Former name: Moose Jaw Bible School
- Type: Theological college
- Active: 1940–1995
- Religious affiliation: Free Methodist Church in Canada
- Location: Moose Jaw, Saskatchewan, Canada; 50°23′29.8″N 105°32′5.6″W

Aldersgate College of Moose Jaw, Saskatchewan, Canada was originally known as Moose Jaw Bible School and was a Free Methodist Church in Canada theological training college.

With the merger of the Holiness Movement churches of Canada into the Free Methodist Church, the school was renamed Aldersgate College in 1959 with the creation of The Aldersgate College Act. The Moose Jaw Bible School opened in 1940 and closed in 1995.
