= Rollin G. Grams =

American theologian (born 1958)

The Reverend Rollin G. Grams
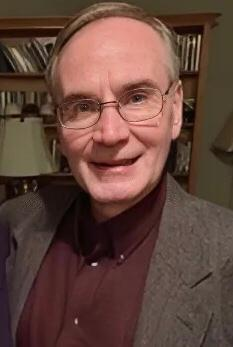
- Born: Rollin Gene Grams; July 25, 1958 (age 68); Welkom, Free State, South Africa
- Occupations: Theologian; author; lecturer
- Spouse: Wendy Davies (m. 1993)
- Children: 3 David Rollin Grams 7/27/1994
- Parents: Eugene Grams (father); Evelyn Phyllis Louton (mother)
- Relatives: Louton family

Academic background
- Education: University of Michigan (B.A.); Gordon-Conwell Theological Seminary (M.T.S); Duke University (PhD)
- Doctoral advisor: James L. Price

Academic work
- Discipline: New Testament scholar
- Sub-discipline: Pauline ethics; Early Christianity; Sexuality in Christianity
- Institutions: Gordon-Conwell Theological Seminary

Rollin Gene Grams (born July 25, 1958) is an American author and theologian. Over his career in theological education, he taught at the Asia Centre for Evangelism and Mission (Singapore), Nairobi Evangelical Graduate School of Theology, Evangelical Theological College (Addis Ababa, Ethiopia), Evangelical Theological Seminary (Osijek, Croatia), TCM International (Heiligenkreuz, Austria), the International Baptist Theological Seminary (Prague, Czech Republic), and Gordon-Conwell Theological Seminary, where he taught for 21 years and concluded his teaching there as the Professor of Biblical Theology and Ethics. c He is currently the Deputy Head for the PhD programme of the Oxford Centre for Religion and Public Life.

== Early life ==
=== Family ===
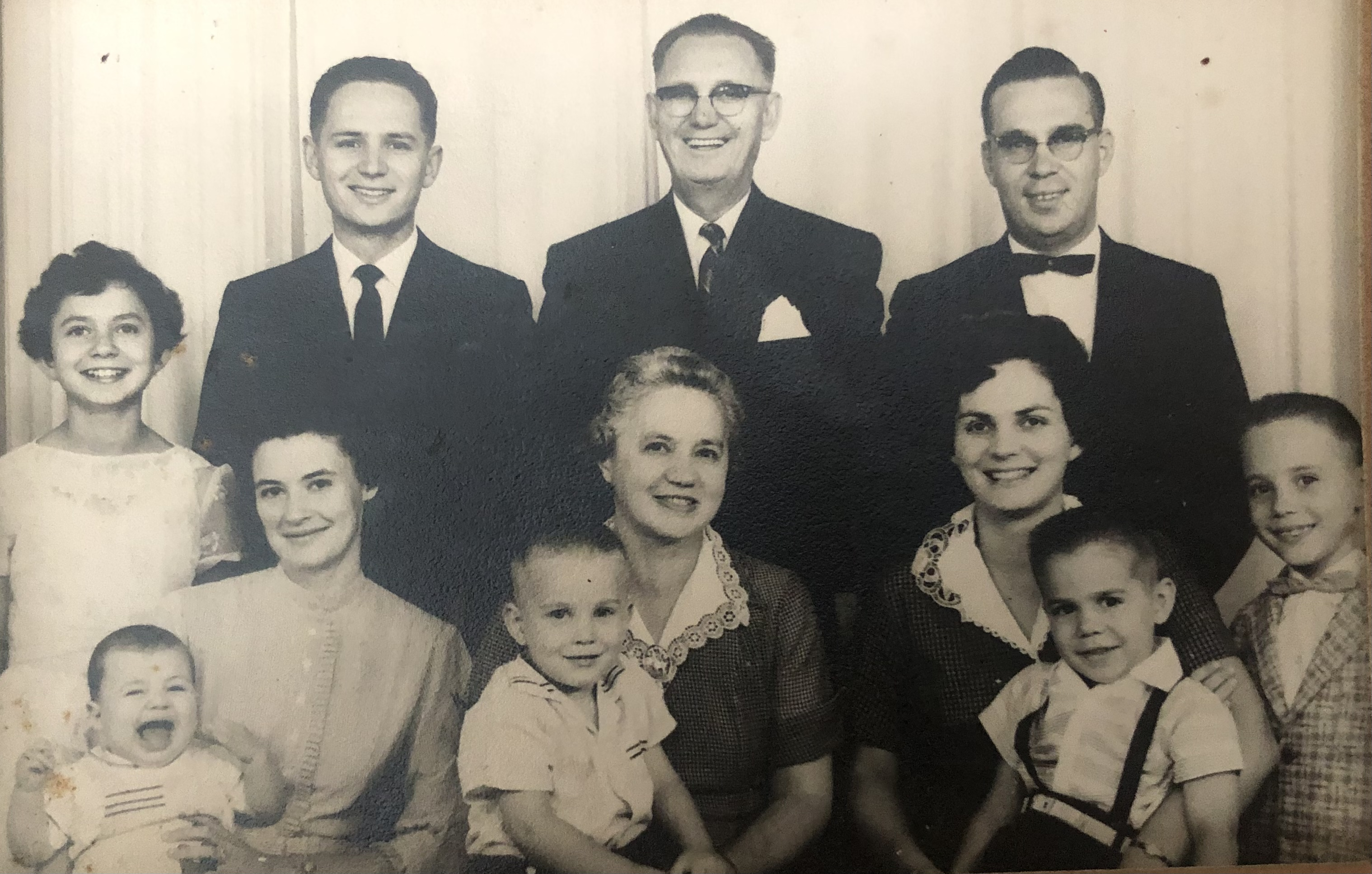
The Louton family in South Africa (c. 1961) Back row L-R: Lois Joy Louton, Edgar Louton, A. G. Louton, Eugene Grams; middle row: Barbara Hughes Louton, Louise Rettinger Louton, Evelyn Phyllis Louton Grams; front row: David A. Louton, Rollin G. Grams, Dennis Grams and Darrell Grams

Grams was born in Welkom in the Free State, South Africa to American missionary parents, Eugene Edgar Grams (1930–2016) and Evelyn Phyllis Grams (née Louton; 1931–2014), a daughter of A. G. Louton and sister of Edgar Louton. Through his mother, he is part of the prominent extended Louton missionary family in South Africa and has contributed scholarly research on his family.

=== Education ===
Grams earned a Bachelor of Arts degree from the University of Michigan in 1978, majoring in psychology and philosophy, where he was awarded the James B. Angell award. He earned a Master of Theological Studies from Gordon-Conwell Theological Seminary in 1980, graduating summa cum laude and joining the Phi Alpha Chi Honor society. He then pursued a Doctor of Philosophy from Duke University in 1989 in New Testament and Christian Origins. His PhD dissertation is entitled Gospel and Mission in Paul's Ethics..

== Career ==
=== Academic work ===
Grams began his career as a theologian in 1985. He taught courses in New Testament studies, ethics, and missions at Gordon-Conwell Theological Seminary in Charlotte, North Carolina from 1992-1997 and again from 2006-2022. He is a supervisor and the Deputy Head of the PhD programme of the Oxford Centre for Religion and Public Life.

His previous teaching roles include positions at the Evangelical Theological Seminary in Osijek, Croatia, where he was a Lecturer and Director of the M.A. in Biblical Studies program from 1997 to 1999. Grams also lectured at the International Baptist Theological Seminary in Prague, Czech Republic (1999–2010), and taught New Testament and Greek at Nairobi Evangelical Graduate School of Theology in Kenya (1989–1991). He has held visiting lecturer positions at theological institutions across Europe, Africa, and Asia.

=== Writing ===
Grams' contribution to Unchanging Witness: The Consistent Christian Teaching on Homosexuality in Scripture and Tradition, co-authored with Professor S. Donald Fortson (B&H Academic, 2016), examines the Biblical and historical evidence for the consistent Christian understanding that homosexuality is a sin. The University of Edinburgh reviewed the book, and it garnered endorsements from notable figures, including the president of Southwestern Baptist Theological Seminary David Dockery, the Anglican Church of Kenya Eliud Wabukala and the Malaysian author and Methodist bishop Hwa Yung.

Grams also authored Stewards of Grace a biography of his prominent missionary parents, published in 2010 by Wipf and Stock. He has also authored Rival Versions of Theological Enquiry (Prague: International Baptist Theological Seminary, 2005) and Towards an Understanding of European Baptist Identity: Listening to the Churches in Armenia, Bulgaria, Central Asia, Moldova, North Caucasus, Omsk and Poland (with assistance from Parush Parushev). Additionally, he has published many articles.

Grams runs the online blog Bible and Mission and served as assistant editor of Transformation Journal from 2002 to 2005.

=== Church and Missions ===
Grams is ordained with the Church of Uganda. He has been a part time missionary educator with United World Missions since 2009. He has also served with SIM. His work has included stints in Kenya, Ethiopia, Malawi, Croatia, the Czech Republic, Germany and the United Kingdom.

== Publications ==
=== As author ===
- Unchanging Witness: The Consistent Christian Teaching on Homosexuality in Scripture and Tradition (co-authored with Don Fortson III), B&H Publishing, 2016. ISBN 978-1-4336-8792-1
- Stewards of Grace: A Reflective, Mission Biography of Eugene and Phyllis Grams in South Africa, 1951-1962, Wipf & Stock, 2010. ISBN 978-1-60899-552-3
- Rival Versions of Theological Enquiry, International Baptist Theological Seminary, 2005

=== As editor ===
- Academic Reasoning, Research and Writing in Religious Studies: A Concise Handbook (co-edited with Parush R. Parushev), Tribun EU, 2008. ISBN 978-80-7399-099-2
- Bible and Mission (co-edited with I. Howard Marshall, Peter Penner, and Robin Routledge), Neufeld Verlag, 2008
- Towards an Understanding of European Baptist Identity (co-edited with Parush R. Parushev), International Baptist Theological Seminary, 2006
