= Northeastern Seminary =

Seminary in Rochester, New York

Northeastern Seminary (NES) is a private Wesleyan seminary on the campus of Roberts Wesleyan University in Rochester, New York. Though it is independent and multi-denominational in its approach to theological education it has strong affiliation with the Free Methodist Church. Degrees offered are the Master of Divinity, Master of Arts, graduate-level certificates, and Doctor of Ministry; all master's degree programs are offered online. Students and graduates represent more than 30 Christian faith traditions.

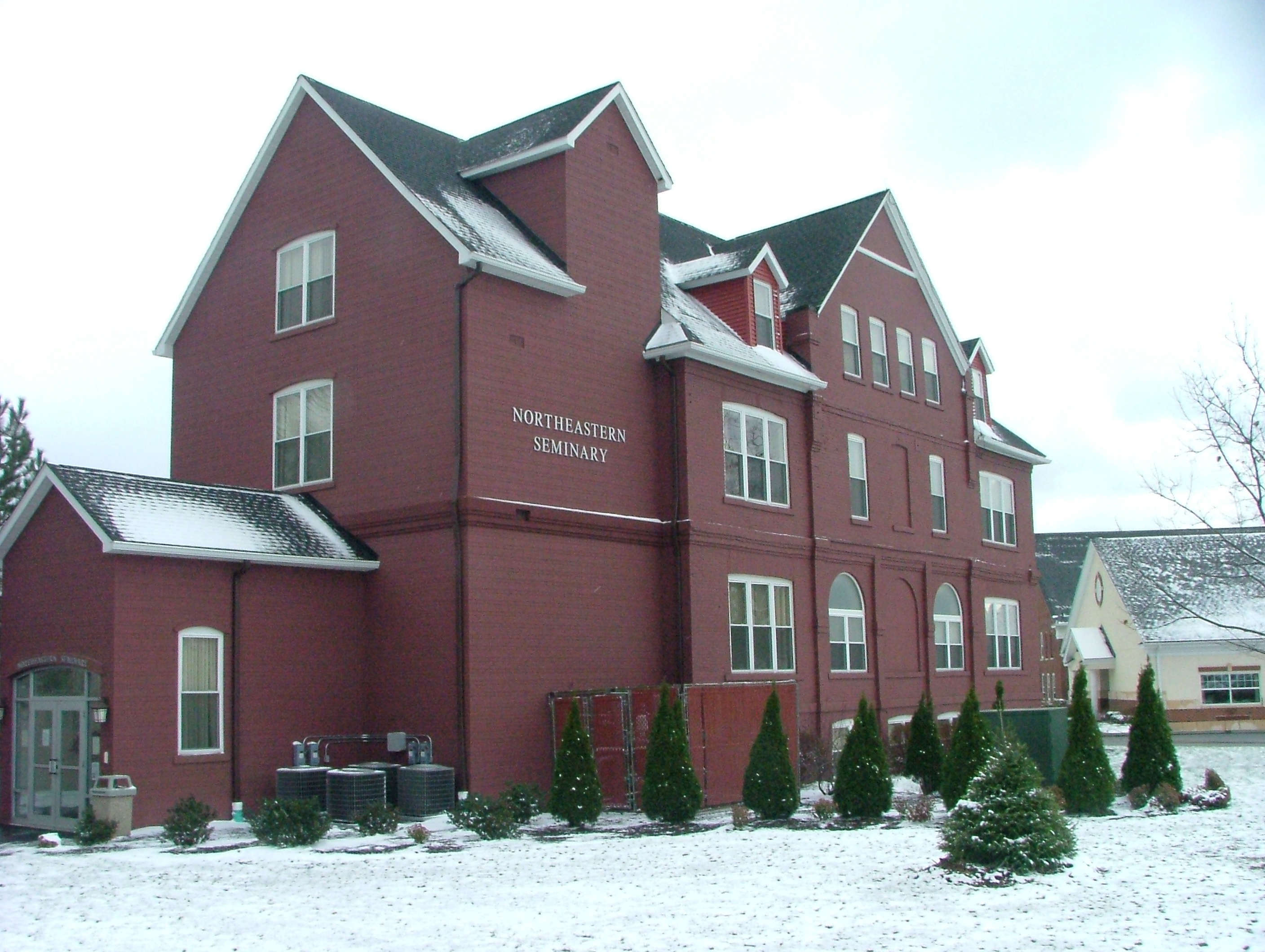
Roberts Hall, located on the campus of Roberts Wesleyan University in Rochester, NY, has been the home of Northeastern Seminary since it was founded in 1998.

Roberts Wesleyan University founded Northeastern Seminary in 1998 as a graduate school of theology. Northeastern Seminary has been accredited by the Association of Theological Schools in the United States and Canada since 2003. It is also accredited by the Middle States Association of Colleges and Schools and the New York State Board of Regents University of the State of New York.

== Master's Programs ==
Master of Divinity (M.Div.) The M.Div. is an 80-credit program serves those preparing to become missional pastors and faithful teachers in ordained ministry. It is also preferred for students seeking to prepare for chaplaincy, missions, and para-church ministries. Students can complete the program online or by attending classes one-night-per-week in the classroom in Rochester, NY. The required courses and field education experience can be completed in as few as three years. Denominational based ordination requirements may be accommodated in the elective credits.

There are four M.Div. concentrations:

- M.Div. in Biblical Interpretation for Preaching and Teaching
- M.Div. in Spiritual Formation
- M.Div. in Theology and Social Justice
- M.Div. in Transformational Leadership

Master of Arts (M.A.)

Master of Arts in Theological Studies The Theological Studies degree is a 44-credit program offering a basic theological education, with a foundation in biblical studies, church history, theology, and personal and spiritual formation. It is the degree preferred by those going on to Ph.D. studies or a teaching professions. A capstone research seminar is required of all those enrolling in this degree program. A thesis option is available with faculty approval.

Master of Arts in Theology and Social Justice The M.A. in Theology and Social Justice is a 44-credit program and equips students to be community advocates working in the areas of local church mission, global justice ministries, social work and social policy. Students studying in the program are exposed to Protestant realism, Catholic social teaching, and liberation theologies and practices. Students have the opportunity to work in the area of social justice in a settings including the parish, para-church and social justice organizations, and community centers for their field experience.

Master of Arts in Transformational Leadership The M.A. in Transformational Leadership is a 44-credit program and is designed to equip Christian leaders for a ministry to the church and the world. In addition to their work in scripture, theology, and spiritual formation, students will learn models and principles for leadership. Best practices in Christian ministry and the business world will be explored, and students will have the opportunity to put their learning into practice in a full year internship experience. A capstone research seminar is required of those enrolling in this degree program.

== Doctor of Ministry Program ==
Scripture, Spirituality and Leadership. The Doctor of Ministry (D.Min.) degree is a 36-credit program designed for seasoned ministry professionals who want to bring renewed vitality and effectiveness to their ministry. It is for leaders who want to expand and refine their knowledge of and facility with God's word and Christian theology through a program that integrates scripture, spirituality, and leadership. The doctoral program is completed online with on-campus residencies and retreat experiences.

- Participation by scholars and practitioners such as Dallas Willard, Will Willimon, Gordon Smith, Ruth Haley Barton, Leith Anderson, and Brian Zahnd.
- Extensive personal and professional assessments,
- The student remains in full-time ministry.
