= Renovation of the Heart =

2002 book by Dallas Willard

- Author: Dallas Willard
- Language: English
- Genre: Christian literature
- Publisher: NavPress
- Publication date: 2002
- Publication place: United States
- Pages: 272
- ISBN: 1-57683-296-1
- OCLC: 49011479
- Dewey Decimal: 248.4 21
- LC Class: BV4511 .W535 2002

Renovation of the Heart: Putting on the Character of Christ is a 2002 Christian book written by Dallas Willard.

== Summary ==
Renovation of the Heart proposes that the human self is made up of several interrelated components: one's spirit, i.e. one's "heart" or "will"; one's mind, or the collection of one's thoughts and feelings; the body; one's social context; and one's soul. Willard argues that one's identity is largely a function of how those components are subordinated to one another, and whether the whole is subordinated to God. Willard argues that popular rejection of subordination to God and the dominance of the body and feelings has resulted in addictions and futile pursuits of stimulation for the body or feelings. Willard argues that the subordinated alignment of one's being can be corrected through apprenticeship to Jesus Christ, which renovates one's heart.

== Reception ==
Renovation of the Heart won the Christianity Today 2003 book award in the category of spirituality.
