= Faculdade de Teologia Metodista Livre =

Private school in São Paulo, Brazil

Free Methodist Theological College
- Faculdade de Teologia Metodista Livre
- Established: 1956
- Religious affiliation: Free Methodist Church
- Website: ftml.com.br

The Faculdade de Teologia Metodista Livre (Free Methodist College), also known as FTML or simply Metodista, is a private school based primarily in São Paulo, Brazil.

== History ==
Metodista traces its history to 1956, when the Methodists created the Free Methodist Church (and the Theology College) in São Paulo.

== Graduation programs ==
The school offers three degree programs at its São Paulo campus:

- Doctorate (Ph.D. / Th.D.)
- Master's degree
- Bachelor's degree (Theology)
