= Methodist College Kuala Lumpur =

College in Brickfields, Kuala Lumpur, Malaysia

Methodist College Kuala Lumpur (MCKL)
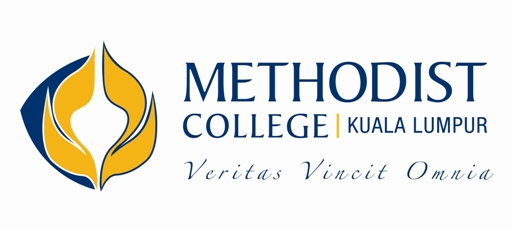
- Motto: Veritas Vincit Omnia ("Truth Conquers All")
- Type: Private
- Established: 1983
- Location: Off Jalan Tun Sambanthan 4, Brickfields, Kuala Lumpur, 50470, Malaysia
- Website: mckl.edu.my

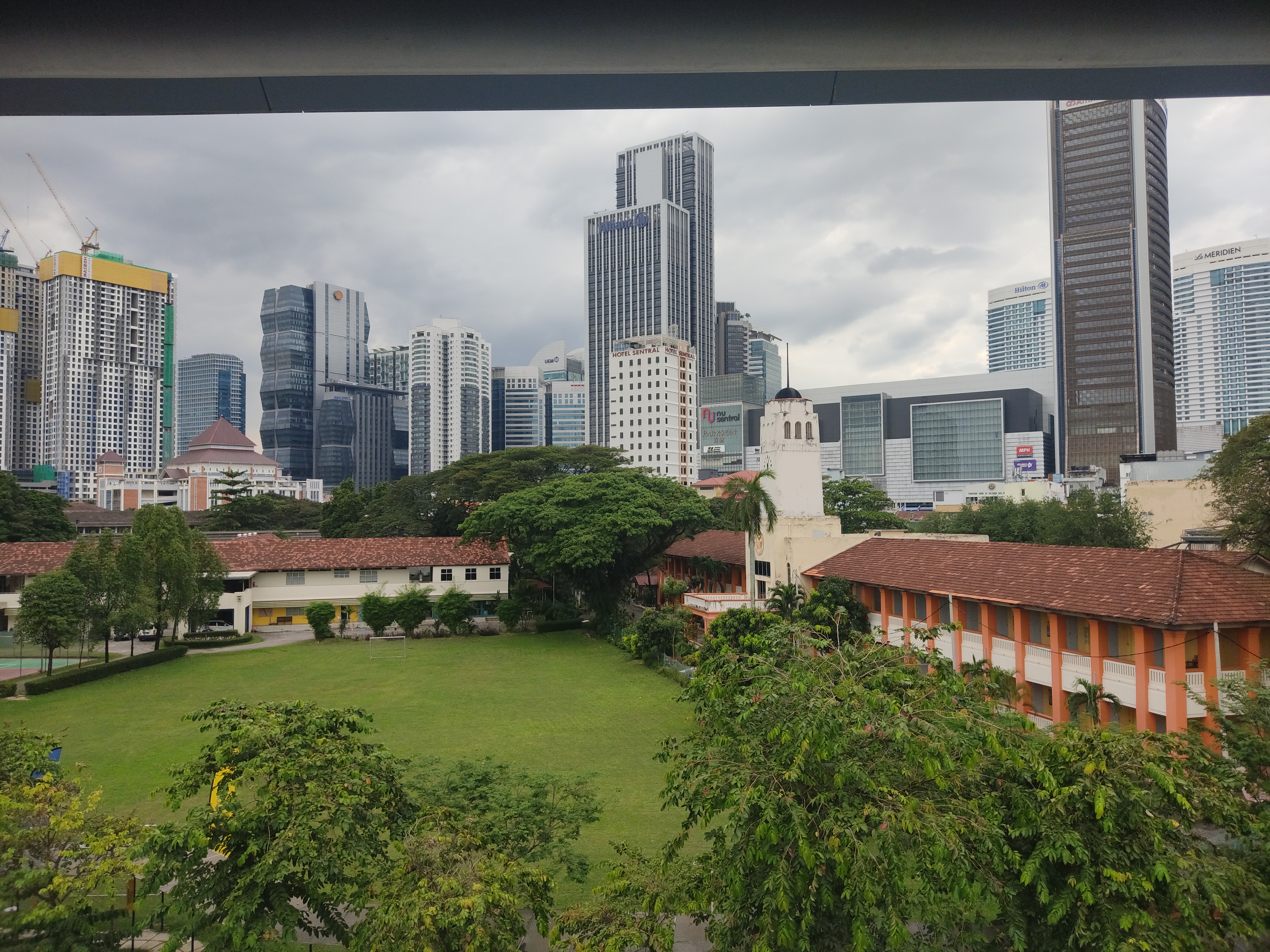
Methodist College Kuala Lumpur

Methodist College Kuala Lumpur is a private college in Malaysia, established in 1983 by the Methodist Council of Education.

== History ==
The school is the successor of Methodist High School, set up as a school of second chance in 1969. The school took in many dropouts who lost their seats in government schools and equipped them for higher education and employment.

As the student population expanded, the school was renamed Methodist College Kuala Lumpur, under the direction of 1983 by principal Mrs F. R. Bhupalan beginning in 1983, the focus shifted to pre-university courses.

It offered Secondary education (form 1 to form 5), form 6, and A-level. In 1994, students of the secondary education were relocated to a new campus in Sentul, currently known as the Wesley Methodist School, to accommodate the increasing number of students. In 1999, Methodist College Kuala Lumpur in Brickfields shifted its focus to A-level, followed by the introduction of AUSMAT, Diploma in Early Childhood Education, CAT and ACCA, and American Degree Transfer Program.

The college building was given a major renovation and expansion in year 2008 with the help from the Methodist Church who financed the launching fund. The college then raised the remaining renovation fund by itself and the new building was completed in year 2010.

== The College ==
The college now provides Cambridge A Level, Australian Matriculation (AUSMAT), Diploma in Early Childhood Education, Certified Accounting Technician (CAT), Diploma in Social Work, Diploma in English Literature, Association of Chartered Certified Accountants (ACCA), and American Degree Transfer Program (ADTP).

MCKL also provides teachers' training through its Cambridge International Certificate & Diploma in Teaching and Learning programmes.

Methodist College Kuala Lumpur (MCKL) has a total student population of 1600, with the biggest group of student pursuing the A Level program.

== Scholarships ==
MCKL is well known for its generous scholarship schemes. It has Merit Scholarship granting scholarships ranging from 15% to 100% of the tuition fee. Scholarships are granted (subject to approval) based on academic results. For instance, students achieving 3 A− in Sijil Pelajaran Malaysia (SPM) or IGCSE would be able to enjoy a 15% Merit Scholarship for the CAT programme. Other scholarships available include Special Scholarships (for Children of Methodist Church Pastors (100%), Children of Pastors from Other Churches (50%), Members of Methodist Churches in Malaysia (15%) High School Leavers from all Methodist Schools in Malaysia, Nobel International School, Sri Sempurna International School, SM Stella Maris, Vision School Tawau, all ICCE qualification, Sibling Scholarship (15%), Financial Aids and Alumni Scholarships.

Alumni Scholarships are exclusive scholarships for MCKL students. Exclusive 100% scholarship for successful applicants into Heriot Watt University, University of Nottingham, INTI International University & Colleges, Help University and many more other scholarships.

== University Partners ==
Methodist College Kuala Lumpur has partnerships with the following Universities:

1. Institute of Technology, Tralee
2. University of Gloucestershire
3. New Zealand Tertiary College

== Affiliations ==
Methodist College Kuala Lumpur has affiliation with the various institutions or bodies:

1. Methodist Church in Malaysia
2. Trinity Annual Conference
3. Tamil Annual Conference
4. Methodist Council of Education Malaysia
5. Malaysia Theological Seminary
6. Wesley Methodist School Kuala Lumpur International
7. Steadfast Association Kuala Lumpur
8. Methodist Boys' School, Kuala Lumpur
9. Sri Sempurna Internal School
10. Wings Melaka
11. Nobel International School
12. Sekolah Menengah Stella Maris
13. Sabah Anglican Academies
14. Yayasan Kajian dan Pembanguanan Masyarakat
15. Malaysia Association of Social Workers
16. MCKL Pykett Campus
17. Wesley Methodist School Penang (International)
