= Hwa Yung =

Malaysian Christian theologian

Hwa Yung (simplified Chinese: 华勇; traditional Chinese: 華勇; pinyin: Huà Yǒng; born 1948) is a Malaysian Christian theologian and church leader.

== Biography ==
Hwa Yung grew up in Penang and studied science at the University of Tasmania, a BD and Master of Theology at the University of London, and a Doctor of Missiology at Asbury Theological Seminary in the United States.

He became a minister in the Methodist Church in Malaysia in 1981, and later a theological college lecturer, serving as principal of the Malaysia Theological Seminary (1986–2001), and founding director of the Centre for the Study of Christianity in Asia at Trinity Theological College, Singapore (2001–2004).

He served as the bishop of the Methodist Church in Malaysia from 2004 to 2012, and is now bishop emeritus. Internationally, he has served as chair of the council of trustees for the Oxford Centre for Mission Studies and was part of the international board of the Lausanne Movement, including its leadership team at the Cape Town 2010 Congress.

== Authentic Asian Christian theology ==
Hwa's most important work was his published doctoral dissertation, entitled Mangoes or Bananas (1997). He describes most Asian evangelical and liberal theologies are more akin to bananas than mangoes, as they may appear to be yellow on the outside but remain white (Western or European) on the inside. This is because much of the Western way of doing theology is informed by rationalistic thinking that divorces Christian practice from idealized Christian thought. He identifies four criteria by which Asian theologies should be assessed: (1) addressing diverse Asian sociopolitical situations, (2) empowering evangelistic and pastoral tasks, (3) facilitating inculturation, and (4) faithfulness to the Christian tradition.
