= Methodist Church in Malaysia =

Religious denomination in Malaysia

- Classification: Protestant
- Orientation: Methodist
- Polity: Connexional
- Leader: Rev. Jeyakumar
- Associations: World Methodist Council, Christian Federation of Malaysia, Council of Churches of Malaysia, Christian Conference of Asia, World Council of Churches
- Region: Malaysia
- Origin: 1976
- Branched from: United Methodist Church
- Congregations: 400 (634 preaching points)
- Members: 114,065
- Ministers: 552
- Missionaries: 54
- Primary schools: 42
- Secondary schools: 32
- Tertiary institutions: 1
- Official website: www.methodistchurch.org.my

The Methodist Church in Malaysia is a body within the Methodist tradition in Malaysia. With approximately 200,000 members in more than 1034 congregations (local and preaching points), it is the second largest Protestant denomination in the country after Sidang Injil Borneo. The current bishop of the Methodist Church in Malaysia is the Rev. Dr. T. Jeyakumar.

The other body of Methodists in Malaysia is the Free Methodist Church in Malaysia, founded in 2002.

== History ==
The church shares part of its heritage with the Methodist Church in Singapore as both the territories shared a similar political history.

The history of the Methodist Church in Malaysia began following a decision taken at the South India Conference held in Hyderabad in 1884, when William Oldham was appointed as a missionary to Singapore in 1885.

The Tamil work started with the coming of a Ceylon Tamil, Mr Underwood. In 1894 the Tamil work was started in Penang by the Pyketts, and in Kuala Lumpur by the Kensetts and was continued by Rev. S Abraham from Ceylon in 1899.

Methodism came to Sarawak in the year 1900 when a group of immigrants came from Fuzhou in mainland China. Missionaries came in 1903 in the persons of J.M Hoover and G.V Summers. Methodism grew rapidly in the town of Sibu and a solid foundation was laid.

The work among the indigenous people, the Ibans, began in 1937 with pioneers like Lucius D. Mamora and Paul H. Schmuker who took the Gospel to the longhouses. The work amongst the Sengoi community in Pahang was started in 1930 with the help of missionaries from Sumatra, Indonesia.

The Methodist Church in Singapore and Malaysia became a self-governing body in 1968. After the separation of Singapore from Malaysia, the Methodist Church in Malaysia became autonomous in 1976.

== Beliefs and practices ==
The Methodist Church in Malaysia declares itself to be part of the holy catholic church and affirms the historic ecumenical creeds, which are used frequently in its liturgy and services of worship.

Additionally, the Methodist Church in Malaysia affirms the Articles of Religion of the Methodist Church as its doctrinal statement and adopts the General Rules of the Methodist Societies as a doctrinal standard.

== Membership ==
The composition church reflects the racial composition of Malaysia. There are 400 churches and 634 preaching points with 552 pastors. The total membership of the Methodist church consists of 114,065 confirmed members, 63,396 preparatory members and 26,482 baptized, above 16 and not confirmed members. There are more than 80,624 weekly worshipers in all the churches.

== Organisation ==
=== Governance ===
There are six conferences under General Conference of The Methodist Church in Malaysia. The annual conferences were traditionally organised along linguistic and ethnic lines but the present day constituent congregations of the various annual conferences tend to be multi-lingual and multi-ethnic:

- Chinese Annual Conference (CAC)

Chinese language congregations in Peninsular Malaysia

- Tamil Annual Conference (TAC)

Tamil language congregations in Peninsular Malaysia

- Trinity Annual Conference (TRAC)

English language congregations in Peninsular Malaysia

- Sengoi Mission Conference (SMC)

Sengoi congregations in Peninsular Malaysia

- Sarawak Chinese Annual Conference (SCAC)

Chinese, English and Malay language congregations in Sarawak

- Sarawak Iban Annual Conference (SIAC)

Iban congregations in Sarawak
(including 1 congregation in Johor Bahru, Johor)

- Sabah Annual Conference (SAC)

Chinese, English and Malay language congregations in Sabah

=== Education ===
Education has been a vital aspect of the work of the Methodist Church in Malaysia from the very beginning. Today, a total of 83 schools and colleges throughout Malaysia are affiliated with the Church. Management and development of these institutions are coordinated by the Methodist Council of Education.

These include 2 institutions of higher learning, the Methodist Pilley Institute in Sibu, Sarawak and the Methodist College Kuala Lumpur in Kuala Lumpur, 6 private schools, and the rest being government aided schools.

== See also ==
- Christianity in Malaysia
- Sabah Methodist Church
- Status of religious freedom in Malaysia
