= Jesus Paesch =

Aruban footballer

Personal information
- Full name: Jesus Paesch
- Date of birth: September 10, 1986 (age 40)
- Place of birth: Oranjestad, Aruba
- Height: 5 ft 9 in (1.75 m)
- Positions: Defender; defensive midfielder

Senior career*
Years	Team	Apps	(Gls)
- SV Racing Club Aruba

International career
2008–2010	Aruba	2	(0)
- * Club domestic league appearances and goals

Jesus Paesch (born 10 September 1986) is a football player and former member of the Aruba national football team. He has two caps for national team.

== Career ==
In 1995, he started playing football for a team in Aruba called Riverplate Aruba. In 2004, he was transferred to SV Racing Club Aruba (RCA). In 2007, he competed with RCA in the Concacaf Champions Cup, which is one of the most important competitions in the Caribbean. In the 2007–2008 season Racing Club Aruba become champions of Aruba. He also has been part of the Aruba national team since he was 15 years old. In 2003, he won a gold medal in the Koninkrik Spelen ("Kingdom Games") with the U-17 Aruba national team. In the summer of 2007 he played in the U-23 Aruba national team which was in connection with the qualification games for the Olympic Games in Beijing 2008. Aruba played against Jamaica, Antigua and Barbuda, and Barbados. Also he was invited to the men's national team, to represent Aruba in different competition and tournaments such as the Digicel Cup and the qualification games for South Africa 2010. With the men's national team he played 2 games. He formerly played football in America in Roberts Wesleyan University and his shirt number was 20.

Paesch now coaches as the head coach for the men's JV soccer team at Roberts Wesleyan University.
