= Everett L. Fullam =

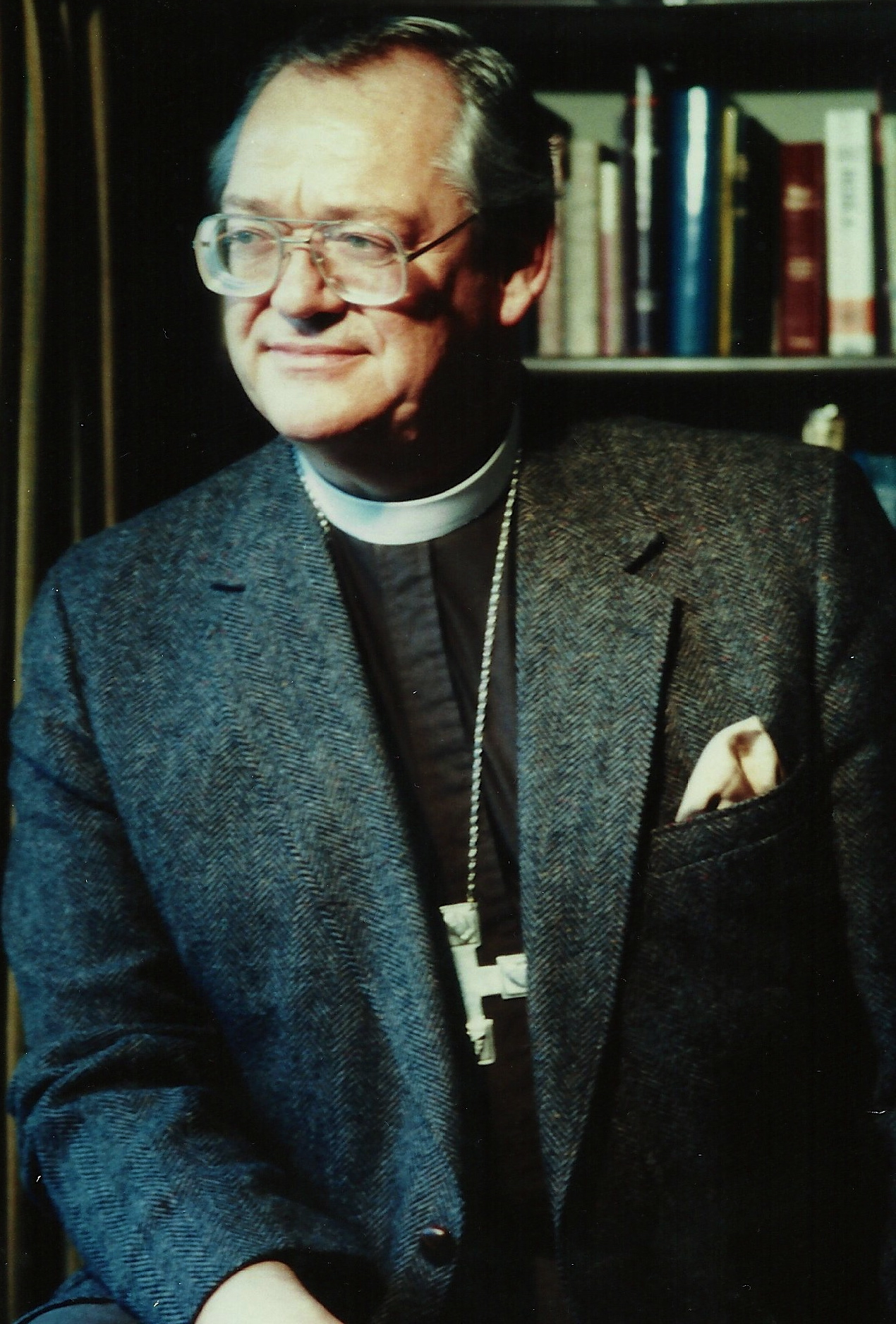
- Fullam, c. 1990
- Born: Everett Leslie Fullam; July 1, 1930; Montpelier, Vermont, United States
- Died: March 15, 2014 (aged 83)
- Occupation: Teaching priest
- Years active: 1967-1998
- Spouse: Ruth (m. 1952 to 2014 [his death])

Everett Leslie "Terry" Fullam (July 1, 1930 – March 15, 2014) was a priest, biblical scholar, and teacher who gained prominence in the Episcopal Church in the United States, and in the Anglican, Roman Catholic, and evangelical communities worldwide for his renewal ministries from 1972 to 1998.

== Early life ==
Fullam was born in Montpelier, Vermont, to Rex Fullam and Mary Fullam (née Mary Frances Tewsksbury). After graduation from high school in Barre, Vermont, in 1948, Fullam began collegiate studies at the Eastman School of Music in Rochester, New York. While there, he was also choirmaster at a nearby Methodist church, whose pastor gave Fullam a copy of James Gilchrist Lawson’s Deeper Experiences of Famous Christians; Fullam later credited the book with helping him to change the direction of his life.

He withdrew from Eastman and matriculated at Gordon College in Wenham, Massachusetts, from which he was graduated magna cum laude, with a baccalaureate in philosophy. He then did graduate work at both Harvard University and Boston University, obtaining his master of arts in philosophy from Harvard, magna cum laude, in 1955.

During the next sixteen years, Fullam held various teaching positions in several universities and colleges. He concluded his academic career as a professor at Barrington College in 1972.

Although Fullam never attended seminary, the Episcopal bishop of Rhode Island ordained him an Episcopal priest in 1967. He was appointed rector of Saint Paul’s Episcopal Church in Darien, Connecticut, in 1972.

In 1984, Fullam received a Doctorate of Divinity from Barrington College. In 1990, Gordon College awarded him the honorary degree of Doctor of Humane Letters.

== Ministry ==
In 1972, Fullam accepted a call to become rector of Saint Paul’s parish in Darien, Connecticut. By way of his leadership, Saint Paul’s became one of the most active and fastest growing churches in the United States. While rector, Fullam placed special emphasis on renewal for clergy and laity alike.

As his reputation as a dynamic renewal leader grew, he received and accepted numerous invitations to teach around the nation and the world.

Bob Slosser’s Miracle in Darien, about Fullam, Saint Paul’s parish, and its ministry, was published in 1980. Reprinted and revised in 1997 (by Bridge-Logos Publishers), the book is recognized today as a leading text on church renewal.

In 1980, too, Fullam’s core teaching was captured in two visually rich presentations produced by L. P. ("Whis") Hays. Jesus, Head of the Church, became the most widely circulated film ever distributed by the Episcopal Radio-TV Foundation. A companion video, entitled What Do You Think of Christ?, was circulated directly by Saint Paul’s and also enjoyed wide viewership. Fullam’s teaching was also captured in audio recordings which remain compelling and are still available online.

In 1989, Fullam resigned his position as rector at Saint Paul’s in order to focus on ministering around the world. He conducted missions in more than 25 countries, including more than 50 travel and teaching missions to Israel and the Middle East. But in 1998, he suffered a stroke and had to discontinue his teaching missions.

== Works ==
Fullam wrote seven published books: Living the Lord’s Prayer (Ballantine Books), Fit for God’s Presence (Chosen Books), Facets of Faith (Episcopal Radio/TV Foundation), Riding the Wind – Your Life in the Holy Spirit (Creation House), How to Walk with God (Thomas Nelson), Thirsting – A Study on the Presence of God (Thomas Nelson), and Your Body God’s Temple (Chosen Books). He also authored an audio teaching library, Life on Wings, containing more than 550 titles.
