= Renovaré =

Christian non-profit organisation

- Formation: 1989
- Founded: 1989
- Founder: Richard Foster
- Location: Denver, CO
- Region served: Worldwide
- Key people: Theodore Harro, President
- Employees: 10
- Volunteers: 50
- Website: https://renovare.org

Renovaré (from Latin: to renew; to restore;) is a Christian non-profit organization engaged in "intentional Christian spiritual formation".

== Overview ==
The organisation is based in Englewood Colorado in the US and draws on the experience of the Christian church across all denominations throughout Christian history. Renovaré's team is ecumenical, composed of members from a wide variety of Christian denominations including Anglican, Baptist, Church of God, Lutheran, Methodist, Roman Catholic, Presbyterian, and Quaker. The ministry is international with affiliates in the USA, Canada, Britain, Ireland.

Renovaré's stated ministry is to lead people toward a balanced vision of faith, and to encourage development of practical strategies for spiritual growth with classical activities such as prayer, Bible reading, worship, meditation and fasting. They state that;

"Renovaré is Christian in commitment, ecumenical in breadth, and international in scope. We seek to resource, fuel, model, and advocate more intentional living among Christians and those wanting a deeper connection with God. We have been a foundational presence in the spiritual formation movement for over 20 years.".

== History ==
Renovaré was founded by Quaker theologian Richard J. Foster in 1988.

After publishing Celebration of Discipline (ISBN 0060628391) in 1978, Foster was invited to a number of churches and conferences to speak on Christian spiritual formation and spiritual disciplines. He was encouraged by people's interest in the subject, but concerned at an apparent lack of substantive teaching in the area (particularly in Evangelical churches in the US). In 1986, he withdrew from public ministry to explore how a more systematic and intentional renewal movement might be formed. This led to the foundation of Renovaré in November 1988. Dallas Willard was one of the early members of the team.

Over the following years, Renovaré held a number of conferences about spiritual formation around the US. In 1994 the ministry relocated its offices from Friends University in Wichita, Kansas (where Foster had been teaching) to Denver, Colorado. International activities started in 2002 with the founding of Renovaré Britain and Ireland; this was followed by the establishment of Renovaré Korea in 2004, and Renovaré Brazil in 2008.

In the summer of 2008, Foster retired as Renovaré’s president (although remaining a member of the Board and Ministry Team). Christopher Webb, an Anglican Franciscan and a member of the Board of Renovaré Britain & Ireland, was appointed as the new president.

In early 2012 the Renovaré Board approved the "restructuring of the leadership" which resulted in the appointment of Rachel Quan as Executive Director. In July 2015 Chris Hall became the new Renovaré president.

== Activities ==
Renovaré publishes print and online resources, including books, articles, messages and podcasts. The organization also run retreats and spiritual formation groups.

The Renovaré Institute for Christian Spiritual Formation runs a two-year online and in-person school.

== International Conferences ==
In addition to conferences around the US, Renovaré has held a series of International Conferences attended by delegates from around the world, including:

- 1991: Lake Avenue Church, Pasadena, CA
- 1999: George Brown Convention Center, Houston, TX with a focus on Dallas Willard's book The Divine Conspiracy ISBN 0060693339
- 2005: Adams Mark Hotel, Denver, CO focusing on the Renovaré Spiritual Formation Bible ISBN 0060671076
- 2009: Municipal Auditorium in San Antonio, TX. The focus of this conference was Eugene Peterson's book The Jesus Way ISBN 080282949X
