= Rupert A. Hayles Jr. =

Academic educator and administrator

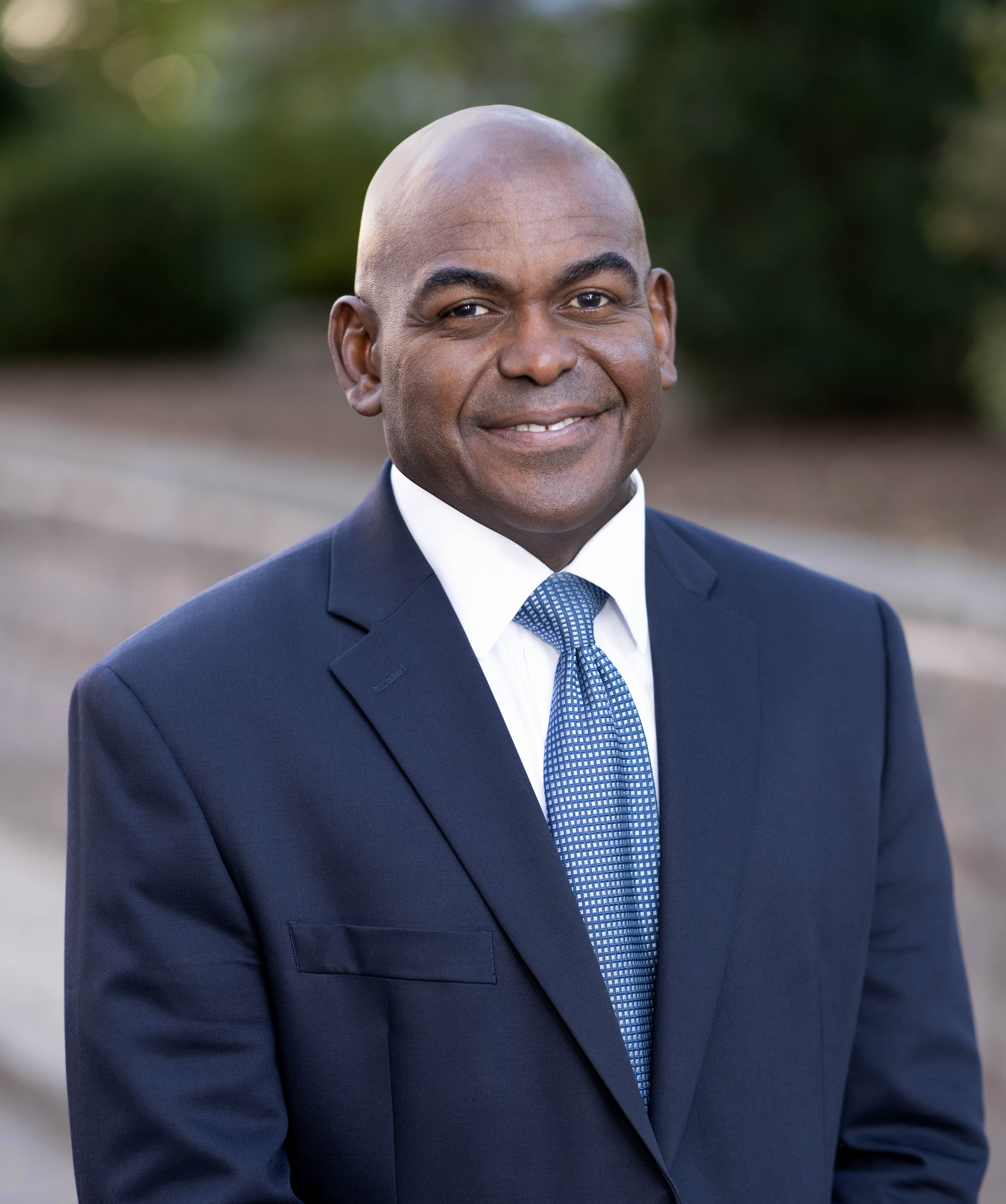
- Incumbent
- Assumed office June 2023
- Preceded by: Deana L. Porterfield

Personal details
- Born: Kingston, Jamaica
- Education: Regent University, Ph.D.
- Website: https://www.roberts.edu/

Rupert A. Hayles Jr. is an academic educator and administrator. He was the 12th president of Roberts Wesleyan University.

== Education ==
He received his bachelor's degree in Information Technology and Accounting, cum laude, from Seton Hall University. Hayles then earned a master's degree in business administration with a concentration in Finance and Decision Sciences from the Wharton Business School at the University of Pennsylvania. He received his Ph.D. from Regent University, specializing in leadership, change management and emotional intelligence.

== Career ==
Hayles became the 12th president of Roberts Wesleyan University. on July 1, 2023. He was inaugurated on September 22, 2023. Dr. Hayles is the former President of Pillar College

Hayles is the former Chief Operating Officer and President of Pillar College from 2019-2023. He is the former Chief Operating Officer of Christ Church in New Jersey from 2001-2016. He was the executive pastor of The Life Christian Church from 2016-2019 in West Orange, New Jersey.

From 1988-2001, he held senior leadership and strategist positions at Prudential Financial, Cytec Industries, now Solvay Chemical, and Merck Pharmaceuticals. From 1985-1990, Hayles served as an airman and later as an officer in the United States Air Force.

== Bibliography ==
As an author, Hayles focuses on emotional intelligence, leadership, spiritual development, and strategy. Hayles is the author of the book, "Practical Strategy: Aligning Business with Information Technology" (Kendal House Publishing, 2005), which presents structures and processes to ensure an organization's technology operations are aligned with their business functions.

He is also the author of "Emotional Intelligence and the Church"(Bridge-Logos, 2012), which focuses on emotional intelligence, social interaction, and scriptural expectations and captures stories of everyday people and their experiences in a church environment. He has written about technology and strategy and has frequently spoken about emotional intelligence and leadership.

== Professional Involvement ==
He is a board member of The Commission on Independent Colleges and Universities in New York and Emotionally Healthy Discipleship, a global organization. He has coached executives in for-profit and for-purpose organizations.

He is a previous lecturer and adjunct professor for the American Management Association and Stillman School of Business, Seton Hall University, and Pillar College.

== Personal life ==
Hayles is married to Maryann L. Hayles, the co-founder and managing partner of The Center for Emotional and Spiritual Development.

He has two children, twins Stephen and Savannah. Hayles and his family live in Rochester, New York.

== Further reading and listening ==
- - Future of Christian Education: An Interview with Alicia Lee, CEO and Founder of Faithly
- - Roberts Wesleyan Names Rupert Hayles Jr. as Its Twelfth President
