= B. T. Roberts =

American Methodist bishop

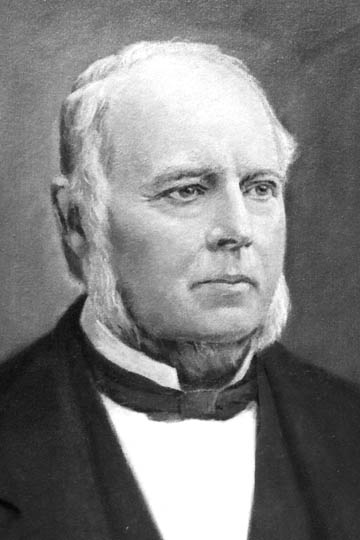

Benjamin Titus Roberts (1823–1893) was an American Methodist bishop. He first trained as an attorney, then entered the ministry in the Genesee Conference of the Methodist Episcopal Church of New York State. His ministerial studies were done at Wesleyan University in Connecticut. He married Ellen Lois Stowe, had seven children, and pastored several churches in New York state.

== Early career ==
During his tenure at Wesleyan University, B. T. Roberts excelled, achieving university honors (Marston, 174). While there, he met Daniel Steele, later to become president of Syracuse University, and William C. Kendall, soon to become Roberts' comrade for reform in the Genesee Conference (Ibid) Upon graduation, Roberts was offered the presidency of Wyoming Seminary of Kingston, PA, a secondary institution of the Methodist Episcopal Church. Roberts declined the position, electing instead to enter the pastorate, seeking elders orders in Genesee Conference of the Methodist Episcopal Church. He was admitted to the Conference in 1848 on trial (Ibid.)

Roberts' first pastoral appointment was Caryville, New York, followed by Pike, New York. Roberts was married during his first charge. At the 1850 annual conference, Roberts was admitted to full membership and ordained a deacon. In 1851, he was sent to the Rushford, New York charge. During these early charges, Roberts demonstrated a concern not only for abolition but also for the destructive effects of wealth upon Methodist livelihood. To Roberts, many of the Methodists in his Genesee Conference, especially those in Conference administration (i.e. bishops and other clergy), were overly concerned with social prestige than with old-time Methodist standards that aim for "growth in holiness," as John Wesley himself said it. Roberts also encountered leaders of what has come to be called the Holiness Movement, individuals like Phoebe Palmer. Roberts was also influenced by Methodist evangelist John Wesley Redfield.

== Conflict with Methodist Episcopal Church ==
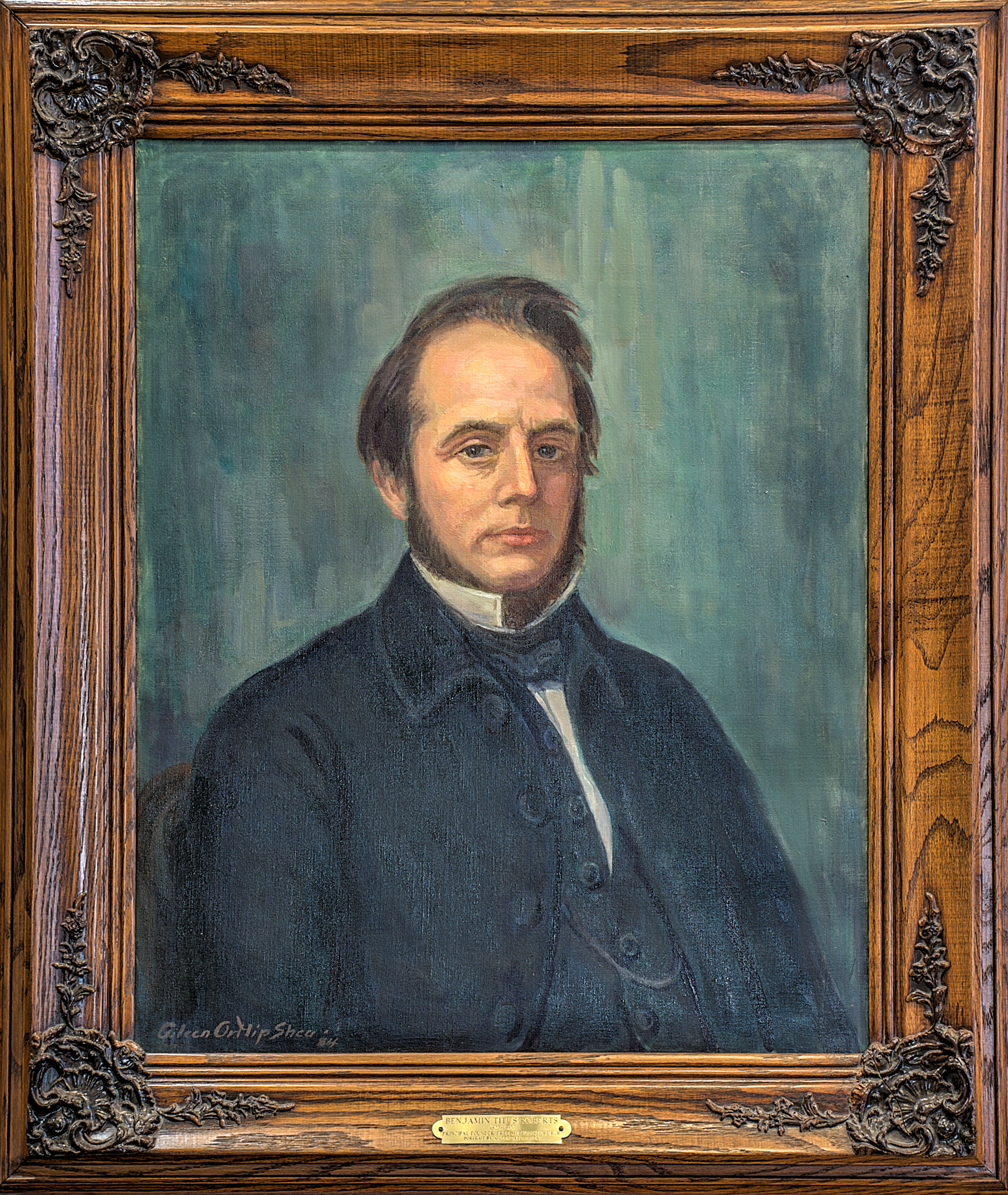
Painting of Roberts on display at the World Methodist Museum, Lake Junaluska, NC

In 1852, Roberts was ordained elder and sent to Niagara Street Church, a central church of the district and oldest church in Buffalo, New York. Roberts' conflict with the conference began in earnest at the Niagara Street appointment for he sought to make the church a "free" church, i.e. eliminate the pew system. Roberts here observed the potential problems of the pew system in which wealthy families could purchase and/or rent pews for congregational worship. Roberts, along with a number of other would-be reformers, could essentially identify three problems with the pew system: 1) it ended the segregation of the worshiping congregation into male and female (which John Wesley himself approved of), 2) it commercialized the church, and 3) it discriminated against the poor. (Marston, 178ff.)

In 1853, Roberts was sent to Brockport, New York. By 1854, it was clear that a major, conference-wide conflict was brewing. On the one side were those conservatives who favored traditional Methodist teaching on matters of social and personal ethics, and who favored the traditional Methodist emphasis on entire sanctification. On the other side were those progressives who favored an assimilation of Methodism to prevailing American sensitivities and mores, including a de-emphasis on entire sanctification in favor of more "realistic" ethical expectations. These conflicting undercurrents bubbled to the surface in 1855. Leslie Ray Marston, former bishop in the Free Methodist Church of North America, best described the situation:

In July 1855 the Buffalo Advocate accused the minority group of organizing a secret society called the "Nazarite Union," basing the charge on a document that had come into the hands of Editor Robie, and which had been prepared by the unpredictable Joseph McCreery, Jr. It is true that McCreery did design an organization to combat the "Buffalo Regency," as the controlling faction came to be called. But McCreery emphatically declared that the so-called "Nazarite Union" existed only on paper, and said "I alone was responsible for the whole concern." Nevertheless, much was made of the affair and the 1855 Conference adopted a resolution which assumed the actual existence of such a union and passed disapprobation thereon. The term "Nazarite Union" came to designate the reform group for several years, but B. T. Roberts never accepted the designation.

The "Buffalo Regency" controlled conference officers and appointments. There has been documented accusation (cf. Marston 183) that the Regency were by and large "secret society men," belonging either to fraternal lodges or meeting in secret outside of Conference meetings in order to bully through policy and resolutions during official Conference meetings. This caused great trouble for Roberts who published the article "New School Methodism" in The Northern Independent, a religious news journal, just days before the 1857 Annual Conference met. In the article, Roberts cited exactly where he believed the Methodist Episcopal Church had deviated from its Wesleyan heritage.

In 1857, the Annual Conference of Genesee convened in LeRoy, NY. Ecclesiastical charges were brought against Roberts. All of his attempts at appeal, trial by committee, or trial in civil court of law were denied. Roberts was convicted of "immoral and unchristian conduct." (Marston, 194) Roberts was not the only Methodist minister to be formally charged by the Genesee Conference in this period, all done so in an avowed effort to stamp out "Naziritism" (i.e. the minority-power reform movement). Though formally reproved, Roberts was appointed to a new charge in Pekin, NY.

While in Pekin, a local preacher named George W. Estes republished Roberts' "New School Methodism" in pamphlet form, including with it documentation of Roberts' trial at the 1857 Annual Conference. (Marston, 197) This was perceived by Conference leadership as a defiance by Roberts of his previous reproof. The Annual Conference met in Perry, NY in 1858 at which time Roberts was once again tried and found guilty. He was formally stripped of his ordination but remained a member of the Methodist Episcopal Church as a layman on probation. During the ensuing year, Roberts supported his family as a traveling preacher as he and the reform movement in general had a healthy following among Methodist laity. This support was demonstrated by a number of local church resolutions within the Genesee Conference, condemning the actions of the Conference leadership in its treatment of Roberts.

The idea of separating from the Methodist Episcopal Church had entered the mind of some reformers and had already produced denominational offspring, both in America and in England. However, Roberts attempted to avoid secession, waiting during his probation period to appeal his case directly to the General Conference of the MEC to be held in 1860. Various "free" Methodist churches, independent of the MEC, were formed prior to Roberts' formation and organization of an official denomination named "Free Methodist."

== Formation of the Free Methodist Church ==
With J. W. Redfield and others, Roberts formed the Free Methodist Church of North America at an organizational conference at Pekin, New York in 1860. That same year he founded a magazine, the Earnest Christian. In 1866 he founded Chili Seminary in North Chili, New York, which today is known as Roberts Wesleyan University in his honor. He was general superintendent of the Free Methodist Church from 1860 to 1893. He traveled extensively and was a frequent speaker at Holiness camp meetings.

Roberts was a staunch abolitionist and early Free Methodists derived their name in part from their opposition to slavery. Many of the early Free Methodists were active in the operation of the Underground Railroad. They were highly critical of the Methodist Episcopal Church, from which many of them had come, because it did not boldly denounce slavery.

Another "freedom" Roberts advocated was the practice of using freewill offerings for church support. They were critical of the Methodist practice of pew rentals, which expressed the social prestige of those who rented the most expensive pews. After the separation of the Free Methodists, the Methodist Episcopal Church abolished pew rentals.

Seventeen years after his death, the Methodists returned his ministerial papers to his son, and formally acknowledged that they had wronged him.

== Bibliography ==
- Howard A. Snyder. Populist Saints: B. T. and Ellen Roberts and the First Free Methodists. (Grand Rapids: Eerdmans, 2006). Howard Snyder's detailed new biography views key nineteenth-century currents and events through the lives of these two extraordinary figures, who taught a "holy populism" of simplicity, justice for the common people, and radical discipleship. Snyder is professor of the history and theology of mission at Asbury Theological Seminary, Wilmore, Kentucky.
- Leslie Ray Marston, From Age to Age, A Living Witness: A Historical Interpretation of Free Methodism's First Century (Indianapolis: Light and Life Communications, 1997).
- Benson Howard Roberts. Benjamin Titus Roberts : a biography by his son (North Chili, New York: "The Earnest Christian" Office, 1900).
- W. T. Hogue, History of the Free Methodist Church, 2 vols. (Winona Lake: Free Methodist Publishing House, 1907)
- Rick McPeak, Earnest Christianity: The Practical Theology of Benjamin Titus Roberts, Doctoral dissertation at St. Louis University, 2001.
- Douglas Cullum, Rhythms of Life, Contours of Faith: Church, Home, and Society Among Early Free Methodists, Doctoral dissertation at Drew University
- Several of B. T. Roberts' writings are available in electronic form free to the public. One can find his Ordination of Women and First Lessons on Money, as well as links to other Roberts' and Free Methodist texts at the official website of the Free Methodist Church of North America. Look under "Resources" at the official site, found at the following HTML address: http://www.freemethodistchurch.org
- One can also find The Life and Works of B. T. Roberts by his son Benson H. Roberts at http://ccel.org/ccel/roberts_bh/holiness.html
