= Richard Foster (theologian) =

American theologian (born 1942)

Richard J. Foster
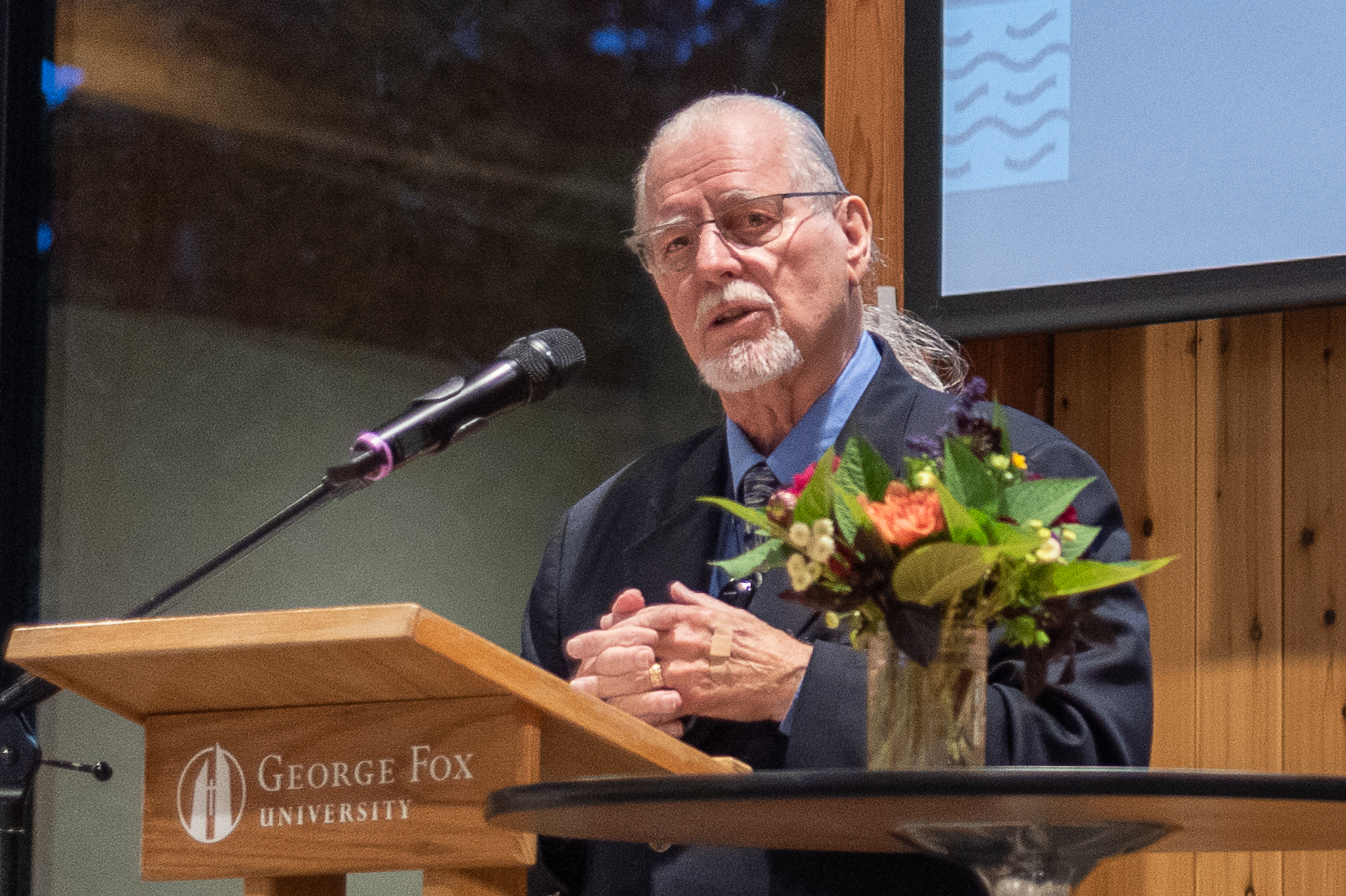
- Foster speaking in 2023
- Born: Richard James Foster; 1942 (age 83–84); New Mexico, United States
- Occupations: Quaker theologian; pastor; author
- Known for: Celebration of Discipline; Renovaré
- Spouse: Carolynn

Academic background
- Education: George Fox University (BA); Fuller Theological Seminary (PThD)
- Thesis: Quaker Concern in Race Relations: Then and Now (1970)
- Theological work
- Tradition or movement: Quaker
- Main interests: Spiritual formation; Asceticism
- Website: renovare.org/people/richard-foster/bio

Richard James Foster (born 1942) is a Christian theologian and author in the Quaker tradition. His writings speak to a broad Christian audience. Born in 1942 in New Mexico, Foster spent the majority of his childhood growing up in Southern California. Foster has been a professor at Friends University and pastor of Evangelical Friends churches. Foster resides in Denver, Colorado. He earned his undergraduate degree at George Fox University in Oregon and his Doctor of Pastoral Theology at Fuller Theological Seminary, and received an honorary doctorate from Houghton College.

Foster is best known for his 1978 book Celebration of Discipline, which examines the inward disciplines of prayer, fasting, meditation, and study in the Christian life, the outward disciplines of simplicity, solitude, submission, and service, and the corporate disciplines of confession, worship, guidance, and celebration. With more than one million copies sold, it was named by Christianity Today as one of the top ten books of the twentieth century. A sequel of sorts is Foster's 1985 Money, Sex & Power (Note: the reverse of poverty, chastity, obedience) and associated study guide.

He also published Freedom of Simplicity in 1981, which further explores the discipline of intentional simple living. Prayer: Finding the Heart's True Home (1992, ISBN 0-06-062846-4), which explores 21 different types of Christian prayer, edited Devotional Classics (1993, ISBN 0-06-066966-7), a devotional guide featuring Christian wisdom through the ages, and Streams of Living Water (2001, ISBN 0-06-062822-7), which examines the place of the different spiritual traditions - Contemplative: The Prayer-Filled Life; Holiness: The Virtuous Life; Charismatic: The Spirit-Empowered Life; Social Justice: The Compassionate Life; Evangelical: The Word-Centered Life; and Incarnational: The Sacramental Life - in Christianity. Sanctuary of the Soul: Journey Into Meditative Prayer

Foster contributed to the devotional Renovaré Spiritual Formation Bible (now published as The Life with God Study Bible). Two editions of this NRSV-based study Bible exist, one with the apocryphal/deuterocanonical texts and one without.

In 2008, he co-authored the book Longing for God with Gayle Beebe.

In 1988, Foster founded Renovaré, a Christian renewal parachurch organization.

In recent years he has allowed his hair to grow, wearing it in a long pony tail. He says this is his way of honoring the portion of his heritage which is Ojibwe.
