= Grant-in-aid =

Central government funding for projects

A grant-in-aid is money allocated from a central/state government to subnational governments to provide specific services or fund specific projects. Such funding is usually used when the government and the legislature decide that the recipient should be publicly funded but operate with reasonable independence from the state. Policymakers often manipulate grants-in-aid to direct funding to politically important places.

In the United Kingdom, most bodies in receipt of grants-in-aid are non-departmental public bodies.

A grant-in-aid has funds allocated by one level of government to another level of government that are to be used for specific purposes. Such funds are usually accompanied by requirements and standards set by the governing body for how they are to be spent. An example of this would be how the US Congress has required states to raise the drinking age for alcohol from 18 to 21 for the individual states to continue to qualify for federal funds for interstate highways within each state.

== See also ==
- Athletic scholarship
