= Spiritual formation =

Process of spiritual personal development

Spiritual formation may refer either to the process and practices by which a person may progress in one's spiritual or religious life or to a movement in Protestant Christianity that emphasizes these processes and practices. The processes may include, but are not limited to,

- Specific techniques of prayer and meditation
- A lifestyle integrating spiritual disciplines or exercises
- Understanding and practice of historical religious philosophy and techniques
- The knowledge and expression of the truth of God and of self

There are numerous definitions of spiritual formation and no definitive depiction due to the breadth of the concept and the numerous perspectives from which religious persons may approach it. From a Christian standpoint, some state that it is identical with sanctification as understood as a progressive and gradual process of maturation. It is often referred to as "being conformed to the image of Christ," being made holy, or the formation of virtue and character. In Care of Mind, Care of Spirit, psychiatrist Gerald G. May offers, “Spiritual formation is a rather general term referring to all attempts, means, instruction, and disciplines intended towards deepening of faith and furtherance of spiritual growth. It includes educational endeavors as well as the more intimate and in-depth process of joy and enthusiasm spiritual direction.”

== Christianity ==
Christian spiritual formation is distinct from other religious perspectives due to the centrality of Jesus as the model of the process and ultimate goal of formation as well as the activity of the Holy Spirit in the believer to develop them toward maturity. Additionally, in the contemporary Christian tradition, many have emphasized the growth of multiple aspects of the human person, distinguishing between faculties such as the intellectual, emotional, and spiritual, all of which must be developed in tandem for the maturity of the whole person.

=== Disciplines ===
Because the popular understanding of Protestant spiritual formation in the current era arose around a discussion of spiritual disciplines, as noted below, those disciplines have played a significant role in its conceptualization and practice. Such disciplines may be understood as means of exercising and strengthening one's religious and spiritual capacities, a means of accessing a spiritual reality directly, or a manner of making oneself available to the activity of God.

Quaker theologian Richard Foster in his book, Celebration of Discipline, includes several internal, external, and corporate disciplines one should engage in through his or her Christian life. These include the following:

- internal disciplines:
  - meditation
  - prayer
  - fasting
  - study
- external disciplines:
  - simplicity
  - solitude
  - submission
  - service
- corporate disciplines, completed within the body of the church:
  - confession
  - worship
  - guidance
  - celebration

Related specifically to the practices of solitude, stillness and silence, Dallas Willard stated that practices "that look more 'Catholic,' like solitude, silence, and so on, we're not so good with those. And usually I find they deal with the areas where our deepest problem lies. So we have to find the ways of taking our body into solitude and silence, into service, as well as into worship, into prayer, as well as into study."

== History of the Protestant Movement ==
The history of spiritual formation as a specific movement within 20th century Protestantism is possible. James Houston traces the history of the movement to post-Vatican II reformers within the Roman Catholic church, who sought to find ways to educate and train new priests in a manner that was appropriate to Vatican II ideals. This formative perspective began to spread into and was adopted by the Association of Theological Schools, and as an increasing number of evangelical schools began joining them in the 1970s and 1980s, the ideals spread throughout the academic and theological strata of Christianity, particularly in the United States. While initially aimed at academic and pastoral leadership, Houston notes that the Protestant ideal of the priesthood of all believers pushed churches to expand this formative ideal to all individuals.

On a popular level, the formation movement emerged, in part, with the publication of Richard Foster's Celebration of Discipline in 1978, which introduced and popularized a set of spiritual disciplines as historical practices beyond Bible study, prayer, and church attendance that may lead to religious maturity and spiritual growth.

== Controversy ==
=== Short-Term Movement ===
Because spiritual formation has been used, in recent decades, to describe a loose but semi-coherent set of practices and ideals within American Protestantism, many have accused it of merely being a "fad". Such persons dismiss it because of this trendiness, but others have argued that to relegate it only to a small sub-group within the church is to neglect its necessity to Christian practice.
