= James Gilchrist Lawson =

American Baptist evangelist, prohibitionist, editor, and author

James Gilchrist Lawson (1874–1946) was an American Baptist evangelist, prohibitionist, editor, author and compiler. He was born in Cleveland, Tennessee on September 10, 1874 to James J. and Margaret (Logan) Lawson. He visited the British Isles in 1900 and spent the next eight years there, five of those years as special correspondent for religious papers of London.

He married Camilla Martens on November 14, 1914, in Illinois. From 1909–1922 he was manager of Glad Tidings Publishing Company (Chicago, Illinois); editor at Church Publishing House, publisher of church magazines, from 1925–1932; manager of Family Altar League for seven years and an editor for Family Altar Magazine.

Most notably, he wrote and compiled biographical sketches for Deeper Experiences of Famous Christians (1911), which is a landmark text in Pentecostal and Charismatic history. This book draws broadly from Christian history and the Wesleyan holiness movement to include many post-conversion experiences with the Holy Spirit, which Lawson believed to be the baptism of the Holy Spirit. In this way, it connects the modern Pentecostal movement, which began in 1900, to the much larger stream of Christian theology and history.

Biographical sketches include Girolamo Savonarola, Fénelon, Madame Guyon, John Wesley, Charles Finney, William Booth, and many others.

Lawson was editor of The Marked Reference Bible, which was an expansion on The Christian Worker's New Testament which he had published in 1924. The Marked Reference Bible includes a chain-reference and a color-coding system. The four colors represent the primary topics of salvation (red), the Holy Spirit (green), temporal blessings (brown), and prophetic subjects (blue).

Lawson's compilations include Greatest Thoughts About the Bible, Greatest Thoughts About Jesus Christ, Greatest Thoughts About God, The World's Best Humorous Anecdotes (1923), The World's Best Conundrums and Riddles of all Ages (1924), The World's Best Epigrams (1924), and The Best Loved Religious Poems. In 1941, Lawson published a compilation of biographical sketches called Famous Missionaries.

Lawson said of himself in the introduction to Greatest Thoughts About God, "For the greater part of his life the compiler of this volume has been collecting the greatest thoughts of the greatest thinkers on the greatest themes. During the years the compiler has engaged in evangelistic work in the United States and Great Britain, he was able to consult the best books in the best libraries of America and Britain and to glean the best thoughts from them. While engaged in journalistic work, for five years, for the leading religious papers, in London, England, he was brought in contact with most of the religious leaders of the world and garnered the best thoughts from them. Through his connection with the religious publishing business during the last ten years, he has been able to collect the best thoughts from all the leading religious papers. Owing to the exceptional privileges which have been given to him by the providence of God, the compiler of this volume is able to give to the world the very cream of religious thoughts concerning God."
