= Pekin, New York =

Hamlet in New York, United States

Coordinates: 43°10′06″N 78°53′06″W

Pekin is a hamlet in the towns of Cambria and Lewiston in Niagara County, New York, United States. It was a stop in the Underground Railroad.

It is the birthplace of the Free Methodist Church. USA.
