= Roberts Wesleyan University =

Methodist university in Chili, New York, US

Coordinates: 43.125743°N 77.798530°W

- Former names: Chili Seminary (1866–1885); A.M. Chesbrough Seminary (1885–1945); Roberts Junior College (1945–1949); Roberts Wesleyan College (1949–2022)
- Motto: Education for Character
- Type: Private university
- Established: 1866; 160 years ago
- Religious affiliation: Free Methodist Church
- Academic affiliations: CIC; NAICU; CCCU
- Endowment: $39 million (2025)
- President: Rupert A. Hayles Jr.
- Academic staff: 89 FT/ 10 PT
- Undergraduates: 1,092 (2023)
- Postgraduates: 527 (2023)
- Location: North Chili, New York, United States
- Campus: Suburban
- Colors: Red and black
- Nickname: Redhawks
- Sporting affiliations: NCAA Division II – ECC
- Mascot: Reggie the Redhawk
- Website: roberts.edu

Roberts Wesleyan University is a private Christian university in Chili, New York, near Rochester, New York, United States. It was the first educational institution established for Free Methodists in North America. Roberts is accredited by the Middle States Commission on Higher Education. In the fall of 2023, Roberts Wesleyan enrolled 1621 students in undergraduate, graduate, adult degree completion and doctoral programs.

== History ==
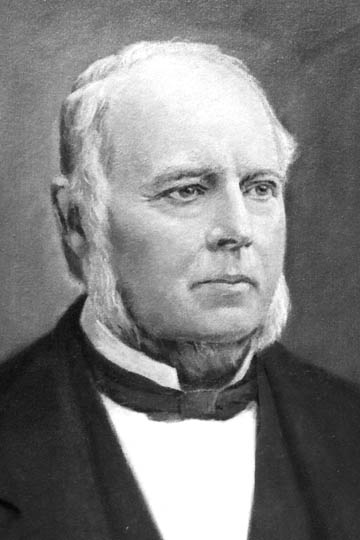
Benjamin Roberts, founder

Roberts Wesleyan University was originally established as "Chili Seminary" by Benjamin Titus Roberts in 1866. Roberts was an American Methodist bishop, a social activist who opposed slavery and oppression of the poor, and was a supporter of women's right to vote. He began the school to train young people to become servant leaders with high moral character. Having first used a local tavern as a school, in 1869 a three-story brick building was erected. There were 56 students total that year.

In 1885, its name changed to "Chesbrough Seminary" in response to the $30,000 gift of benefactor A.M. Chesbrough.

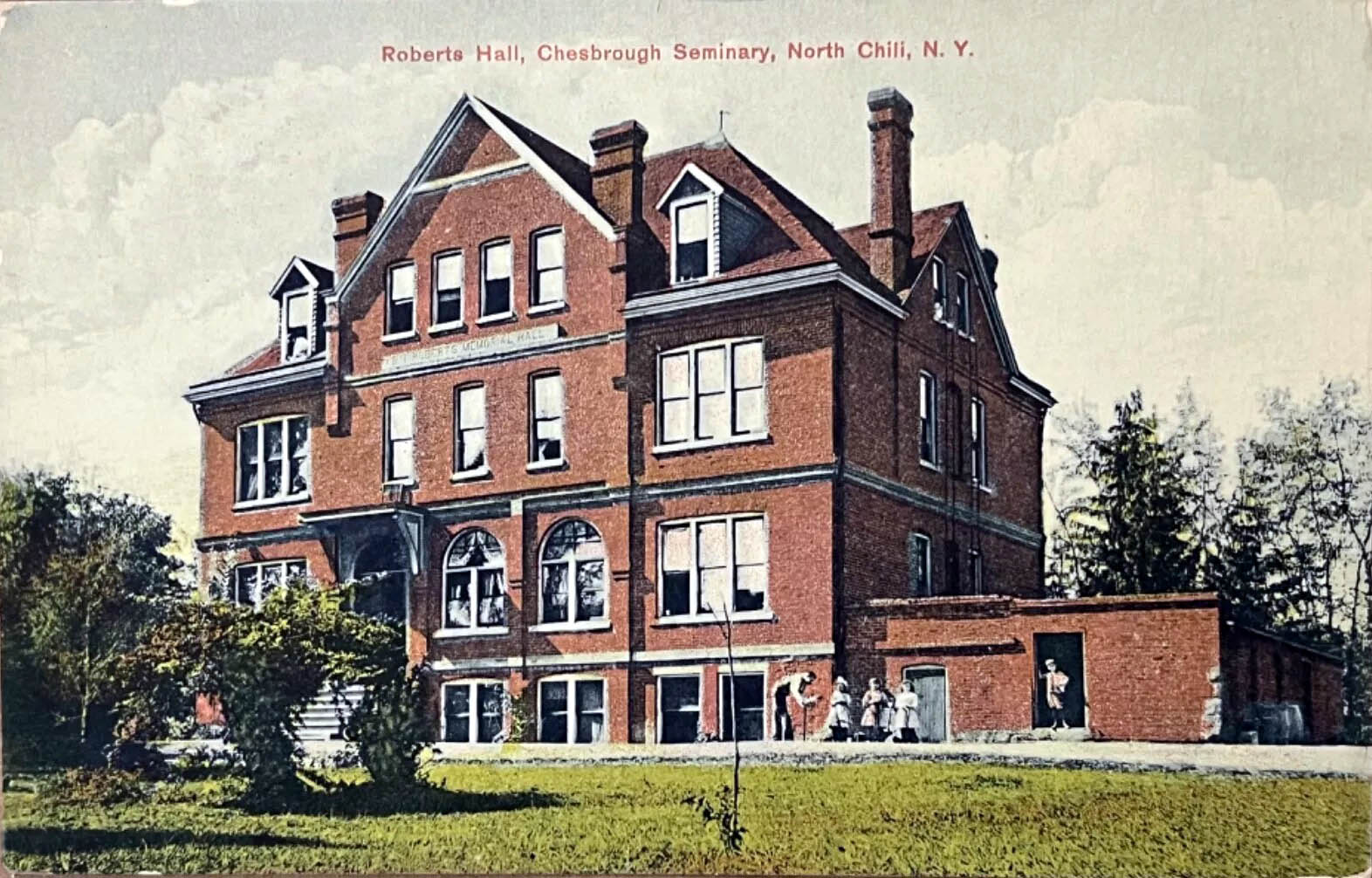
Chesbrough Seminary c. 1910

In the fall of 1892 both Cox Hall and Roberts Hall were completed. Cox Hall was used as both class rooms and administration, and now houses the Department of Music and Performing Arts. The first public event held in Cox Hall was founder B.T. Roberts' funeral in 1893. Students laid a sidewalk between Cox and Roberts Hall in 1929.

Carpenter Hall was opened in 1935. It was named for Adella P. Carpenter who had taught at the school from 1877 to 1916. Carpenter Hall has housed many important pieces of the campus, including the dining hall, library, and dorms. The building currently houses the Art, Social Work, and Psychology Departments.

In 1945, it was renamed "Roberts Junior College" in honor of B.T. Roberts, the founder of both the college and the Free Methodist Church. Four years later, it was renamed as "Roberts Wesleyan College" to indicate the transition to a four-year baccalaureate institution and to root itself clearly within the Wesleyan theological tradition.

In 1998, Northeastern Seminary was established as Roberts' graduate school of theology.

On September 13, 2022, it was renamed "Roberts Wesleyan University" after applying to the New York State Education Department and the Board of Regents.

The 12th president of Roberts Wesleyan University is Rupert A. Hayles Jr., who started on July 1, 2023, and left the institution in late 2025. His replacement, Dr. Nicholas Willis, was announced in May 2026.

== Athletics ==
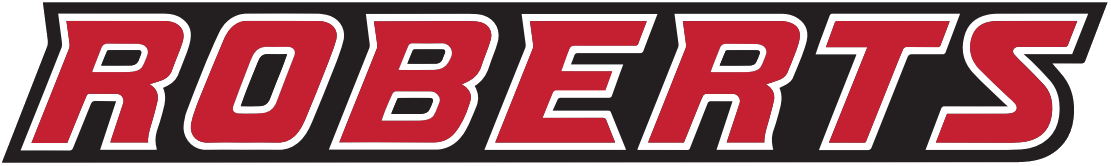
Roberts Redhawks wordmark

The Roberts Wesleyan athletic teams are called the Redhawks. Roberts is a member of the NCAA Division II ranks, primarily competing in the East Coast Conference (ECC) since the 2012–13 academic year. They are also a member of the National Christian College Athletic Association (NCCAA), primarily competing as an independent in the Midwest Region at the Division I level. The Redhawks previously competed in the defunct American Mideast Conference of the National Association of Intercollegiate Athletics (NAIA) from 2001–02 to 2011–12 (when the conference dissolved).

Roberts Wesleyan competes in 19 intercollegiate varsity sports. Men's sports include basketball, cross country, lacrosse, soccer, swimming & diving, volleyball and track & field (indoor and outdoor); women's sports include basketball, bowling, cross country, lacrosse, soccer, swimming & diving, track & field (indoor and outdoor) and volleyball. Four sports were added in 2023–24: women's field hockey and triathlon, men's volleyball, and the coeducational and non-NCAA esports. The Women's Flag Football program will begin competition in Spring 2026.

In July 2011, Roberts was accepted into the NCAA Division II reclassification process from the NAIA to the NCAA. Roberts became a full member of NCAA Division II for the 2014–15 academic year. Roberts Wesleyan University is the first NCAA Division II school in the Greater Rochester Region.

== Notable alumni ==
- Kirk Wagar (1990), United States Ambassador to the Republic of Singapore
- John Walsh (1990), President of the Conservative Party of Canada
- Jennifer Suhr (2004), Pole Vaulter, 2012 Olympic Gold Medalist, 2008 Olympic Silver Medalist, 2013 Women's Pole Vault Champion – USA Outdoor Track and Field Championships, holder of the indoor women's pole vault world record, American women's pole vault record, holder of 15 National Titles.
- Timothy Bellavia (1992), children's author / illustrator and professor, Touro College
- Richard Goddard, Goalkeeper, Vancouver Whitecaps
- Juan Pablo Galavis (2001), Former professional soccer player and contestant on The Bachelor
- Sharon Sweet (1974), Opera Singer, Metropolitan Opera Company & Vocal Professor, Westminster Choir College.
- Daniel Bennett (2002), Award-winning Manhattan-based jazz bandleader and composer
- Jesus Paesch (2012), Former professional soccer player
- Brian Kolb (1996 BS, 1998 MS), Former Minority Leader of the New York State Assembly
- Malcolm Shaw (soccer) (2017), Canadian professional soccer player, forward
- Michael Cunningham (soccer) (2014), English professional soccer player, forward
