= Free Methodist Church =

Christian denomination

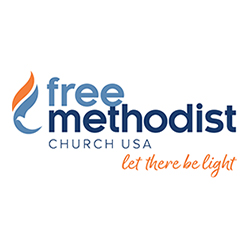
- Emblem of the Free Methodist Church USA
- Classification: Protestant
- Orientation: Holiness
- Polity: Modified episcopacy
- Associations: Global Wesleyan Alliance; Christian Holiness Partnership; Christian Churches Together; Wesleyan Holiness Consortium; World Methodist Council; National Association of Evangelicals
- Region: Worldwide: divided into 13 General Conferences
- Founder: Benjamin Titus Roberts
- Origin: 1860; Pekin, New York
- Separated from: Methodist Episcopal Church
- Separations: 1881 - Vanguard Mission; 1882 - Pentecost Bands; 1932 - Reformed Free Methodist Church; 1955 - United Holiness Church (now the Bible Methodist Connection of Churches); 1963 - Evangelical Wesleyan Church; 1973 - Fellowship of Independent Methodist Churches
- Congregations: 856 in the United States (average congregation size: 77)
- Members: 1,200,797 (68,356 in the United States)
- Official website: fmcusa.org

The cross and flame logo of the Free Methodist Church, created in 1985

The Free Methodist Church (FMC) is a Methodist Christian denomination within the holiness movement, based in the United States. It is evangelical in nature and is Wesleyan–Arminian in theology.

The Free Methodist Church has members in over 100 countries, with 62,516 members in the United States and 1,547,820 members worldwide. The Light & Life Magazine is their official publication. The Free Methodist Church World Ministries Center is in Indianapolis, Indiana.

== History ==
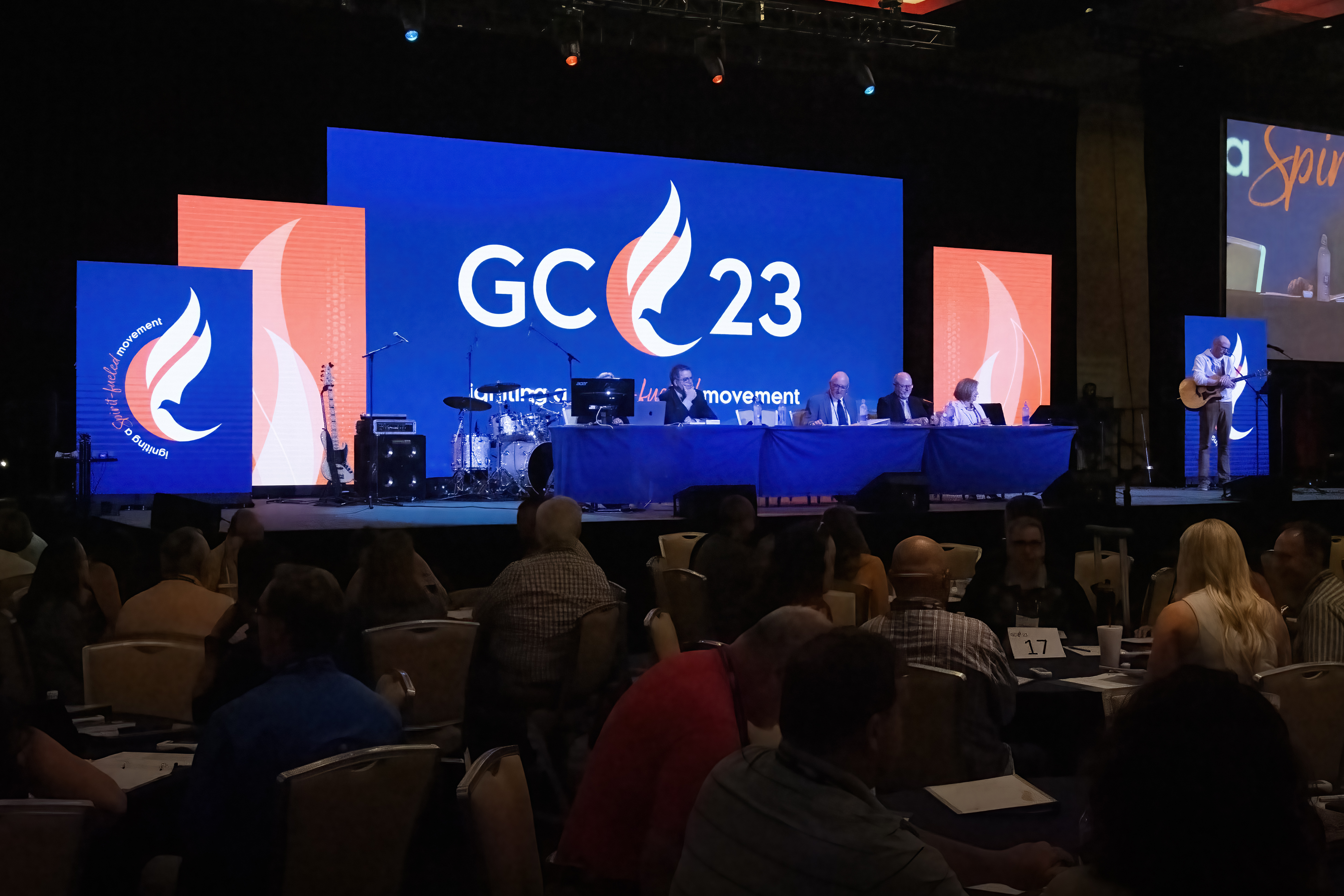
Free Methodist Church USA General Conference 2023

The Free Methodist Church was organized at Pekin, New York, in 1860. The founders had been members of the Methodist Episcopal Church but were excluded from its membership for earnestly advocating what they saw as the doctrines and usages of authentic Wesleyan Methodism. Under the leadership of the Rev. Benjamin Titus (B. T.) Roberts, a graduate of Wesleyan University, the movement spread rapidly. Societies were organized, churches built, and the work established.

Before the founding of the church, Roberts began publication of a monthly journal, The Earnest Christian. In 1868, The Free Methodist (now Light & Life) was begun. A publishing house was established in 1886 to produce books, periodicals, and Sunday school curriculum and literature.

The name "Methodist" was retained for the newly organized church because the founders believed that they were continuing the authentic practice of the doctrines and standards of Methodism; to them, their expulsion from the Methodist Episcopal Church happened because of their adherence to the same. The word "Free" was suggested and adopted because the new church (1) was anti-slavery; (2) wanted pews to be free to all regardless of status, rather than sold or rented (as was common); (3) promoted freedom of worship in the Holy Spirit, as opposed to stifling formality; (4) upheld the principle of "freedom" from secret and oath-bound societies (in particular the Masonic Lodge), so as to have full loyalty to Christ; (5) stood for "freedom" from the abuse of ecclesiastical authority (due to the bishop's action in allowing expulsion of 120 clergy and lay); and (6) desired its members to experience entire sanctification via the Holy Spirit through consecration and faith.

At the 1910 session of the General Conference of the Methodist Church at Rochester, New York, a full acknowledgement was made of the wrong done to the late Roberts fifty years before, and the credentials taken from him were restored in a public meeting on his behalf to his son, Rev. Benson Roberts.

Holiness Conservatives within the Free Methodist Church left to form the Reformed Free Methodist Church in 1932, the United Holiness Church in 1966 (which joined the Bible Methodist Connection of Churches in 1994) and the Evangelical Wesleyan Church in 1963.

Free Methodist headquarters were located in Winona Lake, Indiana until 1990, when the denomination moved to Indianapolis, Indiana.

The Free Methodist Church released a 21st Century articulation of its Historic Freedoms to include the following:

1. Freedom of all races to worship together in unity.
2. Freedom for the poor to be treated with dignity in the church and with justice in the world.
3. Freedom for women and men to be treated respectfully and use their gifts equally in the church, in the home, and in the world.
4. Freedom for laity to be fairly represented in the governing bodies of the church.
5. Freedom from spiritual, political, social or conceptual alliances that compromise or subvert the exclusive allegiance we profess to Jesus Christ.
6. Freedom to engage in worship that is moved and inspired by the Holy Spirit.
7. Freedom from sin's power through full surrender to God.

== Statistics ==
The church has about 62,516 members in the United States as of 2021. Worldwide its membership is over 1,500,000. with large segments of membership in East Central Africa (Rwanda, Burundi, DRC) and other countries.

== Beliefs and practices ==
In doctrine, Free Methodists’ beliefs are the standard beliefs of Wesleyan-Arminian Protestantism, with distinctive emphasis on the teaching of entire sanctification as held by John Wesley, to whom the Free Methodist Church traces its origins.

The Free Methodist Church, along with the United Methodist Church, shares a common heritage linked to the Methodist revival in England during the 18th century. The Free Methodist Church itself arose within the context of the holiness movement within 19th century Methodism.

The first general superintendent, B. T. Roberts, was in favor of ordaining women, but never saw it take place in his lifetime. Out of his own conviction he wrote Ordaining Women: Biblical and Historical Insights. The impact of his writings eventually prevailed in the church. The Free Methodist Church allowed women to be ordained as deacons in 1911, but full ordination into the office of elder did not occur until 1974. As of June 2008, women represented 11% of ordained clergy (216 of 2,011) and 26% of candidates for the ministry.

Free Methodists recognize and license unordained persons for particular ministries. They mandate lay representation in numbers equal to clergy in the councils of the church.

As a reaction to paid musicians in the Methodist Episcopal Church, early Free Methodists enjoyed a capella congregational hymns during worship. However, the General Conference of 1943 voted to allow each Conference to vote on whether or not their churches could have instrumental music. As a result, pianos and organs became common across most conferences. Currently, many churches have worship teams composed of vocalists, drums, keyboards, guitars, and other instruments.

== Organization ==
The Free Methodist Church's highest governing body is the World Conference, which is composed of representatives, both lay and clergy, from all countries with a Free Methodist General Conference. As the church in each country develops, its status progresses from Mission District to Annual Conference to General Conference. There are currently 20 General Conferences in the world, which are linked together through the articles of religion and common constitution of the first two chapters of the Book of Discipline, the World Conference, and the Council of Bishops. The USA branch of the Free Methodist Church is currently led by three bishops: Bishop Keith Cowart, Bishop Kaye Kolde, and Bishop Kenny Martin. Bishop Cowart was first elected in 2019 and re-elected in 2023. Bishops Kolde and Martin were first elected in 2023.

== World Missions ==
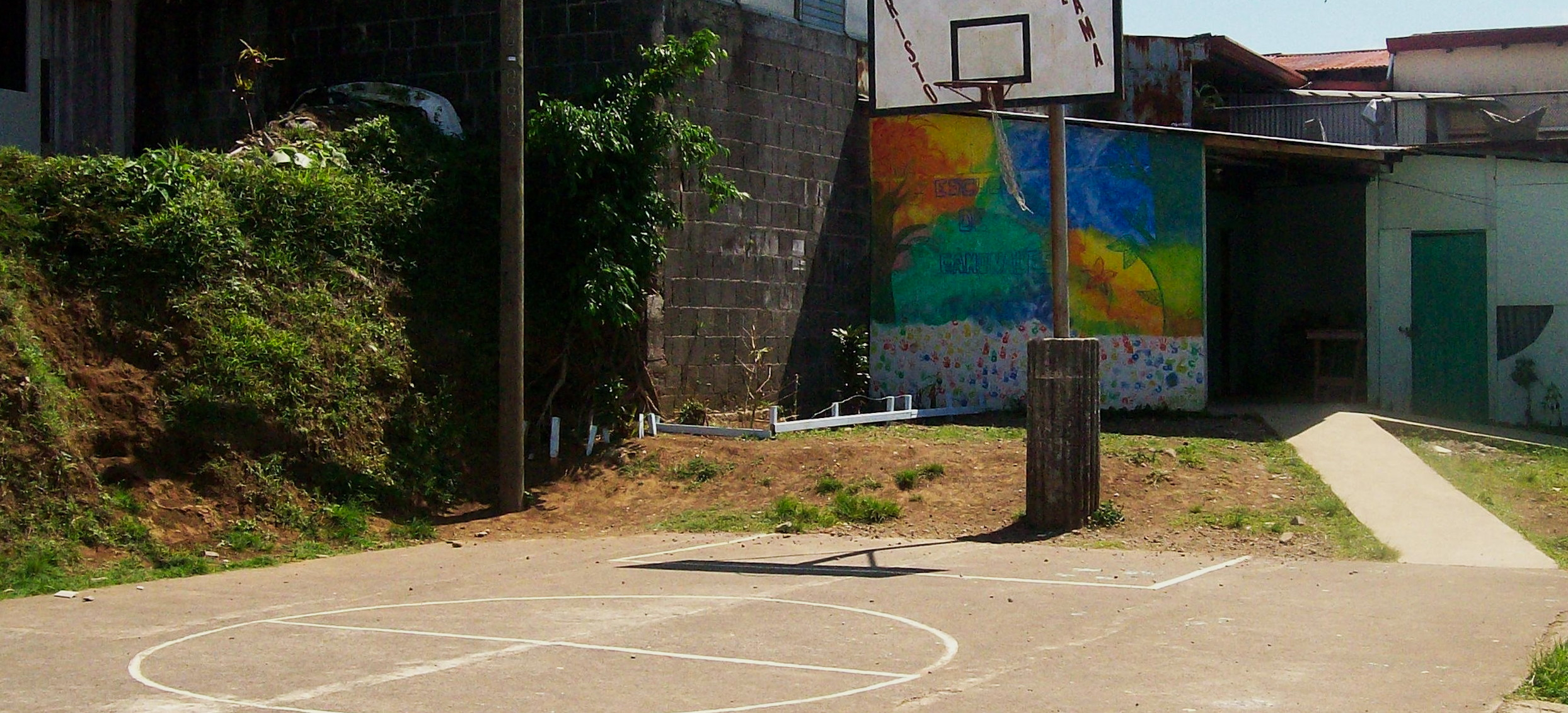
Primary school in Costa Rica built by a local mission of the Free Methodist Church

Free Methodist World Missions oversees ministries across Africa, Asia, Europe, Latin America, and the Middle East. Today, 95% of Free Methodists are located outside the United States, and that number is growing daily.

International Child Care Ministries (ICCM), a child sponsorship initiative serves more than 21,000 children in 29 countries around the world. Through education, meals and medical care, children in need are given an opportunity for a better life. Each sponsored child is connected to a Free Methodist congregation or ministry at a local level.

Set Free Movement is seeking to mobilize faith communities, financial partners, and all segments of society towards ending human trafficking and creating new futures through community-based action.

Volunteers in Service Abroad (VISA) connects volunteers from the Free Methodist Church in the US and UK with Free Methodist World Missions for hands-on ministry internationally.

The church currently has ministry over 88 countries, including:

Africa	Asia	Europe	Latin America	Middle East	North America
Angola; Botswana; Burundi; Cameroon; Democratic Republic of Congo; Eswatini; Ethiopia; Ghana; Guinea Bissau; Guinea Conakry; Ivory Coast; Kenya; Liberia; Malawi; Mozambique; Nigeria; Republic of Congo (Brazzaville); Rwanda; São Tomé and Príncipe; Senegal; Sierra Leone; South Africa; South Sudan; Tanzania; Togo; Uganda; Zambia; Zimbabwe	Australia; Cambodia; Fiji; India; Japan; Philippines; South Korea; Sri Lanka; Taiwan; Thailand	Albania; Belgium; Bulgaria; France; Greece; Hungary; Republic of Ireland; North Macedonia; Portugal; Romania; Spain; Sweden; Ukraine; United Kingdom	Antigua; Argentina; Bahamas; Bolivia; Brazil; Chile; Colombia; Costa Rica; Dominican Republic; Ecuador; El Salvador; Haiti; Honduras; Mexico; Nicaragua; Panama; Paraguay; Peru; Puerto Rico; Uruguay; 360 Mission District (Costa Rica)	Egypt; Iraq; Jordan; Israel; Palestine	Canada; United States

== Higher education ==
B. T. Roberts began what is now Roberts Wesleyan University, formerly Roberts Wesleyan College, in 1866. Spring Arbor College followed in 1873 (renamed Spring Arbor University in 2001), Seattle Pacific University in 1891, and Greenville College (renamed Greenville University in 2017) in 1892. Central College began in 1914, a continuation of Orleans Seminary begun in 1884. Los Angeles Pacific College existed from 1903 to 1965.

The following educational institutions are a part of the Association of Free Methodist Educational Institutions. The schools are not owned by the denomination but meet a set of requirements to maintain this relationship.

- Central Christian College, McPherson, KS
- Greenville University, Greenville, IL
- Roberts Wesleyan University, North Chili, NY
- Spring Arbor University, Spring Arbor, MI
- Seattle Pacific University, Seattle, WA

In addition, the Free Methodist Church is one of several denominations supporting Azusa Pacific University (Azusa, CA). Wessington Springs College is a former, now closed institution which was located in South Dakota. Internationally, there is Osaka Christian College of the Japanese Free Methodist Church, Hope Africa University, a recently founded school in Bujumbura, Burundi, Haiti Providence University, and the Faculdade de Teologia Metodista Livre, São Paulo, Brazil.

Through the John Wesley Seminary Foundation (JWSF) graduate students who are preparing for full-time ministry in the Free Methodist Church are provided a grant or loan at the following affiliated schools:

- Asbury Theological Seminary – (KY, FL, TN, OK, CO Campuses)
- Azusa Pacific Seminary, Azusa, CA
- Northeastern Seminary at Roberts Wesleyan University, Rochester, NY
- Portland Seminary at George Fox Evangelical Seminary, Portland, OR
- Seattle Pacific Seminary, Seattle, WA
- Wesley Biblical Seminary, Jackson, MS
- Wesley House of Studies at Baylor University’s Truett Theological Seminary, Waco, TX
- Wesley Seminary at Indiana Wesleyan University, Marion, IN

== Publishing ==
Like John Wesley before him, B. T. Roberts recognized the Christian's responsibility for publishing.

Before the founding of the church in 1860, B. T. Roberts began publication of a monthly journal, The Earnest Christian. In 1868 The Free Methodist (now Light & Life Magazine) began. A publishing house was established in 1886 to produce books, periodicals and Sunday school curriculum and literature.

=== Beginnings ===
Early leaders, T. B. Arnold and B. T. Roberts privately financed and produced several publications.

The official publishing institution was established by the church at the 1886 General Conference. The church purchased the publishing business built by Rev. T. B. Arnold for $8,000. Arnold was named first publisher and B. T. Roberts was elected editor of The Free Methodist. The Free Methodist Publishing House is recognized under its trade name Light and Life Press.

=== Growth and development ===
The Free Methodist Publishing House operated at three locations in Chicago, Illinois. In February 1935, it moved along with Free Methodist Headquarters to Winona Lake, Indiana.

During its history, the Free Methodist Publishing House built up a plant and accumulated property worth several hundred thousand dollars. It also contributed thousands of dollars out of its profits to other activities of the church.

Over the years, as the ministry of the Free Methodist Church expanded, various departments of the general church gradually moved into Free Methodist Publishing House accommodations. This was provided at vast cost and without the investment of any capital by the general church.

In 1960, the Free Methodist Publishing House board issued a deed in favor of the general church, whereby the church became the owner of the old property, plus nearly eight acres of land. For this the general church paid nothing, but agreed to make payments of $5,000 per year over a ten-year period to the Free Methodist Publishing House.

=== Audio publications ===
In 1944 the Free Methodist Church began a weekly radio show called The Light and Life Radio Hour which featured hymns, sermons, prayer, and scripture reading. The show ran until 1980 and featured several different hosts over the years including Dr. Leroy Lowell, Myron F. Boyd, and Robert Andrews.

In 2016 Josh Avery began The FMC Radio Show which was a spiritual successor to The Light and Life Radio Hour but embodied a very different focus. In a podcast format, the show is subtitled "your officially unofficial source for all things Free Methodist". Instead of worship and sermon, the show means to act as a uniting factor in the Free Methodist Church by informing listeners about different things that are happening in the denomination.

Today, the Light+Life podcast features ministries of the Free Methodist Church that tell their stories of ministry fruitfulness.

=== Ministry ===
Arnold’s Commentary was published from 1894 to 1980. In the late 1950s and early 1960s the church pioneered fully graded church school materials. In 1960 the Aldersgate Biblical Series was developed as the only inductive curriculum of its time.

A fully equipped printing area consisting of letterpresses, offset press, cutters, folders, bindery, linotypes etc. contributed toward making the church independent of commercial printers for the production for its printing needs at that time.

Acting on the recommendation of its executive committee, the board voted in 1988 to phase out printing operations. This decision and the 1989 General Conference decision to move the Press and Headquarters from Winona Lake to Indianapolis in 1990 shifted the focus of the Press. Where formerly, the Press produced and published Sunday school curriculum, this venture is now carried on in cooperation with other holiness denominations.

Beginning in 2008, the Wesleyan Publishing House, publishing arm of the Wesleyan Church, began serving the distribution and customer service needs of Light and Life Press.

=== Mission statement ===
Light & Life Communications, the official publishing arm of the Free Methodist Church, is a not-for-profit corporation that exists to serve in partnership with its parent body, the Free Methodist Church. Its primary purpose is to publish and distribute materials that enable the church to fulfill its stated mission. Light & Life Communications also offers its services and materials to all who seek to make Christ known.

== Publications ==
- Light + Life Communications is the publishing division of the Free Methodist Church.
- Light + Life Magazine is the official magazine of the Free Methodist Church USA, published online. It includes in-depth journalism and interviews exploring Christian faith. Each issue is also translated into Spanish and published concurrently as Revista Luz y Vida. Jeff Finley is the magazine's executive editor.
- Light + Life Bookstore is the official bookstore of Free Methodist Church USA. Free Methodist books and exclusive titles on Christian faith and Wesleyan holiness theology.
- The Light + Life podcast hosts conversations that deepen people's faith through the Light+Life of Jesus Christ.
- Free Methodist World Missions Heartbeat is the monthly magazine of Free Methodist World Missions.
- Free Methodist Conversations is an online resource for discussing important values and issues.
