= Rick Huskey =

American minister (born 1950)

The Reverend Rick Huskey
- Born: Richard Huskey; May 19, 1950; Minneapolis, Minnesota, U.S.
- Died: June 15, 2025
- Education: M.D.; D.Min.; M.Div
- Alma mater: St. Olaf College; Garrett Theological Seminary; Chicago Theological Seminary
- Years active: 1971–2004
- Religion: Christianity (Methodist)
- Church: United Methodist Church
- Ordained: June 14, 2025
- Congregations served: Good Samaritan United Methodist Church, Edina

Rick Huskey was an American minister. He, alongside Gene Leggett, co-founded the United Methodist Gay Clergy Caucus, which later became known as Affirmation.

== Activism ==
In 1971, Huskey and other college students started the Northfield Gay Liberation Front, which was one of the first publicly run LGBT groups for college students. Huskey met Gene Leggett at the 1972 General Conference in Atlanta for Methodist clergy. The two attempted to engage other delegates in conversations about homosexuality and the church, though few delegates responded positively. The conference attendees issued the Hand Amendment, which was unfavorable to homosexual clergy.

The following spring Huskey and Leggett traveled across the East Coast and started a network of gay and lesbian United Methodist clergy. At the 1976 United Methodist General Conference, Huskey served on the theological task force of the Gay United Methodists network.

== Ministry ==
In 1974, after receiving his Doctor of Ministry degree from Chicago Theological Seminary, Huskey returned to Minnesota where he was an associate pastor at Good Samaritan United Methodist Church in Edina. In a discussion about pastoral appointments, Huskey told his bishop that he was gay and that he wanted to start a ministry for gay and lesbians in Minnesota. The bishop placed Huskey on "voluntary location" which removed him from his parish position.

When Huskey was removed, over 100 gay men and lesbians were involved in a protest during the Minnesota Annual Conference ordination service to protest Huskey's removal. The protest was organized by Gene Leggett who had also led similar protests in Southwest Texas Annual Conference sessions.

Huskey was ordained as an elder in the United Methodist Church on June 14, 2025. He died the following day.

== See also ==
- Karen Oliveto
- Paul Abels
- Homosexuality and Methodism
