= Melvin E. Wheatley =

American bishop (1915–2009)

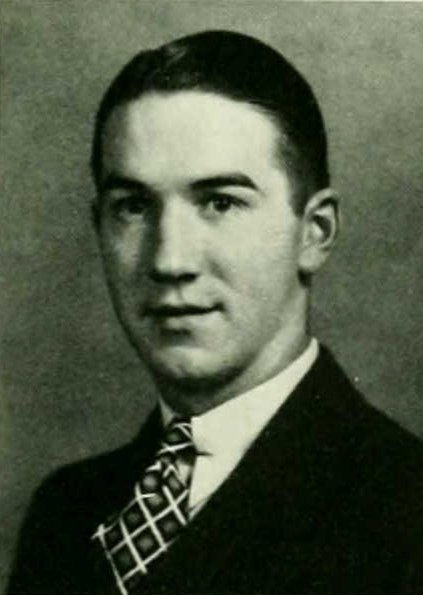
- Melvin E. Wheatley Jr. in 1936
- Born: Melvin Ernest Wheatley Jr. May 7, 1915; Lewisville, Pennsylvania, U.S.
- Died: March 1, 2009 (aged 93); Mission Viejo, California, U.S.
- Education: American University (BA); Drew Theological School
- Occupations: bishop; clergyman
- Title: Former bishop of the United Methodist Church
- Spouse: Lucille Elizabeth Maris (m. 1939)
- Children: 3

Melvin E. Wheatley (May 7, 1915 – March 1, 2009) was a bishop best known for appointing the first openly gay pastor in the United Methodist Church.

== Biography ==
=== Background ===
Wheatley was born in Lewisville, Pennsylvania, the son and grandson of Methodist ministers.

=== Education ===
Wheatley was an honor student at American University in Washington, DC with a major in religion. In his senior year, he was the president of the Student Council, the Student Christian Association, and the captain of a basketball team.

He went on to earn a divinity degree at Drew University in New Jersey.

=== Early career ===
While at Drew, Wheatley served as an assistant instructor in the department of Biblical literature. He also taught philosophy for one semester at Modesto Junior College.

After graduating from Drew in 1939, Wheatley's first pulpit assignment was in Lincoln, Delaware. Three years later, he served as associate pastor of First Methodist Church in Fresno, California.

=== Lifelong supporter of diversity and inclusion ===
During World War II, while in Fresno, he raised eyebrows, when he moved into the home of a Japanese family that had been sent to an internment camp in order to prevent their place from being vandalized.

In 1964, while serving as pastor of the Westwood United Methodist Church near the campus of UCLA, he exchanged pulpits with Rev. L.L. White of Holman in the West Adams neighborhood of Los Angeles, a Methodist church with a predominantly Black congregation.

In 1972, Wheatley was appointed a bishop of the United Methodist Church. The same year, the Church took its first official stand against homosexuality. At the Church's 1980 General Conference he was the only bishop that refused to sign a statement condemning homosexuality.

In 1981, Julian Rush, an associate pastor at First United Methodist Church in Boulder, Colorado, was under fire when he came out as gay. Wheatley, who was the bishop of the Rocky Mountain Conference which includes the entire state of Colorado, hoped that a compromise could be reached that would allow Rush to stay at his post.

When an agreement could not be reached with First Methodist, in a controversial move, Wheatley assigned Rush to the St. Paul United Methodist Church in Denver, which had a significant number of openly gay congregants. This was the first time that a United Methodist bishop appointed an openly gay pastor. Prior to the appointment, Wheatley wrote a letter to all of the ministers in the Conference in support of Rush which included the following statement:

Homosexuality quite like heterosexuality is neither a virtue nor an accomplishment. Homosexual orientation is a mysterious gift of God's grace communicated through an exceedingly complex set of chemical, biological, chromosomal, hormonal, environmental, developmental factors totally outside my homosexual friends' control. Their homosexuality is a gift, neither a virtue nor a sin. What they do with their homosexuality, however, is definitely their personal, moral and spiritual responsibility. Their behavior as homosexuals may be very sinful---brutal, exploitive, selfish, promiscuous, superficial. Their behavior as homosexuals, on the other hand, may be beautiful---tender, considerate, loyal, other-centered, profound.

In 1984, Wheatley retired to Laguna Woods in Orange County, California.

=== Personal life ===
He married Lucile Maris in June 1939. His wife was a vocalist that sang with various church choirs. This union produced three sons. His son John came out as gay to the family in 1973.

=== Death ===
Wheatley died March 1, 2009, in Mission Viejo, California, after a long illness. He was survived by his wife, sons Paul and James, and three grandchildren. John died of melanoma in 1984.

“So many gay men and women who have been ministers in the church were in essence thrown under the bus. He kept that from happening to me,” Rush, who remained a minister in good standing, told The Los Angeles Times shortly after Wheatley's death. “He really pushed the bishops in the church to start reevaluating. There has been a huge upheaval since then, which has been very healthy.”

=== See also ===
Paul Abels
Homosexuality and Methodism
Gene Leggett
LGBT-affirming religious groups
Karen Oliveto
Reconciling Ministries Network
Julian Rush
