= Ted Mollegen =

American engineer and business executive

- Born: Albert Theodore Mollegen Jr. August 13, 1937; Meridian, Mississippi, U.S.
- Died: September 26, 2023 (aged 86)
- Occupations: Engineer and corporate executive
- Spouse: Glennis Ruth Gralton (m. 1962; died 2013)
- Children: 2
- Family: Albert Mollegen (father); Anne Mollegen Smith (sister); J. H. Rush (granduncle); Leslie Rush (cousin)

Ted Mollegen was an American engineer and corporate executive.

== Early life and background ==
Albert Theodore "Ted" Mollegen Jr. was born in Meridian, Mississippi on August 13, 1937, the eldest of two children of (Harriette) Ione Rush and Albert Mollegen. His father was a religious scholar. Prior to her marriage, Ione edited a society column for The Meridian News. His grand-uncle J. H. Rush founded the first private hospital in Meridian.

As a youngster, the family moved to Alexandria, Virginia where the family lived on the campus of the Virginia Theological Seminary, where his father was a professor. Mollegen attended the adjacent Episcopal High School, then an all-boys school. His classmates included John McCain.

== Career ==
In 1971, Mollegen joined Analysis & Technology (A&T), which at the time was a small defense contractor based in Connecticut which employed only a few dozen people. Five years later he was named president and CEO. Under his leadership, A&T grew into a diversified company earning in excess of $100 million annually in revenue with a staff of over 1,500.
