= Julian Rush =

American clergyman and composer

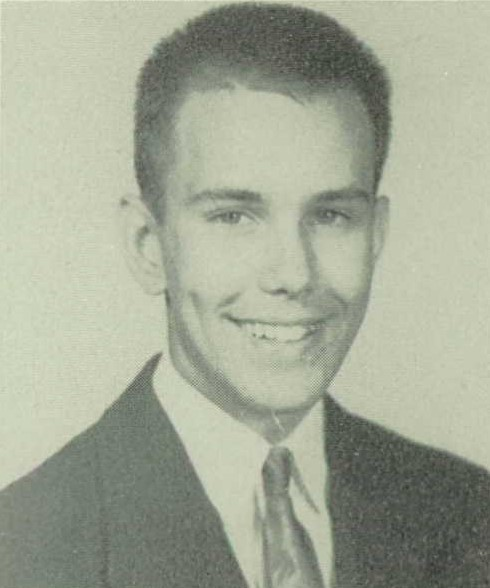
- Julian Rush's senior class photo at Meridian High School, 1954
- Born: Julian Bailey Rush; August 24, 1936; Meridian, Mississippi, U.S.
- Died: November 28, 2023 (aged 87); Sun City West, Arizona, U.S.
- Education: Belhaven College (BA); Perkins School of Theology (STM)
- Occupations: Non-profit administrator; clergyman; composer; playwright
- Title: Former executive director, Colorado AIDS Project
- Spouse: Margaret Salena House (m. 1965; div. 1981)
- Children: 2
- Family: J. H. Rush (granduncle); Leslie Rush (first cousin once removed); Anne Mollegen Smith (second cousin); Al and Fred Key (second cousins once removed)

Julian Bailey Rush (August 24, 1936 - November 28, 2023) was a clergyman, composer, playwright, and administrator, who prompted a national debate in the early 1980s when he became the first openly gay pastor appointed by the United Methodist Church (UMC).

== Biography ==
=== Family and background ===
Julian Bailey Rush was born in Meridian, Mississippi, to Julian Otis and Rebecca (Bailey) Rush. He comes from a family of healthcare professionals. His father was a pharmacist. Both grandfathers and several relatives were doctors.

He attended Meridian High School and served as drum major his senior year. While attending school there, he participated in theatrical productions at Meridian Junior College, which was considered an extension of the high school. Upon graduation, he attended Meridian Junior College for two years. He completed his undergraduate education at Belhaven College in Jackson.

In 1965, he married Margaret Salena House in Munford, Alabama. The union produced two sons.

=== Early career ===
After studying church drama at the Perkins School of Theology at Southern Methodist University, he worked as a youth minister in Texas and staged a successful production of Jesus Christ Superstar.

In 1976, assigned to First United Methodist Church in Boulder, Colorado and staged original Christian themed productions for the church, including "The Man Who Can Save the Day."

By the late 1970s, unfulfilled in his marriage, Rush was in counseling and began to come to terms with his sexuality. He was gay. Rush separated from his wife in 1979 and began volunteering at the Gay and Lesbian Center in his spare time.

=== Coming out sparks national debate ===
In 1981, he came out as gay to some members of his church. The response was initially positive, but after the senior minister, other church elders and the larger congregation learned of Rush's disclosure, several members of the church expressed displeasure in having an openly gay pastor in their church. The United Methodist Church which had recently initiated a ban on “practicing homosexuals” in the church, was now put to the test. Both supporters and critics of Rush threatened to leave the church. The critics because of their objection to having a gay youth pastor, but also from supporters who didn't want to be members of a congregation that was openly hostile to gay people.

The divisiveness on the issue created an untenable situation for the church and eventually they saw no way to address the issue, but to have Rush leave the congregation.

In a controversial move, Bishop Melvin E. Wheatley assigned Rush to the smaller St. Paul United Methodist Church in Denver. St. Paul was one of the few United Methodist Churches in the United States at the time that openly welcomed gay people to their congregation. This was the first time that an openly gay pastor had received an appointment by the Methodist Church. Wheatley was severely criticized for his actions but survived the controversy.

Despite working only part-time at St. Paul, Rush's arrival as an openly gay pastor helped increase the church's membership. Unfortunately, Rush's battles with the United Methodist Church establishment continued. This included two separate attempts to de-commission him as a minister. These de-commissioning efforts proved unsuccessful because it required proof that Rush was a practicing homosexual to be removed by the Church.

Despite these setbacks, Rush's courage in coming out and the national publicity that followed served as an inspiration to other gay clergy. One of those individuals was Karen Oliveto, who would later become the first openly lesbian bishop in the United Methodist Church.

=== Colorado AIDS Project ===
At the same time, Rush was spending more time at the Gay and Lesbian Center just as the AIDS crisis was beginning. This led to his appointment in 1983 as the first director of the Colorado AIDS Project, which became the leading organization in Colorado to assist people infected with the virus.

In the beginning of the Colorado AIDS Project, Rush was the only paid staff member working with two volunteers, and eight clients. For at least two years, Rush continued to work part-time at St. Paul despite spending between 50 and 60 hours a week with the Colorado AIDS Project.

By the time he left the Colorado AIDS Project in 2000, the organization had grown to over 50 paid employees and an annual budget of over $3 million.

=== In the Midst of New Dimensions ===
The hymn "Ours the Journey," which is also known by the title, "In the Midst of New Dimensions," is Rush's best known creative work. It was written for the 1985 Rocky Mountain Annual Conference of the United Methodist Church promoting its theme of diversity. During the same conference the Rev. Roy Sano was commissioned as the UMC's first Japanese-American bishop.

"Ours the Journey" was first published in Chalice Hymnal (1995) in an abridged version containing four stanzas. A five stanza version which contains three stanzas from the Chalice Hymnal version plus two additional stanzas was published in The New Century Hymnal (1996), The Faith We Sing (2000), Sing the Faith (2003), and Glory to God: The Presbyterian Hymnal (2013). Additionally, a six stanza version is published in Shaping Sanctuary: Proclaiming God's Grace in an Inclusive Church (2000), a book of worship resources. The unabridged version of "Ours the Journey" contains seven stanzas.

The two stanzas omitted from The Faith We Sing, which is the most widely distributed version, are arguably the most controversial. One stanza contains the line "Gays and lesbians together fighting to be realized." Another states that people of different races are a "rainbow coalition, all of value in thy sight."

=== Death and lasting impact ===
Rush died on November 28, 2023, in Sun City West, Arizona.

Shortly after Rush was assigned to St. Paul Methodist Church, it became one of the first in the nation to declare itself a Reconciling Congregation, a term the UMC uses to describe churches that openly embrace the LGBT Community.

In 1997, First UMC in Boulder became a Reconciling Congregation. Reflecting the changing times, Rush's memorial was held there June 29, 2024 featuring the Denver Gay Men's Chorus singing, "Ours the Journey."

"Without someone like Julian," Bishop Karen Oliveto said at the time of his death, "I would have lived in despair, totally wondering how can I rectify that the God who made me called me into this, but the church doesn’t want me and I think my life would have been much different."

== Selected works ==
=== Hymns ===
- The Call of God
- Come to the Table
- Ours the Journey (also known as In the Midst of New Dimensions)

=== Plays ===
- Jesus Song
- The Man Who Can Save the Day
- PT was Here

== See also ==
- Paul Abels
- Bill Johnson
- Gene Leggett
- Karen Oliveto
- Homosexuality and Methodism
- LGBT-affirming religious groups
- Reconciling Ministries Network
