= Anne Mollegen Smith =

American magazine editor, and writer

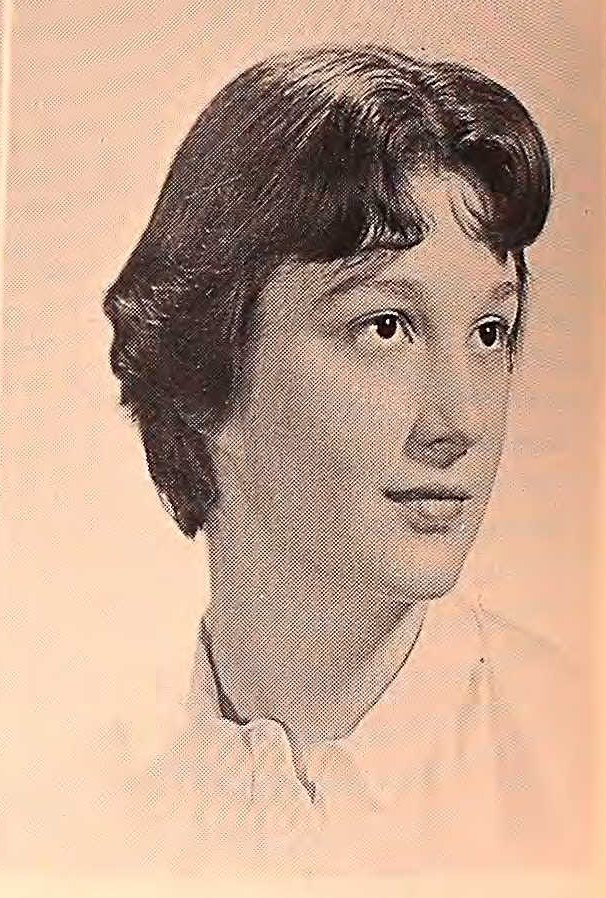
- Anne Rush Mollegen at Smith College, 1961
- Born: Anne Rush Mollegen; Meridian, Mississippi, U.S.
- Education: Smith College (BA)
- Occupations: Magazine editor and writer
- Notable credit(s): Editor-in-chief, Redbook
- Title: Former editor-in-chief Redbook, Working Woman, and McCall's.
- Spouse: David Fay Smith
- Children: 1
- Family: Albert Mollegen (father); Ted Mollegen (brother); J. H. Rush (granduncle); Leslie Rush (first cousin once removed); Julian Rush (second cousin); Al and Fred Key (second cousins once removed)

Anne Mollegen Smith is an American magazine editor, and writer. She was the first woman to serve as editor-in-chief of Redbook.

== Early life and background ==
Anne Rush Mollegen was born in Meridian, Mississippi, the youngest of two children of (Harriette) Ione Rush and Albert Theodore Mollegen, Sr. Her father was a religious scholar who wrote Christianity and Modern Man (Bobbs-Merrill, 1961), a book on Christian apologetics. Prior to her marriage, Anne's mother edited a society column for The Meridian News. Her grand-uncle J. H. Rush founded the first private hospital in Meridian.

As a small child, the family moved to Alexandria, Virginia. During her formative years, the family lived on the campus of the Virginia Theological Seminary, where her father was a professor. Her brother, Albert, Jr. (commonly known as Ted), attended the adjacent Episcopal High School, then an all-boys school. Anne attended the formerly all-girls St. Agnes School in Alexandria.

She graduated from Smith College where she earned a B.A. degree in English literature.

== Career ==
Shortly after graduating from Smith College, she was hired as an assistant editor at Ladies' Home Journal. Within a few years, she landed at Redbook where she rose up through the ranks from associate editor to become the first woman to serve as editor-in-chief for the magazine in 1981.

In 1983, she briefly served as executive editor of Glamour.

Smith served as editor-in-chief of Working Woman from 1984 to 1989. In December 1988, decades before MeToo, the magazine published what it claimed was the first scientific study of sexual harassment in the workplace. Of the 160 corporations that participated in the study, 90% reported complaints of unwanted sexual advances by men toward female employees. Over one third of these corporations had been sued by victims. "If companies don't deal with it better," Smith said at the time, "this is a financial time bomb for American business."

The Working Woman sexual harassment survey would later be referenced during the hearings before the U.S. Congress on H.R. 1, known as the Civil Rights Act of 1991. As a result, this important study conducted with Freada Klein of Klein Associates (who drafted the executive report), is now part of the public record.

In 1986, she also served as co-chair of the board of Nuclear Times magazine.

Prior to her next editorial assignment, Smith was a past president of the Women's Media Society.

In 1989, Smith was named editor-in-chief of McCall's. She served in that capacity for approximately four years.

After she left McCall's, she briefly served as executive editor and then editor-in-chief for Her New York. The latter debuted on October 1, 1993 as a penta-weekly newspaper (or simply a daily published Monday through Friday) aimed at women based in New York City. Her New York was founded by businessman Steven Hoffenberg shortly after he left the New York Post, despite his assets being frozen due to a pending civil fraud suit against him by the Securities and Exchange Commission. Smith left Her New York after only a few weeks, and later openly criticized the paper's shift in editorial policy from articles targeted to sophisticated working women to pieces deemed more "hip," for an example, a feature on former porn star Annie Sprinkle. She also accused the publication of "misogyny."

Other editorial assignments include stints at startup publications, NY city life (a lifestyle magazine) in 1997, and Space.com Illustrated in 2000.

Later, Smith served as editor-in-chief at the Art of Simple Living. She has written on a variety of topics including personal finance, career planning, and country music. She also worked as a consultant for several top corporations including Target.

She co-founded and writes for the blog, Brooklyn Artisan. Additionally, Smith is a poet.

== Awards ==
- 2nd prize, Speak for Democracy contest, Alexandria, Virginia
- Karig Writing prize
