= Dr. Rush =

Dr. Rush may refer to:

- Dr. Benjamin Rush, a founding father of the United States.
- Dr. J. H. Rush, an American physician.
- Dr. Nicholas Rush, a fictional character in the Canadian-American television series Stargate Universe.
