= Homosexuality and Methodism =

Methodist viewpoints concerning homosexuality are diverse because there is no one denomination which represents all Methodists. The World Methodist Council, which represents most Methodist denominations (and united churches including Methodists), has no official statements regarding sexuality. Various Methodist denominations themselves take different stances on the issue of homosexuality, with many denominations holding homosexual practice to be sinful, while other denominations ordain LGBT clergy and marry same-sex couples. The positions of the various Methodist denominations around the globe are outlined in this article.

== Background ==
=== John Wesley and Thomas Blair ===
In 1732, John Wesley, the principal founder of Methodism, was engaged in prison ministry when he encountered Thomas Blair, an inmate incarcerated on charges related to homosexuality. While not defending his actions, Wesley spoke up to the Vice Chancellor against the inhumane treatment of Thomas Blair in prison. Blair also faced the possibility of the death penalty. Wesley defended Blair in court, and while he was found guilty, his life was spared and John Wesley raised funds to pay his fine so he could be released.

== Teaching by Methodist denomination ==
=== African Methodist Episcopal Church ===
The African Methodist Episcopal Church unanimously voted to forbid ministers from blessing same-sex unions in July 2004. The church leaders stated that homosexual activity "clearly contradicts [their] understanding of Scripture" and that the call of the African Methodist Episcopal Church "is to hear the voice of God in our Scriptures". In the same year, the General Conference voted to "appoint a sexual ethics discernment committee to make recommendations to the denomination about LGBTQ matters." As of 2015, "the AME Church’s Doctrine and Discipline [had] no explicit policy regarding gay clergy."

Regarding LGBT clergy, in 2003, Bishop Richard Franklin Norris, a regional bishop, declared his official position of the African Methodist Episcopal Church and instructed pastors of the denomination to read it to their congregations:

The official position of the African Methodist Episcopal Church is not in favor of the ordination of openly gay persons to the ranks of clergy in our church. This position reaffirms our published position papers, public statements and prior rulings, all of which indicate that we do not support the ordination of openly gay persons.

In 2021, the AME General Conference voted against a motion to allow same-sex marriages in church, but confirmed that "it does not bar LGBTQ individuals from serving as pastors or otherwise leading the denomination." The same AME General Conference voted "to appoint a sexual ethics discernment committee to make recommendations to the denomination about LGBTQ matters."

=== African Methodist Episcopal Zion Church ===
The African Methodist Episcopal Zion Church opposes homosexuality, with church leaders citing Genesis 1&2, 19:1-9; Leviticus 18:22, 20:13; 1 Corinthians 6:9; Romans 1:26-27; and 1 Timothy 1:10 as support for this position. At its 1996 Quadrennial Conference, the African Methodist Episcopal Zion Church declared homosexuality and same-sex marriages to be “morally wrong.”

=== Allegheny Wesleyan Methodist Connection ===
The Allegheny Wesleyan Methodist Connection, in its Discipline, teaches in ¶44:

Further, by observing the teaching of Scripture regarding sexual conduct. We believe that God has commanded that no intimate sexual activity be engaged in outside of marriage between a man and a woman. We believe that any form of homosexuality, lesbianism, bi-sexuality, bestiality, incest, fornication, adultery, and any attempt to alter one’s gender by surgery or appearance are sinful perversions of God’s gift of sex. The party guilty of such conduct has by his or her act forfeited membership in the church.
Gen. 2:24; 19:5, 13; 26:8–10; Lev. 18:1–30; Rom. 1:26–29; 1 Cor. 5:1; 6:9; 1 Thes. 4:1–8; Heb. 13:4.

¶340 outlines the consequences for clergymen engaged in homosexual activity:

When an elder or a minister shall have been convicted of the crime of fornication, adultery, or homosexual activity, he or she shall be expelled from the Connection and shall never be restored to membership in the Connection; and the Connection shall not receive from any church anyone who has been convicted of these crimes after entering the ministry. But this shall not prohibit membership in an Allegheny Wesleyan Methodist church when the guilty person repents.

=== Argentine Evangelical Methodist Church ===
The church, also called the Evangelical Methodist Church in Argentina, allows each congregation to make its own position. The church has stated that they have "given, on a national level, freedom so that each congregation accompany...these couples. We permit freedom of action in order to bless them".

=== Bible Methodist Connection of Churches ===
The Bible Methodist Connection of Churches, in its Discipline, states in ¶42 that:

We believe that God has given to us the gift of sexuality which may be exercised only within the boundaries of covenanted, monogamous, heterosexual marriage. Sexual relationships outside of marriage and sexual relationships between persons of the same sex are immoral and sinful. Thus, we condemn homosexuality, lesbianism, pederasty, bisexuality, bestiality, incest, pedophilia, fornication, adultery, pornography, and other forms of licentiousness as sinful perversions of the divine gift of sexuality. We believe that God disapproves of and forbids any attempt to alter one’s gender by surgery or appearance.

In ¶44, it further states that:

No practicing homosexual/lesbian shall be ordained as a minister or missionary or shall be used as a teacher, office holder or other employee in any of our ministries. They shall not be eligible to be members, lay leaders, or ministerial leaders in our churches. If any of the aforementioned persons or office holders practice this lifestyle, they forfeit their right to any office or membership in our churches. Practicing this lifestyle shall constitute automatic removal from membership or office.

¶45 of the Discipline of the Bible Methodist Connection of Churches specifically prohibits its clergymen from officiating at same-sex marriages.

=== Christian Methodist Episcopal Church ===
The Christian Methodist Episcopal Church opposes homosexuality, with church leaders citing Genesis 1&2, 19:1-9; Leviticus 18:22, 20:13; 1 Corinthians 6:9; Romans 1:26-27; and 1 Timothy 1:10 as support for this position.

=== Church of the Nazarene ===
The Church of the Nazarene, a Methodist denomination aligned with the holiness movement, teaches that marriage is only defined for heterosexual couples. As such, the denomination does not allow same-gender marriages.

=== Church of North India ===
The Church of North India, uniting different Protestants including Methodists, takes a traditional stand on human sexuality maintaining that marriage is defined heterosexually. The church opposes the criminalization of homosexuality, but also opposed the consecration of the first homosexual bishop in the Episcopal Church, the Rt. Rev. Gene Robinson. In 2009, the church both opposed the supreme court's decision to criminalize homosexuality, and also opposed same-sex marriage.

=== Church of South India ===
The Church of South India (CSI) is a united church representing Anglicans, Methodists, and Presbyterians. The CSI "is a relatively liberal Protestant church which has, since 1984, allowed women to become pastors. 'CSI has been liberal on these issues. It has taken up issues of gender, dalits and landlessness. It has to address the issue of sexual minorities too"'. In 2009, the Rev. Christopher Rajkumar, speaking for the CSI, supported civil rights for gay people. In 2015, St. Mark's Cathedral in Bangalore hosted an event challenging homophobia where the Rev. Vincent Rajkumar affirmed his support for LGBT rights. The BBC has listed the CSI as being among the churches open to blessing same-gender couples.

=== Evangelical Methodist Church ===
The Evangelical Methodist Church maintains that the biblical record condemns homosexuality as evidenced in Leviticus 18:22, Romans 1:26–27, and 1 Corinthians 6:9–19. It teaches that homosexual practices are "sin leading to spiritual death and eternal punishment. Nevertheless, homosexuality is no greater a sin than adultery, murder, stealing, among others. As a result, non-celibate gay people are barred from becoming members of the Evangelical Methodist Church. Moreover, practicing homosexuals are prohibited from becoming candidates for ordained ministry. The Church upholds that all individuals are entitled to certain rights and protection of the civil law; nevertheless, it opposes all civil legislation that supports homosexuality as a normal life style. All homosexuals who seek faith in Jesus Christ as Saviour and Lord, and cease to practice homosexual acts are welcomed into the fellowship of the Evangelical Methodist Church.

=== Evangelical Methodist Church Conference ===
The Evangelical Methodist Church Conference teaches in its Book of Discipline that homosexual practice is sinful. It states:

Holy matrimony is a sacred institution of divine origin. Marriage is intended to be between one man and one woman. The Evangelical Methodist Church therefore stands against, homosexuality, bestiality, and all sexual perversion and so-called "alternative life-styles" which are an abomination to the Lord and are strongly condemned in both the Old and New Testaments. (Lev. 18:22; Lev. 20:13; Romans 1:24-28; I Cor. 6:9-10; Gal. 5:1-21) Any person practicing, supportive of or sympathetic to such actions shall not be a member of or hold office in the Evangelical Methodist Church Conference. Neither shall they participate in teaching Sunday School or any manner of ministry within the Evangelical Church Conference. No ministers practicing, supportive of, or sympathetic to such actions will be permitted to pastor any of our churches or participate in the services of the Evangelical Methodist Church Conference. We will continue to show love and compassion to all who are enslaved in sin's degradation, proclaiming full deliverance through the precious blood of Christ.

=== Evangelisch-methodistische Kirche in Germany ===
In November 2022, the Evangelisch-methodistische Kirche (Protestant Methodist Church) in Germany allowed blessing ceremonies for same-sex marriages.

=== Evangelical Wesleyan Church ===
The Evangelical Wesleyan Church, in ¶92.1 and ¶92.2 of its Discipline, teaches that:

God has commanded that no intimate sexual activity be engaged in outside of a marriage between one naturally-born man and one naturally-born woman. It stands opposed to the immoral lifestyles of the day, including but not limited to homosexuality, lesbianism, transsexualism, bisexuality, bestiality, incest, fornication, adultery, pornography, polygamy, bigamy, and living together without legally being married, realizing that these are sinful perversions of God's gracious gifts to mankind. Further, it believes that God disapproves of and forbids any attempt to alter one's gender by surgery or appearance. (Gen. 2:24; Gen. 19:5, 13; Gen. 26:8-9; Lev. 18:1-30; Rom. 1:26-29; I Cor. 5:1, 6-9, I Thess. 4:1-8; Heb. 13:4.) It does not condemn the individual but rejects the practices which are condemned by the Bible as unacceptable conduct. The church believes it is a free right to publicly express this Scriptural position (Romans 1:21-27, Leviticus 18:22). Any current member who becomes engaged in such behaviors shall be considered as having voluntarily withdrawn from membership. The Evangelical Wesleyan Church, Inc., does not recognize the marriage or civil unions between persons of the same sex. All its ministers are expressly forbidden to perform a marriage ceremony between persons of the same gender. A marriage ceremony between persons of the same sex may not be performed in any Evangelical Wesleyan Church or church-related facility.

=== Fellowship of Independent Methodist Churches ===
The Fellowship of Independent Methodist Churches teaches that it is "committed to upholding and defending the doctrines of the Word of God, including the traditional Biblical teaching on marriage."

=== Free Methodist Church ===
As stated in the Book of Discipline (A/342) of the Free Methodist Church, it believes and teaches that

Homosexual behavior, as all sexual deviation, is a perversion of God's created order (Genesis 1-3). The sanctity of marriage and the family is to be preserved against all manner of immoral conduct (Exodus 22:16-17; Deuteronomy 22:23-28; Leviticus 20:10-16), thus the Free Methodist Church does not recognize the legitimacy or participation in the practice of same-sex marriage.

Homosexual behavior is contrary to the will of God as clearly stated in Scripture (Leviticus 18:22; 20:13; Romans 1:26-27; 1 Corinthians 6:9-10; 1 Timothy 1:8-10).

Persons with homosexual inclinations are accountable to God for their behavior (Romans 14:12).

The forgiving and delivering grace of God in Christ is all-sufficient for the homosexual (1 John 1:9; Hebrews 7:25; Luke 4:18; 1 Corinthians 6:9-11). The Church has a personal and corporate responsibility to be God's instrument of healing, restoring love to the homosexual seeking recovery of Christian conduct and life-style (2 Corinthians 2:7-8).

The church opposes legislation which makes homosexual conduct or life-style legitimate.

=== Global Methodist Church ===
The Global Methodist Church formed out of schism and disaffiliation from the United Methodist Church over disputes about human sexuality. The Global Methodist Church is against same-sex marriage. Being in a same-sex relationship is a chargeable offense for clergy in the GMC. The Global Methodist Church's definition of gender is not inclusive of transgender people.

=== Italian Methodist Church ===
The Union of Methodist and Waldensian Churches, of which the Italian Methodist Church is a part, voted in 2010 to bless same-sex relationships. LGBT-affirming church leaders said "the references to homosexuality in the Bible needed to be understood taking into account issue of culture and interpretation, to avoid the danger of Biblical fundamentalism."

=== Methodist Church of Great Britain ===
At the annual Methodist Conference in 1993 in Derby, following long debate at all levels of the Church's life on the basis of a detailed report, the British Methodist Church considered the issues of human sexuality. The Derby Conference in 1993 passed a series of Resolutions which still stand. These resolutions are as follows:

1. The Conference, affirming the joy of human sexuality as God's gift and the place of every human being within the grace of God, recognises the responsibility that flows from this for us all. It therefore welcomes the serious, prayerful and sometimes costly consideration given to this issue by The Methodist Church.
2. All practices of sexuality, which are promiscuous, exploitative or demeaning in any way are unacceptable forms of behaviour and contradict God's purpose for us all.
3. A person shall not be debarred from church on the grounds of sexual orientation in itself.
4. The Conference reaffirms the traditional teaching of the Church on human sexuality; namely chastity for all outside marriage and fidelity within it. The Conference directs that this affirmation is made clear to all candidates for ministry, office and membership, and having established this, affirm that the existing procedures of our church are adequate to deal with all such cases.
5. The Conference resolves that its decision in this debate shall not be used to form the basis of a disciplinary charge against any person in relation to conduct alleged to have taken place before such decisions were made.
6. Conference recognises, affirms and celebrates the participation and ministry of lesbians and gay men in the church. Conference calls on the Methodist people to begin a pilgrimage of faith to combat repression and discrimination, to work for justice and human rights and to give dignity and worth to people whatever their sexuality.

In 2005, the Conference voted "to offer the prospect of blessing services for same-sex couples", but in 2006 the Conference voted to step back but did offer "informal, private prayers to couples". In 2013, the denomination initiated a consultation on blessing same-sex marriages, and, in 2014, after same-sex marriage became legal, the Conference decided in favor of allowing ministers to celebrate same-sex couples entering into civil marriages. Also in 2014, "the Conference resolved that its previous ruling that there was no reason per se to prevent anyone within the Church, ordained or lay, from entering into or remaining within a civil partnership, should also extend to those entering into legally contracted same-sex marriages".

The denomination officially stated that Methodists may enter into same-sex marriages and that "prayers of thanksgiving or celebration may be said, and there may be informal services of thanksgiving or celebration".

On 3 July 2019, the Conference voted by 247 to 48 to adopt a report recommending that same-sex marriages be allowed in British Methodist churches that approve.

On 30 June 2021, the Conference voted to reaffirm the resolution of the 2019 Conference, and consented in principle to the marriage of same-sex couples on Methodist premises and by Methodist ministers and other authorised officers. The traditionalist caucus, Methodist Evangelicals Together, opposed the decision.

=== Methodist Church of New Zealand ===
The Methodist Church of New Zealand, since 2004, has approved of ordaining openly gay and lesbian ministers, and the denomination allows each local congregation to determine its own policy on the issue. In 2013, when same-sex marriage was legalized in New Zealand, congregations that opted to do so were able to perform same-sex marriages.

=== Methodist Church of Peru ===
The Methodist Church of Peru, an autonomous affiliate of the United Methodist Church, has agreed to discuss the issue of homosexuality and the blessing of same-gender unions. Generally, the denomination is considered to be a progressive church in Peru.

=== Methodist Church of Southern Africa ===
The Methodist Church of Southern Africa spoke out against laws criminalizing homosexuality, and, in particular, condemned the anti-homosexuality laws proposed in Uganda. Currently, the denomination is discussing how to approach the issue of same-gender relationships. Currently, “Conference recognises that any decision and subsequent action on the issue of civil unions between same sex partners must await the outcome of the ongoing process of engagement as specified by Conference 2005 and, in the interim, expects Methodist Ministers to continue to offer pastoral care to homosexual individuals." Several courts have concluded that the church's policies are currently accepting of same-sex relationships as long as they are not 'marriages'. In 2020, the MCSA decided that it would not allow ministers to perform same-sex marriages, but also decided that it would not prevent its members, lay or ordained, from entering into a same-sex civil union.

In 2013, the Western Cape High Court found that "the Methodist Church did not have a rule prohibiting its ministers from marrying someone of the same sex". Additionally, in 2015, another court determined that the denomination "even accepts same-sex relationships (as long as such relationships are not solemnised by marriage), which means it is not at the core of the Church’s beliefs". At the Constitutional Court, the church stated that the church "tolerates homosexual relationships but requires its ministers not to enter into same-sex marriages." The Church allowed [gay ministers] to be in a homosexual relationship whilst being a minister, and allowed [a gay minister] to stay in the Church's manse with [a] partner, but drew the line at recognising her same-sex marriage."

=== Methodist Church in Uruguay ===
The Methodist Church in Uruguay has a ministry with persons of diverse sexual orientations. The Church has also resolved that pastors that wish to minister to LGBTQ could do it. Some congregations support blessings of same-sex marriage.

=== Primitive Methodist Church ===
The Primitive Methodist Church teaches that the practice of homosexuality is positively forbidden by Scripture, specifically in Romans 1:26-27 and Leviticus 18:22; 20:13. With regards to marriage, the Primitive Methodist Church believes it to involve the total commitment of one man and one woman.

=== United Church of Canada ===
The United Church of Canada, a member of the World Methodist Council, is a united church which resulted from the merger of multiple denominations including Methodists. The denomination is supportive of LGBT inclusion. The church ordains openly gay and lesbian clergy, and, in 2012, elected its first openly gay moderator to lead the whole denomination. Since 2003, the UCC has supported same-gender marriage.

=== United Methodist Church ===
==== 1968-2000 ====
"Through the labyrinth of booths at the Twin Cities Pride Festival, Faith Forward MN wove its way on Sunday to a row of faith-based organizations. There, we found a stream of interesting stories and perspectives of progressive faith. Here, you'll meet an ordained Methodist minister barred by the United Methodist Church from leading a congregation of his own."

Following the merger creating the United Methodist Church in 1968, the first United Methodist clergy to be defrocked due to being homosexual was Gene Leggett, in 1971.

In 1972 the United Methodist Church added language to its Book of Discipline of The United Methodist Church that "homosexual persons no less than heterosexual persons are individuals of sacred worth." The originally proposed statement ended there; however, this phrase struggled to pass. Don Hand, a delegate from Southwest Texas, suggested that the period be turned into a comma followed by the phrase "though we do not condone the practice of homosexuality and consider this practice incompatible with Christian doctrine," which passed with only the change of the word doctrine to the word teaching. In 2024 this statement was removed from the Church's teachings.

In 1982, Julian Rush was assigned by Bishop Melvin E. Wheatley to a church in Denver as an openly gay man. Wheatley was accused of heresy for making the appointment, but survived the controversy.

Jeanne Audrey Powers was the first woman to be nominated for the office of a bishop in The United Methodist Church. In 1995, the year before she retired, she came out as a lesbian during a sermon she delivered at the national gathering of the Reconciling Ministries Movement.

From 1984 until 2024, the Church officially forbade "self-avowed practicing homosexuals" from being ordained or appointed as ministers.

In 1987, Methodist minister Rose Mary Denman was defrocked for being openly gay.

==== 2000s ====
In 2005, clergy credentials were removed from Irene Elizabeth Stroud after she was convicted in a church trial of violating Church law by engaging in a lesbian relationship; this conviction was later upheld by the Church Judicial Council, the highest court in the Church.

The Church supports "…laws in civil society that define marriage as the union of one man and one woman."

Based on its teaching, the United Methodist Church previously officially prohibited the blessing of weddings of same-sex couples by its clergy and in its churches. As officiating at a same-sex wedding was potentially a chargeable offense, numerous ministers were put on trial and many defrocked. Frank Schaefer was defrocked and penalized because in 2007 he had officiated his son's same-sex wedding, but in 2014, he was re-instated as "the denomination's top court upheld a June decision by a regional appeals committee to reinstate Schaefer's ministerial credentials." The Rev. Val Roseqnuist and retired Bishop Melvin Talbert officiated a same-sex marriage in 2016 and reached a 'just resolution' regarding that, avoiding a church trial.

Clergy were previously officially prohibited from overseeing the vows or signing the union or marriage license for same-sex marriages, only allowed to offer the premarital counseling, prayers, and the homily at the wedding, and read the scriptures. On April 30, 2008, at the General Conference, delegates adopted even more conservative language, stating that Christians are called to "responsible stewardship of this sacred gift" of sexuality and that "sexual relations are affirmed only within the covenant of monogamous, heterosexual marriage." Still, in 2015, the Connectional Table, a general agency of the UMC, proposed a localized option that would permit ministers to officiate same-sex weddings and conferences to ordain openly gay clergy; the Connectional Table, however, cannot legislate church law (a right reserved to the General Conference) and their suggestion was rejected by three-fourths of the delegates at the 2016 General Conference.

As a result of decisions made in April 2008 and August 2009, the United Methodist Church entered into full communion with the Evangelical Lutheran Church in America. The latter denomination allowed individuals in committed homosexual relationships to serve as ministers, while the United Methodist Church requires gay clergy to remain celibate. Despite the fact that full communion allows for the interchangeability of all ordained ministers between the two denominations, Lutheran clergy who are involved in homosexual activity were prohibited to serve in the United Methodist Church in order to uphold the integrity of United Methodist ministerial standards. Nevertheless, the UMC had a more ambiguous policy regarding the ordination of transgender pastors and, in 2008, the Judicial Council ruled that each regional conference could determine their own policy; as a result, some conferences ordained transgender pastors.

Several grassroots organizations not officially recognized by the United Methodist Church have also formed around positions on issues relating to homosexuality. The Confessing Movement within the United Methodist Church seeks to continue to protect the United Methodist Church's current stance on homosexuality, if not make it more rigid. Moreover, another movement, Transforming Congregations, is a Methodist ex-gay ministry whose purpose is to "equip the local church to model and minister sanctified sexuality through biblical instruction, personal and public witness, and compassionate outreach. Meanwhile, the Reconciling Ministries Network seeks to change the United Methodist Church's current teaching on homosexuality in order to make the church more inclusive of LGBTQ people. At the 2008 General Conference of the United Methodist Church, it was decided that the Church would retain its views on homosexuality.

==== 2010s ====
At the General Conference in 2016, the delegates deferred the issue of human sexuality to the Council of Bishops in what has been described as a "'historic action'.

In 2016, the Judicial Council further ruled against mandatory penalties for clergy leaving the current options in place. Nevertheless, the United Methodist Church "implore[s] families and churches not to reject or condemn lesbian and gay members and friends" and commits itself to be in ministry with all persons, affirming that God's grace, love, and forgiveness is available to all. Also, while "clergy cannot preside over the wedding ceremony...bishops say, clergy can assist same-gender couples in finding other venues for their wedding; provide pre-marital counseling; attend the ceremony; read Scripture, pray or offer a homily." The denomination also, for non-ordained employees, decided that "now same-sex spouses of some church employees can receive church benefits" if the state or country allows same-sex marriage.

In 2016, after General Conference, several Annual Conferences voted in favor of non-discrimination clauses that effectively allowed LGBTQ clergy and which indicated that those conferences would refuse to participate in any church trials in which people were being tried for being an active homosexual. The Baltimore-Washington, California-Nevada, California-Pacific, Desert Southwest, New England, New York, Northern Illinois, and Oregon-Idaho Annual Conferences voted in favor of full inclusion for LGBTQ members and clergy. Additionally, the Virginia Annual Conference voted to petition the UMC to allow LGBTQ clergy and same-gender marriages. The Rocky Mountain Annual Conference voted to not consider sexual orientation when electing a bishop. In 2015, the Great Plains and Greater New Jersey Conferences voted to petition the UMC to allow same-gender marriages. In 2014, the Social and Ethics Ministry of the Central Conference in Germany supported an initiative to propose steps toward the full inclusion of LGBT people. In 2012, the Minnesota Conference had voted to oppose bans on same-gender marriage, and the Illinois Great Rivers and West Michigan Conferences voted that it "expressed sadness" at the actions of 2012 General Conference, and the Arkansas Annual Conference voted to encourage respect for multiple perspectives on human sexuality. The Detroit, Upper New York, and Wisconsin Conferences also supported resolutions supporting allowing same-gender marriages. Bishop Christian Alsted of the Nordic and Baltic Episcopal Area shared that some of the conferences within his region support same-sex marriage. Within the jurisdictions, the Western Jurisdiction and the North Central Jurisdiction have nominated three openly gay candidates for bishop. The Northeastern Jurisdiction passed a resolution supporting same-sex marriage and the ordination of openly gay and lesbian clergy, with the New York body ordaining the first openly gay and lesbian clergy in the denomination. In 2016, the Baltimore-Washington Conference appointed an openly partnered lesbian to the provisional diaconate. In April 2016, Bishop Melvin Talbert performed a same-sex marriage as a public sign of his support for change and full inclusion of LGBT persons. The church also provides spousal benefits for non-ordained employees in same-sex marriages. Some congregations have individually voted to perform same-sex marriages. Also in 2016, the Western Jurisdiction of the denomination elected an openly partnered lesbian as bishop.

However, two United Methodist bishops "voided two resolutions in the Northeastern United States that called for defying church restrictions". Similarly, the United Methodist Bishops of the Central Conferences of Africa unanimously called for "unreserved commitment to the Holy Bible as the primary authority for faith and practice in the Church" and proclaimed that "sexual relations are affirmed only within the covenant bond of a faithful monogamous, heterosexual marriage, and not within same-sex unions or polygamy". United Methodist Bishop Gaspar João Domingos stated that "the United Methodist Church denies the abuse of the principle of tolerance that sets aside the authority of Jesus Christ and the teaching on sexuality." At the same time, the Alabama-West Florida Conference" passed resolutions upholding the denomination's rules on homosexuality" and the Eastern Pennsylvania Conference "approved a resolution that urges the conference to demand clergy accountability to the Discipline's 'rules of our common covenant,' and to call upon clergy to challenge those rules only 'through legitimate channels of holy conferencing, rather than breaking that covenant.'" The Southeastern Jurisdiction also voted to maintain the current language in the Book of Discipline.

The official website of the United Methodist Church reported that "Retired United Methodist Bishop Melvin Talbert, for the second time, has defied church law to officiate at a ceremony celebrating the union of two men." One Annual Conference of the United Methodist Church, the New York Annual Conference, voiced disagreement with the denomination's official stance on homosexuality and "announced it would not consider sexual orientation in evaluating a clergy candidate." Additionally, the Northeastern Jurisdiction passed a resolution calling for change to The Book of Discipline.

On July 15, 2016, the Western Jurisdictional Conference elected Karen Oliveto to become the first openly lesbian Bishop in the United Methodist Church. She was consecrated as Bishop on July 16. She previously served as Pastor at Glide Memorial Church, was an ordained elder, taught students at the Pacific School of Religion, and was on the advisory board of the Forum for Theological Education. Bishop Oliveto is married to Robin Ridenour, a Deaconess in the California-Nevada Conference. However, on 25 April 2017, "In a 6-to-3 vote, the United Methodist Church’s highest court ruled that a married lesbian bishop, and those who consecrated her, had violated church law on marriage and homosexuality"; the United Methodist Church held that she "is in violation of a church law barring the ordination of 'self-avowed practicing homosexuals,' but it did not remove her as bishop, instead sending the issue back to the jurisdiction that chose her." Therefore, the Judicial Council ruled that "Bishop Oliveto 'remains in good standing,' until an administrative or judicial process is completed." However, the Judicial Council also ruled that "she was in good standing" and that "it had no jurisdiction to review Bishop Oliveto's nomination, election, and assignment." Also in 2016, a complaint filed against an openly gay minister was dismissed, and the minister was able to continue working.

On May 7, 2018, the Council of Bishops in the United Methodist Church proposed allowing individual pastors and regional church bodies to decide whether to ordain LGBT clergy and perform same-sex weddings, though this proposal can only be approved by the General Conference. At this meeting, the Council of Bishops will also consider two other alternative plans for the future concerning this issue. The second plan called the Connectional Conference Plan would create three connectional conferences based on theology related to the issue of human sexuality, the current five conferences would be abolished and each of the five conferences would have clearly defined values of accountability, contextualization, and justice. These three denominations would serve almost as three sub-denominations within overall United Methodism. The third plan, called the Traditional Plan, would reinforce the existing language in the Book of Discipline prohibiting homosexuality, gay marriage ceremonies on church campuses, and allow for stricter enforcement of violations of existing church law. On February 26, 2019, during a special session of the General Conference, delegates from around the world voted to pass the Traditional Plan.

In March 2019, the German Central Conference announced that it would not be implementing the Traditional Plan. Although the US jurisdictions and annual conferences are unable to alter the Book of Discipline as the Central Conferences are, the Western Jurisdiction declared their disagreement with the Traditional Plan and vowed to remain LGBTQ inclusive.

In September 2019, First United Methodist Church Moheto in Kenya became the first United Methodist Church in Africa to officially align itself with the Reconciling Ministries Network, which advocates for LGBTQIA+ inclusion in the church.

==== 2020s ====
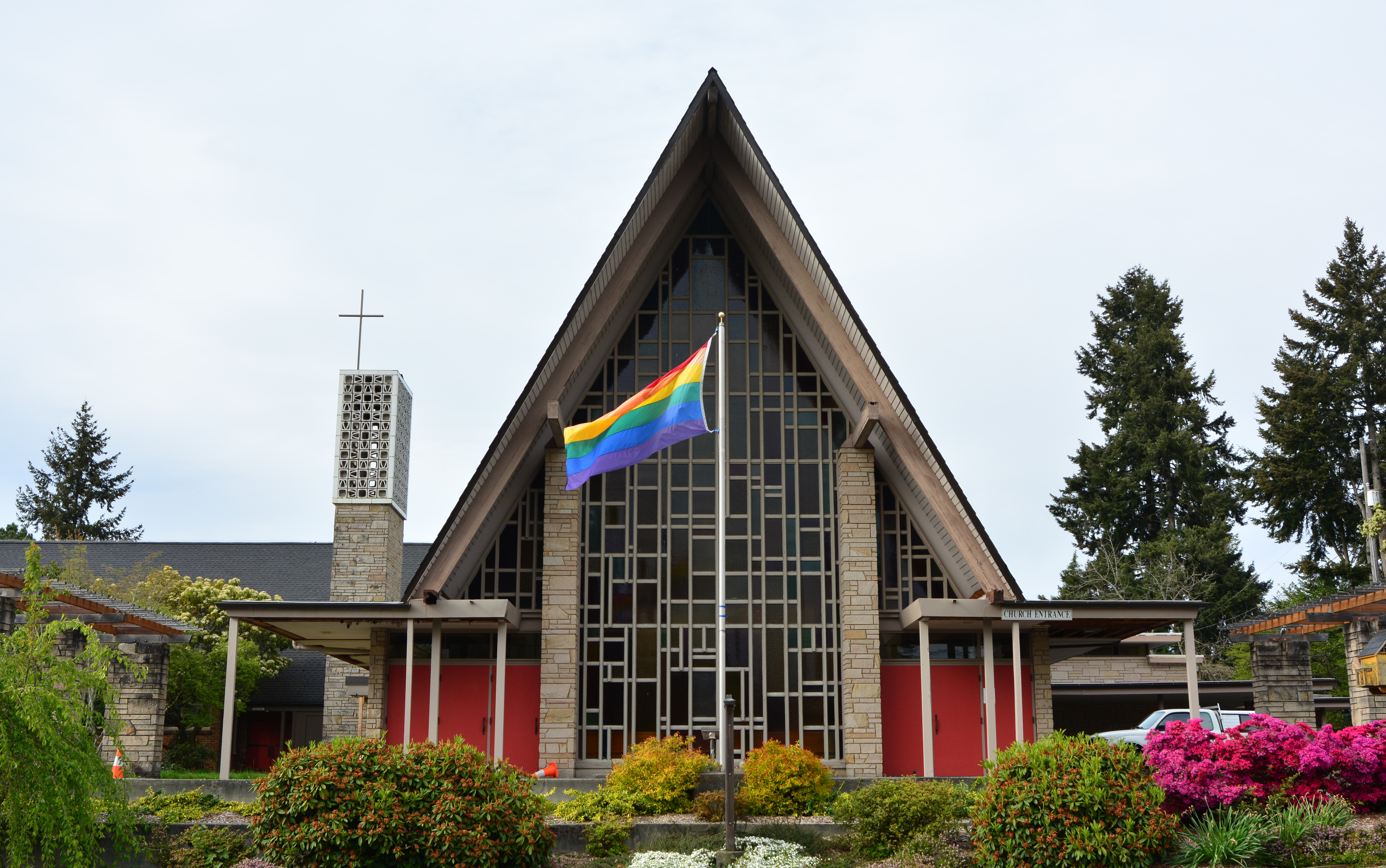
Sand Point Community United Methodist Church in Seattle flies a pride flag, April 2014.

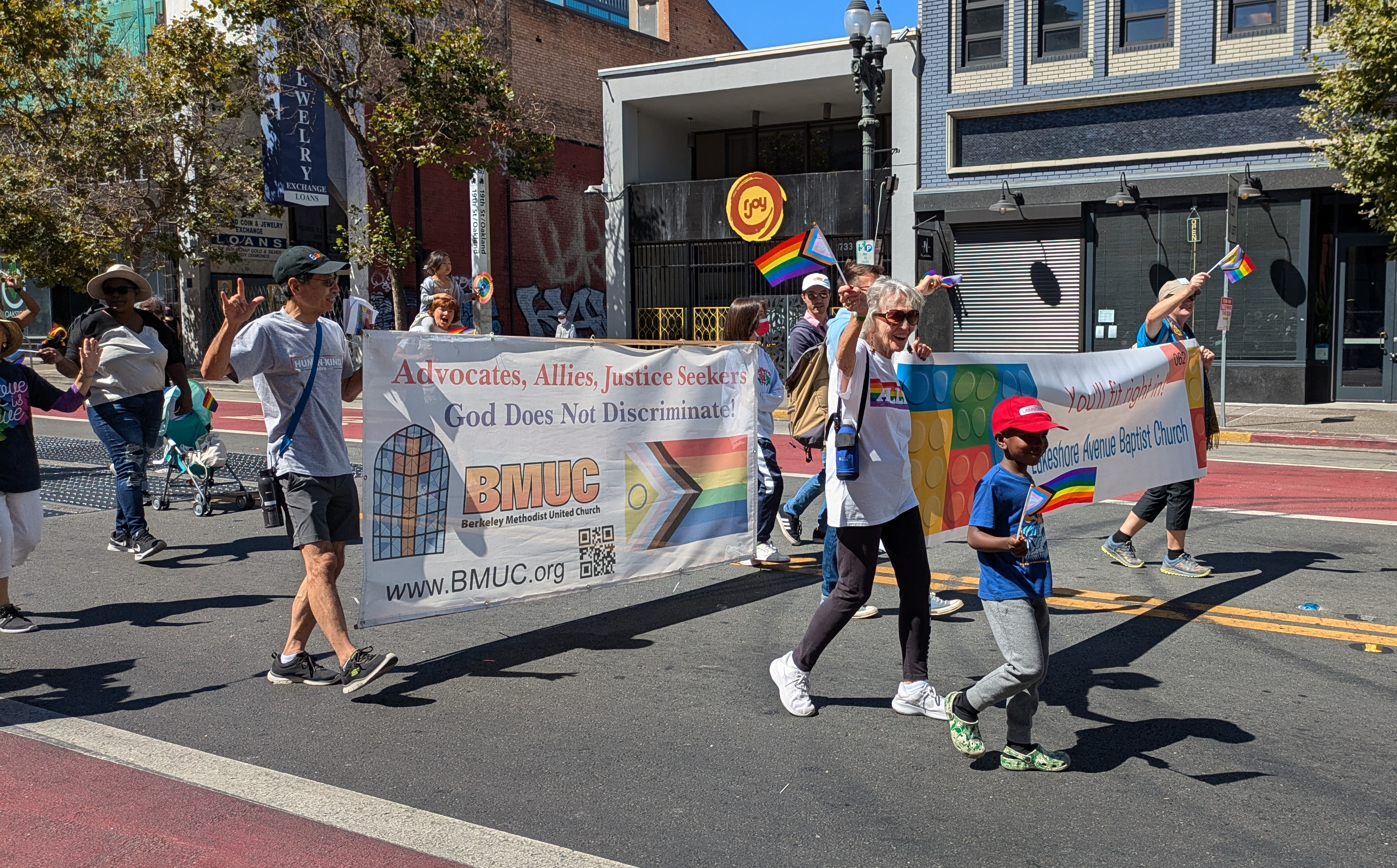
Berkeley Methodist United Church represented at a pride parade in Oakland, California, United States

In January 2020, a 16-person committee of bishops and other official submitted to the General Conference a schism proposal, titled “Protocol of Reconciliation and Grace through Separation,” for the creation of a new separated "traditional Methodist" denomination, a text that needed to be approved by the scheduled conference in May; the traditionalist connexion is the Global Methodist Church. By default, any parish will be set as a member of the United Methodist Church (UMC) and would have to conduct votes in order to enter in the newborn communion of the more conservative Methodists. The May vote to split the UMC was delayed due to the COVID-19 pandemic. Progressives too announced the creation of a new denomination in November 2020, the Liberation Methodist Connexion. The Protocol of Reconciliation and Grace by Separation was never actually approved, but in 2019, disaffiliation legislation was approved, which enabled conservative congregations to voluntarily leave to form the Global Methodist Church, which was exercised in part due to delays of the COVID-19 pandemic. After the departure, the progressives and centrists on the team that negotiated the Protocol withdrew support for the Protocol as it no longer reflected the changed denominational reality. In 2022, the Western Jurisdiction elected Cedrick Bridgeforth as a bishop, making him the second openly gay bishop elected in the Jurisdiction and the denomination.

During the 2024 General Conference, on April 25, 2024, the delegates passed a proposal to restructure the UMC, establishing regionalization that would allow each region to determine its own standards for same-sex marriage and the ordination of partnered LGBTQ clergy. Due to the proposal being a constitutional change, the proposal will need to be ratified by a two-thirds majority of votes cast during the local Annual Conferences. In 2025, Worldwide Regionalization was ratified, renaming former Central Conferences to Regional Conferences and creating a US Regional Conference granting equal autonomy between Regions around the world, decolonizing the United Methodist Church. Multiple petitions were brought to amend statutory language regarding sexuality. On April 30, 2024, the UMC removed penalties for clergy performing same-sex marriages, removed the ban on funding for LGBTQ-affirming organizations, and removed the prohibition on considering openly LGBTQ candidates for ordained ministry. On May 1, 2024, the General Conference of the UMC voted to repeal the prior prohibitions against clergy performing same-sex marriages and the ordination of openly partnered LGBTQ people or "self-avowed practicing homosexuals" as clergy. The vote also forbade superintendents from forbidding or requiring a church for same-sex weddings. On May 2, the General Conference voted to approve more petitions, which amended the UMC Social Principles to remove language stating that "the practice of homosexuality ... is incompatible with Christian teaching"; revises the language on marriage to state that it is "a sacred lifelong covenant that brings two people of faith [adult man and woman of consenting age or two adult persons of consenting age] into union with one another and into deeper relationship with God and the religious community;” states opposition to both child marriage and polygamy; and affirms support for consent in sexual relations. On May 3, during the final day of business, the General Conference removed language from church law imposing potential penalties for officiating at same-sex weddings, penalties for being in a same-sex relationship themselves, prohibitions against clergy from officiating or churches hosting same-sex weddings, and mandates that clergy practice celibacy in singleness. In addition, the General Conference added language allowing clergy to abstain from officiating any weddings. The Conference maintained the chargeable offense of "immorality" but voted against defining the offense to include infidelity or non-celibacy. A statement titled the "Message from African Delegates" lambasted the 2024 General Conference changes, opining that the United Methodist Church "now defines marriage differently from what God created it to be in the beginning" and "changed the definition of marriage from how Jesus described it in Matthew 19 as one man and one woman". It additionally stated that over 70 United Methodist delegates from the African continent were unable to attend due to visa issues and despite their correspondence, they did not receive a reply from the United Methodist offices in the United States. The "Message from African Delegates" declared that "We do not accept a change in the definition of marriage, and we will never accept marriage as anything other than one man and one woman, no matter what the Book of Discipline says."

The General Conference voted to enter into full communion with the Episcopal Church, effective upon mutual approval by the Episcopal Church's General Convention; the Episcopal Church approved ordination of openly-gay clergy in 2015, and allowed all clergy to voluntarily marry same-sex couples by 2018.

At the 2024 General Conference, a Constitutional Amendment was passed adding gender and ability to the membership nondiscrimination statement and was ratified in 2025 by the worldwide church, reading “All persons, without regard to race, gender, ability, color, national origin, status, or economic condition, shall be eligible to attend its worship services, participate in its programs, receive the sacraments, upon baptism be admitted as baptized members, and upon taking vows declaring the Christian faith, become professing members in any local church in the connection.”

=== Uniting Church in Australia ===
The Uniting Church in Australia (which includes Methodists) has permitted presbyteries to ordain openly gay and lesbian ministers if they opt to do so and churches may bless same-sex couples entering into civil partnerships. On 13 July 2018, the church's assembly voted by national Assembly to approve the creation of official marriage rites for same-sex couples.

== LGBT Methodists ==
- Paul Abels
- Cedrick Bridgeforth
- Gene Leggett
- Karen Oliveto
- Julian Rush
- Kristin Stoneking
- Deen Thompson

== See also ==
- List of Christian denominational positions on homosexuality
