= Russell Schulz-Widmar =

American composer (born 1944)

Russell Schulz-Widmar (born Russell E. Schulz; 29 July 1944) is a composer, author, and conductor, and a former Professor of Liturgical Music at the Seminary of the Southwest in Austin, Texas. For much of his career he lived in Austin, Texas and upon retirement he has divided his time between Berlin, Germany and Dallas, Texas. He is married to Hubertus Schulz-Wilke.

== Biography ==
Born into a family of German and Dutch immigrants, Russell Schulz grew up northwest of Chicago, near the village of Hebron, Illinois. He graduated with honors with a B. Mus. from Valparaiso University in Valparaiso, Indiana. He received his M. Mus. from the School of Music at Union Theological Seminary in New York City, and his D.M.A from The University of Texas at Austin. He also studied at the Royal School of Church Music in London/Croydon. In 1988 he was named a Distinguished Alumnus of Valparaiso University. In 2012 The Seminary of the Southwest awarded him the honorary degree Doctor of Humane Letters.

In 1971, while he was a student at The University of Texas, he and his wife Suzanne Widmar took over as co-Directors of Music at University United Methodist Church in Austin, Texas. In 1993, Schulz left University United Methodist Church to take a position as the Director of Music at the Episcopal Church of the Good Shepherd in Austin, Texas. He remained in the position until July, 2008.

In 1974 he became Organist/Choirmaster at the Episcopal Theological Seminary of the Southwest (now The Seminary of the Southwest) and later became Professor of Liturgical Music there. From 1975 to 1985 he was also Visiting Lecturer at the Austin Presbyterian Theological Seminary. From 1978 to 1985 he was a member of the Standing Commission on Church Music of the Episcopal Church, served on the Executive Editorial Board of that commission, and chaired the hymn music committee of the Hymnal 1982. In 1979, 1981, and 1983, on behalf of the Standing Commission and funded by the Lilly Foundation, he arranged biennial conferences for music professors/directors of music at the 10 US Episcopal Seminaries. From 1999 to 2001 he was a member of the Task Force for founding of the Armstrong Community Music School of the Austin Lyric Opera. Also at ALO, he served many years on the Triangle-on-Stage Committee. He was founding President of the Austin Boys' Choir and was a member of the founding Board of Directors of Conspirare: Craig Hella Johnson and Company of Voices. He was a member of the Board of Directors of the Capital City Men's Chorus and also the Austin Choral Union. He served on the faculty of the Evergreen Conference in Evergreen, CO, and then from 1980 to 1987 he was Dean of that conference. He served on the Editorial Advisory Board of the Hymn Society in the United States and Canada, and from 1987 to 1989 he was President of the Society. At the University of Texas he served on doctoral committees, served as faculty at conferences, lectured periodically at the School of Architecture, served on CAPO (Committee for the Advocacy of Pipe Organs) and also on the Advisory Board of the Center for Sacred Music.

He has had a lifelong interest in ethnomusicology, particularly in the study of music as a lens into a culture. He interviewed and photographed hundreds of people in such diverse cultures as the former East Germany, Germany, Poland, Latvia, Lithuania, Estonia, Belarus, Russia, Egypt, Kenya, India, Australia, the UK, Mexico, Brazil and Chile.

== Selected publications ==
=== As Editor or Chair ===
The Book of Canticles
El Himnario Provisional
The Hymnal 1982 - The current hymnal in use by the Episcopal Church of the United States of America
Hymnal Supplement II
Hymns III
A New Hymnal for Colleges and Schools - A progressive, non-denominational hymnal by Yale University Press
Praises Abound - a collection of meditations based on hymns and original hymns by students at the Seminary of the Southwest, Austin
Shepherd Songs - A collection of thirteen new hymns, commissioned by members and friends of the Episcopal Church of the Good Shepherd, Austin.
Songs of Thanks and Praise - A nondenominational hymnal supplement

=== As composer: representative works ===
==== Choral works ====
"Adam Lay Ybounden"
An Advent Processional
Autumn Carol
"Bethlehem"
"Boundless Love"
"By Gracious Powers"
A Carol for Christmas
"Forth in Thy Name"
"Give Rest, O Christ"
"God Remembers"
Good Friday Anthems
Heavenly Dance
"Here, O My Lord"
"How Can I Keep from Singing"
"How Clear Is Our Vocation, Lord"
"I Am Resurrection"
"I Heard the Voice of Jesus Say"
"I Saw Three Ships"
"In Remembrance" (1990)
"In the Bleak Mid-winter"
"Infant Holy"
"Jerusalem, Jerusalem"
"Jerusalem, My Happy Home"
"Jesus, Jesus, Rest Your Head"
Joseph's Lullaby
"Lord, Enthroned in Heavenly Splendor"
Lullaby
"Mary Said Yes"
"Midnight Clear"
Miriam Dances at the Red Sea
A Neo-gothic Carol: "Ave Mary"
A Neo-gothic Carol: "To Us this Morn"
"O God of Gentle Strength"
"O Gracious Light" (after Arnatt)
"O Gracious Light"
"The Peace of God"
"Remember Christmas"
"Rest In Peace:" A Song of Farewell
Resurrection Dance
"The Royal Banners of Our King"
Sanctus/Picardy
Sky Song
Song of Mary: Magnificat
Song of Simeon: Nunc Dimittis
Song of the Advents
"Songs of Sovereign Grace"
"The Sons of Asaph"
Spring Carol
Stille Nacht
Summer Carol
"Sweet Music"
"Sweet Spirit, Comfort Me"
"There Is a Happy Land"
"This Is the Feast of Victory for Our God"
Three French Carols
"Through all the Changing Scenes of Life"
"Unto Us Is Born a Child"
Visitation Carol
Volemus Pastorcitos
"We Are Not Our Own"
"We Come, O Christ"
"When In Our Music God Is Glorified"
"Wonder, Love, and Praise"
"Your Love, O Christ"

==== Large works ====
St. Andrews Evensong
St. Andrews Mass
Mass of the Good Shepherd
Stabat Mater, for choir and orchestra
Requiem, for choir and soloists with organ and six instruments

==== Solo vocal works ====
"How Can I Keep from Singing?"
"Now the Green Blade Riseth"
"What Child Is This?"

==== Organ works ====
Adeste fideles
Adoro te devote
Ar Hyd y Nos
Beach Spring
Conditor alme siderum
Dialog
Duet and Trio on 'Hyfrydol'
Easter Hymn
Elegy on Old Hundredth
Fantasia on the Danish Amen
Grosser Gott/Te Deum
Hyfrydol
Intonation on 'All Glory, Laud and Honor'
Introduction and Varied Harmonizations of 'Easter Hymn'
Ite missa est
Jesu dulcis memoria
Land of Rest
Lasst uns erfreuen
Lord Have Mercy (from Danish Amen Mass)
Lourdes Hymn
A Mighty Fortress is Our God
Organ Mass: 'Lord, have mercy'
Organ Mass: 'Holy, holy, holy Lord"
Partita on 'Ah, Holy Jesus'
Picardy
Prelude on an Ancient Melody
Prelude on 'Lasst uns erfreuen'
Prelude on 'Middlebury'
Procession
Procession for the Ascension Vigil
Quite Alleluias
Requiem aeternam
Sicilian Mariners
Simple Gifts
St. Catherine
St. Flavian
Stille Nacht
Sussex Carol
Sweet Sacrament
Tantum ergo/Pange lingua
Triptych on Veni Creator Spiritus
Ubi caritas
Variations on 'O Come All Ye Faithful'
Variants on 'St. Columbia'
Variants on 'Let All Mortal Flesh Keep Silence'
Veni Creator
Veni Creator Spiritus
Veni, veni Emmanuel
Victimae paschali laudes
We Gather Together
When Jesus Wept
Wie Schön Leuchtet
Wondrous Love

==== Hymn texts ====
"We Are Gathered All Together"
"You, Lord, We Praise in Songs of Celebration"
"Your Love, O God, Has Called Us Here"

==== Hymn tunes ====
Anna Marie
Bordy
DeVries
Kelfer
Moehr
Molly
Sanjeev
Wilke
Wilmersdorf
plus dozens of harmonizations

==== Unpublished works ====
The Journey (SATB version)
Requiem (version with full orchestra, 1998)
Songs from Buckeye Trail

==== Some writing ====
Forewords, for four hymn collections: Patricia Clark, Thomas Pavlechko, Richard Proulx, K. Lee Scott
Reviews of books by Richard Arnold, Fred Pratt Green, Marion J. Hatchett, Robin Leaver, Alan Luff, Cyril Taylor, and Arthur Wenk.
Hymnal 1982 Companion: "Hymnody in the US since 1950" plus many short articles
Duty and Delight - Routley Remembered: "The Hymn Renaissance in the US"
In The Hymn, July 1982: "American Hymnody: A View of the Current Scene"

==== Some Presentations on US Hymnody and Church Music ====
All Saints Episcopal Church, Austin: Bailey Lectures
Colorado State University, Ft. Collins
Concordia University, River Forest, IL
Saint Mary's University, San Antonio
Seminary of the Southwest: Harvey Lectures
Schmelztiegel der Traditionen / Melting-pot of Traditions, von Arne Reuel, Deutschland Radio Kultur
Texas Lutheran University, Seguin
University of Texas
Valparaiso University
Westminster Abbey, London
Westminster Choir College, Princeton. NJ
Yale University Divinity School, New Haven, CT
Hymn Society Conferences: Bethlehemn PA; Charleston, SC; Ft. Worth, TX: Louven, Belgium; Oberlin, OH; Washington, DC

==== Major works conducted ====
Bach: Brandenburgs, cantatas, Magnificat
Brahms: Requiem
Duruflé: Requiem
Fauré: Requiem
Peter Hallock: Phoenix
Handel: Chandos Anthems, Israel in Egypt, Jubliate Deo, Messiah, organ concerti
Haydn: Creation, Little Organ Mass, Lord Nelson Mass, St Nicholas Mass
Mendelssohn: Elijah, St. Paul
Mozart: Requiem, church sonatas, Colloredo Mass, Coronation Mass, Sparrow Mass, Missa brevis in F
Perry: Judith (with added texts by Fred Pratt Green)
Proulx: Acclamations, Mass for the City
Rutter: Requiem
Schubert: Deutsche Messe, Mass in G
Schulz-Widmar: Requiem, Service for the Seminary of the Southwest, Stabat Mater
Vaughan Williams: Dona Nobis Pacem
Vivaldi: Gloria

==== Other performances ====
Rites in Ragtime: Music of Scott Joplin as Religious Expression
Voice and Verse: Combining Handel's Messiah and Bunyan's Pilgrim's Progress
Dietrich Bonhoeffer: A Music Festival
American Songs of Praise: 1976
A Festival of Fred Pratt Green
