= Gene Leggett =

American Methodist minister

The Reverend Gene Leggett
- Born: Franklin Gene Leggett; March 19, 1935; Edinburg, Texas, US
- Died: December 31, 1987 (aged 52); Dallas, Texas, US
- Education: Pan American College; Southern Methodist University
- Years active: 1961–1987
- Religion: Christianity (Methodist)
- Church: Methodist Church (bef. 1968); United Methodist Church (aft. 1968)
- Ordained: 1961
- Congregations served: Travis Park Church, San Antonio; University United Methodist Church

Franklin Gene Leggett (March 19, 1935 – December 31, 1987) was an American Methodist minister who was the first gay minister to be defrocked by the United Methodist Church for being homosexual, in 1971.

== Early life and family ==
Franklin Gene Leggett was born on March 19, 1935, in Edinburg, Texas. He had three sons with his wife, Fanny.

Leggett was raised Methodist and participated in Methodist Sunday school and Methodist Youth Fellowship.

== Disciplinary actions regarding homosexuality ==
In 1965 a parishioner suspected that Leggett was homosexual and hired a private investigator. The parishioner notified the church office and Leggett was confronted with the investigation's results. He was given the option of resigning from his current position and finding a job outside of a parish for the issue to be dropped. As Leggett at that time was not openly gay, he accepted the offer.

Leggett came out as homosexual publicly with a letter to his friends and family in 1971. A month later from his coming out letter he was suspended by the Southwest Texas Conference by a vote of 144 to 117. The Gay Liberation Front confronted the church delegates and demanded that the church "cease the harassment" of Gene Leggett. After his suspension, Leggett said that he wanted to "continue the ministry as a Christian and, hopefully, as a Methodist." Later in 1974 the church allowed Leggett to appeal his suspension; however, his appeal was denied.

== 1972 General Conference ==
In 1972 the United Methodist Church continued to develop the Book of Discipline and adopted a statement on sexual morality. The statement as drafted and proposed read:

"Homosexuals no less than heterosexuals are person [sic] of sacred worth, who need the ministry and guidance of the church in their struggles for human fulfillment, as well as the spiritual and emotional care of a fellowship which enables reconciling relationships with God, with others, and with self. Further we insist that all persons are entitled to have their human and civil rights ensured."

At this point Leggett had already been defrocked; however, there was no justifiable reason for his relocation as there was no rule in the Book of Discipline that prevented homosexuals from being clergy. This statement was struggling to pass so Don Hand, a delegate from South Texas, suggested that the period be replaced with a comma with the addition of "although we do not condone the practice of homosexuality and consider this practice incompatible with Christian teaching" added to the end. This is known as the Hand Amendment and later the Incompatibility Clause.

Leggett was to give a speech before the Hand Amendment was voted on; however, church officials prevented him from speaking. This speech can be found in the LGBTQ Religious Archives.

== Ministries ==
Leggett founded and participated in the United Methodist Gay Caucus, which later became known as Affirmation.

He led a house called "House of the Covenant" for people whom he felt the church had not reached. This was a ministry for homosexuals in Dallas.

He was a lay-leader and member of St. Stephen's United Methodist Church after he was defrocked. At St. Stephen's, he taught children's Sunday school classes, classes for adults, and served on church committees.

== Activism ==
To protest his defrocking, Leggett along with some of his friends during the ordination ceremonies at the Southwest Texas Annual Conference would stand gagged with his liturgical stole around his hands and mouth. He also organized a similar protest at the Minnesota Annual Conference when Rick Huskey was defrocked in 1977.

Leggett and Rick Huskey met at the 1972 United Methodist General Conference in Atlanta. In 1973, the two traveled along the east coast speaking with gay and lesbian United Methodists. They led the first national meeting of the United Methodist Gay Caucus in 1975.

== Death ==
Leggett died on December 31, 1987, at Dallas, Texas, at the age of 52, from hepatitis.

== See also ==
- Paul Abels
- Homosexuality and Methodism
- Karen Oliveto
- Julian Rush
