= Albert Mollegen =

American minister and author

Albert Theodore Mollegen, Sr.
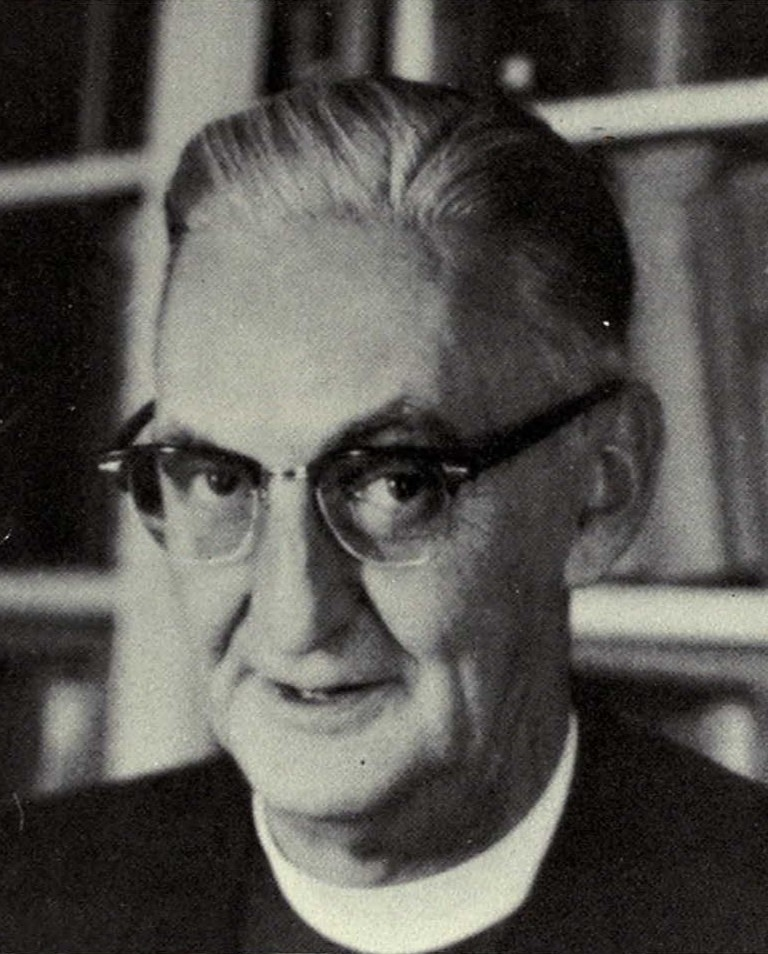
- Dr. Albert T. Mollegen in the 1960s.
- Born: February 17, 1906; McComb, Mississippi, U.S.
- Died: January 22, 1984 (aged 77)
- Notable work: Christianity and Modern Man (1961)
- Family: Ted Mollegen (son); Anne Mollegen Smith (daughter)

Albert Theodore Mollegen Sr. (February 17, 1906 – January 22, 1984) was a widely-known apologist for classical Christianity and a proponent of evangelical liberalism.

== Birth and early years ==
Mollegen was born in McComb, Mississippi to Charles Henry Mollegen (1880–1912) and Bessie Lee McDonald (1882–1969). His father died when he was very young.

He studied at Mississippi Agricultural & Mechanical College (now Mississippi State University) before graduating from Virginia Theological Seminary in Alexandria. Graduate coursework was completed in New York City. He earned a master's degree at Union Theological Seminary and a doctorate at the General Theological Seminary.

At Union, Mollegen was one of the first American students of the religious socialist Paul Tillich. He later became one of Tillich's most articulate adherents.

== Career ==
Mollegen taught New Testament language and literature and Christian ethics at the Virginia Theological Seminary for most of his career. He also lectured at many campuses including the University of Chicago, University of Florida, Trinity College in Hartford, Connecticut, Southern Methodist University, and Cambridge University.

In 1947, he founded Christianity and Modern Man, a liberal evangelical organization.

Throughout his career, Mollegen was invited to preach at various churches throughout the United States. Mollegen strongly believed that the revival of Christian religion clearly rests on the individual having a closer connection to God, and not the clergy.

He retired from the faculty of the Virginia Theological Seminary in 1974.

== Personal life ==
His wife, the former Harriette Ione Rush of Meridian, Mississippi, died in 1978. He has a son, A.T. Mollegen Jr. (known as Ted) of Mystic, Conn.; a daughter, Anne Mollegen Smith of New York City, and three grandchildren.

== Works ==
=== Books ===
- Mollegen, Albert T., The faith of Christians (1954)
- Mollegen, Albert T., The Christianity of St. Paul (1956)
- Mollegen, Albert T., Christianity and modern man; the crisis of secularism (The Bobbs-Merrill Company, Indianapolis, Indiana, 1961).

=== Articles ===
- Mollegen, Albert T. (1952). "The Religious Basis of Western Socialism". In Egbert, Donald Drew; Persons, Stow (eds.). Socialism and American Life. Vol. 1. Princeton, New Jersey: Princeton University Press (published 2016). pp. 97–124. ISBN 978-1-4008-7508-5. JSTOR j.ctt183pqkf.7.
- Mollegen, Albert T., and Charles P. Price, Existentialism: question or answer? (1961)

== See also ==
- Christian apologetics
