= Karen Oliveto =

American bishop (born 1958)

- Resident Bishop, Mountain Sky Episcopal Area
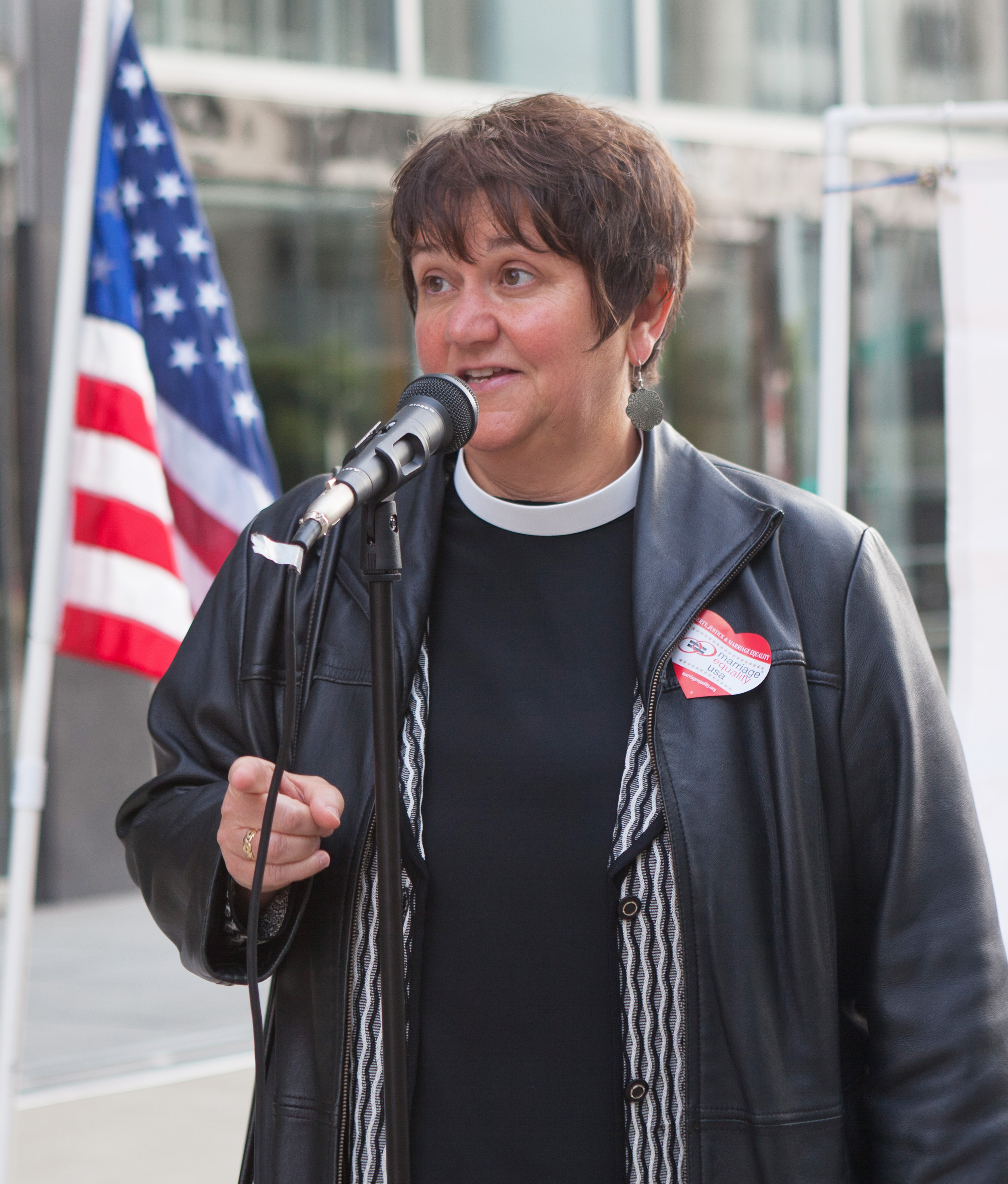
- Oliveto in 2011
- Church: United Methodist Church
- Diocese: Mountain Sky Annual Conference (after the 2018 merger of the former Yellowstone Annual Conference and Rocky Mountain Annual Conference)
- In office: July 1, 2016 – present
- Previous posts: Senior Pastor, Glide Memorial UMC

Orders
- Ordination: 1983
- Consecration: 2016

Personal details
- Spouse: Robin Ridenour (m. 2014)

Karen Oliveto (born April 4, 1958) is an American bishop. She is the first openly lesbian bishop to be elected in the United Methodist Church. She was elected bishop on July 15, 2016, at the Western Jurisdictional conference. Her four-year term of service began September 1, 2016 and she currently serves as the bishop of the UMC's Mountain Sky Conference (created in 2018 when the UMC's Rocky Mountain and Yellowstone Conferences merged during Oliveto's tenure as bishop in both conferences); she was officially installed on September 24. At the time of her election, she was the senior pastor of Glide Memorial Church in San Francisco. Oliveto is married to Robin Ridenour, who is a deaconess in the United Methodist Church's California-Nevada Conference.

== Biography ==
Originally from Long Island, New York, she was born on April 4, 1958, and raised in West Babylon, which is on the south shore of Long Island. She grew up in the Babylon United Methodist Church (New York) and had her call to ministry at the age of 11. She preached her first sermon at 16 and began working as a student pastor when she was 18.

In the early 1980s, she was inspired by Julian Rush, a youth minister based in Colorado, who made national headlines, when Bishop Melvin E. Wheatley of the Rocky Mountain Conference (a predecessor of the Mountain Sky Conference), appointed him to St. Paul Methodist Church in Denver as an openly gay man.

"Without someone like Julian," Bishop Oliveto said at the time of his death in 2023, "I would have lived in despair, totally wondering how can I rectify that the God who made me called me into this, but the church doesn’t want me and I think my life would have been much different."

She has served parish and campus ministries in rural and urban settings in both New York and California. In 2004, she performed the first legal same-gender marriage held in a United Methodist Church during SF’s “Winter of Love”. She has served as the associate dean of academic affairs at Pacific School of Religion in Berkeley, where she also taught United Methodist history, doctrine, polity, and evangelism as an adjunct professor for 12 years.

She was the senior pastor of the 12,000 member Glide Memorial UMC for eight years, becoming the first woman to lead one of the UMC's 100 largest membership churches.

=== Education ===
Oliveto is a graduate of Pacific School of Religion (M.Div., 1983) and Drew University, where she received a PhD in religion and society (2002) as well as a BA (cum laude) in psychology (1980) and a MPhil (1991). Her Ph.D. dissertation topic was: "Movements of Reform, Movements of Resistance: Homosexuality and The United Methodist Church. A Case Study".

=== Status as bishop ===
On April 28, 2017, the United Methodist Church's high court ruled 6-3 that while her lesbian status was in violation of the church's policies governed by the Book of Discipline, she could still retain her position as bishop and the church's Western Jurisdiction would handle the matter. The judicial council also ruled that it did not have jurisdiction to review her nomination, election, or assignment. Jeanne Audrey Powers had advocated for Oliveto's election.

=== Personal life ===
Oliveto is married to Robin Ridenour, who is a deaconess in the United Methodist Church. They met when volunteers at a junior high church camp. They began dating in 1999 and were married in 2014.

== Ordained ministry ==
Pastor, Bloomville UMC, Bloomville, New York 1983-1986

Campus Minister Ecumenical House Campus Ministry, San Francisco State, 1989-1992

Pastor Bethany UMC, San Francisco 1992-2004

Associate Dean of Academic Affairs/Director of Contextual Education, Pacific School of Religion, Berkeley, CA 2004-2008

Adjunct Professor of United Methodist Studies at Pacific School of Religion, 2004-2016

Adjunct Professor, DMin program at Drew University, teaching "Prophetic Leadership in Congregation and Community" 2012

Adjunct Professor of Practical Theology, Brite Divinity School (TX), teaching "Evangelism in Methodist History and Practice", 2015

Senior pastor. Glide Memorial Church, San Francisco. 2008-2016

Resident bishop of the Mountain Sky Area of The United Methodist Church, 2016–present

== See also ==
- Homosexuality and Methodism
- LGBT-affirming religious groups
- Julian Rush
- Gene Leggett
- Paul Abels
