= University United Methodist Church =

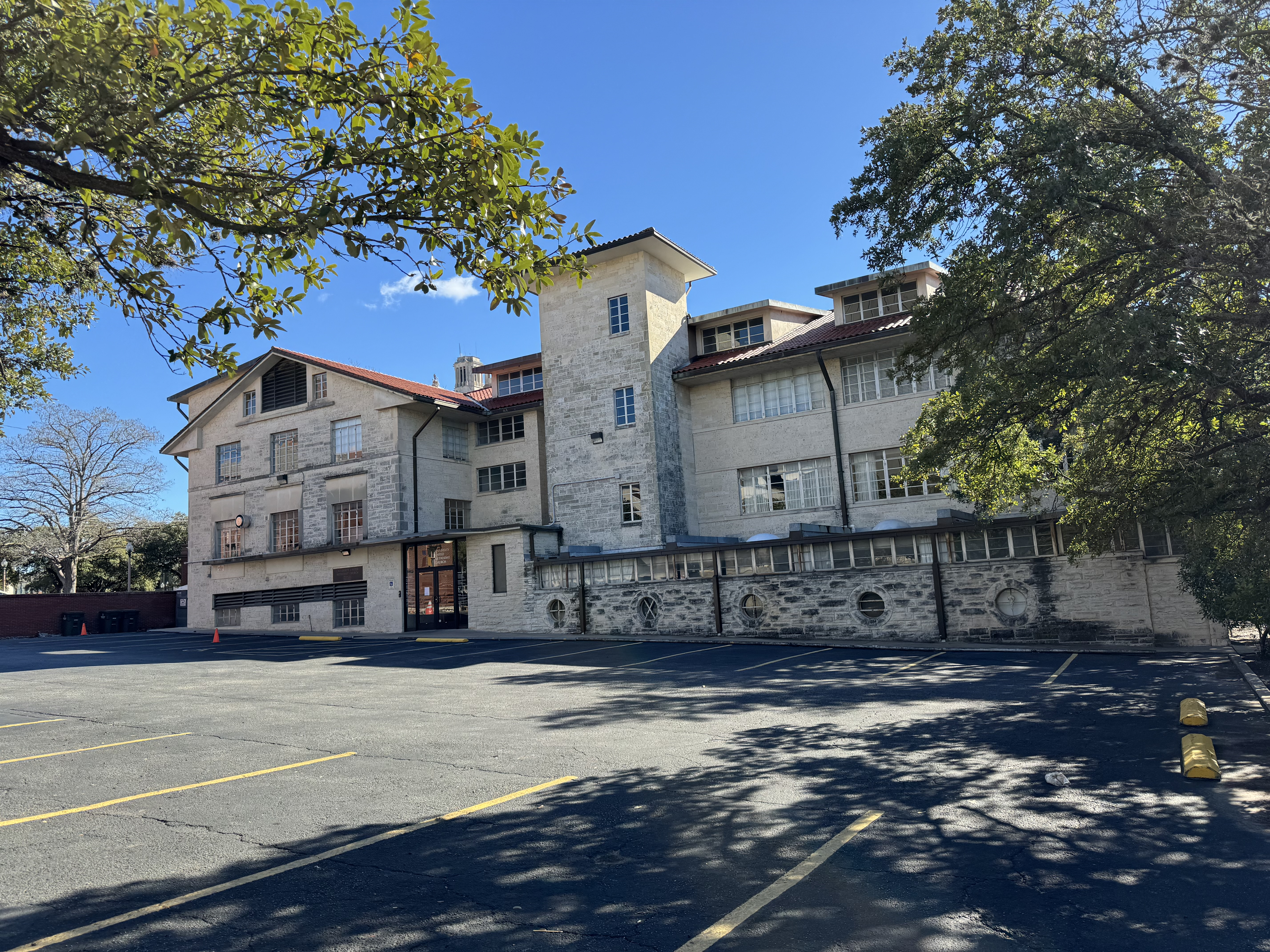
- University United Methodist Church
- 30.287953°N 97.741241°W
- Country: United States
- Denomination: United Methodist
- Website: www.uumc.org

History
- Former name: 24th Street Methodist Church
- Founded: 1887
- Founder: J. E. Stovall

University United Methodist Church, Austin, Texas, is a United Methodist Church belonging to the Rio Texas Conference of the United Methodist Church. Located at the corner of 24th Street and Guadalupe Street (known to locals as the "Drag"), UUMC has been a fixture near the University of Texas at Austin campus for more than 120 years.

== History ==
University United Methodist Church began its life in 1887 under the name Austin City Mission. The congregation met in a tiny building called Honey Chapel, which was located on the northeast corner of 24th Street and Whitis Avenue, one block east of the present location of the church. The first pastor was Rev. John E. Stovall, who served as pastor for one year.

In 1888, the church was renamed Twenty-Fourth Street Church, and the congregation continued to meet in the building known as Honey Chapel until 1891.

In 1891, a new brick building was built at the corner of 24th Street and Nueces, two blocks west of the church's present location. This new church continued to be called Twenty-Fourth Street Church until 1895, when it was renamed Hotchkiss Memorial Church. (Mr. and Mrs. W. H. Hotchkiss had been members of the church since the day of its first service in 1887.) The congregation remained Hotchkiss Memorial Church until 1905, when the name of the church was officially changed to University Methodist Church—even though services continued to be held in the Hotchkiss Memorial Church building until 1909.

In 1905, at the same time as the name change of the church, it was decided that the congregation would sell off the existing church building and property and invest the money in new property and a new building. The new property, on the Northeast corner of 24th Street and Guadalupe, was owned by an eccentric University of Texas math professor, who lived in a house built on stilts, and kept chickens under his house. The cornerstone for the new church was laid on October 8, 1907. Architect Frederick M. Mann designed the building, which was unlike any other in Austin at the time. The architectural style is considered to be Richardsonian Romanesque, similar to the style of buildings designed by noted architect Henry Hobson Richardson. The use of native limestone with a Mediterranean red-tile roof was unique in Austin at the time, although this style was soon adopted by The University of Texas as the central architectural style for most campus buildings built during the first half of the 20th century.

Work continued on the new church for nearly two years, with the congregation holding its first worship service in the new building on May 23, 1909.

A second building was added to the property in 1924. The Wesley Bible Chair building was constructed just north of the church, in the area now occupied by Heinsohn Hall. This new building housed all student activity at the church, as well as providing much-needed space for Sunday School classes and other meetings.

Also in 1924, the three-story rear section of the church was demolished and rebuilt, turning what had been Sunday School classrooms and offices into an expanded sanctuary and balcony space, leaving a few classroom spaces on either side. If you look at the exterior of the building, you can still see the third-floor windows underneath the eaves. While those windows once provided light to the classrooms on the third floor of the sanctuary, they are now only accessible from the attic above the barrel-vaulted section of the rear of the church.

The congregation purchased the property adjacent to the Wesley Bible Chair at some point before the 1940s, expanding the church's property to include the entire block between 24th and 25th Streets. An old bakery, along with several small buildings, were on that property, and those spaces were used for several years as meeting rooms for children's Sunday School, as well as Boy Scouts and other groups.

In 1949, the Wesley Bible Chair building was demolished, and a new education building was constructed. This four-story building, named Heinsohn Hall, still stands today, housing all offices for the church, along with a child care center, choir room, fellowship hall, chapel, library, kitchen and numerous Sunday School classrooms and meeting rooms.

A major renovation of the entire property was undertaken beginning in 1956, when the old bakery and other buildings on the corner of 25th Street were demolished to make room for a parking lot. During these renovations (known as "The Big Step" program), outdoor play areas attached to Heinsohn Hall's child care rooms were enclosed, and both Heinsohn Hall and the sanctuary building were air-conditioned. The exposed pipes in the sanctuary's pipe organ were covered with an organ screen, and the lantern or dome area in the ceiling of the sanctuary was closed off and turned into a fluorescent light fixture.

The name of the church changed again in 1968, when the Evangelical United Brethren Church joined with the Methodist Church (USA) to form The United Methodist Church. At that time, the official name of the church became University United Methodist Church.

The next major renovation to the church came in 1968-1969, when the original pipe organ was removed and a new Schantz pipe organ was installed. The new instrument was significantly larger than the original instrument, and the Schantz Organ Co. organ remains in place to this day.

The sanctuary was again renovated in 1978, when the chancel area and choir loft were expanded, and the dome was reopened to allow in natural light through the stained glass windows around its perimeter. Heinsohn Hall underwent a fairly large renovation in 1985 when an elevator tower was added to the building. Minor modifications were made to the sanctuary choir loft area in 1995, to accommodate a new Steinway grand piano.

In 2007, it was announced that a campaign would begin to raise money for a complete renovation of the now-100-year-old sanctuary building. This Capital Campaign was kicked off in early 2008, with the goal of raising $3 million for the first phase of the renovations. These renovations include a complete restoration/preservation of the stained glass windows, improving accessibility to the sanctuary for the mobility-impaired, and replacing the 100-year-old roof.

In 2014, a second phase of the renovation project was undertaken, which included replacement of the heating and air conditioning systems, and a complete renovation of the kitchen and all restrooms in both church buildings.

== God Is Here ==
In 1978, as part of the Festival of Worship, a new hymn was commissioned from renowned hymnwriter Fred Pratt Green. That hymn, "God Is Here", has since been published in many languages and in many different hymnals, including The United Methodist Hymnal, The Presbyterian Hymnal, Christian Worship: A Lutheran Hymnal, A New Hymnal for Colleges and Schools, among many others.

Former Director of Music Russell Schulz-Widmar, commenting on "God Is Here", said, "Certainly in the area of church music at UUMC, commissioning that hymn is one of the most important things we've done."

== Becoming a Reconciling Congregation ==
The congregation began exploring issues around the Reconciling Ministry movement for at least a decade before it formally voted to affiliate with the Reconciling Ministries Network (RMN) in 2011. The first steps were small groups like individual Sunday School classes and Home Room groups deciding to join RMN. At its August 2010 meeting, the Administrative Council created an Ad Hoc subcommittee to hold Reconciling Ministries church-wide events in the fall to inform and educate the congregation about RMN and what it would mean for our local congregation to join the network. Fall 2010 activities sponsored by the subcommittee included:

- A 7-week Sunday School class "Claiming the Promise" that explores the meaning of the four key Bible passages that allegedly condemn homosexuality;
- Creation of a Reconciling Ministries brochure that says, among other things, that UUMC's reconciling ministry will advocate for changing discriminatory language in the Book of Discipline ("homosexuality is incompatible with Christian teaching");
- A Retired Pastor's Roundtable to discuss GLBT issues they've encountered during their careers;
- Screening of "For the Bible Tells Me So";
- Professor L. Michael White lecture and discussion on the most misunderstood Bible passages related to homosexuality;
- Two open forums at church to discuss RMN.

On February 27, 2011, 93% of members attending a called Church Conference voted in favor of affiliating with RMN.

== The UUMC Choir ==
The earliest references to a choir in church publications date to the 1890s. For more than a century, UUMC has had a strong commitment to classical sacred music, led mainly by the UUMC Choir. Beginning in the early 1970s, the music ministry led by Directors of Music Russell Schulz-Widmar and Suzanne Schulz-Widmar built the UUMC Choir to a peak membership of around 75 members in the mid-1980s. In 1985, the UUMC Choir toured England, singing in such places as Westminster Abbey, Coventry Cathedral, Norwich Cathedral, and the Washington National Cathedral. This choral music ministry has continued to this day. Marc Erck was Director of Music and Worship from 1993 to 2014. Jolene Webster led the music ministry as Director of Music Ministries from 2015 to 2021.

The UUMC Choir is known for performing large works of sacred choral literature. Some of these works include:

Johann Sebastian Bach: Magnificat
Benjamin Britten: A Ceremony of Carols
Benjamin Britten: Rejoice in the Lamb
Benjamin Britten: Saint Nicolas
Maurice Duruflé: Requiem
Gabriel Fauré: Requiem
Howard Goodall: Eternal Light - A Requiem
George Frideric Handel: Israel in Egypt
George Frideric Handel: Messiah
George Frideric Handel: Utrecht Jubilate
Joseph Haydn: Missa in Angustiis (Lord Nelson Mass)
Wolfgang Amadeus Mozart: "Great" Mass in C minor
Wolfgang Amadeus Mozart: Requiem
John Rutter: Requiem
John Rutter: Gloria
K. Lee Scott: Gloria (Commissioned by UUMC in 2009)

== University United Methodist Church Pastors ==
=== Senior Pastors ===
==== Austin City Mission ====
John E. Stovall, 1887–1888

==== Twenty-Fourth Street Church ====
F. E. Hammond, 1888-1889
E. D. Mouzon, 1889-1890
F. E. Hammond, 1890-1891
Giles C. Rector, 1891-1893
S. W. Thomas, 1893-1895
Elijah L. Shettles, 1895–1896

==== Hotchkiss Memorial Church ====
E. S. Smith, 1896-1898
F. S. Jackson, 1898
Elijah L. Shettles, 1898-1899
Clyde B. Garrett, 1899-1901
D. Knox Porter, 1901–1905

==== University Methodist Church ====
New Harris, 1905-1906
Cullom H. Booth, 1906-1910
D. Emory Hawk, 1910-1912
Robert P. Shuler, 1912-1916
A. Frank Smith, 1916-1918
K. P. Barton, 1918-1924
T. F. Sessions, 1924-1926
H. Bascom Watts, 1926-1930
L. U. Spellman, 1930-1934
Edmund Heinsohn, 1934-1958
James William Morgan, 1958–1969

==== University United Methodist Church ====
William A. Holmes, 1969-1974
George M. Ricker, 1974-1985
J. Charles Merrill, 1985-2004
Carl W. Rohlfs, 2004-2010
Ann Brown Fields (interim pastor), 2010
John R. Elford, 2010-2021
Teresa Welborn, 2021-present

=== Associate and Assistant Pastors ===
H. M. Whalum, 1910-1912
Walter E. Kerr, 1943-1945
Calvin E. Freohner, 1945-1950
Robert E. Ledbetter, 1953-1954
Brady B. Tyson, 1954-1956
Gregory Robertson, 1956-1958
Jesse M. Mothersbaugh, 1958-1959
Jack Hooper, 1959-1963
Fred Kight, 1959-1963
H. Myron Braun, 1961-1968
F. Gene Leggett, 1963-1964
Albert B. Clayton, 1964-1967
Walter Pilgrim, 1965-1966
Norman D. Roe, 1966-1969
Gary W. Frederick, 1967-1972
Sanford Coon, 1969-1975
Janice R. Huie, 1973-1975
W. Grady Roe, 1975-1979
Robert E. Hall, 1976-1979
Laurita Nielsen, 1979
Gary Reuthinger, 1979
Roy C. Ricker, 1980-1988
Karen Vannoy Levbarg, 1986-1992
David J. Minnich, 1986-2000
Monte Marshall, 1990-1994
Kathryn Longley, 1992-1997
J. Richard Wilson, 1994-2003
Martine Stemerick, 1997-1998
Rosie L. Johnson, 1998-2005
Barrett Renfro, 2000-2008
Bill Frisbee, 2002–2014
Suzanne Field Rabb, 2006-2007
Darlene Boaz, 2007–2010
Susan Sprague, 2010-2014
Lisa Blaylock, 2014-2022
Heather Green, 2014-2023
Earl Kim, 2022 - Present
