= Methodist Church of Peru =

Autonomous affiliate of the United Methodist Church

The Methodist Church of Peru (Spanish: Iglesia Metodista del Perú) is an autonomous affiliate church of the United Methodist Church. Founded in the 1870s, the denomination has approximately 32,000 members in 130 congregations. It is a member of the World Council of Churches.

== History ==
The first Methodist church was established in 1889 in Callao. In 1970, the denomination became independent and established six administrative districts.

== Social issues ==
The denomination ordains men and women as pastors. In 2015, the church agreed to discuss issues related to homosexuality and the blessing of same-sex unions and is considered to be among the progressive denominations in Peru.
