= Cedrick Bridgeforth =

American United Methodist clergyman

Cedrick D. Bridgeforth (born in Decatur, Alabama) is an American United Methodist clergyman who was elected bishop by the Western Jurisdictional Conference in November 2022. He is the first openly gay African American man to be elected bishop in the United Methodist Church.

== Life ==
Since he is openly gay and married, he was elected in defiance of the denomination's ban on openly gay and non-celibate clergy. He was assigned to the Greater Northwest Episcopal Area and began serving it on January 1, 2023.

He was elected on the 18th ballot at the conference held at Christ United Methodist Church in Salt Lake City, Utah.

At the time of his election, Bridgeforth was director of innovation and communication in the denomination's California-Pacific Conference. His previous ministry appointments have included serving as pastor of Crenshaw United Methodist Church in Los Angeles, California (2003-2008); district superintendent in Pasadena, California (2008-2015); and lead pastor of Grace United Methodist Church in Los Angeles (2015-2017, 2018-2021).

A native of Decatur, Alabama, and graduate of Danville High School. He served in the United States Air Force for four years before enrolling in Samford University from which he received a B.A. in religion in 1997. He received the M.Div. from Claremont School of Theology in 2000, and the Ed.D. from Pepperdine University in 2006.

He is married to Christopher Hucks-Ortiz and is the author of Alabama Grandson: A Black, Gay Minister's Passage out of Hiding (Precocity Press, 2021).
