= Leslie Rush =

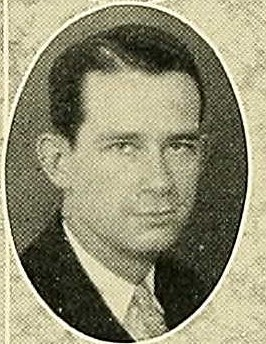
- Leslie Vaughn Rush as a student at Tulane University, 1926
- Born: Leslie Vaughn Rush; February 16, 1905; Meridian, Mississippi, U.S.
- Died: February 8, 1987 (aged 81); Meridian, Mississippi, U.S.
- Burial place: Magnolia Cemetery; Meridian, Mississippi
- Education: Tulane University School of Medicine
- Occupation: Surgeon
- Employer: Rush's Infirmary (later Rush Foundation Hospital)
- Known for: Development of bone pinning technique
- Spouse: Katherine Brooks
- Children: 2
- Parents: Jesse Hackley Rush (father); Mary Cornelia Hunnicutt (mother)
- Relatives: Al and Fred Key (second cousins); Benjamin T. Rush (grand uncle); Julian Rush (first cousin once removed); Anne Mollegen Smith (first cousin once removed)

Leslie Rush (1905 – 1987) was an American surgeon who helped revolutionize the treatment of bone fractures.

== Biography ==
Leslie Vaughn Rush was born in Meridian, Mississippi on February 16, 1905, the third and youngest child of Dr. Jesse Hackley Rush and his wife, the former Mary Hunnicutt.

On February 15, 1915, the day before his tenth birthday, Leslie's father founded Rush's Infirmary, the first private hospital in Meridian. Leslie would eventually follow his father, his uncle James Calvin Rush and older brother H. Lowry Rush into the medical profession.

Rush attended the Tulane University College of Medicine. At Tulane he was a member of the Sigma Alpha Epsilon and Phi Chi fraternities. He joined the staff of his father's hospital in 1927.

In 1936, Leslie made medical history when he performed the first known bone pinning in the United States. This revolutionary treatment of bone fractures led to the development of the "Rush pin," which is still use today.

In 1944, Dr. Rush along with Catherine Hovious, and Dr. H.M. Ivey, superintendent of Meridian Public Schools, joined forces with Meridian Junior College and initiated the first junior college and hospital nursing program in the state of Mississippi.

He died in February 1987.
