= Paul Abels =

American Methodist minister (1937–1992)

The Reverend Paul Abels
- Born: Paul Milford Abels; August 4, 1937; Yellow Springs, Ohio, US
- Died: March 12, 1992 (aged 54); Rensselaerville, New York, US
- Education: Drew University; United Theological Seminary
- Years active: 1963–1989
- Religion: Christianity (Methodist)
- Church: Methodist Church (bef. 1968); United Methodist Church (aft. 1968)
- Ordained: 1963
- Congregations served: Washington Square Methodist Episcopal Church

Paul Milford Abels (1937–1992) was an American Methodist minister who became the country's first openly gay minister with a congregation in a major Christian denomination. He served as pastor from 1973 to 1984 of the Washington Square Methodist Episcopal Church in the Greenwich Village area of New York City.

== Early life and career ==
Paul Milford Abels was born on August 4, 1937, in Yellow Springs, Ohio, to Carrie Mae (Atkins) and James Albert Abels. He attended public schools in Yellow Springs and Cedarville, Ohio. As a teenager, he was editor-in-chief of his high school newspaper, and wrote a column in the local newspaper, the Cedarville Herald. After graduating from high school, Abels moved to Madison, New Jersey, to study at the College of Liberal Arts at Drew University, from which he received a Bachelor of Arts degree in 1959. He was commissioned as a deacon in 1961 by the Newark Conference of the Methodist Church. (Note: The Methodist Church would go on to merge with the Evangelical United Brethren Church to form the United Methodist Church in 1968.) Abels went on to attend Drew Theological School, from which he received a Master of Divinity degree in 1963. He was ordained as an elder the same year. He received a Master of Sacred Music degree from United Theological Seminary in 1965 following approval of his thesis entitled An Ecumenical Manual of Song for Young Churchmen. He served as music minister for churches in Towaco and Hasbrouck Heights, New Jersey, and as pastor in West New York, New Jersey.

From 1964 to 1969, Abels worked for the National Council of Churches (NCC) in New York City, initially as a program assistant in youth ministry, and later as director for the arts. He compiled and edited Anthology of Religious Folk Music and New Hymns for a New Day, published by the NCC, which included some of his own hymns. After leaving the NCC, he worked in performing arts management. He founded Provo Muse, the first non-profit performing arts management company in the United States, served as the director of church music for Galaxy Music Corporation, and was the director of the Westbeth Artists Housing Community.

== Pastorate of Washington Square Methodist Episcopal Church ==
Abels was appointed pastor of Washington Square Methodist Episcopal Church in 1973, a year after having joined the congregation. One of the most progressive congregations in Manhattan, it was often called the "Peace Church" as it was well known for its anti-war activism, particularly during the Vietnam War. It has also been described as "a sanctuary for gay New Yorkers" as a result of its large gay and lesbian membership. As pastor, Abels launched a $1.5-million restoration campaign for the church, which had a $450,000 endowment.

In 1977, Abels came out as gay to the church in a sermon at the Education Conference on Homosexuality and the United Methodist Church, a conference organized by the gay Methodist organization Affirmation which was being hosted at Washington Square Methodist Episcopal Church. The first openly gay minister with a congregation in a major Christian denomination in the United States, Abels said that his having come out was met with little disapproval at the time. In the same year, he performed several "covenant ceremonies" for same-sex couples, which were similar to marriage ceremonies, causing public controversy after they were brought to public attention by The New York Times. He had received approval from the church's board prior to performing the services.

These events were taking place the wake of a defeated motion at the United Methodist Church's 1976 General Conference that sought to reverse the conference's 1972 condemnation of homosexuality. At the same conference, delegates voted to strengthen language in the Book of Discipline prohibiting same-sex marriage and to prohibit the funding of "any 'gay' causes or group, or otherwise [using church] funds to promote the acceptance of homosexuality."

The year following Abels' coming out, his bishop, W. Ralph Ward, with the support of his cabinet, asked Abels to take a leave of absence for a year. There was precedent within the New York Conference of the United Methodist Church for taking such an action; in 1977, Edward Egan of Metropolitan‐Duane United Methodist Church was asked to take a leave of absence for a year after coming out as gay, before ultimately retiring. (Note: Ward had previously tried to transfer Egan to a small church in Queens but the local church would not accept him on account of his homosexuality.) Abels, however, refused to do so and the matter was brought before the conference's board of ministry. In a 23–15 vote, the board decided that it "affirmed his ministry", in essence overruling the bishop. There being no charges against Abels before the board of ministry or the church courts, Ward later recommended reappointing Abels, though Ward noted that the conference's action "was in no way an approval of homosexuality as a life style". Leaders of Good News, a conservative evangelical Methodist group, called for Ward's resignation after he was unsuccessful in dismissing Abels. Ward brought the matter before the Judicial Council, the church's highest court, which in 1979 ruled that Abels was in "good standing" and, therefore, the church's Book of Discipline mandated that he be reappointed to his pastorate.

== Retirement from active ministry ==
At the age of 46 years, Abels took early retirement from the pastorate in June 1984, the month following the General Conference's 568–404 decision to prohibit the ordination and appointment of "self-avowed, practicing homosexuals" to the pastorate. He moved to Rensselaerville, New York, with Thom Hunt, his partner of approximately six years, where they restored Catalpa House and opened it as a bed and breakfast. He was the executive director of Equinox Services Agency in Albany, New York, from 1984 to 1989.

Abels died of complications from AIDS on March 12, 1992. A memorial service was held at Washington Square Methodist Episcopal Church on March 22 and another service was held a month later at Rensselaerville Presbyterian Church.

Twenty-five years after Abels' death, the New York Annual Conference (NYAC) of the United Methodist Church adopted a petition recognizing that "a terrible injustice was done to these two dedicated and faithful pastors [Egan and Abels]" and that the conference's "actions and the subsequent unstated policy of 'don't ask, don't tell' in the NYAC did untold damage to LGBTQI clergy and laity in the NYAC". The conference "express[ed] deep remorse for the harm done and the pain experienced by Rev. Dr. Ed Egan and his companion, Russ Morin, and by Rev. Paul Abels and his companion Thomas Hunt and ask[ed] for God's forgiveness and theirs".

== See also ==
- Homosexuality and Methodism
- Gene Leggett
- Karen Oliveto
- Julian Rush
