= J. H. Rush =

American physician

Jesse Hackley (J.H.) Rush (September 6, 1868 – January 22, 1931) was an American physician who founded the first private hospital in Meridian, Mississippi.

== Background ==
Jesse Hackley Rush was born in Kemper County, Mississippi on 6 September 1868. He was the second of thirteen children of William Vaughn and Julia (Key) Rush. Abel Mastin Key, his maternal grandfather was one of the founders of Kemper County, serving as its first circuit clerk.

Rush and several of his brothers would pursue careers in health care.

== Career ==
Rush began his professional career as a dentist in Meridian, Mississippi. In 1910, he graduated with highest honors from the Mississippi Medical College. He received additional training in the field of surgery at New York Polyclinic in New York City.

He was one of seven individuals who founded the Meridian Sanitarium in the early 20th century.

In 1915, J. H. Rush founded Rush's Infirmary, an 18-bed facility that became the first private hospital in Meridian, Mississippi. When Rush's Infirmary opened, the staff consisted of Dr. and Mrs. Rush, one registered nurse and six student nurses. Rapid growth soon followed.

Dr. J. H. Rush died at 5:15 p.m. at Rush's Infirmary on Thursday, January 22, 1931 at the age of 62. His work continued, however, and in 1947, the hospital became a non-profit institution and was renamed Rush Memorial Hospital in commemoration of its founder. In 1965, the facility became known as Rush Foundation Hospital.

In 2022, Rush Health Systems (which includes several regional facilities) merged with Ochsner Health to become Ochsner Rush Health.

== Family ==
Rush married Mary Hunnicutt (1874–1954) and this union produced three children: H(ubert) Lowry, Dorothy and Leslie Vaughn, who all survived him. His sons H. Lowry and Leslie would follow in their father's footsteps and join the medical profession; Leslie Rush's contribution to orthopedic medicine is the invention of the "Rush Pin", which revolutionized the treatment of bone fractures and has continued to be used in the 21st century.
