= List of Presbyterian and Reformed denominations in North America =

This is a list of Presbyterian and Reformed denominations in North America.

== Presbyterian denominations ==
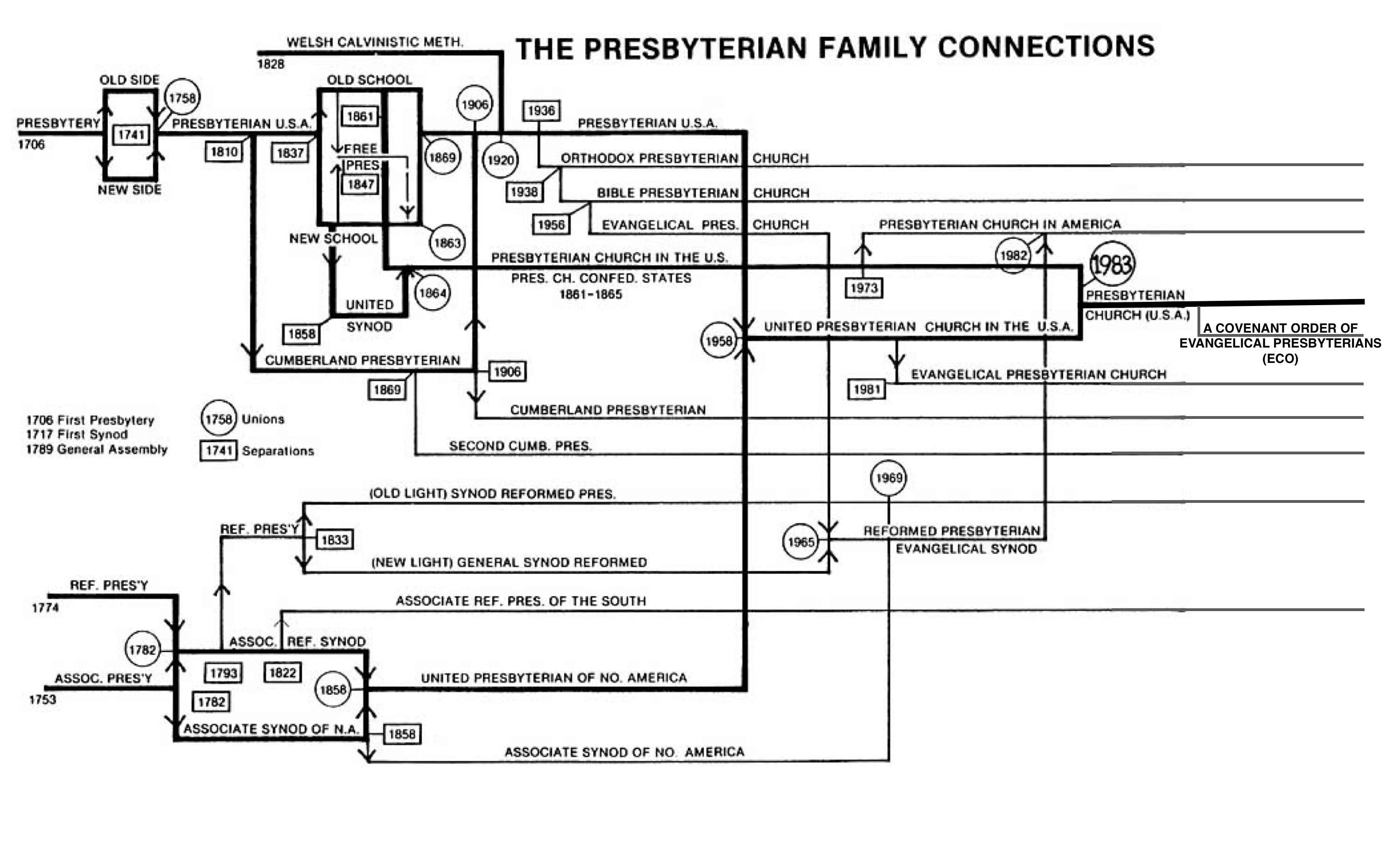
Historical chart of Presbyterian denominations in the United States

=== Larger Presbyterian denominations ===
- Associate Reformed Presbyterian Church – around 22,459 members (2018) – Orthodox, Presbyterian, Calvinist, Covenanter & Seceder
- Bible Presbyterian Church – around 3,500 members – Orthodox, Presbyterian, Calvinist
- partially: Communion of Reformed Evangelical Churches – around 15,000 members – Evangelical/Orthodox, Dutch Reformed/Presbyterian, Calvinist
- Cumberland Presbyterian Church – around 65,087 members (2019) – Liberal, Presbyterian, Arminian
- Cumberland Presbyterian Church in America – around 6,500 members – Liberal, Presbyterian, Arminian
- Evangelical Assembly of Presbyterian Churches in America- 73 churches in the USA – formed by churches of Korean and Chinese origin.
- ECO (Covenant Order of Evangelical Presbyterians) – more than 129,765 members, 320 churches and 500 Pastors (2018) – Evangelical, Presbyterian
- Evangelical Presbyterian Church – around 122,216 members (2018) – Evangelical, Presbyterian, Charismatic
- Korean-American Presbyterian Church – around 80,000 members – Conservative Evangelical, Korean-Presbyterian, Calvinist
- National Presbyterian Church in Mexico – around 2,800,000 members – Conservative Calvinist
- Korean Presbyterian Church Abroad – around 55,000 members – Progressive Evangelical, Korean-Presbyterian
- Orthodox Presbyterian Church – around 31,472 members (2019)- Orthodox, Presbyterian, Calvinist
- Presbyterian Church in America – around 400,000 members (2024) – Evangelical, Presbyterian, Calvinist
- Presbyterian Church in Canada – around 225,000 members – Presbyterian
- Presbyterian Church (USA) – around 1,045,000 members (2024) – Liberal, Presbyterian
- Presbyterian Reformed Church of Mexico – 26,000 members – Orthodox, Presbyterian, Calvinist
- Reformed Presbyterian Church of North America – around 7,800 members – Orthodox, Exclusive Psalmody, A cappella, Covenanter, Presbyterian, Calvinist
- partially: United Church of Canada – around 388,000 members (as of 12/31/2018) – Liberal, Presbyterian & Congregational & Methodist
- World Korean Presbyterian Church – around 300 churches – Conservative Fundamentalist, Korean-Presbyterian, Calvinist

=== Smaller Presbyterian denominations ===
- Associate Reformed Presybterian Church in Canada - 12 congregations - Orthodox, Presbyterian, Calvinist, Covenanter & Seceder
- American Presbyterian Church – 2 congregations - Orthodox, Presbyterian, Calvinist
- Christ Reformed Presbyterian Church - 4 congregations - Orthodox, Presbyterian, Calvinist
- Covenant Presbyterian Church – Orthodox, Presbyterian, Calvinist
- Covenant Reformed Presbyterian Church – Orthodox, 1646 Westminster Confession, Presbyterian, Calvinist
- partially: Evangel Presbytery – 10 congregations - Orthodox, Presbyterian/Credobaptist, Calvinist
- Faith Presbytery, Bible Presbyterian Church
- Free Presbyterian Church – Orthodox, Presbyterian, Calvinist
- Independent Presbyterian Church in Mexico – 2,500 members and 35 congregations – Orthodox, Presbyterian, Calvinist
- National Conservative Presbyterian Church in Mexico – Orthodox, Presbyterian, Calvinist
- Presbyterian Reformed Church - 6 congregations - Orthodox, Presbyterian, Calvinist
- Reformation Presbyterian Church, Australia Presbytery - 1 US congregation - Orthodox, Presbyterian, Calvinist
- Reformed Presbyterian Church of Canada - 9 Congregations - Orthodox, Presbyterian, Calvinist
- Reformed Presbyterian Church - Hanover Presbytery – Orthodox, Presbyterian, Calvinist
- Reformed Presbyterian Church General Assembly – Orthodox, Presbyterian, Calvinist
- Reformed Presbytery in North America – Orthodox, Covenanter Presbyterian, Calvinist
- Upper Cumberland Presbyterian Church – less than 1000 members – Conservative, Presbyterian, Four-Point Calvinist
- Vanguard Presbytery – Orthodox, Presbyterian, Calvinist
- Westminster Churches of America - 16 congregations - Presbyterian, Calvinist

=== Korean Presbyterian denominations ===
- Korean-American Presbyterian Church
- Korean Presbyterian Church in America (Kosin)
- Korean Presbyterian Church Abroad
- Korean Evangelical Presbyterian Church in America
- World Korean Presbyterian Church

=== Scottish Presbyterian denominations ===
- Free Church of Scotland – has 5 congregations on Prince Edward Island
- Free Church of Scotland (Continuing) – has 11 congregations in the USA and Canada
- Free Presbyterian Church of Scotland – has 2 congregations in the US and Canada

Chart of splits and mergers of North American Presbyterian churches

Splits and mergers of North American Presbyterian churches

Irish Presbyterians	Scottish Presbyterians	English Presbyterians
Presbyterian independent congregations (1700s)
Presbytery of Philadelphia (1706)
Synod of Philadelphia (1717)
The Old Side–New Side controversy	Conjunct Presbyteries (1741)	First Great Awakening
Presbytery of New York (1745)
Synod of New York (1745)
Reformed Presbytery (1752)
Associate Presbytery in America (1753)
Synod of N.Y. & Phila. (1758)
Associate Reformed Synod (1782)	Associate Synod of North America (1782)
PC-USA (1789)	Left Presbyterianism and founded the Restoration movement
RPCNA (1798)	Second Great Awakening	Springfield Presbytery (1803)
Southern Synod (1931)	Northern Synod (1831)	CPC (1810)
The Old School–New School controversy
RPC-GS (1833)
PC-USA (Old School) (1837)	New School (1837)
UPCNA (1858)	United Synod (South) (1858)
North-South divide	PC-CSA (1861)
PCUS (1864)
1/10 of the RPCNA merged	PC-USA (1869)	2/3 of the CPC reunited	CPCA (1869)
UPCNA (1891)	PC-USA (1906)	Fundamentalist–modernist controversy
OPC (1936)
BPC (1937)
EPC (1956)
UPCUSA (1958)
RPCES (1965)
PCA (1973)
EPC (1981)
PCA (1982)
PC(USA) (1983)	RPCUSA (1983)
RPC-HP (1991)	RPC-GA (1991)
ARPC (1994)
PCA (1997)
RPC-HP (2006)	CPC (2006)
ECO (2012)
VP (2020)

== Congregational denominations ==
- partially: United Church of Canada – ~2,800,000 members – Liberal, Presbyterian & Congregational & Methodist
- partially: United Church of Christ – 712,296 members and 4,603 churches – Liberal, German Reformed & Congregational
- National Association of Congregational Christian Churches – ~35,000 members and 300 churches
- Conservative Congregational Christian Conference – ~41,000 members and 300 churches- Evangelical, Congregational
- Congregational Christian Churches in Canada – ~7,000 members – Evangelical, Congregational
- Evangelical Association of Reformed and Congregational Christian Churches

=== US Congregational Family Tree ===
National Council of the Congregational Churches of the United States; 1865	Christian Connection; 1810
Congregational Christian Churches; 1931
Conservative Congregational Christian Conference; 1948	National Association of Congregational Christian Churches; 1955

Evangelical Synod of North America; 1872	Reformed Church in the United States; 1725 (Eureka Synod excepted from merger)
Evangelical and Reformed Church; 1934
United Church of Christ; 1957	Evangelical Association of Reformed and Congregational Christian Churches; 1998

Note that ESNA, RCUS and E&R churches held to presbyterian polity.

== European Reformed denominations ==
=== Episcopal/Anglican Reformed denominations ===
- Reformed Episcopal Church – around 13,000 members – Orthodox, Episcopal/Anglican, Calvinistic
- Traditional Protestant Episcopal Church – Orthodox, Episcopal/Anglican
- Anglican Mission in the Americas
- Anglican Church in North America
- Reformed Anglican Church
- United Episcopal Church of North America

=== Dutch Reformed denominations ===
- Alliance of Reformed Churches – 125 churches – Evangelical, Conservative, Dutch Reformed, Calvinistic
- Christian Reformed Church in North America – around 171,770 members – Evangelical, Conservative, Dutch Reformed, Calvinistic, Egalitarian (women can assume any church office)
- Evangelical Reformed Church in America – Conservative, Evangelical, Calvinist, Orthodox, Dutch Reformed
- partially: Kingdom Network – 32 churches – Evangelical, Conservative, Dutch Reformed/Credobaptist, Calvinistic
- Reformed Church in America – around 83,000 members – Liberal & Conservative, Dutch Reformed
- United Reformed Churches in North America – around 23,302 members – Orthodox, Dutch Reformed, Calvinistic
- Canadian and American Reformed Churches – around 17,729 members – Orthodox, Dutch Reformed, Calvinistic
- partially: Communion of Reformed Evangelical Churches – around 15,000 members – Evangelical/Orthodox, Dutch Reformed/Presbyterian, Calvinistic
- Netherlands Reformed Congregations – around 10,790 members – Puritan, Dutch Reformed, Calvinistic
- Reformed Congregations in North America
- Protestant Reformed Churches in America – around 8,055 members – Orthodox, Dutch Reformed, strictly Calvinistic
- Reformed Protestant Churches, The Federation of - 4 churches - Dutch Reformed, strictly Calvinistic
- Free Reformed Churches in North America – around 4,689 members – Orthodox, Dutch Reformed, Calvinistic
- Heritage Reformed Congregations – around 2,000 members – Puritan, Dutch Reformed, Calvinistic
- Restored Reformed Church - Dutch denomination, 1 congregation in Ontario
- The Sending Network – 13 churches, all in Iowa – Evangelical, Conservative, Dutch Reformed, Calvinistic
- Reformation Canada Network – 14 churches, all in Canada – Evangelical, Conservative, Dutch Reformed, Calvinistic

=== German and French Reformed denominations ===
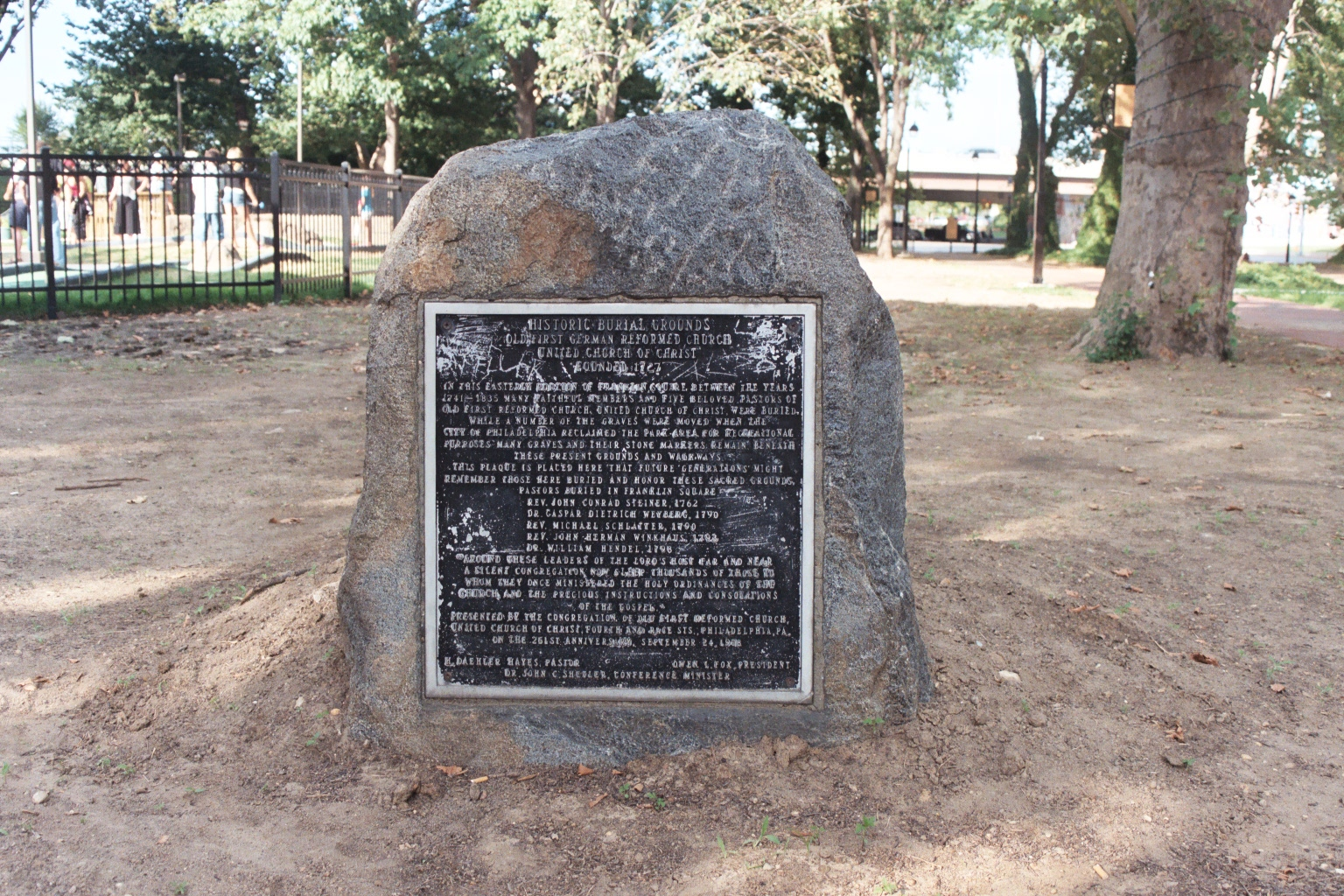
Franklin Square burial ground plaque for the German Reformed Church of the United Church of Christ

- partially: United Church of Christ – around 712,000 members – Liberal, German Reformed & Congregational
- French Protestant (Huguenot) Church, Charleston, SC——The only French Calvinist or Huguenot congregation still existing in the United States.
- Reformed Church in the United States – around 5,000 members – Orthodox, German Reformed, Calvinistic
- L'Église réformée du Québec (Reformed Church of Quebec) – around 500 members – Orthodox, French Reformed, Calvinistic

=== Other European Reformed denominations ===
- Hungarian Reformed Church of America – around 10,500 members – Conservative, Hungarian Reformed
- Calvin Synod - United Church of Christ – around 3,500 members – Conservative, Hungarian Reformed
- Lithuanian Evangelical Reformed Church – Liberal, Lithuanian Reformed

Chart of splits and mergers of North American Continental Reformed and Congregationalist churches

Splits and mergers of North American Continental Reformed and Congregationalist churches

English Independent Puritans
Pilgrims (1610s)
Congregationalist churches (1620s)
Some congregations became unitarian	Dutch Reformed Church in America (1628)
RCUS (1793)
RCA (1819)
AUA (1825)
German pietist protestant churches (1830s)
CRC(1857)
NCCCUS (1865)
ESNA (1872)
CRC (1882)
Hungarian Reformed Classis (1896)
Hungarian Synod	NRC (1907)
RCUS (1921)
HRCA (1924)	PRC (1924)
CC
CCC (1931)
ACC	E&R (1934)	Eureka Classis (1934)
CCCC (1948)
CCC (1950)	CanRC (1950)	FRCNA (1950)
OPRC (1953)
NACCC (1955)
UCC (1957)
CRCNA (1961)
RCNA (1967)
OCRC (1979)
RCUS (1985)
HRC (1993)
URCNA (1996)
EARCCC (2005)
URCNA (2008)
KN (2021)	ARC (2021)

== Reformed Baptist ==
- Reformed Baptist
- Association of Reformed Baptist Churches of America www.arbca.com
- Fellowship of Independent Reformed Evangelicals www.firefellowship.org
- Primitive Baptists
- Trinity Fellowship Churches - 1689 London Baptist Confession, Charismatic, Presbyterian polity

== Reformed Charismatic ==
- Sovereign Grace Churches
- Newfrontiers in the United States

== Uniting and United denominations ==
- United Church of Canada – around 2,800,000 members – Liberal, Presbyterian & Congregational & Methodist
- United Church of Christ – around 712,000 members – Liberal, German Reformed & Congregational
- Communion of Reformed Evangelical Churches – around 15,000 members – Evangelical/Orthodox, Dutch Reformed/Presbyterian, Calvinistic

== Other ==
- New Calvinism

== See also ==
- American Presbyterianism
- List of Reformed churches
