= United Reformed Churches in North America =

Federation of churches

- Abbreviation: URCNA, URC, or URCs
- Classification: Protestant
- Orientation: Continental (Dutch) Reformed (Afgescheidenen)
- Theology: Confessional (Three Forms) Reformed
- Governance: Presbyterian
- Ecclesiastical fellowship: CanRC (since 2001); RCUS (since 2004); OPC (since 2007); ERQ (since 2012); RPCNA (since 2012)
- Associations: North American Presbyterian and Reformed Council, International Conference of Reformed Churches
- Region: United States and Canada
- Origin: 1996; Lynwood, Illinois
- Separated from: Christian Reformed Church in North America
- Absorbed: Orthodox Christian Reformed Churches (2008)
- Congregations: 130 (2021)
- Members: 25,288 (2021)
- Ministers: 198 (2021)
- Official website: www.urcna.org

The United Reformed Churches in North America (URCNA) is a theologically conservative federation of Reformed churches founded in 1996. Many churches joined the URCNA after splitting from the Christian Reformed Church in North America denomination.

== Origin ==
The URCNA has grown from the earlier Protestant movements in Europe of the 16th and 17th century, and also from Reformed churches in Belgium and the Netherlands. Like other churches in the Reformed tradition, it traces its interpretation of Scripture back to the sixteenth-century reformer, John Calvin. Although Reformed theology took root in many countries in Europe, it took especial hold in the Netherlands. Dutch immigrants to North America carried their beliefs with them over the subsequent centuries. Rather than joining existing churches of other denominations in North America, these Dutch immigrants started their own churches, churches that became known as the Christian Reformed Church in North America (CRCNA). Over the twentieth century, the CRCNA grew progressively more liberal. Conservative Reformed believers were generally concerned that the CRCNA was departing from Scriptural teaching to accommodate modern social trends. Specific disagreements arose on issues like women's ordination, evolution cases, and biblical inerrancy.

In 1996, the URCNA was founded as a federation of Reformed churches in 1996 at Lynwood, Illinois CRC. Most of the members that founded the URCNA left the CRCNA, and some members of other Reformed denominations quickly joined the new federation. Some 36 churches with 7,600 members joined the federative unity, held their first Synod, and adopted the name United Reformed Churches in North America.

== Beliefs ==
The URCNA subscribes to three confessions of faith: the Canons of Dordt, written in 1618 and 1619 by an international group of Reformed churches, the Belgic Confession, written by Guido de Bres in the mid-1500s, and the Heidelberg Catechism, formally attributed to Zacharias Ursinus and Caspar Olevianus in the city of Heidelberg, Germany. Collectively, these statements of faith are called the "Three Forms of Unity." In addition to these forms, the URCNA holds to the three ecumenical creeds: the Apostles Creed, the Nicene Creed, and the Athanasian Creed. The URCNA believes that the ancient Christian creeds and Reformation Three Forms of Unity are not only biblically in agreement with the Word of God but are beneficial to be used today.

The URCNA believe that "marriage is designed to be a lifelong, monogamous covenantal union between one man and one woman."

Synod 2007 of the URCNA adopted without dissent the following after receiving its 75-page study report: "That Synod urge all officer-bearers to repudiate Federal Vision teachings where they are not in harmony with the following articles [listed in the report] from the Three Forms of Unity."

== Practices ==
The practices of the URCNA are governed by a church order derived from the Synod of Dordt of 1618–1619. The URCNA church order outlines the duties of the three ecclesiastical offices of minister, elder, and deacon within the denomination.

It also sets out the denomination's decentralized presbyteral form of church government as opposed to the hierarchical form of government found within the Anglican Church or Roman Catholic Church. Each congregation is governed by a consistory made up of the elders elected from the congregation and the minister of the congregation. Periodically, delegates from each consistory will attend a regional classis or a denomination-wide synod to discuss matters pertaining to the entire denomination. Both classes and synods are temporary bodies with no formal authority. Although they may provide advice on matters to local consistories that carry great weight, the final authority rests with the consistories of each local congregation.

The church order articulates many practices that the congregations of the URCNA do in common. URCNA churches hold two services every Sunday with the expectation that members attend both services (art. 37). The morning service typically focuses on preaching based on a particular passage in the Bible, while the afternoon or evening service normally is dedicated to explaining one of the doctrines articulated in the Three Forms of Unity (art. 40). Both psalms and hymns may be sung during the worship service, although psalms predominate (art. 39). The URCNA practices infant baptism (art. 41) and requires a public profession of faith once members are spiritually mature in order to partake of the Lord's Supper (art. 43).

The URCNA church order also outlines the process of church discipline (arts. 51–66).

== Statistics ==
URCNA churches can be found in 25 U.S. States plus the District of Columbia, with many in the Upper Midwest (Iowa and Michigan) and California, and in six Canadian Provinces, mostly in Ontario, Alberta, and British Columbia. As of 2024, the churches have grown, both through additional members leaving the CRCNA in the late 1990s as well as church planting efforts, to 124 churches and 15 church plants spread across the United States and Canada, with 25,574 members. 212 ministers serve as pastors of local congregations (121), missions (27), theological education (6), seminary professors (10), chaplains (4), as well as 42 emerited ministers. The church had 8 Classis (Michigan, Central US, Eastern US, Southwest US, Pacific Northwest, Ontario-East, Southwestern Ontario, Western Canada) in 2024.

== Missions ==
The URCNA supports many missions in the U.S. and around the world. Mission churches can be found in Ecuador, Costa Rica, Mexico, France, Italy, Romania and Turkey. Individual members and individual churches may support missions through parachurch mission organizations such as Word and Deed although the denomination also has its own URCNA Missions coordinator. The URCNA monthly missions newsletter is called The Trumpet.

== Training of ministers ==
The United Reformed Churches do not have a denominational seminary or college; rather, Candidates for Ministry are extensively examined by their Calling Church and Classis regardless of seminary prior to their ordination or installation. Most of the ministers of the URCNA have been trained at Calvin Theological Seminary (Grand Rapids, Michigan), Mid-America Reformed Seminary (Dyer, Indiana), or Westminster Seminary in California (Escondido, California) but the number of other seminaries represented is growing.

== Mergers ==
The Orthodox Christian Reformed Churches, another breakaway from the Christian Reformed Church, voted to join the URCNA in 2008 upon the latter's invitation.

== Interchurch relationships ==
The URCNA is in ecclesiastical fellowship with the Canadian and American Reformed Churches, Reformed Church in the United States, Orthodox Presbyterian Church, Reformed Church of Quebec and Reformed Presbyterian Church of North America.

The URCNA is also in corresponding relations with the Associate Reformed Presbyterian Church, Free Reformed Churches of North America, Heritage Reformed Congregations, Korean American Presbyterian Church, Korean Presbyterian Church in America (Kosin) and the Presbyterian Church in America. It is a member of the International Conference of Reformed Churches and the North American Presbyterian and Reformed Council.

== Notable people in the history of URCNA ==
- W. Robert Godfrey (b. 1945)
- Cornelis Venema (b. 1954)
- R. Scott Clark (b. 1961)
- Michael Horton (b. 1964)
