= Presbyterianism in the United States =

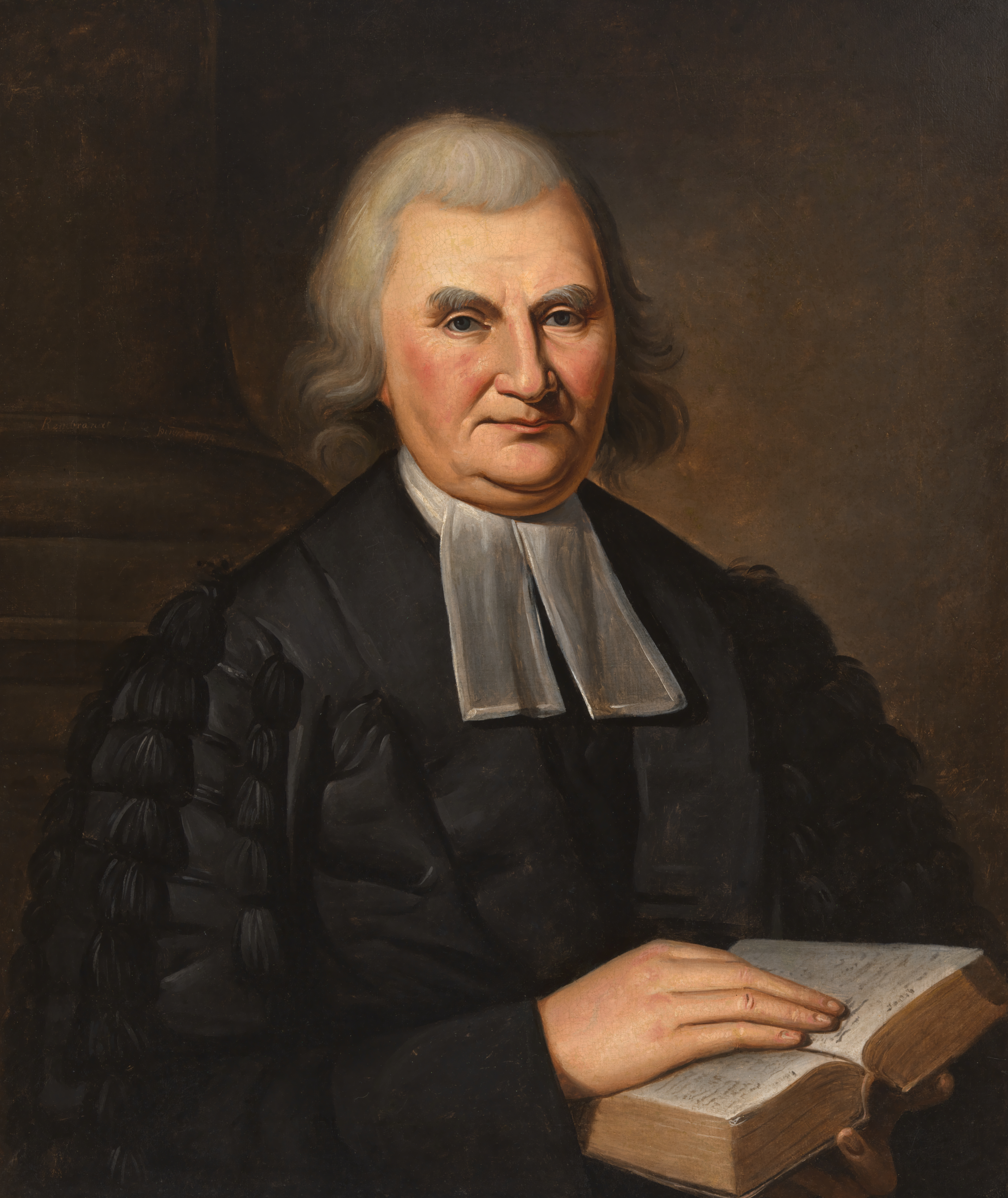
Presbyterian Pastor and Founding Father Rev. John Witherspoon was the only minister to sign the Declaration of Independence in 1776. He was the first Moderator of the General Assembly of the Presbyterian Church in the New Nation and a proponent of the Constitution of the United States.

Presbyterianism has been present in the United States since colonial times and has exerted an important influence on broader American religion and culture. Throughout U.S. history, Presbyterians have played a prominent role in society. From their initial arrival in the new world in the early 1640s, they established the first Presbytery in 1706 under Rev. Francis Makemie in Philadelphia. Presbyterians mainly came from Scotland or Ulster (now Northern Ireland) to the Middle Colonies, most often Pennsylvania. Presbyterians (particularly Jonathan Dickinson and Aaron Burr Sr.) established Princeton University in 1746 to educate clergy in alignment with the theology pioneered by William Tennent, and later produced the "Princeton Theologians" such as Charles Hodge. Influenced by Scottish theologians such as Samuel Rutherford and John Knox, Presbyterians largely believed that "Resistance to tyranny is obedience to God", which led them to support the American Revolution. The Revolutionary War was dubbed the "Presbyterian Rebellion" by King George III and other loyalists. Since the founding of the United States, many Presbyterians, both laity and clergy, from both the pulpit and presidency, have shaped and influenced the history and culture of the United States.

== History ==
=== European origins ===
Reformed Protestantism, of which Presbyterianism is a subset, originated in the Swiss Reformation under the leadership of Heinrich Bullinger, Huldrych Zwingli, John Knox, William Farel, and John Calvin. Among these men, the theology of John Calvin and John Knox would have the most influence. A defining characteristic of Reformed theology is a belief in predestination—that before the creation of the world, God chose some people for salvation (the elect), and this choice relied completely on God's will and in no way on human merit.

Reformed Protestants rejected many aspects of Roman Catholic theology and practice. Latin was abandoned as a liturgical language in favor of the vernacular, and preaching (rather than celebration of the Mass) became the main emphasis of church services. The traditional seven sacraments were reduced to two—baptism and the Lord's Supper. Many Reformed churches also rejected episcopal polity in favor of presbyterian polity. According to presbyterian polity, rather than rule by bishops, congregations are governed by a representative body of elders called a session. Sessions receive oversight from a series of higher representative authorities: presbyteries, synods, and general assemblies.

Reformed ideas would spread from Continental Europe to Scotland and England, where they would shape the Presbyterian churches there. As a result of the Scottish Reformation, the Church of Scotland adopted Reformed theology and presbyterian polity. Its major leader was John Knox, who studied with Calvin in Geneva. The English Reformation went in a different direction. While its Thirty-nine Articles of faith reflect mainstream Reformed theology, the Church of England and the Church of Ireland retained episcopal polity and maintained, in modified form, some liturgical traditions inherited from the Roman Church. Within the English church, there were those by the late 1500s who subscribed to presbyterian polity, and these English Presbyterians produced a collection of confessional statements, the Westminster Standards, that, to varying extents, would become authoritative for Presbyterians. In the 1600s, Presbyterianism was brought to Northern Ireland as a result of large-scale colonization from Scotland during the Plantation of Ulster.

=== Colonial era ===
==== Synod of Philadelphia ====
In the late 1600s, economic problems and religious persecution prompted many Scotch-Irish to migrate to America, and most settled in the Middle Colonies. Their numbers were augmented by Presbyterian migration from Puritan New England, and soon there were enough Presbyterians in America to organize congregations. The first ministers were recruited from Northern Ireland, including Francis Makemie, who is known as the "father of American Presbyterianism." While several Presbyterian churches had been established, they were not yet organized into presbyteries and synods.

In 1706, Makemie and seven other ministers established the first presbytery in North America, the Presbytery of Philadelphia. The presbytery was primarily created to promote fellowship and discipline among its members and only gradually developed into a governing body. Some of the members had Scotch-Irish and Scottish backgrounds. The Scotch-Irish party stressed a dogmatic adherence to confessional standards, professional ministry, and orderly, centralized church government. Other members were of English and Welsh ancestry. Having been born and educated in New England (nearly all had attended Yale College), their views on subscription and church authority were influenced by New England Congregationalism. The New England party emphasized "spontaneity, vital impulse, adaptability" and experiential piety.

As growth continued, the presbytery reorganized itself into America's first synod, the Synod of Philadelphia or General Synod, in 1717. The presbytery had avoided divisive theological controversies, and the synod followed suit in its early years, as it functioned without any official confessional statement. The Church of Scotland and the Irish Synod of Ulster already required clergy to subscribe to the Westminster Confession of Faith, but not the Larger or Shorter Catechisms. This had caused controversy in those countries. In the 1720s, the Scotch-Irish group demanded that all ministers and ministerial candidates subscribe to the Confession. This was opposed by the New England group, which felt that requiring subscription elevated the confession to the same level of authority as the Bible.

In 1729, the Synod reached a compromise with the passage of the Adopting Act. It required clergy to assent to the Westminster Confession and both the Larger and Shorter Catechisms; however, subscription was only required for those parts of the confession deemed "essential and necessary article of faith". Ministers could declare any scruples to their presbytery or the synod, which would then decide if the minister's views were acceptable.

==== Old Side–New Side Controversy (1730–1758) ====
During the 1730s and 1740s, the Presbyterian Church was divided over the impact of the First Great Awakening. Drawing from the Scotch-Irish revivalist tradition, ministers such as William and Gilbert Tennent emphasized the necessity of a conscious conversion experience and the need for higher moral standards among the clergy. Gilbert Tennent was personally influenced by the ministry of Jacob Frelinghuysen, a Dutch Reformed pastor in Raritan, New Jersey. Frelinghuysen himself had been influenced by contact with Pietism.

Other Presbyterians were concerned that revivalism presented a threat to church order. In particular, the practice of itinerant preaching across presbytery boundaries, and the tendency of revivalists to doubt the conversion experiences of other ministers, caused controversy between supporters of revivalism, known as the "New Side", and their conservative opponents, known as the "Old Side". While the Old Side and New Side disagreed over the possibility of immediate assurance of salvation, the controversy was not primarily theological. Both sides believed in justification by faith, predestination, and that regeneration occurred in stages.

In 1738, the Synod took two actions that infuriated the revivalists. They first required candidates for ordination who did not have college degrees to be examined by a committee of the Synod before being allowed to join a presbytery. At the time, there were no Presbyterian colleges in America, and candidates for the clergy were forced to attend either Harvard or Yale (both Congregational institutions), or study in Britain. Candidates unable to do so received training from pastors or at informal academies. One such academy was founded by William Tennent and became known as the Log College. The new ordination requirement was taken as an insult to these informally trained ministers, many of whom were revivalists. The second action restricted the right of clergymen to preach outside of their presbytery. Revivalists objected to this restriction, noting that itinerant preaching helped to spread the gospel and alleviate clergy shortages.

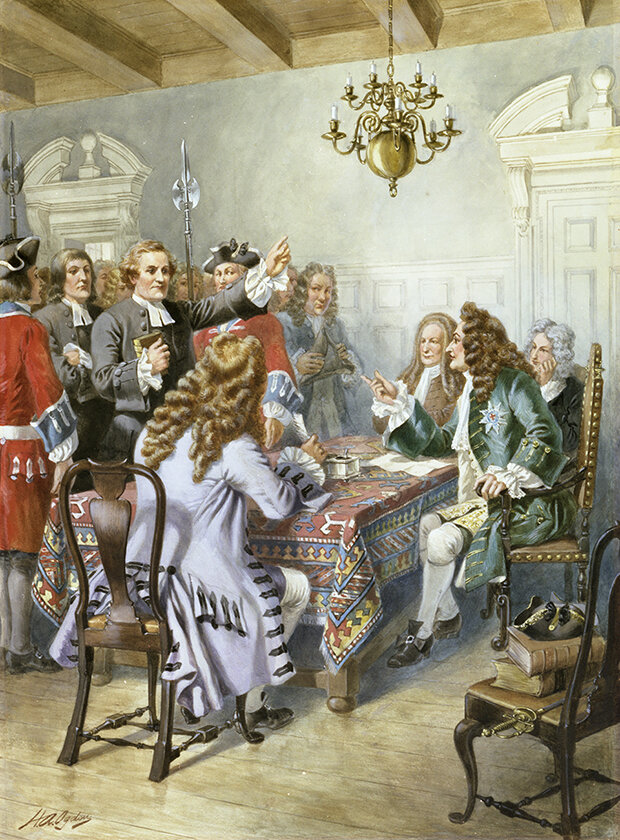
Rev. Francis Makemie (Standing) before Lord Cornbury on January 23, 1707, for preaching without a license from the British Crown.

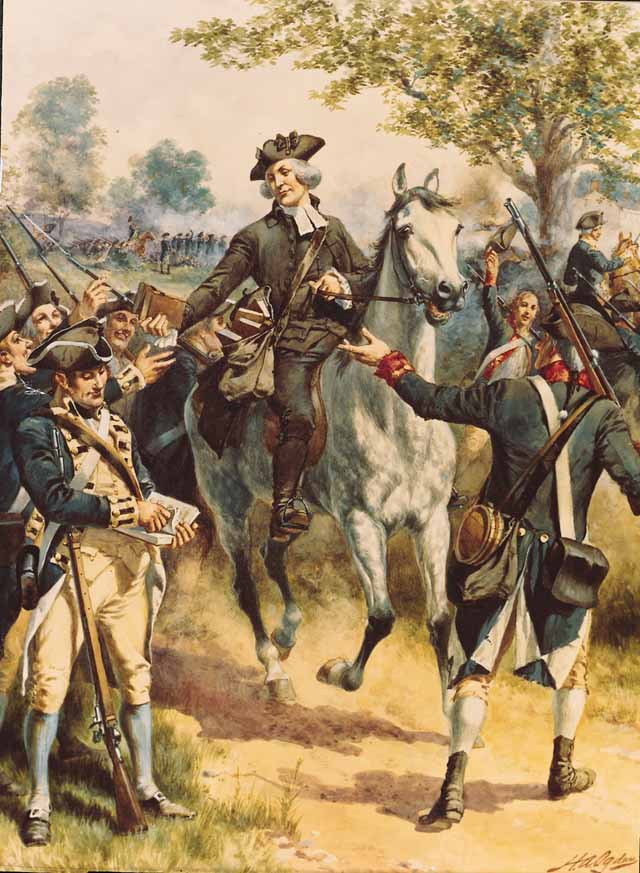
Presbyterian minister and staunch patriot Rev. James Caldwell, at the Battle of Springfield

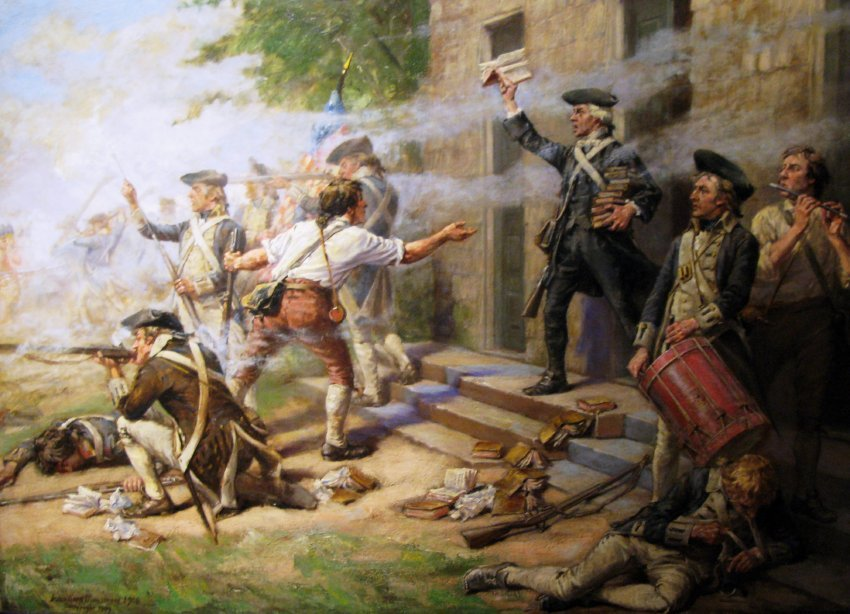
Presbyterian clergymen Rev. James Caldwell giving Continental Army soldiers paper for wadding

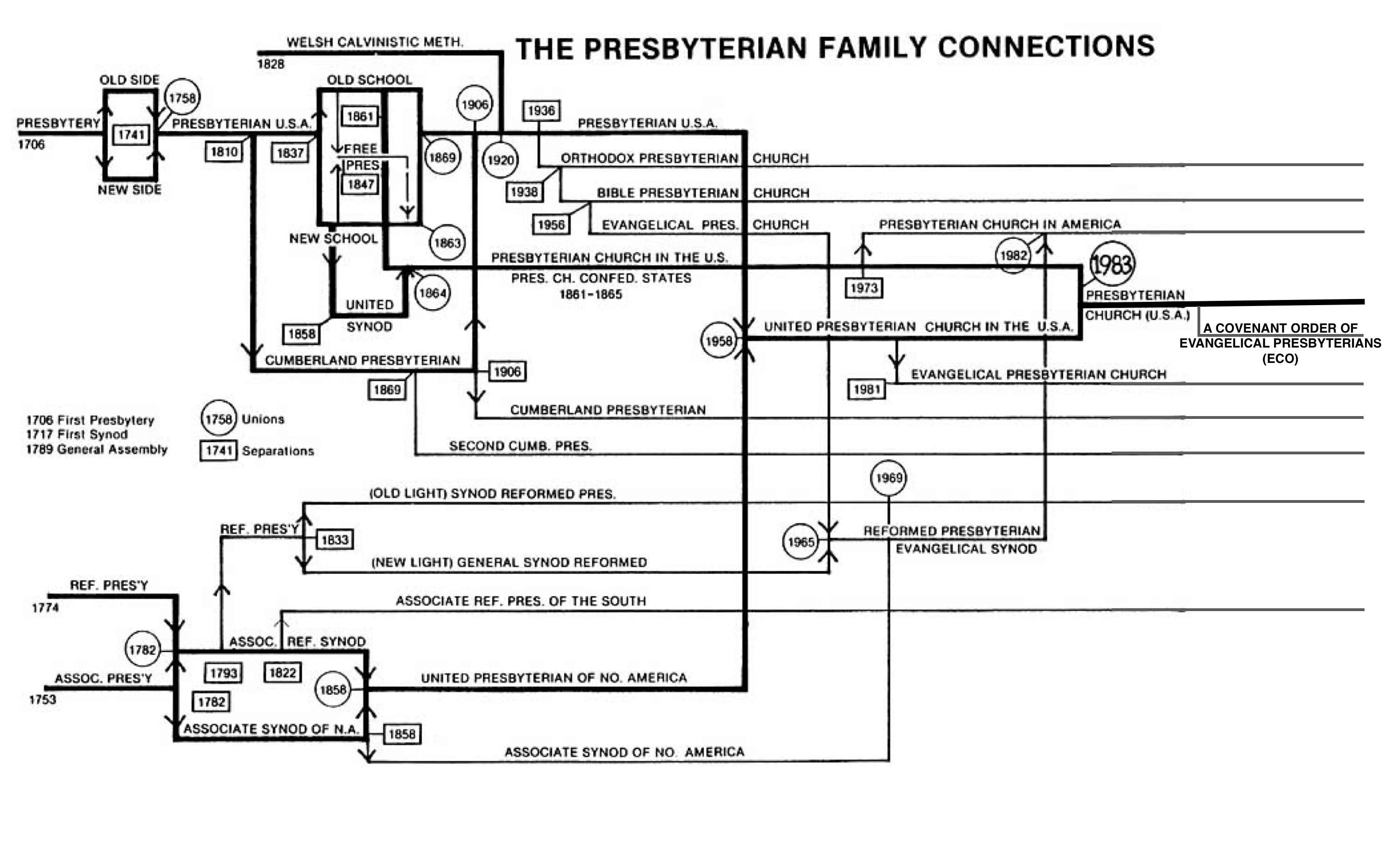
The family tree of American Presbyterianism, 1706–1983. Courtesy of the Presbyterian Historical Society, Philadelphia, PA, and updated.

Tensions between the two sides continued to escalate. When the Synod met in May 1741, relations between the two factions had reached the breaking point. By the time the meeting had concluded, a definite split had occurred. The Old Side retained control of the Synod of Philadelphia, and it immediately required unconditional subscription to the Westminster Confession with no option to state scruples.

The New Side was initially organized as the Conjunct Presbyteries of New Brunswick and Londonderry. In 1745, the Presbytery of New York, led by moderate revivalist Jonathan Dickinson, left the Philadelphia Synod and joined the Conjunct Presbyteries to form the New Side Synod of New York. The new Synod required subscription to the Westminster Confession in accordance with the Adopting Act, but no college degrees were required for ordination.

While the controversy raged, American Presbyterians were also concerned with expanding their influence. In 1740, a New York Board of the Society in Scotland for Propagating Christian Knowledge was established. Four years later, David Brainerd was assigned as a missionary to the Native Americans. New Side Presbyterians were responsible for founding the College of New Jersey (later Princeton University), primarily to train ministers, in 1746. In 1755, the New Side Synod created the Presbytery of Hanover (named for Hanover County, Virginia), which encompassed Virginia and the Carolinas. In addition, the Old Side Synod had one minister located in the South.

By 1758, both sides were ready for reconciliation. Over the years, New Side revivalism had become less radical. At the same time, Old Side Presbyterians were experiencing numerical decline and were eager to share in the New Side's vitality and growth. The two synods merged to become the Synod of New York and Philadelphia. The united Synod required unqualified subscription to the Westminster Confession, but clergy candidates would also be examined for their "experimental acquaintance with religion" (i.e., their personal conversion experiences).

Following America's victory in the Revolutionary War, the Synod of New York and Philadelphia proposed the creation of a national Presbyterian Church in the United States of America. The first General Assembly met in 1789.

==== Covenanters and Seceders ====
Divisions originating in Scotland and Ireland were also duplicated in America, giving rise to Presbyterian denominations not affiliated with either Old Side or New Side synods. Within the Synod of Philadelphia, three ministers had Covenanter sympathies, believing that submission to the National Covenant (1638) and the Solemn League and Covenant (1643) were perpetual obligations. After the Old Side–New Side split, one of these men, Alexander Craighead of Middle Octorara, Pennsylvania, asked Scotland's Reformed Presbytery to send ministers to America (Craighead had already joined the Synod of New York by the time his request was answered). In 1751, the Reformed Presbytery sent John Cuthbertson to serve the Covenanters of Pennsylvania and lay the foundation of the Reformed Presbyterian Church of North America.

Meanwhile, a group of Presbyterians in Pennsylvania was dissatisfied with the Adopting Act, which allowed qualified subscription to the Westminster Confession. They requested ministers from the Anti-Burgher Associate Presbytery in Scotland, who were called "Seceders" because they had broken away from the Church of Scotland during the First Secession of 1733. In 1753, the Associate Presbytery sent Alexander Gellatley and Andrew Arnot to establish congregations and organize a presbytery. The New Side Presbytery of Newcastle denounced the newcomers as schismatics and declared the Associate Presbytery's Marrow doctrine to be unorthodox. A dispute over exclusive psalmody and whether to use Isaac Watts' or Francis Rous's psalter led one congregation to leave the Synod of New York and join the Associate Presbytery.

In 1782, the majority of Associate Presbyterians joined the majority of Reformed Presbyterians to form the Associate Reformed Presbyterian Church, thus uniting most Covenanters and Seceders in America. In 1858, the remaining Associate Presbyterians would merge with part of the Associate Reformed Presbyterian Church to form the United Presbyterian Church of North America.

==== The American Revolution ====
In view of the Presbyterian doctrine of resistance to tyranny, which was inherent in earlier European revolts such as the St. Bartholomew's Day Massacre, the Dutch Revolution, and the English Civil War, British political commentators (Loyalists) viewed the American Revolution as a "Presbyterian Rebellion."

=== Religious revivals ===
Some Presbyterians supported the revivals of the Second and Third Great Awakenings in the nineteenth century, including Lyman Beecher and Charles Grandison Finney. In 1810, a group of pro-revivalist Presbyterians in Kentucky broke away from the mainline Presbyterian Church in the U.S.A. to form the Cumberland Presbyterian Church. In 1837, revivalism was one of the issues that led to the Old School–New School Controversy in the Presbyterian Church in the U.S.A.

The American Presbyterian Mission in India was established in the Indian city of Ludhiana in 1834. The Semicentennial Celebration of the Ludhiana Mission was held there from December 3–7, 1884.

=== Civil War ===
In 1857, as the United States edged closer to civil war, the New School Presbyterians split over slavery, with the Southern New School Presbyterians forming the United Synod of the South. In December 1861, following the outbreak of the Civil War and the Gardiner Spring Resolutions, the Old School Southern Presbyterians, who included men such as James Henley Thornwell and R.L. Dabney, formed the Presbyterian Church in the Confederate States of America. Following the end of the war, the Presbyterian Church in the Confederate States of America renamed itself the Presbyterian Church in the United States.

In 1864, the Old School and New School Southern Presbyterians reunited, with the New School Presbyterians effectively swallowed up by the much larger Old School majority. A reunion of the Old School and New School Presbyterians, despite the protests of Old School Presbyterians such as Charles Hodge, occurred among the mainline Northern Presbyterians in 1869. Unlike in the South, the Old School and New School reunion led the entire denomination to alter its course. By the 1870s, the Presbyterian Church in the U.S.A. began downplaying doctrinal disagreements in the name of ecumenism with other denominations. This resulted in a test of confessional orthodoxy within the denomination, resulting in a heresy trial in 1893 for Charles A. Briggs, a professor of Hebrew at Union Theological Seminary in New York, who questioned the literal inspiration of Scripture. In 1903, the Presbyterian Church in the U.S.A. modified the Westminster Standards to downplay strict Calvinism. One of the results was the reunion of many of the Cumberland Presbyterians with the Presbyterian Church in the U.S.A. in 1906.

=== Fundamentalist–Modernist Controversy ===
In 1909, the Presbytery of New York attempted to ordain a group of men who could not affirm the virgin birth of Jesus, leading to the affirmation of five fundamentals as requirements for ordination: the inspiration and inerrancy of Scripture, the deity of Christ, the virgin birth of Christ, the substitutionary atonement of Christ, and the resurrection. In time, these doctrines were explicated in a series of essays known as The Fundamentals. In 1922, Harry Emerson Fosdick, a Baptist serving as pastor of a Presbyterian church in New York City, delivered a sermon entitled "Shall the Fundamentalists Win?", igniting the Fundamentalist–Modernist Controversy. At Princeton Theological Seminary, New Testament professor J. Gresham Machen, who stood in the tradition of earlier Princetonians such as Charles Hodge and B. B. Warfield, responded with Christianity and Liberalism, which argued that liberalism and Christianity were two different religions. Machen founded Westminster Theological Seminary in 1929 and, following a controversy regarding the establishment of an independent mission board that resulted in his suspension from the ministry in the PCUSA, Machen led an exodus of conservatives in 1936 to form what became known as the Orthodox Presbyterian Church. A group within that body, led by men such as Carl McIntire and J. Oliver Buswell, broke away to form the Bible Presbyterian Church in 1937.

=== 1950s to the present ===
The mainline Northern Presbyterians continued to move away from their traditional Presbyterian past, ordaining women in 1956 and merging with the smaller and more conservative century-old United Presbyterian Church in North America in 1958 to form the United Presbyterian Church in the United States of America in Pittsburgh, Pennsylvania that summer. The UPCUSA, under the leadership of Eugene Carson Blake, the denomination's stated clerk, joined the Presbyterian Church in the United States, the Episcopalians, the United Methodists and the United Church of Christ in meetings of the "Consultation on Church Union" and adopted the Confession of 1967, which had a more neo-orthodox understanding of Scripture and called for a commitment to social action. That same year, the UPCUSA published the Book of Confessions and modified the ordination vows for their ministers. In the 1970s, the trial of Walter Kenyon, a minister who refused to participate in women's ordinations, lead to a ruling that UPCUSA churches must ordain female officers.

In 1942, the Presbyterian Church in the United States began to experiment with confessional revision, prompting PCUS conservatives, such as L. Nelson Bell, father-in-law of Billy Graham, to begin renewal efforts. The PCUS, like its counterparts in the North, began to embrace neo-orthodoxy and liberalism and opened the position of minister to women. In 1955, Rev. J. Vernon McGee, the fundamentalist pastor of the Church of the Open Door in downtown Los Angeles, had a well-publicized break with the Presbyterian Church, in which he claimed the church's "liberal leadership [had] taken over the machinery of the presbytery with a boldness and ruthlessness that is appalling." In 1966, conservatives founded Reformed Theological Seminary in Jackson, Mississippi, to educate students along Old School Presbyterian lines. Following merger discussions with the Presbyterian Church in the U.S.A., in 1956 a proposal was passed by the PCUS General Assembly, but rejected by the presbyteries. Nevertheless, the two denominations collaborated on a hymnal, and in 1970 a Plan of Union was drawn up. Owing to the lack of an escape clause in the Plan of Union for churches that were opposed to the union and to the increasingly liberal views of the denomination, a group of delegates from roughly 200 churches met in Birmingham, Alabama, in December 1973 to form the National Presbyterian Church, later known as the Presbyterian Church in America. In 1981, theological controversy in the UPCUSA, most notably the General Assembly's affirmation of the National Capitol Union Presbytery's reception of a United Church of Christ minister who allegedly denied the deity, sinless nature, and bodily resurrection of Christ, led to the formation of the Evangelical Presbyterian Church, a denomination that puts greater emphasis on its "Essentials of the Faith," a brief statement of evangelical theology, rather than the Westminster Standards. With the strongest conservatives gone from both the UPCUSA and the PCUS, the denominations moved closer to merger and united in 1983 to form the Presbyterian Church (USA).

For the Bible Presbyterians, a disagreement over leadership and the direction of the denomination led to a split in 1957, when the Bible Presbyterian Church–Collingswood Synod, under the control of Carl McIntire, left the Bible Presbyterian Church–Columbus Synod, which in 1961 took the name Evangelical Presbyterian Church. Four years later, the EPC merged with the Reformed Presbyterian Church, General Synod to form the Reformed Presbyterian Church, Evangelical Synod. The RPCES, in turn, would join the Presbyterian Church in America in 1982.

In 1975, the Orthodox Presbyterian Church, the Associate Reformed Presbyterian Church, the Reformed Presbyterian Church in North America, and the Reformed Presbyterian Church Evangelical Synod joined the Christian Reformed Church in North America in forming the North American Presbyterian and Reformed Council (NAPARC), an organization which comprises thirteen confessional Continental Reformed and Presbyterian denominations and federations.

In 1983, the theonomic Reformed Presbyterian Church in the United States was formed as an offshoot from the Presbyterian Church in America. Further splits in the RPCUS led to the creation of the Reformed Presbyterian Church – Hanover Presbytery and the Reformed Presbyterian Church General Assembly. Later, a group from the RPCGA formed the Covenant Presbyterian Church.

In recent years, the debate over homosexuality has caused rifts in the PC (U.S.A.). Following the removal of the bar on homosexual clergy in the PC (U.S.A.) on the denominational level in 2010, many churches left the denomination, joining either the Evangelical Presbyterian Church or the Evangelical Covenant Order of Presbyterians, which became its own denomination in 2012.

Other Presbyterian groups formed recently include the Free Presbyterian Church of North America, which initially operated under the auspices of the Free Presbyterian Church of Ulster until it became a distinct denomination in 2005; the Westminster Presbyterian Church in the United States; and the Communion of Reformed Evangelical Churches, which admits Continental Reformed and Reformed Baptists as well.

Historically, along with Lutherans and Episcopalians, Presbyterians tend to be considerably wealthier and better educated (having more graduate and postgraduate degrees per capita) than most other religious groups in the United States, and are disproportionately represented in the upper reaches of American business, law, and politics.

== Branches ==
Church name	Number of congregations	Notes	North American organization	World organization	Membership
Presbyterian Church (USA)	8705			WCRC	1,045,848
Presbyterian Church in America	1927		NAPARC	WRF	400,751
Cumberland Presbyterian Church	709			WCRC	65,087
Evangelical Presbyterian Church	629			WCRC, WRF	125,870
Korean American Presbyterian Church	650		NAPARC		80,000
Korean Presbyterian Church Abroad	302		NCC	WCRC	55,000
ECO: A Covenant Order of Evangelical Presbyterians	411			WCRC	130,520
Associate Reformed Presbyterian Church	296		NAPARC	WRF	22,459
Orthodox Presbyterian Church	281		NAPARC	ICRC	32,255
Cumberland Presbyterian Church in America	153			WCRC	
Reformed Presbyterian Church of North America	100		NAPARC	ICRC, RPGA	7,076
Evangelical Assembly of Presbyterian Churches in America	73				
Bible Presbyterian Church	33				3,500
Free Presbyterian Church of North America	24				
Christian Presbyterian Church	20				6,000
Covenant Presbyterian Church	13				
Reformed Presbyterian Church – Hanover Presbytery	12				
Upper Cumberland Presbyterian Church	12				
Reformed Presbyterian Church General Assembly	8				
Free Church of Scotland (Continuing)	5	(5 congregations in the U.S.)		ICRC	250
Presbyterian Reformed Church	5	(5 congregations in the U.S.)	NAPARC		100
Covenant Reformed Presbyterian Church	4				
Covenanting Association of Reformed and Presbyterian Churches	3				
Reformed Presbyterian Church in the United States	3				
American Presbyterian Church	2				60
Free Church of Scotland				ICRC	
Korean Presbyterian Church in America	135			ICRC	10,300
Westminster Presbyterian Church in the United States					

== See also ==
- List of Presbyterian churches in the United States
- List of Presbyterian and Reformed denominations in North America
