= North American Presbyterian and Reformed Council =

Christian organization in the U.S. and Canada

- Formation: 1975
- Members: 618,885 (2020-2025)
- Chairman: Rev. L. Anthony Curto
- Website: www.naparc.org

The North American Presbyterian and Reformed Council (NAPARC) is an association of several confessional Presbyterian and Reformed churches in the United States and Canada. The Council meets annually.

It lists biblical inerrancy as its basis, along with the Six Forms of Unity: the Westminster Confession of Faith, the Belgic Confession, the Westminster Larger and Shorter Catechisms, the Heidelberg Catechism, and the Canons of Dordt.

The purpose of NAPARC is to "facilitate cross-denominational conversation and co-operation."

== History and basis ==
The first NAPARC meeting was held in Beaver Falls, Pennsylvania in the fall of 1975, and had the Orthodox Presbyterian Church (OPC), the Christian Reformed Church of North America (CRCNA), the Presbyterian Church in America (PCA), the Reformed Presbyterian Church of North America (RPCNA) and the Reformed Presbyterian Church, Evangelical Synod as its founding members. In time, NAPARC would grow to include 13 Continental Reformed and Presbyterian denominations.

In 1997, the membership of the Christian Reformed Church was suspended, largely on the basis of its 1995 decision to open the offices of elder and minister of word and sacrament to women. Later, in 2001, the denomination was excluded from the organization.

Since 1999, several proposals to transform the NAPARC into a synod that would unify the member denominations have been discussed.

In 2011, the 37th meeting discussed the differences between the organization's member denominations, seeking unity. Discussion of a possible merger between the denominations was encouraged. This was called the Reformed Ecclesiastical Dialogue (RED). However, this project received criticism for giving too much freedom to groups integrated into this possible denomination.

In 2012, Daniel R. Hyde gave a plenary address entitled, "From Reformed Dream to Reformed Reality: The Problem and Possibility of Reformed Church Unity." This led to another debate about unity among the denominations occurred. Again the plan was criticized by some leaders, but encouraged by others. It has been proposed that the union of churches is ideal, but it may be that the current churches are not yet prepared for it.

In 2019, a representative of the Associate Reformed Presbyterian Church asked "What is the current stance within NAPARC on organic union?".

In 2025 the official NAPARC press release stated,

"In observance of the 50th anniversary of NAPARC, an open discussion was held regarding the objective of organic union, evaluating past efforts and commenting on the prospects of organic union in the future.The discussion revealed that all were thankful for the many ways NAPARC has fostered cooperation with one another in many areas, but few were hopeful of organic union in the foreseeable future, as defined by NAPARC. Some commented that if such unions between Member Churches were to occur, they must come from the bottom up, not imposed from the top down, noting that some church union efforts in the broader church have been destructive of both the Gospel and church unity and have weakened theological foundations through compromise. Nevertheless, the assembly was encouraged to continue to be “eager to maintain the unity of the Spirit in the bond of peace” (Ephesians 4:3). Since the Spirit has made us one, it is needful to strive, regardless of how difficult, to establish a bond of peace which is a bond of reconciliation – a bond that seeks to remove all sinful causes of division between Christians and churches"

== Purpose and function ==
The Constitution of NAPARC states that the Basis of the Council is "Confessing Jesus Christ as only Savior and Sovereign Lord over all of life, we affirm the basis of the fellowship of Presbyterian and Reformed Churches to be full commitment to the Bible in its entirety as the Word of God written, without error in all its parts and to its teaching as set forth in the Heidelberg Catechism, the Belgic Confession, the Canons of Dordt, the Westminster Confession of Faith, and the Westminster Larger and Shorter Catechisms. That the adopted basis of fellowship be regarded as warrant for the establishment of a formal relationship of the nature of a council, that is, a fellowship that enables the constituent churches to advise, counsel, and cooperate in various matters with one another and hold out before each other the desirability and need for organic union of churches that are of like faith and practice."

The objectives of the organization are:

- Facilitate discussion and consultation between member bodies on those issues and problems which divide them as well as on those which they face in common and by the sharing of insights "communicate advantages to one another" (Institutes IV, 2,1).
- Promote the appointment of joint committees to study matters of common interest and concern.
- Exercise mutual concern in the perpetuation, retention, and propagation of the Reformed faith.
- Promote co-operation wherever possible and feasible on the local and denominational level in such areas as missions, relief efforts, Christian schools, and church education.

== Possible member mergers ==
In 1982, the Presbyterian Church in America and the Reformed Presbyterian Church, Evangelical Synod, two of the founding members of the NAPARC, merged. Since then, the NAPARC routinely debate on new proposals for the unification of denominations.

In 2008, United Reformed Churches in North America absorbed Orthodox Christian Reformed Churches in North America.

=== Canadian and American Reformed Churches and United Reformed Churches in North America ===
The Canadian and American Reformed Churches and the United Reformed Churches in North America have been in dialogue about a possible merger since the 2010s. In 2016, the two denominations held simultaneous synods, in the same location.

=== Associate Reformed Presbyterian Church and Reformed Presbyterian Church of North America ===
The Associate Reformed Presbyterian Church was formed by the union of two Presbyterian groups, which included most of the members of the Reformed Presbyterian Church of North America, in 1782.

After the establishment of the NAPARC, the two denominations established a relationship. In 2015 and 2019, the two denominations held simultaneous synods in the same location and some members questioned the possibility of a future merger.

=== Free Reformed Churches of North America and Heritage Reformed Congregations ===
The Free Reformed Churches of North America and Heritage Reformed Congregations have operated a seminary together since 1995 and are in dialogue about a possible merger. In 2017, they held simultaneous synods, in the same location.

=== Presbyterian Church in America and Orthodox Presbyterian Church ===
The Presbyterian Church in America and Orthodox Presbyterian Church attempted, in 1956 and in 1972, denominational merger. However, in each of the attempts, the merger was not approved by the necessary quorum in the respective assemblies of one of the denominations.

== Member denominations ==
Denomination	Number of congregations	Number of members	Refs
Associate Reformed Presbyterian Church	260	25,692	(2023)
Canadian and American Reformed Churches	76	20,079	(2024)
L'Église réformée du Québec (ERQ) ("Reformed Church of Quebec" (RCQ) in English)	5	265	(2024)
Free Reformed Churches of North America	23	5,505	(2023)
Heritage Reformed Congregations	10	2,186	(2022)
Korean American Presbyterian Church	650	80,000	(2023)
Korean Presbyterian Church in America (Kosin)	135	10,300	(2015)
Orthodox Presbyterian Church	341	33,566	(2024)
Presbyterian Church in America	1,959	405,634	(2025)
Presbyterian Reformed Church	7	226	(2018)
Reformed Church in the United States	45	3,438	(2025)
Reformed Presbyterian Church of North America	85	6,990	(2023)
United Reformed Churches in North America	140	25,004	(2023)
Total	3,736	618,885	(2020-2025)

== Observer denominations ==
Denomination	Number of congregations	Number of Members
Protestant Reformed Churches in America	33	8,716
Bible Presbyterian Church	27	3,528
Reformed Presbyterian Church of Canada	-	-
Associate Reformed Presbyterian Church in Canada	-	-
