= Reformed Churches in Brazil =

The Reformed Churches in Brazil (Igrejas Reformadas do Brasil in Portuguese) is a federation of confessional Reformed churches in northeastern Brazil, started by Canadian and Dutch missionaries in the 1970s.

== Origin ==
The Canadian and American Reformed Churches began missionary work in the villages between Recife and Maceio in 1970. In the same year Dutch Reformed Churches began missions in Paraná. These efforts led the formation of 2 churches in Alagoas and Pernambuco. The American missionaries are supported by two Brazilian Presbyterian students. The Canadian Reformed Church in Surrey, British Columbia was responsible for this work in Brazil. A school in Maceio was organised by the Reformed Church.

Other churches joined the federation from Dutch Reformed (in Colombo), baptist (Esperanca Church was formerly baptist) and Pentecostal origin ( the church in Cabro Frio was Pentecostal). The denomination has an official theological seminary, the John Calvin Institution (Institutio Joao Calvino) and offers Bachelor of Divinity to train national pastors, elders and deacons. From its beginning from a few congregations the denomination has congregations in several Brazilian cities and states.

== Doctrine ==
=== Creeds ===
- Apostles Creed
- Nicene Creed
- Athanasius Creed

=== Confessions ===
- Heidelberg Catechism
- Belgic Confession
- Canons of Dort

== Churches ==
Congregations are in:

- Alagoas:
  - Reformed Church in Maceio
  - Reformed Church in Maragogi
- Ceará:
  - Reformed Church in Fortaleza
- Minas:
  - Reformed Church in Unai
- Paraíba:
  - Reformed Church in Esperanca
- Paraná:
  - Reformed Church in Colombo
- Pernambuco:
  - Reformed Church in San Jose
  - Reformed Church in Recife
  - Reformed Church in Caruaru
  - Reformed Church in Prazeres
  - Reformed Church in Veracruz
  - Reformed Church in Paulista
- Rio de Janeiro:
  - Reformed Church in Cabro Frio

== Interchurch organisations ==
Igrejas Reformadas do Brasil has a sisterchurch relationship with the Canadian and American Reformed Churches. It is also a member of the International Conference of Reformed Churches.
