= OCRC =

OCRC may refer to:

- Central Office for the Repression of Corruption (French: Office central pour la répression de la corruption), a unit of the Federal Police (Belgium)
- Ohio Civil Rights Commission
- Ontario Cannabis Retail Corporation
- Orthodox Christian Reformed Churches in North America
