= Free Reformed Churches of North America =

Christian denomination

- Classification: Protestant
- Orientation: Reformed
- Polity: Presbyterian
- Associations: North American Presbyterian and Reformed Council
- Origin: 1950s
- Branched from: Christian Reformed Churches of the Netherlands CGKN
- Congregations: 19 (2012) and 2 church plants
- Members: 4689 (2012)
- Seminaries: Puritan Reformed Theological Seminary

The Free Reformed Churches of North America (FRCNA) is a theologically conservative federation of churches in the Dutch Calvinist tradition with congregations in the United States and Canada. It officially adopted its current name in 1974.

These churches together confess the Bible to be the Word of God and believe it is faithfully summarized by the Belgic Confession, Heidelberg Catechism, and Canons of Dort. This denomination adheres to the five points of Calvinism. It is affiliated with the Christian Reformed Churches in the Netherlands (Christelijke Gereformeerde Kerken).

Despite similar naming styles, the Free Reformed Churches of North America should not be confused with the Free Reformed Churches of Australia or Free Reformed Churches of South Africa.

== Basic beliefs and doctrines ==
=== Church ===
The Free Reformed Churches see the church as a community of people who believe in Jesus Christ. They believe that the church is a divine institution, for three reasons:

1. It is made up of God's people.
2. It is the body of Christ.
3. It is the temple of the Holy Spirit and is guided by His teaching.

Its members believe the true Church is recognized by the "pure preaching of God's Word." This preaching is the proclamation of the whole Word of God (the Bible), the attributes of God the Creator, the sin which humanity has fallen into, the redemption accomplished by Jesus Christ, and the work of the Holy Spirit in both bringing sinners to salvation and sanctifying them in this life.

=== Baptism ===
The Free Reformed Churches hold to both adult and infant baptism, believing that the Bible teaches that children born of believing parents are set apart by God and therefore members of His covenant of grace. However, being in the covenant still carries with it the necessity for every person to be born again, which is a promise given that needs to be prayed for, and asked fulfillment of, from God.

=== Pastoral education ===
Theological students from the FRCNA attend Puritan Reformed Theological Seminary in Grand Rapids, Michigan. Puritan Reformed opened in 1995 and offers masters' and doctoral degrees.

== Creeds ==
=== Three Forms of Unity ===
The FRCNA fully subscribe to the Three Forms of Unity, believing that while these three historic Reformed creeds are not inspired by God, they do agree with, and are a faithful summary of the Word of God in all respects:

- Belgic Confession of Faith (1561)
- Heidelberg Catechism (1563)
- Canons of Dort (1618/19)

=== Early Christian Church creeds ===
The FRCNA also fully subscribe to the three creeds of the early Christian church:

- Apostles' Creed (+-150 AD)
- Nicene Creed (381 AD)
- Athanasian Creed (500 AD)

== Publications ==
Free Reformed Publications publishes and prints various books, magazines, and articles on behalf of the FRCNA. These include:

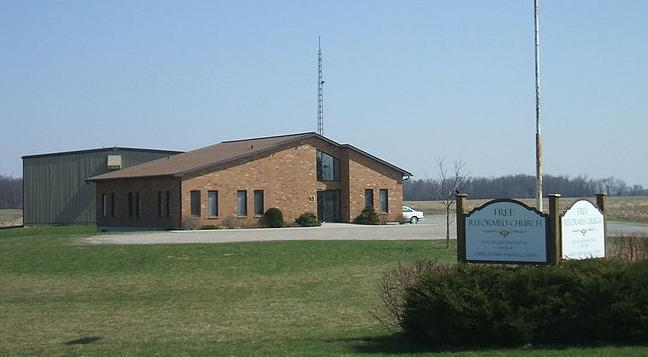
The Free Reformed Church of Bornholm, Ontario.

=== Magazines and articles ===
- "The Messenger". Free Reformed Churches of North America. The Messenger, the official monthly publication of the denomination
- The Youth Messenger
- Open Windows (a Christian children's magazine)
- Banner of Truth Radio Ministry (evangelistic radio broadcasts)

=== Books ===
- Cornelis (Neil) Pronk, Expository Sermons on the Canons of Dort, 1999.
- Cornelis (Neil) Pronk, Faith of Our Fathers: Studies in the Doctrines of Grace.
- David H. Kranendonk, ed., Voices From Our Heritage, 2005.
- Gerald R. Procee, Holy Baptism: The Scriptural Setting, Significance and Scope of Infant Baptism, 1998.
- Andrew Van Der Veer, Bible Lessons for Juniors, 4 vols., 2007. (co-published with Reformation Heritage Books)
- Their Lives & Your Life: Children's Devotions on Bible Characters, 2007. (co-published with Reformation Heritage Books)

== See also ==
- Puritan Reformed Theological Seminary
