= Canadian and American Reformed Churches =

North American federation of Christian churches

- Classification: Protestant
- Orientation: Continental Dutch Reformed (Dolerenden)
- Theology: Confessional (Three Forms) Reformed
- Governance: Presbyterian
- Associations: International Conference of Reformed Churches, North American Presbyterian and Reformed Council
- Origin: 16 April 1950; Lethbridge, Alberta (Canada)
- Branched from: Reformed Churches in the Netherlands (Liberated)
- Congregations: 70 (2023)
- Members: 19,494 (2018)
- Official website: canrc.org

The Canadian and American Reformed Churches (CanRC) is a federation of Protestant Reformed (Calvinist) churches in Canada and the United States, with historical roots in the Reformed Churches of the Netherlands.

== Basic beliefs and doctrine ==
CanRC churches believe in the full sovereignty of God and in Biblical infallibility. The basis of the preaching and teaching in these churches is the belief that Jesus Christ is both truly God and truly human, and is the long-awaited Messiah who suffered and died for the sins of God's people, and that this demands a thankful response of faith and obedience. Like many other Reformed churches, they teach that salvation is by grace through faith in Jesus Christ alone. They broadly follow Reformed theology, and have adopted the Three Forms of Unity, which are Reformed confessions.

When a member of the church public states their faith in Jesus, they are understood to subscribe to the confessions of the church as faithfully summarizing the doctrine of the Bible. Profession of faith also confirms their status as communicant members, subject to a process of church discipline, up to and including excommunication if they are considered delinquent in doctrine or lifestyle. This is ascertained by other members and by the elders through yearly home visits.

== History ==
CanRC was founded by members of the Reformed Churches in the Netherlands (Liberated) (GKV) who immigrated to Canada following World War II. These Dutch immigrants first made contact with already-existing Reformed churches in Canada, especially the Protestant Reformed Churches in America (PRC) and the Christian Reformed Church in North America (CRCNA), in the hope that they could join with them. This was deemed impossible due to theological differences with the PRC, and the CRCNA's sympathy with the Reformed Churches in the Netherlands, which had expelled the GKV in 1944 over a disagreement regarding Abraham Kuyper's view of the covenant.

The Canadian Reformed Churches maintained ecumenical relations with the GKV until tension between the two churches led to an official termination of their relationship by the General Synod of the Canadian Reformed Churches in 2019. Reasons for this decision included disapproval of the GKV's hermeneutics, as well as the GKV's more accepting views regarding women in office, common law couples, and homosexual members.

The first Canadian Reformed congregation was instituted in Lethbridge, Alberta, on April 16, 1950. The same year, churches were instituted in Edmonton and Neerlandia, Alberta; Orangeville, Ontario; and New Westminster, British Columbia. As of 2023, there are 70 congregations, which can be found in British Columbia, Alberta, Manitoba and Ontario, as well as in the American states of Washington, Michigan and Colorado.

== Church government ==
Under the assertion that the government of the church must be regulated by the Bible, the Canadian Reformed Churches practice what they call a traditionally Reformed "bottom-up" polity, as opposed to a "top-down" model of church government. This approach to church polity reflects their European Reformed roots and it is used to be both anti-hierarchical and anti-independent, promoting both the autonomy of the local church and the need to cooperate within a federation.

Only male members who have made profession of faith and meet the conditions as set forth in certain Biblical passages (such as 1 Timothy 3 and Titus 1) are eligible for office as pastors, elders, and deacons. Women are not eligible for office.

The government of the Canadian Reformed Churches is based on the Church Order adopted by the Synod of Dort (1618–1619). The Canadian Reformed Churches have revised the Church Order to reflect changed circumstances, and to incorporate minor improvements. The revised Church Order follows the principles and structure of the Church Order of Dort.

The Church Order contains 76 Articles which are divided into four sections dealing with:

- the offices and supervision of doctrine (ministers, missionaries, elders, deacons)
- the assemblies of the church (consistory, classis, regional synod, general synod)
- the liturgy of the church (worship services, sacraments, ceremonies)
- the discipline of the church

The federation is divided first by local consistories, then into eight classical regions, next with two annual regional synods, and finally a general synod. General synod takes place every three years.

== Missions ==
=== Foreign missions ===
All of the churches are also involved, either directly or indirectly, in the work of foreign mission. The Cornerstone Church of Hamilton, Ontario has sent a missionary working in northern Brazil. The church of Aldergrove, British Columbia, has sent two missionaries working in northern Brazil. The Bethel Church of Toronto has sent two missionaries in Papua New Guinea. The church of Smithville, Ontario, has sent a missionary in West Timor, Indonesia.

=== Canadian missions ===
The church at Smithers, BC has started a program of outreach among the First Nations people living in the Bulkley Valley region of northern British Columbia. Local outreach involved Sunday schools, teen activities, and Bible camps. Smithers Home Mission also sent a missionary to work in Prince George, B.C., the largest urban centre in Northern British Columbia.

Many churches also support a radio program called The Voice of the Church.

== Ecumenical relations ==
The Canadian Reformed Churches also have "ecclesiastical fellowship" with a number of Reformed and Presbyterian church federations, including the following:

The Americas:

- United Reformed Churches in North America
- Reformed Church in the United States
- Orthodox Presbyterian Church
- L'Église réformée du Québec
- Igrejas Reformadas do Brasil

Abroad:

- Free Reformed Churches of South Africa
- Free Reformed Churches of Australia
- Reformed Churches of New Zealand
- Presbyterian Church in Korea (Koshin)
- Free Church of Scotland
- Free Church of Scotland (continuing)
- Reformed Churches in Indonesia (GGRI)
- Calvinist Reformed Churches in Indonesia (GGRC)

The ecclesiastical fellowships involve accepting each other's members as their own, inviting delegates to each other's assemblies or synods, allowing each other's ministers to preach in church, keeping each other informed about major ecclesiastical decisions and relations with other parties, and generally helping each other remain true to the Reformed faith.

== Education ==
The Federation believes that a thorough theological education must be maintained by the churches and for the churches. As such, it operates three colleges;

The Canadian Reformed Theological Seminary, located in Hamilton, Ontario.

The Covenant Canadian Reformed Teachers College, an unaccredited college located in Hamilton, Ontario, was established in 1981 to train Christian teachers to serve in the field of education. The Canadian Reformed Teachers College Association is formed with representatives from Ontario, Manitoba, Alberta, and British Columbia school societies serving as a Board of Governors. By 2022, the CCRTC had graduated 250 students, many of whom are currently employed by Canadian Reformed schools across Canada.

The Reformed Bible College is also run by CanRC. It runs short online courses on specific Bible books and topics.

Although separate from the denomination, parents within the federation have organized a number of privately funded schools at the elementary and secondary levels across the country. In 2022, there were twenty-eight schools affiliated with the CanRC, including sixteen elementary schools, three high schools, and nine kindergarten-to-grade 12 schools.

== Care ==
CanRC also runs five care homes, one in British Columbia and the rest in Ontario.
