= Bonclarken =

Coordinates: 35.2777°N 82.4365°W

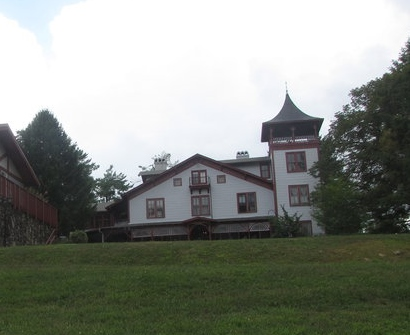
- The Heidelberg House
- Interactive map of the Bonclarken area

General information
- Location: Flat Rock, Henderson County, North Carolina
- Opened: 1921

Website
- www.bonclarken.org

Bonclarken is a conference center located in Flat Rock, North Carolina (between Asheville, North Carolina and Greenville, South Carolina) operated by the Associate Reformed Presbyterian Church (ARP). Bonclarken is the conference center of the Associate Reformed Presbyterian Church. The Associate Reformed Presbyterian Church is a conservative evangelical Christian denomination that traces its roots to the Reformation, particularly the work of John Calvin and John Knox. It is used to accommodate guests of 500 people during the summer and 400 people during the winter. Bonclarken has two fully equipped kitchens and conference centers that can hold up to 1200 people in their meeting centers.

Purchased in 1921 by the ARP, Bonclarken is used for Christian education, and hosts activities for youth and adults alike. There is also a chapel on the campus for worship services whenever groups or churches have special services there. The chapel is also where the ARP Church conducts most of its annual General Synod business.

== History ==
The Associate Reformed Presbyterian Church began holding a summer Bible conference in Gastonia, North Carolina in 1915. The conference was very popular and well attended. However, in 1920, the conference planners learned the facility hosting the conference was to be sold. Efforts to buy the facility were unsuccessful, so a new meeting location was needed.

Looking for a location with cooler summer temperatures, the mountains of western North Carolina were selected to begin the search. God's providence led a realtor in Hendersonville to suggest a particular location: a beautiful sixty-three-acre estate, containing a massive home and the Heidelberg Gardens, for sale in Flat Rock. The location was perfect for the conference and was purchased on August 31, 1921.

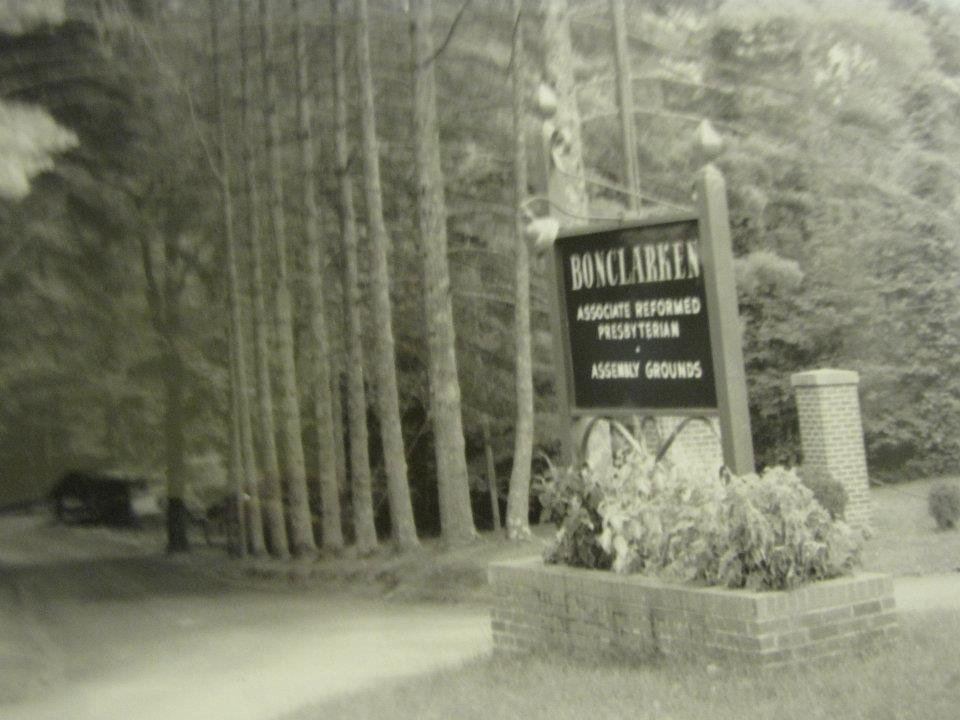
Old Bonclarken Sign off Greenville Hwy.

== Meaning of name ==
After the Associate Reformed Presbyterian Church purchased the property from Dr. Arthur Guerard in 1921, a contest was held among members of the Church to find a suitable name for what was to become the denomination's retreat center. Sallie Miller Brice of Chester, South Carolina, offered the following:

"I submit a name for our Assembly Grounds. It is Bon-clar-ken, and it has this meaning, Bon from the Latin, Bonus – 'good', clar from the Latin clarus – 'clear', ken from the Scotch – 'vision'. Bon-clar-ken – Good-clear-vision."

== Mission ==
Bonclarken's mission is "to provide and promote a Christian environment for inspiration and renewal, worship, education, fellowship, and recreation by the power of the Holy Spirit." Bonclarken is an ideal place for churches to go to retreats and camps. During such retreats and camps, students have opportunities to fellowship with fellow believers from all across the Eastern United States. Activities held at White Oak Lake, the YAB, and numerous other facilities allow students to make lasting friendships in a welcoming environment.
