= Presbyterian Church in Japan =

- Classification: Protestant
- Orientation: Conservative Calvinist
- Theology: Reformed, Evangelical
- Governance: Presbyterian
- Associations: Japan Evangelical Association
- Region: Japan
- Origin: 1993; Japan
- Branched from: Presbyterian Church in America
- Merger of: Christian Reformed Church in Japan and the Evangelical Presbyterian Church in Japan
- Congregations: 73
- Members: 2000–3000

The Presbyterian Church in Japan is a conservative Reformed denomination in Japan, founded by American missionaries in the mid-1900s.

== History ==
In the years after World War II, Japanese missionaries and the forerunner of the Presbyterian Church in America evangelists created what is today the Presbyterian Church in Japan.

The denomination is a merger of two Presbyterian denominations in Japan. The Christian Presbyterian Church in Japan founded in 1956 and the Evangelical Presbyterian Church in Japan founded in 1979 began collaborating in 1980, and united in 1993. The Independent Board for Presbyterian Foreign Missions of planted some churches after the Second World War, and helped establish a seminary. This became the Evangelical Presbyterian Church in Japan. When the PCA merged with the Reformed Presbyterian Church, Evangelical Synod the missionaries began to assist the PCJ.

The church had 50 congregations and 2,000 members in 3 Presbyteries in 2004. The Westminster Confession of Faith is the official confession.

As of 2025 the denomination has 67 congregations in 15 Prefectures, in Yamagata Prefecture, Ibaraki Prefecture, Saitama Prefecture, Chiba Prefecture, Tokyo Prefecture, Kanagawa Prefecture, Yamanashi Prefecture, Aichi Prefecture, Mie Prefecture, Ishikawa Prefecture, Osaka Prefecture, Kagawa Prefecture, Miyagi Prefecture, Tokushima Prefecture, and Nara Prefecture.

There are church planting movements in several Japanese cities, including Nagoya, Chiba, Osaka and Tokyo.

== Theology ==
- Westminster Confession of Faith
- Westminster Shorter Catechism
- Westminster Larger Catechism

== Seminary ==
The church maintains theological training at two institutes, which share the same building in Nagoya:

- Christ Bible Institute
- Christ Bible Seminary.

== Statistics ==
The Presbyterian Church in Japan has now 6 Presbyteries and 2,200 regularly worshiping members in 67 congregations. The six Presbyteries are Tokyo, Central, Western, Dongguan Higashikana, Musashi and Kanagawa Presbyteries. The church is among the few Christian denominations that are growing in Japan. While other missions are shrinking, the PCA mission of the Japanese Presbyterian Church is growing rapidly. The PCA supports the Christ Bible Institute and the Church planting Institute. The Presbyterian Church in America supports short-term missionaries for over 27 years.

== Partner churches ==
The PCJ partners with the Presbyterian Church in America and the Presbyterian Church of Australia. These denominations aim to plant churches and form presbytery in Chiba Prefecture. In 1989, 3 pastors in the Presbyterian Church in Japan invited the PCA missionaries to serve in Japan to build a presbytery. The Presbyterian Church in Japan is among the few denominations that are growing in the country.

The church maintains close relationships also with the Orthodox Presbyterian Church (USA) and the Presbyterian Church in Korea (Koshin).
