= Reformed Church in the United States (Eureka Classis) =

Calvinist denomination

- Abbreviation: RCUS
- Classification: Protestant
- Orientation: German Reformed
- Theology: Confessional
- Polity: Presbyterian
- Associations: NAPARC, ICRC
- Origin: 1725 (RCUS), 1911 (Classis)
- Branched from: Reformed Church in the United States
- Congregations: 47
- Members: 3340
- Other name: Eureka Classis
- Official website: rcus.org
- Minutes of the 277th RCUS Synod 2023

The Reformed Church in the United States (RCUS) is a conservative Protestant denomination. Before 1986, it was known as the Eureka Classis, originally a subset of the historic denomination of the same name, centered around Eureka, South Dakota. The Classis was primarily composed of late 19th-century Volga German immigrants, and it became a continuing, independent denomination after refusing to participate in a 1934 national church merger. The RCUS has membership concentrated in the Midwest and California.

== Origins ==
From 1870 until about 1902, America had a wave of German immigrants. These Germans came from the South of Russia where their ancestors had moved at the invitation of Catherine the Great. Many of these immigrants ended up in the Dakotas. At this time, the Reformed Church in the United States was also known as the German Reformed Church, so it was a logical denomination for the Reformed German-Russians to join. The RCUS at this time was in great turmoil on account of Mercersburg theology and the liturgical controversy that arose out of that. The German-Russians were against the innovations of Mercersburg. Since these immigrants still spoke German as their primary language, they used a clause in the Constitution of the RCUS to organize based on language rather than the tradition geography, yet, the real reason was to organize doctrinally.

On June 7, 1911, seven ministers and sixteen congregations organized to form the Eureka Classis. The name of the Classis came from the Greek word ‘eureka’ which means ‘I found it’ and not on the town Eureka, South Dakota, where the second meeting of the Classis would be held. The name was designed to mean that they had found a solution to their doctrinal problems with the rest of the denomination.

As the RCUS had talks with the Evangelical Synod of North America, the Eureka Classis protested. It opposed the union of the two churches officially in 1932. The Eureka Classis voted against the proposed constitution of the new church in 1936. In 1940, when the merger became official and the Evangelical and Reformed Church was formed (E&R), the Eureka Classis resolved to be the continuing RCUS. The Eureka Classis incorporated as the continuing Reformed Church in the United States in 1945 in the state of North Dakota. The Classis at that time consisted of ten pastors and twenty-eight churches.

== Westminster Period 1953 to 1970 ==
The Eureka Classis had always been short on ministers. The problem had gotten worse after the split with the E&R as now there was not a seminary that could be trusted to send young men to be trained for the ministry. Two of the leading ministers in the Eureka Classis, Rev. Walter Grossmann and Rev. William Korn, began encouraging people to attend Westminster Theological Seminary in Philadelphia. In 1953, Lloyd Gross enrolled at Westminster and the Eureka Classis began a fruitful relationship with the seminary. Westminster not only trained young men from the RCUS, but sent other graduating students into the Eureka Classis to fill pulpits. Rev. Norman Hoeflinger was one such man and he became the first graduate of Westminster to serve in the Eureka Classis. This relationship with Westminster brought about a relationship with the Orthodox Presbyterian Church (OPC). Contact with non-German Calvinist churches helped open the mindset of the Eureka Classis to the outside world and the possibility of growth. In 1960, the Eureka Classis helped fund Harvey Conn of the OPC as a missionary. Also that year, the church saw statistics of fourteen pastors and twenty congregations. Of that number at least five were Westminster graduates, and one was a transfer from the Orthodox Presbyterian Church. The relationship with Westminster ended in the early 70s as the controversy around Rev. Norman Shepherd, professor at Westminster, caused the RCUS pull away from Westminster Seminary. The Eureka Classis would consider many alternatives to Westminster such as Mid-America Reformed Seminary as well as considering starting their own seminary.

== Final Years 1970-1985 ==
The Eureka Classis started to not only fund foreign missions, but began to get serious about home missions as well. The Eureka Classis began outreach to churches and groups that were not from the German Calvinist heritage. The Eureka Classis in 1970 had 22 ministers and 23 congregations. By 1985, the Classis had grown to 32 congregations and 30 ministers. In 1985 the Classis voted to dissolve at their next meeting into four classes and form a Synod of the Reformed Church in the United States. The number of churches and the fact that the RCUS now reached from California to Florida aided that decision. A new constitution was approved, and in 1986, the Eureka Classis convened and dissolved into the Synod of the Reformed Church in the United States.

== Polity and beliefs ==
The polity of the RCUS is presbyterian; local congregations elect elders and deacons for guidance. The pastor is the presiding officer of the church council or consistory. The RCUS has around 43 congregations, with about 2,500 communicant members throughout the United States. The congregations are grouped together in four classes: Western Classis, Northern Plains Classis, South Central Classis, Covenant Eastern Classis. A classis is equivalent to a presbytery in Scots-Anglo-Irish Presbyterian denominations. A general, or national, synod convenes annually in mid-spring.

== Theology ==
The old RCUS, as well as the continuing RCUS, originally held only to the Heidelberg Catechism as its statement of faith. In 1995, the Synod officially adopted the Belgic Confession of Faith and the Canons of Dort, which along with Heidelberg are known as the Three Forms of Unity which are commonly used together by Reformed churches (especially those coming out of the Dutch branch of Reformed churches). By holding strictly to these standards, the RCUS maintains a strong affiliation with Calvinism and the 16th-century Reformation.

The RCUS believes in Biblical inerrancy, including a teaching that Genesis 1:1—2:4 must be understood as a literal 24-hour, six-day creation account. The RCUS also does not allow women to hold special office (elders, deacons, pastor), a stance held by many conservative Reformed or Presbyterian bodies in the United States. In addition, the RCUS rejects some standard positions associated with American fundamentalism such as premillennialism and total abstinence from alcoholic beverages, holding instead a focus on a European Calvinist orthodoxy rather than American-style revivalism.

== International organisations ==
The Reformed Church in the United States is a member of the North American Presbyterian and Reformed Council as well as the International Conference of Reformed Churches.

== See also ==
Official RCUS Website You Shall Be My People by R. Grossmann and N. Hoeflinger
