= Presbyterian Reformed Church of Mexico =

The Presbyterian Reformed Church of Mexico (Spanish: Iglesia Presbiteriana Reformada de México) is a Protestant Christian church that formed after the Independent Presbyterian Church of Mexico split in the 1980s. The church has a relationship with the U.S.-based Christian Reformed Church in North America, which sends missionaries to the Mexico City area and other states. It is a member of the World Communion of Reformed Churches.

== Origin ==
In 1947, the Independent Presbyterian Church of Mexico (IPCM) broke from the National Presbyterian Church in Mexico. Another split occurred after the IPCM's governing council (Synod) voted in 1983 to discontinue its relationship with the Christian Reformed Church in North America (CRCNA). The following year, two regional organizations (presbyteries) decided to maintain ties with the CRCNA, and in 1992 they renamed themselves the Presbyterian Reformed Church of Mexico.

== Theology and organization ==
The church follows:

- Three Forms of Unity
- Westminster Confession of Faith

The church operates the John Calvin Theological Seminary and a Bible Institute in Mexico City.

There are more than 100 churches and 26,000 members in Mexico (as of 2004), divided into eight presbyteries: Barnabas, Bethel, Central, Ebenezer, Ch'ol, Emanuel, Northern, and Zacil-Be.
