= Orthodox Christian Reformed Churches in North America =

- Abbreviation: OCRC
- Classification: Protestant
- Orientation: Continental Dutch Reformed
- Theology: Confessional Reformed
- Region: Canada and United States
- Origin: 1988
- Separated from: Christian Reformed Church in North America
- Merged into: United Reformed Churches in North America (2008)

The Orthodox Christian Reformed Churches (OCRC) were a theologically conservative federation of churches in the Dutch Reformed tradition in Canada and the United States. OCRC doctrine confessed the Bible to be the Word of God and believe it is faithfully summarized by the Belgic Confession, Heidelberg Catechism, and Canons of Dort. The OCRC was absorbed into the United Reformed Churches in North America in 2008.

== History ==
The first Orthodox Christian Reformed Church was organized in Listowel, Ontario, in 1979 by families who had left the Christian Reformed Church for doctrinal reasons, especially its Report 44. Rev. Harry Van Dyken was very active in the formation of the federation and founding churches. Congregations also formed in Allendale, Michigan (1979 or 1980); Burlington, Washington (1980); and Toronto, Ontario (1980).

Representatives of these churches began meeting in 1981 to discuss church order and federation. The Orthodox Christian Reformed Churches formally federated in March 1988 with seven congregations. In addition to the four mentioned above, there were congregations in Bowmanville, Ontario (1982); Cambridge, Ontario (1984); and Ripon, California (1985). At its peak about 1995 the federation numbered fifteen churches in two classes, Classis East and Classis West. Almost all the new churches were in the West.

The OCRC federation had two decades of stability and then a decade of decline. In 2004 the Listowel congregation joined the Protestant Reformed Churches in America.

OCRC synod voted in August 2008 to join the United Reformed Churches in North America.

== Beliefs ==
The Orthodox Christian Reformed Churches believed in the Bible as the inerrant Word of God and the only rule of faith and practice.

=== Confessions ===
These are also called the Three Forms of Unity.

- Belgic Confession of Faith, 1561
- Heidelberg Catechism, 1563
- Canons of Dort, 1618–1619

=== Creeds ===
These are sometimes known as the Ecumenical Creeds.

- Apostles' Creed, circa 150
- Nicene Creed, 381
- Athanasian Creed, 500
