= Orthodox Presbyterian Church =

Confessional Presbyterian denomination located primarily in the United States

- Abbreviation: OPC
- Classification: Protestant
- Orientation: Presbyterianism
- Theology: Confessional (Westminster) Reformed
- Polity: Presbyterian
- Moderator: Everett A. Henes
- Ecclesiastical fellowship: RCUS (since 1954); ARPC (since 1977); PCA (since 1988); CanRC (since 2001); URCNA (since 2008); ERQ (since 2011); RPCNA (since 2014); BPC (since 2017)
- Associations: North American Presbyterian and Reformed Council, International Conference of Reformed Churches
- Region: North America
- Headquarters: Willow Grove, Pennsylvania
- Origin: June 11, 1936; Philadelphia, Pennsylvania
- Separated from: Presbyterian Church in the United States of America
- Separations: Bible Presbyterian Church (1937)
- Congregations: 300 (2024)
- Members: 33,941 (2025)
- Ministers: 601 (2025)
- Other name: Presbyterian Church of America (1936–1939)
- Official website: www.opc.org

The Orthodox Presbyterian Church (OPC) is a confessional Presbyterian denomination located primarily in the United States, with additional congregations in Canada, Bermuda, and Puerto Rico. It was founded by conservative members of the Presbyterian Church in the United States of America (PCUSA), who objected to the rise of Liberal and Modernist theology in the 1930s. The OPC is considered to have had an influence on evangelicalism far beyond its size.

== History ==
The Orthodox Presbyterian Church was founded in 1936, largely through the work of John Gresham Machen. Machen, who, prior to this time was a PCUSA minister, had a longstanding distrust of liberalism in Christianity, as typified by the Auburn Affirmation. He and others founded Westminster Theological Seminary in 1929 in response to rising liberal sentiments at Princeton Theological Seminary, and in 1933, Machen formed the Independent Board for Presbyterian Foreign Missions, due to his concerns around tolerance of liberal theology on the PCUSA mission field.

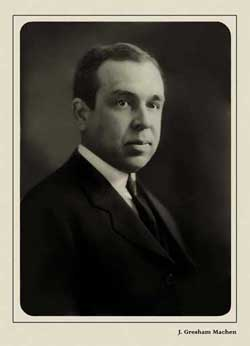
J. Gresham Machen was instrumental in founding the Orthodox Presbyterian Church.

Machen's views were met with opposition. In 1935, the PCUSA General Assembly declared Machen's Independent Board unconstitutional, and gave the associated clergy an ultimatum to break their ties with it. When Machen and seven other clergy did not disavow the Independent Board, they were suspended from PCUSA ministry.

In light of these events, Machen and a group of likeminded ministers, elders, and laymen met in Philadelphia on June 11, 1936, to form what they then called the Presbyterian Church of America (not to be confused with the Presbyterian Church in America, or PCA, which formed in 1973), with Machen as the first moderator. Other key figures at this time include Ned B. Stonehouse, J. Oliver Buswell, and Edward Joseph Young.

Machen died shortly thereafter in January 1937. Later that year, a faction led by Carl McIntire broke away to form Bible Presbyterian Church, affirming total abstinence from alcohol and premillennialism.

In 1939, after PCUSA filed a lawsuit against the fledgling denomination for its name choice, the denomination adopted its current name, the Orthodox Presbyterian Church (or, OPC).

In 1961, the OPC published the Trinity Hymnal. It also publishes a journal called Ordained Servant.

Since its founding, the OPC has produced numerous influential figures, including Scottish theologian John Murray, American theologians Richard B. Gaffin, Jr., Edmund P. Clowney, Loraine Boettner, and Meredith Kline, historian D.G. Hart, and presuppositional theologians Cornelius Van Til and Greg Bahnsen.

== Doctrine ==
The Orthodox Presbyterian Church traces its doctrinal beliefs to the Reformation, and particularly the theology of the French Reformer John Calvin. After his death, Calvin's doctrines were developed and set forth by a 17th-century assembly of British theologians in the Westminster Standards (which include the Westminster Confession of Faith, and the Westminster Larger and Shorter Catechisms). The OPC thus holds to the Westminster Standards (with the American revisions of 1788) for doctrine and practice.

The OPC provides the following summary of its doctrine:

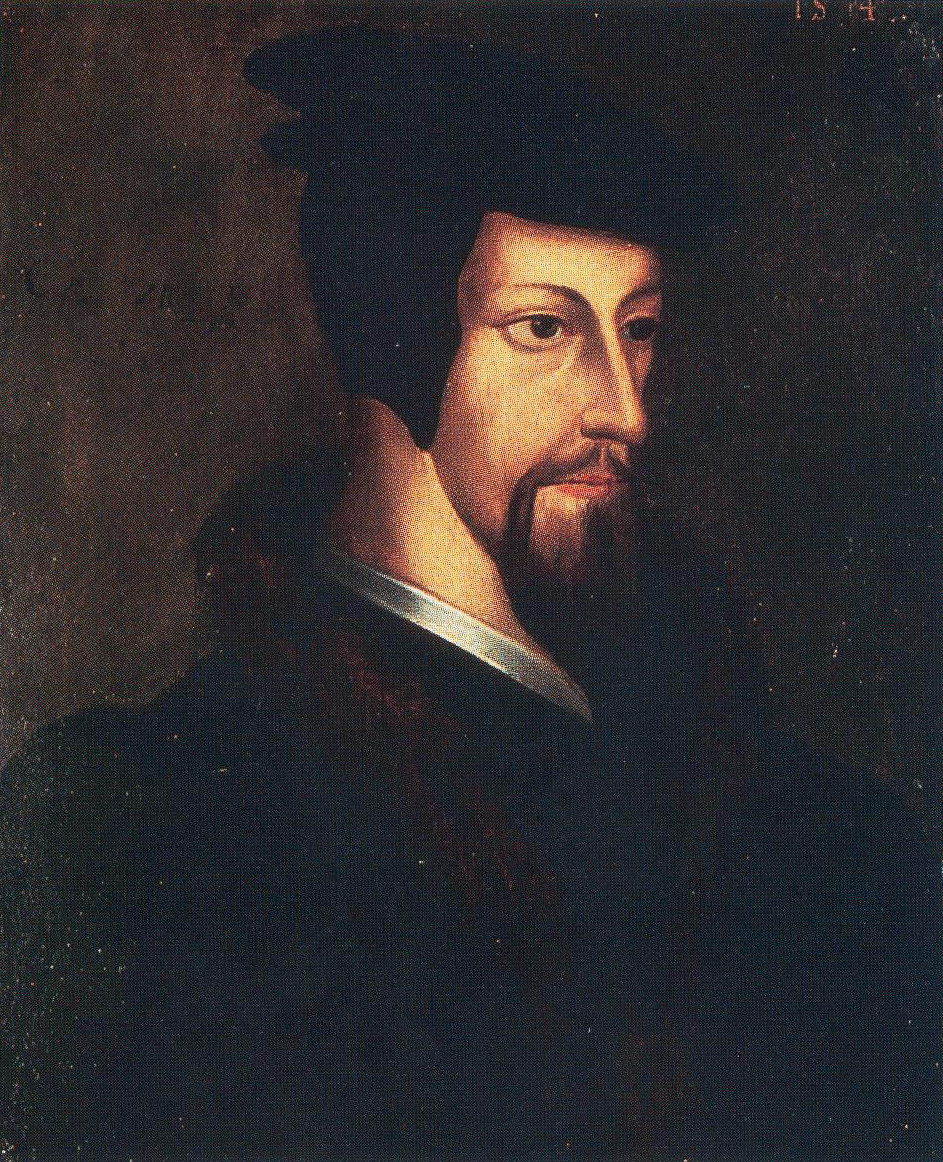
John Calvin is one of the key figures of the Protestant Reformation.

- The Bible, having been inspired by God, is entirely trustworthy and without error. Therefore, we are to believe and obey its teachings. The Bible is the only source of special revelation for the church today.
- The one true God is personal, yet beyond our comprehension. He is an invisible spirit, completely self-sufficient and unbounded by space or time, perfectly holy and just, and loving and merciful. In the unity of the Godhead there are three "persons": the Father, the Son, and the Holy Spirit.
- God created the heavens and the earth, and all they contain. He upholds and governs them in accordance with his eternal will. God is sovereign—in complete control—yet this does not diminish human responsibility.
- Because of the sin of the first man, Adam, all mankind is corrupt by nature, dead in sin, and subject to the wrath of God. But God determined, by a covenant of grace, that sinners may receive forgiveness and eternal life through faith in Jesus Christ. Faith in Christ has always been the only way of salvation, in both Old Testament and New Testament times.
- The Son of God took upon himself a human nature in the womb of the virgin Mary, so that in her son Jesus the divine and human natures were united in one person. Jesus Christ lived a sinless life and died on a cross, bearing the sins of, and receiving God's wrath for, all those who trust in him for salvation (his chosen ones). He rose from the dead and ascended into heaven, where he sits as Lord and rules over his kingdom (the church). He will return to judge the living and the dead, bringing his people (with glorious, resurrected bodies) into eternal life, and consigning the wicked to eternal punishment.
- Those whom God has predestined unto life are effectually drawn to Christ by the inner working of the Spirit as they hear the gospel. When they believe in Christ, God declares them righteous (justifies them), pardoning their sins and accepting them as righteous, not because of any righteousness of their own, but by imputing Christ's merits to them. They are adopted as the children of God and indwelt by the Holy Spirit, who sanctifies them, enabling them increasingly to stop sinning and act righteously. They repent of their sins (both at their conversion and thereafter), produce good works as the fruit of their faith, and persevere to the end in communion with Christ, with assurance of their salvation.
- Those whom God has predestined unto death are ignored by God. God does nothing to prevent them from sinning nor does he help them obtain salvation. The fate of the reprobate are to lead sinful wicked lives and suffer eternal damnation upon death.
- Believers strive to keep God's moral law, which is summarized in the Ten Commandments, not to earn salvation, but because they love their Savior and want to obey him. Good works are a gift prepared by God for his people. God is the Lord of the conscience, so that men are not required to believe or do anything contrary to, or in addition to, the Word of God in matters of faith or worship.
- Christ has established his church, and particular churches, to gather and perfect his people, by means of the ministry of the Word, the sacraments of baptism (which is to be administered to the children of believers, as well as believers) and the Lord's Supper (in which the body and blood of Christ are spiritually present to the faith of believers), and the disciplining of members found delinquent in doctrine or life. Christians assemble on the Lord's Day to worship God by praying, hearing the Word of God read and preached, singing psalms and hymns, and receiving the sacraments.

Despite affirming the Westminster standards, OPC pastors and presbyteries teach a range of doctrines on the biblical creation accounts, from non-evolutionary framework and analogical interpretations to young earth. There is similar variability in terms of eschatology.

== Demographics ==
At the 2026 General Assembly, the OPC reported that, at the end of 2025, the denomination had 601 ministers, 300 congregations and 33,941 members. At the end of 2009, the comparative statistics were 485 ministers, 271 congregations and 29,421 members.

The OPC has 17 Presbyteries across Canada and the United States: Central Pennsylvania, Connecticut and Southern New York, the Dakotas, Michigan and Ontario, Mid-Atlantic, Midwest, New Jersey, New York and New England, Northern California and Nevada, Northwest, Ohio, Philadelphia, South, Southeast, Southern California, Southwest, and Wisconsin and Minnesota.

=== Race ===
In the early 1970s, the General Assembly commissioned a 'Report of the Committee on Problems of Race', which stated that the OPC was a "largely white" denomination, due to losing "the allegiance of blacks during the ecclesiastical discrimination against blacks in the post-civil war period" and ecclesiastical "neglect" of minority groups. The report recommended more outreach to minority and urban areas.

As of 2019, there is one black minister in the OPC. The OPC also has at least 6 Asian ministers, 3 Middle Eastern ministers, and 8 South American ministers.

== American politics ==
OPC ministers have a variety of political views. Carl Trueman, an ordained minister in the OPC, has authored Republocrat: Confessions of a Liberal Conservative (pub. 2010). Greg Bahnsen was also a key figure in the Christian Reconstructionism movement, with an emphasis of applying God's law to contemporary civil and legal matters.

=== Abortion ===
The 39th General Assembly, meeting in 1972, adopted a statement on abortion that included the affirmation that "voluntary abortion, except possibly to save the physical life of the mother, is in violation of the Sixth Commandment (Exodus 20:13)."

=== Military ===
In 1993, the denomination petitioned then President Bill Clinton to continue to disallow homosexuals to serve in the military. The petition states that: "The practice of homosexuality is a reproach to any nation. It undermines the family, and poses a substantial threat to the general health, safety and welfare of our citizens. Your own Christian background ought to demonstrate to you the practical benefits of upholding the biblical stand against homosexuality, especially in light of the current epidemic of AIDS and other diseases spread through homosexual conduct."

The 68th General Assembly in 2001 declared "that the use of women in military combat is both contrary to nature and inconsistent with the Word of God."

=== Immigration ===
In 2006–2007, a study committee formed by the General Assembly created a report that concluded that "the church should never turn its back on fellow brothers and sisters in Christ, whether they are legally or illegally in the country. We should be willing to see to the spiritual and physical needs of anyone who comes to the church." The report nonetheless recommended that illegal immigrants repent of their illegal activity.

== Governance ==
The Orthodox Presbyterian Church has a Presbyterian polity. The offices of the church and corresponding duties can be found in the OPC Book of Church Order.

=== Session ===
A Session consists of the ministers and ruling elders of an individual congregation. The duties of the Session include overseeing public worship, the administration of Baptism and The Lord's Supper, the addition, removal, and discipline of members, and keeping records of membership.

=== Presbytery ===
All of the members of local congregations and its ministers are organized by geography into a regional church, and the presbytery serves as its governing body. The presbytery is composed of all of the ministers and ruling elders of the various congregations in the regional church, and presbytery meetings are to consist of all ministers and one ruling elder from each respective session.

The duties of the presbytery include overseeing evangelism and resolving questions regarding church discipline. The presbytery also takes candidates for ministry under its care, and examines, licenses and ordains them. It also, if necessary, can remove a minister.

=== General Assembly ===
The OPC's General Assembly is the supreme judicatory, and as such, it is to resolve all doctrinal and disciplinary issues that have not been resolved by the sessions and presbyteries. The other duties of the General Assembly include organizing regional churches, calling ministers and licentiates to missionary or other ministries, and reviewing the records from the presbyteries. It also arranges internship training for prospective ministers, and oversees diaconal needs.

The General Assembly meets at least once a year, and is to have, at maximum, 155 voting commissioners, including the moderator and stated clerk of the previous General Assembly, and ministers and ruling elders representing their respective presbyteries.

=== Women in ministry ===
The OPC does not ordain women as pastors, elders, or deacons. At least one congregation allowed women to serve as unordained deaconesses, but that congregation has since closed.

=== Missions ===
There are 38 mission works and eight active foreign mission fields in the OPC today: in China, Eritrea, Ethiopia, Haiti, Quebec, Uganda, Ukraine, and Uruguay. The OPC also has two missionaries currently serving in Japan. Japan was, historically, one of the oldest OPC mission works, but has since closed. One of the OPC's goals is that "indigenous Reformed churches be established which will provide fellowship and instruction, and make the gospel known in its own culture and in others".

The OPC's Committee on Home Missions and Church Extension also serves to help sustain and plant congregations in the United States and Canada. Their duty is to aid presbyteries in planting congregations, finding pastors, purchasing property and church buildings, and assisting home missionaries.

== Ecumenical relations ==
In 1975, the OPC became a founding member of the North American Presbyterian and Reformed Council (NAPARC). Through NAPARC, the OPC enjoys fraternal relations with the PCA, the Reformed Presbyterian Church of North America, the Reformed Church in the United States, the Associate Reformed Presbyterian Church, the United Reformed Churches in North America, the Canadian and American Reformed Churches and several other confessional Continental Reformed and Presbyterian Churches in the United States and Canada.

The OPC is also a member of the International Conference of Reformed Churches (ICRC), which includes Reformed & Presbyterian denominations from across the globe.

Outside NAPARC and ICRC, the OPC has relations with the Africa Evangelical Presbyterian Church, the Reformed Church in Japan, the Presbyterian Church in Japan and the Presbyterian Church of Brazil.
