= Evangelical Assembly of Presbyterian Churches in America =

Religious organization in the United States

- The logo of Evangelical Assembly of Presbyterian Churches in America (EAPCA)
- Abbreviation: EAPCA
- Classification: Protestant
- Orientation: Reformed
- Theology: Calvinist Evangelical
- Polity: Presbyterian
- Moderator: Rev. Dr. Tom J. Cowley
- Region: United States
- Headquarters: New York City, United States
- Origin: 2004
- Congregations: 73 (2022)
- Official website: www.eapca.org

The Evangelical Assembly of Presbyterian Churches in America (AEIPA) is a Presbyterian denomination, formed in 2004 in the United States, by churches of Korean and Chinese origin.

== History ==
In 2004, a group of churches of Korean and Chinese origin organized the Evangelical Assembly of Presbyterian Churches in America (AEIPA). Tom Cowley has since been elected as its moderator.

Although the denomination has grown to around 7 presbyteries and 73 churches, its moderator stated in 2012 that most AEIPA churches are made up of just two or three members.

== Structure ==
=== Departments ===
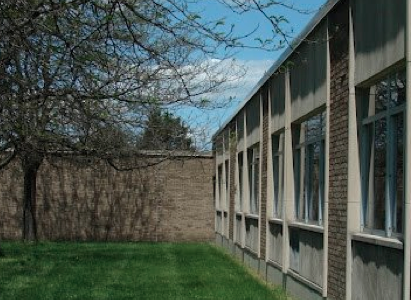
Office of Evangelical Assembly of Presbyterian Churches in America

Six departments of the EAPCA include the General Assembly Office, Department of Mission and Church Planting, Department of Communications, Department of Finance, Department of Member Care, and Council of Education and Spiritual Development. Rev. Dr. Tom J. Cowley, the author of A Biography of Jesus, serves as current Moderator.

=== Presbytery ===
As of December 2009, the Evangelical Assembly of Presbyterian Churches in America consists of seven geographical presbyteries, of which seventy-three churches coordinate both local and global missions.

== Doctrine ==
The Constitution of the EAPCA includes the Book of Order and the Book of Confessions. The Book of Order is composed of three parts, which are the Book of Government, the Book of Worship, and the Book of Disciplines. The Book of Confessions is composed of four parts, which are the Westminster Confession of Faith, the Westminster Shorter Catechism, the Westminster Larger Catechism, and the EAPCA's own Statement of Fait.

The Evangelical Assembly of Presbyterian Churches in America is both Evangelical and Presbyterian in its doctrine and tradition, emphasizing the authority of the Bible and importance of mission and education.

== Interchurch Relations ==
The denomination has participated in the National Association of Evangelicals and the World Evangelical Alliance.

== Seminar ==
The denomination administers Olivet University, which exists for the training of its pastors.

== Controversies ==
The denomination's seminary, Olivet University, was founded in 2000 by Rev. David Jang. This pastor was accused in 2012 of promoting the teaching that he was the incarnation of Jesus at his Christ's Second Coming. However, this accusation was denied by Rev. David Jang himself and Rev. Anthony Chiu, secretary of the AEIPA.

In 2018, Rev. Por Douglas Douma of Bible Presbyterian Church accused the AEIPA of being a "ghost denomination" due to the fact that the address of none of its churches is known or the name of any of its pastors. in addition to the moderator.
