= Korean Presbyterian Church in America (Kosin) =

Christian denomination

- Classification: Protestant
- Orientation: Reformed
- Theology: Calvinist
- Polity: Presbyterian
- Associations: North American Presbyterian and Reformed Council
- Origin: 1992
- Branched from: Kosin Presbyterian Church in Korea
- Congregations: 135 (2015)
- Members: 10,300 (2015)
- Official website: kosinusa.org

The Korean Presbyterian Church in America (Kosin) (KPCA) is a Presbyterian denomination founded in United States in 1992 by missionaries from Kosin Presbyterian Church in Korea.

== History ==
Due to the migration of Koreans to the United States, the Kosin Presbyterian Church in Korea started church planting in United States in 1984. In 1992 the Korean Presbyterian Church in America (Kosin).

Since then, the denomination has grown to 135 churches, 185 ordained pastors, 126 ruling elders, and approximately 10,300 members in 8 presbyteries in 2015.

== Doctrine ==
The church subscribes to the Westminster Confession of Faith, Westminster Larger Catechism and Westminster Shorter Catechism. Also, it does not allow women's ordination.

== Interecclesiastical Relations ==
KPCA is a member of the North American Presbyterian and Reformed Council.
