= Associate Reformed Presbyterian Church =

Protestant denomination

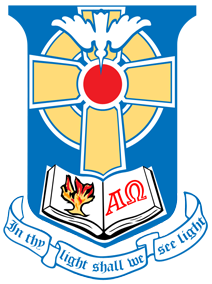
- The seal of the ARPC
- Abbreviation: ARPC
- Classification: Protestant
- Theology: Evangelical Calvinist
- Governance: Presbyterian
- Associations: World Reformed Fellowship, NAPARC
- Region: United States, Canada, Mexico
- Origin: 1803; Winnsboro, South Carolina
- Merger of: Associate Presbytery (Seceder) and almost all of the Reformed Presbytery
- Congregations: 264 (2018)
- Members: 22,459 (2018)
- Official website: arpchurch.org

The Associate Reformed Presbyterian Church (ARPC) is a theologically conservative denomination in North America. The ARPC was formed by the merger of the Associate Presbytery (seceder) with the Reformed Presbytery (covenanter) in 1782. It is one of the oldest conservative denominations in the United States.

== History ==
After the Westminster Confession was signed by its drafters in 1643, some of the "Covenanters", a Presbyterian group, left the Church of Scotland for the New World to avoid signing an oath to the monarch. These early believers seceded from the Church of Scotland over doctrinal differences. Some ministers stayed in the Church of Scotland to work out their differences.

By 1739, a Scottish Presbyterian pastor Ebenezer Erskine led a group of ministers to leave the Church of Scotland who formed a separate group, the Seceders, which again opposed the main group and had doctrinal differences. Ebenezer Erskine and his brother Ralph Erskine preached sermons that later became the inspiration for the Associate Reformed Church in the American colonies. The monarch moved some of Ebenezer Erskine's followers to the northern Irish province of Ulster to quell religious disputes among Catholics and Protestants. These Ulster Scots Seceders and the Catholics continued to battle and some of the Scots Irish later emigrated to the American colonies with Seceder ministers from Scotland in the mid-1700s. They settled with the Covenanters in Pennsylvania, New York, Ohio, Virginia, North Carolina, South Carolina, and Georgia.

Some churches of the Covenanter tradition and the Seceder tradition came together officially in Philadelphia, Pennsylvania, in 1782. The Synod of the South was formed consisting of churches in North and South Carolina and Georgia in 1803 and still another in Texas. Each tradition put aside doctrinal differences to come together as long as oath-signing to a central government could be avoided. For decades, the Associate Reformed Church denounced slavery; however, in 1831, the church passed a resolution that members must free their slaves immediately or be denied communion. This led to a severance of churches in the Southern Synod--particularly in the Carolina presbytery--from the Northern Synod. In 1858, the Northern Synod of the Associate Reformed Church merged with the Associate Presbyterians to form the United Presbyterian Church of North America.

=== Southern synod ===
The Associate Reformed Presbyterian Church of today traces its roots to the Synod of the South, formed in 1803. Almost immediately after forming the Synod of the South, the ministers looked into forming a seminary closer to home for the education of the ministry and the growth of the church. Many of the ministers were traveling for more than thirty days on horseback to attend Synod meetings in the North. While they were gone, the churches and the congregations suffered in their absence. The solution they agreed to work towards was an academy called the Clarke and Erskine Seminary, which later became known as Erskine College and Seminary.

=== Western synod ===
While the larger Presbyterian Church was a mix of Scottish and English Presbyterians, several smaller Presbyterian groups were almost entirely Scottish Seceders, and they displayed the process of assimilation into the broader American religious culture. Fisk (1968) traces the history of the Associate Reformed Church in the Old Northwest from its formation by a union of Associate and Reformed Presbyterians in 1782 to the merger of this body with the Seceder bodies to form the United Presbyterian Church in 1858. It became the Associate Reformed Synod of the West and remained centered in the Midwest. It withdrew from the parent body in 1820 because of Confessional disagreements regarding the administration of sacraments.

The Associate Reformed Synod of the West maintained the characteristics of an immigrant church with Scottish roots, emphasized the Westminster Standards, used only the Psalms in public worship, was Sabbatarian and was strongly abolitionist and anti-Catholic. In the 1850s however, it exhibited evidence of assimilation. It showed greater ecumenical interest, greater interest in the evangelization of the West and of the cities, and a declining interest in maintaining the unique characteristics of its Scotch-Irish past.

== The ARPC today ==
In 2018, the ARPC had 22,459 members in 264 churches. The denominational office is located in Greenville, South Carolina. Also, the denomination operates a conference center, Bonclarken, in Flat Rock, North Carolina. The conference center is surrounded by private property, many of whose owners trace their ARP roots to the beginnings of the denomination. Membership in the ARP Church is concentrated in the Southeastern United States, especially North Carolina and South Carolina. There are also numerous congregations in Florida, Georgia, Tennessee, Mississippi, Arkansas, Missouri, Oklahoma, and Virginia. The ARPC has churches in Canada and in most states of the United States. There are separate synods in Mexico and Pakistan. The ARP Church was among the first to send missionaries to China as early as 1880. The ARP Church sponsors missionaries internationally through World Witness.

The ARP Church is affiliated with the North American Presbyterian and Reformed Council and shares a common theology with other conservative Presbyterian denominations. It holds to the infallibility and inerrancy of the Bible. The church does not ordain women as ministers or elders, though it does permit local sessions to determine whether to ordain female deacons. Having been originally formed by a merger of two denominations holding to exclusive psalmody, this was the practice of the ARP Church until 1946, when its synod allowed the use of hymns other than the Psalms; each congregational session has right of discretion concerning the matter of music in worship. At the 207th General Synod, a new ARP psalter was approved for use in the denomination to encourage the increased use of Psalm singing in public worship.

In 1837 the church established an academy for men in Due West, S.C., which in 1839 became Erskine College, the first four-year church-related college in that state.

Erskine Theological Seminary, established as Clarke and Erskine Seminary in 1837, is the professional school of Erskine College; it was incorporated into Erskine College when the latter was founded two years later. The Seminary became a separate but associated school in 1858 and was reincorporated into the College in 1925. Erskine merged with the Due West Female College in the first decade of the 20th century. Erskine became the first private denominational school in South Carolina to allow women instructors at that time. Since its inception, Erskine has provided training for students of the ARPC and of other denominations. Recent years, however, have witnessed ARP ministers graduating from other seminaries.

=== Canadian Synod ===
The 2024 General Synod voted to release the Canadian Presbytery to create a Canadian Synod, a separate national denomination for Canada. On September 1, 2025, the Associate Reformed Presbyterian Church in Canada was established with its 12 churches. At the 2025 General Synod, the ARPC agreed to sponsor the ARPCC for NAPARC membership.

== Basic beliefs ==
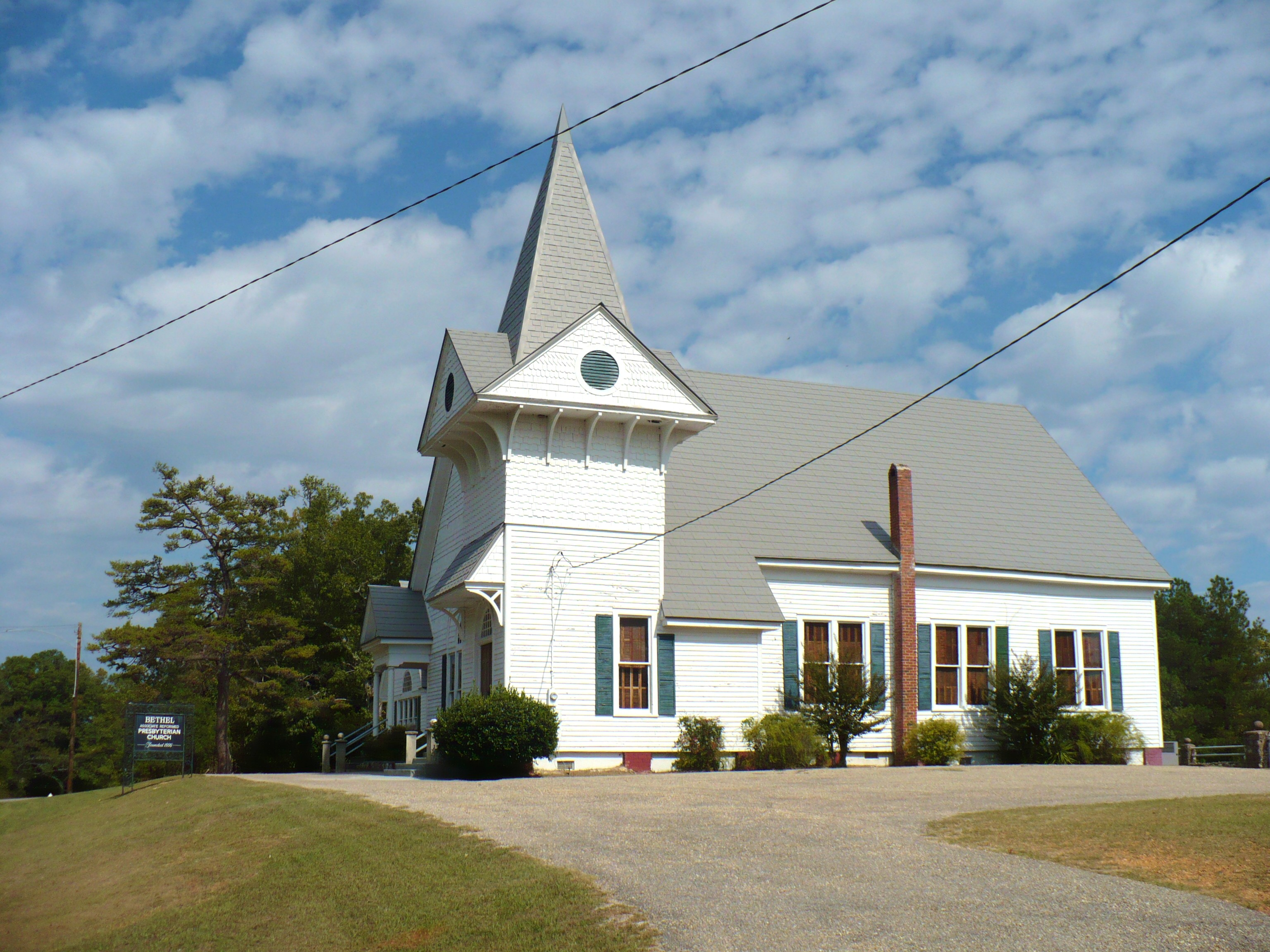
Bethel ARP Church in Oak Hill, Alabama

Along with other Presbyterian churches, the Associate Reformed Presbyterian Church uses the Westminster Confession of Faith, the Larger Catechism and the Shorter Catechism as subordinate standards. In its 1990 Purpose Statement, the church declared that "we express our desire to continue to be a Presbyterian and Reformed church, committed to the Lordship of Jesus Christ and to the Bible as the Word of God." It listed some of its core commitments as:

- The worship of the Triune God.
- The Holy Scriptures as the basis for our faith and activity.
- Unity with other believers in Christ.
- Total stewardship of life, including tithing of time, talents, and money.
- Loving and caring for one another and for other people.
- Excellence in education and equipping leaders for tomorrow.
- Spreading the Gospel to all parts of the world.
- Evaluating and changing church structures and priorities to meet the challenges of the future while preserving the best of the past.

The ARPC takes a conservative view of the Bible, stating that "the Bible alone, being God-breathed, is the Word of God written, infallible in all that it teaches, and inerrant in the original manuscripts." The Holy Spirit reveals through the text that "God the Father gave His Son to save us from our sins."

== Interchurch organizations ==
The Associate Reformed Presbyterian Church is a member of the World Reformed Fellowship, and the North American Presbyterian and Reformed Council. Membership in the International Conference of Reformed Churches was dropped in June 2011.

== Stances regarding social issues ==
The ARPC designates the Sunday nearest to January 22 as "Sanctity of Human Life Sunday," encouraging non-violent opposition to legalized abortion. In addition, the denomination officially calls homosexuals "to repentance, cleansing, and deliverance in the saving power of Jesus Christ."

== Members and ministers ==
Evangelist Billy Graham attended the Chalmers Memorial ARP Church in Charlotte, North Carolina, as a child; his parents were members of the congregation. Graham was later ordained as a Southern Baptist minister.

The noted Southern writer Erskine Caldwell was the son of an ARP minister in Georgia.

Noted ARP ministers of today and the recent past include Jay E. Adams, Sinclair Ferguson, Derek Thomas, Michael A. Milton, and Frank Reich.
