= Three Forms of Unity =

Reformed church originating in continental Europe

The Three Forms of Unity is a collective name for the Belgic Confession, the Canons of Dort, and the Heidelberg Catechism, which reflect the doctrinal concerns of continental Calvinism and are accepted as official statements of doctrine by many Calvinist churches.

== History ==
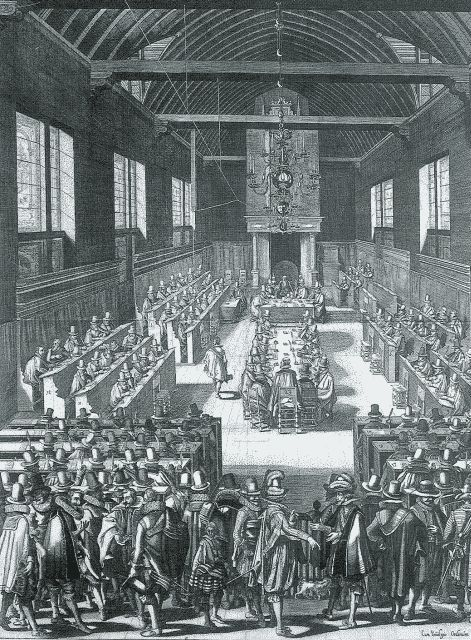
The Synod held at Dort

From 1618 to 1619, the Dutch government on behalf of the Dutch Reformed Church, called and convened the Synod of Dort. Dutch delegates, along with twenty-seven Calvinist representatives from eight other countries, met at this Synod of Dort, where they collectively summarized their views in what was called the "Canons of Dort".

This same Synod then added these Canons to two other documents, both of which were in common use by the Dutch Church at the time: the Heidelberg Catechism (1563) and the Belgic Confession (1561).

In so doing, the Synod sought:

1. to formalize their understanding of the Biblical teachings on the Trinity, the incarnation, predestination, justification, and the church;
2. to allow members to gather together in unity around fundamental, shared beliefs;
3. to relegate certain non-essential ideas (political positions, educational platforms, etc.) to a lower status to prevent the churches from needlessly splitting—the forms also provide a basis upon which ecumenical efforts can proceed based on whether a body accepts the essentials laid out in these forms

The different documents each serve different purposes.

- The Catechism is written in a question-and-answer format to help explain biblical teaching to children and those new to the faith.
- The Confession explains various biblical teachings.
- The Canons are a series of technical responses to specific theological controversies raised by the Dutch Remonstrants (see History of the Calvinist-Arminian debate).

== Four Forms of Unity ==
Some Reformed denominations have included the Westminster Confession to their confessional standards. These include the Christian Reformed Church of Australia and the Reformed Churches of New Zealand.
