= Canons of Dort =

Judgment of the National Synod held in Dordrecht (Dort) in 1618–19 against Arminianism

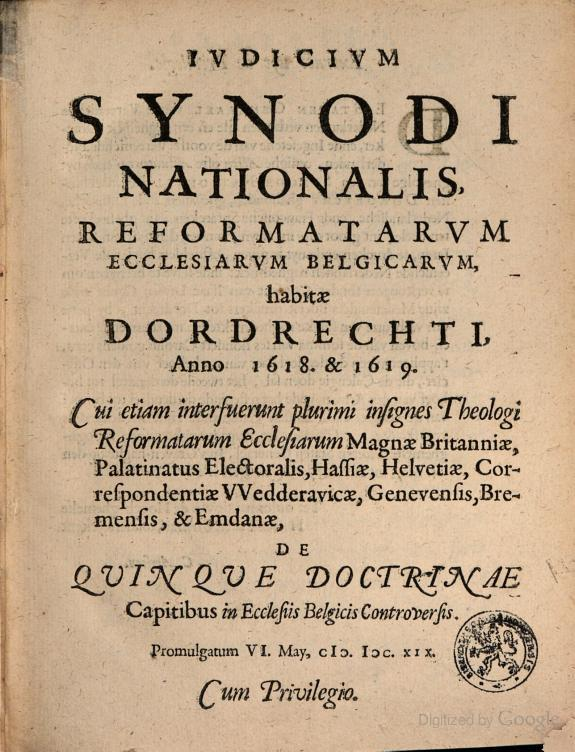

The Canons of Dort, or Canons of Dordrecht, formally titled The Decision of the Synod of Dort on the Five Main Points of Doctrine in Dispute in the Netherlands, is an exposition of orthodox Reformed soteriology against Arminianism, by the National Synod held in the Dutch city of Dordrecht in 1618–1619. At the time, Dordrecht was often referred to in English as in local dialects as Dort or Dordt. The Canons are of a similar nature to the Nicene Creed, in that they were written to settle a theological controversy (Arianism in the case of the Nicene Creed and the Arminian controversy in the case of Dort), affirming and vindicating the orthodox position.

== Background ==
These canons are a judicial decision on the doctrinal points in dispute in the Arminian controversy of that day. Following the death of Jacobus Arminius (1560–1609), his followers set forth in 1610 the Five Articles of Remonstrance. The five articles formulated their points of departure from the Confessional Reformed beliefs of the Belgic Confession that they had sworn ministerial oaths to teach and uphold. The Canons of Dort represent the judgment of the Synod against this Remonstrance. The Synod consisted of eighty-four Reformed divines (fifty-eight of whom were Dutch) and eighteen lay assessors. The States General of the Dutch Republic requested the attendance of foreign representatives from countries with significant Reformed populations. In later years, Arminian theology received official acceptance by the State and has since continued in various forms within Protestantism, especially within the Methodist churches.

== Content ==
The Canons consist of four chapters which serve as a response to the five points of the Remonstrance (the response to the third and fourth articles are combined), offering a detailed explanation of the Reformed perspective on five 'heads' of doctrine, each head consisting of a positive and a negative part, and a conclusion exhorting Christians to humility and reverence for the doctrine of predestination.

- First Head of Doctrine: of Divine Predestination.
- Second Head of Doctrine: of the Death of Christ and the Redemption of Man thereby.
- Third and Fourth Heads of Doctrine: of the Corruption of Man, his Conversion to God, and the Manner thereof.
- Fifth Head of Doctrine: of the Perseverance of the Saints.

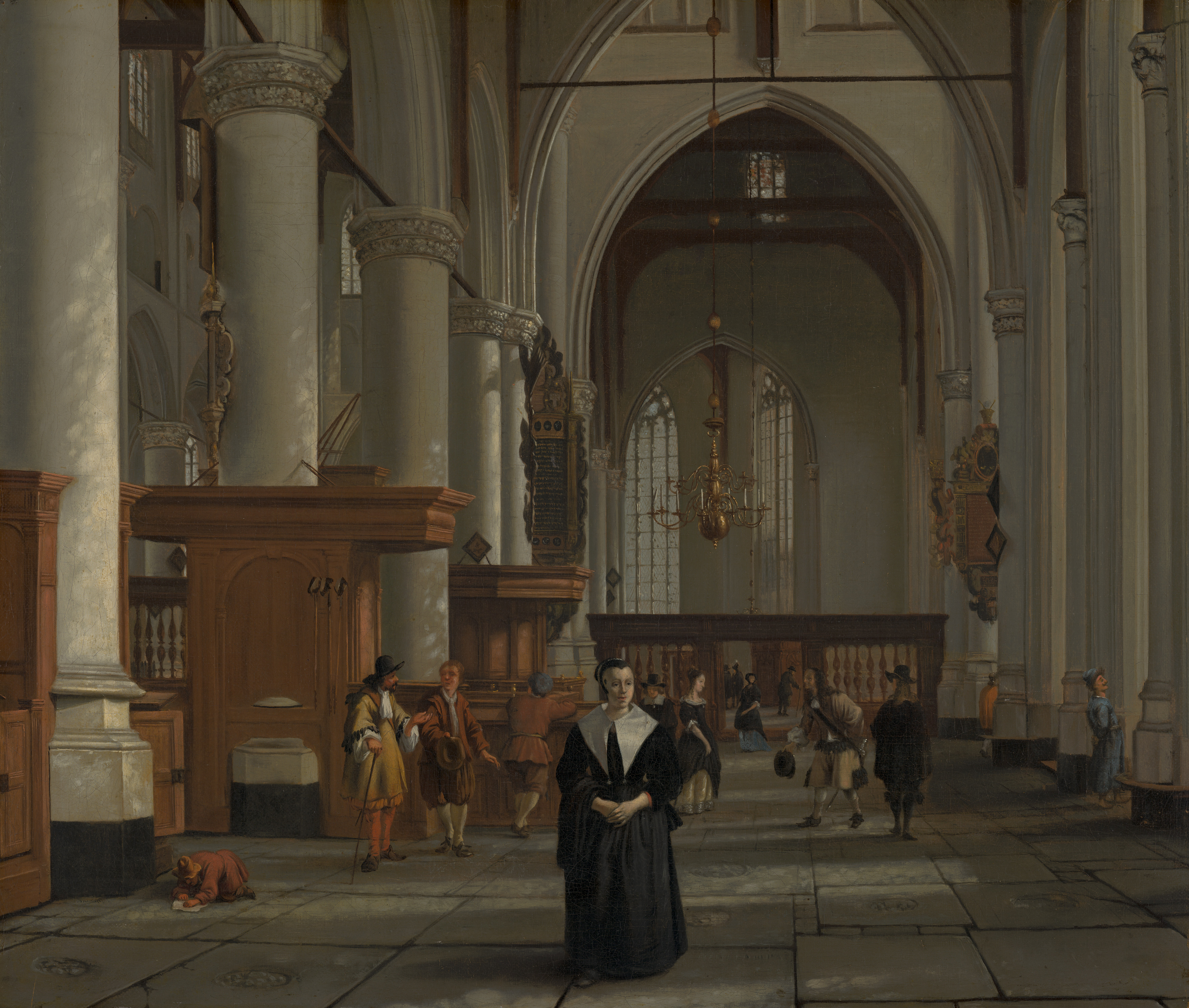
The Canons of Dort are an essential and enduring expression of orthodox Reformed soteriology against Arminianism, and are considered authoritative in many Reformed churches today.

The canons were not intended to be a comprehensive explanation of Reformed doctrine, but only an exposition on the five points of doctrine in dispute. The five points of Calvinism, remembered by the mnemonic TULIP (total depravity, unconditional election, limited atonement, irresistible grace and perseverance of the saints) and popularised by a 1963 booklet, are popularly said to summarise the 1618 Canons of Dort. While related to the 1618 Canons of Dort, the five points of Calvinism do not actually come from the 1618 document itself but from an earlier document and correction against the Arminians during the same controversy. The five points of Calvinism comes from the Counter Remonstrance of 1611.

== Significance ==
Today the Canons of Dort form part of the Three Forms of Unity, the confessional standards of many of the Reformed churches around the world, including the Netherlands, South Africa, Australia and North America. Their continued use as a standard sets apart the Reformed Churches from those adhering to the doctrines of Jacob Arminius, the Remonstrants. W. A. Curtis in his History of Creeds and Confessions of Faith describes the merits of the Canons thus.

[The Canons'] tone is as admirable as their eloquence is noble and sustained. Their ethical sensitiveness and zeal for the Divine glory, even at the cost of man's dignity, are manifest. Their courage in facing the problems of election and sin in the light of Scriptural revelation—problems which practically all non-Calvinistic systems discreetly elude or ignore—is worthy of the high spirit and noble ardour of the Dutch nation then emerging from their long struggle for independence.
