= Belgic Confession =

Christian confession of faith

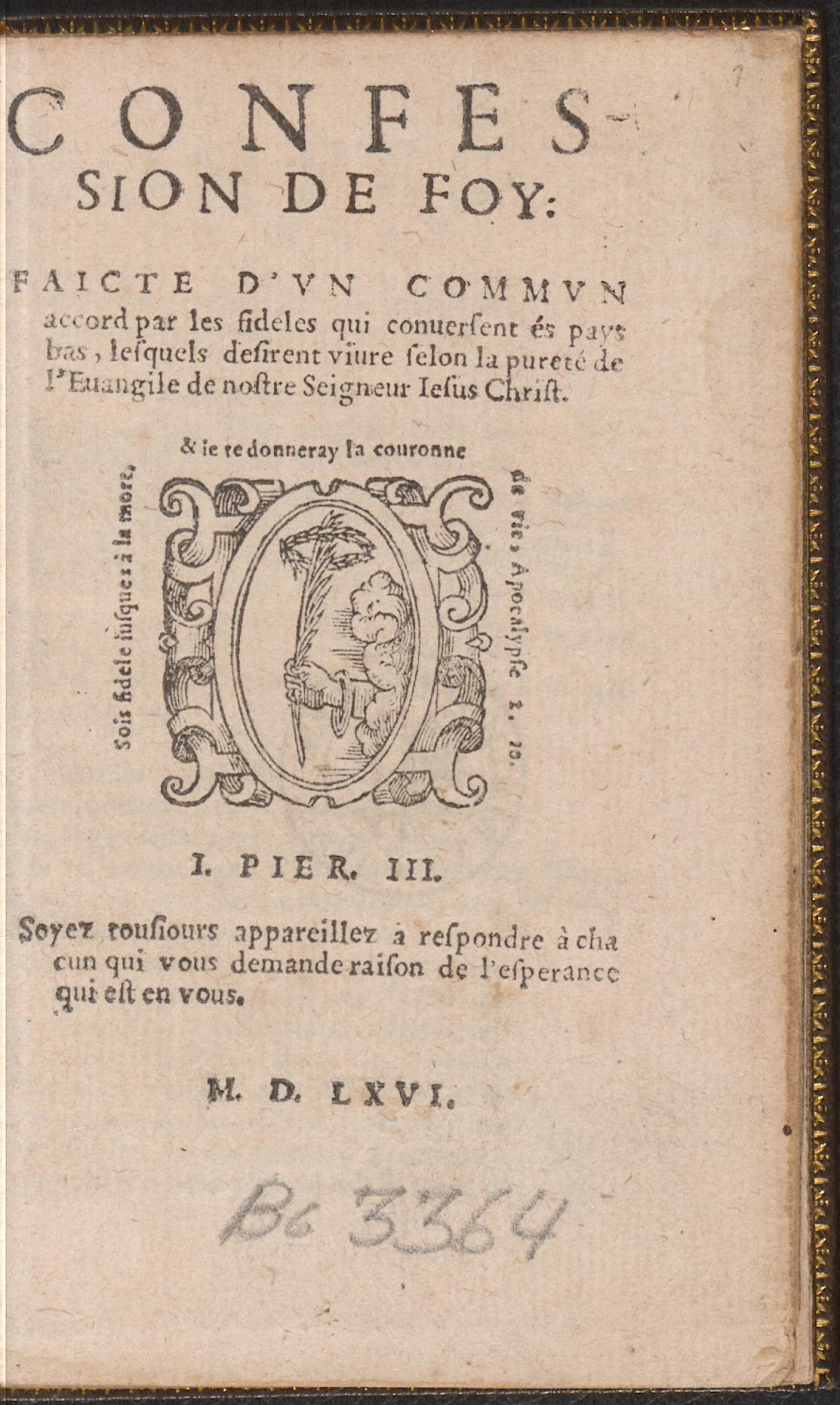
Title page of a 1566 copy

The Confession of Faith, popularly known as the Belgic Confession, is a confession to which many Reformed churches subscribe as a doctrinal standard. The Confession forms part of the Three Forms of Unity, which are the official subordinate standards of the Dutch Reformed Church. The confession's chief author was Guido de Brès, a Walloon Reformed pastor, active in the Low Countries, who died a martyr to the faith in 1567, during the Dutch Reformation. The name Belgic Confession follows the 17th-century Latin Confessio Belgica. Belgica referred to the whole of the Low Countries, both north and south, which today is divided into the Netherlands and Belgium.

== Authorship and revisions ==
The initial text was prepared by de Brès in 1559, and was influenced by the Gallic Confession. De Brès showed it in draft to others, including Hadrian à Saravia, Herman Moded and Godfried van Wingen (Wingius). It was revised by Franciscus Junius, who abridged the sixteenth article and sent a copy to Geneva and other churches for approval; and it was presented to Philip II of Spain in 1562, in the hope of securing toleration for his Protestant subjects in the Low Countries. In 1566, the text of this confession was revised at a synod held in Antwerp. It was adopted by national synods held during the last three decades of the 16th century.

The Belgic Confession became the basis of a counter to the Arminian controversy that arose in the following century, but Jacobus Arminius himself opposed the notion that it could be used against his theology. The text was revised again at the Synod of Dort in 1618–1619, was included in the Canons of Dort (1618–1619), and adopted as one of the doctrinal standards to which all office-bearers and members of the Reformed churches were required to subscribe.

== Editions and translations ==
The first French edition is extant in four printings, two from 1561 and two from 1562. The Synod of Antwerp of 1580 ordered a copy of the revised text of Junius to be made for its archives, to be signed by every new minister; this manuscript has always been regarded in the Belgic churches as the authentic document. The first Latin translation was made from Junius' text by Theodore Beza, or under his direction, for the Harmonia Confessionum (Geneva, 1581), and passed into the first edition of the Corpus et Syntagma Confessionum (Geneva, 1612). A second Latin translation was prepared by Festus Hommius for the Synod of Dort, 1618, revised and approved 1619; and from it was made the English translation in use in the Reformed (Dutch) Church in America. It appeared in Greek 1623, 1653, and 1660, at Utrecht. It has also been the subject of published commentaries in recent years.

== Characteristics ==
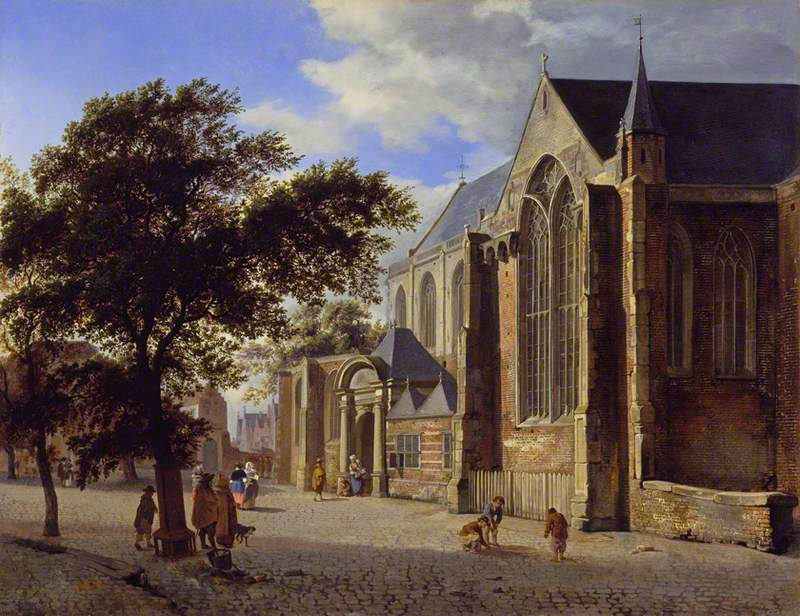
The Belgic Confession became one of the most significant doctrinal standards for the Reformed faith, especially among the Dutch Reformed.

The Confession begins with the phrase "We all believe with the heart, and confess with the mouth," which gives it the distinctive character of a confession of faith. W. A. Curtis writes that:

[Faith] is the organ which grasps religious truth. [... Faith] in its full meaning is vital to the highest experience of religion, and as such is bound to find expression when religion becomes self-conscious and articulate. [...] In the language of religious self-utterance, therefore, credo, "I believe," and confiteor, "I confess or acknowledge," must always have a foremost place.

Thus the Belgic Confession, due to its emphasis upon belief and confession, is essentially religious in that it deals with matters of faith, which in Hebrews 11:1, is defined as "the assurance of things hoped for, the conviction of things not seen." The theological doctrines confessed are not simply the object of intellectual assent, but of belief and confession, which Curtis elaborates on,

Belief and confession are presupposed in all the other moods of worship—in praise, in thanksgiving, in self-abasement, in supplication, in hope, and in love; they are the persistent undertones in the natural liturgy of the universal religious consciousness. They imply that the period of ignorance or doubt is past; that conviction is attained; that the spiritual life is come to itself; that the seeker has at last found, and that the soul is at rest.

In this way, the Belgic Confession is of a similar nature to the ancient Christian creeds, including the Apostles' Creed, Nicene Creed and Athanasian Creed. As Daniel R. Hyde has written, "It contains the 'old paths' (Jer. 6:16) of the prophets and apostles, ancient church fathers and ecumenical councils."

The Confession may also be categorised with other Reformation-era creeds, such as the Augsburg Confession of 1530, as "apologetic" in character; as a "vindication of the true character of the religious belief cherished by a body of Christians". In other words, one of the "authentic expositions of distinctive doctrine, intended to remove misconceptions and to repudiate misrepresentations".

The Confession avoids explicit provocations of Roman Catholicism which were characteristic of the Gallic Confession, the order of which de Brès closely followed. The Belgic Confession instead expands on the doctrines of the Trinity, Incarnation, Church and sacraments, while frequently distinguishing itself from Anabaptist theology. Philip Schaff said that the Confession is "upon the whole, the best symbolical statement of the Calvinistic system of doctrine, with the exception of the Westminster Confession." In the Encyclopedia of the Reformed Faith, M. Eugene Osterhaven outlines the contents of the Confession.

The topical order is traditional: God and how God is known (arts. 1-11); creation and providence (arts. 12-13); fall and election (arts. 14-16); salvation in Christ (arts. 17-21); justification and sanctification (arts. 22-26); the church (arts. 27-29); church order (arts. 30-32); sacraments (arts. 33-35); church and state (arts. 36); and last things (arts. 37). Distinctive Reformed emphases are: Scripture as normative; the sovereignty of God and God's grace, sin, salvation in Christ alone, including sanctification and good works; the law of God as a help in Christian living; Calvin's view of the sacraments; and the state as the instrument of God and vehicle of God's grace.

== See also ==
- Heidelberg Catechism (1563)
- Canons of Dort (1618-1619)
- Marks of the Church (Protestantism)
