= National Presbyterian Church in Mexico =

Protestant denomination in Mexico

National Presbyterian Church in Mexico La Iglesia Nacional Presbiteriana de México A.R.
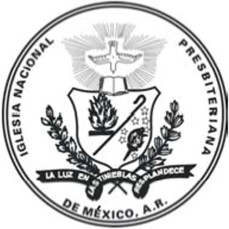
- Seal of the INPM
- Classification: Protestant
- Orientation: Presbyterian
- Theology: Reformed
- Polity: Presbyterian
- Associations: World Communion of Reformed Churches; World Reformed Fellowship; Alliance of Presbyterian and Reformed Churches in the Mexican Republic
- Region: Mexico
- Origin: 1901; Mexico City
- Branched from: Presbyterian Church in the United States; United Presbyterian Church in the United States of America
- Separations: National Conservative Presbyterian Church in Mexico; Independent Presbyterian Church in Mexico
- Congregations: 6,000
- Members: 2,800,000
- Official website: https://www.iglesianacionalpresbiteriana.com/

The National Presbyterian Church in Mexico (Spanish: La Iglesia Nacional Presbiteriana de México A.R.) is the second-largest Protestant church, and the largest Reformed denomination in Mexico. It is present throughout the country, and is particularly strong in the states of Tabasco, Chiapas, Campeche, Yucatan, Nuevo León, Aguascalientes and Mexico City.

In 2010 there was a report of more than 6,000 churches and almost 2.8 million members.

== History and formation of the church ==
=== Early years ===
The beginning of Presbyterianism in Mexico dates back to 1827 with the arrival of Diego Thompson, an agent of the British and Foreign Bible Society. Pioneers of Presbyterianism in Mexico include: Dr. Julio Mallet Prevost, WG Allen, Melinda Rankin, Rev. AJ Park and Arcadio Morales.

=== The beginnings ===
The National Presbyterian Church in Mexico was established by missionaries from the United States. Around 1872, the Southern and Northern Presbyterian Churches, the Associate Reformed Presbyterian Church and the Congregationalist Church in the United States began working in Mexico. The Northern Presbyterian Church covered Mexico City, San Luis Potosí, Villa de Cos and in the Federal District. Later, their efforts were extended into Guerrero, Oaxaca, Veracruz and Tabasco. The Southern Presbyterian Church was active in Texas and Matamoros, Tamaulipas. The first Presbyterian missionaries were Rev. Thompson and Rev. Paul H. Petkin Rev Maxwell Philips P. Mallen Ailen of the Presbyterian Church USA arrived in Veracruz. This work progressed rapidly. Rev Hutchinson stayed in Mexico City while the others moved north to Zacatecas and San Luis Potosi. The Mission in Mexico started with people who broke from the Episcopal church. Mr Arcadio Morales formed the first Presbyterian congregation in Mexico. Morales planted the Divine Savior Church, he became the first pastor of the church, in 1882 the church's membership grew to 552, it became the first congregation that can sustain its pastor. Earlier in 1878 the first 11 Mexican ministers were ordained.

=== The First Presbytery ===
On May 12, 1885 the first Presbytery, the Presbytery of Mexico City was organised. Later in 1896 a new Presbytery was organised the Presbytery of the Gulf of Mexico. In the 1890s these Presbyterian missionaries united their efforts.

=== Formal establishment ===
In 1901, the National Presbyterian Church in Mexico held its first synod with 73 churches and 5,500 members. Four presbyteries were represented from Mexico City, Zacatecas, Tamaulipas, and the Gulf of Mexico.

In 1918, American Presbyterians, the Disciples of Christ and the Methodist church met in Cincinnati, and divided mission work in the country of Mexico between them. American Presbyterians took on the southern part of Mexico and the northern region became the mission field of the Methodists. The Presbyterians get the territory from Tampico to the South and South East, reduced work only the states of Oaxaca, Chiapas, Tabasco, Campeche, Yucatan, southern Veracruz and Quintana Roo territory. Presbyterian churches in the north were told to become Methodists, while Methodists in the south were told to worship as Presbyterians. Many churches in Nuevo Leon and Monterrey resisted and stayed in the Presbyterian fold. In Latin America–according to the Plan–the Presbyterians get Guatemala, Chile and Colombia, the Methodists get Costa Rica and Bolivia.

The National Presbyterian Church did not approve the Cincinnati Plan, considering that the national denomination has already consolidated. Rev. Leandro, who was against the Cincinnati Plan, and he and The Presbyteries of Tamaulipas, Zacatecas, quit relations with the Southern Presbyterian Church. They feared that the Plan wants to demolish Presbyterians in the North. The Methodists protested because the Presbyterians didn't give temples to the Methodist in North Mexico, but Presbyterians get the Methodist Church buildings in Cuernavaca and Toluca and Morean in the south.

On November 28, 1919, the National Presbyterian Church in Mexico was officially formed.

=== New Constitution ===
On July 22, 1937 a Constitution was translated by Dr. Enrique C. Thompson and approved in the General Assembly in the city of Toluca by the National Presbyterian Church in Mexico and later approved the revised edition common called the "Torres Edition".

=== Church developments ===
In the 1920s, a Ministry among the Chiapas people began first in Spanish speaking population and in 1950 an outreach among Mayan-speaking people was made, such as Chol, Tzotil, Tzeltzal indigenous groups. In 2002, the Chiapas region was reportedly among the strongholds of the denomination. Six presbyteries work in the southern regions of the Chiapas, Oaxaca and Potosina and Huasteca, working with local people in their languages.

In 1947 the first General Assembly was organized, with nine presbyteries, and in 1972 the denomination celebrated its 100th anniversary of life. The Mexican and US Presbyterian churches agreed to a joint effort of evangelizing.

=== Recent status ===
By 1972 the church didn't need any outside support. The INPM was composed of 3 synods and 18 presbyteries. The church proposed a moratorium to avoid relying on foreign missions to advance the National Church. Due to the Cincinnati Plan, the church lost a lot of schools in Northern Mexico, and it broke mission efforts in Northern Mexico for decades.

In the 1990s the church had 4,800 congregations, 1.2 million members in 40 presbyteries and 7 synods.

By 1997 there were 8 synods and 50 presbyteries at the General Assembly.

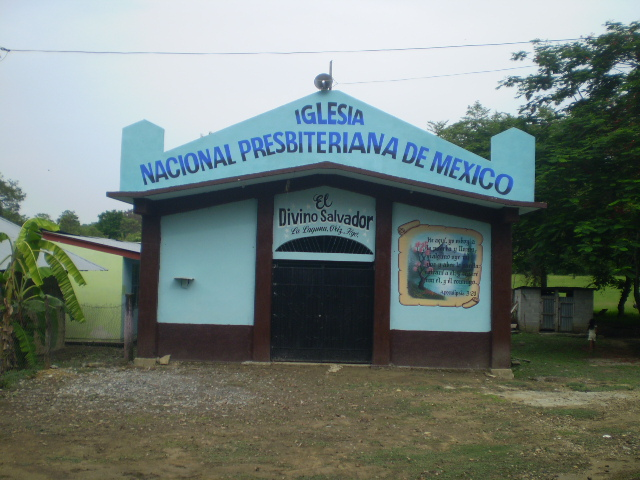
National Presbyterian Church in Mexico

In Chiapas, the National Presbyterian Church has grown 10-12 percent annually, with 18,000 people joining each year.

== Governance ==
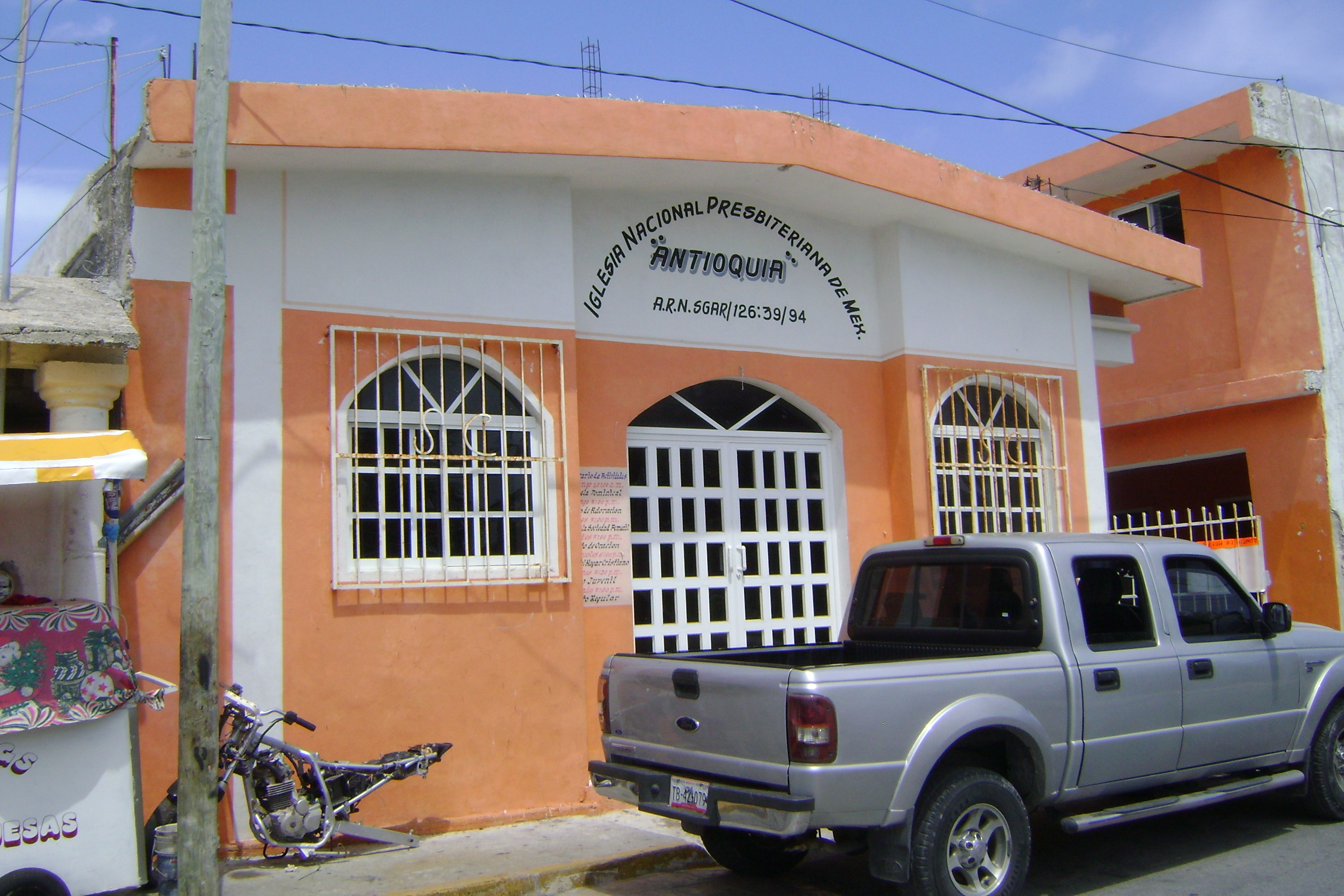
Presbyterian Church in Isla Mujeres

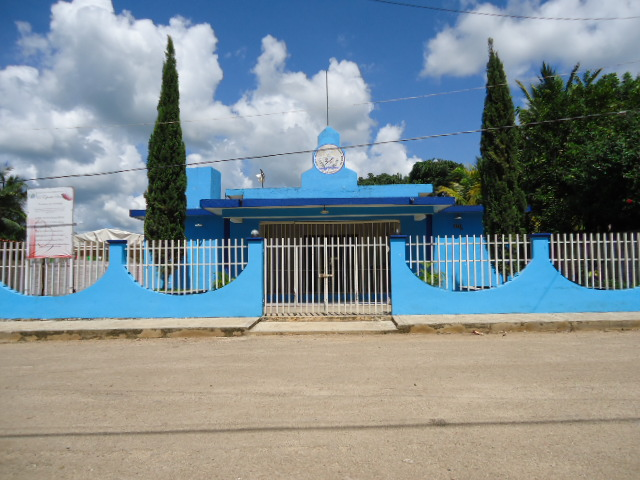
Espiritu santo Presbyterian church

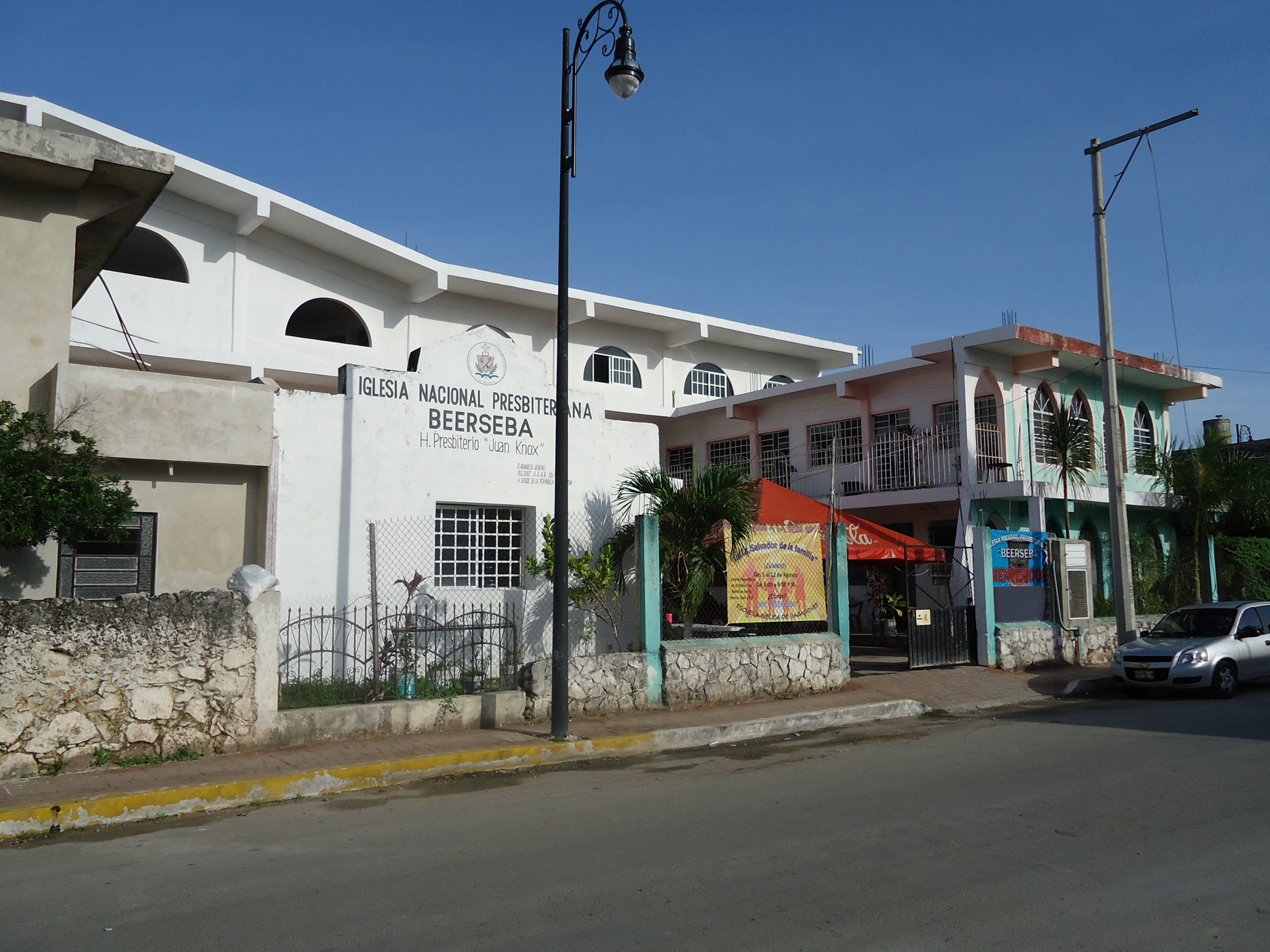
Beerseba Presbyterian Church

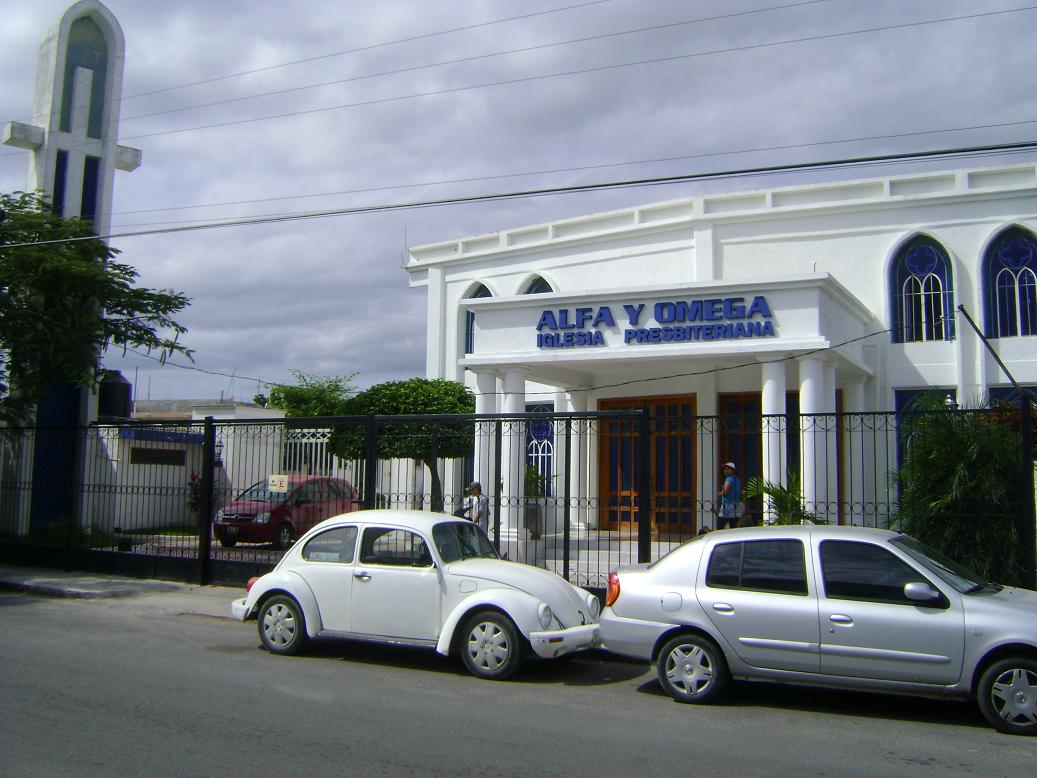
Playa del Carmen Presbyterian Church

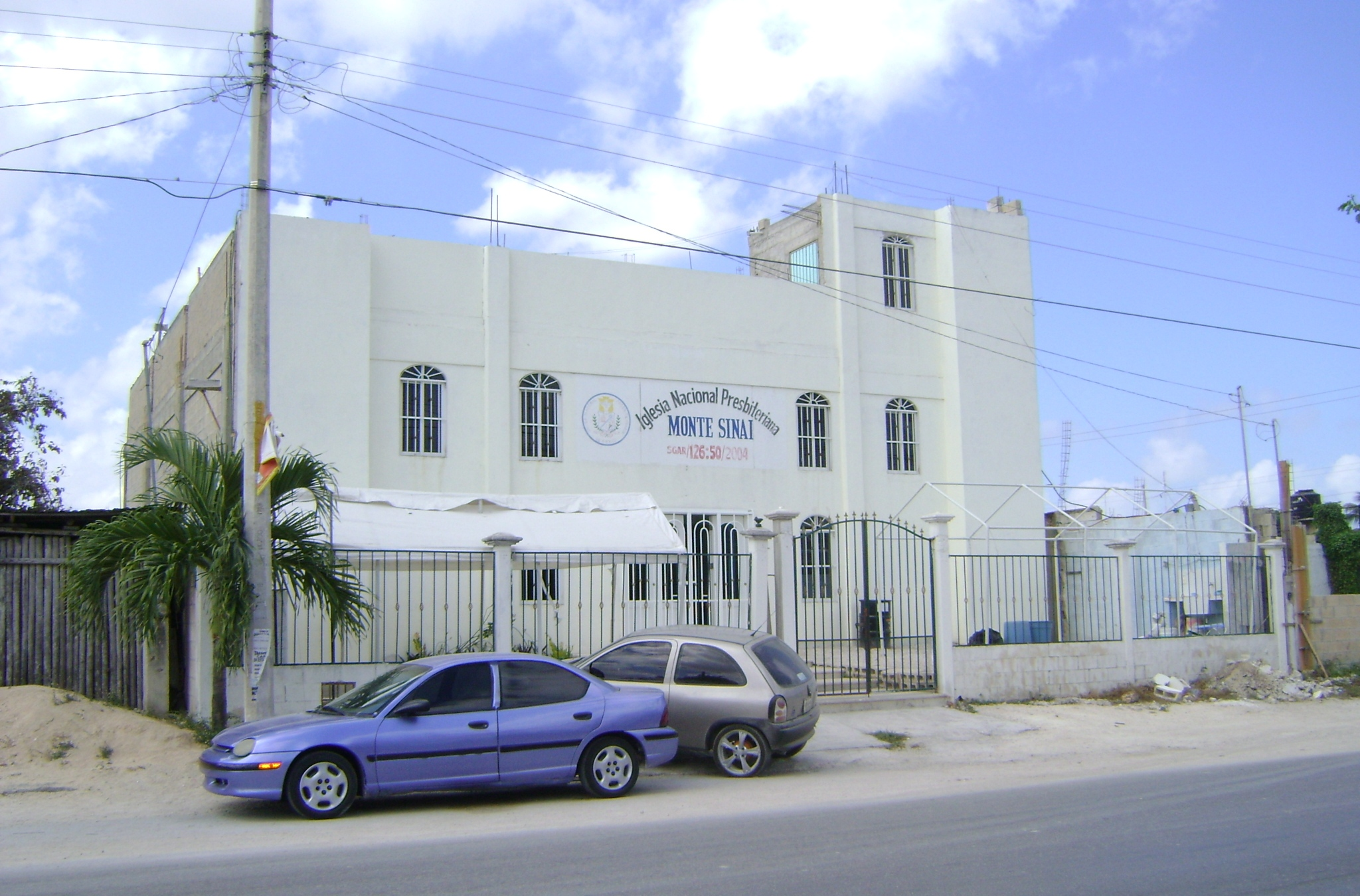
Monte Sínai Presbyterian Church

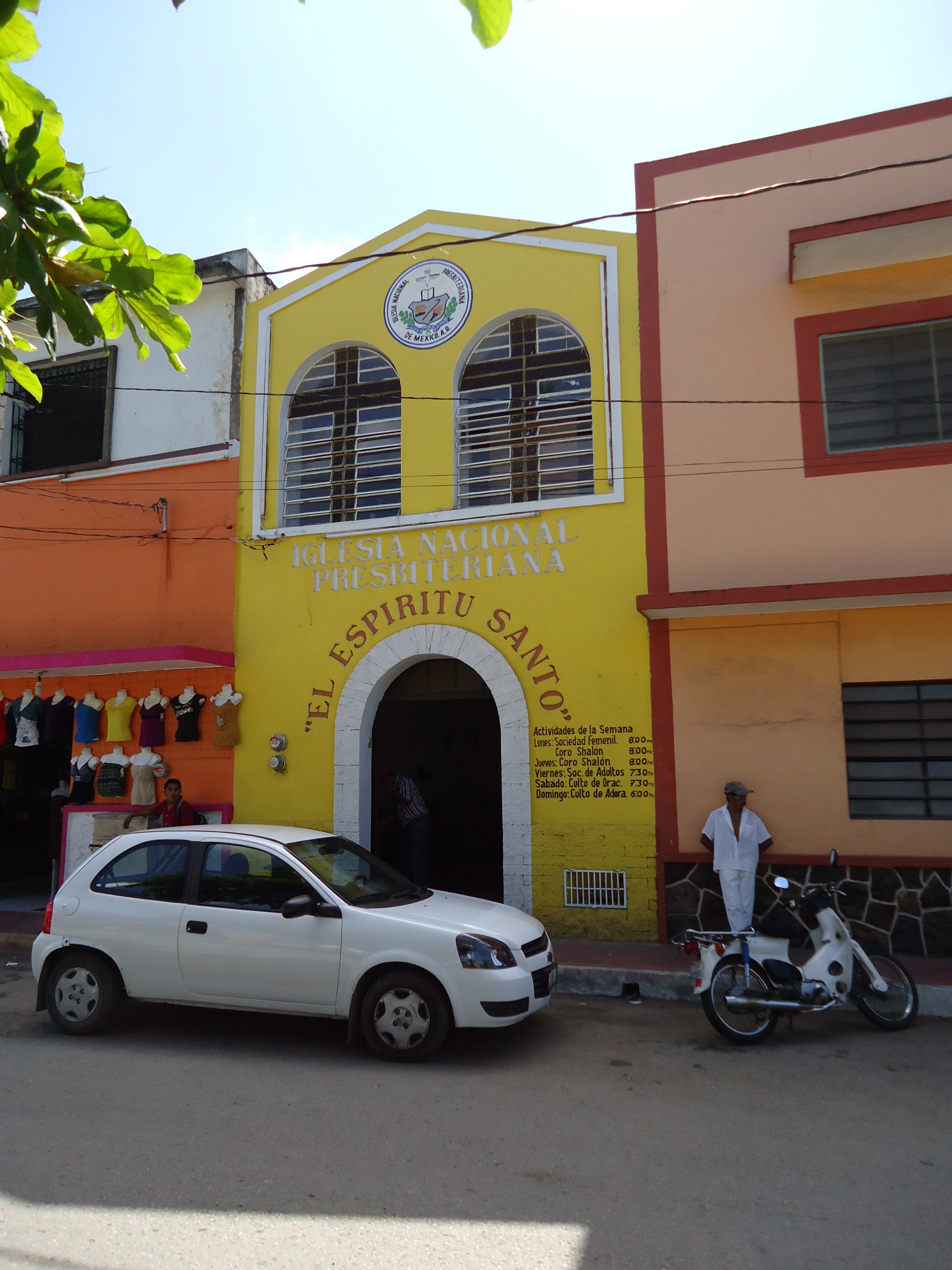
Espiritu santo Presbyterian church in Tizimín

The church is responsible for its own government, and is administered by ruling elders, teaching elders and deacons. The church's highest court is the General Assembly.

The mid-governing body is the presbytery. Currently the National Presbyterian Church in Mexico has 69 presbyteries, scattered across the country.

There are 14 synods, which are:

- The First Synod
- Yucatán Peninsula
- Federal District
- Gulf of Mexico
- Israel
- Showers of Grace
- Center
- Northeast
- Chol
- Tabasco
- Tzeltal of Chiapas
- Southeast Chiapas
- Mexiquense

The latest synod, Guerrero Synod, was formed on November 12, 2012. The synod consists of 3 presbyteries:

- Pacific Presbytery with 9 churches, 11 pastors
- Ebenezer Presbytery with 6 churches and 8 pastors
- Maranatha Presbytery with 7 congregations and 10 pastors.

== Theology ==
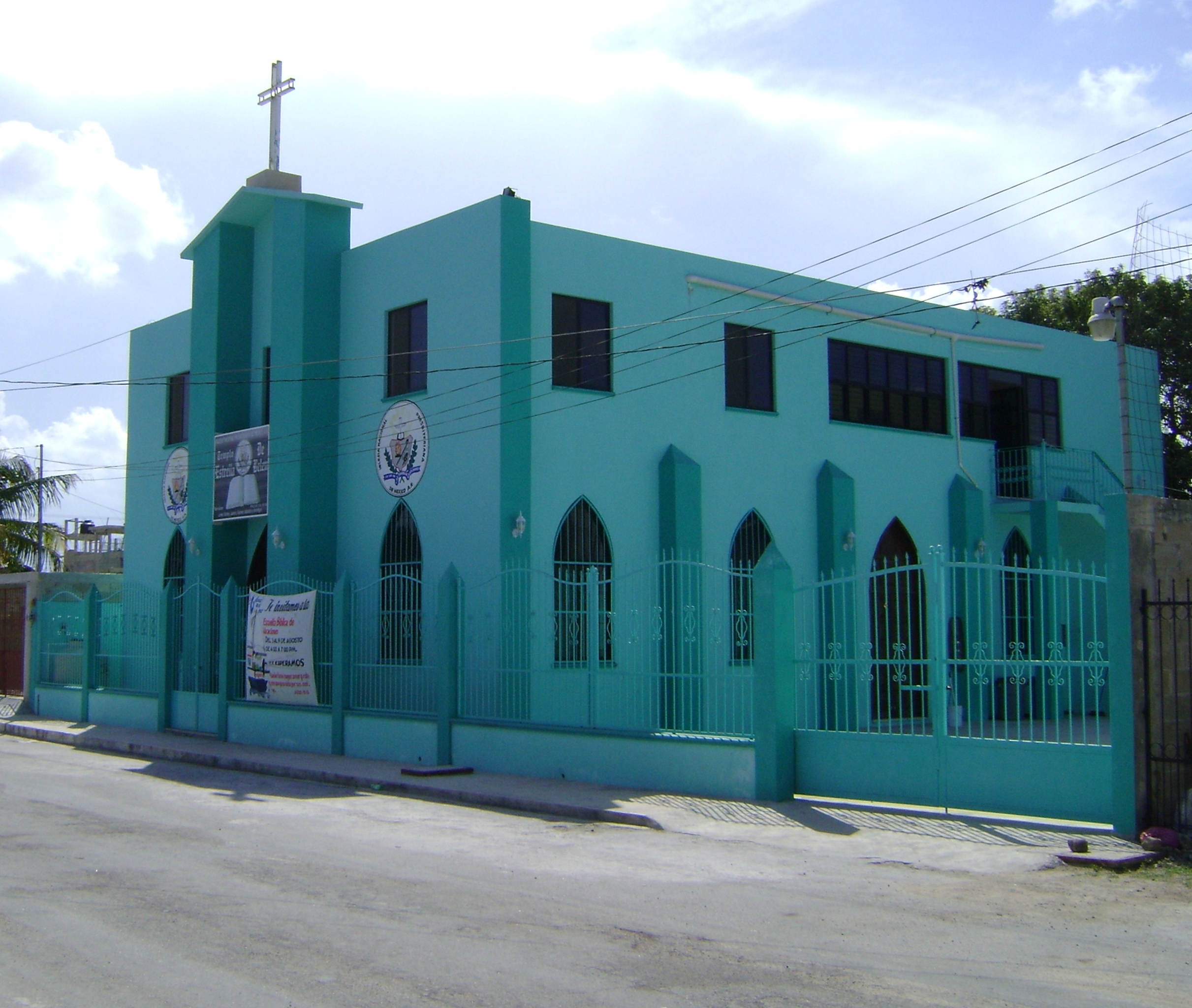
National Presbyterian Church in Cancún

The theology of the church is conservative and creeds and confessions represent its Reformed and Presbyterian heritage. The liturgy is a hybrid – traditional and indigenous hymns are sung, and may be accompanied by organ or piano. The guitar is frequently used, as are metrical psalms.

=== Confessions ===
- Westminster Confession of Faith
- Westminster Shorter Catechism
- Westminster Larger Catechism
- Heidelberg Catechism
- Canons of Dort
- Second Helvetic Confession
- Belgic Confession
- The confession of faith of the Church of Scotland

The Institutes of the Christian Religion by John Calvin is widely used in the churches.

=== Creeds ===
- Apostles' Creed
- Nicene Creed
- Athanasian Creed
- Chalcedonian Definition

== Seminaries and Education ==
- San Pablo Theological Seminary
- Presbyterian Theological Seminary of Mexico
- Juarez Institution
- Movipres Organisation

== Interchurch activities ==
The National Presbyterian Church in Mexico is a member of the World Communion of Reformed Churches and the World Reformed Fellowship. In July 1995, the National Presbyterian Church in Mexico, the Associate Reformed Presbyterian Church in Mexico and The Presbyterian church in Mexico formed the 'Alliance of Presbyterian and Reformed Churches in the Mexican Republic'.

The National Presbyterian Church has a relationship with the Presbyterian Church in America (PCA), the Christian Reformed Church in North America (CRCNA), the Evangelical Presbyterian Church (EPC), and the Reformed Church in America (RCA). It does not have any relationship with the Roman Catholic Church because of what it perceives as the Catholic Church's role in the conquest and oppression of Mexico and its people.

The Presbyterian Church in Chile and the National Presbyterian Church made an agreement of cooperation and planting new churches in Chile.

== Recent issues ==
At its 2011 General Assembly, the National Presbyterian Church in Mexico voted to end its 139-year relationship with the Presbyterian Church (U.S.A.) because it disagreed with its decision to ordain gay and lesbian ministers. The mission partnership between these churches was also dissolved. In the same General Assembly, the Mexican church voted against the ordination of women ministers. The church excluded a woman minister from the National church roll in 2013 ordained by the Communion of Presbyterian and Reformed Communion in Mexico, because differences in ways the Bible is read and understandings of women's role in the church.

== Missions ==
The National Presbyterian Church in Mexico performs missionary work together with the Presbyterian Church in America (PCA) in a US-Mexican border ministry, in the southern parts of Mexico, as well as in the cities of Durango, Monterrey, Guadalajara, Acapulco, and Mexico City. Some Reformed Christian missionaries cooperate and work for the National Presbyterian Church in Mexico.

== Symbols ==
=== Anthem ===
The National Presbyterian Church in Mexico has the hymn Sovereign Lord of the Words, authored by Félix Gómez, as its official anthem.
