= Presbyterianism =

Branch of Protestant Christianity

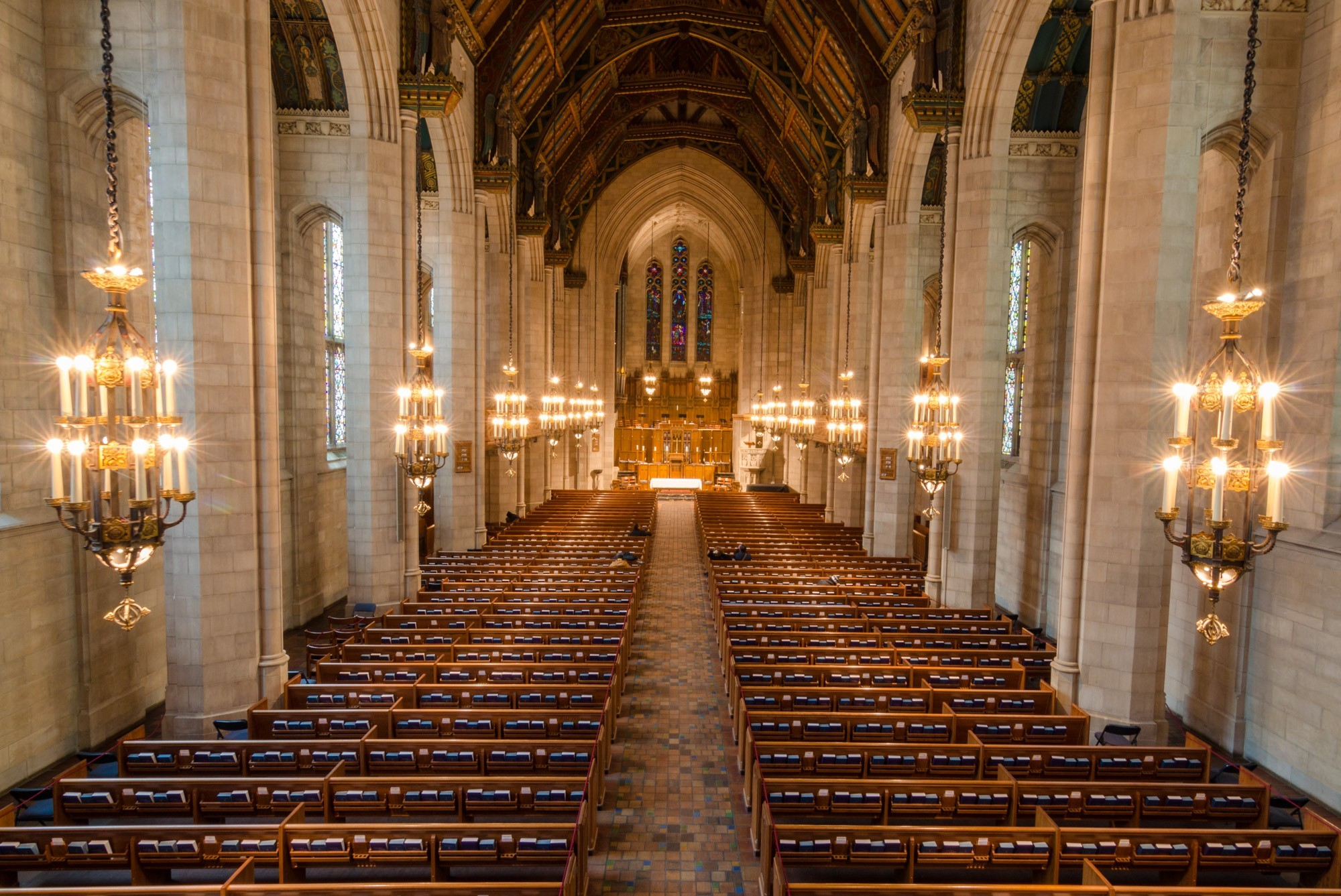
Sanctuary of the Fourth Presbyterian Church (Chicago)

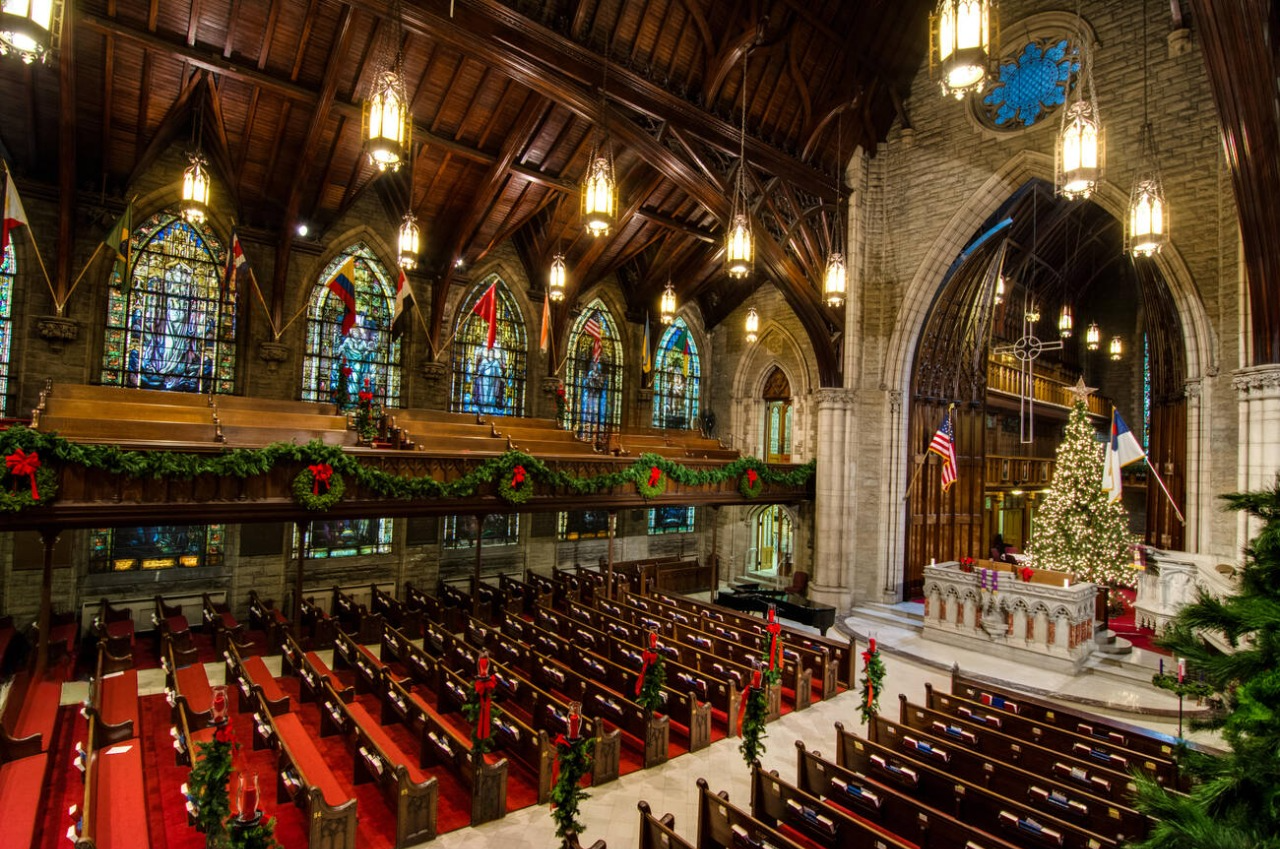
First Presbyterian Church (Pittsburgh)

The burning bush, a common symbol used by Presbyterian churches, used by the Presbyterian Church in Ireland. The Latin inscription underneath translates as "burning but flourishing". Alternative versions of the motto are also used, such as "Nec Tamen Consumebatur" (yet not consumed).

Presbyterianism (/ˌprɛzbəˈtɪriəˌnɪzəm/) is a historically Reformed Protestant tradition named after its form of church government by representative assemblies of elders, known as "presbyters". Now, even though other Reformed churches are structurally similar, the word Presbyterian is applied to churches that trace their roots to the Church of Scotland or to English Dissenter groups that were formed during the English Civil War, 1642 to 1651.

Presbyterian theology typically emphasises the sovereignty of God, the authority of the Scriptures, and the necessity of grace through faith in Christ. The historic doctrine of the Presbyterian Churches is explicated in the Westminster Standards. Scotland ensured Presbyterian church government stayed alive and well in the 1707 Acts of Union, which created the Kingdom of Great Britain. In fact, most Presbyterians in England have a Scottish connection. The Presbyterian denomination was also taken to United States, Canada, Australia, New Zealand and South Africa, mostly by Scots and Scots-Irish immigrants. Scotland's Presbyterian denominations hold to the Reformed theology of John Calvin and his immediate successors, although there is a range of theological views within contemporary Presbyterianism. Local congregations of churches that use Presbyterian polity are governed by sessions made up of representatives of the congregation (elders), a conciliar approach as with other levels of decision-making (presbytery, synod, and general assembly). There are roughly 75 million Presbyterians in the world.

Presbyterianism's roots lie in the Magisterial Reformation of the 16th century. John Calvin's Republic of Geneva was particularly influential, along with Calvin's student, Scottish Reformer John Knox who worked with civil magistrates to establish the Presbyterian Church in Scotland, writing the book of common order and eventually the Scots Confession. Most Reformed churches that trace their history to Scotland are either presbyterian or congregationalist in government. In the 20th century, some Presbyterians played an important role in the ecumenical movement, including the World Council of Churches. Many Presbyterian denominations have found ways of working together with other Reformed denominations and Christians of other traditions, especially in the World Communion of Reformed Churches. Some Presbyterian churches have entered into unions or ecumenical dialogue with other Reformed churches, such as the Continental Reformed and Congregationalists, and even non-Reformed denominations, such as Lutherans, Anglicans, and Methodists. Presbyterians in the United States came largely from Scottish, Scots-Irish immigrants, and also from New England communities that were originally Congregational but changed because of an agreed-upon Plan of Union of 1801 for frontier areas.

== Presbyterian identity ==
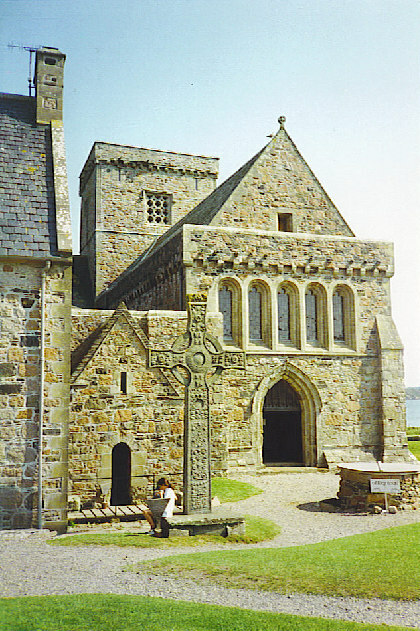
Iona Abbey in Scotland, founded by Saint Columba

=== Early history ===
Presbyterian tradition, particularly that of the Church of Scotland, traces its early roots to the Catholic church of Scotland. It was founded by Saint Columba, through the 6th century Hiberno-Scottish mission. Tracing their apostolic origin to Saint John, the Culdees practiced Christian monasticism, a key feature of Celtic Christianity in the region, with a presbyter exercising "authority within the institution, while the different monastic institutions were independent of one another." The Church in Scotland kept the Christian feast of Easter at a date different from the See of Rome and its monks used a unique style of tonsure. The Synod of Whitby in 664, however, ended these distinctions as it ruled "that Easter would be celebrated according to the Roman date, not the Celtic date." Although Roman influence came to dominate the Church in Scotland, certain Celtic influences remained in the Scottish Church, such as "the singing of metrical psalms, many of them set to old Celtic Christianity Scottish traditional and folk tunes", which later became a "distinctive part of Scottish Presbyterian worship".

=== Development ===
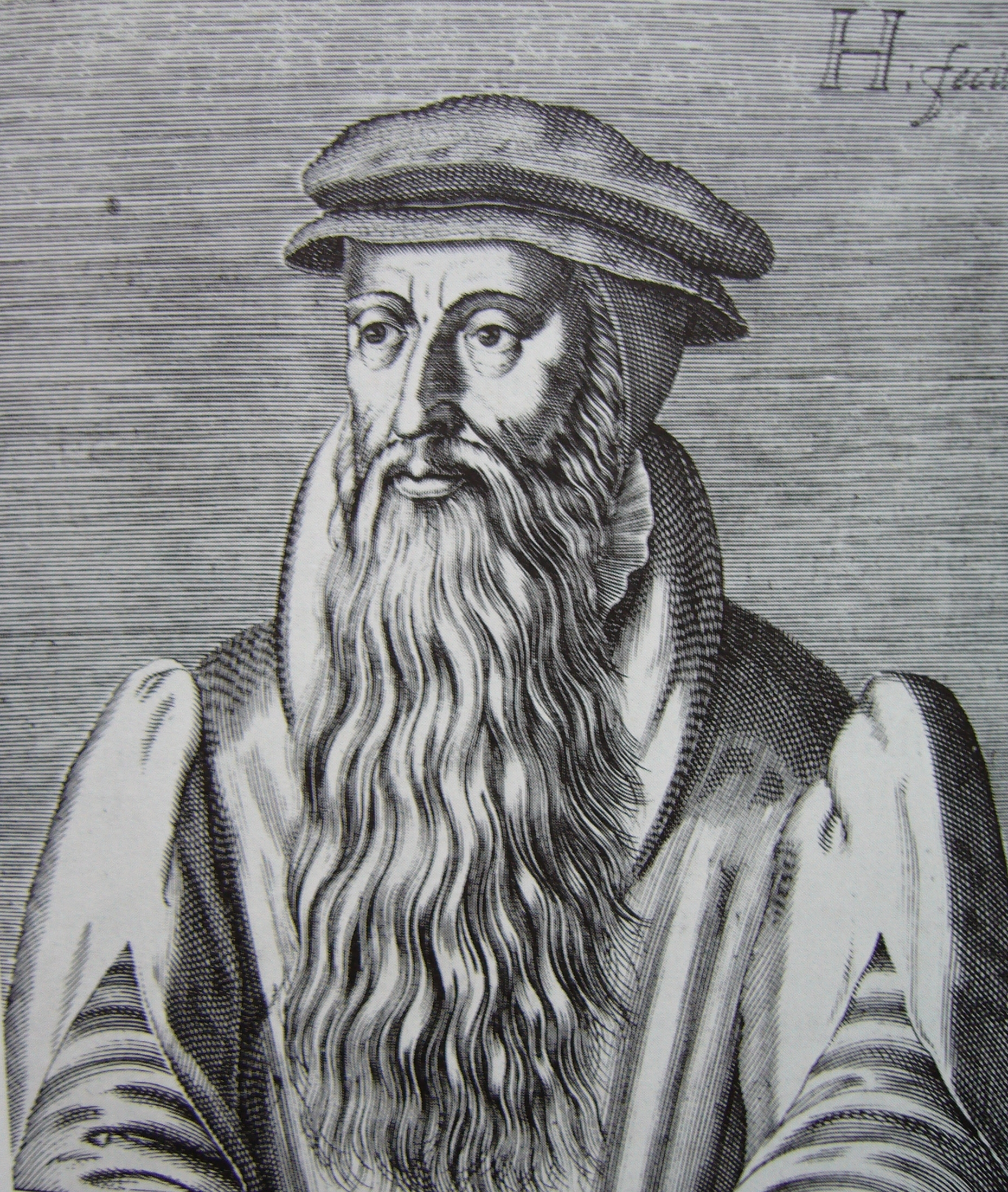
John Knox, leader of the 16th century Scottish Reformation

Presbyterian history is part of the history of Christianity, but the beginning of Presbyterianism as a distinct movement occurred during the 16th century Protestant Reformation. As the Catholic Church resisted the Reformers, several different theological movements splintered from the Church and bore different denominations. The Presbyterian Church (The Church of Scotland) was a direct break off of the Roman Catholic Church as were the Anglican Church and the Lutheran Church.

Presbyterianism was especially influenced by the French theologian John Calvin, who is credited with the development of Reformed theology, and the work of John Knox, a Scottish Catholic Priest who studied with Calvin in Geneva and brought back Reformed teachings to Scotland. An important influence on the formation of Presbyterianism in Britain also came from John a Lasco, a Polish reformer, the founder of a Stranger's Church in London, based on the Geneva models.

The Presbyterian church traces its ancestry primarily to Scotland. In August 1560, the Parliament of Scotland adopted the Scots Confession as the creed of the Scottish Kingdom. In December 1560, the First Book of Discipline was published, outlining important doctrinal issues but also establishing regulations for church government, including the creation of ten ecclesiastical districts with appointed superintendents which later became known as presbyteries.

In time, the Scots Confession would be supplanted by the Westminster Confession of Faith, and the larger and shorter catechisms, which were formulated by the Westminster Assembly between 1643 and 1649.

== Characteristics ==
Presbyterians distinguish themselves from other denominations by doctrine, institutional organisation (or "church order") and worship, often using a "Book of Order" to regulate common practice and order. The origins of the Presbyterian churches are in Reformed Christianity, also called Calvinism. Many branches of Presbyterianism are remnants of previous splits from larger groups. Some of the splits have been due to doctrinal controversy, while others have been caused by disagreement concerning the degree to which those ordained to church office should be required to agree with the Westminster Confession of Faith, which historically served as an important confessional document—second only to the Bible, yet directing particularities in the standardisation and translation of the Bible—in Presbyterian churches.

Presbyterians place importance on education and lifelong learning, tempered with the belief that no human action can affect salvation.

Continuous study of the scriptures, theological writings, and understanding and interpretation of church doctrine are embodied in several statements of faith and catechisms formally adopted by various branches of the church, often referred to as "subordinate standards".

=== Government ===
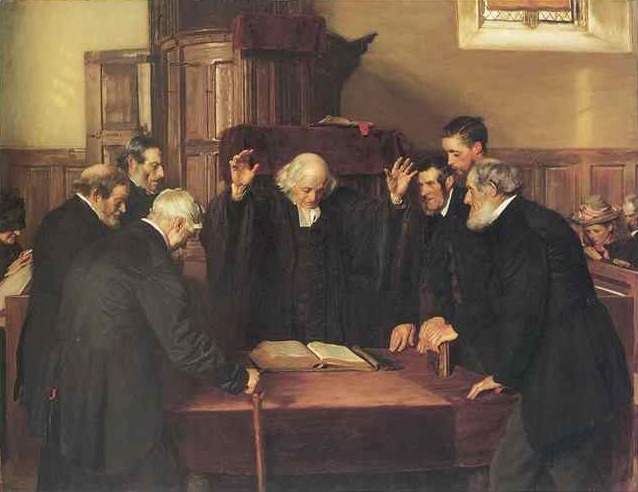
Painting by John Henry Lorimer, The Ordination of Elders in a Scottish Kirk, 1891, now in the National Gallery of Scotland

Presbyterian government is by councils (still known as courts in some countries, as boards in others) of elders. Teaching and ruling elders are ordained and convene in the lowest council known as a session or consistory responsible for the discipline, nurture, and mission of the local congregation. Teaching elders (pastors or ministers) have responsibility for teaching, worship, and performing sacraments. Pastors or ministers are called by individual congregations. A congregation issues a call for the pastor or minister's service, but this call must be ratified by the local presbytery. The pastor or minister is a teaching elder, and Moderator of the Session, but is not usually a member of the congregation; instead, this person is a member of the Presbytery of which the given church is a member.

Ruling elders are elected by the congregation and ordained to serve with the teaching elders, assuming responsibility for the nurture and leadership of the congregation. Often, especially in larger congregations, the elders delegate the practicalities of buildings, finance, and temporal ministry to the needy in the congregation to a distinct group of officers (sometimes called deacons, which are ordained in some denominations). This group may variously be known as a "Deacon Board", "Board of Deacons" "Diaconate", or "Deacons' Court". These are sometimes known as "presbyters" to the full congregation. Since the 20th century, most denominations allow women to be teaching or ruling elders.

Above the sessions exist presbyteries, which have area responsibilities. These are composed of teaching elders and ruling elders from each of the constituent congregations. The presbytery sends representatives to a broader regional or national assembly, generally known as the General Assembly, although an intermediate level of a synod sometimes exists. This congregation / presbytery / synod / general assembly schema is based on the historical structure of the larger Presbyterian churches, such as the Church of Scotland or the Presbyterian Church (U.S.A.); some bodies, such as the Presbyterian Church in America and the Presbyterian Church in Ireland, skip one of the steps between congregation and General Assembly, and usually the step skipped is the Synod. The Church of Scotland abolished the Synod in 1993.

Presbyterian governance is practiced by Presbyterian denominations and also by many other Reformed churches.

=== Doctrine ===
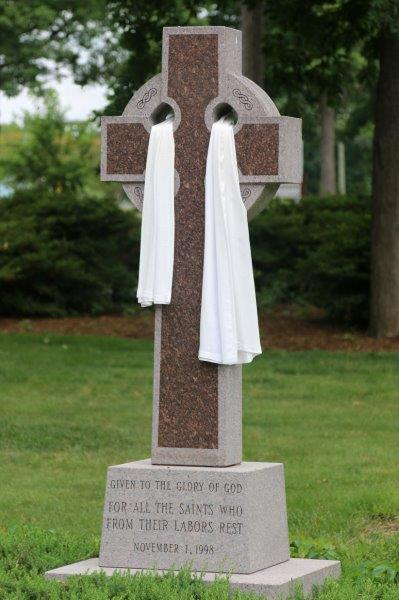
A Celtic cross draped for Easter at a Presbyterian church in Virginia

A Presbyterian Cross, used by the National Cemetery Administration, a division of the U.S. Department of Veterans Affairs

Presbyterianism is historically a confessional tradition. Confessional churches express their faith in the form of "confessions of faith", which have some level of authoritative status. In confessional churches, theology is not solely an individual matter. While individuals are encouraged to understand Scripture, and may challenge the current institutional understanding, theology is carried out by the community as a whole. It is this community understanding of theology that is expressed in confessions.

There is a spectrum of approaches to confessionalism. The manner of subscription, or the degree to which the official standards establish the actual doctrine of the church, is a practical matter leading to the decisions rendered in ordination and in the courts of the church to largely determine what the church means, representing the whole, by its adherence to the doctrinal standard.

Some Presbyterian traditions adopt only the Westminster Confession of Faith as the doctrinal standard to which teaching elders are required to subscribe, in contrast to the Larger and Shorter catechisms, which are approved for use in instruction. Many Presbyterian denominations, especially in North America, have adopted all of the Westminster Standards as their standard of doctrine which is subordinate to the Bible. These documents are Calvinist in their doctrinal orientation. The Presbyterian Church in Canada retains the Westminster Confession of Faith in its original form, while admitting the historical period in which it was written should be understood when it is read.

The Westminster Confession is "The principal subordinate standard of the Church of Scotland" but "with due regard to liberty of opinion in points which do not enter into the substance of the Faith" (V). This formulation represents many years of struggle over the extent to which the confession reflects the Word of God and the struggle of conscience of those who came to believe it did not fully do so (e.g. William Robertson Smith). Some Presbyterian churches, such as the Free Church of Scotland, have no such "conscience clause".

The Presbyterian Church (U.S.A.) has adopted the Book of Confessions, which reflects the inclusion of other Reformed confessions in addition to the Westminster Standards. These other documents include ancient creedal statements (the Nicene Creed, the Apostles' Creed), 16th-century Reformed confessions (the Scots Confession, the Heidelberg Catechism, the Second Helvetic Confession), and 20th century documents (The Theological Declaration of Barmen, Confession of 1967 and A Brief Statement of Faith).

The Presbyterian Church in Canada developed the confessional document Living Faith (1984) and retains it as a subordinate standard of the denomination. It is confessional in format, yet like the Westminster Confession, draws attention to original Bible text.

Presbyterians in Ireland who rejected Calvinism and the Westminster Confessions formed the Non-subscribing Presbyterian Church of Ireland.

John Gresham Machen, the prominent Presbyterian theologian and Professor of New Testament at Princeton Seminary between 1906 and 1929, led a revolt against modernist doctrine in his Christianity and Liberalism (1923) that critiqued theological modernism. He argued that modernism and liberal theology was a false religion, a pretender that cloaks itself in Christian language – "Liberalism". This religion, he claimed, is a marriage of naturalism, humanism, secularism, and sentimentalism all rolled into one.

=== Worship and sacraments ===
==== Worship ====
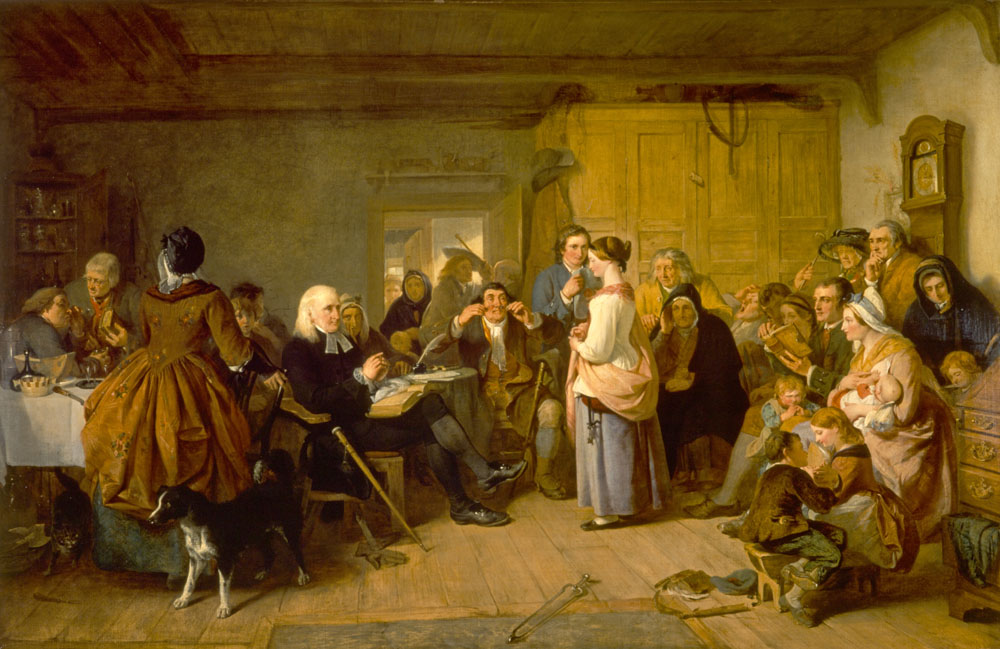
Presbyterian catechising in the 19th century

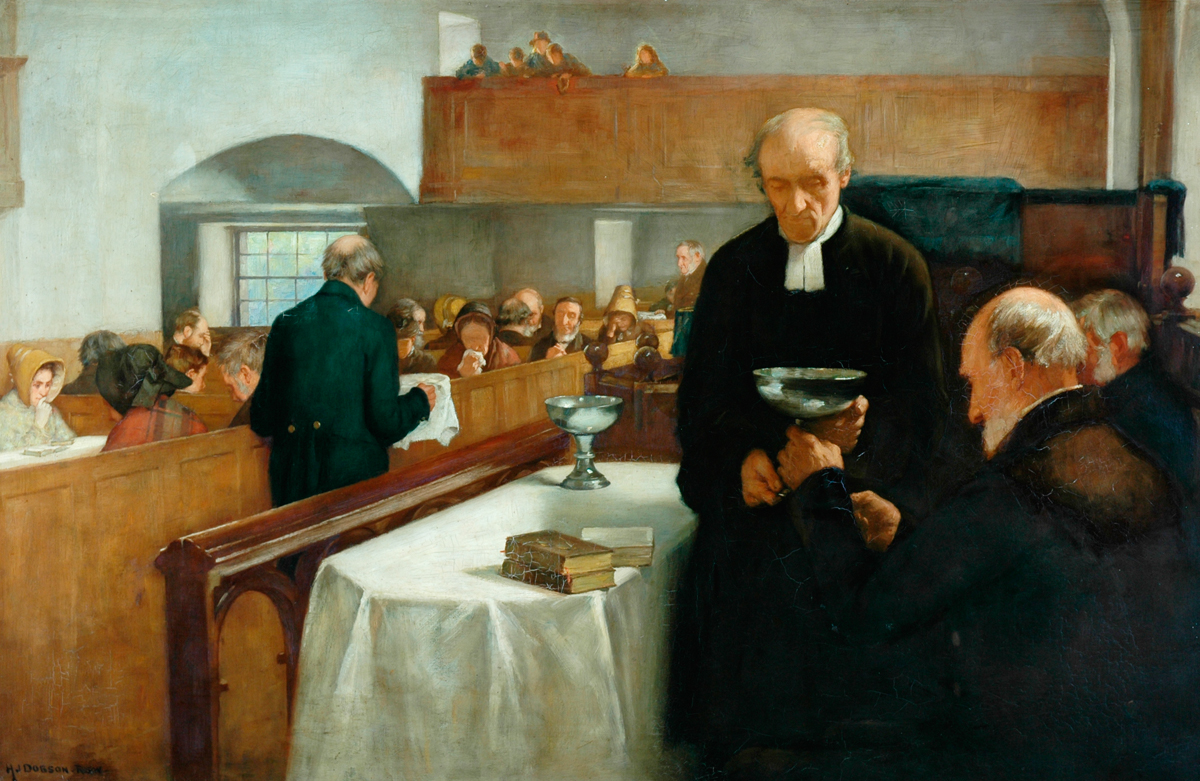
A Scottish Sacrament, a portrait by Henry John Dobson

Presbyterian denominations that trace their heritage to the British Isles usually organise their church services inspired by the principles in the Directory of Public Worship, developed by the Westminster Assembly in the 1640s. This directory documented Reformed worship practices and theology adopted and developed over the preceding century by British Puritans, initially guided by John Calvin and John Knox. It was enacted as law by the Parliament of Scotland, and became one of the foundational documents of Presbyterian church legislation elsewhere.

Historically, the driving principle in the development of the standards of Presbyterian worship is the Regulative principle of worship, which specifies that (in worship), what is not commanded is forbidden.

Over subsequent centuries, many Presbyterian churches modified these prescriptions by introducing hymnody, instrumental accompaniment, and ceremonial vestments into worship. However, there is not one fixed "Presbyterian" worship style. Although there are set services for the Lord's Day in keeping with first-day Sabbatarianism, one can find a service to be evangelical and even revivalist in tone (especially in some conservative denominations), or strongly liturgical, approximating the practices of Lutheranism or more of Anglicanism, or semi-formal, allowing for a balance of hymns, preaching, and congregational participation (favored by many American Presbyterians). Most Presbyterian churches follow the traditional liturgical year and observe the traditional holidays, holy seasons, such as Advent, Christmas, Ash Wednesday, Holy Week, Easter, Pentecost, etc. They also make use of the appropriate seasonal liturgical colors, etc. Many incorporate ancient liturgical prayers and responses into the communion services and follow a daily, seasonal, and festival lectionary. Other Presbyterians, however, such as the Reformed Presbyterians, would practice a cappella exclusive psalmody, as well as eschew the celebration of holy days.

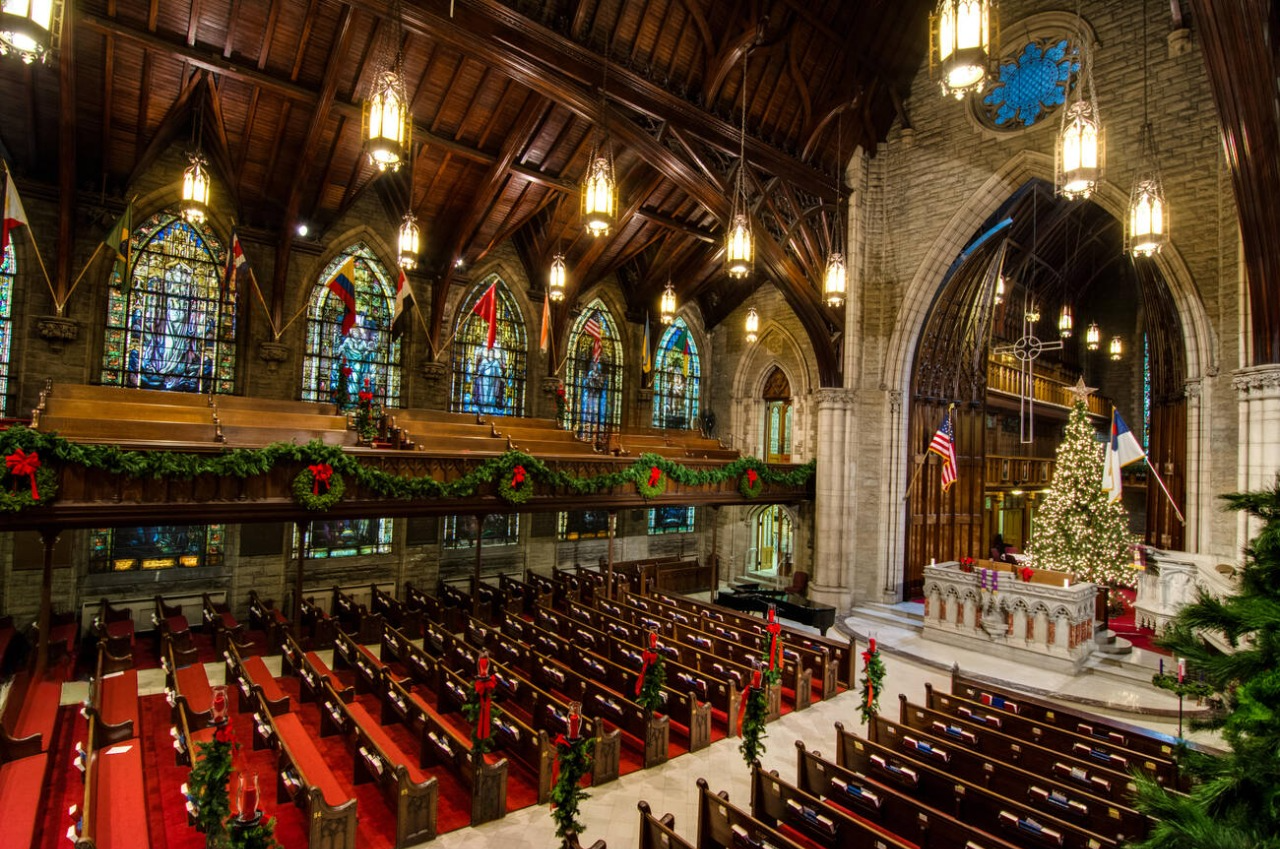
First Presbyterian Church of Pittsburgh (Conservative PCUSA Church)

Among the paleo-orthodox and emerging church movements in Protestant and evangelical churches, in which some Presbyterians are involved, clergy are moving away from the traditional black Geneva gown to such vestments as the alb and chasuble, but also cassock and surplice (typically a full-length Old English style surplice which resembles the Celtic alb, an ungirdled liturgical tunic of the old Gallican Rite), which some, particularly those identifying with the Liturgical Renewal Movement, hold to be more ancient and representative of a more ecumenical past.

==== Sacraments ====
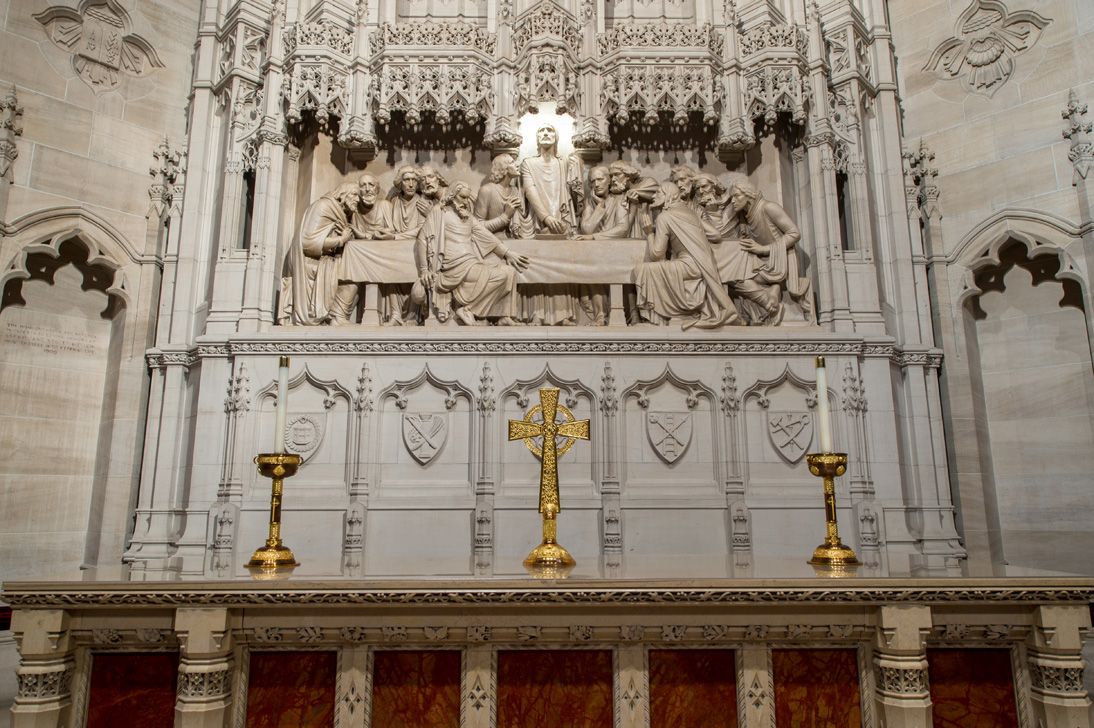
Presbyterian Church Communion Table

Presbyterians traditionally have held the Worship position that there are only two sacraments:

- Baptism, in which they baptize infants, as well as unbaptized adults by the Aspersion (sprinkling) or Affusion (pouring) method in the name of the Father and of the Son and of the Holy Spirit, rather than the Immersion method.
- The Lord's Supper (also known as Communion), in which Presbyterians believe in the Real Presence of Christ (pneumatic presence) in the spiritual sense, in the bread and wine through the Holy Spirit, as opposed to being locally present as in transubstantiation.

=== Marriage ===
Most Presbyterian Churches in the world, such as the Free Presbyterian Church of Scotland and the Free Presbyterian Church of North America, only support marriage between a man and a woman.

Some Presbyterian Churches allow local churches to decide about blessings of same-sex marriage, such as the Presbyterian Church (USA), the Uniting Presbyterian Church in Southern Africa and the Presbyterian Church in Canada.

== Architecture ==
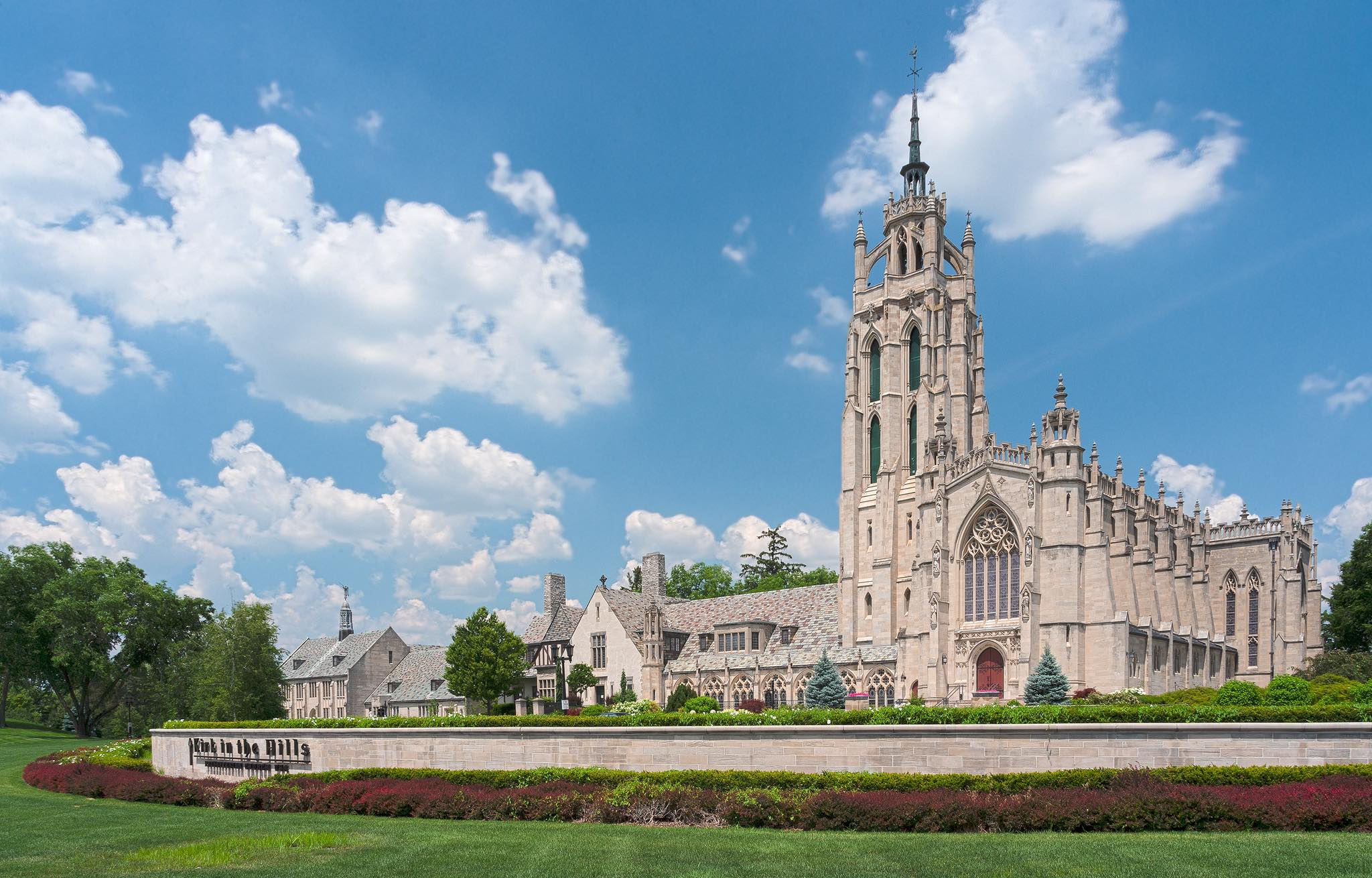
Kirk in the Hills Presbyterian Church, Bloomfield Township, Michigan, USA

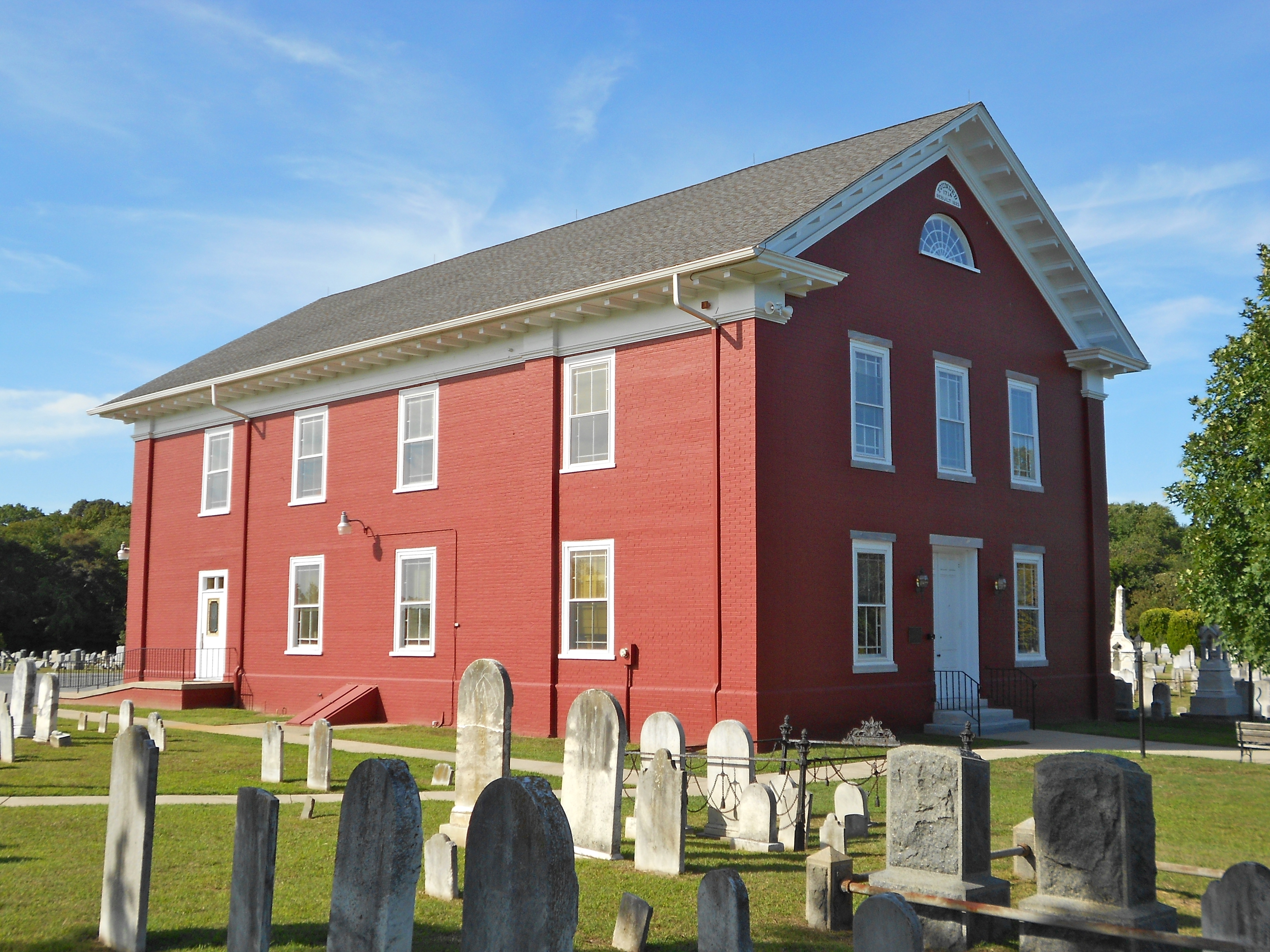
Cold Spring Presbyterian Church, rebuilt in 1823, near Cape May County, New Jersey

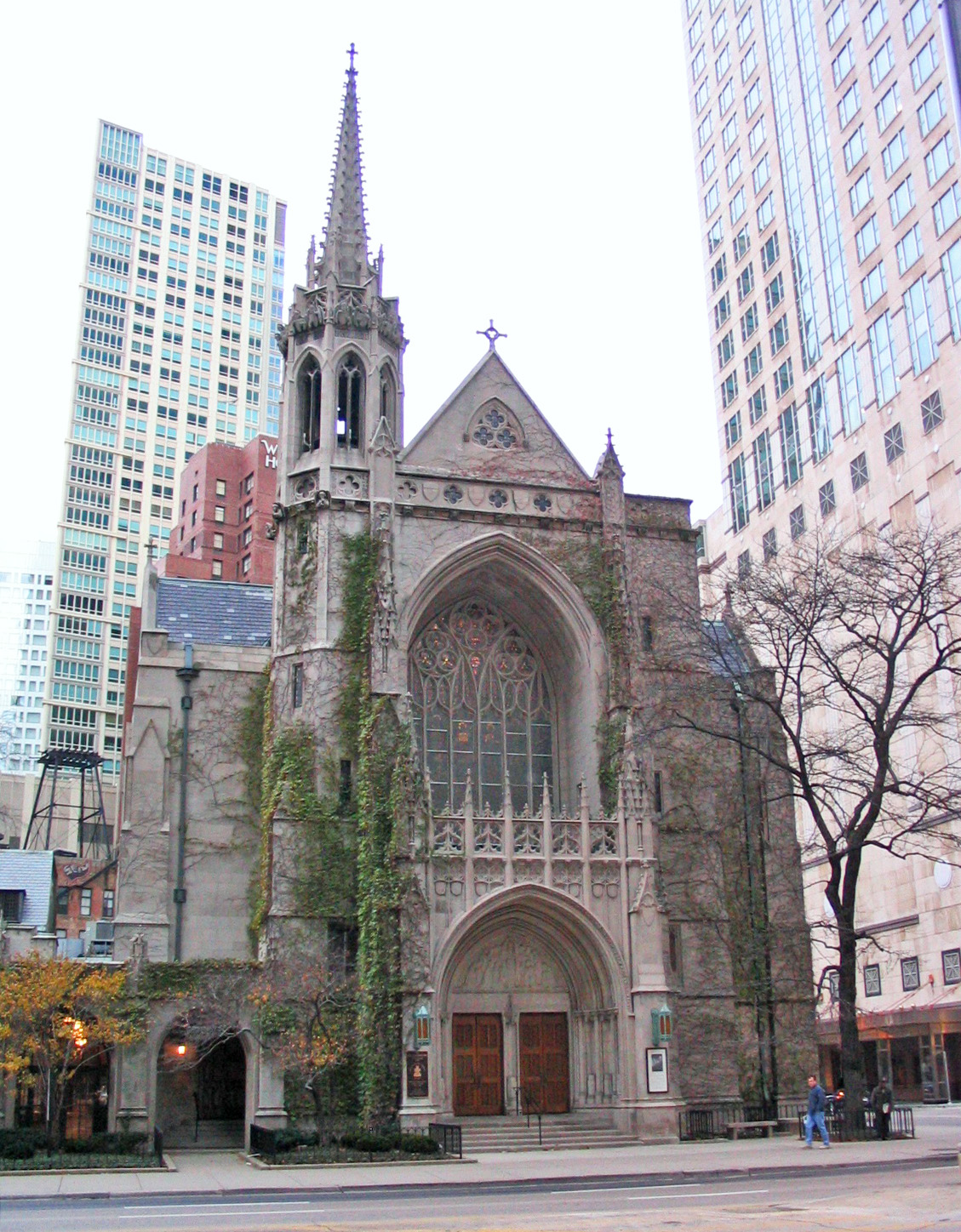
The Fourth Presbyterian Church in Chicago, built in 1914

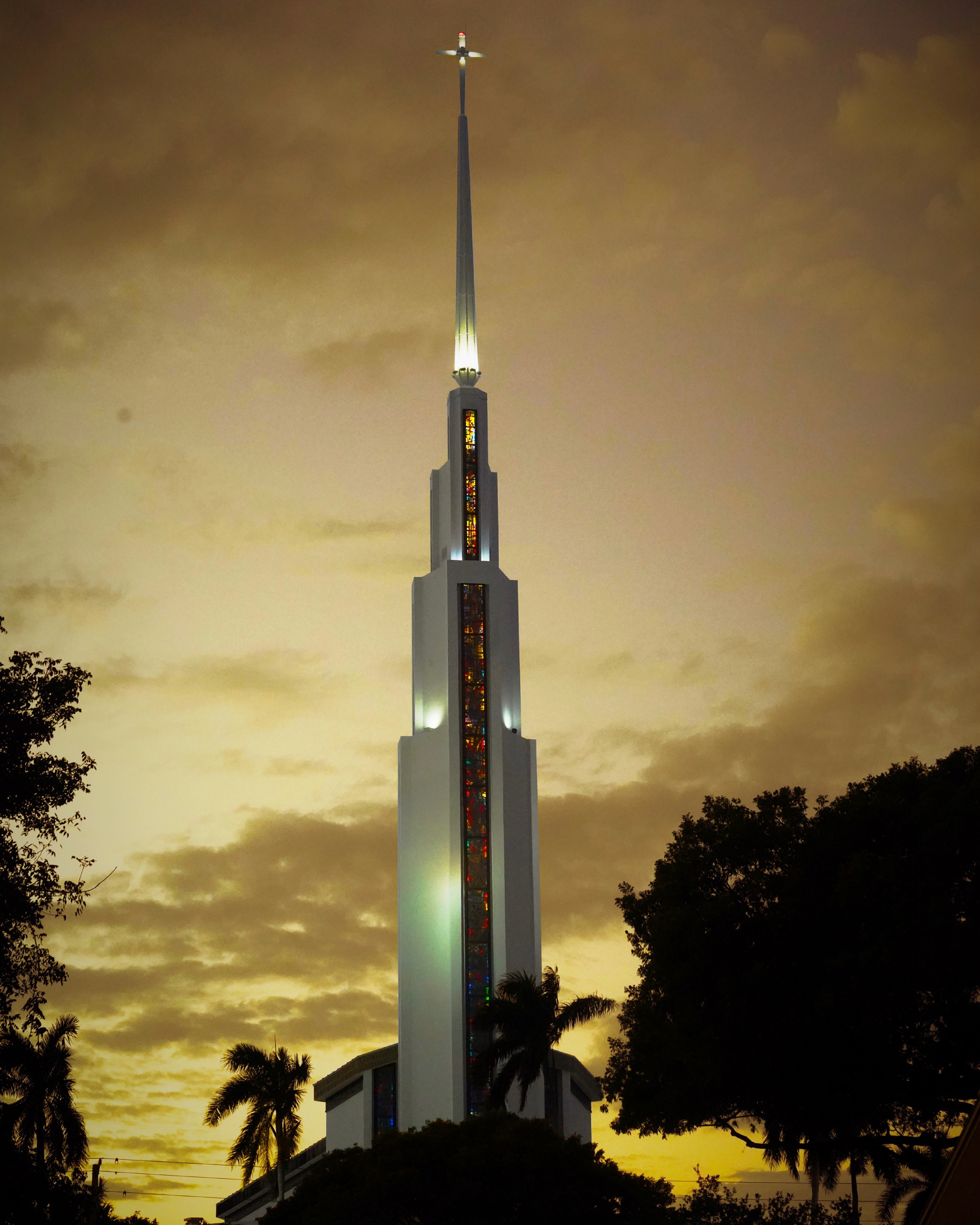
Coral Ridge Presbyterian Church, Fort Lauderdale, FL, USA, built in the 1970s, an example of modern church architecture

Some early Presbyterians, which were influenced by the puritan movement, were careful to distinguish between the "church", which referred to the members, and the "meeting house", which was the building in which the church met. (Quakers still insist upon this distinction.) Until the late 19th century, very few Presbyterians ever referred to their buildings as "churches". Presbyterians believed that meeting-houses (now called churches) are buildings to support the worship of God. The decor in some instances was austere so as not to detract from worship. Early Presbyterian meeting-houses were extremely plain. No stained glass, no elaborate furnishings, and no images were to be found in the meeting-house. The pulpit, often raised so as only to be accessible by a staircase, was the centerpiece of the building. But these were not the standard characteristics of the mainline Presbyterians. These were more of the wave of Presbyterians that were influenced by the Puritans.

In the late 19th century a gradual shift began to occur. Prosperous congregations built imposing churches, such as Fourth Presbyterian Church of Chicago, Brick Presbyterian Church in New York City, Shadyside Presbyterian Church in Pennsylvania, St Stephen Presbyterian in Fort Worth, Texas, and many others.

While Presbyterian churches historically reflected prevailing architectural trends, the 20th century saw a greater embrace of modern architectural styles, particularly the modernist movement characterized by clean lines, geometric shapes, and open floor plans. Prominent examples include Coral Ridge Presbyterian Church in Fort Lauderdale, Florida, with expansive, light-filled sanctuary and angular design elements. Similarly, the National Presbyterian Church in Washington, D.C., features a striking facade clad in limestone and punctuated by large windows, alongside abstract stained-glass windows. Both of these were designed by famed architect Harold E. Wagoner.

Usually a Presbyterian church will not have statues of saints, nor the ornate altar more typical of a Catholic church. Instead, there is a "communion table", usually on the same level as the congregation, and sometimes elevated similar to an altar, however surrounded by the chancel. There may be a rail between the communion table and the chancel behind it, which may contain a more decorative altar-type table, choir loft, or choir stalls, lectern and clergy area. The altar is called the communion table, and the altar area is called the chancel by Presbyterians. In Presbyterian, and in Reformed churches, there may be an altar cross, either on the communion table or on a table in the chancel. By using the "empty" cross, or cross of the Westminster/Celtic cross, Presbyterians emphasize the resurrection and that Christ is not continually dying, but died once and is alive for all eternity. Quite a few Presbyterian church buildings are decorated with a cross, that has a circle around the center, or Celtic cross. This not only emphasizes the resurrection, but also acknowledges historical aspects of Presbyterianism. A baptismal font will be located either at the entrance or near the chancel area. Presbyterian architecture generally makes significant use of symbolism. One may also find decorative and ornate stained glass windows depicting scenes from the Bible. Some Presbyterian churches will also have ornate statues of Christ or graven scenes from the Last Supper located behind the chancel. St. Giles' Cathedral in Scotland has a crucifix next to an ornate elevated communion table that hangs alongside. The image of Christ is more of a faint image, with a more modern design.

== By region ==
=== Europe ===
==== Scotland ====
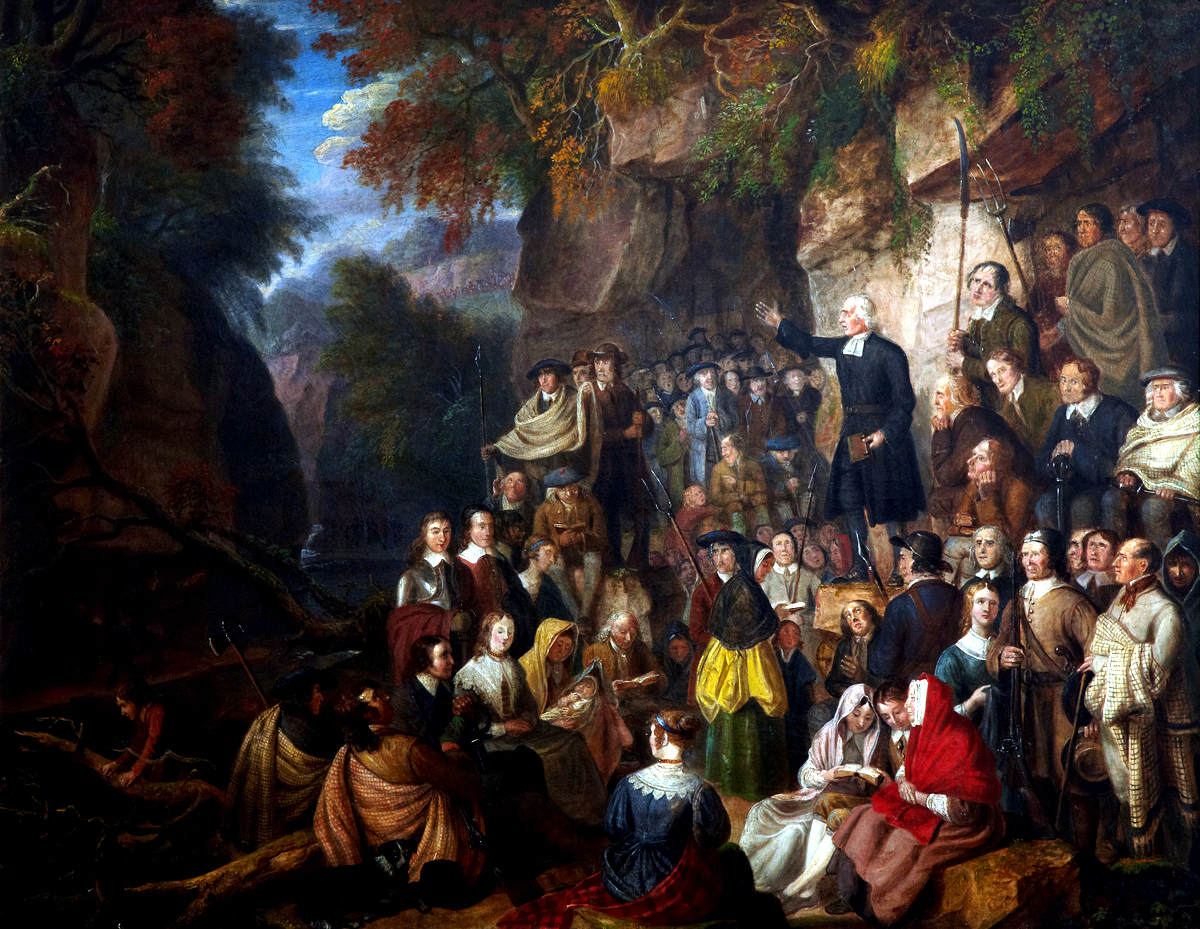
Covenanters in a Glen, a depiction of an illegal conventicle

John Knox (1505–1572), a Scot who had spent time studying under Calvin in Geneva, returned to Scotland and urged his countrymen to reform the Church in line with Calvinist doctrines. After a period of religious convulsion and political conflict culminating in a victory for the Protestant party at the Siege of Leith the authority of the Catholic Church was abolished in favour of Reformation by the legislation of the Scottish Reformation Parliament in 1560. The Church was eventually organised by Andrew Melville along Presbyterian lines to become the national Church of Scotland. King James VI and I moved the Church of Scotland towards an episcopal form of government, and in 1637, James's successor, Charles I, and William Laud, the Archbishop of Canterbury, attempted to force the Church of Scotland to use the Book of Common Prayer. What resulted was an armed insurrection, with many Scots signing the Solemn League and Covenant. The Covenanters would serve as the government of Scotland for nearly a decade, and would also send military support to the Parliamentarians during the English Civil War. Following the restoration of the monarchy in 1660, Charles II, despite the initial support that he received from the Covenanters, reinstated an episcopal form of government on the church.

However, with the Glorious Revolution of 1688 the Church of Scotland was unequivocally recognised as a Presbyterian institution by the monarch due to Scottish Presbyterian support for the aforementioned revolution and the Acts of Union 1707 between Scotland and England guaranteed the Church of Scotland's form of government. However, legislation by the United Kingdom parliament allowing patronage led to splits in the Church. In 1733, a group of ministers seceded from the Church of Scotland to form the Associate Presbytery, another group seceded in 1761 to form the Relief Church and the Disruption of 1843 led to the formation of the Free Church of Scotland. Further splits took place, especially over theological issues, but most Presbyterians in Scotland were reunited by the 1929 union of the established Church of Scotland and the United Free Church of Scotland.

There are today ten Presbyterian denominations in Scotland. These are, listed by number of congregations within Scotland: the Church of Scotland, the Free Church of Scotland, the United Free Church of Scotland, the Free Presbyterian Church of Scotland, the Free Church of Scotland (Continuing), the Didasko Presbytery, the Associated Presbyterian Church, the Reformed Presbyterian Church of Scotland, the International Presbyterian Church and two congregations of the Free Presbyterian Church of Ulster. Combined, they have over 1500 congregations in Scotland.

Within Scotland the term "kirk" is usually used to refer to a local Presbyterian church. Informally, the term "The Kirk" refers to the Church of Scotland. Some of the values and ideals espoused in Scottish Presbyterian denominations can be reflected in this reference in a book from Norman Drummond, chaplain to the Queen in Scotland.

Chart of splits and mergers of the Scottish Presbyterian churches

Splits and mergers of the Scottish Presbyterian churches

Church of Scotland (1560)
Covenanters (1661)
Church of Scotland (1688)
Episcopalians (1689)
RPCS (1690)
Scottish Episcopal Church (1711)
Associate Presbytery (1733)
Burghers (1747)	Anti-Burghers (1747)
Relief Church (1761)
New Lights (1800s)
United Secession Church (1820)
Church of Scotland (1822)
Original; Secession; Church (1827)
Church of Scotland (1839)
Free Church of Scotland (1843)
United; Presbyterian; Church (1847)
Free Church of Scotland (1852)
Free Church of Scotland (1876)
Free Presbyterian Church of Scotland (1893)
United Free Church of Scotland (1900)	Free Church of Scotland (1900)
Church of Scotland (1929)
Church of Scotland (1956)
Associated; Presbyterian; Churches (1989)
Free; Church of Scotland (Continuing) (2000)
Didasko (2017)

==== England ====
In England, Presbyterianism was established in secret in 1592. Thomas Cartwright is thought to be the first Presbyterian in England. Cartwright's controversial lectures at Cambridge University condemning the episcopal hierarchy of the Elizabethan Church led to his deprivation of his post by Archbishop John Whitgift and his emigration abroad. Between 1645 and 1648, a series of ordinances of the Long Parliament established Presbyterianism as the polity of the Church of England. Presbyterian government was established in London and Lancashire and in a few other places in England, although Presbyterian hostility to the execution of Charles I and the establishment of the republican Commonwealth of England meant that Parliament never enforced the Presbyterian system in England. The Restoration of the monarchy in 1660 brought the return of Episcopal church government in England (and in Scotland for a short time); but the Presbyterian church in England continued in Non-Conformity, outside of the established church. In 1719 a major split, the Salter's Hall controversy, occurred; with the majority siding with nontrinitarian views. Thomas Bradbury published several sermons bearing on the controversy, and in 1719, "An answer to the reproaches cast on the dissenting ministers who subscribed their belief of the Eternal Trinity." By the 18th century many English Presbyterian congregations had become Unitarian in doctrine.

A number of new Presbyterian Churches were founded by Scottish immigrants to England in the 19th century and later. Following the 'Disruption' in 1843 many of those linked to the Church of Scotland eventually joined what became the Presbyterian Church of England in 1876. Some, such as Crown Court (Covent Garden, London), St Andrew's (Stepney, London) and Swallow Street (London), did not join the English denomination, which is why there are Church of Scotland congregations in England such as those at Crown Court, and St Columba's, Pont Street (Knightsbridge) in London. There is also a congregation in the heart of London's financial district called London City Presbyterian Church that is affiliated with the Free Church of Scotland. The Free Presbyterian Church of Scotland also have a congregation in London, as do the Free Presbyterian Church of Ulster – along with five others in England.

In 1972, the Presbyterian Church of England (PCofE) united with the Congregational Church in England and Wales to form the United Reformed Church (URC). Among the congregations the PCofE brought to the URC were Tunley (Lancashire), Aston Tirrold (Oxfordshire) and John Knox Presbyterian Church, Stepney, London (now part of Stepney Meeting House URC) – these are among the sole survivors today of the English Presbyterian churches of the 17th century. The URC also has a presence in Scotland, mostly of former Congregationalist Churches. Two former Presbyterian congregations, St Columba's, Cambridge (founded in 1879), and St Columba's, Oxford (founded as a chaplaincy by the PCofE and the Church of Scotland in 1908 and as a congregation of the PCofE in 1929), continue as congregations of the URC and university chaplaincies of the Church of Scotland.

In recent years a number of smaller denominations adopting Presbyterian forms of church government have organised in England, including the International Presbyterian Church planted by evangelical theologian Francis Schaeffer of the L'Abri Fellowship in the 1970s – now with fifteen English-speaking congregations in England, and 6 Korean-speaking congregations. There is also the Evangelical Presbyterian Church in England and Wales founded in the North of England in the late 1980s.

==== Wales ====
In Wales, Presbyterianism is represented by the Presbyterian Church of Wales, which was originally composed largely of Calvinistic Methodists who accepted Calvinist theology rather than the Arminianism of the Wesleyan Methodists. They broke off from the Church of England in 1811, ordaining their own ministers. They were originally known as the Calvinist Methodist connexion and in the 1920s it became alternatively known as the Presbyterian Church of Wales.

==== Ireland ====
Presbyterianism (Irish: Preispitéireachas, Ulster Scots: Prisbytairinism) is the largest Protestant denomination in Northern Ireland and the second largest on the island of Ireland (after the Anglican Church of Ireland), and was brought by Scottish plantation settlers to Ulster who had been strongly encouraged to emigrate by James VI of Scotland, also James I of Ireland and England. After the start of the plantation of Ulster in 1606, several thousand Scottish Presbyterians moved to the northern counties of Ireland. The first official Presbyterian gathering in Ireland was held in 1613. The Presbytery of Ulster was formed in 1642 separately from the established Anglican Church; by 1659 there were nearly 80 presbyteries. By 1715, the northern province of Ulster had a population of 600,000; more than 200,000 of these came from Scotland.

Presbyterians, along with Catholics in Ulster and the rest of Ireland, suffered under the discriminatory Penal Laws until they were revoked in the early 19th century. Presbyterianism is represented in Ireland by the Presbyterian Church in Ireland, the Non-subscribing Presbyterian Church of Ireland, the Free Presbyterian Church of Ulster, the Reformed Presbyterian Church of Ireland and the Evangelical Presbyterian Church.

==== France ====
There is a Church of Scotland (Presbyterian) in central Paris: The Scots Kirk, which is English-speaking, and is attended by many nationalities. It maintains close links with the Church of Scotland in Scotland itself, as well as with the Reformed Church of France.

==== Italy ====
The Waldensian Evangelical Church (Chiesa Evangelica Valdese, CEV) is an Italian Protestant denomination. The church was founded in the 12th century. After the Protestant Reformation, it adhered to Calvinist theology and became the Italian branch of the Presbyterian churches. As such, the church is a member of the World Communion of Reformed Churches.

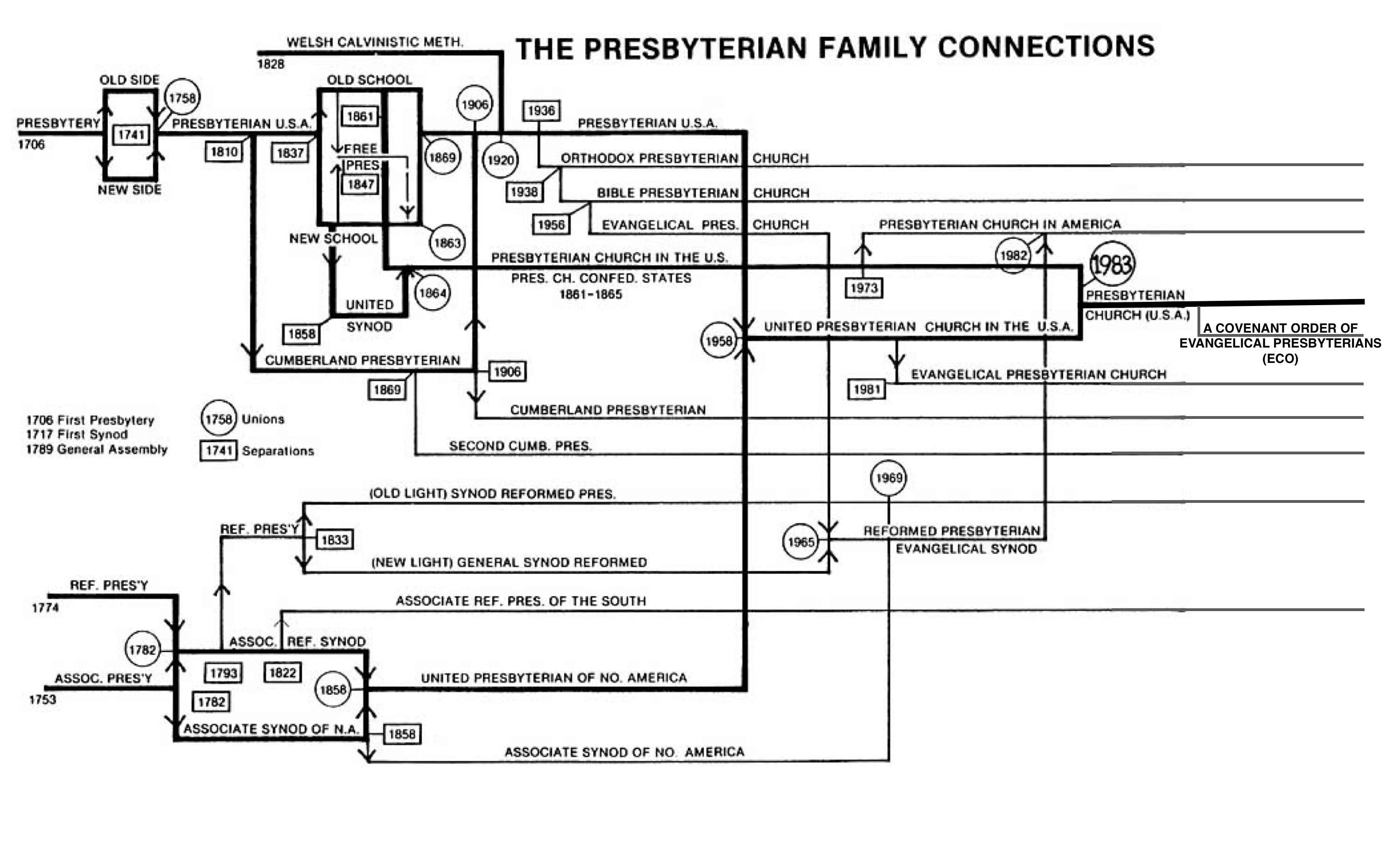
Evolution of Presbyterianism in the United States

=== North America ===
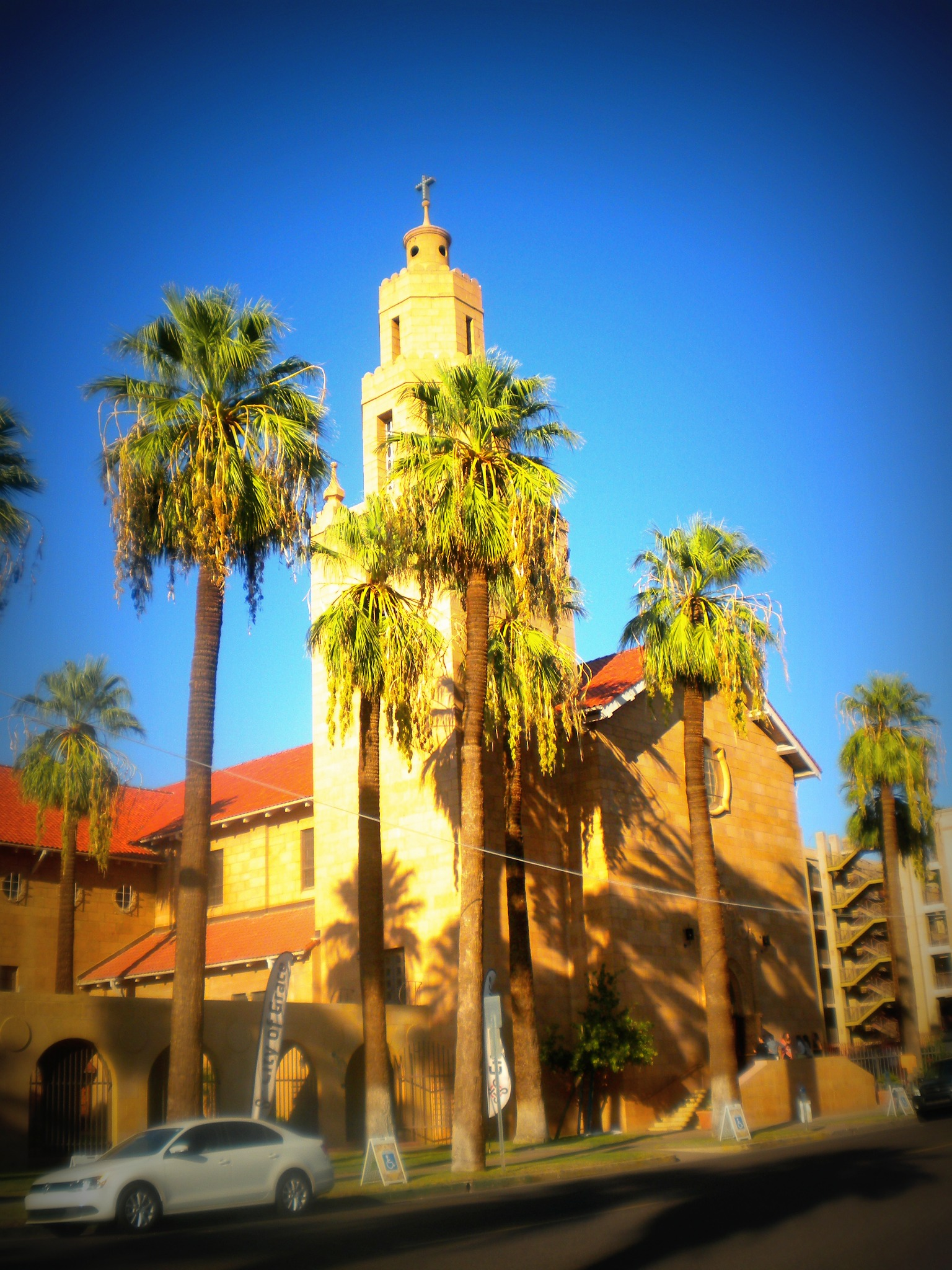
First Presbyterian Church in Phoenix, Arizona

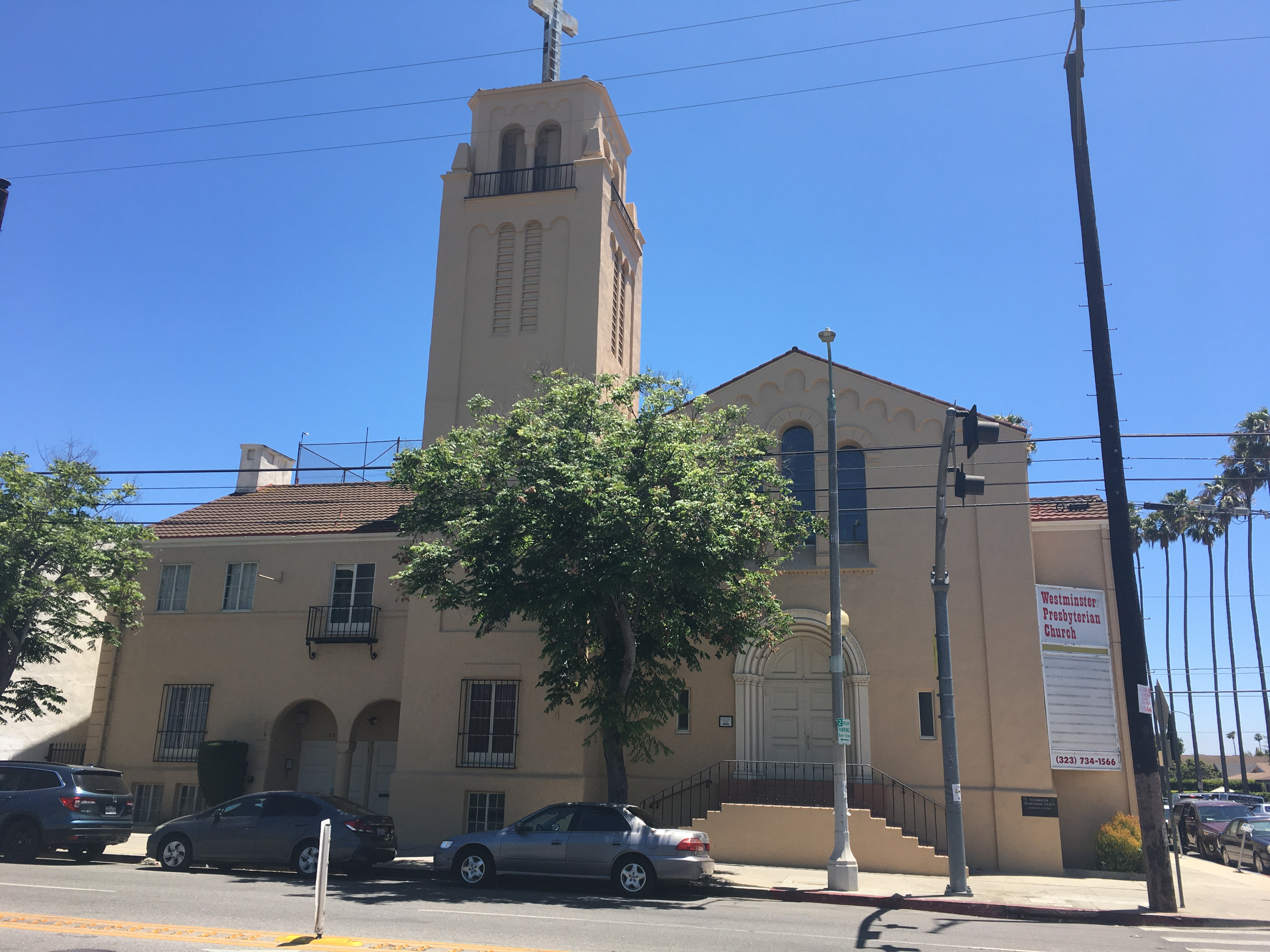
Westminster Presbyterian Church in Los Angeles

Even before Presbyterianism spread with immigrants abroad from Scotland, there were divisions in the larger Presbyterian family. Some later rejoined only to separate again. In what some interpret as rueful self-reproach, some Presbyterians refer to the divided Presbyterian churches as the "Split Ps".

==== United States ====
Presbyterianism first officially arrived in Colonial America in 1644 with the establishment of Christ's First Presbyterian Church in Heemstede/ Hempstead, Nieuw Amsterdam/ New York. The Church was organized by the Rev. Richard Denton.

In 1703 the first Presbytery in Philadelphia was established. In time, the presbytery would be joined by two more to form a synod (1717) and would evolve into the Presbyterian Church in the United States of America in 1789. The nation's largest Presbyterian denomination, the Presbyterian Church (U.S.A.) – PC (USA) – can trace its heritage to the original PCUSA, as can the Presbyterian Church in America (PCA), the Orthodox Presbyterian Church (OPC), the Bible Presbyterian Church (BPC), the Cumberland Presbyterian Church (CPC), the Cumberland Presbyterian Church in America, the Evangelical Presbyterian Church (EPC), and the Evangelical Covenant Order of Presbyterians (ECO).

Other Presbyterian bodies in the United States include the Reformed Presbyterian Church of North America (RPCNA), the Associate Reformed Presbyterian Church (ARP), the Reformed Presbyterian Church in the United States (RPCUS), the Reformed Presbyterian Church General Assembly, the Reformed Presbyterian Church – Hanover Presbytery, the Covenant Presbyterian Church, the Presbyterian Reformed Church, the Westminster Presbyterian Church in the United States, the Korean American Presbyterian Church, and the Free Presbyterian Church of North America.

The territory within about a 50-mile (80 km) radius of Charlotte, North Carolina, is historically the greatest concentration of Presbyterianism in the Southern United States, while an almost identical geographic area around Pittsburgh, Pennsylvania, contains probably the largest number of Presbyterians in the nation.

The PC (USA), beginning with its predecessor bodies, has, in common with other so-called "mainline" Protestant denominations, experienced a significant decline in members in recent years. Some estimates have placed that loss at nearly half in the last forty years.

Presbyterian influence, especially through Princeton theology, can be traced in modern Evangelicalism. Randall Balmer says that:

Evangelicalism itself, I believe, is a quintessentially North American phenomenon, deriving as it did from the confluence of Pietism, Presbyterianism, and the vestiges of Puritanism. Evangelicalism picked up the peculiar characteristics from each strain – warmhearted spirituality from the Pietists (for instance), doctrinal precisionism from the Presbyterians, and individualistic introspection from the Puritans – even as the North American context itself has profoundly shaped the various manifestations of evangelicalism: fundamentalism, neo-evangelicalism, the holiness movement, Pentecostalism, the charismatic movement, and various forms of African-American and Hispanic evangelicalism.

— Randall Balmer, The Encyclopedia of Evangelicalism (2002)

In the late 1800s, Presbyterian missionaries established a presence in what is now northern New Mexico. This provided an alternative to the Catholicism, which was brought to the area by the Spanish Conquistadors and had remained unchanged. The area experienced a "mini" reformation, in that many converts were made to Presbyterianism, prompting persecution. In some cases, the converts left towns and villages to establish their own neighboring villages. The arrival of the United States to the area prompted the Catholic church to modernize and make efforts at winning the converts back, many of which did return. However, there are still stalwart Presbyterians and Presbyterian churches in the area.

Lutherans, Episcopalians, and Presbyterians historically tend to be considerably wealthier and have been better educated (having more graduate and post-graduate degrees per capita) than most other religious groups in United States. They are disproportionately represented in the upper reaches of American business, law, and politics. They are part of a group known as White Anglo-Saxon Protestants (WASPs).

==== Canada ====
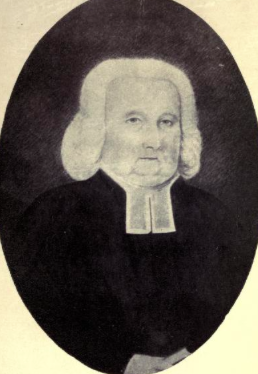
Reverend Bruin Romkes Comingo, 1st Presbyterian Minister in Canada, at St. Andrew's Presbyterian Church in Lunenburg

In Canada, the largest Presbyterian denomination – and the largest Protestant denomination – was the Presbyterian Church in Canada, formed in 1875 with the merger of four regional groups. In 1925, the United Church of Canada was formed by the majority of Presbyterians combining with the Methodist Church and the Congregational Union of Canada. A sizable minority of Canadian Presbyterians, primarily in southern Ontario but also throughout the nation, withdrew, and reconstituted themselves as a non-concurring continuing Presbyterian body. They regained use of the original name in 1939.

=== Latin America ===
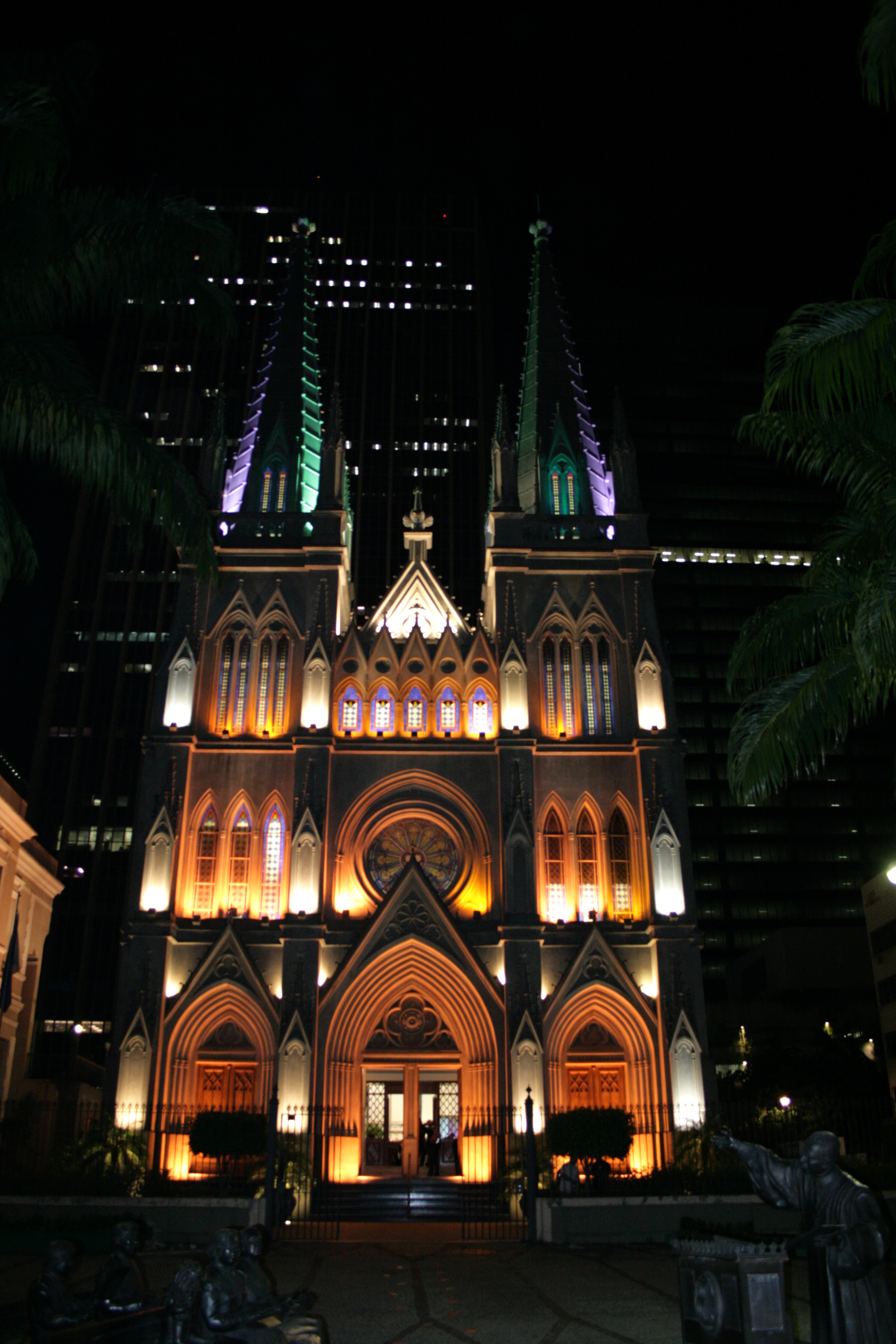
A Presbyterian cathedral in Rio de Janeiro, Brazil

Presbyterianism arrived in Latin America in the 19th century.

==== Mexico ====
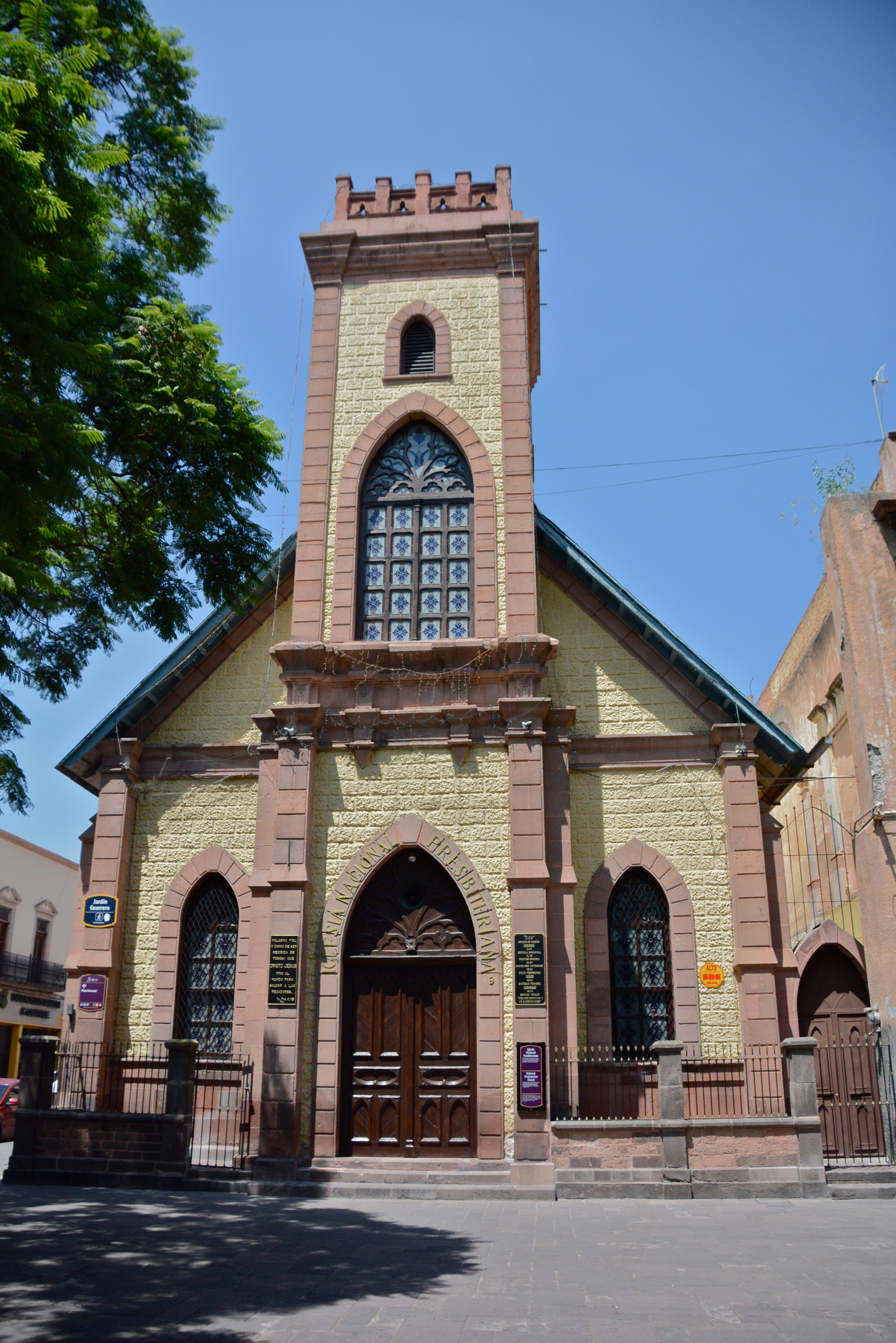
National Presbyterian Church in the historic center of San Luis Potosí, Mexico

The biggest Presbyterian church is the National Presbyterian Church in Mexico (Iglesia Nacional Presbiteriana de México), which has around 2,500,000 members and associates and 3000 congregations, but there are other small denominations like the Associate Reformed Presbyterian Church in Mexico which was founded in 1875 by the Associate Reformed Church in North America. The Independent Presbyterian Church, the Presbyterian Reformed Church in Mexico, and the National Conservative Presbyterian Church in Mexico are existing churches in the Reformed tradition.

==== Brazil ====
In Brazil, the Presbyterian Church of Brazil (Igreja Presbiteriana do Brasil) totals approximately 1,011,300 members; other Presbyterian churches (Independents, United, Conservatives, Renovated, etc.) in this nation have around 350,000 members. The Renewed Presbyterian Church in Brazil was influenced by the charismatic movement and has about 131 000 members as of 2011. The Conservative Presbyterian Church in Brazil was founded in 1940 and has eight presbyteries. The Fundamentalist Presbyterian church in Brazil was influenced by Carl McIntire and the US Bible Presbyterian Church and has around 1 800 members. The Independent Presbyterian Church of Brazil was founded in 1903 by Rev. Eduardo Carlos Pereira, has 500 congregations and 75 000 members. The United Presbyterian Church of Brazil has around 4 000 members. There are also ethnic Korean Presbyterian churches in the country. The Evangelical Reformed Churches in Brazil has Dutch origin. The Reformed Churches in Brazil were recently founded by the Canadian Reformed Churches with the Reformed Churches in the Netherlands (Liberated).

Congregational churches present in the country are also part of the Calvinistic tradition in Latin America.

==== Other Latin American states ====
There are probably more than four million members of Presbyterian churches in all of Latin America. Presbyterian churches are also present in Peru, Bolivia, Cuba, Trinidad and Tobago, Venezuela, Colombia, Chile, Paraguay, Costa Rica, Nicaragua, Argentina, Honduras and others, but with few members. The Presbyterian Church in Belize has 17 churches and church plants and there is a Reformed Seminary founded in 2004. Some Latin Americans in North America are active in the Presbyterian Cursillo Movement.

=== Africa ===
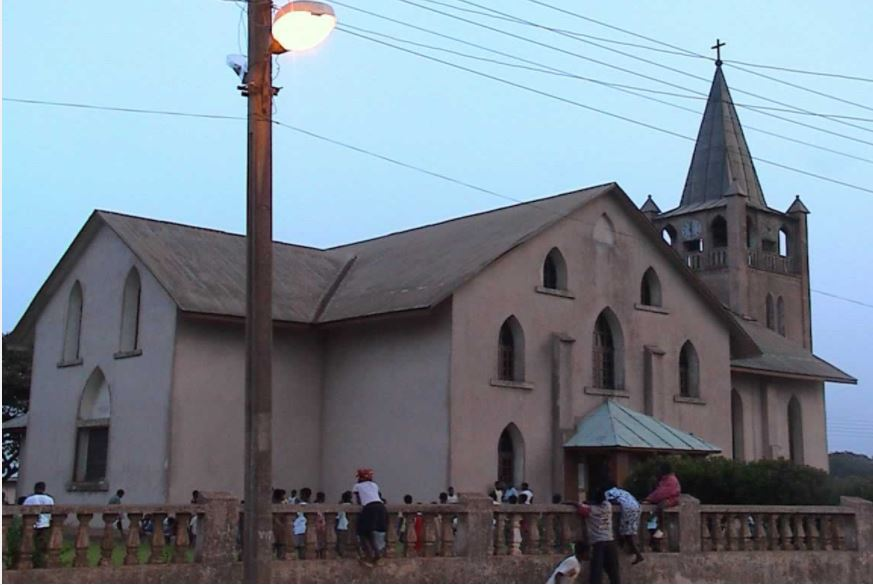
Christ Presbyterian Church in Akropong, Ghana

Presbyterianism arrived in Africa in the 19th century through the work of Scottish missionaries and founded churches such as St Michael and All Angels Church, Blantyre, Malawi. The church has grown extensively and now has a presence in at least 23 countries in the region.

African Presbyterian churches often incorporate diaconal ministries, including social services, emergency relief, and the operation of mission hospitals. A number of partnerships exist between presbyteries in Africa and the PC(USA), including specific connections with Lesotho, Cameroon, Malawi, South Africa, Ghana and Zambia. For example, the Lackawanna Presbytery, located in Northeastern Pennsylvania, has a partnership with a presbytery in Ghana. Also the Southminster Presbyterian Church, located near Pittsburgh, has partnerships with churches in Malawi and Kenya. The Presbyterian Church of Nigeria, western Africa is also active in mostly the southern states of this nation with strong density in the south-eastern states. Hope Waddel's missionary expedition in the mid 19th century, and later Mary Slessor's work in coastal regions of the then British colony has brought about the church in these areas.

Cameroon

The Presbyterian Church in Cameroon is a member of reformed churches in Cameroon.

==== Kenya ====
The Presbyterian Church of East Africa, based in Kenya, has 500 clergy and 4 million members.

==== Malawi ====
The Reformed Presbyterian Church in Malawi (RPCM) has 150 congregations and 17 000–20 000 members. It was a mission of the Free Presbyterian church of Scotland. The Restored Reformed Church works with RPCM. Evangelical Presbyterian Church in Malawi is an existing small church. Part of the Presbyterian Church in Malawi and Zambia is known as CCAP, Church of Central Africa-Presbyterian. Often the churches there have one main congregation and a number of prayer houses. Education, health ministries, and worship and spiritual development are important.

==== Southern Africa ====
The Bantu Presbyterian Church of South Africa was formed in 1923, following missionary work by the Free Church of Scotland with indigenous Africans at the Lovedale Mission. In 1992, it was renamed as the Reformed Presbyterian Church. In 1999, it united with the (historically European) Presbyterian Church in South Africa to form the Uniting Presbyterian Church in Southern Africa.

==== Northern Africa ====
- The Presbyterian Church of South Sudan and Sudan, founded in 1902 by American missionaries in Malakal, was deprived of foreign pastors since 1962 by decision of the Sudanese government but it continued to grow. It is now the 3rd largest Christian church in Sudan with 1,000,000 members, shared between Sudan and South Sudan.
- The Presbyterian Evangelical Church of Sudan was founded in the north of the country and in Khartoum by the same American missionaries in the late 19th century but left under the guidance of Egyptian evangelical pastors of Coptic origin.

In addition, there are a number of Presbyterian Churches in north Africa, the most known is the Nile Synod in Egypt and a recently founded synod for Sudan.

=== Asia ===
==== Hong Kong ====
The Hong Kong Council of the Church of Christ in China (CCC) is a uniting church formed by Presbyterians and Congregationalists, which inherited the Reformed tradition. HKCCCC is also the only mainline Reformed church in Hong Kong.

Cumberland Presbyterian Church Yao Dao Secondary School is a Presbyterian school in Yuen Long, New Territories. The Cumberland Presbyterian Church also have a church on the island of Cheung Chau. There are also Korean Christians resident in Hong Kong who are Presbyterians.

==== South Korea ====
Presbyterian Churches are the biggest and by far the most influential Protestant denominations in South Korea, with close to 20,000 churches affiliated with the two largest Presbyterian denominations in the country. In South Korea there are 9 million Presbyterians, forming the majority of the 15 million Korean Protestants. In South Korea there are 100 different Presbyterian denominations.

Most of the Korean Presbyterian denominations share the same name in Korean, 대한예수교장로회 (literally means the Presbyterian Church of Korea or PCK), tracing its roots to the United Presbyterian Assembly. A Presbyterian schism began with a Japanese shrine worship enforced during the Japanese colonial period and the establishment of a minor division (Koryu-pa, 고려파, later The Koshin Presbyterian Church in Korea, Koshin 고신) in 1952. In 1953 a second schism happened when the theological orientation of the Chosun Seminary (later Hanshin University) founded in 1947 could not be tolerated in the PCK and another minor group (The Presbyterian Church in the Republic of Korea, Kijang, 기장) was separated. The last major schism had to do with the issue of whether the PCK should join the WCC. The controversy divided the PCK into two denominations, The Presbyterian Church of Korea (Tonghap, 통합) and The General Assembly of Presbyterian Church in Korea (Hapdong, 합동) in 1959. All major seminaries associated with each denomination claim heritage from the Pyung Yang Theological Seminary.

Korean Presbyterian denominations are active in evangelism and many of its missionaries are being sent overseas, being the second biggest missionary sender in the world after the United States. GMS, the missionary body of the "Hapdong" General Assembly of Presbyterian Churches of Korea, is the single largest Presbyterian missionary organization in Korea. In addition there are many Korean-American Presbyterians in the United States, either with their own church sites or sharing space in pre-existing churches as is the case in Australia, New Zealand and even Muslim countries such as Saudi Arabia with Korean immigration.

The Korean Presbyterian Church started through the mission of the Presbyterian Church (USA) and the Australian Presbyterian theological tradition is central to the United States. But after independence, the 'Presbyterian Church in Korea (KoRyuPa)' advocated a Dutch Reformed position. In the 21st century, a new General Assembly of the Orthodox Presbyterian Church of Korea (Founder. Ha Seung-moo) in 2012 declared itself an authentic historical succession of Scottish Presbyterian John Knox.

==== Taiwan ====
The Presbyterian Church in Taiwan (PCT) is by far the largest Protestant denomination in Taiwan, with some 238,372 members as of 2009 (including a majority of the island's aborigines). English Presbyterian Missionary James Laidlaw Maxwell established the first Presbyterian church in Tainan in 1865. His colleague George Leslie Mackay, of the Canadian Presbyterian Mission, was active in Tamsui and north Taiwan from 1872 to 1901; he founded the island's first university and hospital, and created a written script for Taiwanese Minnan. The English and Canadian missions joined as the PCT in 1912. One of the few churches permitted to operate in Taiwan through the era of Japanese rule (1895–1945), the PCT experienced rapid growth during the era of Kuomintang-imposed martial law (1949–1987), in part due to its support for democracy, human rights, and Taiwan independence. Former ROC president Lee Teng-hui (in office 1988–2000) was a Presbyterian.

==== India ====
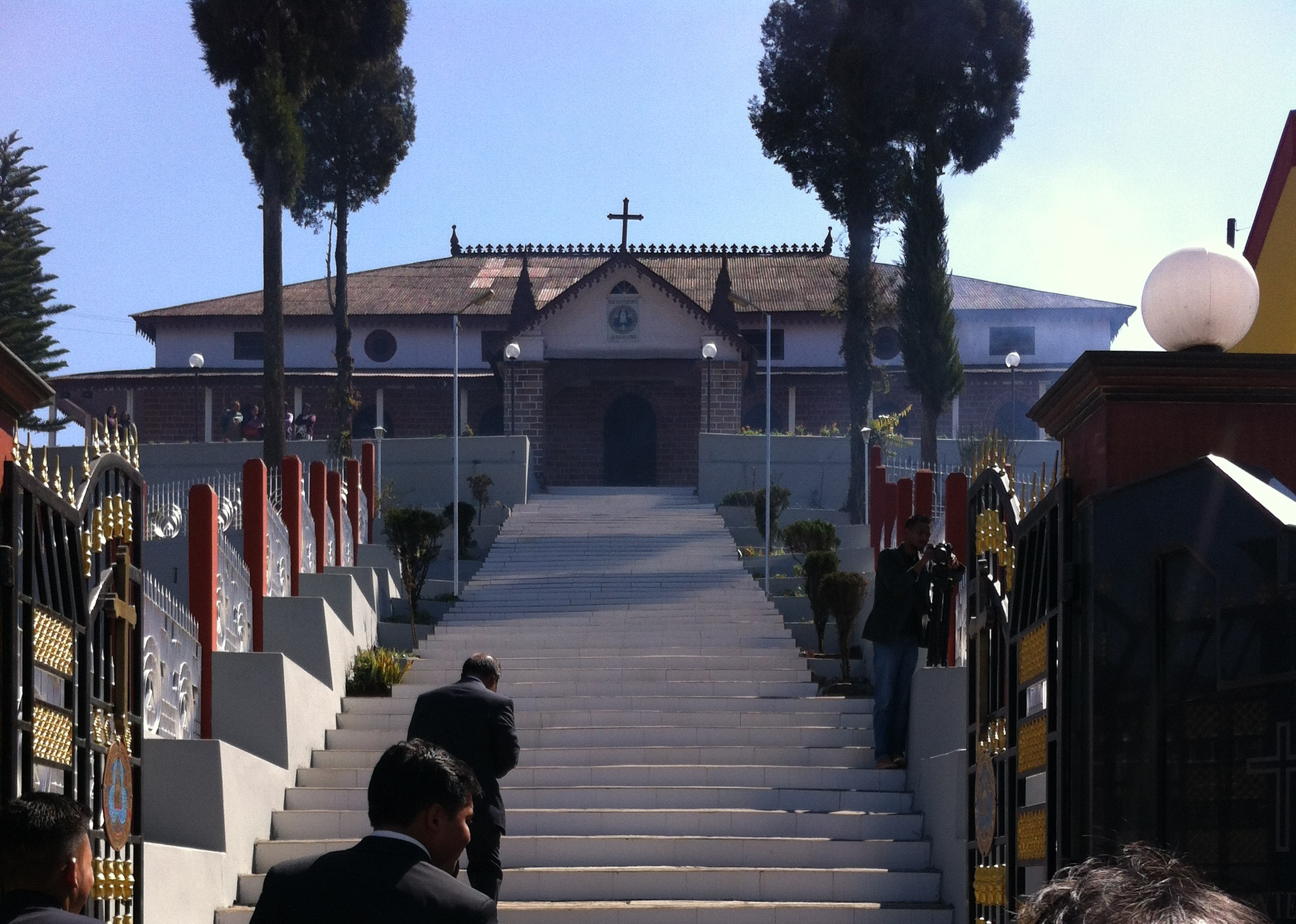
Jowai Presbyterian Church in India

In the mainly Christian Indian state of Mizoram, Presbyterianism is the largest of all Christian denominations. It was brought there by missionaries from Wales in 1897. Prior to Mizoram, Welsh Presbyterians started venturing into northeast India through the Khasi Hills (now in the state of Meghalaya in India) and established Presbyterian churches all over the Khasi Hills from the 1840s onwards. Hence, there is a strong presence of Presbyterians in Shillong (the present capital of Meghalaya) and the areas adjoining it. The Welsh missionaries built their first church in Sohra (aka Cherrapunji) in 1846. The Presbyterian church in India was integrated in 1970 into the United Church of Northern India (originally formed in 1924). It is the largest Presbyterian denomination in India.

=== Oceania ===
==== Australia ====
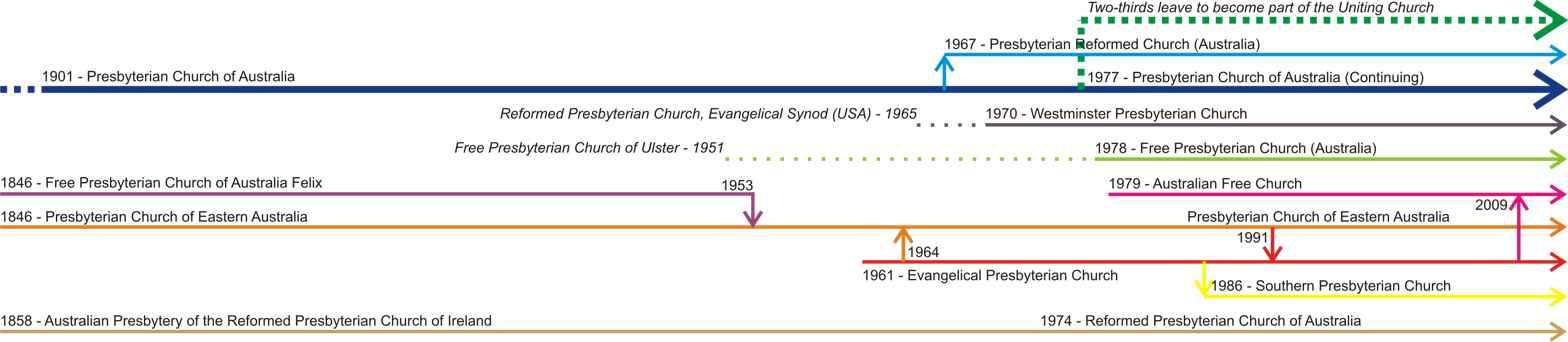
Timeline of the Presbyterian denominations in Australia over the past century, and the movement of congregations from one to another

In Australia, Presbyterianism is the fourth largest denomination of Christianity, with nearly 600,000 Australians claiming to be Presbyterian in the 2006 Commonwealth Census. Presbyterian churches were founded in each colony, some with links to the Church of Scotland and others to the Free Church. There were also congregations originating from United Presbyterian Church of Scotland as well as a number founded by John Dunmore Lang. Most of these bodies merged between 1859 and 1870, and in 1901 formed a federal union called the Presbyterian Church of Australia but retaining their state assemblies. The Presbyterian Church of Eastern Australia representing the Free Church of Scotland tradition, and congregations in Victoria of the Reformed Presbyterian Church, originally from Ireland, are the other existing denominations dating from colonial times.

In 1977, about 70% of the Presbyterian Church of Australia, along with most of the Congregational Union of Australia and all the Methodist Church of Australasia, combined to form the Uniting Church in Australia. The 30% that did not unite had various reasons for so acting, often cultural attachment but often conservative theological or social views. The permission for the ordination of women given in 1974 was rescinded in 1991. This did not affect the two or three existing woman ministers. The approval of women elders given in the 1960s has been rescinded in most states. The exception was New South Wales, which has the largest membership. The theology of the church is now generally conservative and Reformed. A number of small Presbyterian denominations have arisen since the 1950s through migration or schism.

==== New Zealand ====
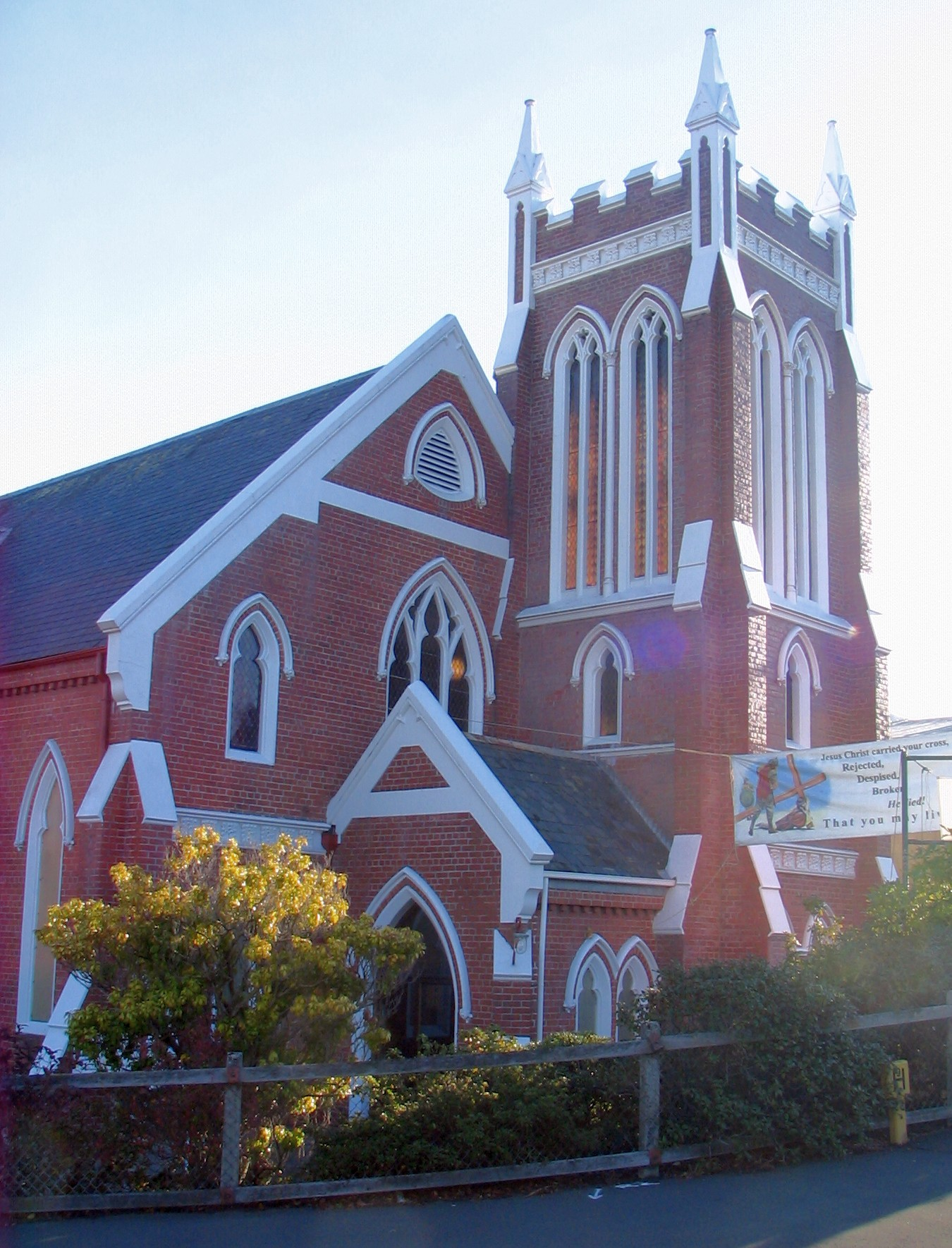
Kaikorai Presbyterian Church in New Zealand

In New Zealand, Presbyterian is the dominant denomination in Otago and Southland due largely to the rich Scottish and to a lesser extent Ulster-Scots heritage in the region. The area around Christchurch, Canterbury, is dominated philosophically by the Anglican denomination.

Originally there were two branches of Presbyterianism in New Zealand, the northern Presbyterian church which existed in the North Island and the parts of the South Island north of the Waitaki River, and the Synod of Otago and Southland, founded by Free Church settlers in southern South Island. The two churches merged in 1901, forming what is now the Presbyterian Church of Aotearoa New Zealand.

In addition to the Presbyterian Church of Aotearoa New Zealand, there is also a more conservative Presbyterian church called Grace Presbyterian Church of New Zealand. Many of its members left the largely liberal PCANZ because they were seeking a more conservative church. It has 17 churches throughout New Zealand.

==== Vanuatu ====
In Vanuatu, the Presbyterian Church in Vanuatu is the largest denomination in the country, with approximately one-third of the population of Vanuatu members of the church. The PCV was taken to Vanuatu by missionaries from Scotland. The PCV (Presbyterian Church in Vanuatu) is headed by a moderator with offices in Port Vila. The PCV is particularly strong in the provinces of Tafea, Shefa, and Malampa. The Province of Sanma is mainly Presbyterian with a strong Catholic minority in the Francophone areas of the province. There are some Presbyterian people, but no organised Presbyterian churches in Penama and Torba, both of which are traditionally Anglican. Vanuatu is the only country in the South Pacific with a significant Presbyterian heritage and membership. The PCV is a founding member of yjr Vanuatu Christian Council (VCC). The PCV runs many primary schools and Onesua secondary school. The church is strong in the rural villages.

== See also ==
- Samuel Davies — Foremost Presbyterian colonial preacher during the Great Awakening of the 18th century
- Celtic cross
- English Presbyterianism
- Fundamentalist–Modernist Controversy
- Ghost Ranch
- Puritan's Pit
- Presbyterian confessions of faith
- Religion in Scotland

=== Churches ===
- List of Presbyterian churches
- St Giles' Cathedral in Edinburgh
