= National Conservative Presbyterian Church in Mexico =

Christian denomination

- Classification: Protestant
- Theology: Orthodox Reformed
- Governance: Presbyterian
- Region: Mexico
- Founder: Eleazar Z. Perez
- Origin: 1954; Mexico City
- Congregations: 64
- Members: unknown

The National Conservative Presbyterian Church in Mexico (Spanish: Iglesia Nacional Presbiteriana Conservadora de Mexico) is a Christian denomination in Mexico.

== Origin ==
It was founded in 1954 when a conflict within the National Presbyterian Church in Mexico led the formation of this denomination. It was established by Eleazar Z. Perez, pastor of El Divido Parish.

The National Presbytery of Mexico City worked independently from the National Presbyterian Church in Mexico from 1954. It adopted the name National Conservative Presbyterian Church in Mexico. This denomination consisted of one solely presbytery until October 16, 1996, when 2 presbyteries was organised and the first General Assembly was held. The National Conservative Presbyterian Church in Mexico differ from the National Presbyterian Church in Mexico for his stance of the preservation of pure doctrine, not included modernism, ecumenism, charismatism. In 2004 there were 1,600 members in the denomination, and 20 ordained clergy.

== Theology ==
- Apostles Creed
- Nicene Creed
- Westminster Confession of Faith
- Westminster Shorter Catechism
- Westminster Larger Catechism

== Statistics ==
The church currently has 63 congregations and 3 presbyteries, these are the Mexico City presbytery, the Eastern Mexico National Presbytery and the Western National Presbytery.
