= Independent Presbyterian Church in Mexico =

The Independent Presbyterian Church in Mexico was founded in 1984, due to tension between Mexican leaders and the Christian Reformed Church in North America missionaries. The majority decided to cooperate with the American missionaries, but 3 out of the 5 Presbyteries opted for independence. The Mexican government registered the Independent Presbyterian Church and also obtained the control of properties.

In 2004 it had 2,500 members and 35 congregations and 30 house fellowships and has Presbyteries and a General Assembly. The church affirms the Apostles Creed, Athanasian Creed, Nicene Creed, Belgic Confession, Heidelberg Catechism and the Westminster Confession of Faith, the Westminster Larger Catechism.
