= Protestant views on contraception =

Religious views on birth control

Protestant views on contraception are markedly more pluralistic than the doctrine expressed by the Magisterium of the Catholic Church, due to historical divergences of theological thought that began during the Protestant Reformation, including the rejection of an infallible doctrinal authority other than Scripture. The doctrine of various forms of Protestantism as a whole from the Reformation until 1930 strongly condemned contraception as the Catholic Church does, but such opposition has since almost totally been dropped. Since the 1930 Seventh Lambeth Conference of the Anglican Communion, major mainline Protestant denominations shifted their doctrine to accepting contraception. In general, most liberal Protestants, such as the United Church of Christ, hold relatively settled views that accept the use of contraception, while conservative evangelicals denominations mostly also accept the use of contraception; however, some evangelicals are divided on the issue, with a small minority of denominations seeing natural family planning as the only permissible method. Other traditions such as Laestadian Lutheran Churches, do not permit the use of birth control and may teach Quiverfull doctrine, which holds that Christians should have large families.

== Denominational positions ==
=== Anglicanism ===
The Church of England has stated in the 1958 Lambeth Conference that the responsibility for deciding upon the number and frequency of children was laid by God upon the consciences of parents 'in such ways as are acceptable to husband and wife'.

=== Lutheranism ===
The Evangelical Lutheran Church in America allows for contraception in the event the potential parents do not intend to care for a child. Other Lutheran churches or synods take other positions, or do not take any position at all. For example, in 1990 the Lutheran Churches of the Reformation passed a resolution titled "Procreation" stating that birth control, in all forms, is sin, although they "allow for exegetical differences and exceptional cases (casuistry)", for example, when the woman's life is at risk. Laestadian Lutheran Churches do not permit the use of birth control. Neither the Lutheran Church–Missouri Synod (LCMS) nor the Wisconsin Evangelical Lutheran Synod (WELS) have an official position on contraception. Christian News, a weekly paper edited by a pastor of an LCMS congregation, opposes contraception.

=== Methodism ===
The United Methodist Church, holds that "each couple has the right and the duty prayerfully and responsibly to control conception according to their circumstances." Its Resolution on Responsible Parenthood states that in order to "support the sacred dimensions of personhood, all possible efforts should be made by parents and the community to ensure that each child enters the world with a healthy body, and is born into an environment conducive to realization of his or her potential." To this end, the United Methodist Church supports "adequate public funding and increased participation in family planning services by public and private agencies."

The Methodist Church of Great Britain also supports responsible use of birth control, welcoming its use as a means "towards fulfilment in marriage, the spacing of children, and the need to avoid pregnancy altogether, for example for medical reasons."

=== Reformed Christianity (Continental Reformed, Presbyterian, and Congregationalist) ===
The Presbyterian Church (USA) supports “full and equal access to contraceptive methods.” In a recent resolution endorsing insurance coverage for contraceptives, the church affirmed that “contraceptive services are part of basic health care” and cautioned that “unintended pregnancies lead to higher rates of infant mortality, low birth weight, and maternal morbidity, and threaten the economic viability of families.”

The United Church of Christ (UCC), a Reformed denomination of the Congregationalist tradition, promotes the distribution of condoms in churches and faith-based educational settings. Michael Shuenemeyer, a UCC minister, has stated that “The practice of safer sex is a matter of life and death. People of faith make condoms available because we have chosen life so that we and our children may live.”

=== Anabaptist Churches ===
==== Mennonites ====
Certain Conservative Mennonites, as with certain Beachy Amish Mennonite fellowships, maintain a prohibition against the use of birth control, though natural family planning is permitted. Old Colony Mennonites, as with the Old Order Amish, do not officially allow birth control practices.

Mainline Mennonite denominations, such as the Mennonite Church USA, the General Conference Mennonite Church, and the Rosedale Network of Churches, have adopted statements indicating the approval of modern methods of contraception. For example, while also teaching and encouraging love and acceptance of children, the Conservative Mennonite Conference maintains, "The prevention of pregnancy when feasible by birth control with pre-fertilization methods is acceptable." A study published in 1975 found that only 11% of Mennonites believed use of birth control was "always wrong".

==== Amish ====
All types of birth control, and also all forms of natural family planning such as calendar-based methods, are forbidden in Old-Order Amish communities. However, especially in recent years, more Amish women have begun using contraception. This trend is more pronounced in communities where few of the men earn their living through farming.

==== Hutterites ====
The Hutterite Brethren use contraception only if it is recommended by a physician.

=== Irvingism ===
The New Apostolic Church, the largest of the Irvingian Churches, teaches:

Family planning is at the discretion of both partners. Nevertheless, the Church opposes contraceptive methods and means that prevent the continued development of an already fertilised human egg cell. Artificial insemination is generally accepted, however, all measures by which life may be destroyed by human selection are rejected.

== History ==
Before the Protestant Reformation, the Roman Catholic Church viewed procreation as the primary purpose of sexual intercourse and unity of spouses. As part of the Reformation, Reformers began to more strongly emphasize the unitive pleasures of marriage. Still, all major early Protestant Reformers, and indeed Protestants in general until the twentieth century, condemned birth control as a contravention of God's procreative purpose for marriage.

As scientists advanced birth control methods during the late 19th and early 20th centuries, some Protestants continued to reject them, while other Nonconformists welcomed these advances. (Moncure Conway preached on the subject at South Place Chapel in London.) As an example of the dissent, the editor of a Nonconformist weekly journal in the United States wrote in 1893:

There was a time when any idea of voluntary limitation was regarded by pious people as interfering with Providence. We are beyond that now and have become capable of recognizing that Providence works through the commonsense of individual brains. We limit population just as much by deferring marriage for prudential reasons as by any action that may be taken after it.

Non-Catholic denominations were slow to officially go along with such a view, although followers were not as reluctant.

=== 1930 Seventh Lambeth Conference shift ===
Then in 1930, at the Seventh Lambeth Conference, the Anglican Communion, after years of considerable internal debate, issued the first statement permitting birth control "when there is a clearly felt moral obligation to limit or avoid parenthood and where there is a morally sound reason for avoiding complete abstinence."

Allan Carlson recounts how this affected the other Protestants:

There was an immediate American Protestant echo. In 1931, the Committee on Home and Marriage of the Federal Council of Churches (an ecumenical body that embraced Methodist, Presbyterian, Congregational, and Church of the Brethren denominations) issued a statement defending family limitation and urging the repeal of laws prohibiting contraceptive education and sales...In the late 1940s, a leading LCMS [Lutheran Church-Missouri Synod ] professor of theology, Alfred Rehwinckel, said that Luther had simply been wrong: the Genesis phrase, “Be fruitful and multiply,” was merely a blessing, not a command. Such views spread at a still more rapid pace among the Protestant “mainline” churches. Held near the end of the post World War II “baby boom,” when American family life for a brief period again seemed somewhat healthy, the 1961 North American Conference on Church and Family of the National Council of Churches (successor to the FCC) can only be called extraordinary....Not a single speaker spoke in the spirit of the old Protestant pronatalist ethic. Indeed, this ethic now stood as the chief enemy. The conference endorsed development of a new evangelical sexual ethic, one “relevant to our culture,” sensitive to the overpopulation crisis, and grounded in modern science. Member denominations soon complied. In a 1970 Report, the Presbyterian Church (U.S.A.) rejected the old “taboos and prohibitions” and gave its blessing to “mass contraceptive techniques,” homosexuality, and low-cost abortion on demand. The same year, the Lutheran Church in America fully embraced contraception and abortion as responsible choices. And in 1977, the United Church of Christ celebrated the terms “freedom,” “sensuousness,” and “androgyny,” and declared free access to contraception and abortion as matters of justice.

By 2005 acceptance had increased such that a Harris Interactive poll conducted online among 2,242 U.S. adults found that 88% of non-Catholic Christians who identified as either "very religious" or Evangelical supported the use of birth control/contraceptives.

=== Protestants Reformers’ views vs. modern Protestant views ===
Highly conservative Protestants such as Mary Pride, Charles D. Provan, Hess and Hess, and Rachel Scott, argue that Protestants should not have moved away from traditional Protestant views of contraception such as given by Martin Luther and John Calvin. Such modern authors contrast the views of early Reformers who rejected contraception with modern Christians who accept it, and point to primarily feminist, secular, or Satanic influences as causative to the change.

Provan in his The Bible and Birth Control extensively quotes early Protestant views of birth control, which Provan uses to conclude:

If Martin Luther were alive today, would he not disapprove of many Christians who view children as a bad thing, and so practice birth control to prevent God from sending more blessings to them? ... Truly Scriptural principles do not change at all: therefore Christians should willingly receive the blessings which God has for us, and not try to prevent them.

Reformed scholars such as James B. Jordan, however, maintain that Provan's view has the effect of adding a law to the Bible it does not contain. Jordan states:

Jesus repeatedly denounced the Pharisees for their additions to the Law of God. Thus, we must be extremely careful about what laws we lay down for people. Does the Bible clearly state that contraception is sinful, or that people are obligated to have as many children as possible? If the Bible does not say these things, we need to fear God and be frightened of adding to His Word.

Jordan argues also that the views of early Protestant Reformers on contraception are unreliable because they were heavily influenced by not just the Bible but Neo-Platonic mysticism (otherworldliness) and Aristolean teleologism (measuring all things only by their result), philosophies they inherited from their Catholic predecessors such as Thomas Aquinas and Augustine of Hippo. Bart Garrett describes it, "They operated in a time and context that unhealthily looked at sex as a base, physical pleasure that carried with it spiritual detriments."

Jordan further points to the Reformers' unreliability based upon their rejection of Song of Solomon as a description of passionate sexual expression within marriage. He also cites technophobia among Protestants, as evident by their rejection of things ranging from buttons to airplanes ("if God meant for man to fly he would have given him wings"). As well, Jordan points to what he describes as the Reformers' own mantra, "reformed and always reforming" (ecclesia reformata est semper reformanda), as evidence that Protestants should not crystallize their position on the matter at some point in the past, and says that rejecting contraceptives based upon their correlative rise alongside feminism exhibits the genetic fallacy.

== Ongoing issues ==
There are numerous ongoing debates at core of Protestant differences concerning contraceptives. These include whether contraceptive use or non-use is a matter of individual conscience or binding Biblical commands, what types of birth control are permissible if any, and the amount of weight modern Protestants should give early Protestant Reformers' views on contraception.

=== Individual conscience or commandment? ===
The majority of Protestants, irrespective of denomination, maintain that use or non-use of birth control in its various methods is a matter of conscience for individual Christians before God, and that individual couples should be convinced in their own minds of what is and is not permissible for them particularly (see Romans 14). In this view, God has a personal relationship with individual Christians and, because he has given no explicit Biblical commandment against birth control and uses and has even caused and overseen modern technological advancements (see Daniel 12:4), he guides particular couples' birth control practices in accordance with his particular will for their lives. Conservative evangelical leader John F. MacArthur states the view:

Nothing in Scripture prohibits married couples from practicing birth control, either for a limited time to delay childbearing, or permanently when they have borne children and determine that their family is complete ... In our viewpoint, birth control is biblically permissible. At the same time, couples should not practice birth control if it violates their consciences (Romans 14:23)—not because birth control is inherently sinful, but because it is always wrong to violate the conscience. The answer to a wrongly informed conscience is not to violate it, but rather to correct and rightly inform one's conscience with biblical truth.

R. Albert Mohler, Jr., the ninth president of the Southern Baptist Theological Seminary in Louisville, Kentucky states:

Evangelical couples may, at times, choose to use contraceptives in order to plan their families and enjoy the pleasures of the marital bed. The couple must consider all these issues with care, and must be truly open to the gift of children. The moral justification for using contraceptives must be clear in the couple's mind, and fully consistent with the couple's Christian commitments.

Additional adherents of this view include Rainey, James Dobson, Jordan, Mohler, and evangelical ethicists Franklin E. Payne and John and Paul Feinberg. Although most Protestants adhere to this view, some such as Rainey may nonetheless advocate for one of the categories he describes, depending upon which Christian values they deem most important.

Some Protestants, however, reject the position that contraceptive use is a matter of conscience. Although some Quiverfull adherents accept that birth control use is a matter of individual conscience, other such adherents may argue that the Bible commands their position for all Christians. For example, David Crank, publisher of Unless The Lord Magazine, states, "The 'Quiverfull' approach is universal in the sense that it is not something unusual that only a few are called to. Rather it is God's basic design and plan for mankind, and it was the way most of mankind lived most of the time, until the 20th century." Charles D. Provan additionally argues:

"Be fruitful and multiply" ... is a command of God, indeed the first command to a married couple. Birth control obviously involves disobedience to this command, for birth control attempts to prevent being fruitful and multiplying. Therefore birth control is wrong, because it involves disobedience to the Word of God. Nowhere is this command done away with in the entire Bible; therefore it still remains valid for us today.

Quiverfull authors such as Hess and Hess disagree and say the matter is simply one of clear obedience or disobedience to God's words in the Bible:

"Behold, children are a gift of the Lord" (Psa. 127:3). Do we really believe that? If children are a gift from God, let’s for the sake of argument ask ourselves what other gift or blessing from God we would reject. Money? Would we reject great wealth if God gave it? Not likely! How about good health? Many would say that a man’s health is his most treasured possession. But children? Even children given by God? "That’s different!" some will plead! All right, is it different? God states right here in no-nonsense language that children are gifts. Do we believe His Word to be true?

To such statements, Protestants such as Jordan point out that Christians will, in fact, choose against the blessing of money and great wealth. Jordan also maintains that, while children are indeed blessings, they are only one among a wide range of blessings God offers, and prayerfully choosing foci among them is part of prudent Christian stewardship. John Piper's Desiring God ministry further explains:

Scriptures also say that a wife is a gift from the Lord (Proverbs 18:22), but that doesn't mean that it is wrong to stay single (1 Corinthians 7:8). Just because something is a gift from the Lord does not mean that it is wrong to be a steward of when or whether you will come into possession of it. It is wrong to reason that since A is good and a gift from the Lord, then we must pursue as much of A as possible. God has made this a world in which tradeoffs have to be made and we cannot do everything to the fullest extent. For kingdom purposes, it might be wise not to get married. And for kingdom purposes, it might be wise to regulate the size of one's family and to regulate when the new additions to the family will likely arrive. As Wayne Grudem has said, "it is okay to place less emphasis on some good activities in order to focus on other good activities."

==== “Be fruitful and multiply”—command or blessing? ====
Protestants, including Quiverfull adherents, also disagree over whether the Biblical statement "be fruitful and multiply" in Genesis 1:28 and 9:7 is a command or simply a blessing God spoke over its recipients. Mary Pride and Charles D. Provan see it as a binding command upon married Christians, while Dobson, MacArthur, Jordan, and Raymond C. Van Leeuwen do not see the statement as prohibiting family planning by contraceptive use.

==== The Sin of Onan—condemnation of contraceptive use? ====
As part of this debate, Protestants (as well as some Catholics) disagree over the Sin of Onan as found in the Bible verses of Genesis 38:1-10. Protestants within the "children in abundance" group (see discussion of below) often see Onan's act of coitus interruptus as condemning contraceptive use, while most see Onan's real sin as ongoing rebellion against God, with his failure to fulfill the terms of his Levirate marriage (Yibbum) being his final rebellious act.

=== Which methods are permissible? ===
Also see: Natural Family Planning, Barrier contraception and Hormonal contraception

Protestants who accept that birth control is permissible may disagree over which methods are impermissible.

==== Natural Family Planning only or "artificial" methods too? ====
In Sam and Bethany Torode's 2002 book, Open Embrace: A Protestant Couple Rethinks Contraception, the young couple argued that only Natural Family Planning was permissible, citing their views borrowed from Catholicism including the Theology of the Body. The couple later accepted barrier methods and stated:

Strict NFP reaches a point where it is more harmful for a marriage than good. We think that Jesus' words in Luke 11:46 apply: "And you experts in the law, woe to you, because you load people down with burdens they can hardly carry." How is it that spouses are saying "yes" to the gift of each other when they end up abstaining for much of their married lives? ... We also see honest congruity with the language of the body by saying "no" to conception with our bodies (via barrier methods or sensual massage) when our minds and hearts are also saying "no" to conception. We don’t believe this angers God, nor that it leads to the slippery slope of relativism or divorce. We strongly disagree with the idea that this is a mortal sin.

John Piper's Desiring God ministry states of NFP:

Some conclude that "natural family planning" is acceptable but "artificial" means are not. But this seems to overlook something significant: in both cases, you are still seeking to regulate when you have children. And so if one concludes that it is wrong to seek to regulate the timing and size of a family, then it would have to be concluded that natural family planning is just as wrong as "artificial" means. But if one concludes that it is appropriate to steward the timing and size of one's family, then what makes "artificial" means wrong but natural family planning right? Surely it is not because God is "more free" to overrule our plans with natural family planning! Perhaps some have concluded that artificial forms are wrong because they allow one more fully to separate intercourse from the possibility of procreation. But if it is wrong to have intercourse without a significant possibility of procreation, then it would also be wrong to have intercourse during pregnancy or after a woman is past her childbearing years. There is no reason to conclude that natural family planning is appropriate but that "artificial" means are not.

In her book, Birth Control for Christians: Making Wise Choices, Jenell Williams Paris, who is associate professor of anthropology at Bethel College in St. Paul, reviews the benefits and uncertainties of various birth control methods, and decidedly favors the Fertility Awareness Method (FAM), which is similar to NFP but is different. (Paris is a FAM instructor.) The main difference is that FAM is not tied to Roman Catholic teaching. Regarding hormonal methods and abortion, Paris explains that both assertions that the hormonal methods are necessarily acting as abortifacients and the counter claim that they never do are impossible to substantiate from data, and that the probability of the hypothesized scenarios are so small such that the collection of data seems infeasible.

==== Hormonal contraceptives ====
Based upon a view that life begins at conception, Protestant author Randy Alcorn rejects all forms of hormonal contraceptives, while James Dobson and obstetrician and minister William R. Cutrer reject only certain forms of them. Dobson and Cutrer view progesterone-only birth control pills as potentially problematic, since they may be potentially abortive contraceptives because of the theoretical possibility that they may have a slight secondary action of preventing a fertilized embryo from implanting within the uterine wall, while Alcorn implicates all hormonal contraceptives as problematic in these regards. Dobson's Focus on the Family states:

Dr. Dobson would emphasize as foundational his strict concurrence with the biblical teaching that every child is a blessing from God ... While affirming that human life begins with fertilization (the union of sperm and egg), his interpretation of Scripture leads him to believe that the prevention of fertilization is not morally wrong. However, he would oppose any method of birth control that acts after fertilization and terminates a conceived human life by preventing its implantation in the womb ... After two years of extended deliberation and prayer, the PRC has not been able to reach a consensus as to the likelihood, or even the possibility, that these medications might contribute to the loss of human life after fertilization. The majority of the experts to which Dr. Dobson has spoken feel that the pill does not have an abortifacient effect. A minority of the experts feel that when conception occurs on the pill, there is enough of a possibility for an abortifacient effect [with the progesterine-only pill], however remote, to warrant informing women about it.

The American Association of Pro-Life Obstetricians & Gynecologists, however, argues that it is inappropriate to implicate certain hormonal contraceptives as abortifacient based upon theory only, and points out that no empirical evidence exists to prove any abortifacient action. The organization states:

Is it appropriate to implicate a medication as an abortive agent without the data to support such a claim? To do so creates needless hostility and division among physicians and patients who genuinely respect life from the moment of conception. Where do we draw the line in informed consent for responsible disclosure of known medical risks vs. a theoretical risk which is not substantiated by current scientific knowledge? Is it accurate to implicate all hormonal contraceptive methods as one regarding their method of action, rather than evaluating each one individually?

== Current views ==
Author and FamilyLife Today radio host Dennis Rainey suggests four categories as useful in understanding current Protestant views concerning birth control. Christopher G. Ellison and Patricia Goodson use very similar categories in their 1997 study of Protestant seminarians' attitudes on the matter.

=== "Children in abundance" group ===
The first is the "children in abundance" group. Protestants within this group believe that birth control is a contravention of God's purpose for marriage and that all children conceived during routine sexual intercourse (without regard to time of the month during the ovulation cycle or other matters) should be welcomed as blessings. The Quiverfull movement and its authors such as Mary Pride, Rick and Jan Hess, Charles D. Provan, Nancy Leigh DeMoss, Rachel Giove Scott, and others, predominate this group. Based upon Bible verses that describe God acting to "open and close the womb" (see Genesis 20:18, 29:31, 30:22; 1 Samuel 1:5-6; Isaiah 66:9), Quiverfull adherents believe that Divine Providence alone should control how many and how often children are conceived and born.

Protestants in this group often connect birth control use with modern feminism, an "anti-child mentality", "worldliness", and abortion because birth control is used for "the same reasons why a woman aborts her child".

=== "Children in managed abundance" group ===
The second is the "children in managed abundance" group. According to Rainey, Protestants within this group are open to however many children they may conceive during their fertile years yet believe that only Natural Family Planning is acceptable and may use it. A young couple Sam and Bethany Torode advocated for this view in their 2002 book, although they later accepted barrier contraception such as diaphragms and condoms. Denny Kenaston of Charity Christian Fellowship also advocates for this position, as does Presbyterian seminary professor Daniel Doriani.

=== "Children in moderation" group ===
The third is the "children in moderation" group. In Rainey's view, these Protestants are very pro-child but feel free to use artificial birth control to prudently plan their families. Those within this group see Divine Providence and Biblically required responsibility acting via man's free will as working complementarily. They thus may feel freedom to use non-"natural" birth control in making personal choices in consultation with God about the number and spacing of children.

=== "No children" group ===
The fourth group is the "no children" group. Rainey sees couples in this group as believing they are within their Biblical rights to define their lives around non-natal concerns. While not their main emphasis on the subject, Protestant authors such as Samuel Owen and James B. Jordan support this as an acceptable option, but only when a higher ethical principle intervenes to make child bearing imprudent in comparison, such as health concerns or a calling to serve orphans or as missionaries in a dangerous location, etc. A small activist group, the Cyber-Church of Jesus Christ Childfree, argues their position, "Jesus loved children but chose to never have any, so that he could devote his life to telling the Good News." Jordan also maintains that modern birth control methods, as well as Natural Family Planning, are acceptable tools of prudent family planning. Jordan also strongly supports the option for couples to have very large families, while Owen believes that non-use of birth control in any form should be normative. Rainey sees infertile couples as falling into this group apart from their choice in the matter. Sterilized couples may as well. According to Southern Baptist R. Albert Mohler, Jr., "Couples are not given the option of chosen childlessness in the biblical revelation".

=== Sterilization reversals ===
Stemming from ideas from the Quiverfull movement, some Protestants such as Bill Gothard advocate for couples to undergo sterilization reversal surgery, while Brad and Dawn Irons of Blessed Arrows Sterilization Reversal Ministry advocate for Quiverfull ideas while providing funding, physician referrals, and support to Protestants wishing to undergo reversal surgery.

== See also ==
- Religion and HIV/AIDS
