= Reformed Presbyterian Church =

Reformed Presbyterian may refer to the following Presbyterian churches:

- A mutually recognising set of churches listed at Reformed Presbyterian churches, including:
  - The Reformed Presbyterian Church of Australia
  - The Reformed Presbyterian Church of North America (which includes a presbytery in Japan)
  - The Reformed Presbyterian Church of Ireland
  - The Reformed Presbyterian Church of Scotland
- Any of the following North American churches:
  - The Reformed Presbyterian Church, Evangelical Synod (split from Reformed Presbyterian Church of North America in 1833, joined Presbyterian Church in America in 1982)
  - The Reformed Presbyterian Church in the United States (began in 1983, arising from the Christian Reconstruction movement)
  - The Reformed Presbyterian Church General Assembly (1991-)
  - The Reformed Presbyterian Church – Hanover Presbytery (1991-)
  - The Associate Reformed Presbyterian Church (1803 -)
- Various Presbyterian Reformed churches, including:
  - Presbyterian Reformed Church (Australia)
