= Biblical patriarchy =

Set of beliefs in evangelical Christianity concerning gender relations

Biblical patriarchy, also known as Christian patriarchy, is a set of beliefs in Evangelical Protestant Christianity concerning gender relations and their manifestations in institutions, including marriage, the family, and the home. It sees the father as the head of the home, responsible for the conduct of his family. Biblical patriarchy was popularized in the 1990s and early 2000s by Douglas Phillips, founder of Vision Forum Ministries, while its best-known current spokesman is Douglas Wilson. Other people associated with biblical patriarchy include R. C. Sproul, Jr., Voddie Baucham (who preferred the phrase "gospel patriarchy"), the Duggar family, Dale Partridge, and Benjamin Szumskyj.

== Beliefs ==
The "Tenets of Biblical Patriarchy" published by Vision Forum before their demise advocates such beliefs as:

- God reveals himself as masculine, not feminine.
- God ordained distinct gender roles for man and woman as part of the created order.
- A husband and father is the head of his household, a family leader, provider, and protector.
- Male leadership in the home carries over into the church: only men are permitted to hold ruling positions in the church. A God-honoring society will likewise prefer male leadership in civil and other spheres.
- Since the woman was created as a helper to her husband, as the bearer of children, and as a “keeper at home”, the God-ordained and proper sphere of dominion for a wife is the household and that which is connected with the home.
- God’s command to “be fruitful and multiply” still applies to married couples.
- Christian parents must provide their children with a thoroughly Christian education, one that teaches the Bible and the biblical view of God and the world.
- Both sons and daughters are under the command of their father as long as they are under his roof or as long as they are the recipients of his provision and protection.

Michael Farris notes three examples of patriarchal teaching: that women should not vote, that higher education is not important for women, and that "unmarried adult women are subject to their fathers’ authority."

According to Rachel Held Evans, the biblical patriarchy movement is "committed to preserving as much of the patriarchal structure of Old Testament law as possible."

== Practices ==
Some churches connected to Biblical patriarchy practice "household voting" in the church, where only the male heads of households cast votes in church elections (exceptions in some cases allowed for households where there is no male head, such as the male having died).

Many members of the biblical patriarchy movement are also homeschoolers.

== Differences with complementarianism ==
Biblical patriarchy is similar to complementarianism, and many of their differences are only ones of degree and emphasis. While complementarianism holds to exclusively male leadership in the church and in the home, biblical patriarchy extends that exclusion to the civic sphere as well, so that women should not be civil leaders and indeed should not have careers outside the home. Thus, William Einwechter refers to the traditional complementarian view as "two point complementarianism" (male leadership in the family and church), and regards the biblical patriarchy view as "three-point" or "full" complementarianism (male leadership in family, church, and society). Similarly, Dale Partridge says, "Unlike the complementarian view, which confines male leadership to the familial and ecclesiastical domains, biblical patriarchy is consistent by extending male authority to all societal aspects, including civil governance and social life." This issue was discussed during Sarah Palin's vice presidential campaign in 2008, when some adherents of biblical patriarchy stated that Palin, as a woman, was "biblically ineligible to run for vice-president".

In contrast to this, Douglas Wilson rejects the idea that it is a sin for a woman to run for public office. John Piper and Wayne Grudem, representing the complementarian position, say that they are "not as sure in this wider sphere which roles can be carried out by men or women".

== Criticism ==
Biblical patriarchy has been criticised for holding views that demean women and view them as property. Don and Joy Veinot of Midwest Christian Outreach interpret the Vision Forum statement to imply that "women really cannot be trusted as decision makers" and "unless a daughter marries, she functionally remains pretty much the 'property' of the father until he dies."

Andrew Sandlin criticizes biblical patriarchy for teaching the authority of fathers, whereas the Bible teaches the authority of both fathers and mothers. Sandlin argues that "whenever the Bible has in mind children’s obligation to parents, it never depicts a paternal hierarchy, only a parental hierarchy", that "the father has no more say in the children’s rearing than the mother", and that "the Bible does not teach that the father is the head of the household". Elsewhere, Sandlin argues that a "renewed patriarchalism in some quarters is working for hegemony over the other legitimate spheres of God’s authority." In other words, the authority of the father dominates other authority structures in the church and in society. Sandlin writes that some patriarchalists "have gone so far as to suggest that Christian day schools are sinful or erosive of the family" and to "demand almost unswerving obedience and servanthood from their forty-year old married sons."

Michael Farris takes issue with the teaching that women should not vote, and argues that "nothing in the Bible can possibly be twisted to expand the duties between a husband and wife in a loving marriage to reach the conclusion that Bill Maher can vote but Vickie Farris cannot."

In 2008 Cynthia Kunsman ran a workshop at Midwestern Baptist Theological Seminary (sponsored by Evangelical Ministries to New Religions) critiquing biblical patriarchy. She described it as an "intolerant ideology" that has arisen within circles of the Christian homeschool movement during the last two decades. She suggested that the biblical patriarchy movement was guilty of subordinationism, and identified the Council on Biblical Manhood and Womanhood, the Federal Vision movement, and Southern Baptist Theological Seminary as adherents of biblical patriarchy. In response, both EMNR and MBTS accused Kunsman of making "unwarranted and misinformed accusations against Christian teachers and ministries, including the Council on Biblical Manhood and Womanhood and agencies within the Southern Baptist Convention."

== See also ==
- Christian head covering
- Family Integrated Church
- Gender roles in Christianity
- Male chauvinism
- Patriarchy
- Quiverfull
- Stay-at-home daughter
