= Vyckie Garrison =

Former Quiverfull activist

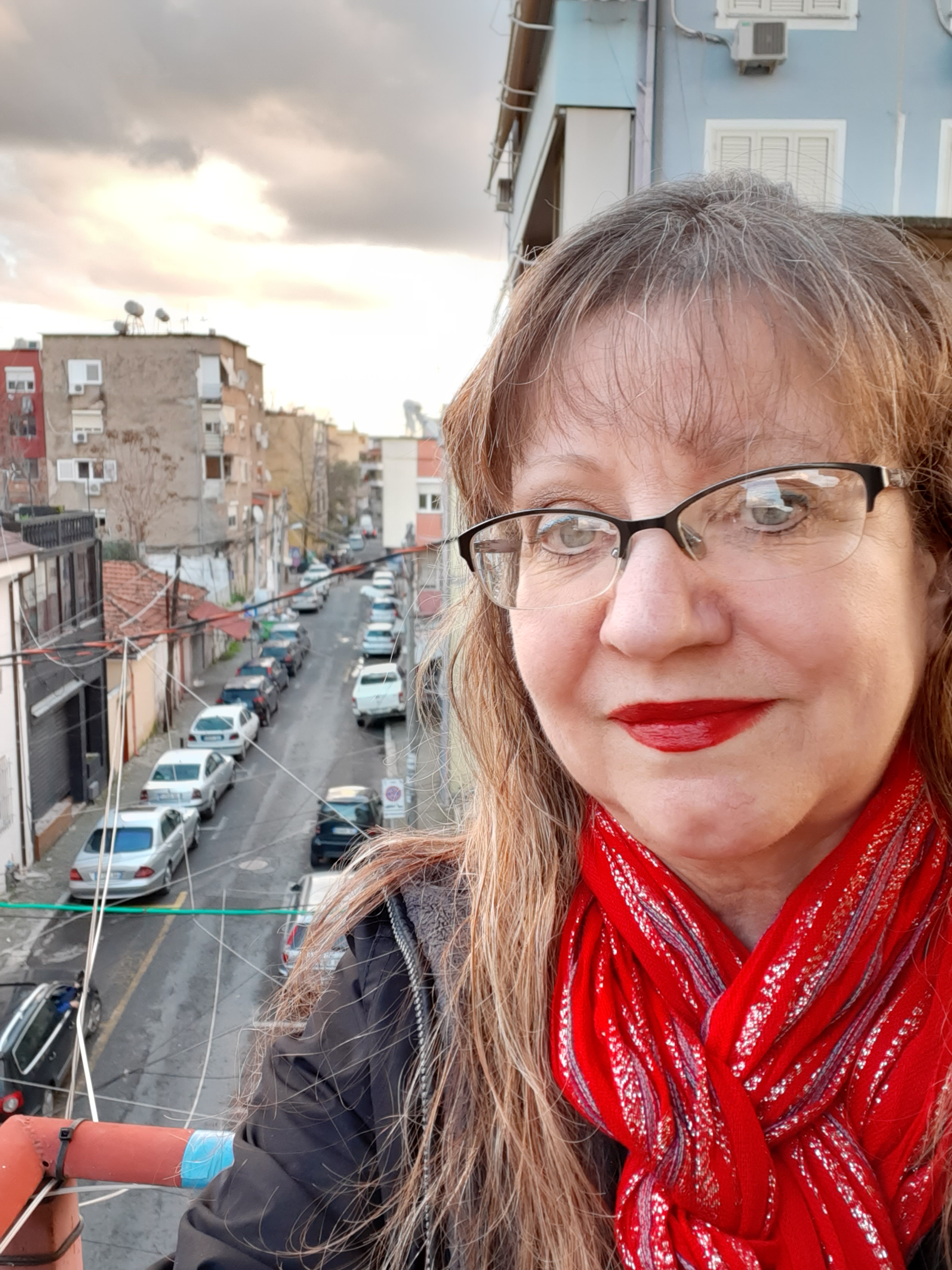
Vyckie Garrison selfie overlooking cityscape 12/2020

Vyckie Garrison (born December 14, 1965) is a former member of the Quiverfull movement. She published a "pro-life, pro-family" newspaper, The Nebraska Family Times, widely circulated in northeast Nebraska. The newspaper was fundamentalist and theocratic, but not necessarily aimed at families that adhered to Quiverfull philosophy. She wrote articles for various publications for Christian homeschoolers. After leaving the movement, she began a blog No Longer Quivering.

== Biography ==
Garrison was born in Yuba City, California on December 14, 1965. At 16, in the early 1980s, she married a high school boyfriend and moved to Carson City, Nevada subsisting on Job Corps positions. Garrison began listening to a Christian radio station and attending a Pentecostal church. Garrison's marriage ended, and she became pregnant with her oldest daughter during a short-lived affair. She moved to Iowa to be near her mother and met Warren Bennett at a church picnic. She was married to Bennett for 18 years, and had six children with him. Garrison followed a new pastor's counsel to homeschool her growing family, which eventually led her to the Quiverfull movement.

She and her husband wrote and published a newspaper for families that adhered to the Quiverfull philosophy, and wrote articles for various publications for Christian homeschoolers. Her husband, Warren, was blinded in a work accident and, she says, had trouble keeping a job. She says she founded their paper in part to create a sales position for him, to maintain the illusion of his heading their family. She includes an example of her writing for the Quiverfull movement in the blog entry "Vyckie's Tour de Crap: Quiverfull and the Life of the Mother."

The Bennetts were named Nebraska's "family of the year" in 2003 by the Nebraska Family Council, a nonprofit that works "to uphold biblical principles in society."

Her third child was born by caesarean section. Her doctor at the time advised her that her life would be endangered by future pregnancies, so her husband had a vasectomy. Shortly after the vasectomy, she was introduced, via her Christian homeschooling friends, to Mary Pride's "The Way Home: Beyond Feminism and Back to Reality" and "God's Plans for Families" by Nancy Campbell. She shared the anti-birth control, pro-natalist views she'd gleaned from those books with Warren, who subsequently underwent a vasectomy reversal.

Her seventh child, Wesley, was born by emergency caesarean section, at the Faith Regional Hospital. She had planned to give birth at home, without attendance by a medical professional, but her uterus partially ruptured during labour, almost killing her. Her doctor advised her that her life would be in danger if she continued to conceive, but this was not consistent with her beliefs, believing that, "Jesus died for us, we should be willing to die for him." She became pregnant twice more, suffering two miscarriages.

Garrison asserts that her then-husband beat and emotionally bullied their children and that one of her children attempted suicide. Garrison began corresponding with an intellectual atheist uncle whose questions helped her acknowledge her mounting crisis of faith. When, during a brief separation, Garrison's husband sent her a list of the ways in which she had been disobedient, she filed for divorce and won custody of all seven children.

She now considers herself to be an atheist. In 2015 American Atheists named her the 2014 Atheist of the Year.

== Activism ==
Garrison co-founded the blog No Longer Quivering, an online resource for women leaving Quiverfull or similar movements, in 2009. In her first blog, on March 12, 2009, she writes "to those godly, dedicated Christians" who know her from her articles and testimonies that appeared in various Christian homeschool publications, to explain why she has left the movement.

On Easter Sunday, 2014, and again in April 2015 she addressed the American Atheists conference about her experiences.

== See also ==
- Biblical patriarchy
- Christian movements
- Christian views on contraception
- Dominion Theology
- Natalism
- Patriarchy
