= Widow's Might (disambiguation) =

Widow's Might is a 1935 British comedy film.

Widow's Might or The Widow's Might may also refer to:

- The Widow's Might (1918 film), a lost American silent comedy film
- The Widow's Might, a 2009 American drama film

== See also ==
- Lesson of the widow's mite
- Widow's Mite, an estate in the U.S.
