= Vision Forum =

Evangelical Christian organization (1998–2014) based in Texas

Vision Forum was an evangelical Christian organization based in San Antonio, Texas. It was founded in 1998; its president was Doug Phillips, son of U.S. Constitution Party leader Howard Phillips. Vision Forum Ministries was a 501(c) non-profit organization which was closed by its board of directors in November 2013 after Doug Phillips' confession of marital infidelity and allegations of sexual abuse. The associated commercial operation, called Vision Forum, Inc., continued to operate until January 2014, when it was announced that it too was shutting down operations. Vision Forum advocated for biblical patriarchy, creationism, homeschooling, Family Integrated Churches, and Quiverfull beliefs.

== Events ==
The organization sponsored the Christian Filmmakers Academy and the San Antonio Independent Christian Film Festival.

In 2007, the group organized an alternative celebration of the 400th anniversary of the founding of Jamestown, Virginia, saying that the official celebration did not give enough emphasis to the Christian perspective of the settlers.

== Jonathan Park ==
Jonathan Park is a radio drama series created by Pat and Sandy Roy at the Institute for Creation Research in the late 1990s that was later produced by Vision Forum Ministries. The storyline revolves around the lives and families of fictional characters Dr. Kendall Park and Jim Brenan as they build a creation museum.

After Vision Forum folded, ownership of the Jonathan Park series was transferred to CreationWorks, a ministry founded by series creators Pat and Sandy Roy. One album was released under that banner in 2014 before the series was acquired by Wise King Media in 2016.

=== Albums ===
- Volume 1: Jonathan Park: The Adventure Begins. ISBN 978-1-929241-85-9.
- Volume 2: Jonathan Park: No Looking Back. ISBN 978-1-929241-87-3.
- Volume 3: Jonathan Park: The Winds of Change. ISBN 978-0-9755263-6-1.
- Volume 4: Jonathan Park: The Hunt for Beowulf. ISBN 978-0-9787559-1-1.
- Volume 5: Jonathan Park: The Explorer's Society. ISBN 978-0-9787559-6-6.
- Volume 6: Jonathan Park: The Journey Never Taken. ISBN 978-1-933431-84-0.
- Volume 7: Jonathan Park: The Voyage Beyond. ISBN 978-1-933431-86-4.
- Volume 8: Jonathan Park: The Copper Scroll. ISBN 978-1-937460-15-0.
- Volume 9: Jonathan Park: The Whispering Sphinx. ISBN 978-1-937460-62-4.
- Volume 10: Jonathan Park: The Journey Home. ISBN 978-1-941510-28-5.
- Jonathan Park Goes to the Zoo. ISBN 978-1-934554-28-9.
- Jonathan Park Goes to the Aquarium. ISBN 978-1-934554-29-6.
- Jonathan Park Goes to the Galapagos. ISBN 978-1-933431-74-1.
- Jonathan Park Goes to the Amazon. ISBN 978-0-9829452-6-1.

== Criticism ==
Vision Forum was criticized for holding views that were demeaning of women and viewed them as property. Don and Joy Veinot of Midwest Christian Outreach interpreted Vision Forum's statement on "The Tenets of Biblical Patriarchy" to imply that "women really cannot be trusted as decision makers" and "unless a daughter marries, she functionally remains pretty much the property of the father until he dies."

Similar criticisms were voiced when a lawsuit was filed against Doug Phillips and Vision Forum by a woman who had worked as the Phillips family's nanny. Her suit alleged that Phillips had sexually abused her for years. Phillips acknowledged an "inappropriate relationship" but denied all charges of sexual abuse, calling them "sensationalist and suggesting that they are motivated by a desire for financial gain."

== Bibliography ==
- Veinot, L. L. (Don); Veinot, Joy (Spring 2007). "The Cult of Character" (PDF). Midwest Christian Outreach Journal. Archived from the original (PDF) on February 19, 2009.
