= R. C. Sproul Jr. =

American author, theologian and former pastor

- Born: July 1, 1965 (age 61)
- Theological work
- Tradition or movement: Calvinism, Postmillennialism
- Main interests: Calvinism, the character of God, classical apologetics

Robert Craig Sproul, better known as R. C. Sproul Jr., (born July 1, 1965) is an American Calvinist writer, theologian, and pastor, and the son of R. C. Sproul.

== Life ==
Sproul holds degrees from Grove City College (Bachelor of Arts in Philosophy and Literature, 1986) and Reformed Theological Seminary (Master of Arts in Theological Studies, 1991) and received his D.Min. in theology from Whitefield Theological Seminary (2001).

In 1989 Sproul began working for Ligonier Ministries in Orlando, Florida. In 1996 he moved to Meadowview, Virginia where he founded Highlands Study Center (later renamed Highlands Ministries). Sproul served as executive editor of Every Thought Captive, a monthly magazine published by Highlands Ministries. Sproul planted Saint Peter Presbyterian Church in Bristol, Virginia in 1996 serving as senior pastor until 2001, then as Associate Pastor of Education until 2010. From 2009 to 2010, he worked as a teacher for Veritas Press, which specializes in Christian educational texts.

In 2010, Sproul was appointed a Teaching Fellow and associate professor of theology, philosophy, and apologetics at Ligonier Academy in both the Bible college and D.Min. programs. In 2014 he was named Rector at Reformation Bible College as well as the Chair of the Department of Theology and Philosophy.

In August 2015, Sproul wrote in his personal blog that he had briefly visited the Ashley Madison website in 2014. As a result, Ligonier Ministries suspended him until July 2016. Sproul had addressed the recently announced Ashley Madison data breach in a July 22, 2015, blog entry that highlighted "the biblical truth that our sins will find us out", but without the acknowledgment made in August.

On November 29, 2016, ten days after his ecclesiastical wedding ceremony, Sproul was arrested in Fort Wayne, Indiana, for drunken driving with two of his minor children in the car. He posted a $5,000 bond and was free under a "monitored conditional release." On June 2, 2017, Sproul filed a plea agreement in which he pled guilty to one felony count, 9-30-5-3(a)(2)/F6: Operating Veh. While Intox or Controlled Substance: Passenger Under 18. He was sentenced to a prison term of 1 year 183 days. Under the terms of the plea agreement his prison sentence was suspended and he was remanded to 1 year supervised probation.

On December 9, 2016, days after his arrest, the board of directors of Ligonier Ministries and Reformation Bible College received and affirmed Sproul's resignation request. Ligonier Ministries posted a statement on their website on December 12, 2016, saying that Sproul resigned "for personal reasons".

In early 2019, Sproul briefly worked as website manager for Bucs Dugout, SB Nation's community for Pittsburgh Pirates fans. His contract was terminated the morning after Deadspin's piece criticizing the hire. Later that year he became ordained through Logos Ministries and formed Dunamis Fellowship (details under Church allegiances).

=== Personal life ===
Sproul has been married twice. Sproul's first wife, Denise Elizabeth Sproul (née Rocklein), died in 2011, age 46, of cancer. They have seven surviving children; a disabled daughter died in 2012.

On October 14, 2016, Sproul married Lisa Carol Ringel (née Porter) in a civil ceremony. On November 19, 2016, his father R. C. Sproul Sr. officiated the church wedding ceremony. Ten days after his ecclesiastical wedding ceremony, Sproul, Jr's DUI occurred. Lisa, a nutritionist, legally adopted the four youngest Sproul children on July 12, 2018. Combined they have twelve surviving children, eleven grandchildren and currently reside in Indiana.

Several years after his father's death, Sproul Jr filed a trust complaint against the RC Sproul Trust Agreement trustee, mother Vesta Sproul; and the successor trustee, his sister. The Seminole County Florida probate case was filed in 2021 and, after a number of motions, voluntarily dismissed July 11, 2023.

== Church allegiances ==
Sproul was first ordained in the Associate Reformed Presbyterian Church (ARP). After a failed attempt to transfer to the Presbyterian Church in America, he was ordained in the Reformed Presbyterian Church General Assembly (RPCGA) in 2000.

In January 2006, Sproul and the Session of Saint Peter Presbyterian Church (SPPC), its governing body, were deposed from office by the RPCGA under charges including "abuse of authority in an inexcusable manner" against several families, alleged illegal use of the ARP's tax identification number, planting a church without authority, and practicing infant communion. The SPPC Session issued a letter of apology and asked to be released from general membership in the RPCGA, and the denomination granted their request. SPPC requested pastoral oversight from the CREC, which accepted the congregation as a full member in October 2007. The Confederation of Reformed Evangelical Churches (CREC) examined the case and accepted Sproul as an ordained minister in good standing in 2006. In 2010 Sproul transferred his ordination to the denomination Covenant Presbyterian Church (CPC).

On March 27, 2019, Sproul announced, "I am a member in good standing at Pine Hills Church here in Fort Wayne. It is a part of the Federation of Evangelical Churches." The FEC is an Anabaptist denomination of Amish Mennonite origin.

July 2, 2019, Sproul became ordained through Logos Ministries of Florida and formed the business entity Dunamis Fellowship. February 14, 2021, Sproul planted his newest church, Sovereign Grace Fellowship in Fort Wayne, Indiana. Sproul announced April 3, 2021, he would launch the Shepherd's College, August 30, 2021, as a pastors college for training and mentoring men nationally and internationally.

== Publishing ==
Sproul has written twelve books, including When You Rise Up: A Covenantal Approach to Homeschooling, Bound for Glory, Biblical Economics, Almighty Over All, Eternity in Our Hearts, and Tearing Down Strongholds. He has edited four books, including After Darkness Light: Distinctives of Reformed Theology, and contributed to several others. He was a regular columnist for World magazine, Homeschooling Today magazine and the Covenant Syndicate. He was featured in the film BIRTH CONTROL: How Did We Get Here? which was runner-up to the Best Sanctity of Life film in the 2013 San Antonio Independent Christian Film Festival organized by Doug Phillips.

For eleven years he was the editor of Tabletalk magazine, a publication of Ligonier Ministries.

In Almighty Over All Sproul takes the position that God created man to have an object worthy of his wrath: "God is as delighted with his wrath as he is with all of his attributes... What I’ll do is create something worthy of my wrath, something on which I can exhibit the glory of my wrath" (p. 52). Sproul goes on to state that God is the author/creator of sin: "I am not accusing God of sinning; I am suggesting that He created sin" (p. 54).

== Books ==
- Money Matters, 1985. Reprinted as Dollar Signs of the Times: A Commonsense Guide to Securing Our Economic Future, 1994, and Biblical Economics: A Commonsense Guide to Our Daily Bread, 2002. Supplemented with Biblical Economics Study Guide in 2010.
- Almighty over All: Understanding the Sovereignty of God, 1999.
- Quothe the Prophet, 2000.
- The Brave Monk, 2000.
- Eternity in Our Hearts, 2002.
- Tearing Down Strongholds: And Defending the Truth, 2002.
- Bound for Glory: God's Promise for Your Family, 2003
- When You Rise Up: A Covenantal Approach to Homeschooling, 2004.
- Believing God: Twelve Biblical Promises Christians Struggle to Accept, 2009.
- The Call to Wonder: Loving God like a Child, 2012.
