= Dale Partridge =

American pastor and author (born 1985)

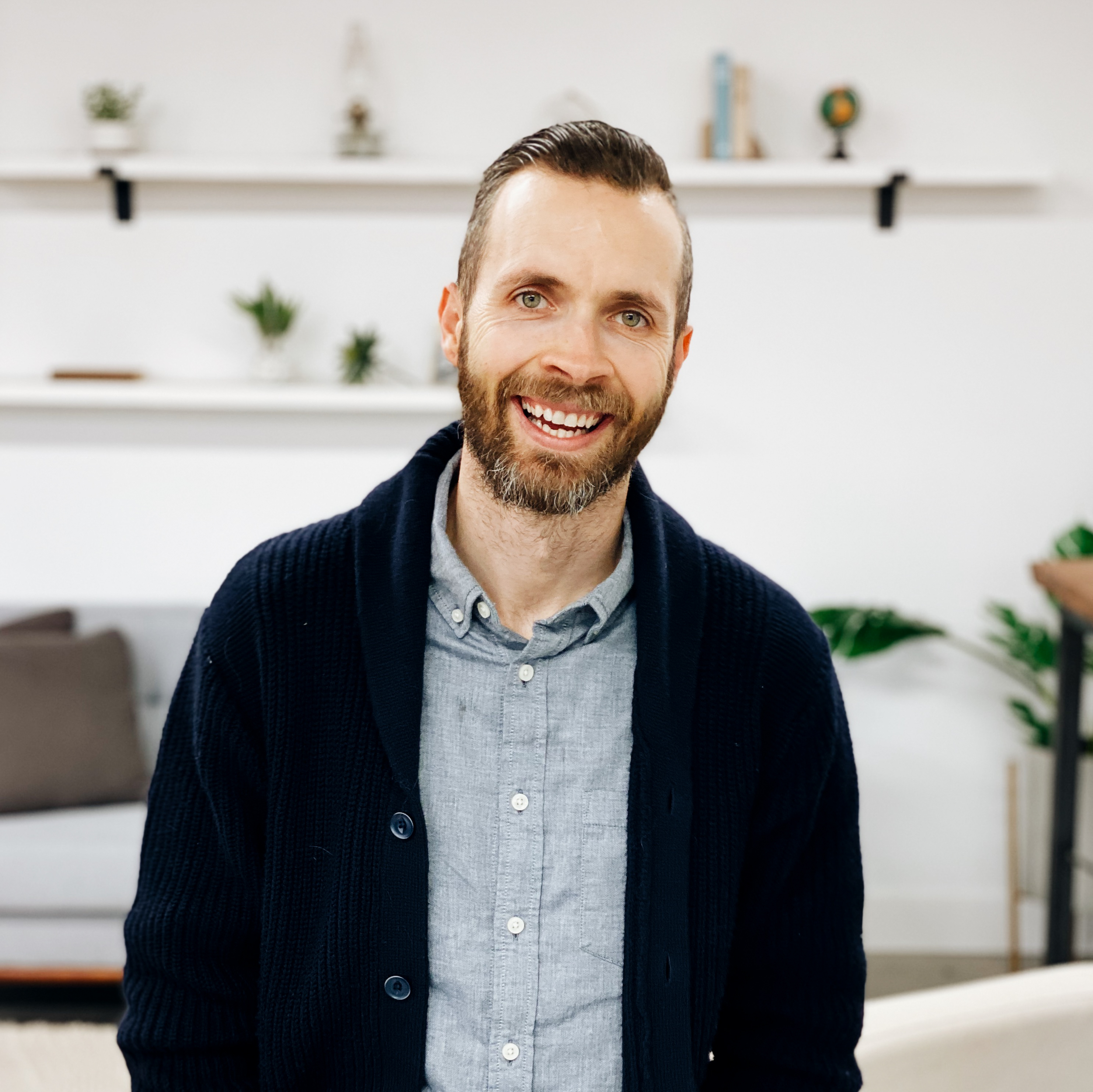
- Partridge in 2019

Personal life
- Born: Dale James Partridge; April 10, 1985 (age 41) Upland, California, U.S.
- Spouse: Veronica Partridge (m. 2010)
- Children: 4
- Occupation: Theologian, pastor, author
- Website: dalepartridge.com

Religious life
- Religion: Christianity

Dale James Partridge (born April 10, 1985) is an American Reformed Christian theologian, pastor and author, who serves as the lead teaching pastor at King's Way Reformed Church in Prescott, Arizona. He is also the president of Relearn.org and founder of Reformation Seminary. According to Vivian Yee, writing for the New York Times, Partridge has attracted an online following for his "incendiary commentary". Partridge calls himself an "aspiring general in the culture war".

== Early life and education ==
Partridge grew up in Southern California, where he attended high school and started several businesses in his late teens, including a personal training and massage therapy business. In 2018, Partridge enrolled at Western Seminary in Portland, Oregon, where he earned a graduate certificate in theology.

== Career ==
In his early days, Partridge pursued a baseball career which ended early due to an arm injury. He then switched to entrepreneurship and eventually founded Thresh Hold Rock Climbing Gym in Riverside, California, in 2005. In 2011, Partridge founded the e-commerce website Sevenly.org, and in 2018, StartupCamp.com. Before entering the ministry, Partridge was a business author. He left the business world in 2017 to pursue a career in ministry.

Bob Smietana, writing for Religion News Service, includes Partridge in his list of "Jim Crow theobros", and suggests that Partridge has "rebranded himself" from a "lifestyle blogger and social justice evangelical entrepreneur" to a "chain-smoking, hardcore Christian nationalist".

=== Ministry ===
Partridge leads a digital ministry, Relearn.org, that is focused on biblical Christian and theological literacy. In addition, Partridge hosts a weekly podcast, Real Christianity. In 2023, he became senior pastor at King's Way Reformed Church in Prescott, Arizona.

=== Instances of plagiarism ===
Several plagiarism claims have been made against Partridge, including instances where he allegedly posted content from Martin Luther King Jr., Ricky Martin, Ron Finley, and John Wooden, without proper attribution or citation. Partridge has publicly admitted to and apologized for past plagiarism, attributing his actions to a combination of "past immaturity" and "[failure] to be careful" stemming from his former belief in "'the uncopyright movement,' which put forth the idea that 'all ideas are God's ideas'".

Partridge said that "before I found faith in Christ, specifically between 2010 and 2014, I would thoughtlessly share tweets and social media posts without acknowledging the original source, giving people the impression that their words were mine." He maintains that while he "stopped this blatant form of plagiarism after [his] conversion in late 2014, [he] struggled with more subtle forms of plagiarism until 2018-2019", whereby he would "unintentionally reproduce short phrases without proper citation or add a sentence into a podcast from my research notes without mentioning the source". As of 2023, he maintains that he has "made significant changes to [his] publishing process to ensure proper citations, multiple rounds of third-party editing (especially for books), and the use of plagiarism detection software to catch any unintentional plagiarism".

== Political views ==
=== Mental health ===
In 2019, he argued against electing people with mental illnesses to church leadership positions after his friend and fellow pastor committed suicide.

=== Women ===
Partridge has been outspoken about traditional male and female roles in the church, as well as a proponent for headcoverings for women during prayer and worship in accordance with his study of 1 Corinthians 11:1–14. In 2024, Partridge made a series of tweets arguing that "in a Christian marriage, a wife should vote according to her husband’s direction". He said in 2026 that women should not vote in the United States and the 19th Amendment should be repealed. In 2015, on the TV show Good Morning America, Partridge revealed that his views on women's leggings influenced his wife to discard it from her wardrobe.

=== Race ===
Partridge opposes interracial marriages, although his wife is Mexican American.

In June 2026, while giving a sermon at his church, Partridge called for the return of African colonization. He claimed that God assigned Africans, as descendants of Ham, to be ruled over by Whites, Europeans, Asians, Jews, and Arabs, whom he claimed are the descendants of Shem and Japhet.

=== LGBT issues ===
Partridge has spoken out against what he perceives as the influence of what he calls the "transgender movement" on children. In 2022, as an alternative to Drag Queen Story Hour, Partridge hosted "Pastor Story Hour" in his Arizona hometown. That year, Partridge released a children's book, Jesus and My Gender, in which he affirms what he sees as the biblical model for gender.

=== The Holocaust and Israel ===
In August 2026 on the subject of Jewish activities in Germany during the Weimar Republic and Nazi Germany, Partridge said the country had been "attacked from within by grossly immoral Jewish forces during the Weimar Republic" and that the "Nazi movement terrified the Jews because it represented a powerful form of Christian nationalism."

=== Other religions ===
Partridge has called freedom of religion "a really bad idea". He believes that non-Christian religions, such as Islam and paganism, should be banned from being practiced under US law, stating "there should be no worship of any other gods". He has called Islam "an existential threat to western civilization" and believes that Muslims should be converted to Christianity.

== Personal life ==
In 2015, the owner of the land neighboring the property owned by Partridge and his wife filed a lawsuit against them in Deschutes County Circuit Court. She alleged that they "willfully cut down 'ancient' juniper trees on her property to improve their view" and requested $150,000 in damages. The plaintiff's lawyer alleged, "It's not just like they're on the property line. They're 250–300 feet onto my client's property." In a response statement, Partridge said that he was "really shocked" and that "the whole truth [would] eventually come out." He declined to elaborate further, stating that he had been "instructed to keep [his] words for the courtroom". Later, in 2016, the lawsuit was settled out of court.

Partridge is married to Veronica, a Mexican American woman. In January 2026, he stated that interracial marriage is not the "ideal". According to Premier Christian News, his remarks drew a backlash "for perceived hypocrisy".

== Publications ==
- Partridge, Dale. (2015), People Over Profit: Break the System, Live with Purpose, Be More Successful, Nashville, Thomas Nelson Publishing. ISBN 9780718021740
- Partridge, Dale. (2017), Launch Your Dream: A 30-Day Plan for Turning Your Passion into Your Profession, Nashville, Thomas Nelson Publishing. ISBN 9780718093419
- Partridge, Dale. (2018), Saved from Success: How God Can Free You from Culture's Distortion of Family, Work, and the Good Life, Nashville, Thomas Nelson Publishing. ISBN 9780718093440
- Partridge, Dale. (2019), Real Christianity: How to Be Bold for Christ In a Culture of Darkness, Prescott, Arizona, Relearn Press. ISBN 9781733983310
- Partridge, Dale. (2021), How We Do House Church: The Biblical Doctrines and Convictions of Reformation Fellowship, Prescott, Arizona, Relearn Press. ISBN 979-8985749243
- Partridge, Dale. (2022), The Manliness of Christ: How the Masculinity of Jesus Eradicates Effeminate Christianity, Prescott, Arizona, Relearn Press. ISBN 978-1733983396
- Partridge, Dale. (2022), The Ground of Good Theology: A Beginner's Guide for the Faithful Study of God, Prescott, Arizona, Relearn Press. ISBN 979-8985749243
- Partridge, Dale. (2022), Jesus and My Gender: Affirming Your Child's God-Given Gender, Prescott, Arizona, Relearn Press. ISBN 979-8985749236
- Partridge, Dale. (2023), A Cover for Glory: A Biblical Defense for Headcoverings, Prescott, Arizona, Relearn Press. ISBN 979-8985749250
