= Inter-generational ministry =

Christian organization

Inter-generational ministry or intergenerational ministry is a model of Christian ministry which emphasizes relationships between age groups and encourages mixed-age activities.

== Contrast with traditional models ==
Inter-generational ministry stands in contrast with other modes of ministry more traditionally seen in local churches, such as Sunday schools and youth ministries.

In Sunday school, children, youths, and sometimes adults, are instructed by teachers who are, typically, adults. Classes are usually divided by age groups, as in secular schools. In youth ministries, teens or young adults (especially college age) gather in groups presided over by a "youth minister". These groups, which are often part of parachurch organizations, focus on peer fellowship and instruction of their members.

These modes of ministry segregate members by age, and presuppose a hierarchical ministry in which more experienced, more educated, and generally older members minister didactically to their charges. Inter-generational activities, by contrast, emphasize a mixture of ages, and de-emphasize formal teacher-pupil relationships.

== Motivation ==
Inter-generational ministry is one of a number of movements which have arisen in response over concerns that young adults very commonly cease participation in church, and often do not return. Proponents of the inter-generational ministry movement hold that the hierarchical and didactic roles found in traditional church ministries deprive teens and young adults of a sense of purpose and involvement, since their role in these ministries is passive and subordinate, and since they are often kept separate from adult activities. Therefore, they propose that younger members should take active roles in the ministry of the local church, and that church activities should involve and encourage participation from members across a wide range of ages.

A second thread in the inter-generational ministry movement is that of family involvement. Concerns over divorce, abuse and other family disruptions led to criticism of how traditional church activities typically segregate family members according to age, thus de-emphasizing family relationships. Inter-generational activities were seen as a means to involve families as units, thus reinforcing family bonds.

Studies show that children attending Sunday Schools and youth programs are less likely to continue church involvement, compared to those who attended worship with parents, and are integrated into a community (e.g., Mark de Vries Family-Based Youth Ministry, 2004). Those children who continue church involvement as adults often have a 'nominal faith' (e.g. George Barna Transforming children into Spiritual Champions, 2003).

Proponents of this mode of ministry claim it is a Biblical model - particularly when the ministry is located within the family in accordance with the 'relational' Hebrew model described in Deuteronomy 6.

A movement of family integrated churches has arisen within American evangelicalism. The National Center for Family-Integrated Churches lists around 800 affiliated churches.

However, with growing frequency of non-traditional families, Scott Wilcher ("The Orphaned Generation: The Father's Heart for Connecting Youth and Young Adults to your Church") suggests a broadening of the interpretation of family from a birth family to a spiritual family into which all believers are adopted. The book encourages inter-generational discipleship by identifying current conceptual metaphors that the adult church uses to organize their thinking and speech about young people, (animals, aliens and closed spaces) and suggest reframing those thoughts with the metaphor of "orphan in need of a wise guide." He argues that Hollywood has primed a generation of movie goers to expect that young heroes require a wise guide in order to gain a new identity, a new community, and the path to their destiny, which creates a valuable opportunity for the adult Christians to become the Obi-Wan Kenobi, Gandalf, Rafiki, Mr. Miyagi or Alfred to a young person.

== History ==
Many denominations have instituted offices or programs which focus on inter-generational ministry.

- The Presbyterian Church (USA) has an office of Family and Intergenerational Ministries
- The Lutheran Church–Missouri Synod has a list of res.pdf Intergenerational resources on its website.
