= Covenant Presbyterian Church =

Protestant Reformed denomination in the U.S.

- Classification: Protestant
- Theology: Reformed
- Polity: Presbyterian
- Region: United States
- Origin: 2006
- Separated from: Reformed Presbyterian Church General Assembly
- Congregations: 12
- Official website: covenant-presbyterian.org

The Covenant Presbyterian Church (CPC) is a Protestant, Reformed denomination, founded in the United States in 2006 by a group of churches that split from the Reformed Presbyterian Church General Assembly.

== History ==
The Presbyterian churches originate from the Protestant Reformation of the 16th century. They adhere to Reformed theology and have a form of ecclesiastical organization that is characterized by the government of an assembly of elders. Government Presbyterian is common in Protestant churches that were modeled after the Reformation Protestant Switzerland they notably developed in Switzerland, Scotland, Netherlands, France and portions of Prussia, of Ireland and, later, of the United States.

In 1983, the Reformed Presbyterian Church, Evangelical Synod (RPCES) merged with the Presbyterian Church in America (PCA). A group of churches in the PCA's Georgia Presbytery later objected to the way the merged denomination made its decisions. These churches separated from the PCA and formed the Presbytery of the Covenant.

This presbytery grew, and in 1985 split into four presbyteries, thus organizing the assembly of the Reformed Presbyterian Church in the United States. In 1990, the denomination changed its name to the Reformed Presbyterian Church in the Americas.

In 1991, the four presbyteries of the RPCA came into conflict. One of these was Hanover Presbytery, which became a separate denomination, the Reformed Presbyterian Church - Hanover Presbytery. Meanwhile, Westminster Presbytery and Geneva Presbytery formed the Reformed Presbyterian Church General Assembly (RPCGA), leaving the fourth presbytery as a remnant of the Reformed Presbyterian Church in the United States.

In 2006, four churches and nine elders left the RPCGA to form the Covenant Presbyterian Church (CPC). Among the main causes for the formation of the denomination was a desire for presbyterian polity and to allow liberty for local Sessions to practice paedo-communion.

The CPC has grown, currently counting 12 member churches.

== Doctrine ==
The CPC, like other Presbyterian denominations, subscribes to the Westminster Confession of Faith, Westminster Larger Catechism and Westminster Shorter Catechism.

Its unincorporated churches adhere to young earth creationism and male head-of-household voting.

The denomination practices parity of elders, emphasizes Christian education for students of all ages, seeks a balanced measure of elder qualifications (character & doctrine) with no strict requirement for a seminary degree, and is conservative in its doctrines and practices, opposing same-sex unions and abortion.
