= Quiverfull =

Pro-natalist Christian movement

Quiverfull is a Christian theological position that sees large families as a blessing from God. It encourages procreation through the abstention from all forms of birth control, and sterilization reversal. The movement took its name from Psalm 127:3–5, where many children are metaphorically referred to as the arrows in a full quiver.

Some sources have referred to the Quiverfull position as providentialism, while other sources have simply referred to it as a manifestation of natalism.

It is most widespread in the United States but it also has adherents in Canada, Australia, New Zealand, the United Kingdom, and elsewhere. One 2006 estimate put the number of families which subscribe to this philosophy as ranging from "the thousands to the low tens of thousands".

== Historical background ==
As birth-control methods advanced during the late 19th and early 20th centuries, many conservative Christian movements issued official statements against their use, citing their incompatibility with biblical beliefs and ideals.

In addition, there are those who contend that Quiverfull's "internal growth" model is a manifestation of a broader trend which is reflected in the lifestyles of such groups as Orthodox Jews (particularly Haredi and Hasidic Jews) and certain Christians including Orthodox Calvinists of the Netherlands, traditional Anabaptists (such as Old Order Amish, Old Colony Mennonites, and certain Conservative Mennonites), some traditional Methodists of the conservative holiness movement, and Laestadian Lutherans of Finland. The former may also be a case of a manifestation of a movement of opinion within some ethnic, linguistic, religious, regional, or other identifiable groups whose members have expressed concern about their continued existence for historical or other reasons. Such philosophies and groups are diverse amongst themselves—being found in all segments and sectors of the political spectrum—and they usually represent, to varying extents, the diversity within their group. The manifestations of such movements and opinions include everything from comparatively high rates of in-group marriage being applauded and gently suggested, to more explicit calls for endogamy such as is the case with the Druze, to concerns which were expressed by Protestants in Northern Ireland about a higher birth rate amongst Catholics, to Decree 770 which was issued by Nicolae Ceaușescu's government in Romania with regard to contraception, and other population topics as part of its local variant of the North Korean ideology of Juche.

=== Anglican allowance of birth control ===
In 1930, the Lambeth Conference issued a statement permitting birth control: "Where there is a clearly felt moral obligation to limit or avoid parenthood, complete abstinence is the primary and obvious method", but if there was morally sound reasoning for avoiding abstinence, "the Conference agrees that other methods may be used, provided that this is done in the light of Christian principles". Primary materials on the contemporary debate indicate a wide variety of opinion on the matter. In the decades that followed, birth control became gradually accepted among many other mainline Protestants, even among some conservative evangelicals.

=== Early Quiverfull authors ===
Mary Pride's first book, The Way Home: Beyond Feminism, Back to Reality (1985), promotes the Quiverfull movement.

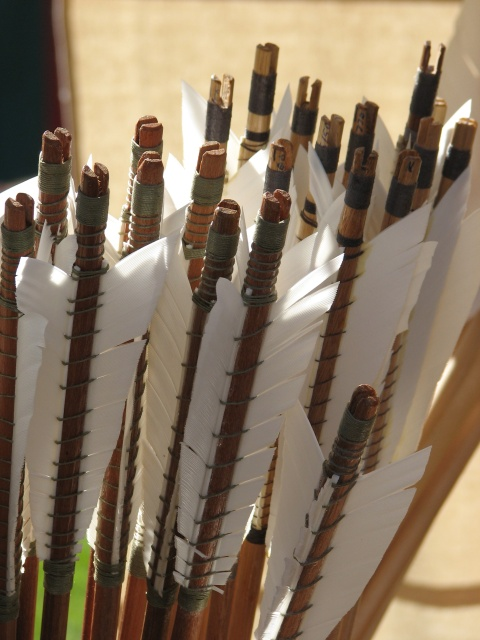
The Christian Quiverfull movement derives its name from Psalm 127:3–5, where many children are metaphorically referred to as the arrows in a full quiver.

In the 20th century, Quiverfull as a modern Christian movement began to emerge. Nancy Campbell began publishing her magazine Above Rubies, which promotes and glorifies stay-at-home mothers who have as many children as possible, in 1977. While Campbell is in measure responsible for formulating Quiverfull ideas, according Pride, the movement sparked most fully after the 1985 publication of Mary Pride's book The Way Home: Beyond Feminism, Back to Reality.

In her book, Pride chronicled her journey away from what she labeled feminist and anti-natal ideas of happiness (within which she had lived as an activist before her conversion to conservative evangelical Christianity in 1977) toward her discovery of happiness surrounding what she portrayed as the biblically mandated role of wives and mothers as bearers of children and workers in the home under the authority of a husband. Pride wrote that such a lifestyle was generally biblically required of all married Christian women, but feminism had duped most Christian women without their awareness, especially in their acceptance of birth control.

As the basis for her arguments, Pride selected numerous Bible verses in order to lay out what she saw as the biblical role of women. These included verses which she interpreted as perpetuating her advocacy of compulsory childbearing and her opposition to the use of birth control which (in her view) was promoted by "the feminist agenda" by which she had formerly lived. Pride's explanations then became a spearheading basis of Quiverfull.

The name of the Quiverfull movement comes from Psalm 127:3–5, which Pride cited in The Way Home:

Lo, children are an heritage of the LORD:
and the fruit of the womb is his reward.
As arrows are in the hand of a mighty man;
so are children of the youth.
Happy is the man that hath his quiver full of them:
they shall not be ashamed,
but they shall speak with the enemies in the gate.

— KJV

Pride stated in her book: "The church's sin which has caused us to become unsavory salt incapable of uplifting the society around us is selfishness, lack of love, refusing to consider children an unmitigated blessing. In a word, family planning."

=== Consolidation and growth of the movement ===
After the publication of Pride's The Way Home, her ideas spread through informal social networks. Around this time, numerous church pastors issued sermons which were in accord with Pride's ideas and various small publications and a few Quiverfull-oriented books appeared.

As the Internet expanded several years later, the informal networks gradually took on more organized forms as Quiverfull adherents developed numerous Quiverfull-oriented organizations, books, electronic mailing lists, websites, and digests, most notably The Quiverfull Digest. The largely decentralized "Quiverfull" movement resulted.

From their onset, Quiverfull ideas have sometimes had a polarizing effect among Christians who hold to them and Christians who are skeptical of or disagree with them.

== Motivations ==
=== Obedience to God ===
Quiverfull authors and adherents express their core motivation as a desire to obey God's commandments as stated in the Bible. Among these commandments, "be fruitful and multiply", "behold, children are a gift of the Lord", and passages showing God acting to open and close the womb are interpreted as giving a basis for their views. Quiverfull adherents typically maintain that their philosophy is first about an open, accepting and obedient attitude toward the possibility of bearing children. Within the view, this attitude may result in many, few or even no children, because God himself maintains sole provenance over conception and birth. The duty of the Quiverfull adherent is only to maintain an "open willingness" to joyfully receive and not thwart however many children God chooses to bestow. Contraception in all its forms is seen as inconsistent with this attitude and is thus entirely avoided, as is abortion.

=== Missionary effort ===
Quiverfull's principal authors and its adherents also describe their motivation as a missionary effort to raise up many children as Christians to advance the cause of the Christian religion. Its distinguishing viewpoint is to eagerly receive children as blessings from God, eschewing all forms of contraception, including natural family planning, and sterilization.

=== Population and demography ===
According to journalist Kathryn Joyce, writing in the magazine The Nation: "[T]he Quiverfull mission is rooted in faith, the unseen," even if "its mandate to be fruitful and multiply has tangible results as well." Others remark that Quiverfull resembles other world-denying fundamentalist movements that grow through internal reproduction and membership retention such as Orthodox Jews (particularly Haredi and Hasidic Jews), and certain Christian denominations (such as the Amish and Mennonites, and Laestadian Lutherans in Finland). Many are thriving as seculars and moderates have transitioned to below-replacement fertility.

== Beliefs ==
The cover of the 1990 A Full Quiver: Family Planning and the Lordship of Christ by Rick and Jan Hess.

The principal Quiverfull belief is that Christians should maintain a strongly welcoming attitude toward the possibility of bearing children. With minor exceptions, adherents reject birth control use as completely incompatible with this belief.

=== Majority doctrine ===
Most Quiverfull adherents regard children as unqualified blessings, gifts that should be received happily from God. Quiverfull authors Rick and Jan Hess argued for this belief in their 1990 book:

"Behold, children are a gift of the Lord." (Psa. 127:3) Do we really believe that? If children are a gift from God, let's for the sake of argument ask ourselves what other gift or blessing from God we would reject. Money? Would we reject great wealth if God gave it? Not likely! How about good health? Many would say that a man's health is his most treasured possession. But children? Even children given by God? "That's different!" some will plead! All right, is it different? God states right here in no-nonsense language that children are gifts. Do we believe His Word to be true?

Quiverfull authors such as Pride, Provan, and Hess extend this idea to mean that if one child is a blessing, then each additional child is likewise a blessing and not something to be viewed as economically burdensome or unaffordable. When a couple seeks to control family size via birth control they are thus "rejecting God's blessings" he might otherwise give and possibly breaking his commandment to "be fruitful and multiply."

Accordingly, Quiverfull theology opposes the general acceptance among mainline Protestant Christians of deliberately limiting family size or spacing children through birth control. For example, Mary Pride argued, "God commanded that sex be at least potentially fruitful (that is, not deliberately unfruitful). ... All forms of sex that shy away from marital fruitfulness are perverted." Adherents believe that God himself controls via providence how many and how often children are conceived and born, pointing to Bible verses that describe God acting to "open and close the womb" (see Genesis 20:18, 29:31, 30:22; 1 Samuel 1:5-6; Isaiah 66:9). Hess and Hess state that couples "just need to trust God to provide them with the perfect number of children for their situation."

Some Quiverfull adherents base their rejection of birth control upon the belief that the Genesis creation and post–Noahic flood Bible passages to "be fruitful and multiply" (see Genesis 1:22; 9:7) are un-rescinded biblical commandments. For example, Charles D. Provan argues:

"Be fruitful and multiply"... is a command of God, indeed the first command to a married couple. Birth control obviously involves disobedience to this command, for birth control attempts to prevent being fruitful and multiplying. Therefore birth control is wrong, because it involves disobedience to the Word of God. Nowhere is this command done away with in the entire Bible; therefore it still remains valid for us today.

Quiverfull advocates such as Rick and Jan Hess and Rachel Giove Scott believe that the Devil deceives Christian couples into using birth control so that children God otherwise willed to create are prevented from being born. In addition, a Quiverfull adherent was quoted in the 2001 Calgary Herald as making this statement: "Children are made in God's image, and the enemy hates that image, so the more of them he can prevent from being born, the more he likes it."

==== Infertility ====
Adherents view barrenness, referred to as an "empty quiver", as something to be accepted from God as his choice, which then becomes a matter of prayer in the hope that God may decide to miraculously intervene. Quiverfull adherents also see infertility treatments as a usurpation of God's providence and accordingly reject them. Adoption is viewed as a positive option through which couples can also rely on God's providence to send children. Biblical references to God's love for the orphan and the belief that people are saved through adoption into God's family are often noted.

Some circles do accept medical interventions, since improving opportunities for pregnancy is not seen to guarantee it any more than with any healthy couple. Also, some reproductive health problems may be seen as symptomatic of other health problems which need to be addressed generally.

=== Minority doctrine ===
Not all Quiverfull families and authors agree with each statement which was made by the movement's principal authors.

Samuel Owens considers the possibility that some aspects of a fallen universe may sometimes justify the option to use a non–potentially abortive birth control method. These aspects of a fallen universe include serious illnesses, inevitable Caesarean sections, and other problematic situations, such as disabling mental instability and serious marital disharmony. Owens additionally argues that birth control may be permissible for married couples who are called to a "higher moral purpose" than having children, such as caring long-term for many orphans or serving as career missionaries in a dangerous location.

Despite some variances, all Quiverfull families and authors agree that God's normative ideal for happy, healthy and prosperous married couples is to take no voluntary actions that will prevent them from having children.

== Practices ==
=== Non-use of contraception ===
Quiverfull adherents maintain that God "opens and closes the womb" of a woman on a case-by-case basis, and that any attempts to regulate fertility are usurpation of divine power. Thus, the defining practice of a Quiverfull married couple is not to use any form of birth control and to maintain continual "openness to children," that is to say, engaging in routine sexual intercourse with no attempt to limit the possibility of conception. This practice is irrespective of the time of the month during the menstrual cycle, and is considered by Quiverfull adherents to be the principal—if not the primary—aspect of their Christian calling in submission to the lordship of Christ.

Proponents of the Quiverfull movement also regard contraceptive pills and other similar contraceptives as unacceptable abortifacients.

Some Quiverfull adherents advocate for birth spacing through breastfeeding, so that the return of fertility after childbirth could be delayed by lactational amenorrhea.

=== Family organization, homeschooling, homesteading ===
Quiverfull authors and adherents advocate for and seek to model a return to biblical patriarchy. Mary Pride has more recently attempted to distance herself from the patriarchy movement and from a focus on the father's role in training daughters. In a column published in her magazine Practical Homeschooling in 2009, as well as in the afterword to the 25th-anniversary edition of The Way Home, Pride clarified her position that it is primarily mothers, not fathers, who should teach girls about women's roles and duties. As Emily McGowin notes in her 2018 book Quivering Families, however, "[Pride] differentiates herself from these approaches without denying the underlying gender hierarchy and pronatalism."

Quiverfull authors typically organize family governance to reflect an "umbrella of protection" with the mother as a homemaker under the authority of her husband and the children under the authority of both. Parents seek to largely shelter their children from aspects of culture deemed adversarial to their religious beliefs. Additionally, Quiverfull families strongly incline toward homeschooling and toward homesteading in a rural area. However, exceptions exist in substantial enough proportions that these latter two items are general and are often idealized correlations to Quiverfull practices and not integral parts of them.

=== Sterilization reversal surgery ===
Quiverfull adherents Brad and Dawn Irons run Blessed Arrows Sterilization Reversal Ministry. The couple advocates for Quiverfull ideas while providing funding, physician referrals, and support to Christians wishing to undergo sterilization reversal surgery. Institute in Basic Life Principles founder Bill Gothard advocates for reversals, saying that sterilized couples have "cut off children" and should devote themselves instead to "raising up godly seed".

== Criticism ==
The movement has been criticized by journalists from Glamour Magazine for sexism and a demeaning approach to women.

=== Criticism from other Christians ===
James B. Jordan maintains that, while children are indeed blessings, they are only one among a wide range of blessings God offers, and prayerfully choosing foci among them is part of prudent Christian stewardship.

John Piper's Desiring God Ministries has published some comments that relate to Quiverfull:

Just because something is a gift from the Lord does not mean that it is wrong to be a steward of when or whether you will come into possession of it. It is wrong to reason that since A is good and a gift from the Lord, then we must pursue as much of A as possible. God has made this a world in which tradeoffs have to be made and we cannot do everything to the fullest extent. For kingdom purposes, it might be wise not to get married. And for kingdom purposes, it might be wise to regulate the size of one's family and to regulate when the new additions to the family will likely arrive. As Wayne Grudem has said, "it is okay to place less emphasis on some good activities in order to focus on other good activities."

=== Criticism from former Quiverfull adherents ===
Some women who have left the Quiverfull movement are now vocally critical of it. Vyckie Garrison spent 16 years living the Quiverfull lifestyle and had seven children before leaving her husband and ultimately becoming an atheist. She told Vice that her health was negatively affected by so many births and that over time, her husband became "a tyrant." Garrison founded the blog No Longer Quivering to share her own story and the stories of other women who had been harmed by the Quiverfull lifestyle. The blog is now maintained by Suzanne Titkemeyer, another former Quiverfull adherent who describes her years in the movement as "disastrous."

Likewise, some children who were raised in Quiverfull homes have grown up to speak out against the movement. In 2018, Eve [Hännah] Ettinger and Kieryn Darkwater started a podcast called Kitchen Table Cult in which they discuss their experiences of being raised Quiverfull and connect the ideology to events such as the election of Donald Trump. In a 2015 interview about their upbringing, Ettinger said that in Quiverfull families, "the parents are just as confused as the kids, and often are struggling with deep-set psychological issues and need as much therapy and compassion as the kids do to recover from the dehumanizing reality of trying to have a perfect Quiverfull family to please a demanding and holy God."

CFCtoo, an advocacy group for survivors of the Quiverfull community Christian Fellowship Center, is advocating for New York to amend their mandated reporting laws to include clergy. CFCtoo argues that such laws are necessary to combat the Quiverfull movement's propensity for "incest, child sexual abuse, and systematic abuse coverups based on a twisted understanding of biblical forgiveness."

== Notable adherents ==
- Doug Phillips, a Calvinist Christian and the son of U.S. Constitution Party leader Howard Phillips. From 1998 to 2013, Doug Phillips was the president of Vision Forum Ministries, a now-defunct organization which advocated biblical patriarchy, creationism, homeschooling, and Quiverfull. Phillips and his wife, Beall, have seven children.
- Charles D. Provan, whose book The Bible and Birth Control is routinely cited by Quiverfull adherents as providing an important theological justification for their movement. Provan was mentioned in a November 27, 2006, article about Quiverfull in The Nation. He also authored books and articles on other Christian topics. Before Provan's death in 2007, he and his wife had 10 children.
- R. C. Sproul, Jr., a Calvinist Christian theologian and the son of the noted Reformed theologian and founder of Ligonier Ministries, Robert Charles Sproul. Sproul Jr. and his wife, Denise, had eight children before Denise died.
- Nancy Campbell, author, speaker, and mother of 10 children. Nancy and her husband Colin run Above Rubies, "a ministry to encourage women in their high calling as wives, mothers, and homemakers. Its purpose is to uphold and strengthen family life and to raise the standard of God's truth in the nation." Campbell's magazine has a worldwide circulation of over 160,000, and began its publication in 1977. Nancy, Colin, and their children have faced allegations of exploiting Liberian orphans and covering up sexual abuse allegations against Michael Tait of the Newsboys.
- Jim Bob and Michelle Duggar, known for the reality TV show 19 Kids and Counting.

== See also ==
- Christian views on contraception
- Natalism
- Traducianism
- Turpin case
