= Doug Phillips (speaker) =

American writer and attorney (born 1965)

- Born: Douglas Winston Phillips
- Occupations: President of Vision Forum, writer, attorney, videographer
- Spouse: Beall Phillips
- Children: 8

Douglas Winston Phillips (born 1965) is an American Christian author, speaker, attorney, and homeschooling advocate who was once president of the now-defunct Vision Forum Ministries until he resigned due to an inappropriate relationship and allegations of sexual abuse. He advocates biblical patriarchy, young Earth creationism, homeschooling, the Quiverfull movement, and the family integrated church.

== Early life and education ==
Phillips was born into a Christian family with Jewish heritage. His father was Constitution Party founder Howard Phillips and his mother was Margaret "Peggy" Phillips (née Blanchard).

== Career ==
He also worked for six years as a lawyer for the Home School Legal Defense Association (HSLDA).

Phillips is the founder of the defunct San Antonio Independent Christian Film Festival. Phillips produced a documentary The League of Grateful Sons in 2004 about the soldiers who fought in the Battle of Iwo Jima. In 2009, Phillips led "a team of scientists and investigators, including John D. Morris, president of the Institute for Creation Research" to the Galápagos Islands for the 200th anniversary of Charles Darwin's life, and produced a documentary entitled The Mysterious Islands.

=== Criticism ===
Phillips' teachings have been criticized as promoting a biblical worldview that is considered by some to be oppressive to women and girls. In 2014, Michael Farris, the chairman and cofounder of the Home School Legal Defense Association, criticized the biblical patriarchy beliefs of his former HSLDA colleague Doug Phillips, and said he regrets not speaking out against him sooner. He said,

He was teaching that girls should never go to college. …I started a college where half the student body is female and PHC just elected a woman student as the president of the student body. He was teaching that girls should basically stay in their father's home until marriage. I sent my oldest daughter off to Cedarville University and my second daughter off to Romania as a missionary. I thought my actions would speak louder than his words. I wish I had used words too.

=== Allegations and resignation ===
Phillips resigned as president of Vision Forum on October 30, 2013, after acknowledging a "lengthy… relationship with a woman" which was "inappropriately affectionate and romantic." On November 11, 2013, Vision Forum Ministries' board of directors discontinued operations citing "serious sins" which prompted Phillips' resignation. According to The Christian Post, Vision Forum, Inc., Phillips' for-profit business, "appeared to have a liquidation sale" in December 2013.

On April 15, 2014, the Phillips family's ex-nanny filed a lawsuit against Phillips and Vision Forum, alleging that she had suffered years of sexual abuse at the hands of Doug Phillips. Phillips denied the abuse charges, according to Julie Ingersoll, "calling them sensationalist and suggesting that they are motivated by a desire for financial gain."

On November 17, 2014, Phillips was excommunicated from Boerne Christian Assembly, the church that he founded. Phillips had left the church in July.

== Personal life ==
Phillips and his wife Beall met at college, where Doug Phillips ran a Christian newspaper and Beall ran a ministry to unwed mothers called Alternatives to Abortion. Beall Phillips was herself adopted. Together, Doug and Beall Phillips have eight children: Joshua, Justice, Liberty, Jubilee, Faith Evangeline, Honor, Providence and Virginia.

== Books ==
Phillips has written or edited the following books, published by his own company Vision Forum:

- The Bible Lessons of John Quincy Adams for His Son. Vision Forum. 2000. ISBN 978-1-929241-22-4.
- The Letters and Lessons of Teddy Roosevelt for His Sons. Vision Forum. 2001. ISBN 978-1-929241-32-3.
- Robert Lewis Dabney: The Prophet Speaks. Vision Forum. 2003. ISBN 978-1-929241-41-5.
- Poems for Patriarchs. Vision Forum. 2003. ISBN 978-1-929241-45-3.
- The Birkenhead Drill. Vision Forum. 2004. ISBN 978-1-929241-46-0.
- The Little Boy Down the Road: Short Stories & Essays on the Beauty of Family Life. Vision Forum. 2008. ISBN 978-1-934554-34-0.
