= Family integrated church =

Church

In Christianity, a family integrated church is one in which parents and children ordinarily attend church services together; during the service of worship, children and youth stay all through church services and do not attend children's and youth ministries during this time (though after or before the integrated service of worship, church members often attend Sunday School catered to various age groups). Other terms used are family discipleship churches, family-centered ministry and inclusive-congregational ministry.

A spectrum of such churches exists, where some eliminate all age-segregation and others allow for some in certain contexts. Although segregation may take place during weekday events, family-integrated churches are generally united in having children in the main worship service on the Lord's Day. Churches who uphold the model of the family integrated church opine that children and youth who sit with their families during worship develop a love for the liturgy, including the preaching and sacraments, which they will carry with them throughout their lives. Family ministry scholar Timothy Paul Jones notes that in the family-integrated ministry model, "all age-graded classes and events are eliminated." Family integrated churches emphasise inter-generational ministry and the "parents' responsibility to evangelize and disciple their own children." Some advocates base this on the idea that families are the "God-ordained building blocks of the church."

== Adherents ==
Family-integrated churches can be found within many Christian denominations. Some denominations or associations, such as the Primitive Baptists and the Covenant Presbyterian Church, along with some branches of the Churches of Christ which oppose age-graded classes, require family-integration of their churches. It is normative in Catholic and Lutheran churches for families to sit together during the offering of the Mass.

There are also parachurch organizations that work to promote family-integration and unite family-integrated churches, most notably The National Center for Family Integrated Churches (NCFIC). In September 2001, Vision Forum and the NCFIC hosted a "Summit on Uniting Church and Home" in San Antonio, Texas. The Summit discussed the "glaring dichotomy [that] still exists in those churches which practice unbiblical family-segregating, and teen-culture driven philosophies of church life." NCFIC is a parachurch organization, founded with the mission of promoting the sufficiency of scripture for church and family life and restoring family-integrated worship. The center works toward this goal by hosting conferences and connecting family-integrated churches around the world with their church directory which lists around 800 affiliated churches. Although they have a confession of faith that listed churches are required to agree with, affiliation with the NCFIC does not necessitate full agreement with the organization, only "substantial agreement." Furthermore, aside from their unity on family-integration, churches may vary widely in beliefs and adherents may vary greatly on issues regarding the practice of their faith.

== Arguments for family integration ==
In 2009, B&H Academic published Perspectives on Family Ministry: Three Views (ISBN 0805448454) which included a contribution by Paul Renfro in favour of "Family-Integrated Ministry." Renfro argues that in the Old Testament, children were part of the "gathered assembly of God's people" (Deuteronomy 31:12), while "in first-century churches the presence of children in the church assembly was assumed," since Paul directly addressed children in Ephesians 6:1–3. Scott Brown, a pastor and the director of the National Center of Family Integrated Churches, argues for family integrated churches on the basis of the sufficiency of Scripture, while advocates of the concept also argue that this is the practice of historic Christianity. Ben Winslett, a Primitive Baptist and part of a church that requires family-integration, believes that family integrated worship builds family and better protects children from predators in the church, stating, "So, what's my point? My point is that Christ's way is superior. It naturally removes the risk of incidents such as this. It builds stronger families and maintains a safer environment."

== Criticism of family integration ==
Andreas Köstenberger has stated that the movement elevates "the family to an unduly high status that is unwarranted in light of the biblical teaching on the subject". In his book God, Marriage, and Family: Rebuilding the Biblical Foundation, he concludes that churches should devise ways to disciple members, including young people, by instructing them in peer group settings, stating "using a peer group structure does not necessarily mean that the natural family structure is subverted but may helpfully complement and supplement it." R. C. Sproul Jr., himself an elder at a family-integrated church, commented in a July 2011 blog post that the family integrated church movement has "distorted priorities" and that some "would rather be in a family-integrated Mormon ‘church’ than a divided evangelical church." Presbyterian pastor Shawn Mathis argued that the movement's rejection of age-segregation was biblically unfounded and contrary to historical facts. A chapter by Timothy Paul Jones in the book Navigating Student Ministry argued that proponents of family-integrated ministry are historically in error when they claim that minister-led classes for children are a recent innovation that arose for pragmatic reasons; such classes existed for the purpose of catechetical instruction at least as early as the churches overseen by John Calvin in the city of Geneva.

John B. Carpenter, noted eight objections to the family integrated church movement:

1. The sufficiency of scripture: that scripture doesn't explicitly teach it;
2. Divisiveness: noted by Mathis above;
3. Contradicts Scripture: that Titus 2 recommends just the sorts of age segregation the FIC condemns;
4. Undermines the Authority of the Offices in the church: that pastors are called to teach in churches, not fathers;
5. The FIC Misreads Church History: that there have been age-segregated movements from the early days of church history;
6. The FIC is a Cure for a Disease that's Not Prevalent: that what it objects to isn't a widespread problem;
7. A wrong definition of the Church: that the church consists of individual believers, not family units; and
8. Familism: that it appears to make the family the ultimate loyalty.
