= San Antonio Independent Christian Film Festival =

Former Christian film festival

- Closing film: December 2013
- Location: San Antonio, Texas
- Founded: 2004
- Directors: Douglas Phillips
- Hosted by: Vision Forum Ministries

San Antonio Independent Christian Film Festival (SAICFF) was a film festival located in San Antonio, Texas. It was founded and organized by Doug Phillips. The Best of Festival or Jubilee Award carried a $101,000 cash prize. The festival was closed in December 2013 due to Vision Forum Ministries shutting down.

== 2007 competition ==
The winner of the Best of Festival Award was The Monstrous Regiment of Women, an antifeminist documentary by the Gunn brothers, who in 2005 won "Best Documentary" for their film Shaky Town. Samaritan won the best narrative. A Cry from Iran took the Best Documentary Award. Best Biblical Family Award went to Joel's Journey. Heartstrings, directed by John Moore won both the Young Filmmaker's Award and the Audience Choice Award.

== 2009 competition ==
There was no festival in 2008. The 2009 festival had 2,400 attendees and a record 250 entries. The 2009 $101,000 "Best of the Festival" award went to The Widow's Might, the story of a community coming to the rescue of a widow about to lose her home. Nineteen-year-old John Moore wrote and directed the film. Fireproof, which made the highest grossing independent film in 2008, won the "Best Feature Film" category, and a documentary on the Terri Schiavo case won Best Documentary. The festival was held on January 8–10. "Collection of Fortunate Events" won "Audience choice" award. Written and Directed by Ridge Mallery

== 2010 competition ==
The winner of the 2010 festival was Agenda: Grinding America Down, a documentary alleging hidden Socialism in the United States.

== 2012 competition ==
There was no festival in 2011, due not to a festival cancelation, but simply because the festival dates were moved from fall to winter, resulting in no festival occurring within the 2011 calendar year. The "Best of the Festival" award for 2012 was Courageous, a drama from the creators of Fireproof.

Crying Wolf: Exposing the Wolf Reintroduction to Yellowstone National Park, created by independent film producer J.D. King, and his brother, Cody King, won "Best Creation" at the 2012 festival. The controversial 55-minute film focuses on issues surrounding wolves and the concerns of ranchers for the wolf's reintroduction into the American northwest.

== 2013 competition ==
The winner of the 2013 festival was "The Drop Box".

== Cancellation ==
In October 2013, it was announced that the 2014 SAICFF was canceled for a variety of reasons, including its financial losses the previous year. In November 2013, the SAICFF website announced that the festival was shut down "due to the closing of Vision Forum Ministries" after founder Doug Phillips admitted to an inappropriate extramarital relationship.
