= Charles D. Provan =

Charles D. Provan

Charles D. Provan (February 26, 1955 – December 11, 2007) was a Christian theologian, one-time Holocaust denier, and author based in Monongahela, Pennsylvania, who later in life rejected Holocaust denial after his investigations led him to conclude that eyewitness accounts of the Holocaust were believable. He attended Bob Jones University for a few years and then transferred to the University of Pittsburgh to study history, although he never graduated. Provan was a manager of Zimmer Printing of Monongahela, Pennsylvania. Married and the father of 10 children, he died of natural causes on December 11, 2007, at the age of 52.

On the subject of World War II history, Provan came to shock Holocaust deniers by proving that their assumptions were misleading.

As a Christian theologian, Provan was an advocate of a strict constructionist stance on contraception. His book The Bible and Birth Control is regarded as providing theological justification for adherents within the Quiverfull movement.

In 2007 Provan wrote a series of studies of allegories in the Bible, premised on his theory of "conditional prophecy." These articles were published in Christian News, edited by Herman Otten. Provan expressed other controversial exegetical views in Christian News, including the idea that two books of the Old Testament: The Song of Solomon and Ecclesiastes were warnings concerning both the late-life degeneracy of King Solomon and thinking and behavior about which believers should not engage.

Provan's titles include:

- The Bible and Birth Control,
- No Holes? No Holocaust?
- The Church Is Israel Now
