= Reformed Presbyterian Church General Assembly =

Presbyterian church body and denomination in the US

- Abbreviation: RPCGA
- Type: Western Christian
- Classification: Protestant
- Orientation: Reformed
- Polity: Presbyterian
- Origin: 1991
- Separated from: Reformed Presbyterian Church in the United States
- Separations: Covenant Presbyterian Church
- Congregations: 12
- Official website: https://www.rpcga.org

The Reformed Presbyterian Church General Assembly (RPCGA) is a Presbyterian church body and conservative denomination in the United States established in 1991. The RPCGA was founded by members of the Reformed Presbyterian Church in the United States.

== History ==
=== Background ===
The first American presbytery was formed in Philadelphia in 1706. In 1716 it became the Synod of Philadelphia (Synod of the Trinity). In 1729, the Synod of Philadelphia adopted the Westminster Confession and the Larger and Shorter catechisms as its confession of faith. In 1788, the Synod adopted the official name of the "Presbyterian Church in the United States of America" and held its first meeting in 1789. In 1857, the New School movement became divided over the issue of slavery and formed the United Synod of the Presbyterian Church. In 1861, the Old School movement of the South withdrew from the national church and formed the General Assembly of the Presbyterian Church in the Confederate States of America, a continuing church of the former body. Near the end of the American Civil War, the Presbyterian Church in the Confederate States of America and a few smaller synods formed the Presbyterian Church in the United States. In 1972, a conservative movement removed itself from the Presbyterian Church in the United States to form the Presbyterian Church in America. In 1982, the Reformed Presbyterian Church, Evangelical Synod merged with the Presbyterian Church in America.

=== Establishment ===
In 1983, a few churches in the North Georgia Presbytery of the Presbyterian Church in America withdrew from the denomination over purity of doctrine and ecclesiastical practices, calling themselves Covenant Presbytery. In 1985, Covenant Presbytery formed the Reformed Presbyterian Church in the United States as a continuing church. In 1990, the Reformed Presbyterian Church divided into four presbyteries and changed its name to the Reformed Presbyterian Church in the Americas.

The following year three of the four presbyteries chose to depart, citing the Reformed Presbyterian Church in America's failure to establish and maintain a system of church discipline and inability to finalize on a constitution.

After the departure, the Western Presbytery dissolved itself with several churches electing to join with the Westminster Presbytery. One member church left the Hanover Presbytery (which chose to stand alone to this day) and also joined the Westminster Presbytery. During this time, the Westminster Presbytery sought counsel with representatives of several other denominations, some of whom requested that the presbytery join with their denomination.

Its first general assembly adopted the Book of Church Order utilizing large parts of the original from the Westminster Assembly. Boundaries for four presbyteries were laid out, with churches established in each.

== Theology ==
The RPCGA is a conservative Protestant Christian body and continuing church. It is also confessional. The church upholds the teaching of Sola scriptura, receiving it as the inspired and inerrant Word of God. A literal interpretation of the Bible is followed and clearly demonstrated in its stances on creationism, homosexuality and same-sex marriage, feminism, and liberalism. It forbids the "teaching or practice" of charismaticism, dispensationalism, Arminianism, altar calls, abortion, homosexuality, neo-orthodoxy, modernism, humanism, feminism, evolution, Roman Catholicism, and liberalism. It holds to Young Earth creationism. In addition to the Bible the RPCGA adopts the Book of Church Order containing the Westminster Confession and Larger and Shorter catechisms as its subordinate standards.

The church's teachings forbid women in church office and rejects compulsory military service for women.

== See also ==
- Calvinism
- Christian fundamentalism
- Presbyterianism
