= The Widow's Might =

- Directed by: John Robert Moore
- Written by: John Robert Moore
- Produced by: David Heustis; John Moore; Jeff Moreland
- Starring: Angela Coates; John Robert Moore; Cameron Heidrick; Gator Moore
- Cinematography: James Burgess
- Edited by: Rob Tull
- Release date: April 13, 2009
- Running time: 101 Minutes
- Country: United States
- Language: English
- Budget: $130,000

The Widow's Might is a 2009 American independent Christian film directed by John Robert Moore and starring Angela Coates, John Robert Moore, Cameron Heidrick, and Gator Moore. It is set in modern-day Texas and the Old West. It has been praised as "a groundbreaking film, even though it is a first feature film from a teenaged director." The film won the Audience Choice Award and the $101,000 Best of Festival award in the San Antonio Independent Christian Film Festival.

== Premise ==
The film, a musical comedy, tells the story of an elderly widow battling the government to save her home from tax foreclosure, and of the families who help her.

== Awards ==
The film won the Audience Choice Award and the $101,000 Best of Festival award in the San Antonio Independent Christian Film Festival, beating films such as Fireproof and Expelled: No Intelligence Allowed.

== Theatrical release and reception ==
In April, 2009, the film opened to play for one week in 94 U.S. cities across the Midwest and South.

Alex and Brett Harris, in their book Start Here: Doing Hard Things Right Where You Are, discuss the film as a successful example of a challenging project carried out by teenagers.
