= Reformed Presbyterian Church in the United States =

Former protestant denomination

- Classification: Protestant
- Orientation: Presbyterian
- Theology: Christian reconstructionist
- Founder: Rev. Joe Morecraft
- Origin: 1983; Chalcedon Presbyterian Church, north Atlanta, Georgia
- Separated from: Presbyterian Church in America
- Separations: Reformed Presbyterian Church – Hanover Presbytery and Reformed Presbyterian Church General Assembly, 1991
- Merged into: Vanguard Presbytery (2020)
- Congregations: 3 (in 2020)
- Official website: http://www.rpcus.com

The Reformed Presbyterian Church in the United States was a small Presbyterian denomination based in the United States that merged into the Vanguard Presbytery. The RPCUS was established in 1983, subscribed to the unrevised Westminster Confession, and upheld biblical inerrancy. The denomination self-identified as theonomic. It dissolved in 2020.

== History ==
The RPCUS began when Chalcedon Presbyterian Church in north Atlanta, Georgia left the Presbyterian Church in America in 1983. Chalcedon had set requirements that its elders adhere to both theonomy and postmillennialism; however, groups within the PCA's North Georgia Presbytery complained that the church was being too strict in its requirements and that it was "going beyond the Westminster Confession." While the complaint was dismissed, Chalcedon sought to become secure in its position. They inquired into the Orthodox Presbyterian Church, but found that they had not yet settled on how to handle theonomy, so they formed their own denomination. Chalcedon had begun only nine years earlier under the leadership of Joe Morecraft. After Morecraft ran for Congress in Georgia' s 7th District in 1986, losing in the general election to incumbent Democrat George Darden, the denomination saw some growth in the Atlanta area. The church was joined in 1987 by Covenant Presbyterian Church, which grew out of a Reformed Bible study group held in Buford, Georgia. The study group had been partially under the headship of the Rev. Wayne Rogers; however, it would soon be led by Rev. Christopher B. Strevel. The denomination eventually had four presbyteries: Covenant Presbytery (based in Atlanta), Hanover Presbytery, Western Presbytery, and Westminster Presbytery. One church split from the RPCUS in 1990 over concerns of the regulative principle of worship—believing only psalms were acceptable in worship. The next year, Western and Westminster Presbyteries chose to depart and merge, forming the Reformed Presbyterian Church General Assembly and the Hanover Presbytery also left on its own to form the Reformed Presbyterian Church – Hanover Presbytery. The split was due, in part, to the RPCUS's failure to establish and maintain a system of church discipline and inability to finalize on a constitution. Only Covenant Presbytery remained; however, it would continue to grow, particularly in the Southern US. By 2003, the presbytery had 6 churches and 2 mission churches.

Morecraft, the denomination's founder, remained pastor of Chalcedon from 1974 until 2015. In 2015, Morecraft transferred his membership to Reformed Presbyterian Church – Hanover Presbytery as the result of judicial processes against him within the denomination. He immediately founded Heritage Presbyterian Church affiliated with that denomination, also located in Cumming, Georgia. Assistant Pastor Tim Price succeeded Morecraft as the Senior Pastor at Chalcedon, before leaving in January 2020.

Before Morecraft's departure in 2015, the denomination had 8 churches, 1 domestic mission church, and 1 foreign mission. At the beginning of 2020, only 3 churches remained: Chalcedon in Cumming, Georgia, Zion in Macon, Georgia with Pastor Jess Stanfield, and Trinity in Tazewell, Virginia with Pastor Henry Johnson. Shortly after, only Chalcedon and Trinity would remain with Stanfield becoming pastor at Chalcedon. In 2020, the RPCUS finally dissolved when the remaining 2 churches joined the Vanguard Presbytery. In May 2022, the former RPCUS churches left the Vanguard Presbytery to form another new denomination: the Christ Reformed Presbyterian Church.

=== Christ College and Christ Theological Seminary ===
The RPCUS was involved in the creation of Christ College in Lynchburg, Virginia in 1990, which was located at the former Jones Memorial Library. Chalcedon Presbyterian Church in Cumming hosted the Atlanta Metro campus. The college hosted the Patrick Henry Institute, a Christian public policy think tank which sought "to apply biblical socio-political ethics to contemporary public problems and issues" using the "Biblical Law" approach. The Center for Biblical Law and Economics was housed under the Patrick Henry Institute. During the 2008 Financial Crisis, Christ College closed its Lynchburg campus maintaining only its Atlanta campus. At the same time, the denomination opened Christ Theological Seminary. The college and seminary moved their base to Covenant Presbyterian Church in Buford, Georgia. The courses were taught by RPCUS ministers. The seminary's final term was winter of 2014 with a course module titled "Providence and History" in January.
