= Mary Pride =

American writer

- Born: August 27, 1955 (age 71); New York City, U.S.
- Education: Rensselaer Polytechnic Institute
- Occupations: Author; magazine producer
- Spouse: Bill
- Children: 9

Mary Pride (born 27 August 1955) is an American author and magazine producer on homeschooling and topics from a theologically conservative stance within Christian fundamentalism. She is best known for her women's roles and homeschooling publications, while she has also written on parental rights and the need to shelter children from what she has deemed "corrupting influences" from modern culture. For her role in authoring guides for the homeschooling movement, Pride has been described as "the queen of the home school movement" and as a "homeschooling guru". Stemming from her first book, The Way Home, she is also considered a primary source in the philosophy of the hyper-fundamentalist Christian Quiverfull movement.

== Early life ==
Pride was born in New York City, New York, in 1955. She has stated that she graduated from high school at age 15, after which she entered Rensselaer Polytechnic Institute where she earned a bachelor's degree in electrical engineering in 1974, and a master's degree in computer systems engineering a year later. She married her husband Bill around this time and both soon converted to Evangelical Christianity and then to Christian fundamentalism. Pride has stated that she once considered herself a feminist activist.

Before the first of Pride's nine children were born she had decided to homeschool them. The lack of homeschooling guides she encountered prompted her to begin writing her own.

== Influence ==
According to Kathryn Joyce, Pride's 1985 book The Way Home "did much to recreate the homeschooling movement along patriarchal and militantly fertile lines." Fundamentalist Christians have often been broadly influenced by her ideas.

== Books and views ==
=== On women's roles and contraception ===
In Pride's first book, The Way Home: Beyond Feminism, Back to Reality, she chronicled her journey away from what she argued were feminist and anti-natal ideas of happiness, within which she had lived as an activist before her conversion to fundamentalist Christianity in 1977. She described her discovery of happiness surrounding what she felt was the Biblically mandated role of wives and mothers as bearers of children and workers in the home under the authority of a husband. Pride argued that such a lifestyle was Biblically required of married Christian women but that most had been unknowingly duped by feminism. In her book, she sought to counter various versions of Christian feminism that she believed were influenced by varied levels of egalitarianism.

As the basis for her arguments, Pride selected numerous Bible verses from which to lay out what she felt was the Biblical role of women. These included verses she saw as containing her ideas of the importance of childbearing that rejected all forms of contraception. Pride argued that family planning and its mindset was a root cause for inadequate influence in the world by the Christian religion.

Pride asserted that Christian couples should not attempt to limit the number of children they bear or to space them out in any way, arguing that God Himself would be sovereign over family planning:

There is an alternative to scheming and plotting how many babies to have and when to have them. It can be summed up in three little words: trust and obey. If God is willing to plan my family for me (and we Christians all do believe that God loves us and has a wonderful plan for our lives), then why should I muddle up his plan with my ideas? Only God knows the future. Only he knows how much money we will have next year, or when I will reach menopause, or when his Kingdom will desperately need the unique talents of my yet-to-be-conceived son or daughter. Why not leave the driving up to him?

Pride's rejection of every method of family planning in The Way Home was soon noticed by prominent members of the Couple to Couple League, a Catholic natural family planning (NFP) movement. John and Sheila Kippley in their The Art of Natural Family Planning describes how representatives of the organization contacted Pride to express concerns over her position. In 1989, Pride in her HELP for Growing Families periodical published portions of the correspondence between the Kippleys' and herself, during which Pride accepted NFP use only for couples who wished to remain healthy until they were ready to use no fertility control at all. Sheila Kippley credits the correspondence as the reason why Pride accepted NFP in such circumstances in her sequel, All the Way Home.

=== On child abuse and children's rights ===
"The major problem is that the public has been convinced that child abuse is a major problem."

— Mary Pride, The Child Abuse Industry (1986)

In chapter 7 of The Way Home, "Who Owns Our Kids?," Pride wrote that there is never biblical justification for removing a child from homes, even in cases of abuse. She claimed that the true goal of the children's rights movement was to undermine parental rights, not to protect children, and she suggested that Sweden's 1979 outlawing of spanking might result in higher rates of suicide among young people. She also claimed that

Any attempt to control a child at all, from spanking to sending him to Christian school to sending him to his room, is grounds for the state screaming 'Abuse!' and stepping in to take him away. In places where the children's rights people are active, parents have been convicted for ridiculous things like forbidding their children to attend movies.

Pride offered no sources or specific examples for her claims.

Pride has stated that Child Protective Services hotlines in the United States are the equivalent to the KGB in the USSR.

== Criticism ==
Mitchell Stevens, a Hamilton College sociologist, has criticized Pride for exhibiting feminist values in her lifestyle much more than in how she writes and lives. Similarly, Frank Schaeffer, who was the literary agent for Pride's book The Way Home, wrote in 2015 that "the irony was that Pride preached a dogmatic, stay-at-home, follow-your-man philosophy for other women while turning her lucrative home-schooling empire into a one-woman industry."

== Publications ==
=== Books ===
- The Way Home (Crossway Books, 1985)
- The Big Book of Home Learning (Crossway Books, 1986)
- The Next Book of Home Learning (Crossway Books, 1987)
- The New Big Book of Home Learning (Crossway Books, 1988)
- All the Way Home (Crossway Books, 1989)
- The Child Abuse Industry (Crossway Books, 1986)
- Schoolproof (Crossway Books, 1988); (Blackstone Audio Books, 2002)
- Unholy Sacrifices of the New Age and Ancient Empires of the New Age (Crossway Books, 1988, 1989 both with Paul deParrie)
- The "Old Wise Tales" series (Wolgemuth & Hyatt, 1990): Too Many Chickens, The Greenie, The Better Butter Battle, Baby Doe
- The Big Book of Home Learning 4 volumes: Getting Started, Preschool & Elementary, Teen & Adult, Afterschooling (Crossway Books, 1991)
- Pride's Guide to Educational Software with husband Bill Pride (Crossway, 1997)
- The Big Book of Home Learning 3 volumes: Getting Started, Preschool & Elementary, Junior High Through College (Alpha Omega Publications, 1999)
- Mary Pride's Complete Guide to Getting Started in Homeschooling (Harvest House, 2004)

=== Periodicals ===
- HELP For Growing Families
- Practical Homeschooling
- Big Happy Family
- Homeschool PC

== See also ==
- Antifeminism
