= Midwest Christian Outreach =

Non-demoninational evangelical organization

Midwest Christian Outreach, Inc. (MCOI), is a non-denominational, conservative evangelical organization. It is a Chicago support group that encourages people to leave cults or groups they deem cult-like and "an apologetics ministry in suburban Chicago."

It has branches in Lohrville, Iowa; Salisbury, North Carolina; Scranton, Kansas; and Spring Hill, Florida.

Its mission statement: "Midwest Christian Outreach, Inc., is a non-denominational, evangelical organization that exists to defend the Gospel of Jesus Christ, especially to those who consciously reject it due to what MCO deems 'false beliefs', and to challenge and equip believing Christians to do the same".

MCOI is headed by Don Veinot, who is a former atheist, who acts as president. His wife and three others serve as board members of the organization. Religion Dispatches credits Veinot as the founder of MCOI. Founders Ministries credits Veinot and his wife as co-founders of MCOI.

Since 1995, MCOI has produced a self-published journal which is mailed out three to four times a year with a circulation of under 2,000. It is also available online in Adobe PDF format called the Midwest Christian Outreach Journal. The journal consists of three or four articles each issue, with either Don Veinot or his wife writing at least one article each time, and a small group of other like-minded conservatives that are frequent contributors.

Midwest Christian Outreach is based in Wonder Lake, Illinois.
