= Reformed Presbyterian Church – Hanover Presbytery =

Presbyterian churches in the United States

Reformed Presbyterian Church - Hanover Presbytery
- Classification: Protestant
- Theology: Reformed
- Polity: Presbyterian
- Region: United States and Brazil
- Origin: 1991
- Separated from: Reformed Presbyterian Church in the United States
- Congregations: 19 (2022)
- Official website: www.rpchanover.org

The Reformed Presbyterian Church - Hanover Presbytery is a very conservative Protestant, Presbyterian denomination, founded in 1991, with congregations in United States and also in Brazil.

== History ==
The Presbyterian churches originate from the Protestant Reformation of the 16th century. It is the Christian Protestant churches that adhere to Reformed theology and whose ecclesiastical government is characterized by the government of an assembly of elders. Presbyterian government is common in protestant churches that were modeled after the Reformation, notably in Switzerland, Scotland, Netherlands, France and portions of Prussia, of Ireland and, later, of United States.

In 1983, the Reformed Presbyterian Church, Evangelical Synod (RPCES) merged with Presbyterian Church in America (PCA). Since then, a group of churches in the PCA's Georgia Presbytery has objected to the way the merged denomination made its decisions. Therefore, these churches separated from the PCA and formed the Presbytery of the Covenant.

In 1985, this presbytery grew and split into four presbyteries, thus organizing the assembly of the Reformed Presbyterian Church in the United States (RPCES). In 1990, the denomination changed its name to the Reformed Presbyterian Church in the Americas.

In 1991, the four presbyteries of this denomination came into conflict. One of these was Hanover Presbytery, which became a separate denomination, the Reformed Presbyterian Church - Hanover Presbytery.

Since then the denomination has continued to grow and currently has churches in Brazil

=== Attempt to join in 2004 ===
In 2004, the Presbytery of Hanover held a joint meeting with the Covenant Reformed Presbyterian Church, another conservative denomination in United States, aiming at union. However, differing views on the government of the denomination by a higher court and on membership in Freemasonry prevented the union.

== Doctrine and Practice ==
The Reformed Presbyterian Church - Hanover Presbytery believes that the Bible is the inspired and infallible Word of God, subscribes to the Ecumenical Creeds (Apostolic, Nicene Creed, Chalcedonian Creed and Athanasian Creed) and the Westminster Standards (Westminster Confession of Faith, Westminster Larger Catechism, Westminster Shorter Catechism). They uphold a form of church government called “constitutional” Presbyterianism which emphasizes the authority of the local congregation in church discipline and there are no current moderators, boards, commissions or salaried personnel at eldership level or above. Thus, the church approaches the congregational church government system.
