= Michael Barrett (theologian) =

American theologian (born 1949)

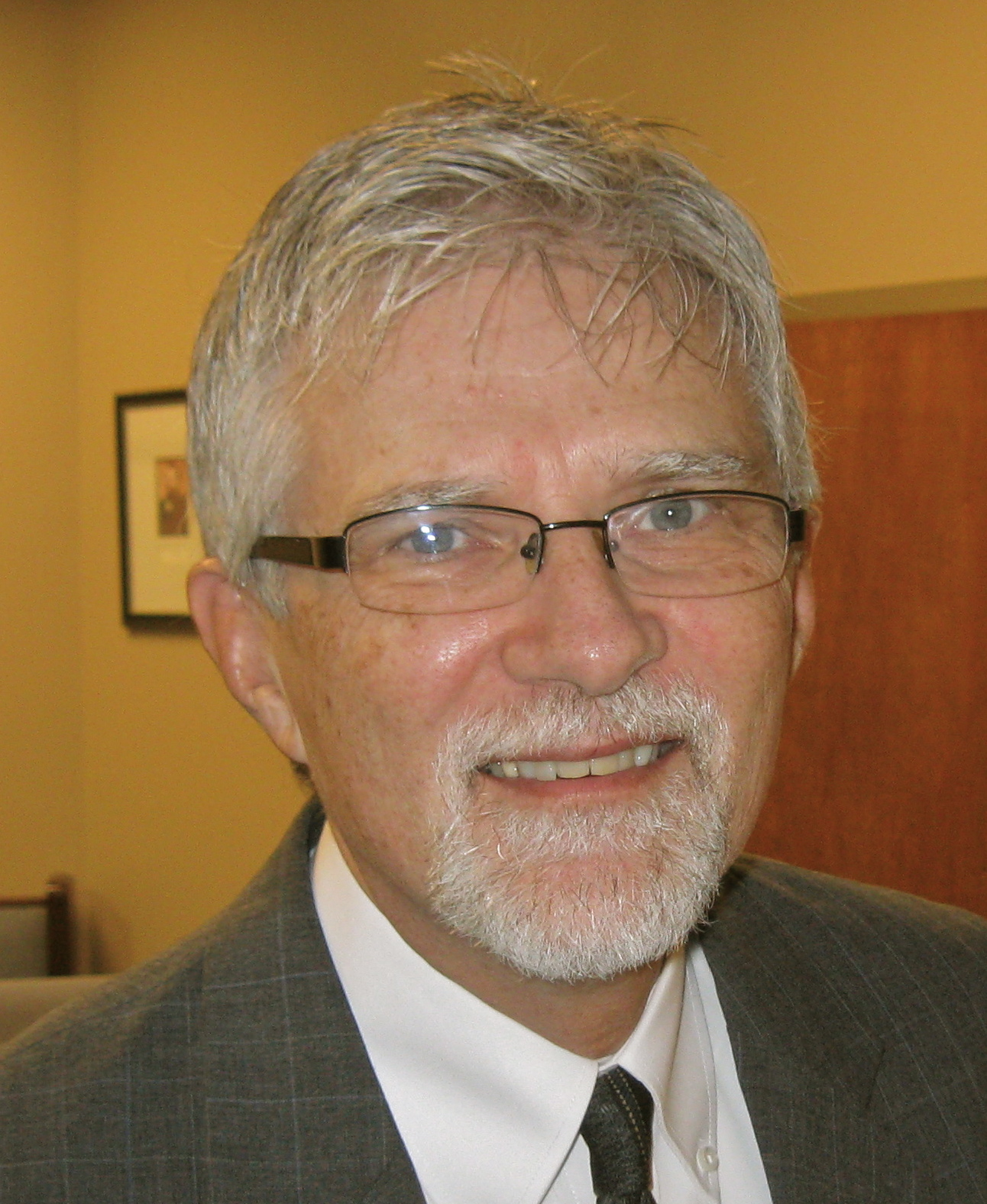
Michael Barrett, 2012

Michael Barrett (born September 18, 1949) is Academic Dean and Professor of Old Testament at Puritan Reformed Theological Seminary, and a former president of Geneva Reformed Seminary.

== Early life and education ==
Born Michael Paul Vernon Barrett on September 18, 1949, Barrett became a Christian as a child. He reports having experienced a "call" to Christian ministry early during college at Bob Jones University. He earned his doctorate in Old Testament Text at BJU with a special focus on Semitic languages. (Note: Barrett's dissertation concerned the translation techniques and philosophies of the Septuagint.)

== Career ==
A former member of the Reformed Presbyterian Church, Evangelical Synod, Barrett helped to establish the Free Presbyterian Church in the United States during the late 1970s and 1980s, and served for many years under Alan Cairns in the Greenville assembly.

Barrett was Professor of Ancient Languages and Old Testament Theology and Interpretation at BJU for almost thirty years. He assumed the presidency of Geneva Reformed Seminary in the fall of 2000. In 2009, regarding this role, he emphasized his conviction that the seminary connect "head and heart—the intellect and devotion" and that it have an "unapologetic and uncompromising commitment to a Reformed theology that is Christ-centered, biblical, evangelistic, and separatist." (Note: In that article, he further stated, "Knowledge without zeal is always dangerous; zeal without knowledge is potentially destructive." See GenevaReformed.org, op. cit.)

As of October 2014, Barrett was Academic Dean and Professor of Old Testament at Puritan Reformed Theological Seminary, and a minister in the Free Presbyterian Church of North America. (Note: On April 8, 2012, Barrett presented the reasons for his acceptance of his post in a sermon (at SermonAudio.com).)

As of this date, Barrett continued as Academic Dean and Professor of Old Testament at Puritan Reformed Theological Seminary.

== Affiliations ==
Barrett has been a member of the Evangelical Theological Society.

== Impact and legacy ==
In 2002, the conservative Baptist Bulletin recommended Barrett's Beginning at Moses to counter what it believed to be a common ignorance of Christ's presence in the Old Testament. Of Barrett's Love Divine and Unfailing, Joel Beeke of Puritan Reformed Theological Seminary wrote that it "is a clear, honest, panoramic treatment of the book of Hosea....a masterpiece in expounding God’s loving and gracious covenant [and] a sheer delight to read." R. Albert Mohler, Jr. described the book as "one of the ten books every preacher should read" in 2009.

== Awards and recognition ==
In 2019, a Festschrift entitled, The Old Testament Yesterday and Today: Essays in Honor of Michael P.V. Barrett, was published in his honor, a volume that included contributions from Walter C. Kaiser Jr. and Joel R. Beeke.

== Personal life ==
Barrett and his wife, Sandra, have two sons and five grandchildren. He is an avid hunter.

== Published works ==
Barrett has authored over half a dozen books on biblical and theological subjects, as well as numerous articles in professional journals and popular religious publications. Barrett is author of a half dozen books, as well as numerous articles in professional journals and popular religious publications.

- Beginning at Moses: A Guide to Finding Christ in the Old Testament (Ambassador-Emerald International, 1999).
- Complete in Him: A Guide to Understanding and Enjoying the Gospel (Ambassador-Emerald International, 2000).
- God’s Unfailing Purpose: The Message of Daniel (Ambassador-Emerald International (2003).
- The Beauty of Holiness: A Guide to Biblical Worship (Ambassador-Emerald International, 2006).
- Barrett, Michael P.V. (November 2008). Love Divine and Unfailing: The Gospel According to Hosea. Phillipsburg, NJ: P&R Publishing. ISBN 9781596380752. Archived from the original on 15 July 2011.
- The Hebrew Handbook (BJU Press, 4th ed., 1994).
