= Geoff Thomas (pastor) =

Welsh pastor

Hugh Geoffrey Thomas (born 15 October 1938 in Merthyr Tydfil) is a Welsh pastor. He was the pastor of Alfred Place Baptist Church for fifty years.

Thomas studied at the University College of Cardiff and Westminster Theological Seminary. He is visiting professor of Historical Theology at Puritan Reformed Theological Seminary. Thomas is a Particular Baptist.

In 2013, a Festschrift was prepared in his honour. The Holy Spirit and Reformed Spirituality includes contributions from Carl Trueman, Joel Beeke, and Derek Thomas.

In 2022, his autobiography was released: In The Shadow of the Rock.

Thomas placed a large emphasis in his teaching on keeping the faith and finishing the race. Pastor Ligon Duncan recounted Thomas telling another theologian: "When I was a young man first going in the ministry, I wanted to be someone great. But as I see my heroes falling all around me, all I want to do now is cross the finish line without shaming God’s people and abandoning my Lord. I just want to cross the finish line. That’s what I want to do. I want to finish well."
