= Lindsay Wilson (minister) =

Free Presbyterian clergy, Northern Ireland

Dr. Lindsay Wilson is a GP and minister of Castlederg Free Presbyterian Church in Northern Ireland. On 18 January 2008 he was elected by the Presbytery to succeed Rev. Ron Johnstone as Deputy Moderator of the denomination. He was brought up in Portadown and attended 1st Portadown Presbyterian Church (Edenderry), Bethany Free Presbyterian Church (Portadown) and Tandragee Free Presbyterian Church. He entered the Whitefield College of the Bible and, following completion of the four-year ministerial course, served as Assistant Minister to MP William McCrea in Magherafelt.
