= Free Presbyterian Church of North America =

Presbyterian denomination in the US and Canada

- Classification: Christian
- Orientation: Reformed Protestant
- Polity: Presbyterian
- Region: North America
- Origin: 17 May 2005; Toronto, Ontario, Canada
- Branched from: Free Presbyterian Church of Ulster
- Congregations: 22
- Tertiary institutions: Geneva Reformed Seminary
- Official website: www.fpcna.org

The Free Presbyterian Church of North America (FPCNA) is a Presbyterian denomination in the United States and Canada with mission works in Liberia, Jamaica, Dominican Republic, and Kenya. Originally consisting of North American congregations under the auspices of the fundamentalist Free Presbyterian Church of Ulster, the North American group became a separate denomination in May 2005.

== Origin ==
The churches now comprising the FPCNA were previously part of the Free Presbyterian Church of Ulster, which itself was formed in 1951 in Northern Ireland by the cleric and politician Ian Paisley, who remained the FPCU's moderator until 2008. The North American churches organized as the FPCNA and first elected their own moderator in 2005. In 2020 the denomination consisted of 22 churches in the United States and Canada.

== Beliefs ==
- Fundamental in Doctrine, believing in the divine authority and verbal inspiration of the Bible, and the great fundamental doctrines of grace it contains. The Scriptures alone are the supreme authority in matters of faith and practice. The Free Presbyterian Church uses only the Authorized Version (KJV) of the Bible.
- Evangelical in Outreach, in obedience to the Great Commission of Christ to "go ye into all the world and preach the Gospel". A virile program of Gospel preaching, missionary endeavour and radio ministry is actively pursued with the great objective of leading people of every class, colour and creed to an experiential knowledge of Jesus Christ as Saviour and Lord.
- Sanctified in Behaviour, encouraging its members to lead godly lives in obedience to God’s Word, that will be testimonies of holiness and righteousness, in a world increasingly plagued by lowering moral values.
- Presbyterian in Government, being ruled by elders and deacons chosen from the people, by the people, to serve the people. The Free Presbyterian Church stands for a born-again membership and the ministers, elders, and deacons are men genuinely born-again by the Spirit of God and dedicated to the extension of the Kingdom of Christ.
- Protestant in Conviction, gladly taking its stand alongside the great Christian leaders of the Protestant Reformation. The twin pillars of Protestantism, namely a positive witness for Christ, and a protest against error, are cherished and defended.
- Separatist in Practice, believing and practicing the doctrine of Biblical separatism. In accordance with this, the Free Presbyterian Church has no association with the modern Ecumenical or Charismatic movements, nor will it fellowship with any church which has departed from the fundamental doctrines of the Word of God.

== Worship ==
The Free Presbyterian Church of North America accepts both paedobaptist and credobaptist ministers, not practicing division or exclusion over "the proper mode and subjects of baptism."

The Free Presbyterian Church of North America practices the ordinance of headcovering for women.

== Locations ==
The Free Presbyterian Church has many churches all over North America, including two in South Carolina, Arizona, Pennsylvania, and Toronto, Ontario.

== Let the Bible Speak ==
Let the Bible Speak is the radio ministry of the Free Presbyterian Church, which is heard on approximately 30 stations around the world. LTBS publishes The Quarterly, an informative and devotional magazine written by several Free Presbyterian ministers.

== Geneva Reformed Seminary ==
For many years the Free Presbyterian Church of Ulster operated the Whitefield College of the Bible in Northern Ireland for the training of ministers. In 1982, an extension of this institution commenced in Greenville, South Carolina, under the leadership of Alan Cairns, who assumed most of the instructional duties. This extension was established as a separate institution under the North American Presbytery and renamed Geneva Reformed Seminary. Michael P. V. Barrett was appointed president of the institution in 2001. The seminary has been a fully accredited member of the Association of Reformed Theological Seminaries (ARTS) since 2005.
