= Lindsay Wilson =

Lindsay Wilson may refer to:

- Lindsay Wilson (rower) (born 1948), New Zealand rower
- Lindsay Wilson (soccer) (born 1979), Australian soccer player
- Lindsay Wilson (minister), Presbyterian minister in Northern Ireland
