= Master of Theology =

Master's degree

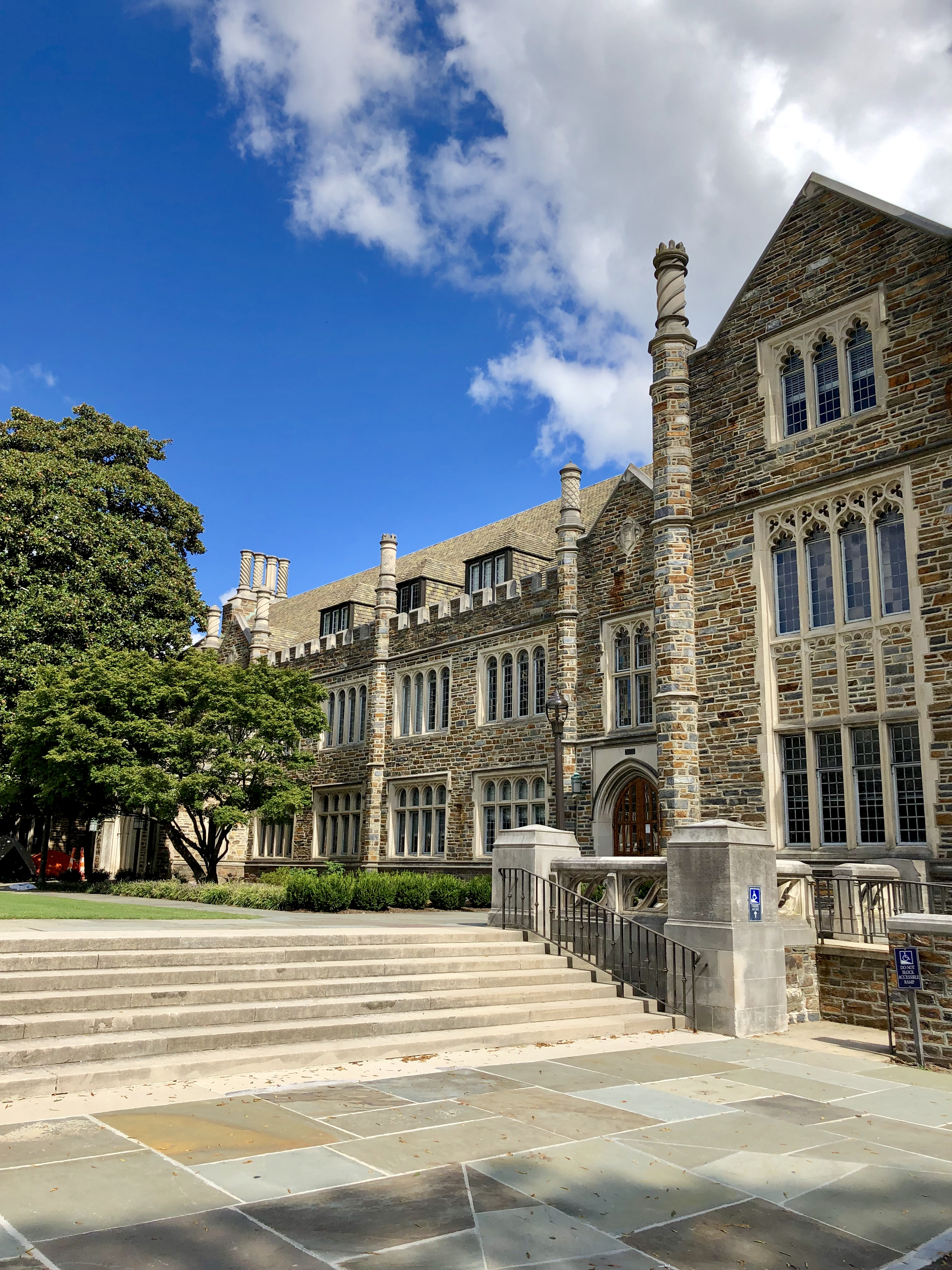
Duke Divinity School is one school awarding the Master of Theology degree.

Master of Theology (Latin: Theologiae Magister, abbreviated ThM, MTh, or MTheol, or Sacrae Theologiae Magister; abbreviated STM) is a post-graduate degree offered by universities and seminaries. It can serve as a transition degree for entrance into a PhD program or as a stand-alone terminal degree depending on one's particular educational background and institution of study. In North America, the ThM typically requires at least three years of prerequisite graduate study for entrance into the program, typically a Master of Divinity or equivalent. An honorary title of STM is also awarded within the Dominican Order.

== Coursework ==
One must normally have a Master of Divinity or Master of Arts degree in a theological field before being admitted to study for the ThM. These degrees are typically awarded after having completed twenty-four hours of study at the master's level beyond that required for the first theological degree. In some programs this degree may be awarded solely on the basis of taught academic courses.

The Master of Theology often includes one or two years of specialized advanced and/or doctoral-level studies in theological research (e.g., counseling, church history, systematic theology) or biblical studies (e.g., New Testament, Old Testament, biblical translation). It may include a comprehensive examination and a research thesis. Guidelines require the program to produce "learning outcomes that demonstrate advanced competency in one area or discipline of theological study and capacity to conduct original research in that area." Owing to the advanced nature of ThM studies, biblical language training is usually an admissions prerequisite and some programs include additional research language training in German, French, Latin, or an ancient Hebrew cognate (e.g., Akkadian, Ugaritic).

== North America ==
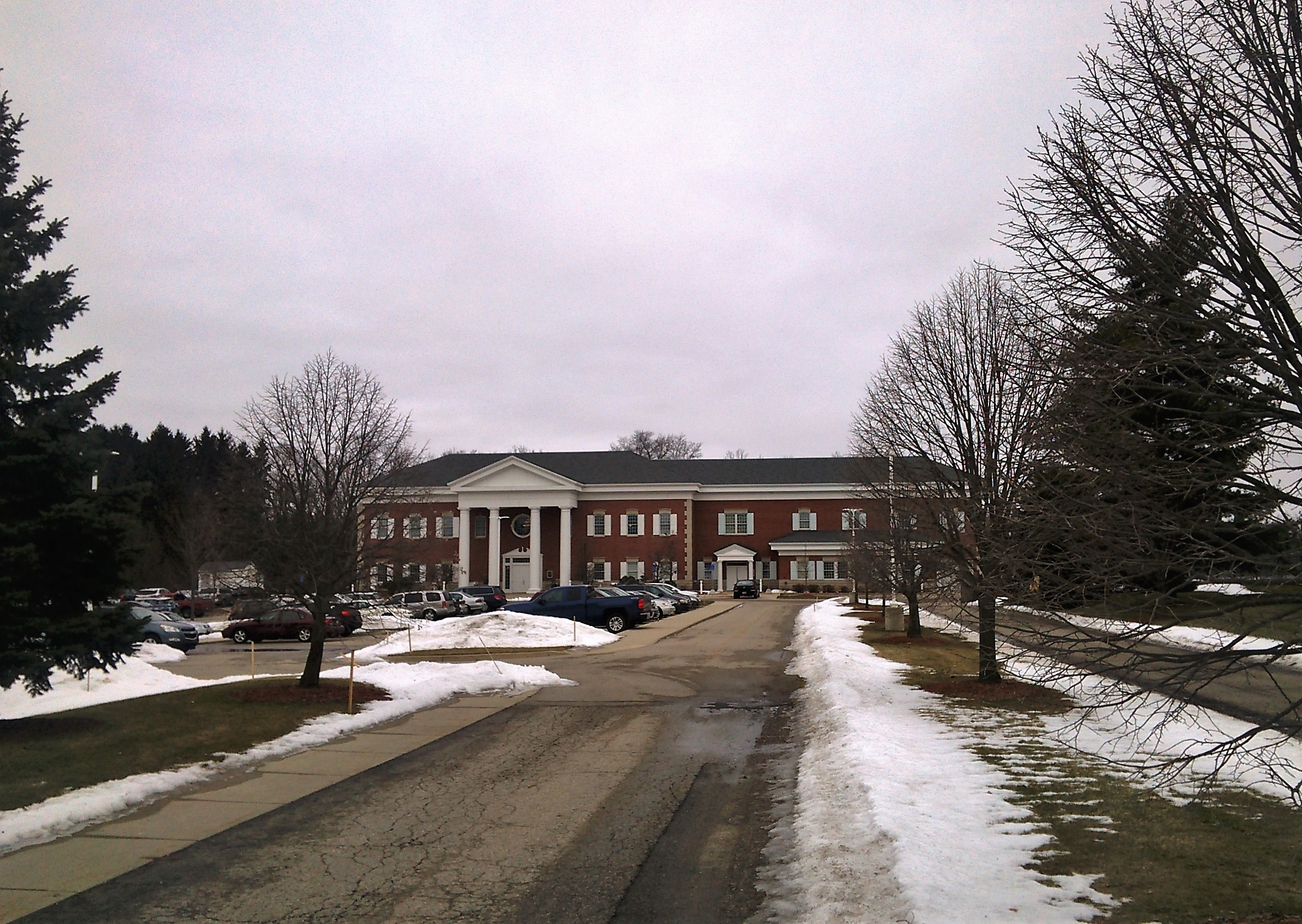
Puritan Reformed Theological Seminary taught the greatest number of ThM students in Academic Year 2024–2025.

In North America, the Association of Theological Schools requires a Master of Theology, or the equivalent Master of Sacred Theology, to be the minimum educational credential for teaching theological subjects in its accredited seminaries and graduate schools. The Association of Theological Schools classifies both degrees as "Advanced Programs Oriented Toward Theological Research and Teaching." Most ThM programs in the US require a Master of Divinity or its educational equivalent as an academic prerequisite. Some seminaries will also credit part of the work done for the ThM towards a student moving on to the Doctor of Philosophy in theology degree once the STM has been awarded.

The Master of Theology often functions as a terminal level degree, dependent upon one's particular educational route or institution of study. Some institutions award a Master of Theology en route to a Doctor of Philosophy or Doctor of Theology.

== International ==
The international MTh degree is generally an entry-level masters degree, roughly equivalent to an American MA, while in the US, the ThM is an advanced or terminal master's degree beyond the MDiv. These may be generally distinguished through the abbreviation MTh for the international degree and ThM for the US iteration. There are some US institutions which offer a MTh that is akin to the international MTh and is the basically the equivalent of an MA or an MTS; however, these typically use the abbreviation MTh.

== Dominican title ==
The Master of Sacred Theology (STM) is also the name given to an honorary title bestowed by the Roman Catholic Order of Preachers (Dominicans) on its most distinguished scholars. Thus it is a "master's degree" in the most ancient sense and thus can be likened to an honorary doctorate conferred only upon Dominicans who are already scholars of theology.

The recipient must be a full-time professor for ten years and have published books and articles of international scholarly repute. The initial nomination is made by the friar's own province (local district) and then must be approved by the intellectual commission of the Generalate in Rome. The final decision is then made, after review, by the Master of this order and his council. The regalia of the STM is a four-finned black biretta today usually trimmed with scarlet, and a ring, which may be set with an amethyst. The STM has the perpetual right to the title "very reverend". The Dominican archbishop of Cincinnati, John T. McNicholas, was famous for refusing to use DD (Doctor of Divinity) after his name; he insisted on using STM because it was the more distinguished academic title. His STD, of course, is a yet more distinguished title than either DD or STM as the STD is an earned degree and not an honorary one.

== See also ==
- Bachelor of Divinity
- Master of Arts (Theology and Religion)
- Master of Divinity
- Doctor of Ministry
- Doctor of Theology
- Licentiate in Sacred Theology
