= Walter Marshall (Puritan) =

Walter Marshall (15 June 1628 – August 1680) was an English, non-conformist Puritan pastor and author best known for his book on the Gospel Mystery of Sanctification.

== Life ==
Walter Marshall became a fellow of New College, Oxford in 1648 and graduated with a Bachelor of Arts degree in 1652. In 1656, he was appointed to the vicarage of Hursley, Hampshire.

When the Act of Uniformity passed in 1662, Marshall joined many of his Puritan colleagues and was ejected from his parish. Soon afterwards, Marshall was installed as minister of an Independent congregation at Gosport, Hampshire, where he served for eighteen years.

For several years, Marshall experienced seasons of spiritual depression. For years, Marshall sought assurance, holiness and peace, consulting contemporaries like Richard Baxter. However, it was not until a life altering conversation with Thomas Goodwin that he began to focus more on Christ's spiritual power in comparison with his own natural power. With this new focus, he found "holiness, peace of conscience, and joy in the Holy Ghost".

== The Gospel Mystery of Sanctification ==
The Gospel Mystery of Sanctification was first published in 1692 after Marshall's death. The book is divided into fourteen sections that Marshall called directions. In the first direction, Marshall asserts that "sanctification, whereby our hearts and lives are conformed to the law, is a grace of God that He communicates to us by means." The means of grace include prayer, the word, sacraments, and the church. Many have alluded to the book's teachings on union with Christ. Direction 5 is titled: We cannot attain holiness by our endeavours in a natural state, without union and fellowship with Christ.

== Quotes ==
- The scope of all is, to teach you how, you may attain to that practice and manner of life which we call holiness, righteousness, or godliness, obedience, true religion; and which God requireth of us in the law particularly in the moral law, summed up in the ten commandments, and more briefly in these two great commandments of love to God and our neighbour (Matthew 22: 37, 39).
  - The Gospel Mystery of Sanctification, Direction 1
- It is evident that we cannot practice true holiness, while we continue in a natural state; because we must be "born of the water and of the Spirit," or else we "cannot enter into the kingdom of God," John 3:3,5; and we are "created in Christ Jesus unto good works, which God hath before ordained that we should walk in them," (Ephesians 2:10).
  - The Gospel Mystery of Sanctification, Direction 5
- Believing on Christ, is a work that will require diligent endeavour and labor for the performance of it. We must labour to enter into that rest; lest any man fall by unbelief" (Hebrews 6:11). We must show "diligence to the full assurance of hope to the end", that we may be "followers of them who through faith and patience inherit the promises" (Hebrews 6:11, 12). It is a work that requireth the exercise of might and power; and therefore we have need "to be strengthened with might by the Spirit in the inner man, that Christ may dwell in our hearts by faith" (Ephesians 3:16, 17).
  - The Gospel Mystery of Sanctification, Direction 11

== Dutch Translation of The Gospel Mystery of Sanctification ==
In 1739 the Dutch minister Alexander Comrie (1706-1774) published a Dutch translation of The Gospel Mystery of Sanctification. The book was published in Leiden in 1739 with the following title in Dutch De verborgentheit van de euangelische heiligmaking. In 1750 Comrie wrote that this book was probably the best what was written about sanctifacation

== Works ==
- The Gospel Mystery of Sanctification/ Includes Marshall's sermon: The doctrine of justification opened and applied by Walter Marshall (1628-1680), Evangelical Press, Welwyn, Hertfordshire, England, 1981, (first published 1692), ISBN 978-0-85234-158-2, 257 pgs
