= Alan Cairns (clergyman) =

Northern Irish pastor, author, and radio Bible teacher (1940–2020)

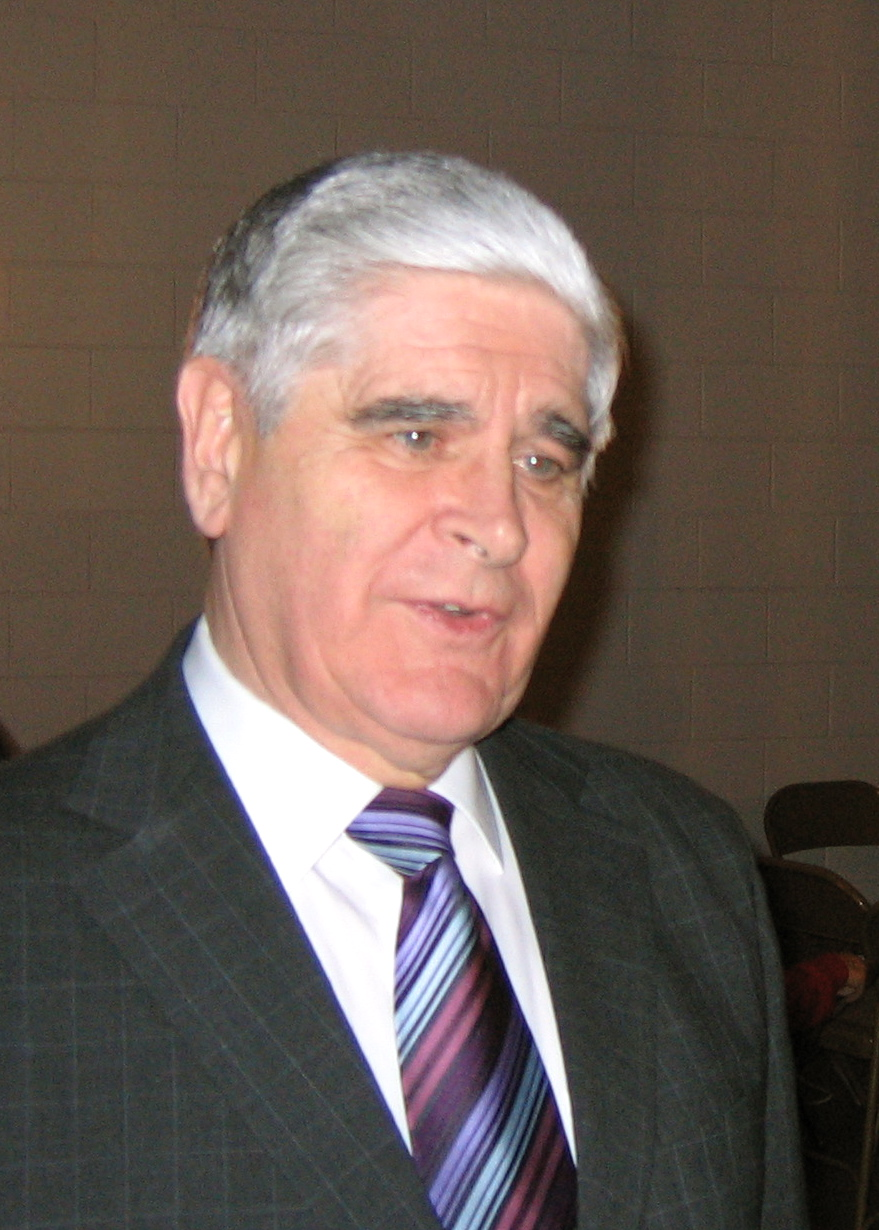
Cairns in 2005

Alan G. Cairns (August 12, 1940 – November 5, 2020) was a Northern Irish pastor, author, and radio Bible teacher.

== Biography ==
Cairns was born on August 12, 1940, in Belfast. He joined the nascent Free Presbyterian Church of Ulster as a teenager. After being called to its ministry, he became a close associate of Ulster preacher-politician Ian Paisley. Cairns served as pastor of Free Presbyterian churches in Dunmurry and then Ballymoney. In 1973, he began a radio ministry, "Let the Bible Speak," which in 2020 was heard on stations in the UK, the Irish Republic, North America, India, Africa, Nepal, Iran and Afghanistan.

In 1980, Cairns accepted a call to pastor Faith Free Presbyterian Church, Greenville, South Carolina, the first church in the United States to associate itself with the Ulster denomination. In Greenville, Cairns founded Geneva Reformed Seminary, which today serves as the seminary for the Free Presbyterian Church of North America.

Cairns adapted and published many of his sermon series as books and wrote a Dictionary of Theological Terms from a Reformed perspective. In 2007, Cairns became pastor emeritus, and in 2009, he retired to Ballymoney, where he died of COVID-19 on November 5, 2020, aged 80.

== Publications ==
- Apostles of Error: An Examination of Liberalism, Neo-Orthodoxy, and Particularly New Evangelicalism (Greenville: Faith Free Presbyterian Church, 1989)
- Throned in Highest Bliss (Belfast: Ambassador Productions, 1990)
- A Prophet with Honour: The Life and Work of John Wylie... (Belfast: Presbytery of the Free Presbyterian Church, 1991)
- Eagle's Wings: Daily Devotional Meditations for a Whole Year, editor (Greenville: Ambassador, 1991)
- A Sure Foundation: Rediscovering the Basic Message of the New Testament (Greenville: Ambassador, 1996)
- Dictionary of Theological Terms, editor (Greenville: Emerald House, 1998)
- Chariots of God: God's Law in Relation to the Cross and the Christian (Belfast: Ambassador, 2000)
- The Fruit of the Spirit (Greenville: Ambassador-Emerald International, 2002)
- The Lord's Prayer (Greenville: Ambassador International, 2004)
