= Geneva Reformed Seminary =

Christian higher education institution

- Former names: Whitefield College of the Bible
- Motto: Separated Unto the Gospel
- Type: Seminary
- Established: 1982
- Affiliations: Free Presbyterian Church of North America
- Location: Greenville, South Carolina, United States; 34°52′3″N 82°19′50″W
- Website: www.grsonline.org

Geneva Reformed Seminary is a small theological school in Greenville, South Carolina, accredited by the Association of Reformed Theological Seminaries and supported by the Free Presbyterian Church of North America. The seminary offers B.D. and M.Div. degrees. Initially called Whitefield College of the Bible after a companion school in Banbridge, Northern Ireland, the seminary was renamed in 2002 to avoid confusion in the United States where Bible schools and seminaries prepare students at different academic levels.

Faith Free Presbyterian Church of Greenville, South Carolina, the first constituted congregation of the Free Presbyterian Church in the United States (1977), had from its inception a vision of becoming the progenitor of other Free Presbyterian churches in North America. In 1982, Alan Cairns, an Ulsterman and the first pastor of the Greenville church, was commissioned by the Free Presbyterian Church to become the first professor of the new theological school, with teachers from Northern Ireland assisting on an adjunct basis. Training was limited to men preparing for the ministry of the Free Presbyterian Church.

Both the Church and its seminary acknowledge the Westminster Confession of Faith and its exposition of Reformed theology, which they believe to be taught by the Bible. Nevertheless, they modify the Westminster Standards by permitting liberty of conscience regarding baptism and eschatology. In an advertising brochure published in 2008, the seminary declared its intent "to avoid the lamentable abuses" of covenant theology by pursuing "a strongly fervent evangelistic mission....[a] biblical, fundamental, separatist, evangelistic, and Reformed ministry."

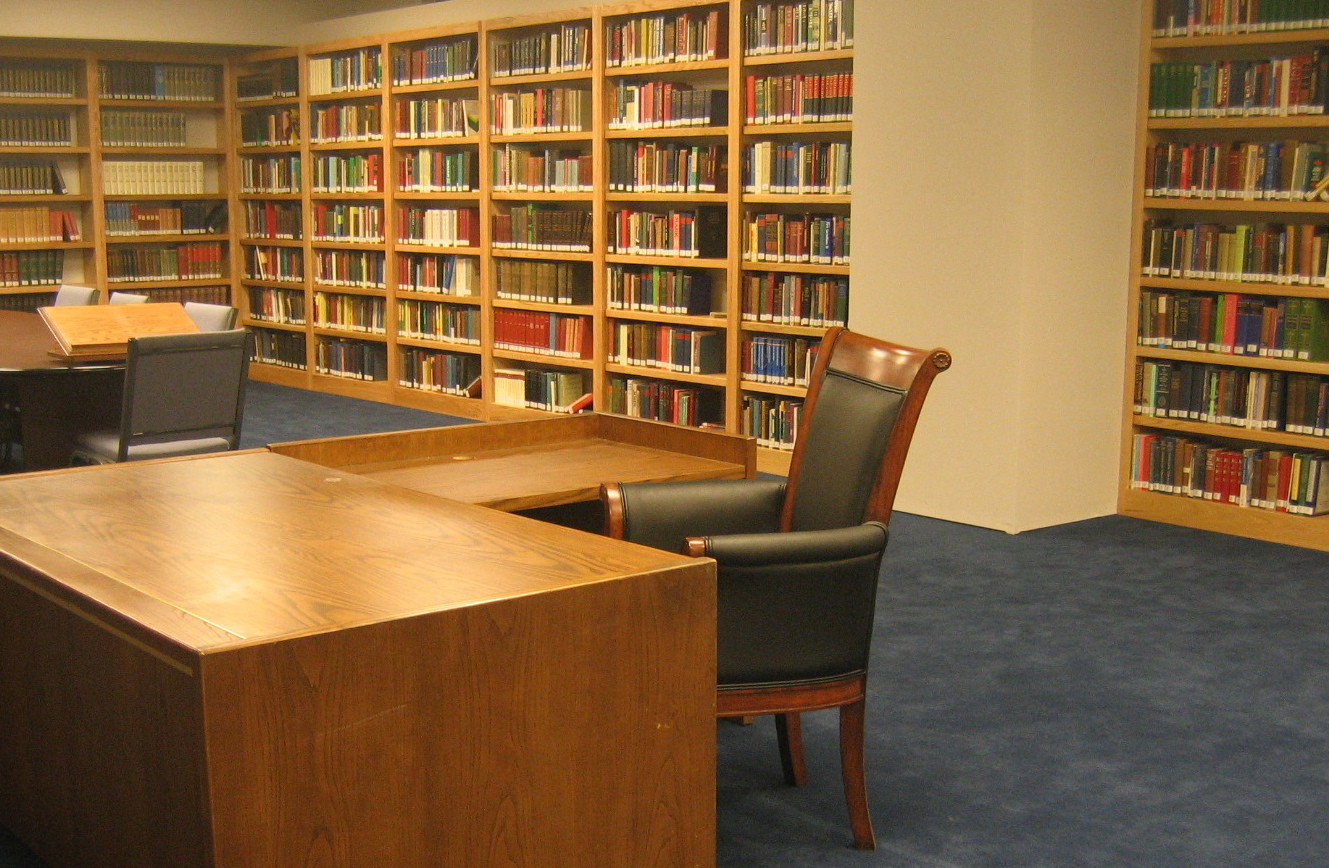
Library, Geneva Reformed Seminary, 2008

Ian Paisley, the former moderator of the Free Presbyterian Church of Ulster, had a long-standing relationship with Bob Jones University, also located in Greenville, and by February 2007, every GRS faculty member was both a graduate of Bob Jones University and a minister or licentiate minister of the Free Presbyterian Church. In 2001 the Presbytery Commission appointed Michael Barrett, who had earned a Ph.D. in theology from BJU, as president. Admission to the seminary was thereafter opened to members of other denominations. In May 2008, the presbytery approved a certificate program for laypersons, some evening classes, and the introduction of online courses, and by the fall of 2010, eighteen courses were available for online credit or audit.

GRS therefore represents a Calvinistic branch of separatist fundamentalism in the United States, in contradistinction to Greenville Presbyterian Theological Seminary, another conservative Presbyterian institution just a few miles away.

== See also ==
- Whitefield College Of The Bible
- Free Presbyterian Church of North America
