= Isaac Chauncy =

English dissenting minister

Isaac Chauncy (1632–1712) was an English dissenting minister.

== Life ==
Chauncy was the eldest son of Charles Chauncy, and was born on 23 August and baptised at Ware, Hertfordshire, on 30 August 1632. He went as a child to New England with his father, and was entered at Harvard University in 1651, where he studied both theology and medicine, but, coming to England, completed his education at Oxford University, where he proceeded M.A. Before 1660 he was given the rectory of Woodborough, Wiltshire, where he resided until ejected by the Act of Uniformity in 1662. Thereupon he removed to Andover, Hampshire, where he took charge of a congregational church. On 5 July 1669 he was admitted an extra-licentiate of the College of Physicians.

'Having,’ says Calamy, 'quitted Andover some time after the recalling of Charles's Indulgence, he came to London with a design to act chiefly as a physician'. On 30 September 1687 he was induced to accept the pastorate of an independent meeting-house in Bury Street, St. Mary Axe, over which he presided for fourteen years. Chauncy, although a learned man, was not a popular preacher, and being somewhat bigoted, he so tormented his hearers with incessant declamations on church government 'that they left him'. He therefore resigned his charge on 15 April 1701, and was succeeded by Isaac Watts, who had been his assistant for two years previously. During the whole period of his ministry he had also practised medicine.

He afterwards became divinity tutor to the newly founded Dissenting Academy in London, an office which he held until his death. Chauncy died at his house in Little Moorfields on 28 February 1712. By his wife, Jane, he had three sons and a daughter.

== Works ==
- Prefatory epistle to Clarkson's 'Primitive Episcopacy,’ 1688
- An edition of Owen's 'Gospel Grounds,’ 1709
- 'The Catholic Hierarchy,’ 1681
- 'A Theological Dialogue, containing a Defence and Justification of Dr. John Owen from the forty-two errors charged upon him by Mr. Richard Baxter,’ 1684
- 'The Second Part of the Theological Dialogue, being a rejoinder to Mr. Richard Baxter,’ 1684
- 'The Unreasonableness of compelling Men to go to the Holy Supper,’ 1684
- 'Ecclesia Enucleata: the Temple opened, or a clear demonstration of the True Gospel Church,’ 1684
- 'The Interest of Churches, or a Scripture Plea for Steadfastness in Gospel Order,’ 1690
- 'Ecclesiasticon, or a plain and familiar Christian Conference concerning Gospel Church and Order,’ 1690
- 'Examen Confectionis Pacificæ, or a Friendly Examination of the Pacific Paper.' [By I. C.], 1692
- 'Neonomianism unmasked; or the Ancient Gospel pleaded against the other, called a New Law, or Gospel, &c.,’ three parts, 1692–3
- 'A Rejoynder to Mr. D. Williams, his reply to the first part of Neonomianism unmaskt, &c.,’ 1693
- 'A Discourse concerning Unction and Washing of Feet, &c.,’ 1697
- 'The Divine Institution of Congregational Churches, Ministry, and Ordinances, &c.,’ 1697
- 'An Essay to the Interpretation of the Angel Gabriel's Prophesy deliver'd by the Prophet Daniel, chap. ix. 24,’ 1699
- 'Christ's Ascension to fill all things … a sermon [on Eph. iv. 10],’ 1699
- 'Alexipharmacon; or a fresh Antidote against Neonomian Bane and Poyson to the Protestant Religion, &c.,’ 1700
- 'The Doctrine which is according to Godliness, &c.' [1700?] (another edition, 1737)

== Translation ==
Alexander Comrie (1706–1774) translated a work of Chauncy The Doctrine, which is According to Godliness in Dutch and gave it the following title De Leer der Waarheid, die naar de godzaligheid is (1757) Comrie agreed with this work, but strongly edited the text according to his own theological views.
