= Heritage Reformed Congregations =

Religious denomination

- Classification: Protestant
- Theology: Reformed
- Polity: Presbyterian
- Associations: North American Presbyterian and Reformed Council and International Conference of Reformed Churches
- Region: United States and Canada
- Origin: 1993
- Separated from: Netherlands Reformed Congregations
- Congregations: 10
- Members: 2,195
- Seminaries: Puritan Reformed Theological Seminary
- Other name: Heritage Netherlands Reformed Congregations
- Publications: The Banner of Sovereign Grace Truth; The Banner of Truth Tract Mission; Glad Tidings; The Gospel Trumpet; Inheritance Publishers
- Official website: heritagereformed.com

The Heritage Reformed Congregations (HRC) is a Reformed denomination in the United States and Canada influenced by the tradition of English Puritanism and the Dutch Nadere Reformatie.

== History ==
The Heritage Reformed Congregations denomination was established in 1993, when the synod of the Netherlands Reformed Congregations deposed the consistory of the First Netherlands Reformed Congregation of Grand Rapids. However, 780 of the one thousand members of the church could not accept the deposition of their pastor, elders, and deacons.

The consistory felt compelled to form a new denomination named the Heritage Netherlands Reformed Congregation (renamed the Heritage Reformed Congregations in 2003), while Joel R. Beeke continued ministering to the church. Eight other churches soon joined the Grand Rapids congregation to form a new denomination, bringing the denominational membership to about two thousand.

In 1995, the denomination founded Puritan Reformed Theological Seminary. Later, the seminary was supported by the Free Reformed Churches of North America.

Starting in the 2010s, the denomination began a dialogue with the Free Reformed Churches of North America about a possible denominational merger. In 2017, the two denominations held simultaneous synods to discuss the proposed merger.

== Doctrine ==
The churches of the Heritage Reformed Congregations subscribe to the Three Forms of Unity (the Heidelberg Catechism, the Belgic Confession of Faith, and the Canons of Dort) and the Westminster Standards (the Westminster Confession of Faith, the Westminster Larger Catechism, and the Westminster Shorter Catechism). The denomination affirms the authority, inspiration, and inerrancy of the Bible and promotes Reformed experiential preaching.

== Interdenominational relations ==
The denomination is a member of the North American Presbyterian and Reformed Council and the International Conference of Reformed Churches.

== Ministries ==
The denomination has five publishing ministries:

- The Banner of Sovereign Grace Truth (the denominational periodical)
- The Banner of Truth Tract Mission (the denominational tract ministry)
- Glad Tidings (the denominational missions periodical)
- The Gospel Trumpet (the denominational sermon periodical)
- Inheritance Publishers (a ministry that republishes sermons in the Reformed tradition from the sixteenth to nineteenth centuries)

== Congregations ==
The Heritage Reformed Congregations consist of ten congregations.

List of Heritage Reformed Congregations
Congregation	Members 2022	Minister(s)
Bradford, Ontario	43	Donald Overbeek
Burgessville, Ontario	380	David Van Brugge
Chilliwack, British Columbia	188	John Procee
Grand Rapids, Michigan	702	Joel R. Beeke, John Byl, Darryl Dedert, Brian DeVries, and Simon Yin
Harrison, Arkansas	97	Terreth Klaver
Hull, Iowa	93	Pieter van der Hoek
Jordan Station, Ontario	308	Brian Najapfour
Kinnelon, New Jersey	175	Reuel Xavier
Plymouth, Wisconsin	25	Michael Fintelman
Tillsonburg, Ontario	184	Ian Macleod
Total	2,195	

== Schools ==
The churches of the Heritage Reformed Congregations run three schools.

- Grace Christian Academy, Grand Rapids, Michigan
- Jordan Christian School, Jordan Station, Ontario
- Oxford Reformed Christian School, Mount Elgin, Ontario
