= Joel Beeke =

American theologian and academic

The Reverend Joel R. Beeke
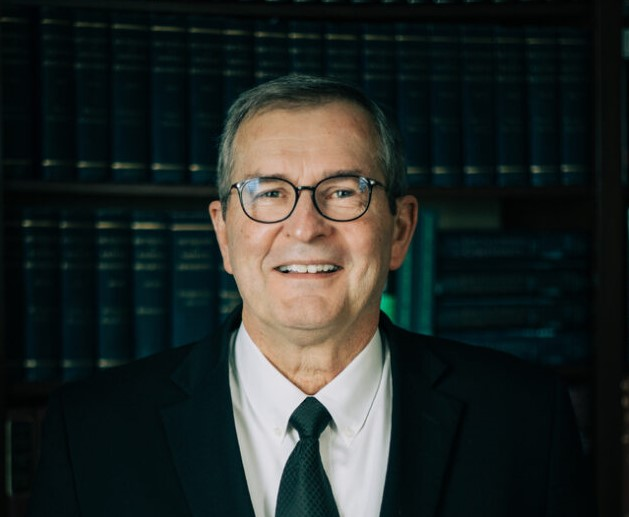
- Born: December 9, 1952 (age 73); Kalamazoo, Michigan, U.S.
- Education: Westminster Theological Seminary (PhD)
- Occupations: Pastor, Theologian, Professor, Seminary Chancellor
- Notable work: Reformed Systematic Theology; Meet the Puritans; A Puritan Theology; Reformed Preaching; Puritan Reformed Theology; Debated Issues in Sovereign Predestination
- Spouse: Mary Kamp (m. 1989)
- Children: 3
- Denomination: NRC (1978–1993); HRC (1993–present)
- Theological work
- Tradition or movement: Reformed
- Main interests: Calvinism; Puritanism; Historical and Systematic Theology

Joel Robert Beeke (born December 9, 1952) is an American Reformed theologian who serves as a pastor in the Heritage Reformed Congregations and as chancellor of Puritan Reformed Theological Seminary. He helped found Puritan Reformed Theological Seminary in 1995 under the oversight of the Heritage Reformed Congregations, serving as its president until assuming the chancellorship in 2023. He teaches homiletics, systematic theology, and practical theology at the seminary.

Beeke has served as adjunct faculty at several institutions, including Reformed Theological Seminary, Grand Rapids Theological Seminary (now Cornerstone Theological Seminary), and Westminster Theological Seminary in Philadelphia, Pennsylvania (1993–1998). He lectured in homiletics at Westminster Seminary California in Escondido, California from 1995 to 2001.

In 1994, Beeke founded Reformation Heritage Books, serving as its president and editorial director until 2022, when he became board chairman. He serves as editor of the Puritan Reformed Journal and The Banner of Sovereign Grace Truth magazine, the periodical of the Heritage Reformed Congregations. He is also president of Inheritance Publishers and vice president of the Dutch Reformed Translation Society.

Beeke has written on systematic and historical theology, focusing on the Puritans, Calvinism, and the doctrines of grace, as well as pastoral ministry and Christian living. In 2018, a Festschrift entitled Puritan Piety: Writings in Honor of Joel R. Beeke was published, including contributions from Richard A. Muller, Chad Van Dixhoorn, Michael A. G. Haykin, Sinclair B. Ferguson, W. Robert Godfrey, and Leland Ryken.

== Early life and education ==
Joel Robert Beeke was born on December 9, 1952, in Kalamazoo, Michigan, the fourth of five children born to John Beeke (1920–1993) and Johanna (née Van Strien) Beeke (1920–2012). His father, John Beeke, was born in Krabbendijke, the Netherlands, and immigrated to the United States with his family at age seven. The Beeke family were members of the Netherlands Reformed Congregations, where John Beeke served as a ruling elder for forty years.

After briefly serving in the United States Army Reserve, Beeke studied religion and history at Western Michigan University from 1971 to 1973 before transferring to Thomas Edison State College, where he earned a Bachelor of Arts degree with a specialization in religious studies.

In 1974, Beeke was accepted as a theological student to the Netherlands Reformed Theological School under the tutelage of J. C. Weststrate, a minister from the Netherlands. From 1974 to 1978, Beeke studied under Weststrate in St. Catharines, Ontario, completing studies equivalent to a Master of Divinity degree. For the academic studies he moved with his first wife to Canada, supported by the Netherlands Reformed Congregations Student Support Fund.

In 1982, Beeke enrolled in the doctoral program at Westminster Theological Seminary, focusing on the doctrine of assurance. From 1984 to 1986, he lectured in systematic theology at the Center for Urban Theological Studies in Philadelphia. In 1985 and 1986, he lectured in systematic theology at Westminster Theological Seminary. Beeke received his doctoral candidacy in June 1986. He earned his PhD in Reformation and Post-Reformation historical theology in May 1988. His dissertation was entitled "Personal Assurance of Faith: English Puritanism and the Dutch 'Nadere Reformatie' from Westminster to Alexander Comrie (1640–1760)."

== Ministry ==
=== Netherlands Reformed Congregations (1978–1993) ===
Upon completing his studies under J. C. Weststrate, Beeke entered the ministry of the Netherlands Reformed Congregations. After passing his candidacy examinations, he became eligible to receive a pastoral call in November 1977. After receiving calls from eleven congregations in December 1977, Beeke accepted a call to serve as pastor of the Netherlands Reformed Congregation in Sioux Center, Iowa, in January 1978. He was installed on March 29, 1978, by J. C. Weststrate. Beeke was the first minister ordained in the Netherlands Reformed Congregations who was not a native Dutch speaker.

Beeke served as pastor of the Netherlands Reformed Congregation in Sioux Center until 1981. While there, he helped found the Netherlands Reformed Christian School in Rock Valley, Iowa, serving as board president. From 1980 to 1992, he served as clerk of the Netherlands Reformed synod, and from 1980 to 1993, he was president of the Netherlands Reformed Book and Publishing Committee.

In March 1981, Beeke accepted a call to serve as minister of the Ebenezer Netherlands Reformed Church in Franklin Lakes, New Jersey. He was installed in August 1981. While pastoring at Ebenezer Netherlands Reformed Church, Beeke served as board chairman of the Netherlands Reformed school of Clifton-Franklin Lakes.

From 1984 to 1993, he edited Paul, the Netherlands Reformed Congregations' missions journal, and from 1985 to 1993, he edited The Banner of Truth, the denomination's periodical.

In 1982, Beeke published his first books, Jehovah Shepherding His Sheep and Backsliding: Disease and Cure. The same year, he co-authored the Bible Doctrine Student Workbook with his brother, James W. Beeke.

In October 1986, he accepted a pastoral call to the First Netherlands Reformed Congregation in Grand Rapids, Michigan, and was installed in December 1986. From 1986 to 1992, Beeke provided theological instruction in systematic theology, ethics, church history, liturgy, and missiology for the Netherlands Reformed Theological School. He also became president of Inheritance Publishers.

=== Heritage Reformed Congregations (1993–present) ===
In 1993, the synod of the Netherlands Reformed Congregations deposed the consistory of the First Netherlands Reformed Congregation of Grand Rapids. The consistory and the majority of the church's membership formed a new denomination named the Heritage Netherlands Reformed Congregation (renamed the Heritage Reformed Congregations in 2003), and Beeke continued serving as pastor. Eight other congregations subsequently joined the new denomination. Following this division, Beeke helped establish a new denominational periodical entitled The Banner of Sovereign Grace Truth.

Beeke served as editorial director of Reformation Heritage Books beginning in 1994. In the same year, he became vice chairman of the Dutch Reformed Translation Society, which works to translate the writings of Herman Bavinck and other Dutch Nadere Reformatie authors into English. Between 1994 and 2005, Beeke was a staff editor for Christian Observer.

=== Puritan Reformed Theological Seminary ===
In 1995, the synod of the Heritage Netherlands Reformed Congregations established Puritan Reformed Theological Seminary as the denomination's pastoral training institution. Beeke was the first professor at the seminary. In 1998, the synod of the Free Reformed Churches of North America selected Puritan Reformed Theological Seminary as the training institution for their ministerial students. Beeke has taught homiletics, systematic theology, and practical theology at the seminary since its founding.

In 2023, Beeke transitioned from the seminary presidency to the chancellorship.

== Personal life ==
In 1989, Beeke married Mary Kamp, a nurse and schoolteacher, and his second wife. Joel and Mary Beeke co-authored How Can We Build a Godly Marriage? They have three children and ten grandchildren. Beeke resides in Grand Rapids, Michigan.

=== Controversies and Schism ===
Beeke was separated in 1986 and divorced in 1988 from his first wife. His divorce occurred on biblical grounds after he accepted a pastoral call to the First Netherlands Reformed Congregation (NRC) of Grand Rapids in 1986. The controversy that resulted in a schism in the NRC and ultimately led to the forming of the Heritage Reformed Congregations (HRC) centered on the fitness for office of ministers who had been divorced and remarried, specifically concerning Beeke, the pastor of the large First NRC of Grand Rapids.

==== Divorce and Synodical Crisis (1993) ====
The NRC Synod had previously ruled on the issue in 1988 that "an officebearer who is declared an innocent party in a biblical divorce situation by means of adultery may not be disciplined" and declared the matter "closed". However, the issue continued to cause unrest.

A special NRC Synod was called on June 30 and July 1, 1993, partly motivated by requests from Classis Midwest and Classis East seeking clarity on the status of divorced office-bearers in active service. The Dutch sister denomination, the Gereformeerde Gemeenten, expressed sorrow regarding the troubles and urged the NRC to seek unity and act in accordance with Scripture and the Reformed Church Order.

During the Synod, Beeke read a prepared statement from his consistory indicating that they could not accept a decision that would prohibit a divorced office-bearer from serving in the congregations, stating they would obey Scripture and the Church Order. The Synod determined this failure to uphold their oath of office was insubordination. By a large majority, the Synod voted to depose Rev. Beeke and the entire consistory for schismatic actions.

==== Insubordination Charge ====
The Synod viewed this statement as an unwillingness to abide by a Synodical decision. They demanded a direct "Yes" or "No" answer as to whether the consistory was willing to comply with any decision the Synod might make, while preserving the consistory's right to appeal if the decision was contrary to God's Word or church order.

The consistory subsequently withdrew its original letter, but refused to give the direct "Yes" or "No" answer, reiterating only their obedience to Scripture and the Church Order. The Synod determined this failure to uphold their oath of office was insubordination. By a large majority, the Synod voted to depose Rev. Beeke and the entire consistory for schismatic actions.

Following the deposition, Synod delegates were forcibly evicted from the First NRC building and reconvened at the Covell Avenue church. The NRC Synod president asserted that the Crescent Street building belonged to the denomination, a claim disputed by the deposed consistory's attorney under Michigan law. Later that evening, the members of the First NRC congregation voted by a 77% margin (191–53), counting only male professing members, to "continue the present consistory and reject the synod’s deposition," creating a de facto split. Approximately 780 of the 1,000 members of the church supported the deposed leadership.

==== Formation of the Heritage Reformed Congregations (HRC) ====
The rejected leadership and congregation subsequently formed the Heritage Netherlands Reformed Congregation in 1993. The denomination later changed its name to the Heritage Reformed Congregations (HRC) in 2003. Eight other churches joined the Grand Rapids congregation, bringing the denominational membership to about two thousand. The group also launched a new denominational periodical called The Banner of Sovereign Grace Truth.

A civil lawsuit, First Netherlands Reformed Congregation et al vs. Boerkoel Jr., Cornelius et al, which listed Joel R. Beeke as a defendant, was filed on 10 of September 1993 in the 17th Circuit Court of Kent County, but was voluntarily dismissed shortly thereafter on 20 September 1993.

==== Theological Context ====
Although Beeke's divorce status was the occasion for the separation, there were clearly underlying theological issues that would likely have caused the split regardless. The men who separated were moving to make the Gospel much more central in their ministries. The HRC later sought to adopt the Westminster Standards along with the Three Forms of Unity to oppose theological currents like the New Perspective on Paul and Federal Vision theologies.

The Reformed Church in the United States (RCUS) Interchurch Relations Committee (IRC) investigated the HRC and found them to be "well within the mainstream of orthodox Reformed churches" and opposed to New Perspective and Federal Vision theology.

The RCUS subsequently affirmed the HRC's reception into the membership of the North American Presbyterian and Reformed Council (NAPARC).

== Publications ==
Beeke has authored and co-authored over 120 books, edited 120 books, and contributed articles to various publications, journals, and periodicals. His works have been translated into numerous languages including Albanian, Arabic, Chinese, Dutch, French, German, Hebrew, Hungarian, Indonesian, Italian, Japanese, Korean, Maltese, Persian, Polish, Portuguese, Punjabi, Romanian, Russian, Slovak, Spanish, and Urdu.

Beeke has contributed to periodicals such as The Banner of Truth, The Banner of Sovereign Grace Truth, Christian Observer, Outlook, Reformation and Revival, and Tabletalk. His articles have appeared in theological journals including Calvin Theological Journal, Master's Seminary Journal, Puritan Reformed Journal, Southern Baptist Journal of Theology, Unio Cum Christo, and Westminster Theological Journal. He has also contributed to academic reference works such as The Cambridge Companion to John Calvin, The Oxford Dictionary of National Biography, and The Oxford Encyclopedia of the Reformation.

== Sources ==
- Haykin, Michael A. G.; Smalley, Paul M. (2018). Puritan Piety: Writings in Honor of Joel R. Beeke. United Kingdom: Christian Focus. ISBN 978-1527101586.

== Select bibliography ==
- Assurance of Faith: Calvin, English Puritanism, and the Dutch Second Reformation. American University Studies. Vol. 89. New York: Peter Lang. 1991. ISBN 0-8204-1428-X.
- Donald K. McKim, ed. (2004). Calvin on Piety. Cambridge: Cambridge University Press. pp. 125–152. ISBN 0-521-81647-5.
- The Quest for Full Assurance: The Legacy of Calvin and His Successors. Edinburgh: Banner of Truth. 1999. ISBN 0-85151-745-5.
- Meet the Puritans: With a Guide to Modern Reprints. Grand Rapids, MI: Reformation Heritage Books. 2006. ISBN 978-1-60178-000-3.
- Living for God's Glory: An Introduction to Calvinism. Orlando, FL: Reformation Trust. 2008. ISBN 978-1-56769-105-4.
- A Puritan Theology: Doctrine for Life. Grand Rapids, MI: Reformation Heritage Books. 2012. ISBN 978-1-60178-166-6.
- Debated Issues in Sovereign Predestination: Early Lutheran Predestination, Calvinian Reprobation, and Variations in Genevan Lapsarianism. Reformed Historical Theology. Vol. 42. Göttingen, Germany: Vandenhoeck & Ruprecht. 2017. ISBN 978-3-525-55260-5.
- Reformed Preaching: Proclaiming God's Word from the Heart of the Preacher to the Heart of His People. Wheaton, IL: Crossway. 2018. ISBN 978-1-4335-5927-3.
- Reformed Systematic Theology. Vol. 1. Wheaton, IL: Crossway. 2019–2024. ISBN 978-1-4335-5983-9.
- Puritan Reformed Theology: Historical, Experiential, and Practical Studies for the Whole of Life. Grand Rapids, MI: Reformation Heritage Books. 2020. ISBN 978-1-60178-811-5.
