= Alexander Comrie =

Scottish-Dutch theologian

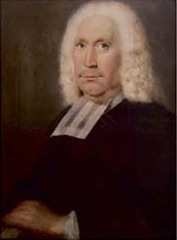
- Born: 1708; Scotland
- Died: 1774 (aged 65–66)
- Occupation: Theologian

Alexander Comrie (1708–1774) was a Scottish-Dutch theological writer against rationalism.

== Biography ==
Comrie was born in Scotland. When he was a young man, he went over to Holland, where he was placed in a mercantile house. In his twentieth year when crossing a lake not far from Leyden, he was shipwrecked; but swimming ashore near Woubrugge, and observing a light in a neighbouring farmhouse, he found shelter for the night, and found likewise in the farmer a congenial friend, who encouraged his desire to study or the church, and got for him the means of taking his course at the universities of Groningen and Leyden.

In 1734 he took at Leyden the degrees of master of arts and doctor of philosophy, and immediately after he was elected minister of the parish of Woubrugge, where he had found shelter and friendship after his shipwreck. He remained minister there till 1773, the year before his death, discharging his pastoral duties with singular assiduity among a people who appreciated in the highest degree his high character and his fervent zeal for the old Calvinistic doctrines.

It was in Comrie's time that some of the ministers, professors, and theological writers of Holland began to maintain rationalist views; in Comrie they found one of their most unflinching opponents. In two ways Comrie opposed the rising tide: he wrote original controversial treatises, and he translated for popular use some of the ablest works in practical and devotional theology that were appearing in his native country.

The names of his opponents, Schultens, Van den Os, Alberti, and Jan van den Honert, are now nearly forgotten even in Holland. Van den Os, as minister of Zwolle, had declared that no church articles could have power to decide in matters of faith, for the holy scriptures were admitted to be the true rule, and each man was at liberty to receive them according to his individual interpretation; also that the synod of Dort did not mean to set forth what was to be received as the truth for all time, but only for the time then being and till further light should be obtained. Van den Honert raised questions respecting the fundamental doctrine of justification by faith, which seemed to Comrie to involve the surrender of all that had been taught on that subject by Martin Luther and John Calvin. Notwithstanding the strenuous opposition of Comrie and his friends, the cause of rationalism advanced steadily among the clergy and in the universities. But the attachment of the people of Holland to that gospel of which he was a champion continued to prevail to a very large extent. It is in that class that the name of Comrie still lives, and the books which he wrote are still a power.

== Works ==
The following is a translated list of the principal writings of Comrie published in the Dutch language, as recently compiled by Professor Kuyper, D.D., of Amsterdam:

- "The A B C of Faith, an Exposition of Scripture Similitudes, illustrating Faith."
- "On the Properties of a Saving Faith," 2 vols.
- "On Justification by Direct Imputation."
- "On Justification by Faith wrought in us by Grace."
- "On the Languishing Condition of Faith in the heart of the Believer," 2 vols.
- "Exposition of the Heidelberg Catechism."
- "Examination of the Proposition of General Toleration in order to reconcile Calvinism to Arminianism," 2 vols.

The following are among the books which he translated or edited:

- Voetius, "The Mystic Power of Godliness."
- Shepherd, "The Ten Virgins."
- Marshall, "The Doctrine of Sanctification."
- Boston, "The Covenant of Grace."
- Chauncy, "The Westminster Catechism illustrated."
