= Whitefield College of the Bible =

Coordinates: 54.380°N 6.329°W

- Motto: Endued to Stand
- Type: Independent
- Established: 1981
- Affiliations: Free Presbyterian Church of Ulster
- President: Ian Paisley
- Principal: Timothy Nelson
- Location: Belfast, County Antrim, Northern Ireland
- Colors: Navy and Red

Whitefield College of the Bible is an independent theological college located in Banbridge, County Down, Northern Ireland. It is operated by the Free Presbyterian Church of Ulster. The college currently holds lectures in Martyrs Memorial Free Presbyterian Church in Belfast. The college has no association with any governmental education system and holds independent status.

== About the college ==
The college was named after the 18th century Christian Evangelist, George Whitefield. A portrait of George Whitefield by Samuel McCausland was commissioned for the opening.

The college was formally opened on 3 October 1981 by Bob Jones, chancellor of Bob Jones University, South Carolina, United States, after receiving the key from the president of the college Reverend Ian Paisley.

The college was situated at Lawrencetown House. The country house and estate of 30 acres was purchased and renovated at a cost of approximately £170,000.

In 2016 Lawrencetown House was sold and lectures moved to the Jubilee Complex of the Martyrs Memorial Free Presbyterian Church.

=== Second campus ===
In 2021, the Free Presbyterian Church of Ulster announced they would construct a new purpose built campus in Tandragee, County Armagh. Armagh City, Banbridge and Craigavon Borough Council granted planning permission for the construction of the extension in 2023. Construction commenced in November 2024. The new Tandragee college was officially opened on 14 March 2026.

== Branches ==
Aside of the main campus being in Northern Ireland, Whitefield has branches of the college in Greenville, South Carolina, United States (formerly sharing the same name but was later renamed the Geneva Reformed Seminary) and Toronto, Ontario, Canada.

== Courses ==
Whitefield offers a 4-year course which is compulsory for entry into the ministry of the Free Presbyterian Church of Ulster. It comprises

- Missionary principles
- Cults & comparative religions
- English
- Systematic theology
- Pastoral theology
- Bible survey
- Christian ethics
- Church History
- Personal Evangelism and Christian doctrine
- Homiletics
- Exegesis
- Hermeneutics
- Historical theology
- Greek (2-year)
- Hebrew (1-year)

Whitefield also offers a 2-year basic course for Christian workers and those preparing for the mission field. It is the same as the above but without Hebrew language and systematic theology.
