= Puritan Reformed Theological Seminary =

Christian higher education school in United States

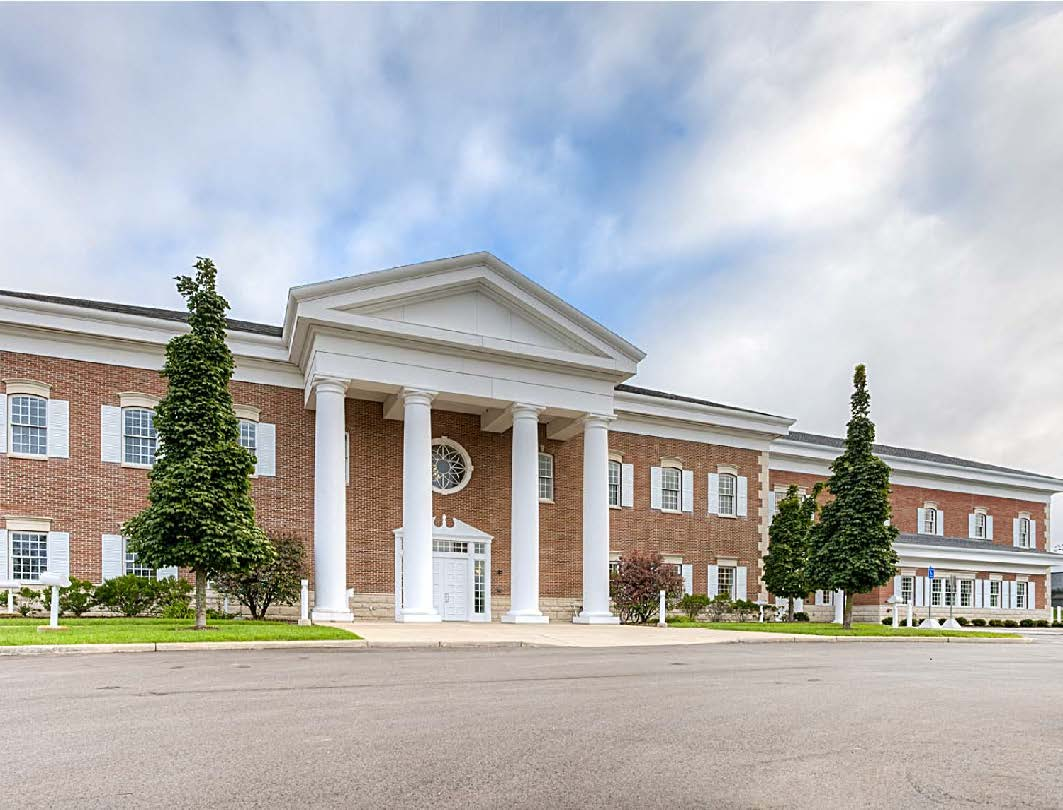
- Motto: Preparing students to serve Christ and His church through Biblical, experiential, and practical ministry.
- Type: Seminary
- Established: 1995
- Affiliations: Heritage Reformed Congregations and the Free Reformed Churches of North America
- Chancellor: Joel R. Beeke
- President: Adriaan C. Neele
- Vice-president: Gerald M. Bilkes
- Location: Grand Rapids, Michigan, United States
- Website: https://prts.edu/

Puritan Reformed Theological Seminary is a Reformed seminary in Grand Rapids, Michigan. Joel R. Beeke was the president of Puritan Reformed from 1995 to 2023 and currently serves as the chancellor, while Adriaan C. Neele serves as the president and Gerald M. Bilkes as the vice president. Founded by the Heritage Reformed Congregations in 1995, Puritan Reformed is a graduate school that offers both masters' and doctoral degrees. All of its faculty subscribe to the Three Forms of Unity and the Westminster Standards. Since 1998, the Free Reformed Churches of North America (FRCNA) has sent its theological students to Puritan Reformed.

== International Campuses ==
Apart from the main campus in Grand Rapids, Puritan Reformed has five global extension campuses for the ThM degree in Africa (Pretoria, South Africa), Asia (Taipei, Taiwan), Europe (London, United Kingdom), the Middle East (Cairo, Egypt) and South America (São José dos Campos, Brazil).

== Accreditation ==
The state of Michigan has granted Puritan Reformed a degree-granting charter and has approved their degree offerings. Puritan Reformed offers six accredited degrees: the Master of Divinity (MDiv), Master of Arts (MA), Master of Arts in Biblical Counseling (MABC), Master of Theology (ThM), Doctor of Ministry (DMin), and Doctor of Philosophy (PhD).

In February 2014, Puritan Reformed became accredited by the Association of Theological Schools in the United States and Canada.

The Master of Theology (ThM) degree program is also approved at the following five extension sites: Alexandria Governorate-Cairo Governorate, Egypt, London in United Kingdom, São José dos Campos, Brazil, Taipei City, Taiwan, and Pretoria, South Africa.

== Research Centers ==
The Puritan Research Center began in conjunction with the Theological University of Apeldoorn in Netherlands to establish an associated combined doctoral program and to encourage research in Puritan studies.

The Jonathan Edwards Center is part of international network centers dedicated to research, education, and publication on Jonathan Edwards and his context. The first Jonathan Edwards Center began at Yale University, and subsequently many such centers were planted in six continents. It was announced during the International Jonathan Edwards Conference at Yale University, on October 4, 2019, that Edwards Center-Midwest would be moving to Puritan Reformed.

The Center for Classical Reformed Systematic Theology was established in cooperation with the Vrije Universiteit Amsterdam for postdoctoral research in Reformed systematic theology.

The Geerhardus Vos Center was established at Puritan Reformed for the advancement and dissemination of research that advances the interrelationship and cross-fertilization of exegetical, biblical, and systematic theology in the context of Reformed epistemology.
