= Free Presbyterian Church of Ulster =

Calvinist denomination founded by Ian Paisley in 1951

- Classification: Protestant
- Orientation: Fundamentalist Calvinism
- Polity: Presbyterian
- Moderator: John Armstrong
- Associations: Whitefield College of the Bible
- Region: mainly Northern Ireland but also Great Britain, Republic of Ireland and the Isle of Man
- Founder: Ian Paisley
- Origin: 17 March 1951; Crossgar, Northern Ireland
- Separated from: Presbyterian Church in Ireland
- Separations: FPCNA
- Congregations: 61 (Northern Ireland); 22 (elsewhere)
- Members: 15,000
- Official website: www.freepresbyterian.org

Distinct from Free Presbyterian Church of Scotland and Free Church of Scotland (post 1900)

The Free Presbyterian Church of Ulster is a Presbyterian Christian denomination founded by Ian Paisley in 1951. (Note: Paisley founded both the Free Presbyterian Church of Ulster and the Democratic Unionist Party; however they are not officially linked, and DUP politicians are not necessarily church members.) Doctrinally, the church describes itself as fundamentalist, evangelical, and separatist, and is part of the reformed fundamentalist movement. Most of its members live in Northern Ireland, where the church is headquartered, and in County Donegal. The church has other additional congregations in the Republic of Ireland and also in Great Britain and Australia, and a sister denomination in North America, the Free Presbyterian Church of North America, which has congregations in Canada and the United States. It also has a sister denomination in Nepal which was formed from the Nepal mission to the Unreached in November 2013.

John Armstrong was Deputy Moderator of the General Assembly of the Church, and became Moderator in 2020, with Colin Mercer from Omagh as Deputy Moderator; Armstrong succeeded Gordon Dane, minister of the founding church in Crossgar.

== Founding ==
The Free Presbyterian Church of Ulster began on 17 March 1951 (St Patrick's Day) as the result of a conflict between some members of the local Lissara Presbyterian congregation in Crossgar, County Down, Northern Ireland, and the Down Presbytery of the Presbyterian Church in Ireland. At a meeting on 8 January 1951, the Down Presbytery banned the elders of the local congregation from using the church hall for a Gospel mission. When two elders refused to accept the Presbytery decision, they were immediately suspended. As a result of this disagreement with the Presbytery, five of the seven session members, all the Sunday School teachers, and 60 members of the congregation withdrew from the Down Presbytery and the Presbyterian Church in Ireland.

College lecturers of the Presbyterian Church in Ireland have suggested that the above story, though often quoted, is incomplete. While the Gospel Mission was a reason for the breakaway church forming, the Presbytery objection was not to the Mission or to the Gospel, but to the invited preacher, Ian Paisley. The Lissara Mission went ahead with a different preacher and Lissara Presbyterian Church continued to exist (albeit with fewer members), and a number of dissenting members later returned. However Free Presbyterians from Crossgar dispute that there ever was such a mission.

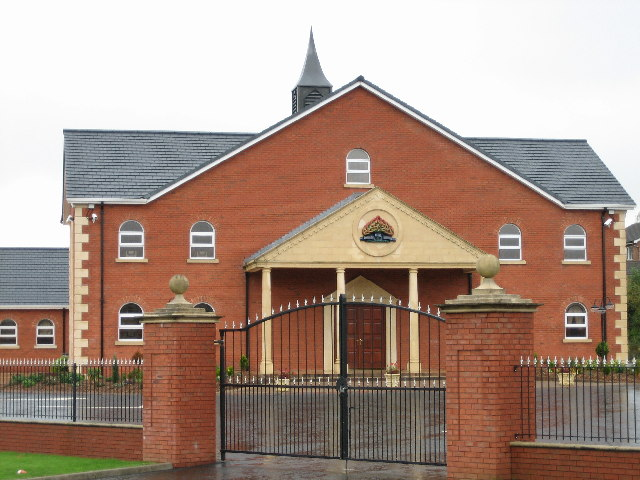
Lisburn Free Presbyterian Church

The departing elders felt the Presbyterian Church in Ireland denomination was inconsistent in allowing dances and parties to be held in the church halls while at the same time refusing a Gospel mission under the leadership of Ian Paisley. The Free Presbyterian Manifesto, which was published during the time leading up to the founding of the new church, also mentioned other reasons for the secession, such as the failure of the 1927 heresy trial in the Presbyterian Church in Ireland (PCI) to unseat Professor Davey for his controversial views, membership in the World Council of Churches (which the PCI later left), and poll irregularities in the election of elders. In that year, under the leadership of Paisley, four new congregations joined to form the Presbytery of the Free Presbyterian Church of Ulster.

Sydney Lince served as Moderator of the new church for a few months, but perceiving that Paisley was keen to take on the role, he stood down and asked Paisley to replace him. One of the inaugural elders of the new church, George Gibson, was expelled for his views on the doctrines of holiness as he was an Arminian, and subsequently rejoined Lissara Presbyterian Church in 1958. He had been the first secretary of the new church, had served as the architect of the first church building in the new denomination, and his office had been used as the registered office of the denomination.

== Recent history ==
=== Internal strife ===
The appointment of Paisley as First Minister of Northern Ireland in May 2007 led to a great deal of controversy within the Free Presbyterian Church. Many members of the church claimed that such an appointment put Paisley, as Moderator, at odds with many of the core beliefs of his church. The church had declared some years previously that it would be unbiblical to have terrorists or ex-terrorists in the government of Northern Ireland. The church is also strongly opposed to homosexuality, yet the First Minister's office is responsible for protecting LGBT rights in Northern Ireland. One of Paisley's strongest critics was his erstwhile ally and former prison cellmate Ivan Foster. A stormy meeting of the Presbytery of the church in September 2007 resolved the crisis by agreeing that Paisley would step down as Moderator in January 2008. The Presbytery met in Dungannon on 18 January 2008 to elect a new Moderator and selected Ron Johnstone, who had been Deputy Moderator. Paisley was therefore replaced as Moderator after more than 50 years in the post.

=== Opposition to homosexuality ===
Following a number of high-profile comments made by Democratic Unionist Party (DUP) Member of Parliament (MP) Iris Robinson, the Advertising Standards Authority upheld a finding that an advertisement placed by the Kirk Session of the Sandown Free Presbyterian Church breached advertising codes. The church had taken out the 540-word advertisement in the News Letter on 1 August 2008 (one day before the annual Belfast Gay Pride event) calling homosexuality "an abomination"; it "defined homosexuals as perverts and called on religious followers to maintain a very public stance against the gay community". The decision was later overturned and the church cleared of all wrongdoing.

== Doctrine ==
The church adheres to Calvinist doctrines. It also describes itself as fundamentalist, which it sees as an appropriate term to describe its stance of being anti-liberal. Fundamentalism has evolved over the years to where the original five essential doctrines that one had to hold to be considered fundamentalist—namely: the inerrancy of the Bible, the literal nature of the Biblical accounts, the Virgin Birth of Christ, the bodily resurrection and physical return of Christ, the substitutionary atonement of Christ on the cross—were mixed with "biblical separatism", a doctrine that advocates avoiding any public or private worship with people of other denominations that it considers apostates or heretics. At the start of Paisley's ministry this separatism was focused heavily on the Presbyterian Church in Ireland, a denomination from which it drew many of its initial members. For the FPC, the main target of its doctrinal ire, however, has always been and still continues to be the Roman Catholic Church. From 2011 until 2015, its main website greeted visitors with a statement on the FPC's disapproval of the Catholic Mass, disputing "the false notion... that there is little difference" between the Mass and Protestant communion.

Baptism and the Lord's Supper are recognised as sacraments of the Free Presbyterian Church of Ulster. Members are allowed to determine the proper mode (immersion, pouring, sprinkling) and subjects (adult believers or believers' children) that they prefer, but the church does not adhere to baptismal regeneration. The Lord's Supper is observed monthly, unless a local congregation prefers a more frequent observance. The ordinance of woman's headcovering is observed. Alongside the Free Presbyterian Articles of Faith, the Westminster Standards are considered doctrinal standards subordinate to the Bible.

For many outside the church, political and religious opposition to the Catholic Church, considered by the Free Presbyterians to be a Protestant Reformation principle represents the single most distinctive characteristic of this denomination, not least because this was a distinctive characteristic of Ian Paisley's own theological outlook.

== Ecclesiology ==
The FPC (on 18 May 2005) published a Book of Church Order in which its governmental policies and procedures are set forth publicly.

The polity of the FPC includes allowing a cleric such as Paisley to hold an apparently indefinite term of office as Moderator. However, following a dispute over Paisley's political activities, he agreed to step down as Moderator in January 2008. He was succeeded by Ron Johnstone. The North American branch of the denomination has elected its own moderator since 2005.

== Churches worldwide ==
From four churches in 1951, the denomination grew and peaked at 75 by 1997. Today it has about 60 congregations in Northern Ireland and a total of about 100 throughout the world, including England, Scotland, the Republic of Ireland (chiefly in County Donegal and County Monaghan), Canada, the United States, Nepal and Australia. According to the 2011 Northern Ireland census, 10,068 people identified as Free Presbyterian in Northern Ireland. As of 2004, missionaries were serving in India, Jamaica, Kenya, the Republic of Ireland, Spain, the Philippines and Germany. Since then new mission fields opened in Liberia, Nepal and Uganda.

In Kenya, the church's missionaries work with Glory Bible Church. In Liberia the forming Free Presbyterian Church in Liberia has 4 congregations.

The church currently operates two Bible colleges for the training of ministers and missionaries. These are the Whitefield College of the Bible, formerly based in Banbridge, County Down, but now relocated to Belfast, and the Geneva Reformed Seminary in Greenville, South Carolina, USA.

The church in North America has been independent of the Ulster Presbytery since 2005, and has its own Moderator. Frank McClelland was the first Moderator, and was succeeded in 2006 by David Mook (a minister in Phoenix, Arizona). The two Presbyteries are in full communion with each other. A Free Presbyterian International Congress was held 19–23 June 2006 in Martyrs Memorial Free Presbyterian Church in Belfast, attended by Free Presbyterians from all over the world. The Nepal Free Presbyterian Church elects its own Moderator, currently the Paul Thapa. This Presbytery is also in full communion with the other two.

== Church layout ==
Free Presbyterian Churches are usually of simple design, following Protestant ideals dating back to the Reformation. This contrasts with traditional Roman Catholic and Anglican Churches, which tend to be ornamented. The church states that this shows humility and allows the member to focus on worship.

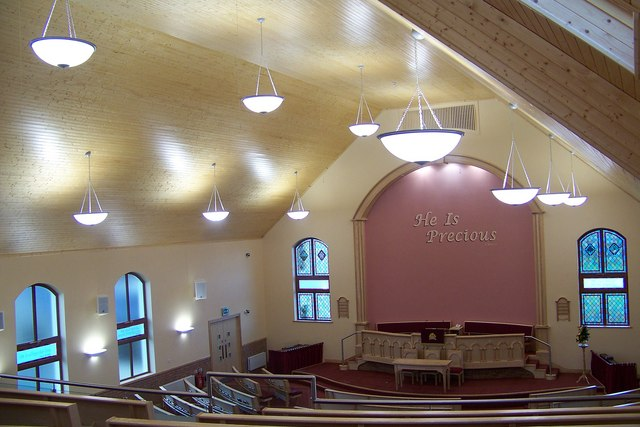
Interior of Tandragee Free Presbyterian Church

Churches usually include the following:

- Pulpit – Generally centre focal point, adorned with a pulpit fall.
- Communion table – Sits in the centre of the church, at the front, usually in front of the pulpit (if the pulpit is in the middle).
- Pews – These differ in design and shape.
- Organ/piano – Nearly all churches will have some sort of musical accompaniment. This is usually a piano, with larger churches owning an organ.
- Verse of Scripture – A verse of the Bible is placed on the wall behind the pulpit, where it is most visible. This can be painted or letters which are affixed to the wall.
- Prayer room/crèche – A prayer room is located via a different door to the main hall. Depending on the financial capabilities of the church, the prayer room and crèche may be together. The crèche is used for young children, and has a window whereby one can see the preacher, and perhaps a speaker system for audio.
- Depending on the size and finances of the church, there may be additional rooms such as Youth Fellowship rooms, Sunday School rooms, and kitchens.

== Church motto and logo ==
Burning bush logo and motto

The motto of the Free Presbyterian Church is the same as the Presbyterian Church in Ireland: Ardens sed virens ("burning but flourishing"). It is incorporated in a scroll form on the logo, shown here.

In all Free Presbyterian Churches, the pulpit fall bears the motto and logo of the Church, albeit in slightly different designs.

== Moderators ==
- Sydney Lince – 1951
- Ian Paisley – 1951–2008
- Ron Johnstone – 2008–2012
- John Greer – 2012–2015
- Thomas Murray – 2015–2018
- Gordon Dane – 2018–2020
- John Armstrong – 2020–2023
- Samuel Murray – 2023

== Books ==
Glynn Moore and Sharon Dick, The History of Crossgar Free Presbyterian Church of Ulster, A New Beginning ..(Crossgar, Co. Down: Crossgar Free Presbyterian Church of Ulster, 2001) ISBN 1-84030-116-3

== See also ==
- Free Presbyterian Church (Australia)
- Free Presbyterian Church of Scotland, a different denomination, begun in 1893 (for the differences between the two, see the relevant section of that article).
- Religion in the United Kingdom
