= International Conference of Reformed Churches =

Federation for reformed churches

- Type: Fellowship
- Classification: Protestant
- Orientation: Confessionally Reformed
- Origin: 1981; 45 years ago
- Members: 772,432
- Official website: www.icrconline.com

The International Conference of Reformed Churches (ICRC) is a federation of Reformed or Calvinist churches around the world. The ICRC convenes international meetings every four years.

The ICRC was founded in 1981 at Groningen in the Netherlands.

The theology of the ICRC is more conservative than the larger World Communion of Reformed Churches and is similar to that of the World Reformed Fellowship. The participating churches endorse the four Reformed confessions: the Heidelberg Catechism, Belgic Confession, Canons of Dort, and Westminster Confession of Faith.

In 2023, the moderator of the ICRC is Reverend Dr Dick Moes.

== History ==
=== Precedents ===
Reformed Faith emerged in Europe, in the 16th Century. From then on, it spread through migration and missions throughout the world. Since the 19th century, Reformed Christians began to organize structures that allowed communion and the testimony of unity among Reformed people around the world.

In 1875, the Alliance of Reformed Churches that maintains the Presbyterian System (ARCPS) was organized in London. In 1891, the International Congregational Council (ICC) formed an umbrella of churches of the Reformed Tradition that adopted a system of congregational government.

In 1946, conservative reformed churches organized the Reformed Ecumenical Council (REC).

In 1970, ARCPS and ICC formed the World Alliance of Reformed Churches (WARC).

In the following decades, several denominations participated simultaneously in both organizations, aligning the REC increasingly with WARC, This approach would culminate in the merger between the two organizations in 2010, to form the World Communion of Reformed Churches.

=== Emergence ===
As the REC became increasingly liberal and closer to WARC, a group of conservative Reformed churches saw the need to form a new international organization of Reformed denominations. Thus, in 1982, the International Conference of Reformed Churches (ICRC) was formed. The first meeting of the conference was held in 1985. At the time, the founders of the conference were the Reformed Churches in the Netherlands (Liberated), Free Reformed Churches of Australia, Canadian and American Reformed Churches, Evangelical Presbyterian Church (Ireland), Free Church of Scotland and Reformed Churches in Indonesia.

In the following years, ICRC grew, bringing together conservative Reformed denominations from around the world. Even so, a large part of its members are simultaneously members of the World Reformed Fellowship and some are also members of the World Communion of Reformed Churches.

As of 2022, the ICRC is estimated to consist of 38 member denominations, which together have 784,905 individual members.

Between 2022 and 2024, the Kosin Presbyterian Church in Korea, the organization's largest denomination, lost about 12,000 members. In the same period, the Associate Reformed Presbyterian Church lost 5,000 members and the Orthodox Presbyterian Church gained a thousand members. Therefore, in 2025, the member churches of the CIIR will bring together around 772 thousand people.

== Members ==
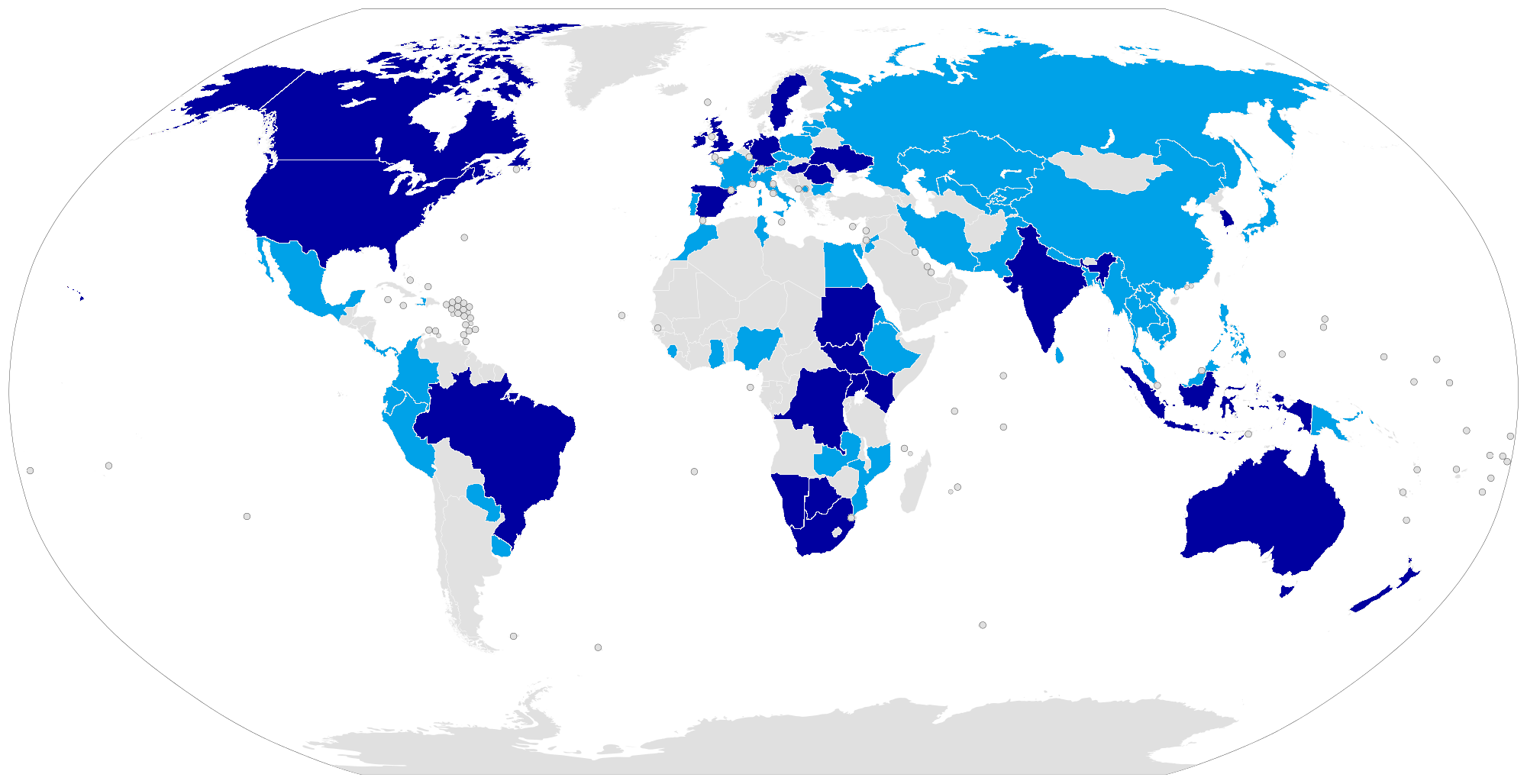
Countries with members of International Conference of Reformed Churches Countries with missions of members of International Conference of Reformed Churches

List of ICRC Members in 2023:

Country	denominational subfamily	Denomination	Number of congregations	Number of members	Year
Australia	Presbyterian	Presbyterian Church of Eastern Australia	16	719	2016
Australia	Continental reformed	Christian Reformed Churches of Australia	55	7,611	2022
Brazil	Continental reformed	Reformed Churches in Brazil	18	1,061	2022
Canada	Continental reformed	Canadian and American Reformed Churches	76	20,079	2024
Canada	Continental reformed	Heritage Reformed Congregations	10	2,186	2022
Democratic Republic of the Congo	Continental reformed	United Reformed Church in Congo	181	14,657	2012
India	Presbyterian	Presbyterian Free Church of Central India	18	756	2021
India	Presbyterian	Reformed Presbyterian Church of India	10	3,000	2004
India	Presbyterian	Reformed Presbyterian Church North East India	105	11,376	2021
India	Presbyterian	Anugraha Reformed Presbyterian Church of Bangalore	-	1,123	2022
India	Continental reformed	Evangelical Reformed Church of India	84	4,627	2022
Indonesia	Continental reformed	Calvinist Reformed Churches in Indonesia	16	1,439	2024
Indonesia	Continental reformed	Reformed Churches in Indonesia	234	32,892	2022
Ireland	Presbyterian	Evangelical Presbyterian Church (Ireland)	10	396	2021
Ireland	Presbyterian	Reformed Presbyterian Church of Ireland	41	2,065	2022
Kenya	Presbyterian	Africa Evangelical Presbyterian Church	100	10,000	2022
Netherlands	Continental reformed	Christian Reformed Churches in the Netherlands	181	66,572	2025
Netherlands	Continental reformed	Reformed Churches (Netherlands)	31	3,500	2024
Romania, Ukraine and Hungary	Presbyterian	Reformed Presbyterian Church of Central and Eastern Europe	25	370	2022
New Zealand	Continental reformed	Reformed Churches of New Zealand	21	3,530	2022
South Africa	Presbyterian	Free Church in Southern Africa	63	4,000	2004
South Africa	Continental reformed	Free Reformed Churches of South Africa	13	1,888	2022
South Africa, Nambia and Botswana	Continental reformed	Reformed Churches in South Africa	382	76,812	2022
South Korea	Presbyterian	Presbyterian Church in Korea (Koshin)	2,118	376,629	2024
South Korea	Presbyterian	Independent Reformed Church in Korea	4	208	2022
Spain	Continental reformed	Reformed Churches in Spain	4	310	2022
Sudan and South Sudan	Continental reformed	Sudanese Reformed Churches	34	6,000	2023
Uganda	Presbyterian	Presbyterian Church in Uganda	87	3,045	2019
Uganda	Presbyterian	Reformed Presbyterian Church in Africa (Uganda)	8	619	2022
United Kingdom, Germany, Sweden and Switzerland	Presbyterian	Evangelical Presbyterian Church in England and Wales	24	1,001	2021
United Kingdom	Presbyterian	Free Church of Scotland	126	11,700	2024
United Kingdom	Presbyterian	Free Church of Scotland (Continuing)	40	1,691	2022
United States of America	Presbyterian	Associate Reformed Presbyterian Church	260	25,692	2023
United States of America	Presbyterian	Orthodox Presbyterian Church	341	33,941	2025
United States of America	Continental reformed	United Reformed Churches in North America	140	25,004	2023
United States of America	Continental reformed	Reformed Church in the United States	45	3,438	2023
United States of America	Continental reformed	Free Reformed Churches of North America	23	5,505	2023
United States of America	Presbyterian	Reformed Presbyterian Church of North America	85	6,990	2023
World	Total	International Conference of Reformed Churches	5,029	772,432	2004-2024

=== Member Profile ===
1. Presbyterians (64.2%)
2. Continental Reformed (35.8%)

The Presbyterian Church in Korea (Koshin), alone, represents 48.76% of the individual members of the International Conference of Reformed Churches. Together, Presbyterians represent 64.16% of individual members. The continental Reformed represent 35.84%.

=== Candidates ===
In 2020, the Evangelical Presbyterian Church of Peru expressed interest in joining the ICRC, requesting support from the Orthodox Presbyterian Church to do so.

In 2023, a presbytery of the Presbyterian Church in America requested that the denomination apply for ICRC membership; the General Assembly referred this overture to its permanent Interchurch Relations Committee.

== Former members ==
The Reformed Churches in the Netherlands (Liberated) and Free Reformed Churches of Australia were founding denominations of the ICRC. However, none of them are currently part of the CIIR.

In 2017, the Reformed Churches in the Netherlands (Liberated) began to allow women's ordination, which is completely rejected by the other members of the organization. Consequently, the ICRC suspended the denomination's membership rights, and urged it to reverse its decision.

However, the Liberated Reformed Churches did not respond to the ICRC's request and continued to ordain women. Consequently, in 2022, the ICRC approved the definitive expulsion of the organization's denomination.
