= The Pilgrim's Churches =

The Pilgrim's Churches separated from the Gereja Masehi Injili di Timor in 1950. It was recognised by the Indonesian government in 1951. Contacts were made with Calvinist missions in Sumba. It has 5,000 members and 20 congregations. The church separated into two parts, one section retained the name Pilgrim's Church and the second part become Calvinist Reformed Churches in Indonesia.
