= Gereja-Gereja Reformasi Calvinis =

Christian denomination in Indonesia

The Gereja-Gereja Reformasi Calvinis di Indonesia (GGRCI) is a Reformed denomination in Indonesia. This denomination is a member of International Conference of Reformed Churches (ICRC). GGRCI has churches and mission works all around Indonesia, including in: Rote island, Sabu island, Timor island Java island, Sumba island, and Celebes island. GGRCI holds the Reformed confessions (Heidelberg Catechism, Belgic Confession, and Canons of Dort.

== Origin ==
The Calvinist Reformed Churches in Indonesia was established in 1950. Since then, the church grew rapidly. In 1959 there were six autonomous churches; in 1987, they had 20 congregations, 4,456 members, 112 elders and deacons and 13 ministers and 14 candidate ministers. In 1991, in the church synod they decided to hold the Reformed confessions. The Reformed Churches in East Sumba and the Gereja-Gereja Reformasi Calvinis become sister churches.

Since the denomination started using the name of the Calvinist Reformed Churches had previously called the Gereja Masefi Musafir, the Pilgrim Christian Church. In the Synod of 1992 the church changed its name to Pilgrim Christian Churches, Gereja-Gereja Masehi Musafir. In 1995 the church split into two parts. One part want to stay and hold in the Reformed faith, the other become liberal and evangelical. The Reformed part adopted the name Gereja-Gereja Reformasi Calvinis, the Calvinist Reformed Churches in Indonesia in 1999. The other group become the Pilgrim Christian Churches in Indonesia.

In 2002 the Gereja-Gereja Reformasi Musyafir separated from the church it has only one congregation with 100 members.

== Member churches ==
=== Timor island ===
- GGRC in Kupang has 4 mission points
- GGRC in Tarus
- GGRC in Kelapa Tonggi has one mission point
- GGRC in Bolok
- GGRC in Nunbaun Sabu

=== Sabo island ===
- GGRC in Deme
- GGRC in Eilogo

=== Mission points ===
- West Rote
- Oehau

== Relations with other churches ==
The church has official sister church relations with the Free Reformed Churches of Australia, Reformed Churches in the Netherlands (Liberated), Canadian and American Reformed Churches, International Conference of Reformed Churches.
