= Sister Churches =

Sister Churches may refer to:

- The Sister churches (Norway), two side-by-side churches in Granavollen, Gran, Hadeland, in Norway
- Sister Churches (ecclesiology), a term used in 20th century ecclesiology
