= Independent Reformed Church in Korea =

The Independent Reformed Church in Korea (IRCK) is a Conservative Christian denomination in South Korea. It was established in 1964, and was the only church to use Reformed in its name. It confess the Westminster Confession, the Heidelberg Catechism, the Canons of Dort and the ecumenical creeds.

It has its own seminary, the Theological Academy of the Independent Reformed Church.

It is a member of the International Conference of Reformed Churches.

The Independent Reformed Church was started in 1964 with only one church, because of a serious schism in the largest Presbyterian denomination regarding the issue or whether to join the World Council of Churches. Now the denomination consists of four small churches. The churches' membership includes about 552 persons, of whom 310 are communicant members as of 2005.

The IRCK has limited ecclesiastical fellowship with the Christian Reformed Churches (Netherlands) and the Reformed Churches in the Netherlands (Liberated), closer ties with the Orthodox Presbyterian Church, and fellowship in Korea with the Independent Reformed Presbyterian Church in Korea which has 8 congregations and six hundred souls.
