= Reformed Presbyterian Church of Uganda =

The Reformed Presbyterian Church of Uganda is an indigenous confessional Reformed and Presbyterian denomination in Uganda.

It was separated from the Presbyterian Church in Uganda. In 1989 controversy arose over a case of church discipline. Attempt were made at reconciliation, but the new denomination the Reformed Presbyterian Church was formed in 1990. The center of the Church's activities is in Kampala, Uganda. The denomination is a member of the World Communion of Reformed Churches and the World Reformed Fellowship.

The church had 5,000 members and dozens of congregations in 2004. The Reformed Presbyterian Church subscribes the Apostles Creed, Canons of Dort, Heidelberg Catechism, Westminster Confession and Westminster Larger Catechism.

It has growing church planting ministry in Uganda, and supports and runs several Christian schools.

== See also ==
- Reformed Presbyterian Church in Africa (Uganda)
- Religion in Uganda
