= Gereja-Gereja Reformasi di Indonesia =

Christian denomination in Indonesia

The Gereja-Gereja Reformasi di Indonesia or the Indonesian Reformed Churches is a confessional Reformed church in the country of Indonesia established by orthodox Calvinist Dutch missionaries.

== History ==
Missionaries came to Sumba in the late 1800s. The dominant Christian church in this region is the Evangelical Christian Church in Timor or the Gereja Masehi Injili di Timor. Sumba was a mission place assigned to the Reformed churches. After World War II missionary SPJ Goossens was suspended by the Gereja Zwolle of their position but some churches remained loyal to him. A schism occurred. Later this are become a mission field of the Reformed Churches in the Netherlands (Liberated). An existing congregations joined this effort. Gereja Zwoolle become the Gereja-Gereja Reformasi di Indonesia or the Reformed Churches of Indonesia in NTT in 1975. Sister church relation with the Reformed Churches in the Netherlands (Liberated) was established. The Reformed Church in Indonesia in Papua (GGRI-Papua) is also a result of the missionary effort of the Reformed Churches (Liberated) in 1956 as the most extensive evangelisation work in Indonesia. The first baptism took place in 1967 and the first converts were young people. In 1976 the first Classis were formed. The denomination was founded in 1988 when the first General assembly was formed. Currently there are 8,000 members, 17 organised congregations, and 21 church plant in the process of becoming official full status congregations and 3 Classes. Most congregations located in the isolated interior part of Papua Province. It has about 15 pastors, 8 candidate pastors and 30 evangelists. The Papua church has a Theological College in Boma.

The Reformed Church in Indonesia in Kalbar (GGRI-Kalbar) begun in 1948, was also a mission of the Reformed Churches in the Netherlands (Liberated). Between 1960 and 1993 8 local congregations were established. Later the GGI-Kalbar hag 19 churches, growing into 3 Classes and outreaches to more 15 places and 3,000 members. It has also a theological institute. These three churches held a joint National Synod meeting in 2011.

The church currently has almost 5,000 members and more than 14 congregations and 40 house fellowships.

== Doctrine ==
The GGRI-Kalbar, the GGRI-Papua and the GGRI-NTT also subscribe these Reformed standards:

- Apostles Creed
- Athanasian Creed
- Canons of Dort
- Heidelberg Catechism
- Westminster Confession of Faith
- Second Helvetic Confession

== Interchurch organisations ==
The Indonesian Reformed Church is a member of the International Conference of Reformed Churches. Close relationship with the Protestant Churches in Indonesia was also established.
