= Reformed Presbyterian Church of Central and Eastern Europe =

- Classification: Protestant
- Orientation: Calvinism
- Origin: 1998
- Separated from: Reformed Church in Hungary
- Congregations: 27
- Official website: www.reformatus.net/en/

The Reformed Presbyterian Church of Central and Eastern Europe (RPCCEE) is a Presbyterian denomination in Hungary, Romania and Ukraine. It split from the Reformed Church in Hungary in 1998, and has 27 congregations.

The Károlyi Gáspár Institute of Theology and Missions (KGTMI) had started in 1992, but in 1997 the Consultative Synod of the Reformed Church in Hungary expelled the seminary and all its students. The RPCCEE was formed the following year, and adopted as its confessional standards the Second Helvetic Confession and Heidelberg Catechism, as well as the Westminster Standards.

== Relation with other churches ==
RPCCEE is a member church of the International Conference of Reformed Churches and the World Reformed Fellowship. It also has direct fellowship relations with the Evangelical Presbyterian Church in England and Wales, Orthodox Presbyterian Church, Presbyterian Church of Brazil, Reformed Churches in South Africa and the United Reformed Churches in North America.
