= Reformed Presbyterian Church in Africa (Uganda) =

The Reformed Presbyterian Church in Africa (Uganda) was formed in 2007 by pastors and elders graduating from the Westminster Theological Seminary in Mbale, Uganda. In Uganda there are 10 congregations and 2 Presbyteries. In Kenya and Tanzania there is one Presbytery in each country.

The church adheres to the Reformed doctrine of the Westminster Confession of Faith and the Five points of Calvinism. The denomination is a member of the World Reformed Fellowship, and the World Communion of Reformed Churches.

== See also ==
- Reformed Presbyterian Church of Uganda
- Religion in Uganda
