= Free Church in Southern Africa =

The Free Church in Southern Africa grew out of the work of the missionaries of the Glasgow Missionary Society (c.1823), and after 1843 came under the care of missionaries of the Free Church of Scotland. Historically, the church has served mainly the Xhosa speaking people in eastern and western Cape region, stretching from Cape Town to Transkei. In 1900 the majority of the Free Church of Scotland joined with the United Presbyterian Church (Scotland) to form the United Free Church of Scotland. All the Free Church missionaries joined the United Free Church, leaving no missionaries to serve the many Xhosa Christians who remained faithful to the old Free Church. In 1908, in response to an appeal from the Xhosa church, Rev Alexander Dewar was appointed to King William's Town, and, for the next thirty-five years, served the church until he died in 1943. Four other missionaries, for longer or shorter periods, served alongside Mr Dewar. In 1944 the Rev Joseph McCracken of the Irish Evangelical Church served with others as Mr Dewar's successors. McCracken retired in 1974 and died in South Africa in 1987. In 1982 the church become independent, though remains in close connection with the Free Church of Scotland.

Dumisani Bible School and Theological Institute was formed by its first Principal, Rev William (Bill) Graham of the Free Church of Scotland, in King William's Town in 1987, to train pastors and church workers.

The church has more than 63 congregations and 4,000 members. The denomination is evangelical Presbyterian, sharing the same doctrinal standards as the Free Church of Scotland, subscribing to the Westminster Confession of Faith, Westminster Larger Catechism and Westminster Shorter Catechism,

The Free Church of Southern Africa is a member of the International Conference of Reformed Churches.

The Dumisani Theological Institute is the official theological training institute of the denomination. The beliefs of the Institute reflects that it is partnership with the Free Church of Scotland and the Free Church in Southern Africa and the Reformed Churches in South Africa. The Westminster Standards and the Three Forms of Unity are the accepted confessions.

A history of the FCSA was written by Bill and Elizabeth Graham under the title The Ochre and the Blue (Edinburgh: Free Church of Scotland Publications, 2009)
