= United Reformed Church in Congo =

United Reformed Church in Congo Église réformée unie du Congo
- Classification: Protestant
- Theology: confessional Reformed
- Polity: Presbyterian
- Moderator: Rev. Karbongo Kalala Malebongo
- Associations: International Conference of Reformed Churches
- Region: Democratic Republic of Congo
- Founder: Rev. Aron Kayayan
- Origin: 1983; Congo
- Branched from: Dutch Reformed Church in South Africa, Christian Reformed Church in North America
- Congregations: 200-250
- Members: 25,000

United Reformed Church in Congo (French: Église réformée confessante au Congo) was formerly the Confessing Reformed Church in Congo, and belongs to the Presbyterian and Reformed family of churches.

== History ==
The Church was formed thanks to a broadcasting program by Rev. Aron R. Kayayan in the late 1970s supported by the Dutch Reformed Church in South Africa and the Christian Reformed Church in North America. He was the director of a reformed radio broadcasting program. This was the Perspectives Reformees a French language radio broadcast, assuming the organisation of Back to God Hour of the Christian Reformed Church in North America. The French language radio programs was listened to by many people in Africa, in Haiti and in many Caribbean Islands. In Africa much Bible study started under the influence of the program. Kayayan preaching initiated the formation of a new denomination. The Eglise Reformee Confessante au Congo - the Confessional Reformed Church in Congo in English - was formed in 1983. The church changed its name to United Reformed Church, and adopted the Three Forms of Unity as their standard, and a Presbyterian-Synodal church government form. It was registered by the government on February 17, 2010. Exact number of membership was unknown it had 150 congregations and 10–12,000 members in the early 2000s. The church order is a French adaptation of the Christian Reformed Church in North America's Book of Church Order.

The church is growing easterward, up to Goma and Bukavu, where a couple of church plants started. Evangelists are present in Ubundu and Waligale.

As of 2010, there were 200 congregations served by 26 ministers.

== Doctrine ==
- Three Forms of Unity
- Canons of Dort
- Heidelberg Catechism
- Belgic Confession
- La Rochelle Confession of Faith

== Interchurch relations ==
- member of the International Conference of Reformed Churches
- Reformed Churches in the Netherlands (Liberated)
- United Reformed Churches in North America
- Reformed Church in the United States
- Reformed Churches in South Africa

It does not belong to the Church of Christ in Congo.

== Demographics ==
In 2012 the church had 43 parishes, 177 congregations, and 14,657 members served by 26 pastors and had 33 evangelists. It was represented in 10 provinces.

The Church has 200 - 250 congregations in the Democratic Republic of Congo with approximately 25,000 members. The church operates in several Congolese Provinces like Katanga Province, Kasai Oriental, Kasai Occidental, Orientale Province, South and North Kivu.
