= Free Reformed Churches of South Africa =

The Free Reformed Churches in South Africa (Afrikaans: Vrye Gereformeerde Kerke in Suid Afrika, VGKSA) is a federation of Protestant Christian churches. It follows Reformed Calvinist theology and has adopted the Dutch "three forms of unity" as its doctrinal standards: Canons of Dordt, Belgic Confession and the Heidelberg Catechism and subscribes to the three Ecumenical Creeds: The Apostles' Creed, The Nicene Creed and The Athanasian Creed.

== Overview ==
The first church was established in Pretoria on 8 October 1950. Eventually other churches were established; they are, in order of institution:

- FRC Pretoria, 1950
- FRC Cape Town, 1952
- FRC Johannesburg, 1957
- FRC Bethal, 1995
- FRC Pretoria-Maranata, 1997
- FRC Mamelodi, 2002
- FRC Soshanguve North, 2003

The FRC's Church Order is based on that which was written at the Synod of Dort 1618/19.

The Churches have sister-church relationships with the Canadian and American Reformed Churches, the Presbyterian Church in Korea and the Free Reformed Churches of Australia.

In addition to these contacts the FRC is also a member of the International Conference of Reformed Churches (ICRC)
