= Religion in Uganda =

Religion in Uganda (2024 census)
1. Catholicism (36.2%)
2. Anglicanism (29.0%)
3. Pentecostalism (14.3%)
4. Other Christian (2.20%)
5. Islam (13.2%)
6. No religion (0.20%)
7. Other religions (1.60%)
8. Unclassified (3.30%)

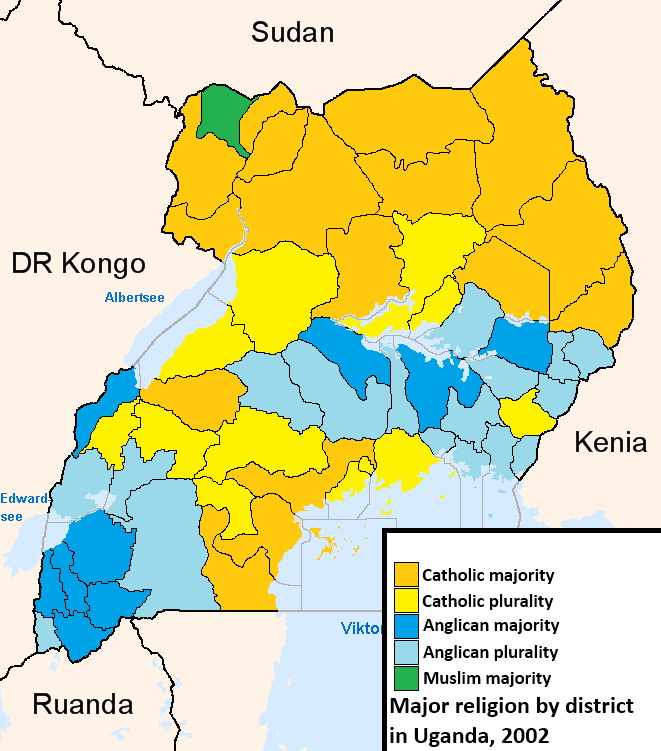
Predominant religion by district in Uganda according to the 2002 census

Christianity is the predominant religion in Uganda. According to the 2024 census, approximately 82 percent of the population was Christian, while around 13 percent of the population adhered to Islam, making it the largest minority religion. Catholicism and Anglicanism are the main Christian denominations in the country.

The northern and west Nile regions are dominated by Catholics, and Iganga District in the east of Uganda had the highest percentage of Muslims; Good Friday, Easter Monday, Eid al-Fitr, Eid al-Adha, and Christmas are recognized national holidays.

== Government policy ==
Freedom of religion is guaranteed by the Uganda Constitution, but religions are expected to be registered with the government and then to secure a five-year license; registered groups are exempt from direct taxation.

== Freedom of religion ==
In 2023, the country was scored 3 out of 4 for religious freedom by Freedom House.

Religious affiliation in Uganda
Affiliation	1991 census	2002 census	2014 census	2024 census
Christian	85.4%	85.2%	83.3%	81.8%
Catholic	44.5%	41.9%	38.7%	36.2%
Church of Uganda (Anglican)	39.2%	35.9%	31.6%	29.0%
Pentecostal	(Note: The 1991 census did not have separate categories for "None" and "Pentecostal" so the 1991 category of "Other Christian" includes "Pentecostal" and the 1991 category "Other non-Christian" includes "Baháʼí Faith" and "None".)	4.6%	10.9%	14.3%
Seventh-day Adventist	1.1%	1.5%	1.7%	2.0%
Baptist	(Note: The 1991 and 2002 censuses did not have separate categories for "Baptist" and also had separate categories for "Other Christian" and "Other non-Christian" and "Baháʼí Faith" so the 2014 category of "Other" includes those (minus the Baptists). The census states that "Others" includes those religions with less than .1% of the population and specifically mentions Salvation Army, Baháʼí, Jehovah’s Witnesses, Presbyterian, Hindus, Mammon, Jews and Buddhists.)	-	0.3%	
Eastern Orthodox Christian	<0.1%	0.1%	0.1%	0.1%
Other Christian	0.6%	1.2% (Note: If Pentecostals are merged in to allow better comparison with the 1991 figure for "Other Christians", it is 5.8%.)	-	0.2%
Muslim	10.5%	12.1%	13.5%	13.2%
Traditional	-	1.0%	0.1%	0.1%
Baháʼí Faith	-	0.1%	-	
None	-	0.9%	0.2%	0.2%
Other non-Christian	4.0%	1.6% (Note: If Baháʼí and None are merged in to allow better comparison with the 1991 figure for "Other non-Christians", it is 1.7%)-	1.5%	1.6%
Others	-	-	1.4%	3.3%
Notes

Religious affiliation in Uganda by region in 2002
Affiliation	Central Region	Eastern Region	Northern Region	Western Region
Catholic	41.2%	29.6%	59.2%	40.6%
Anglican/Protestant	30.1%	43.0%	25.3%	45.2%
Pentecostal	5.9%	6.1%	3.1%	3.4%
Seventh-day Adventist	1.9%	1.0%	0.5%	2.6%
Eastern Orthodox Christian	0.2%	0.1%	0.1%	0.2%
Other Christian	0.8%	2.1%	0.5%	1.1%
Muslim	18.4%	17.0%	8.5%	4.5%
Traditional	0.1%	0.1%	1.6%	0.1%
Other	0.6%	1.0%	1.3%	2.3%

== Christianity ==
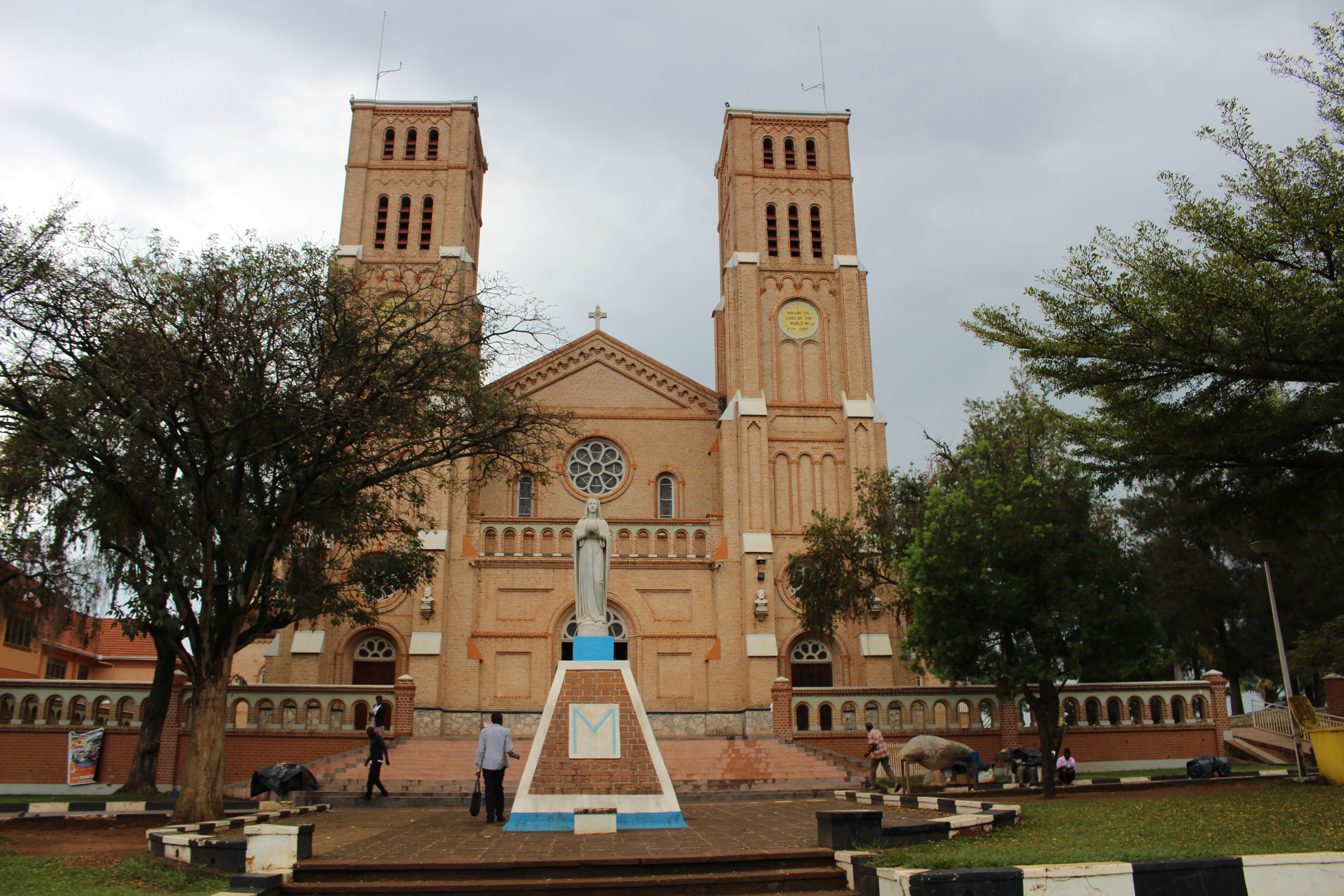
Rubaga Cathedral, the seat for the Catholic Church

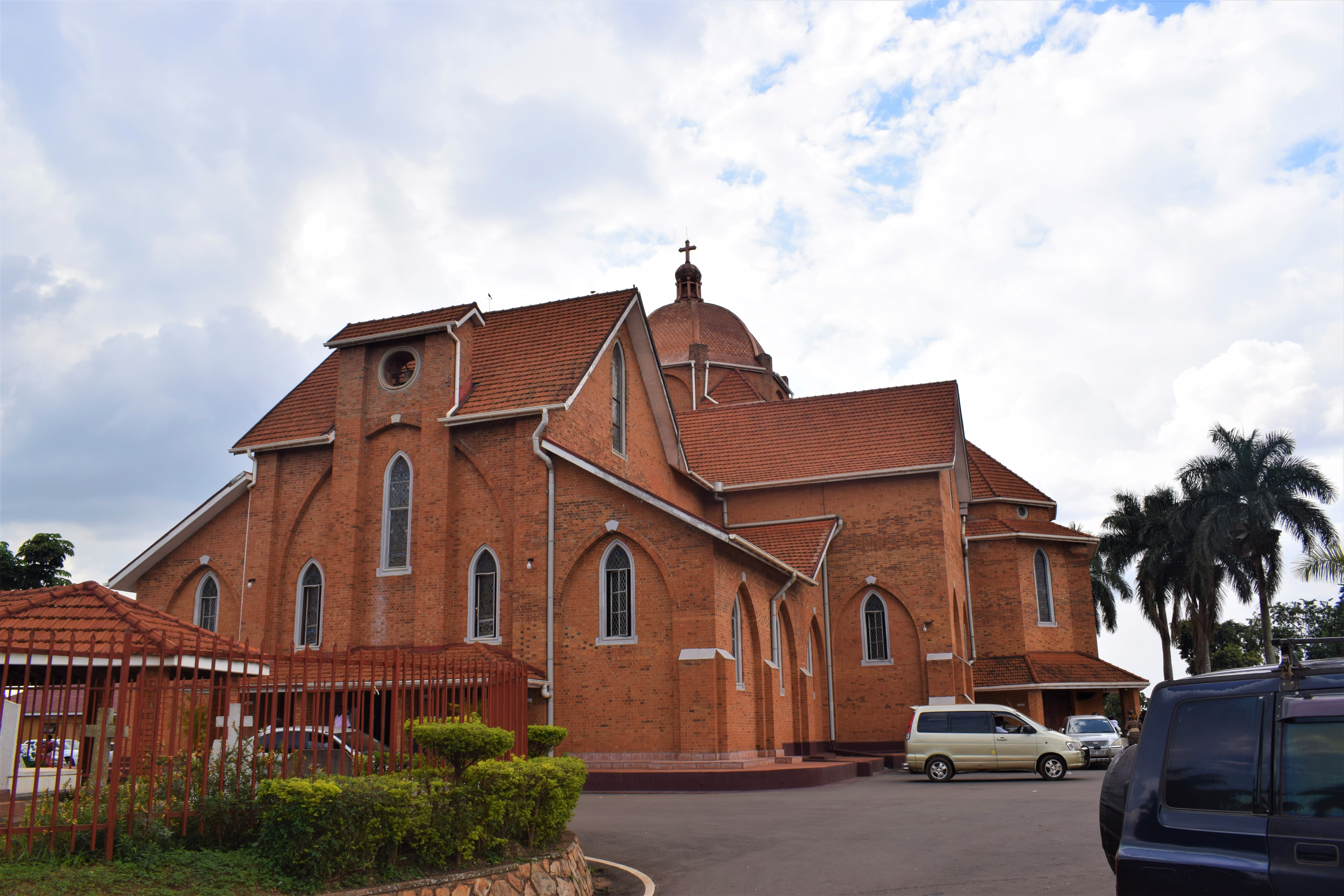
St. Paul's Anglican Cathedral in the capital Kampala

According to the national census of 2014, Christians of all denominations comprised 85 percent of Uganda's population. The Catholic Church had the largest number of adherents (39.3 percent of the total population). The largest Protestant church was the Anglican Church of Uganda, a part of the worldwide Anglican communion, at 32 percent. The category of Pentecostal/Evangelical/Born Again made up 11.1% of the population, while Seventh-day Adventists made up 1.7%, Baptists 0.3% and Eastern Orthodox 0.1%.

Jehovah's Witnesses operate in Uganda under the International Bible Students Association name and are working in a total of ten languages, including Swahili and Luganda. Followers of William M. Branham and Branhamism claim numbers in the tens of thousands, thanks in large part to translation and distribution efforts by Voice of God Recordings.

The Presbyterian Church in Uganda has 100-200 congregations. The Reformed Presbyterian Church in Uganda was a result in a split in the Presbyterian church.

The United Apostolic Church of Uganda, a Pentecostal denomination affiliated with the UPCI, has 424,739 constituents in 654 churches.

The Baptist movement has its origins in American mission of the Southern Baptist Convention in 1963. The Baptist Union of Uganda was founded in 1974. According to a denomination census released in 2020, it claimed 1,800 churches and 550,000 members.

The Church of Jesus Christ of Latter-day Saints claims more than 14,000 members in 27 congregations in Uganda. They also have two family history centers.

The Society of Friends has two yearly meetings, Uganda Yearly Meeting, part of Friends United Meeting and Evangelical Friends Church. There were about 3,000 members between the two in 2001.

A 2015 study estimated some 35,000 believers in Christ from a Muslim background residing in the country at the time. In 2020, 52% of Ugandans were Anglican and Evangelical.

== Islam ==
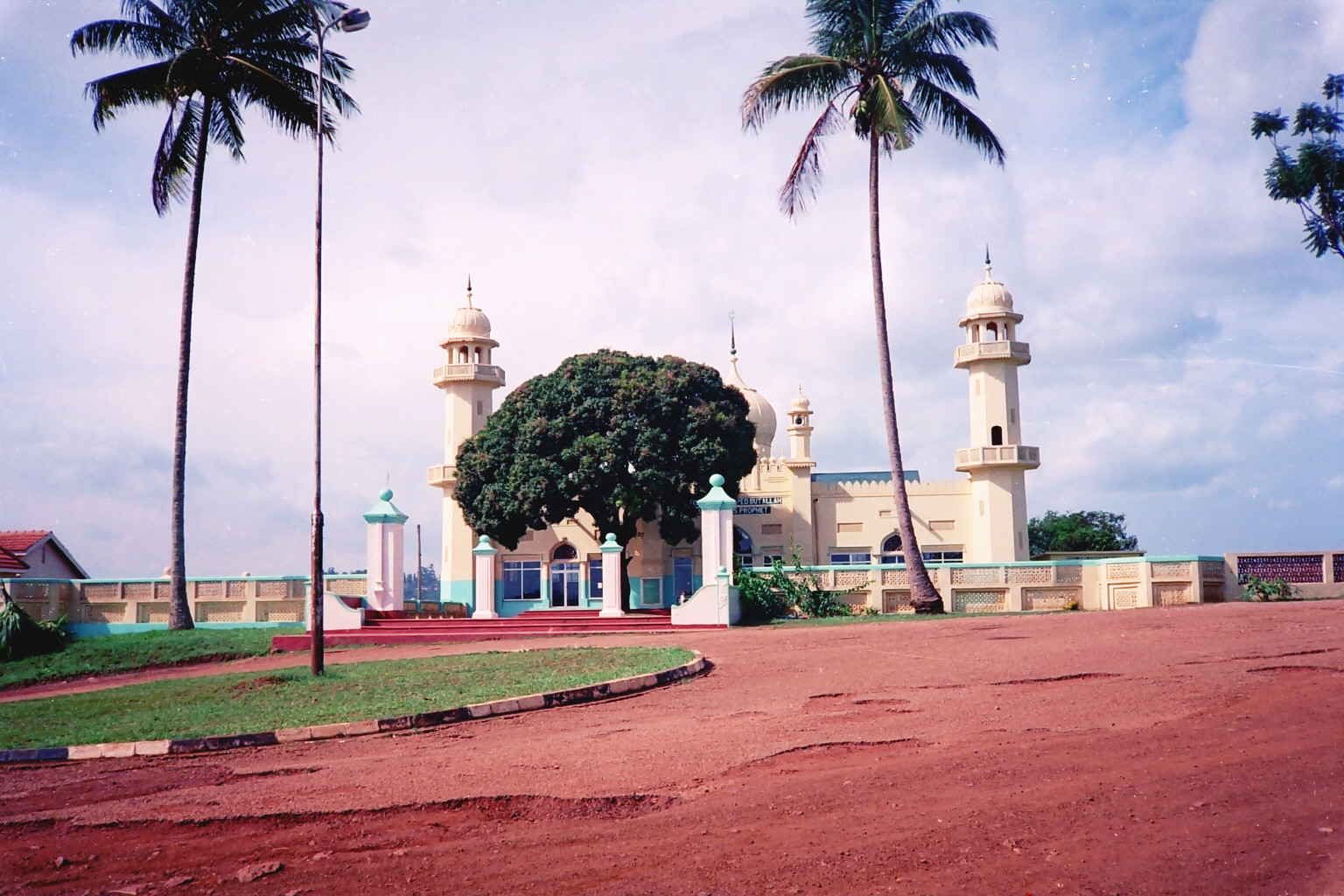
Kibuli mosque in Kampala, Uganda

According to the 2014 National Census, 14 percent of Ugandans adhered to Islam. Most Muslims are Sunni, with a small minority of Shia Muslims. There was a small group of Ahmadis in the country in 2012.

== Judaism ==
There are a small community of Ugandan Jews called the Abayudaya, numbering some 2,000-3,000. The group was formed by Semei Kakungulu in the early 20th century.

== Indigenous beliefs ==
About 1 percent of Uganda's population follow traditional religions only; however, in 2009, more people practiced traditional religious practices along with other religions such as Christianity or Islam. One survey in 2010 showed that about 27 percent of Ugandans believe that sacrifices to ancestors or spirits can protect them from harm.

== Interfaith ==
Uganda has received media attention for interfaith efforts in Mbale. Founded by JJ Keki, the Mirembe Kawomera (Delicious Peace) Fair Trade Coffee Cooperative brings together Muslim, Jewish, and Christian coffee farmers. Members of the cooperative use music to spread their message of peace. The Smithsonian Folkways album "Delicious Peace: Coffee, Music & Interfaith Harmony in Uganda" features songs from members of the cooperative about their interfaith message.

== Hinduism ==
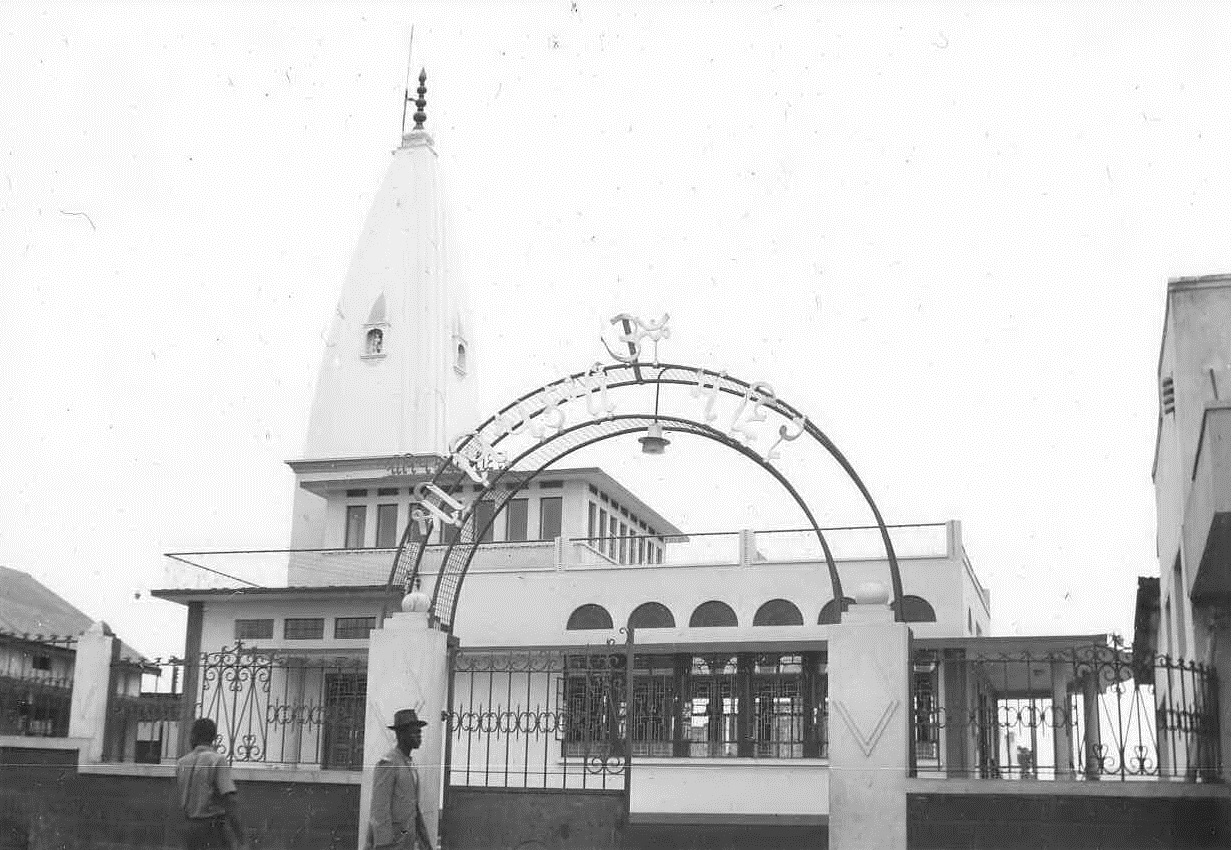
A temple in Jinja.

The 2014 Census found that there were 13,905 Hindus, making up less than 0.1% of the population.

== Baháʼí Faith ==
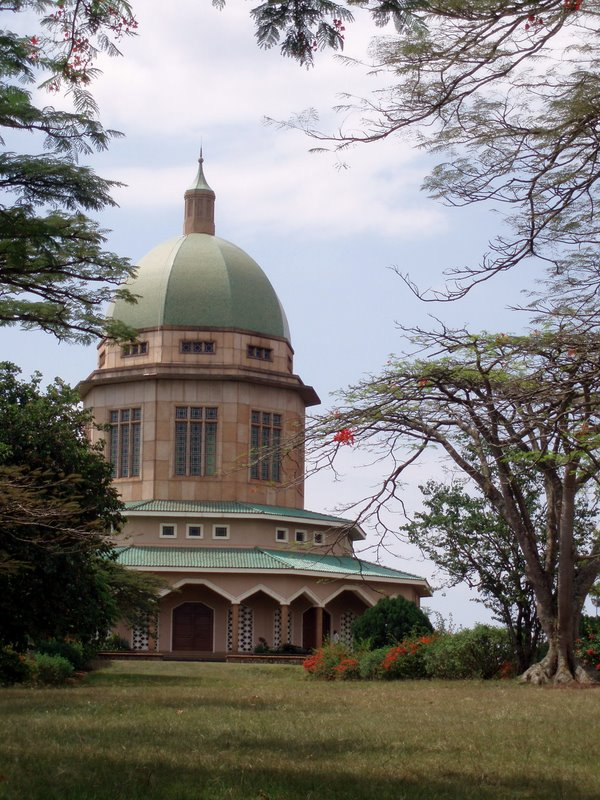
Baháʼí House of Worship in Kampala

The Baháʼí Faith in Uganda started to grow in 1951 and in four years time there were 500 Baháʼís in 80 localities, including 13 Baháʼí Local Spiritual Assemblies, representing 30 tribes, and had dispatched 9 Baháʼí pioneers to other African locations. Following the reign of Idi Amin when the Baháʼí Faith was banned and the murder of Baháʼí Hand of the Cause Enoch Olinga and his family, the community continues to grow though estimates of the population range widely from 19,000 to 105,000 and the community's involvements have included diverse efforts to promote the welfare of the Ugandan people. One of only ten Baháʼí Houses of Worship in the world, known as the Mother Temple of Africa, is located on the outskirts of Kampala.

== Buddhism ==
The Uganda Buddhist Centre, founded in 2005 by Venerable Buddharakkhita, is an initiative that intends to provide the first stable source of Buddhism in Uganda.

== No religion ==
Only 0.2 percent of Ugandans claim no religion. The Uganda Humanist Association is a member of the International Humanist and Ethical Union and has been registered since 1996.

== See also ==
- Judaism in Uganda
- Holy Spirit Movement
- Movement for the Restoration of the Ten Commandments of God
