= Free Reformed Churches of Australia =

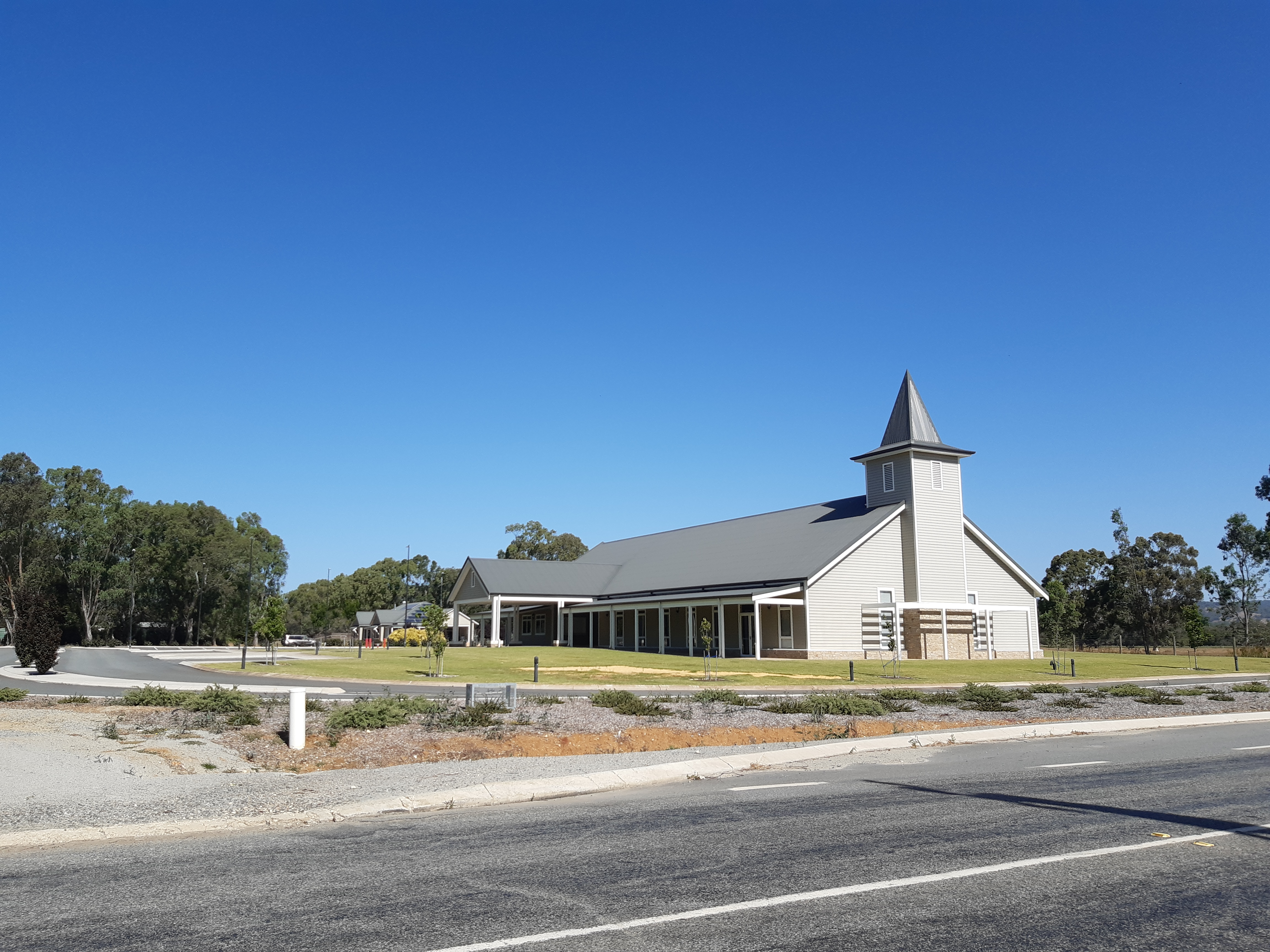
- The Free Reformed Church at Mundijong, Western Australia
- Classification: Protestant
- Orientation: Reformed
- Origin: 1951
- Congregations: 20
- Members: 5,000
- Official website: frca.org.au

The Free Reformed Churches of Australia (FRCA) are a federation of 20 congregations, 17 in Western Australia, 2 in Tasmania and a home-congregation in Cairns. At the start of 2016 the total membership was 4,663. Their historical roots are in the Reformed Churches of the Netherlands (Liberated) as a result of post-World War II immigration, and their doctrinal roots are in the sixteenth-century Protestant Reformation and the Bible. The first congregation was in Armadale, Western Australia, founded in 1951.

== Doctrine ==
As a confessional church, the churches subscribe to the Three Forms of Unity: Canons of Dort, Belgic Confession and the Heidelberg Catechism. The churches submit to the following three creeds as summaries of the faith: The Apostles Creed, The Nicene Creed, and The Athanasian Creed. Subscribing to Reformed Christianity, the church follows the Five Points of Calvinism.

== Churches ==
The FRCA has the following churches in Western Australia, in order of institution:

- Armadale - instituted 24 June 1951
- Albany - instituted 14 December 1952
- Kelmscott (daughter of Armadale) - instituted 1 January 1981
- Byford (daughter of Armadale) - instituted 27 January 1985
- Mount Nasura (formerly known as Bedfordale; daughter of Kelmscott) - instituted 1 December 1987
- Rockingham (daughter of Byford) - instituted 6 September 1992
- West Albany (daughter of Albany) - instituted 6 August 1994
- Southern River (formerly known as West Kelmscott; daughter of Kelmscott) - instituted 29 November 1998
- Bunbury - instituted 25 November 2001
- Darling Downs (daughter of Byford and Armadale) - instituted 6 July 2003
- Baldivis (daughter of Rockingham) - instituted 1 July 2007
- Mundijong (daughter of Byford) - instituted 6 December 2009
- Busselton (daughter of Bunbury) - instituted 27 March 2011
- Melville (daughter of Southern River) - instituted 2 February 2014
- Cardup Brook (daughter of Byford and Mundijong) - instituted 25 June 2023
- Comet Bay (daughter of Baldivis) - instituted 2 July 2023
- Seville Grove (daughter of Southern River and Kelmscott) - instituted 6 October 2024
- There is a home-congregation in Cairns, Queensland, overseen by Armadale.

and the following churches in Tasmania:

- Launceston - instituted 15 February 1953
- Legana (daughter of Launceston) - instituted 4 December 1988

== Sister relationships ==
The Free Reformed Churches of Australia have sister-church relationships with

- Canadian and American Reformed Churches
- Free Reformed Churches of South Africa (Die Vrye Gereformeerde Kerke in Suid-Afrika,)
- Presbyterian Church in Korea (Koshin)
- Reformed Churches in Indonesia (Gereja Gereja Reformasi di Indonesia, NTT)
- Reformed Churches of New Zealand
- First Evangelical Reformed Church of Singapore

A long-standing sister church relation with the Reformed Churches of the Netherlands (Liberated) (Gereformeerde Kerken vrijgemaakt) was terminated at FRCA Synod Bunbury in June 2018.

== Mission ==
Their local churches are actively engaged in mission work in several locations in Asia and the Pacific, including Papua New Guinea and Indonesia. They have particularly close ties with the Canadian and American Reformed Churches, and many of their ministers have received their theological training at the Canadian Reformed Theological Seminary.

== See also ==
- List of Presbyterian and Reformed denominations in Australia
