= Sister church =

Term used in 20th-century ecclesiology

Sister churches was a term used in 20th-century ecclesiology to describe ecumenical relations between the Roman Catholic Church and the Eastern Orthodox Churches, and more rarely and unofficially, between the Roman Catholic Church and the Anglican communion. The Catholic Church has since called on theologians to avoid the term, clarifying that "one cannot properly say that the Catholic Church is 'sister' of a particular Church or group of Churches. This is not merely a question of terminology, but above all of respecting a basic truth of the Catholic faith: that of the unicity [uniqueness] of the [Catholic Church]." The term is also currently used among Protestants to refer to different denominations of the same religious tradition.

== Use in the 12th century ==
The expression, allegedly in use among the Orthodox since the fifth century among the "patriarchal sister Churches", appeared in written form in two letters of the Metropolitan Nicetas of Nicomedia (1136) and the Patriarch John Camaterus (in office from 1198 to 1206), in which they protested that Rome, by presenting herself as mother and teacher, would annul their authority. In their view, Rome was only the first among sister churches of equal dignity, see first among equals. According to this idea of Pentarchy, there are five Patriarchs at the head of the Church, with the Church of Rome having the first place of honor among these patriarchal sister churches. According to the Congregation for the Doctrine of the Faith, however, no Roman pontiff ever recognised this Orthodox equalization of the sees or accepted that only a primacy of honor be accorded to the See of Rome.

== Second Vatican Council ==
In modern times, the expression "sister Churches" first appeared in Pope John XXIII's letters to the Orthodox Patriarch of Constantinople, Athenagoras I. In his letters, the pope expressed the hope of seeing the unity between the sister churches re-established in the near future. Later the term appeared in a "Joint Declaration" between Pope Paul VI and Patriarch Athenagoras in 1965, representing their respective sees, Rome and Constantinople, respectively.

The Second Vatican Council adopted the expression "sister Churches" to describe the relationship between particular Churches: "in the East there flourish many particular local Churches; among them the patriarchal Churches hold first place, and of these, many glory in taking their origins from the apostles themselves. Therefore, there prevailed and still prevails among Eastern Christians an eager desire to perpetuate in a communion of faith and charity those family ties which ought to exist between local Churches, as between sisters."

The first papal document in which the term "sister Churches" is applied to the Churches is the apostolic brief, "Anno ineunte," of Paul VI to the Patriarch Athenagoras I. After having indicated his willingness to do everything possible to "re-establish full communion between the Church of the West and that of the East", the Pope asked: "Since this mystery of divine love is at work in every local Church, is not this the reason for the traditional expression 'sister Churches', which the Churches of various places used for one another?"

== John Paul II ==
More recently, John Paul II often used the term, especially in three principal documents:

1. The encyclical Slavorum Apostoli, in which he states that
  For us they [Saints Cyril and Methodius] are the champions and also the patrons of the ecumenical endeavour of the sister Churches of East and West, for the rediscovery through prayer and dialogue of visible unity in perfect and total communion
2. In a letter dated 31 May 1991 to the bishops of Europe:
  Hence, with these Churches [the Orthodox Churches] the relations are to be fostered as between sister Churches, to use the expression of Pope Paul VI in his brief to the Patriarch of Constantinople, Athenagoras I, and
3. In the encyclical Ut Unum Sint, in which he says
  Following the Second Vatican Council and in the light of earlier tradition, it has again become usual to refer to the particular or local Churches gathered around their bishop as 'sister Churches'. In addition, the lifting of mutual excommunications, by eliminating a painful canonical and psychological obstacle, was a very significant step on the way toward full communion.
  In paragraph 60 of this encyclical, he states:
  More recently, the joint international commission took a significant step forward with regard to the very sensitive question of the method to be followed in re-establishing full communion between the Catholic Church and the Orthodox Church, an issue which has frequently embittered relations between Catholics and Orthodox. The commission has laid the doctrinal foundations for a positive solution to this problem on the basis of the doctrine of sister Churches.

== Ecclesiastical directives ==
A 2000 document of the Congregation for the Doctrine of the Faith gave the following directives on the use of the expression "sister churches":

The historical references presented in the preceding paragraphs illustrate the significance which the expression 'sister Churches' has assumed in the ecumenical dialogue. This makes the correct theological use of the term even more important.

In fact, in the proper sense, 'sister Churches' are exclusively particular Churches (or groupings of particular Churches; for example, the patriarchates or metropolitan provinces) among themselves. It must always be clear, when the expression 'sister Churches' is used in this proper sense, that the one, holy, Catholic, and apostolic Universal Church is not 'sister' but 'mother' of all the particular Churches. However, as recalled above, one cannot properly say that the Catholic Church is 'sister' of a particular Church or group of Churches. This is not merely a question of terminology, but above all of respecting a basic truth of the Catholic faith: that of the unicity [uniqueness] of the Church of Jesus Christ. In fact, there is but a single Church, and therefore the plural term "Churches" can refer only to particular Churches.

Consequently, one should avoid, as a source of misunderstanding and theological confusion, the use of formulations such as 'our two Churches,' which, if applied to the Catholic Church and the totality of Orthodox Churches (or to a single Orthodox Church), imply a plurality not merely on the level of particular Churches, but also on the level of the one, holy, Catholic, and apostolic Church confessed in the Creed, whose real existence is thus obscured.

Finally, it must also be borne in mind that the expression 'sister Churches' in the proper sense, as attested by the common Tradition of East and West, may only be used for those ecclesial communities that have preserved a valid episcopate and Eucharist [i.e., as indicated in beginning of document, it is 'improperly applied' when referring to 'the Anglican Communion and non-Catholic ecclesial communities'].

== Usage with regard to the Anglican communion ==
Pope Paul VI was a good friend of the Anglican Church, which he described as "our beloved sister Church" in ecumenical meetings with Anglican leaders. However, the use of this term to describe the Anglican Church, even unofficially, was later rejected by Pope John Paul II and Cardinal Joseph Ratzinger in the document Dominus Iesus, because of lingering doubts regarding the validity of Anglican orders and the consequent apostolic succession of Anglican bishops and ministers, among other things.

In a speech to Anglican bishops, Cardinal Walter Kasper noted that "a final solution [to recognition of Anglican orders] can be found only in the larger context of full communion in faith, sacramental life and shared apostolic vision." He specifically mentioned obstacles like "lay presidency, the ordination of women, and ethical problems such as abortion and homosexual partnerships." See Paul Handley, "Churches' goal is unity, not uniformity spokesman for Vatican declares,". This position seems to be in line with the posture of Orthodoxy towards Anglicanism. Kallistos Ware notes: "For Orthodoxy, the validity of ordinations does not depend simply on the fulfillment of certain technical conditions (external possession of the apostolic succession; correct form, matter and intention).

The Catholic Church seems to be of the same mind concerning broader and "more substantive" criteria (not merely "the fulfillment of technical conditions") necessary for recognition of Anglican orders. Even Pope Paul VI, given his openness to Anglicans, did not revoke Apostolicae curae, which declares Anglican orders to be "absolutely null and utterly void". According to Rosemary Radford Ruether, it unhappily suggests that the "only ecumenism" that "counts" is "between Rome and Constantinople", though Anglicans, a second millennium church, "yearn to get into the 'old boys' club' of patriarchs."

== In Protestantism ==
Different denominations of the same religious tradition are often said to have "sister church" relationships, especially if they are in different countries. For example, a sister church relationship exists between the Free Reformed Churches of Australia, the Reformed Churches in the Netherlands (Liberated), the Canadian and American Reformed Churches and the Free Reformed Churches of South Africa. This relationship includes mutual recognition of the eligibility of ministers.

The Lutheran Church–Missouri Synod has a policy of closed communion, which means the Eucharist ordinarily shared only with those who are baptized and confirmed members of one of the congregations of LCMS or of a congregation of one of her sister churches with whom she has formally declared altar and pulpit fellowship (i.e., agreement in all articles of doctrine). Most members of the International Lutheran Council are LCMS sister churches.

== See also ==
- Mother Church
