= Presbyterian Church in Uganda =

Reformed Calvinistic denomination in Uganda

- Classification: Protestant
- Theology: Reformed Calvinist
- Polity: Presbyterian
- Leader: James Yiga and Kefa Sempangi
- Associations: World Reformed Fellowship
- Region: Uganda
- Founder: Kefa Sempangi
- Origin: 1979; Kampala, Uganda
- Separations: Reformed Presbyterian Church in Uganda
- Congregations: 100-200
- Members: Unknown
- Hospitals: 1
- Primary schools: 3

Presbyterian Church in Uganda is a conservative Reformed Calvinistic denomination in Uganda with almost 100 churches in 5 presbyteries in the late 2000s.

== Origin ==
The Presbyterian Church in Uganda was founded in the 1970s by the Ugandan pastor Keefa Sempangi, who had pastored that time a large Pentecostal church in Kampala, the Redeemed Church, he was a member of the Parliament in that time. In 1973 Kefa Sempangi had to emigrate, because of the persecution of Idi Amin. He settled in the Netherlands, where he had been introduced the Reformed faith. Later he was invited to study in the United States and become a student of the Westminster Theological Seminary in Philadelphia, Pennsylvania.

He returned home in 1979 with the help of American missionaries and began to start the Presbyterian church. The first church was organised in that year in Kampala, Uganda; this was the First Presbyterian Church in Kampala, Uganda. The church organised Westminster Theological Seminary in Uganda to train and equip national pastors. A split occurred in the church in 1989 when the Reformed Presbyterian Church in Uganda was formed.

The PCU founding congregations across Uganda, the number of churches and members are growing rapidly. The church is a member of the World Reformed Fellowship. There have been mission projects in Central Uganda, and across the country.

The Orthodox Presbyterian Church (USA) begun work in Mbale, Uganda since 1995, and later the mission moved to Karamoja. The Orthodox Presbyterian Churches in Mbele holds provisional membership in the PCU, but they are full incorporated as Mbale Presbytery.

== Structure ==
The church has Presbyterian government. In the local level there is the congregation with teaching elders, ruling elders and deacons, the presbytery is the middle governing body, currently there are Semuliki Presbytery, Kapchorwa presbytery, Gulu, Kampala, Central, Mbale presbyteries and Rwenzori and Eastern presbyteries are in dialogue to integrate into the Presbyterian Church in Uganda.

The General Assembly is the highest level of government. The church maintains its headquarters in Kampala, Uganda.

== Theology ==
The Presbyterian Church in Uganda is theologically Reformed church, that subscribes the historic creeds:

- Apostles Creed
- Westminster Confession of Faith
- Westminster Shorter Catechism
- Westminster Larger Catechism

Reformed theology is

- Universal
- Evangelical
- God is Sovereign

God is initiates the Covenant of Grace

=== Five Points of Calvinism ===
- Total depravity
- Unconditional election
- Limited atonement
- Irresistible grace
- Perseverance of the saints

=== Solas of the Reformation ===
- Sola Scriptura
- Sola Fide
- Soli Deo Gloria
- Sola Gratia
- Solus Christus

== Education and seminary ==
Westminster Theological seminary and College begun in 1996 in the worship center of First Presbyterian Church in Kampala. First students were Ugandan. Classes begun in Zana in 1998. Student number grew rapidly. Students from Sudan begun to come in 1999. New facilities were built A seminary was founded in 2007. The Seminary is the official theological institution of the Presbyterian Church in Uganda. It is located now in Kampala, Uganda.

== Relationship with other Reformed churches ==
The Presbyterian Church in Uganda has fraternal relations with the Reformed Churches in the Netherlands (Liberated) through the Reformed Mission Utrecht. and the Presbyterian Church in America through the Mission to the World.

== See also ==
- Religion in Uganda
