= Christian Evangelical Church in Timor =

Protestant church in Indonesia

- Indonesian: Gereja Masehi Injili di Timor - GMIT
- Abbreviation: CECT
- Classification: Protestantism
- Theology: Calvinism Tradition
- Polity: Presbyterian polity
- Administration: Synod Assembly
- Synod Assemblies Chairwomen: Rev. Semuel Benyamin Pandie, S.Th.
- Synod Assemblies Secretary: Rev. Lay Abdi Karya Wenyi, M.Si.
- Associations: Communion of Churches in Indonesia; World Communion of Reformed Churches; World Council of Churches
- Region: Eastern Southeast Archipelago Province (except Sumba Island) and Sumbawa Island in Western Southeast Archipelago Province, Indonesia
- Headquarters: CECT Assembly Office Building, S. K. Lerik Street, Kupang City 85228
- Origin: Oct 31, 1947; Syalom Airnona Church
- Absorbed: Protestant Church in Indonesia
- Members: 850.000 (2012)
- Official website: https://sinodegmit.or.id

Christian Evangelical Church in Timor is the second largest Protestant church in Indonesia with 2 million members and 2,161 congregations and almost 1,100 ministers. The Christian Evangelical Church in Timor belongs to the Reformed family of Protestantism. Despite its name, the church spreads across the Eastern Indonesian provinces. The church ministers in culturally diverse and poor areas.

== History ==
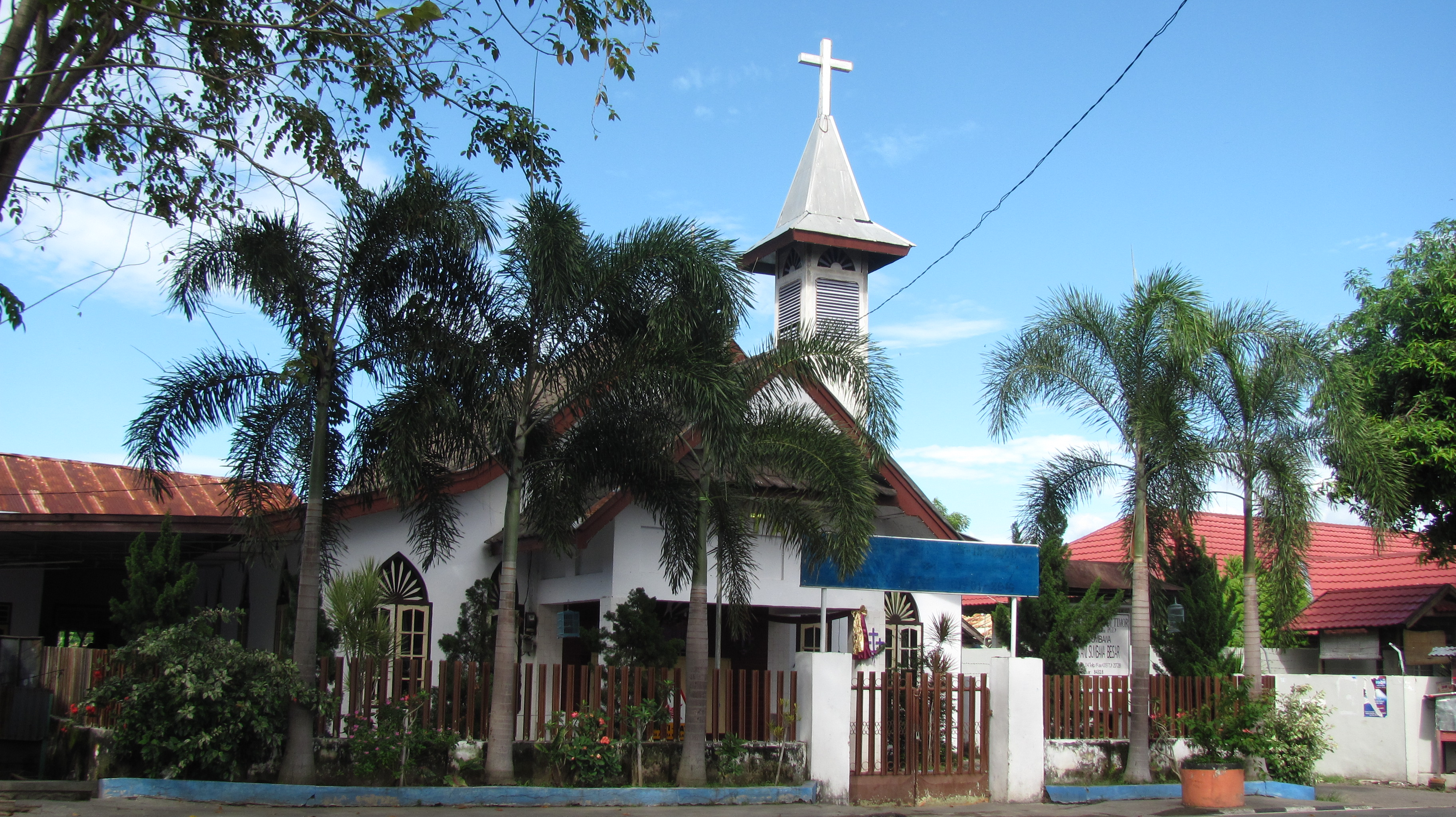
Christian Evangelical Church in Timor in Sumbawa Besar, Island of Sumbawa

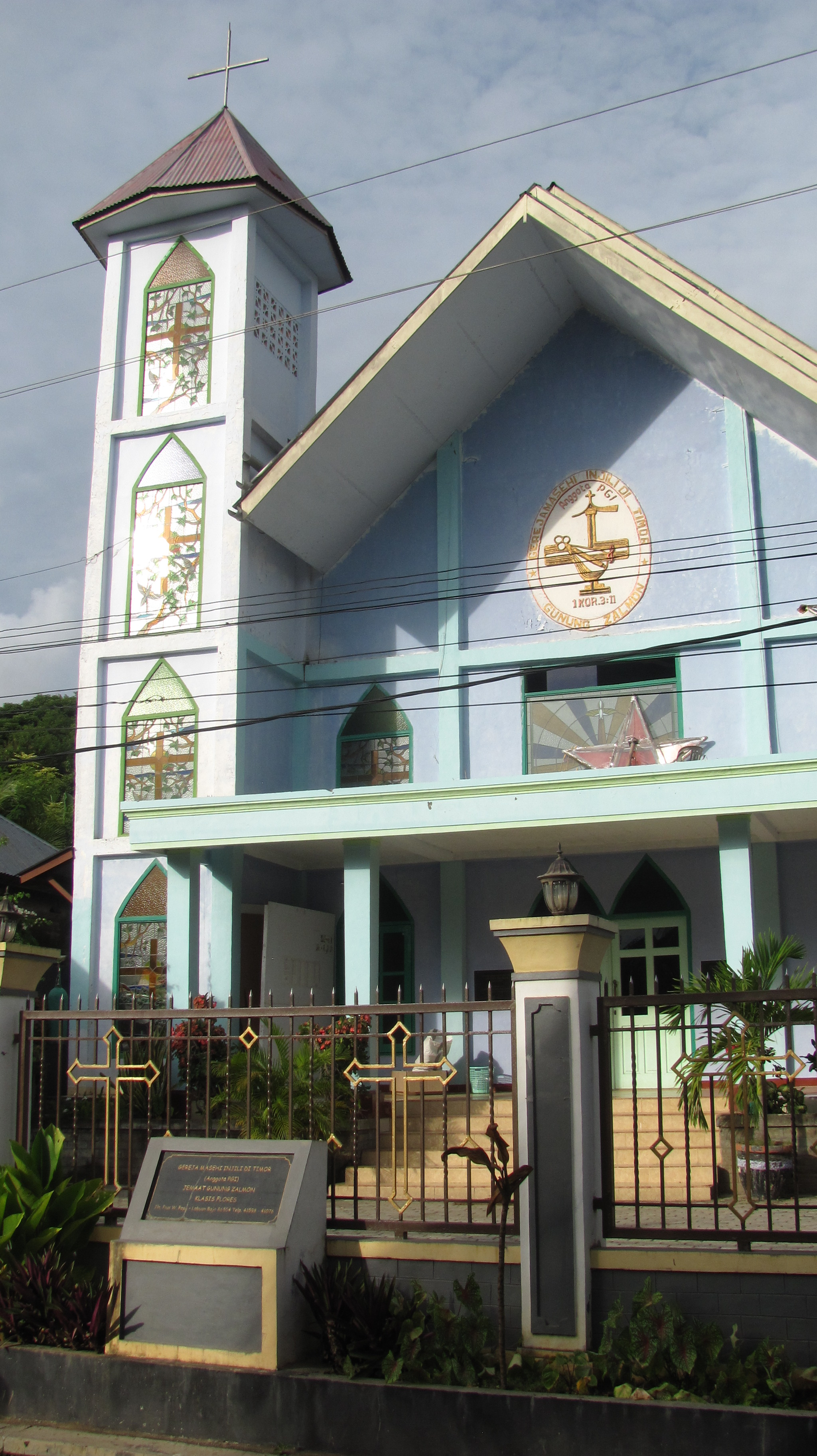
Christian Evangelical Church in Timor in di Labuan Bajo, Island of Flores

The first Dutch minister arrived in 1621. However, there was no continuous ministry until 1821. The Netherland Missionary Society was active between 1821 and 1863. It developed slowly. The denomination spread to Roti and Sawu. The Dutch Church the Indische Kerk took over administration after 1863.

The church grew steadily in the 1920s as Dutch missionaries helped to develop the church. In the 1930s the church grow rapidly and expanded into the interior regions of Timor and Alor. It became autonomous in 1947 and had 223,000 members and 320 congregations. The church's expansion in this region stemmed from the issue of training of pastors being solved.

== Theology ==
This church can be describe as a Reformed Church and adheres to Reformed Confessions.

It adheres to the:

- Apostles Creed
- Nicene Creed
- Athanasian Creed
- Heidelberg Catechism

== Interchurch relations ==
- World Communion of Reformed Churches
