= Piracicaba =

- Municipality
- Municipality of Piracicaba
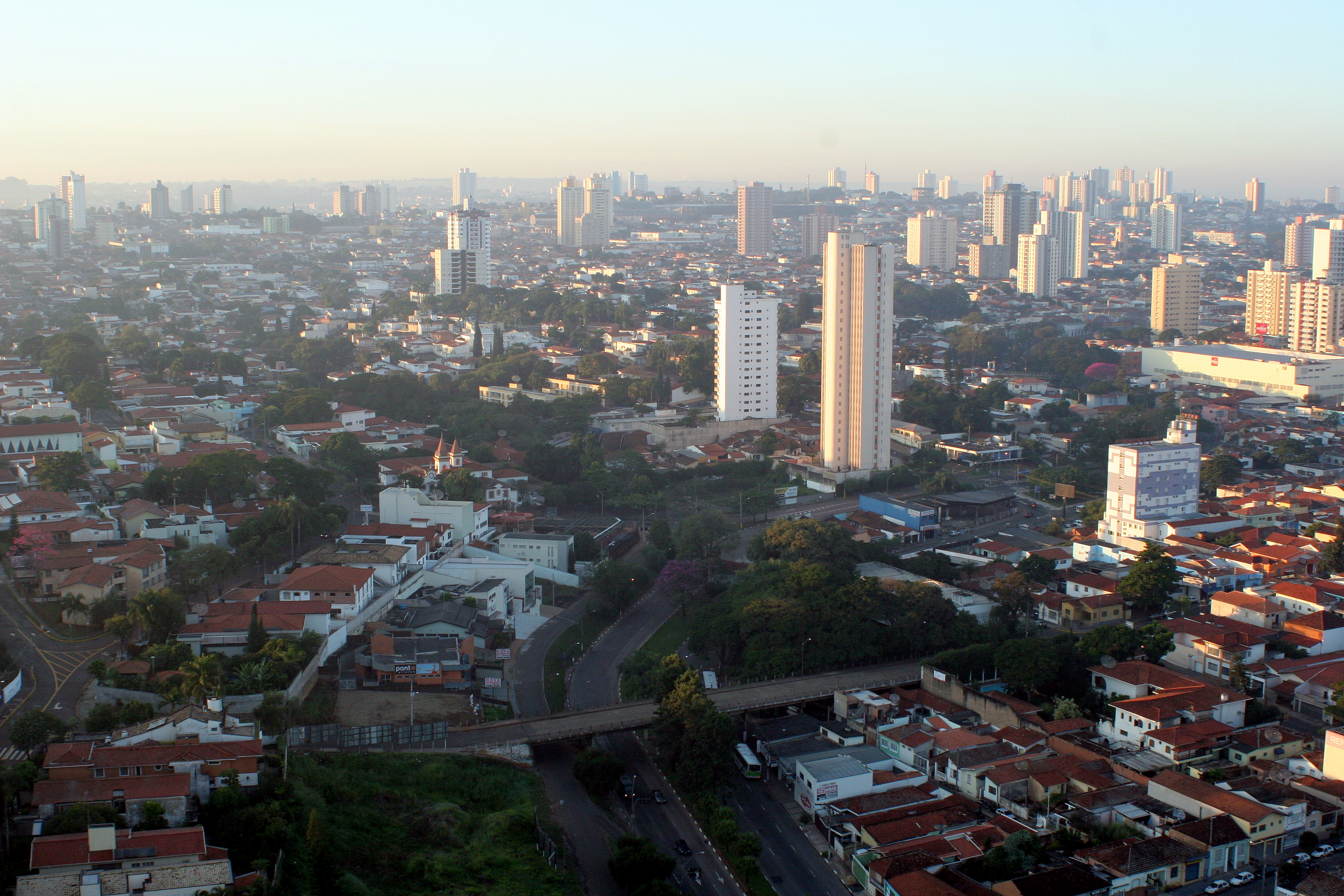
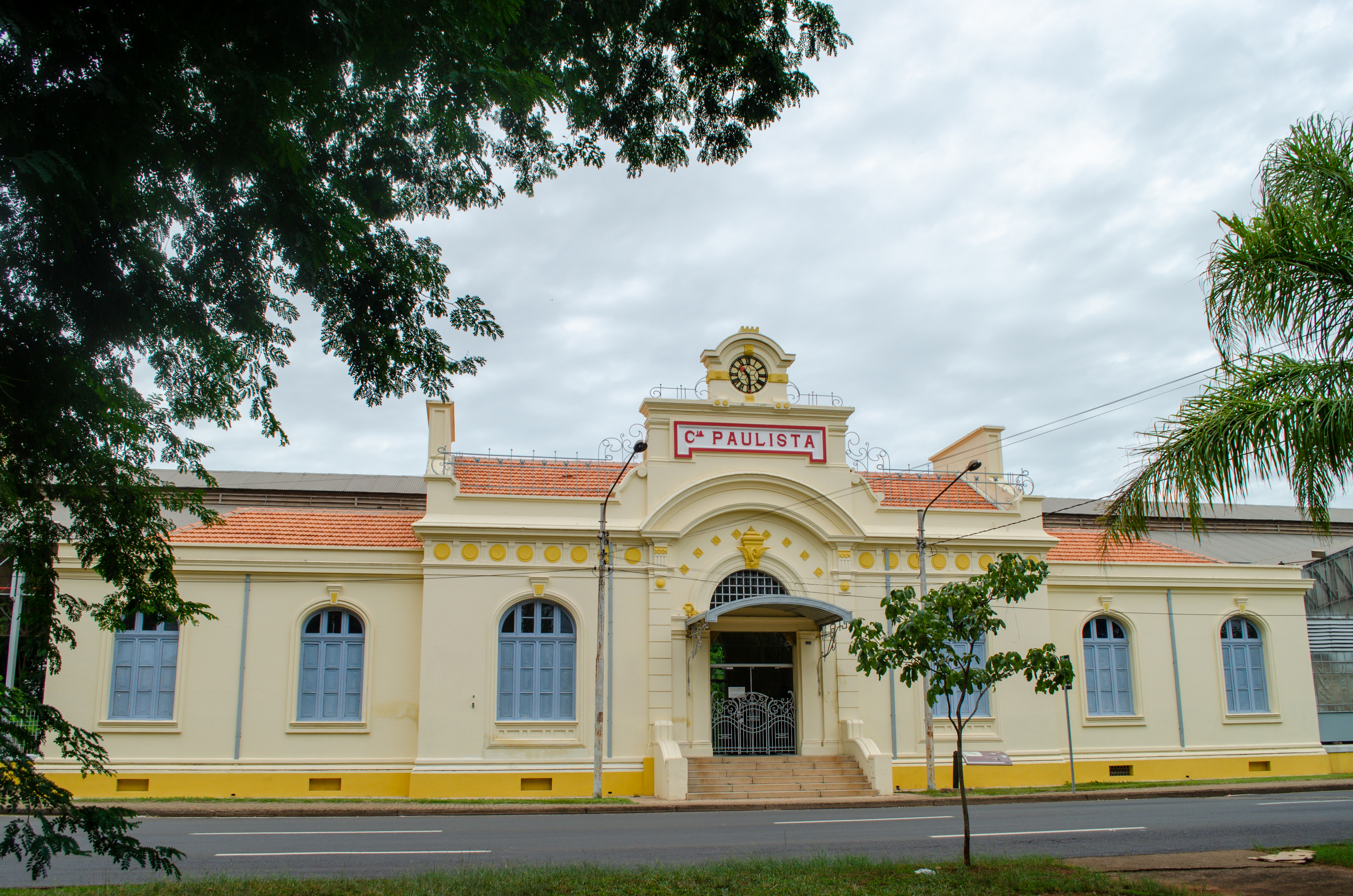
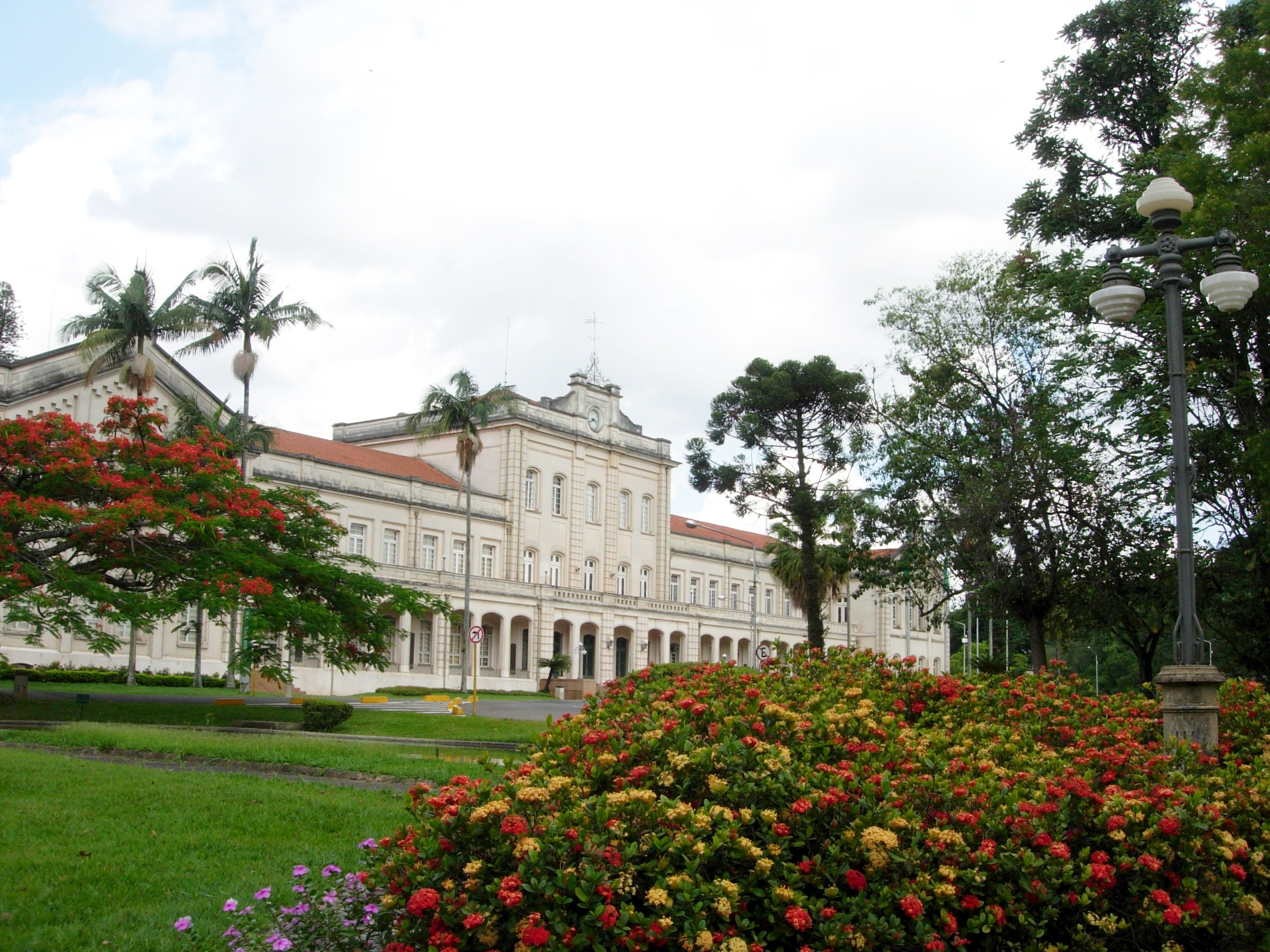
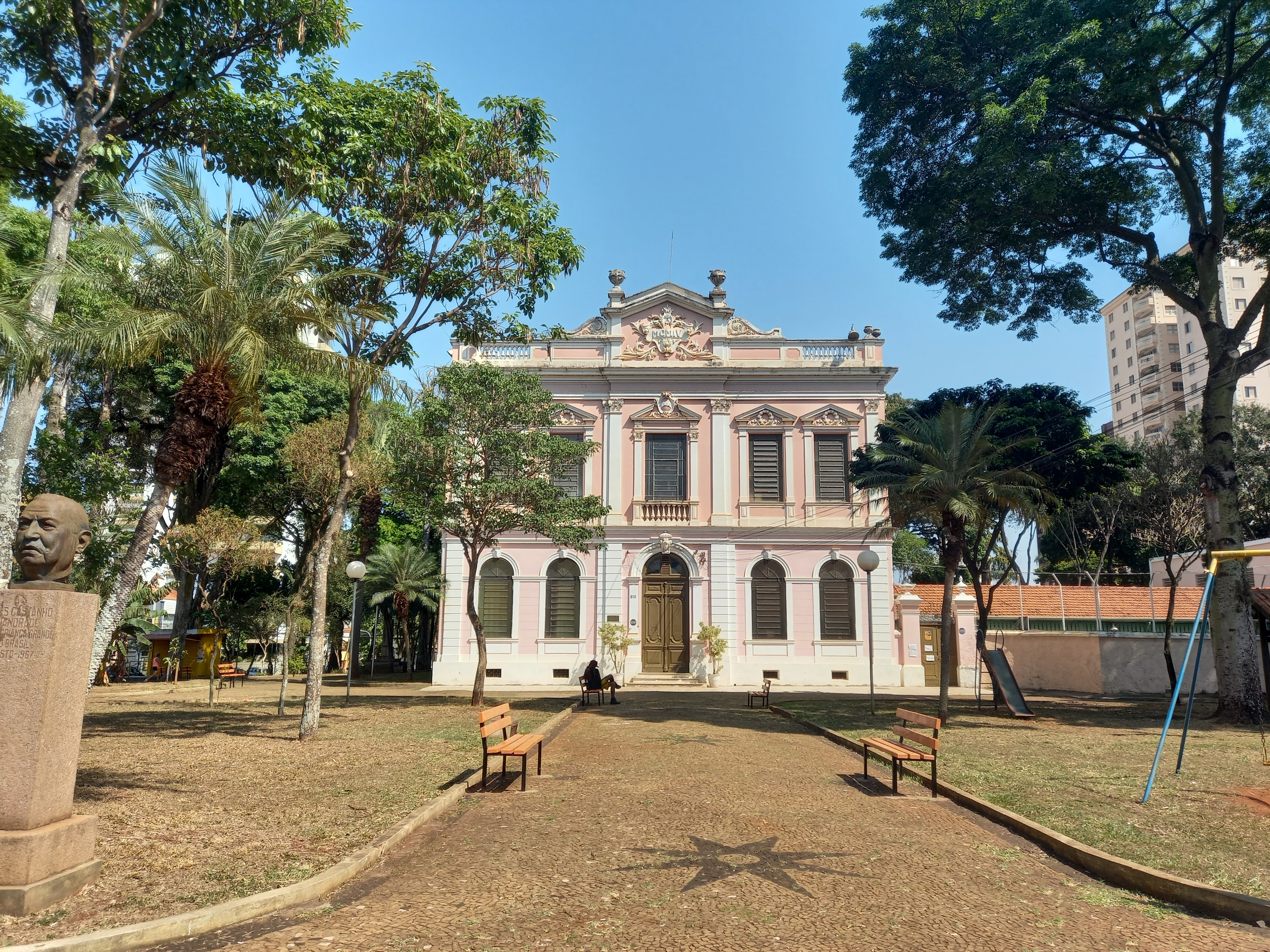
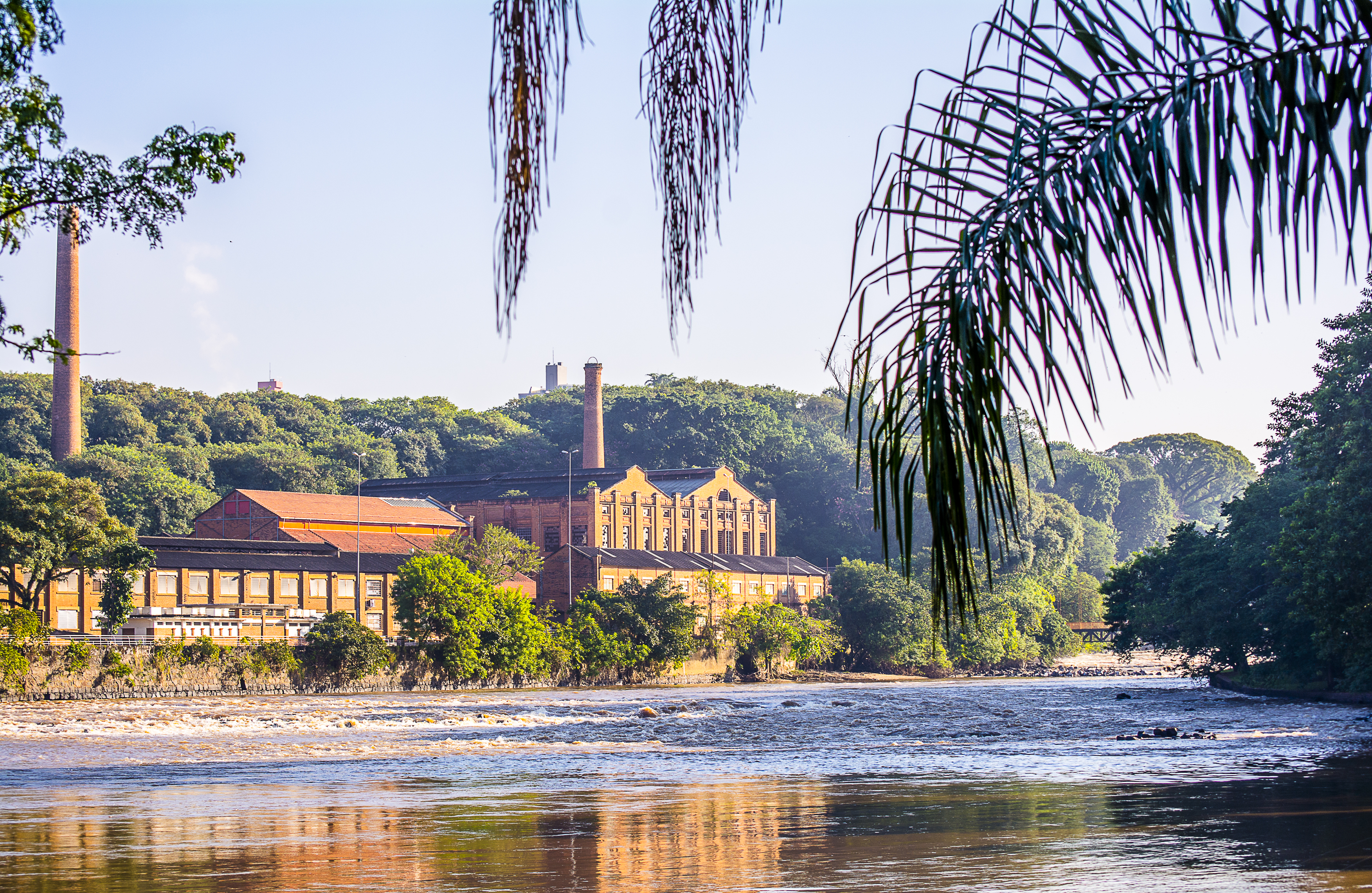
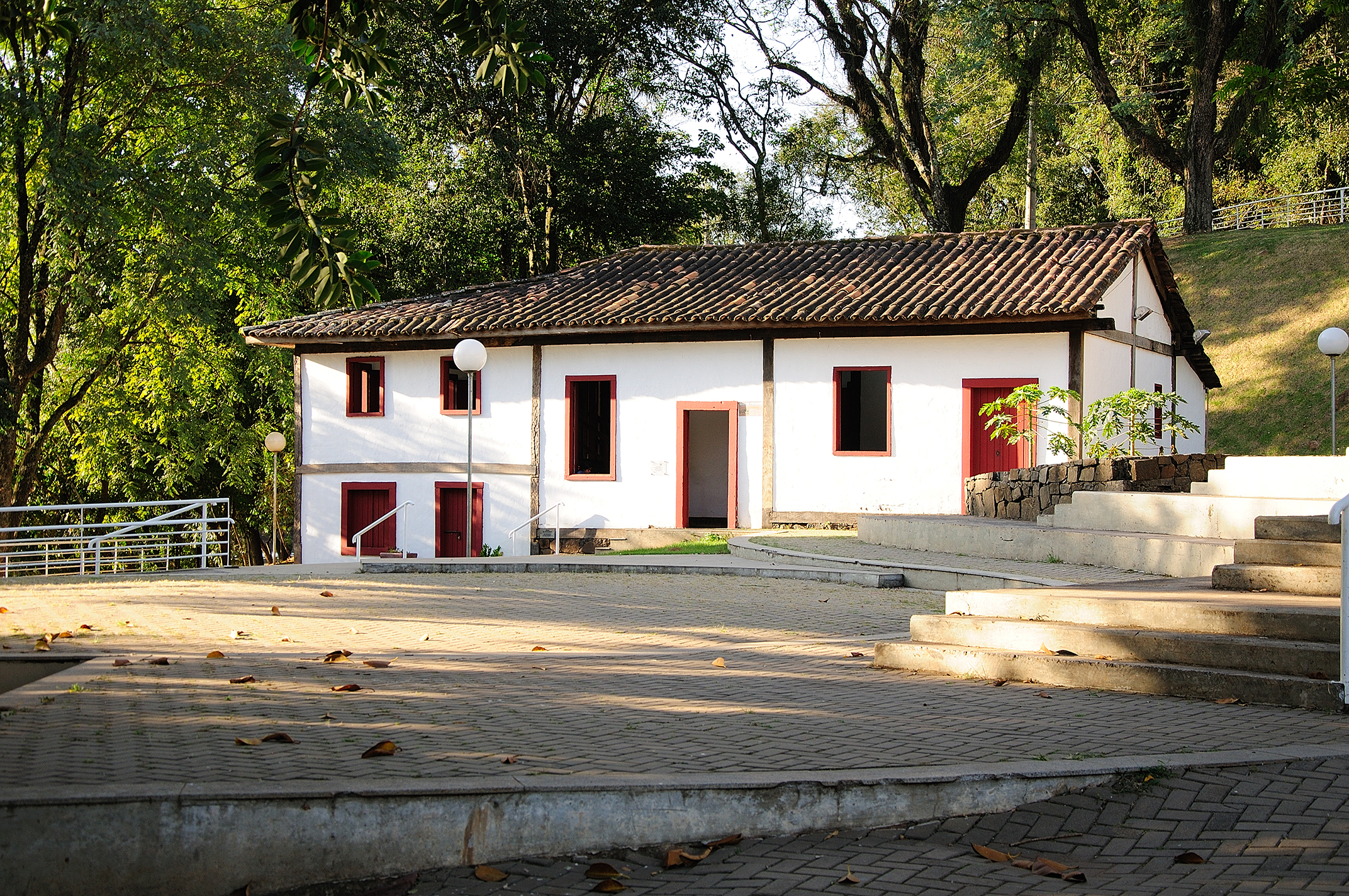
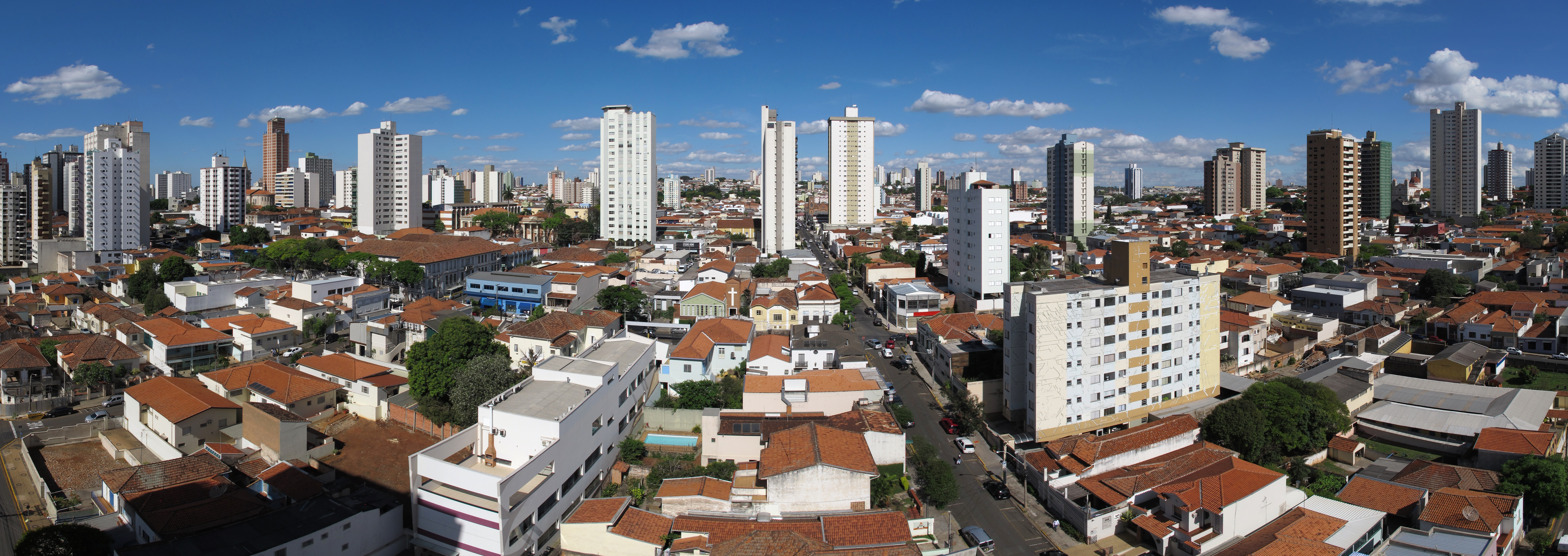

- Flag Coat of arms
- Motto: Audax in intellectu et in labore (Latin); Audacious in intelligence and at work
- Location in São Paulo
- Coordinates: 22°43′31″S 47°38′57″W
- Country: Brazil
- Region: Southeast
- State: São Paulo

Government
  - Mayor: Helinho Zanatta (PSD)

Area
  - Municipality: 1,378.07 km^{2} (532.08 sq mi)
  - Urban: 168.824 km^{2} (65.183 sq mi)
- Elevation: 554 m (1,818 ft)

Population (2022)
  - Municipality: 423,323
  - Estimate (2025): 440,835
  - Density: 318.4/km^{2} (825/sq mi)
- Demonym: Piracicabano
- Time zone: UTC-03:00 (BRT)
- Postal code: 13400-001 to 13439-999
- HDI: 0.785
- HDI rank: SP: 50th
- HDI year: UNDP/2010
- GDP: R$34,555,723.85 thousand
- GDP year: IBGE/2021
- GDP per capita: R$84,225.76
- GDP per capita year: IBGE/2021
- Patron saint: Saint Anthony
- Website: piracicaba.sp.gov.br

Piracicaba (Brazilian Portuguese: [piɾɐsiˈkabɐ] or [piˌɾasiˈkabɐ]) is a Brazilian municipality located in the interior of São Paulo state, in the Southeast Region of Brazil. It serves as the main city of the Metropolitan Region of Piracicaba (RMP) and is situated approximately 150 km (93 mi) northwest of the state capital, São Paulo. Covering an area of just over 1,378 km^{2} (532 sq mi), with around 169 km^{2} (65 sq mi) classified as urban area, Piracicaba has a population of 438,827 inhabitants, making it the 13th most populous municipality in São Paulo state.

Established in 1767 along the banks of the Piracicaba River, a vital water source for the region, Piracicaba saw significant agricultural development during the 19th century, particularly in sugarcane and coffee cultivation. However, the early 20th century brought economic decline due to the collapse of the coffee cycle and falling sugar prices, a situation that persisted until the onset of industrialization.

Piracicaba was among the first Brazilian cities to industrialize, with the establishment of factories in the metalworking and sugar production equipment sectors. This industrial activity expanded significantly in the 1970s with the Pró-Álcool program, which promoted the production of ethanol for automotive use in response to the 1973 global oil crisis. This initiative spurred substantial industrial growth in Piracicaba over subsequent decades, positioning it as the 34th largest GDP in Brazil in 2021. Today, it is a key industrial hub in the region and home to several universities.

Beyond its economic significance, Piracicaba is a prominent cultural center in its region. The Tupi Forest Reserve and Ártemis Spa are major environmental preservation areas, while Professor Phillipe Westin Park and parks along the Piracicaba River are notable urban attractions. The International Humor Exhibition of Piracicaba, held annually at the Central Mill, is one of the world's most significant cartoon events. The Central Mill, a former sugarcane mill, is now a protected historical and cultural site, serving as a venue for cultural, artistic, and recreational activities.

== Etymology ==
In Tupi: pirá sykaba. Syk means "to arrive". Thus, syk-aba means "place of arrival". This term is in a genitive relationship with pirá, meaning fish.

The name of the municipality derives from the Paulista General Language, meaning "the place where fish arrive," formed by combining the terms pirá ("fish"), syk ("arrive"), ab (a suffix indicating the place where something occurs), and -a (a nominalizing suffix). It refers to the rapids of the Piracicaba River, which obstruct the migration (piracema) of fish.

Notably, according to Eduardo Navarro in his Dicionário de Tupi Antigo (2013), the term originates from the General Language, a historical development of Old Tupi and thus more recent. In Old Tupi, syk meant arriving by land (arriving by water, as with fish, would be îepotar). The naming of Piracicaba in the 18th century aligns with the period when the General Language was spoken, rather than Old or Classical Tupi.

== History ==
=== Pre-colonial period ===
Thermoluminescence dating from archaeological sites between the Claro and Piracicaba rivers indicates continuous human occupation of the region for at least 8,000 years. These sites have yielded ancient stone tools, including hammerstones, scrapers, cores, and flakes, as well as numerous projectile points made from sandstone, quartz, and other rocks, typically associated with the Humaitá and Umbu cultures. The earliest Amerindian populations in the valleys of the Piracicaba and Corumbataí rivers subsisted on hunting, fishing, and gathering fruits, roots, and other foods. In total, thirteen pre-colonial archaeological sites have been identified within the current municipality, all featuring remnants of open-air villages, lithic workshops, and hunting camps.

Indigenous groups practicing agriculture and producing ceramics likely reached the Piracicaba region around the start of the Common Era, ancestors of the Tupi, Guarani, and Guaianá people, who spoke languages from the Tupi and Macro-Jê linguistic families, respectively. However, limited precise information about their lifestyles and customs has survived, as Europeans often failed to discern ethnic distinctions among indigenous groups. Some sources mention the Payaguá and Kayapo as possible inhabitants of the Piracicaba River valley. The passage of expeditions of bandeirantes through the region led to numerous conflicts with indigenous peoples, many of whom were expelled, enslaved, or killed during the early centuries of European colonization.

=== Settlement and creation of the municipality ===
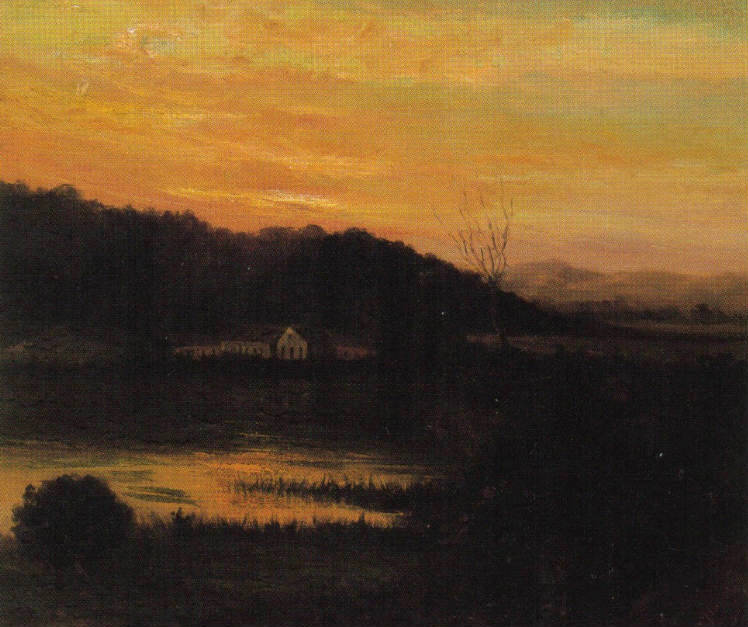
Landscape of the Piracicaba River by Almeida Júnior

The Piracicaba River Valley began to be settled by European descendants in the 17th century, as colonists ventured into the forest and occupied lands around the river, engaging in subsistence agriculture and timber extraction. The first confirmed record of a sesmaria (land grant) in the Piracicaba region dates to 1726, though there is evidence of a sesmaria granted as early as 1693 to Pedro de Morais Cavalcanti. Granted to Felipe Cardoso from Itu, the 1726 sesmaria was located about one kilometer from the Piracicaba River rapids, attracting various settlers and landholders to the area, which was partly traversed by roads leading to the village of Itu and the Cuiabá mines. This small rural community is depicted in the "Map of the Captaincy of São Paulo," produced by Genoese cartographer Francesco Tosi Colombina in the 1750s, which shows a locality called the "new settlement of Piracicaba" on the right bank of the river.

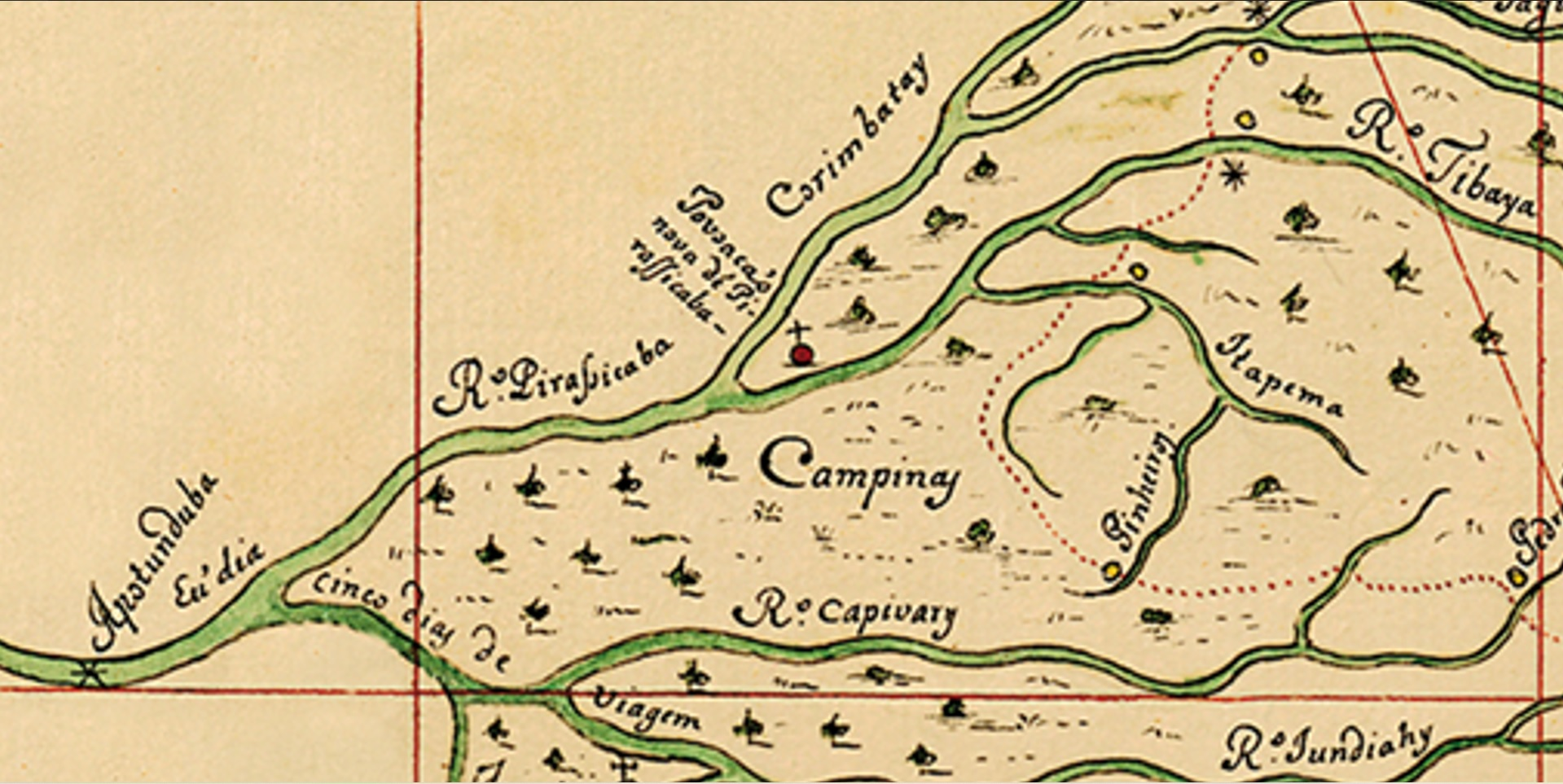
Excerpt from the Map of the Captaincy of São Paulo, produced in the 1750s by Francesco Tosi Colombina, showing the "New Settlement of Piracicaba."

In 1766, the governor of the Captaincy of São Paulo, Dom Luís António de Sousa Botelho Mourão, decided to establish a settlement to support navigation along the Tietê River toward the Paraná River and to provide logistical support for the Fort of Iguatemi, located near the future border with Paraguay. The settlement was intended for the confluence of the Piracicaba and Tietê rivers, near present-day Santa Maria da Serra, but Captain Antônio Correa Barbosa, tasked with the mission, chose a site between seventy and ninety kilometers from the confluence, already occupied by settlers and offering better access to other regional villages, particularly Itu. The settlement of Piracicaba was founded on August 1, 1767, on the right bank of the river, near the future location of the Central Mill and parts of Vila Rezende. As was customary in colonial times, settlements authorized to build a chapel were dedicated to a Christian saint, with Our Lady of Pleasures initially chosen, later changed to Saint Anthony. Politically, the settlement was linked to Itu, the nearest village. In 1774, it was elevated to freguesia status, with about 230 inhabitants and 45 houses, according to a 1775 census.

In 1777, the Fort of Iguatemi was captured by the Spanish, part of a broader military campaign that included the conquest of the Colony of Sacramento in present-day Uruguay and the surrender of Portuguese fortresses on Santa Catarina Island. Consequently, the freguesia of Piracicaba likely experienced indirect impacts, as supporting the fort was a key local economic activity. Additionally, conflicts between Antonio Correa Barbosa and the first parish priest, Father João Manuel da Silva, led to the latter's transfer request in 1776, leaving Piracicaba without religious services for the next eight years. Tensions between the local population and Correa Barbosa were reportedly frequent, culminating in a collective petition against the so-called Founder of Piracicaba to the captain-general of the Captaincy of São Paulo in 1786.

The uneven and infertile terrain on the left bank of the river prompted the relocation of the freguesia seat to the right bank in 1784. Historian Joaquim Silveira Melo notes, “With the abandonment of the Iguatemi colony, the reasons for the settlement’s existence on the right bank of the Piracicaba diminished; there was no longer a need for a shipyard to build canoes or for the river to serve as a barrier preventing soldiers and exiles from taking the road to Itu at night. Thus, Captain Director António Corrêa Barbosa and Vicar Friar Tomé de Jesus sent a petition to Captain-General Francisco da Cunha Menezes on June 6, 1784, requesting the settlement’s relocation to the opposite side, on the left bank.” In the following years, a new church and residences were built in the chosen area, part of Felipe Cardoso’s former sesmaria, with agriculture expanding due to the fertile red soils on the left bank. Records show multiple sesmarias granted in Piracicaba in 1795, indicating the expansion of cultivated areas around the freguesia.

In the early 19th century, the region developed through river navigation and sugarcane cultivation, heavily reliant on enslaved African labor. In 1808, the freguesia’s layout was planned under the orders of Captain-General Franca e Horta, with uniformly wide streets forming right angles and regular blocks to facilitate the demarcation of public and private lands. In 1821, the freguesia was elevated to town status, named Vila Nova da Constituição in honor of the Portuguese Constitution of 1822, then under approval. The new town was formed from territories previously belonging to the towns of Itu and Porto Feliz. With its new status and the growth of sugarcane cultivation, Vila Nova da Constituição experienced a significant economic boom. On August 11, 1822, the first meeting of the city council was held.

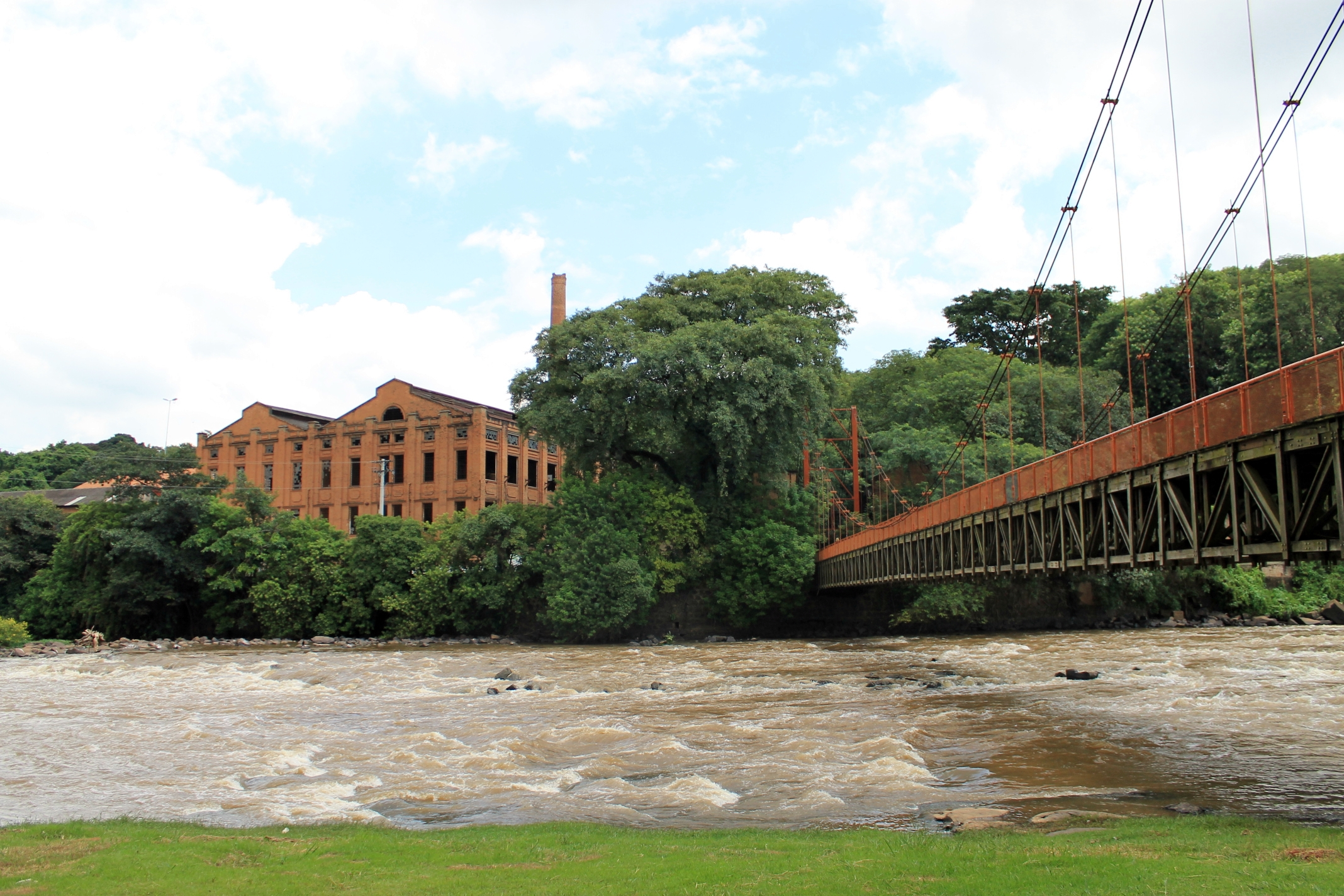
Central Mill of Piracicaba, founded in 1881.

Piracicaba grew rapidly, becoming the main city in the region and influencing other towns that later became the cities of São Pedro, Limeira, Capivari, Rio Claro, and Santa Bárbara d'Oeste. The city remained focused on sugarcane cultivation, overlooking the rise of coffee in Western São Paulo, which became the driving force of the São Paulo economy by the late 19th century. Due to sugarcane, the region became a major slaveholding hub in Western São Paulo, with a significant presence of enslaved and freed Black individuals. According to 1817 records, when Piracicaba was still a freguesia, local farms and sugarcane mills held about 890 enslaved Black individuals. By 1887, on the eve of the Lei Áurea, approximately 5,663 Africans and Afro-Brazilians were enslaved in Piracicaba, making it the third city—then with about 22,000 free inhabitants—with the most slaves in the Province of São Paulo. However, in 1847, Senator Nicolau Pereira de Campos Vergueiro (known as Senator Vergueiro), owner of the Ibicaba Farm (then part of Piracicaba’s territory), pioneered the use of waged immigrant labor to replace enslaved Africans, hiring Swiss and German families.

In 1877, Piracicaba received a railroad connection through the Companhia Ytuana de Estradas de Ferro to Itu and Jundiaí, via Capivari and Indaiatuba. That same year, through the efforts of its then-councilor and future President of Brazil, Prudente de Morais, the city adopted the name "Piracicaba," abandoning the Portuguese designation Vila Nova da Constituição. In 1881, the Central Mill of Piracicaba, founded on the banks of the Piracicaba River, became one of Brazil’s largest sugarcane mills in the following years.

=== 20th and 21st centuries ===
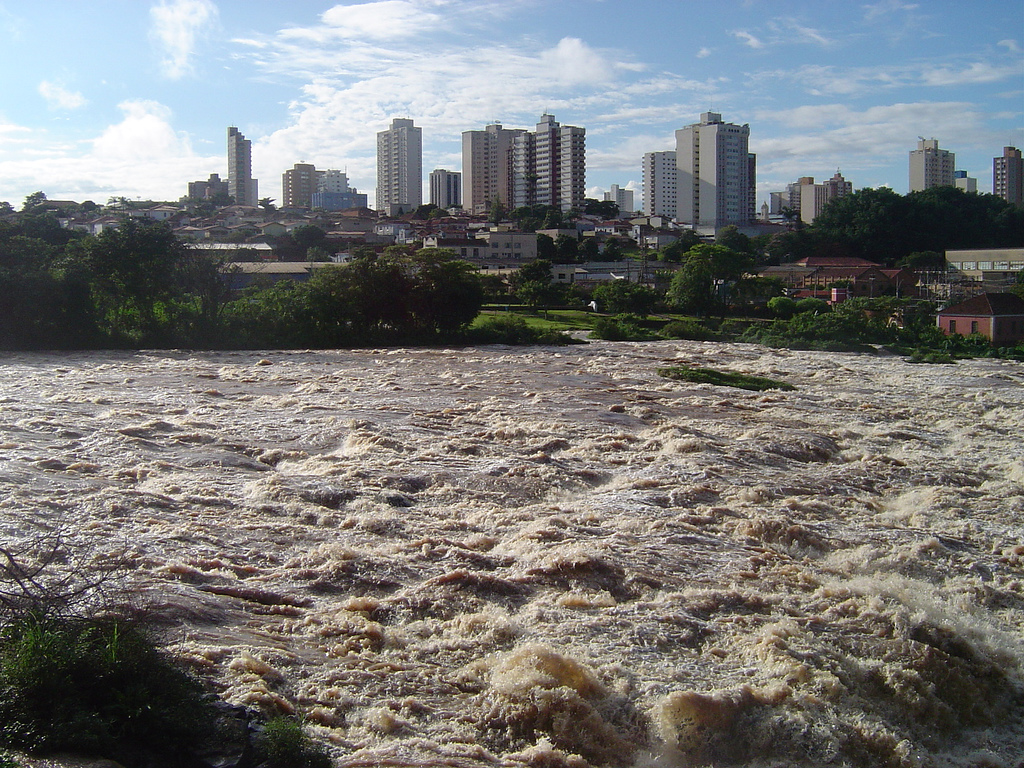
The city today, with the Piracicaba River in the foreground, along whose banks it developed.

By 1900, Piracicaba had established itself as one of the largest hubs in São Paulo state: it was the fourth largest city in the state, had electric lighting, telephone services, and, on land donated by Luiz Vicente de Sousa Queiroz, the foundation of the future Luiz de Queiroz College of Agriculture was begun. In 1922, 45 years after the arrival of the Companhia Ytuana railway, Piracicaba received a Companhia Paulista railway branch.

However, Piracicaba entered a prolonged period of stagnation and slight decline that affected the city for much of the 20th century. The end of the coffee cycle and the persistent drop in sugar prices caused the local economy to stagnate. In an attempt to reverse this, Piracicaba was among the first Brazilian cities to industrialize, with the opening of factories in the metalworking and sugar production equipment sectors. Industrialization, still heavily tied to the sugarcane cycle, prevented a steeper decline but did not halt stagnation. From the second half of the 20th century, the city faced another challenge: the growth of Campinas and its surrounding area (now the Campinas Metropolitan Region).

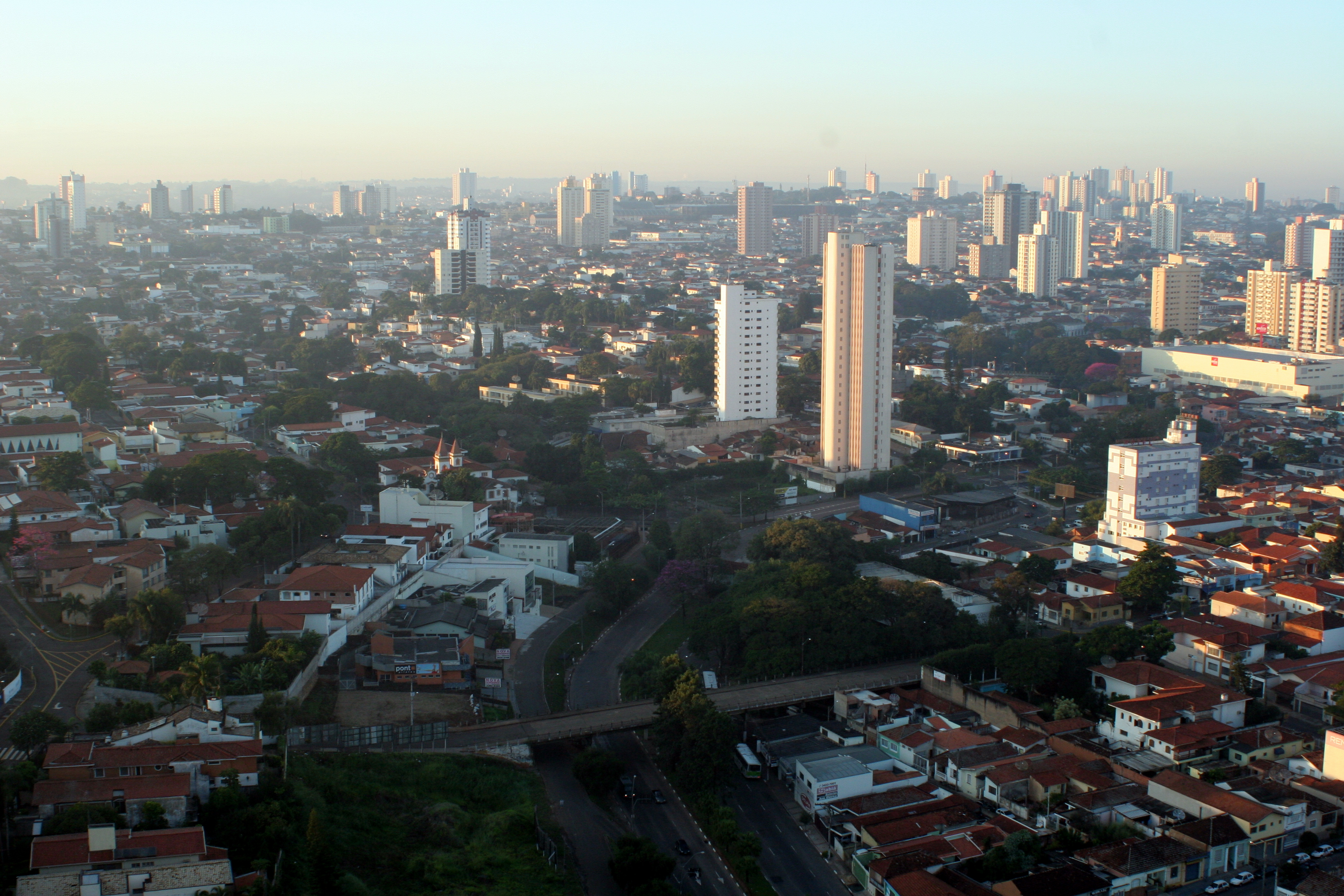
Aerial view of the municipality’s central region

From the 1970s, initiatives were launched to revitalize Piracicaba’s economy. The Sugar Highway was built, connecting the city to the Castelo Branco Highway, providing a new route for product transport and maintaining Piracicaba’s influence in the Capivari region. The Luiz de Queiroz Highway was widened to the Anhanguera Highway, improving access and linking Piracicaba to São Paulo’s main interior highway. Industrial districts were established, and new companies arrived. Concurrently, the federal Pró-Álcool program, promoting automotive ethanol from sugarcane, modernized cultivation and revitalized the sugarcane industry. Other projects, such as the Santa Maria da Serra Dam (intended to resume river navigation and connect to the Paraná-Tietê Waterway), an ethanol pipeline, and a closer alignment with the Anhanguera Highway, were not realized. Instead, the Bandeirantes Highway was extended, passing through Santa Bárbara d'Oeste. Despite these setbacks, Piracicaba diversified its economy, overcoming stagnation and attracting significant investments over the last two decades.

On March 29, 2006, Piracicaba was struck by a historic supercell storm, accompanied by a tornado in the area of the Luiz de Queiroz College of Agriculture (Esalq) campus. Numerous trees were felled, with the Municipal Government reporting about 2,700 trees (3% of the city’s total) damaged, including approximately 500 on the Esalq campus and 400 on the Taquaral campus of the Methodist University of Piracicaba (UNIMEP). A state of emergency was declared for 60 days, with urban damages estimated at over R$1.5 million. Sugarcane production was severely affected, with 350,000 tons lost. Data from the Esalq weather station recorded maximum winds of 158.4 km/h.

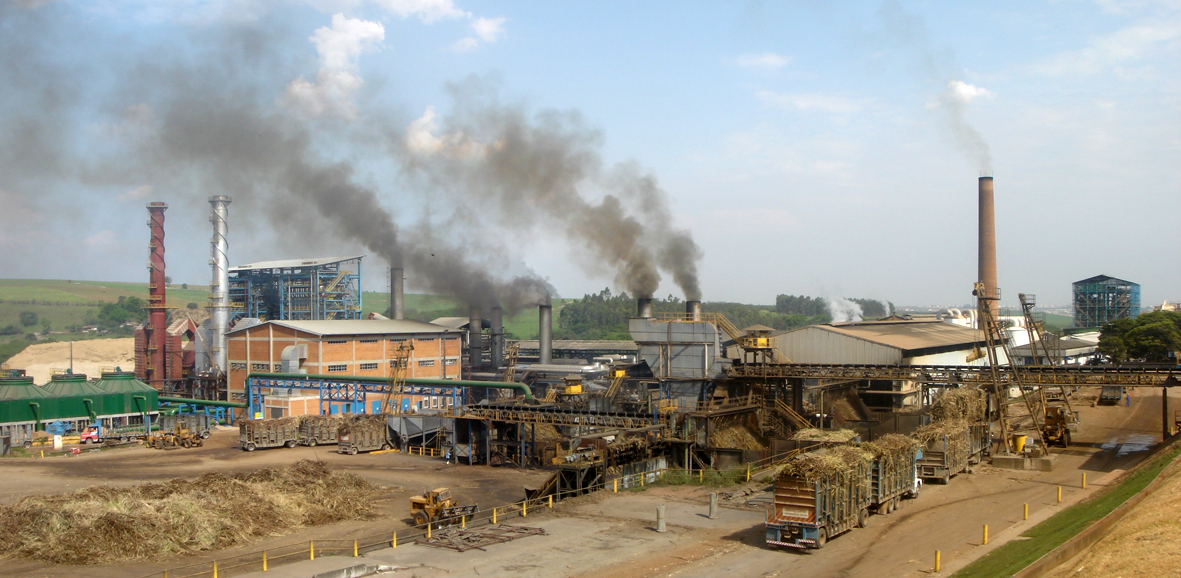
View of the Costa Pinto Mill in Piracicaba, a factory that produces sugar, ethanol, and alcohol.

The municipality has shown strong development indicators, reclaiming degraded areas and investing in biotechnology and export products for future growth. In 2012, Piracicaba had the second largest population and third largest economy in the Administrative Region of Campinas (surpassed only by Campinas and Jundiaí), ranking among the world’s top sugar and ethanol production hubs, with a significant industrial center and renowned universities.

In 2012, the city welcomed a Hyundai factory, generating thousands of jobs and transforming the region, significantly boosting its industrial sector and making it one of the most prominent in São Paulo’s interior. According to the IBGE, Piracicaba’s gross domestic product in 2012 was R$11.9 billion. Other microregion seats, Limeira and Rio Claro, had GDPs of R$7.7 billion and R$5.8 billion, respectively, in 2012. Neighboring mesoregion seats Campinas, Ribeirão Preto, and Araraquara had GDPs of R$42.8 billion, R$20.3 billion, and R$5.7 billion, respectively. In June 2012, the Piracicaba Urban Agglomeration was established, listed by the IBGE in 2014 among Brazil’s 25 largest administrative regions by population. By 2015, it ranked 20th, with 1.412 million inhabitants.

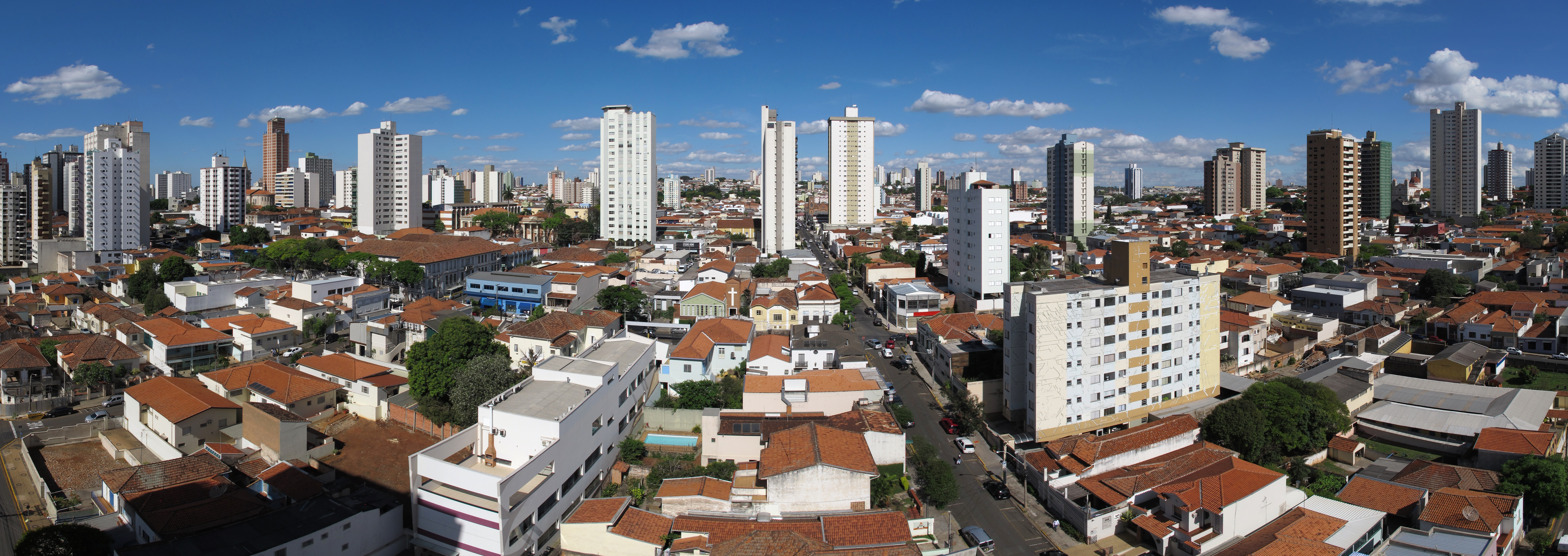
Panorama of the city in September 2013

== Geography ==
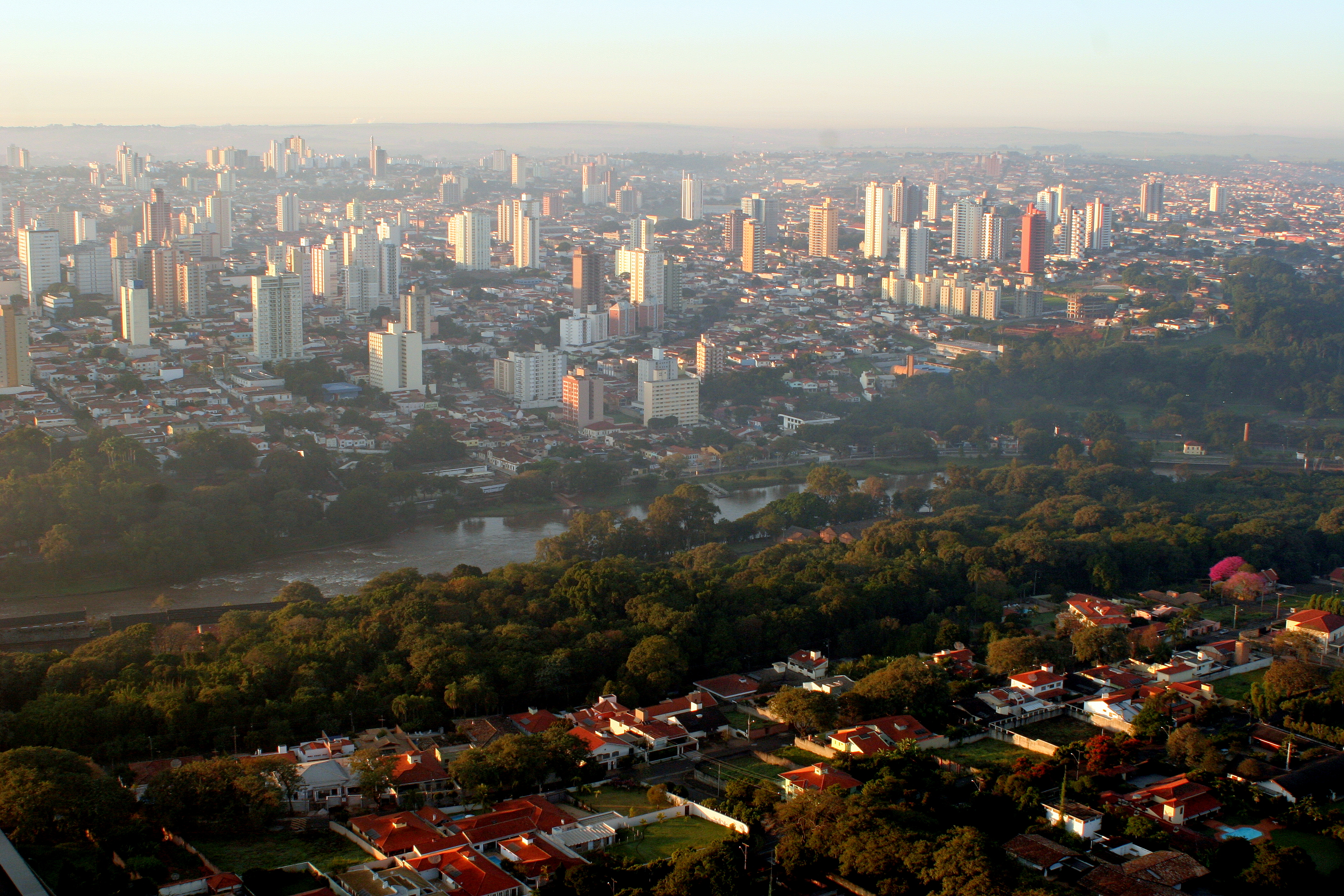
Partial view of the city with the Piracicaba River running through it. The urban area has a flatter and slightly undulating terrain.

The municipality of Piracicaba covers an area of 1,378.069 square kilometres (532.075 sq mi), of which 168.824 square kilometres (65.183 sq mi) is classified as urban. According to the regional division established by the Brazilian Institute of Geography and Statistics (IBGE) in 2017, Piracicaba belongs to the Intermediate Geographic Region of Campinas and the Immediate Geographic Region of Piracicaba.

Piracicaba is located at 22°43′30″ south latitude and 47°38′56″ west longitude, approximately 152 kilometers northwest of the state capital, São Paulo. It shares borders with the following municipalities: Saltinho, Laranjal Paulista, Rio das Pedras, and Tietê to the south; Santa Bárbara d'Oeste to the southeast; Limeira and Iracemápolis to the east; Rio Claro to the northeast; São Pedro, Charqueada, and Ipeúna to the north; Santa Maria da Serra to the northwest; Anhembi to the west; and Conchas to the southwest.

=== Geomorphology and hydrography ===
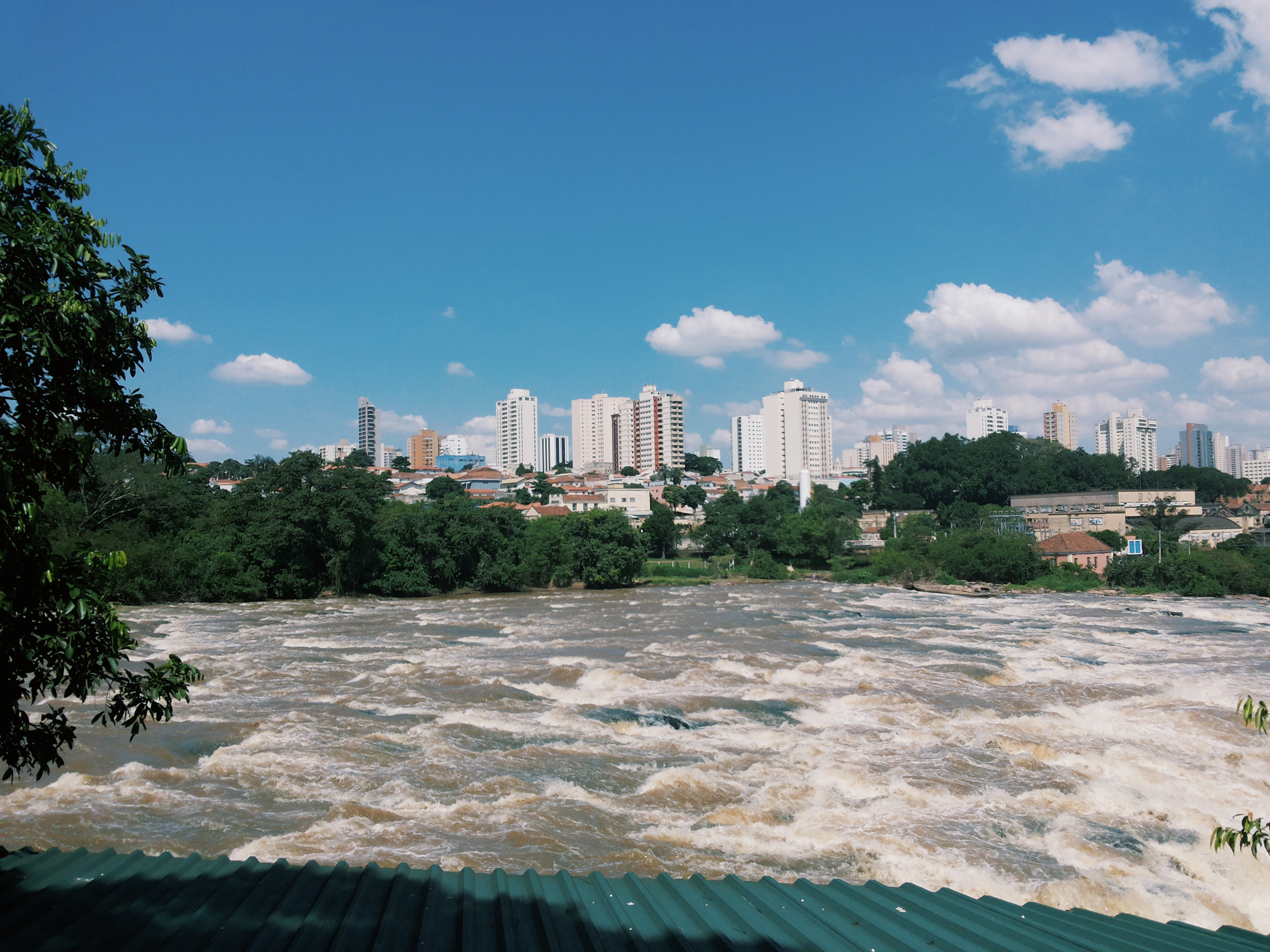
Piracicaba River

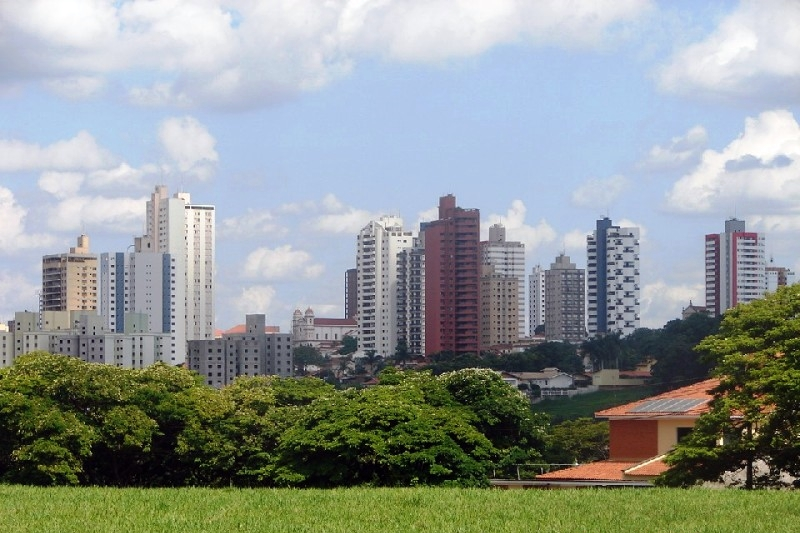
View of the city center from Presidente Kennedy Avenue.

The terrain of Piracicaba is predominantly rugged, with a notable depression in the central part of its territory. This depression extends along the east-west course of the Piracicaba River, becoming more pronounced within the urban area at the river's waterfall. This region separates the watersheds of the Piracicaba and Tietê rivers. Valleys converging toward the Tietê River in the southwest and the Piracicaba River in the central region trend north-northwest, creating more pronounced depressions in these areas. The lowest elevations are approximately 420 meters, while the highest average around 780 meters. The average altitude of Piracicaba is 528 meters, situated in a significantly sloped area with an average slope of 7.8%.

Piracicaba exhibits a wide variety of soils, some of which are highly fertile, supporting the municipality's agricultural activities. This diversity results from the combination of different geological materials and the rugged terrain. The predominant soil types are latosols, which have medium to clayey textures, are dense, and capable of retaining water. Their fertility varies but is generally low, requiring fertilization and soil management to achieve high productivity. In the northern, central, and southern regions, podzolic soils are prevalent, mixed with other types such as brunizems, leptosols, and cambisols, which are widely used in agriculture. In the western part of Piracicaba, soils are highly sandy, with low fertility, limited water retention capacity, and a propensity for erosion.

The terrain's ruggedness directly influences the drainage network, which, in turn, can alter the surface configuration. The hydrographic networks are more concentrated in the central and northern parts of Piracicaba, with a total drainage length of 2,139 kilometres (1,329 mi) across the municipality. The main rivers flowing through the territory are the Piracicaba, Tietê, and Corumbataí.

=== Climate ===
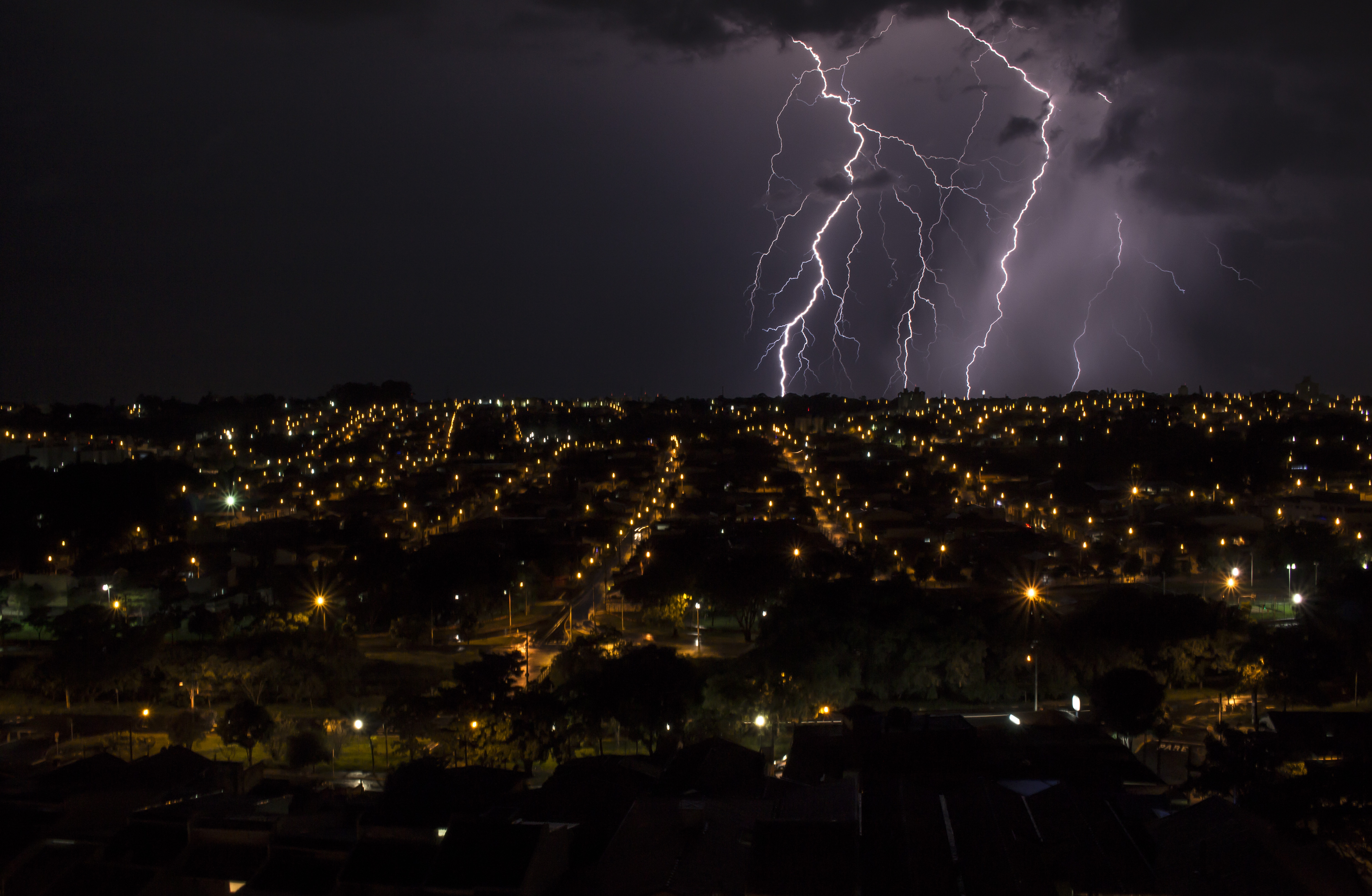
Storm approaching Piracicaba on a spring night

The predominant climate in Piracicaba is a tropical savanna climate with a dry winter (Aw according to the Köppen classification) since 1987, characterized by distinct wet and dry seasons and an average annual temperature of 23.9 °C (75.0 °F). Winters are mild with low precipitation, rarely excessively cold, while summers are rainy with high temperatures, often exceeding 32 °C (90 °F). However, it has become increasingly common for summer rainfall to be concentrated in a few days, often falling short of the monthly average. Conversely, October and November, during spring, have seen more regular and often above-average precipitation. The warmest month, February, has an average temperature of 24.7 °C (76.5 °F), with an average maximum of 30.5 °C (86.9 °F) and a minimum of 19.1 °C (66.4 °F). The coldest month, July, averages 17.7 °C (63.9 °F), with maximum and minimum averages of 25.3 °C (77.5 °F) and 9.6 °C (49.3 °F), respectively. Autumn and spring serve as transitional seasons. Although February is the warmest month on average, the highest absolute maximum temperatures, often exceeding 40 °C (104 °F), are typically recorded during the meteorological spring (September, October, and November).

The average annual precipitation is 1,273.3 millimetres (50.13 in), with July being the driest month, averaging 28.2 millimetres (1.11 in). January, the wettest month, averages 229.5 millimetres (9.04 in). In recent years, hot and dry days during winter have become more frequent, often surpassing 30 °C (86 °F), particularly between July and September. During dry seasons and prolonged dry spells within the rainy season, wildfires in rural areas, especially in sugarcane fields, are common, contributing to deforestation and air pollution, which affects air quality. These fires, often intentionally set to clear land, have been banned.

According to data collected by the Luiz de Queiroz College of Agriculture (ESALQ) from 1917 to 2009, the lowest recorded temperature in Piracicaba was −2.6 °C (27.3 °F) on 2 August 1955, and the highest was 40.2 °C (104.4 °F) on 18 November 1985. The highest 24-hour rainfall was 139.1 millimetres (5.48 in) on 25 May 2004, and the lowest recorded relative humidity was 23% on 29 August 1963. Temperatures above 40 °C (104 °F) have become more frequent. The first recorded instance was in November 1985, when ESALQ measured 40.2 °C (104.4 °F), setting a historical heat record. This record was surpassed three times in 2020, with temperatures of 40.4 °C (104.7 °F), 40.5 °C (104.9 °F), and 41.2 °C (106.2 °F), all recorded in October. On 21 September 2021, the Integrated Center for Agrometeorological Information (CIIAGRO) recorded 41.5 °C (106.7 °F), the highest temperature ever officially measured in Piracicaba’s history. This value was also reported by the Campinas Agronomic Institute (IAC).

Climate data for Piracicaba, elevation 544 m (1,785 ft), (1991–2020 normals, extremes 1955–2021)
Month	Jan	Feb	Mar	Apr	May	Jun	Jul	Aug	Sep	Oct	Nov	Dec	Year
Record high °C (°F)	37.5 (99.5)	38.5 (101.3)	37.1 (98.8)	35.9 (96.6)	35.3 (95.5)	32.8 (91.0)	33.1 (91.6)	36.3 (97.3)	41.5 (106.7)	41.2 (106.2)	40.5 (104.9)	38.7 (101.7)	41.5 (106.7)
Mean daily maximum °C (°F)	30.7 (87.3)	31.0 (87.8)	30.5 (86.9)	29.4 (84.9)	26.4 (79.5)	25.8 (78.4)	26.2 (79.2)	28.1 (82.6)	29.4 (84.9)	30.5 (86.9)	30.5 (86.9)	30.9 (87.6)	29.1 (84.4)
Daily mean °C (°F)	25.1 (77.2)	25.1 (77.2)	24.5 (76.1)	22.6 (72.7)	19.3 (66.7)	18.3 (64.9)	18.2 (64.8)	19.5 (67.1)	21.7 (71.1)	23.6 (74.5)	24.0 (75.2)	24.9 (76.8)	22.2 (72.0)
Mean daily minimum °C (°F)	19.4 (66.9)	19.2 (66.6)	18.5 (65.3)	15.9 (60.6)	12.2 (54.0)	10.8 (51.4)	10.1 (50.2)	10.9 (51.6)	13.9 (57.0)	16.6 (61.9)	17.5 (63.5)	19.0 (66.2)	15.3 (59.6)
Record low °C (°F)	10.2 (50.4)	11.4 (52.5)	8.8 (47.8)	0.8 (33.4)	−0.2 (31.6)	−1.8 (28.8)	−1.8 (28.8)	−2.6 (27.3)	0.7 (33.3)	3.0 (37.4)	8.6 (47.5)	10.7 (51.3)	−2.6 (27.3)
Average precipitation mm (inches)	252.7 (9.95)	175.1 (6.89)	161.5 (6.36)	71.9 (2.83)	62.3 (2.45)	45.3 (1.78)	30.4 (1.20)	28.5 (1.12)	66.3 (2.61)	113.3 (4.46)	159.1 (6.26)	184.3 (7.26)	1,350.7 (53.17)
Average precipitation days (≥ 1.0 mm)	17.3	14.1	12.5	6.3	6.2	5.6	4.3	3.7	6.7	10.4	11.6	15.1	113.8
Source: Centro Integrado de Informações Agrometeorológicas

=== Environment ===
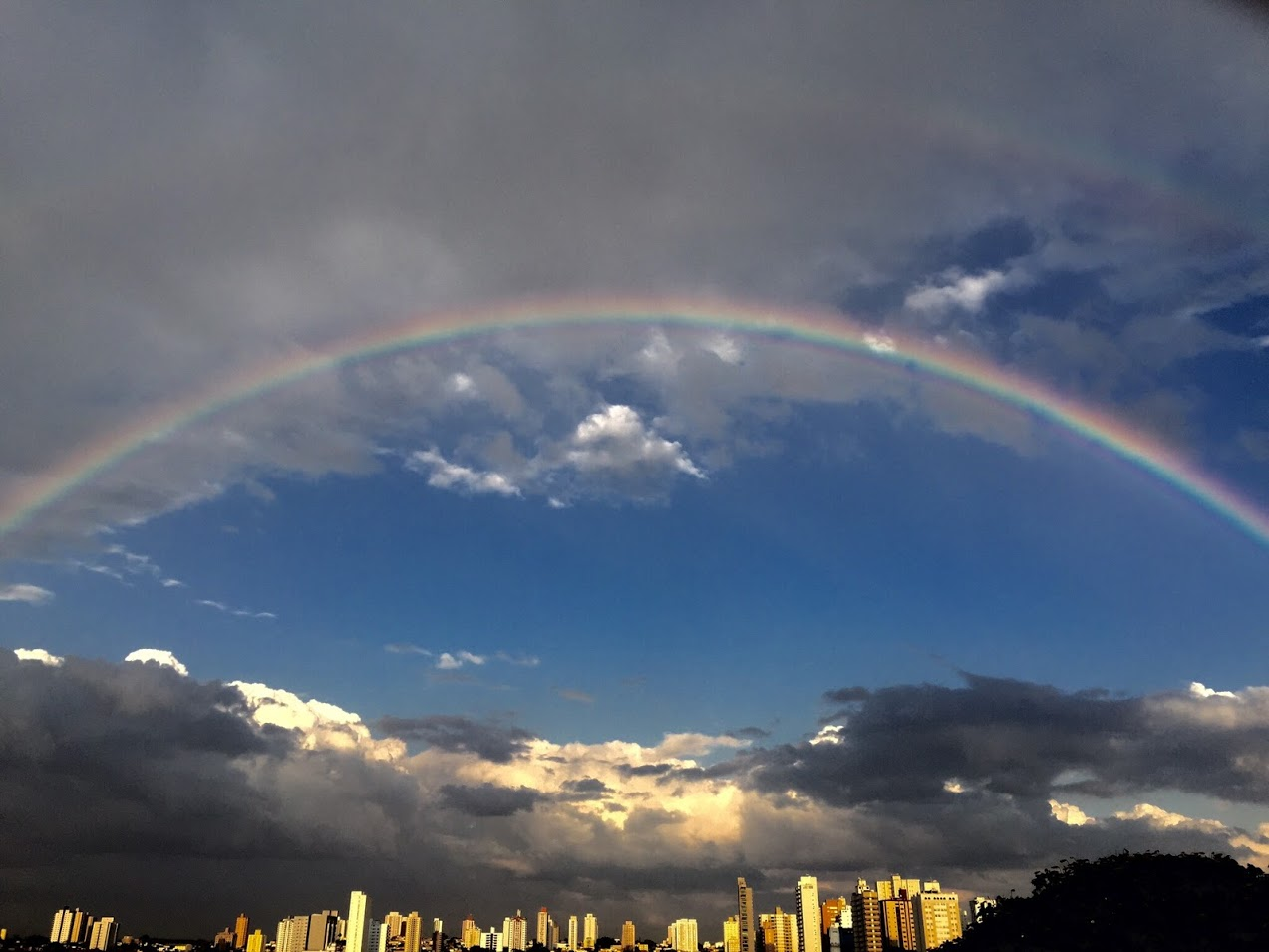
Rainbow in Piracicaba

The original and predominant vegetation in Piracicaba is the Atlantic Forest, with remaining fragments of various phytogeographic units, including seasonal semideciduous forest, swamp forest, and seasonal deciduous forest. Some areas, particularly those with sandy soils prone to erosion, exhibit characteristics of cerrado. The presence of these vegetation types is due to the edaphic characteristics, as well as the geological, geomorphological, and hydrological features of specific areas.

Areas dominated by seasonal semideciduous forest were once prevalent but have been largely destroyed due to agricultural expansion, with remaining fragments limited to environmental preservation areas or inaccessible locations. Timber extraction during the 20th century, used for construction or railway development, further reduced these forests. Riparian forests are primarily found along watercourses. Broadleaf hygrophilous forests occur in waterlogged soils with near-permanent flooding, restricted to areas with strong hydrological influence. Seasonal deciduous forests are found on litholic (typically shallow) and highly acidic soils with low water retention capacity during the dry season. Cerrado areas, located away from watercourses, particularly in elevated parts of the peripheral depression and the western plateau, are often mistaken for pastures or eroded areas.

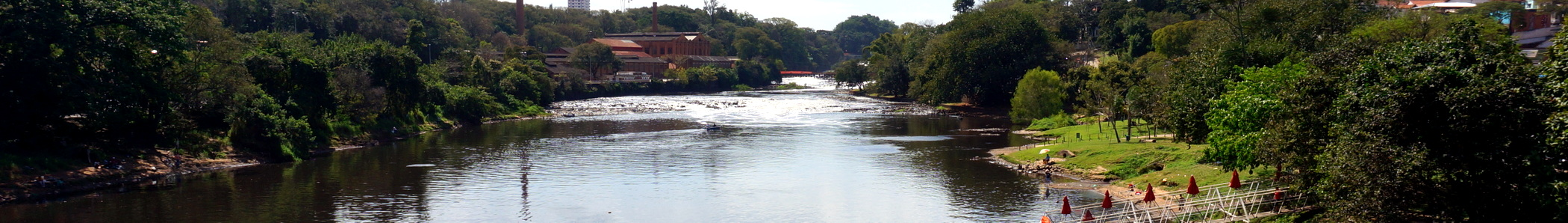
Panorama of the Piracicaba River as it passes through the city

== Demography ==
Historical population
Year	Pop.	±%
1872	15,753	—
1900	25,374	+61.1%
1920	67,732	+166.9%
1940	76,416	+12.8%
1950	87,835	+14.9%
1960	116,190	+32.3%
1970	152,505	+31.3%
1980	214,307	+40.5%
1991	283,833	+32.4%
2000	329,158	+16.0%
2010	364,571	+10.8%
2022	423,323	+16.1%
Sources: IBGE, CNM

According to the 2022 Brazilian census conducted by the Brazilian Institute of Geography and Statistics (IBGE), Piracicaba’s population was 423,323 inhabitants, with a population density of 307.19 inhabitants per square kilometre (795.6/sq mi).

The 2010 Brazilian census reported 178,538 male and 186,334 female inhabitants. Of the total population, 355,136 lived in the urban area, and 9,736 resided in the rural area. According to IBGE’s 2020 estimate, the municipal population was 407,252 inhabitants.

Piracicaba’s Municipal Human Development Index (HDI-M) is considered high by the United Nations Development Programme (UNDP). In 2010, the HDI-M was 0.785, ranking it as the 50th highest in São Paulo state (out of 645 municipalities) and the 92nd highest in Brazil (out of 5,565 municipalities). Most of Piracicaba’s indicators are classified as high and above the national average, according to UNDP.

=== Poverty and inequality ===
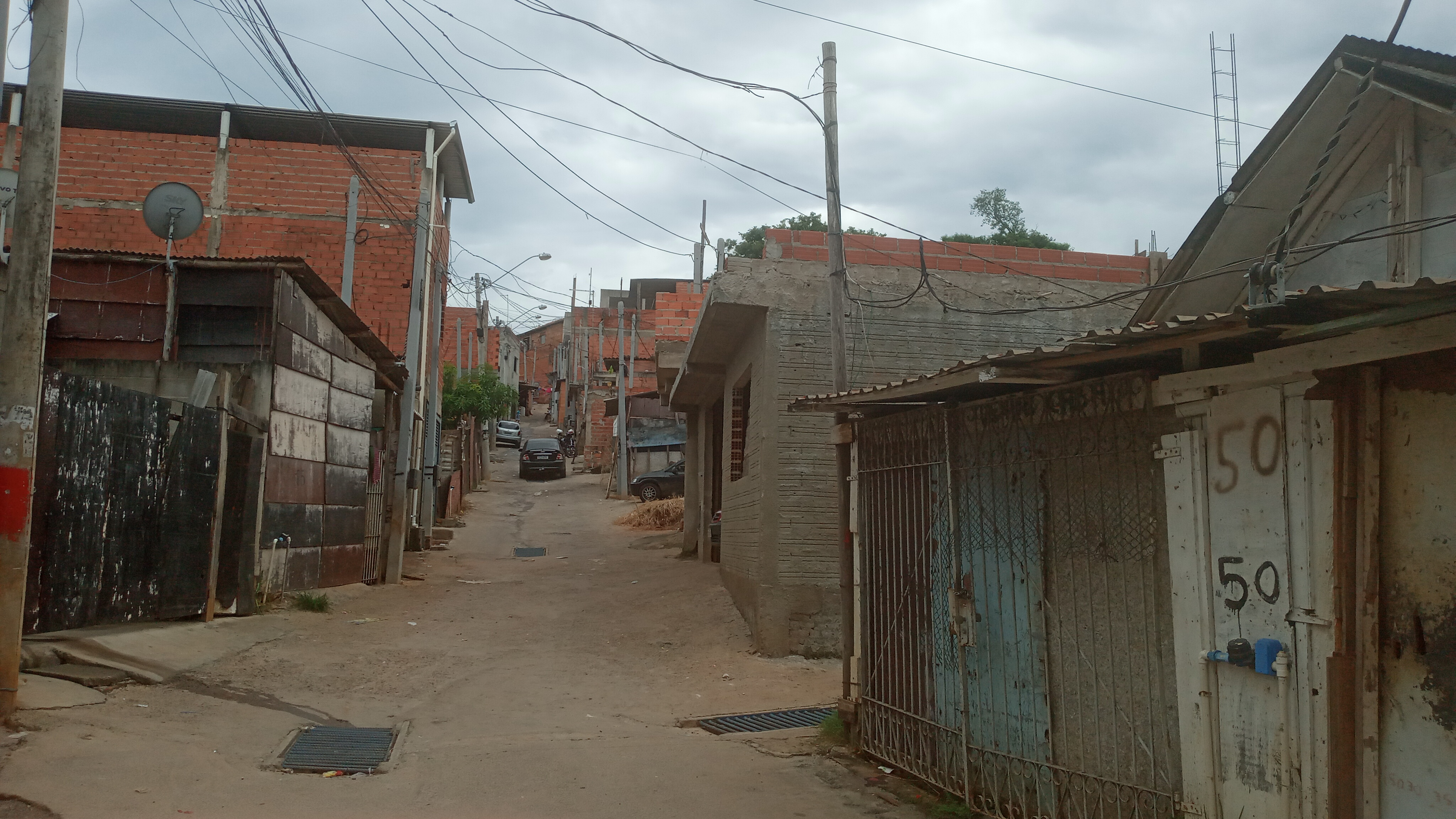
The Pantanal Community, located in the Jardim Itapuã neighborhood, is one of Piracicaba’s slums.

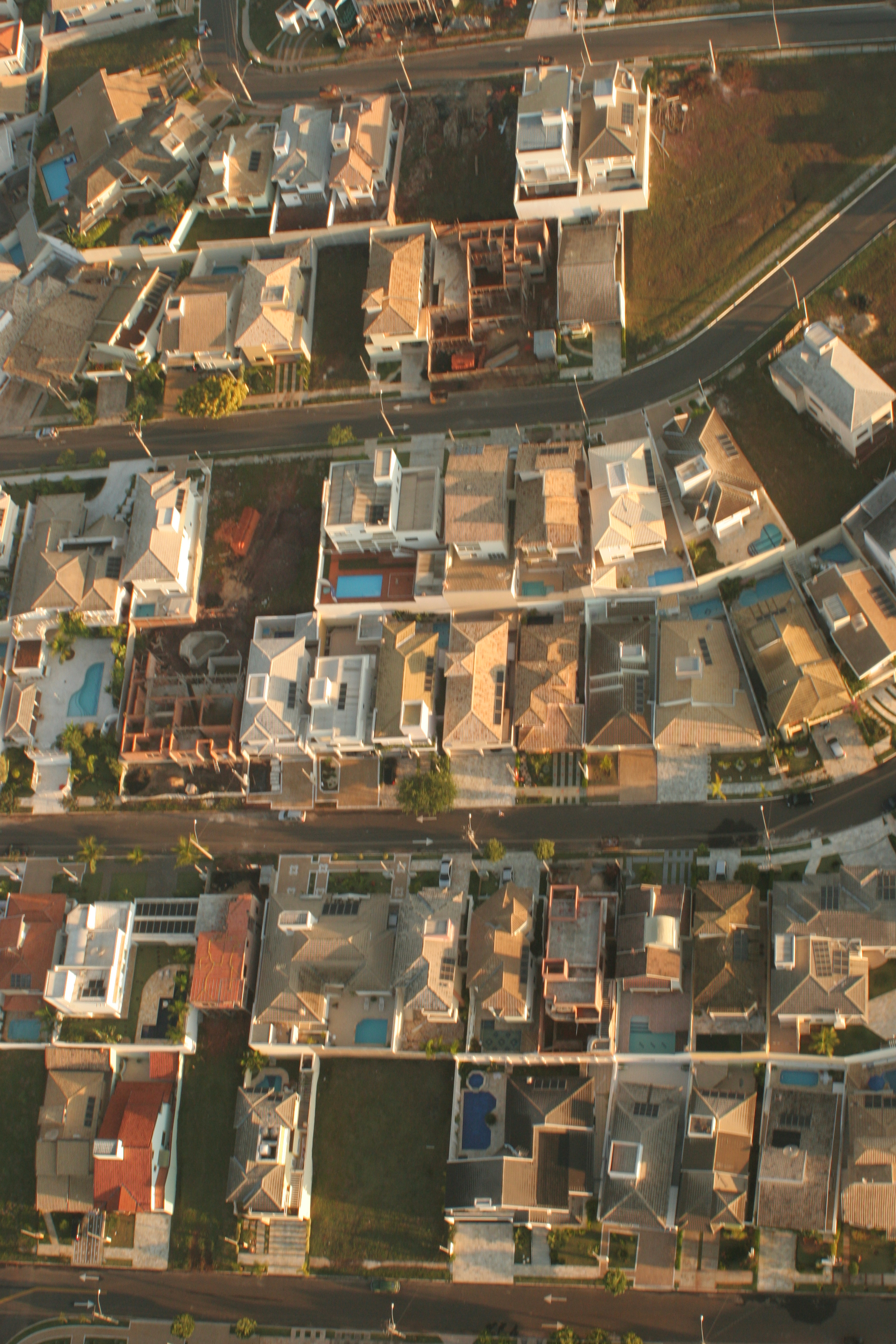
Residential upper-middle class neighborhood in the city

According to IBGE data from 2003, Piracicaba’s Gini coefficient, which measures social inequality, was 0.40, where 1.00 represents the highest inequality and 0.00 the lowest. In that year, the poverty incidence, as measured by IBGE, was 15.24%, with a lower limit of 11.43%, an upper limit of 19.05%, and a subjective poverty incidence of 11.81%. From 1991 to 2010, the proportion of people with a per capita household income of up to half the minimum wage decreased by 7.0%. In 2010, 86.4% of the population lived above the poverty line, 8.4% were at the poverty line, and 5.1% were below it. In 2000, the top 20% of the city’s wealthiest population accounted for 58.8% of the total municipal income, 19 times higher than the 3.1% share of the bottom 20%. In 1991, the bottom 20% had a 4.4% share, indicating an increase in social inequality from the early 1990s to 2000.

In 2008, according to the municipal government, there were records of slums, stilt houses, and irregular settlements. In 2000, 14,816 inhabitants lived in substandard housing clusters. The emergence of these clusters in Piracicaba was driven by the economic conditions of the 1970s, coupled with the establishment of the Industrial District and the rural exodus, which led to significant migration to the city. This caused rapid urban growth but was accompanied by negative impacts on the population’s quality of life. Low wages and a lack of public housing policies exacerbated the situation in the 1980s and 1990s.

Efforts to address this situation included attempts to relocate slum residents, but community resistance led to the urbanization of some substandard clusters in certain cases. In 1990, the Piracicaba Municipal Housing Development Company (EMDHAP) was established to lead the municipality’s housing policy and slum eradication efforts. During the 1990s, approximately 1,500 families were relocated to planned subdivisions or housing complexes. In 1997, a land regularization process began in some slums not located in high-risk areas, and urban development projects were initiated in certain clusters. However, a significant portion of the population still lacks adequate infrastructure. In 2021, Piracicaba had 76 recorded slums.

=== Religion ===
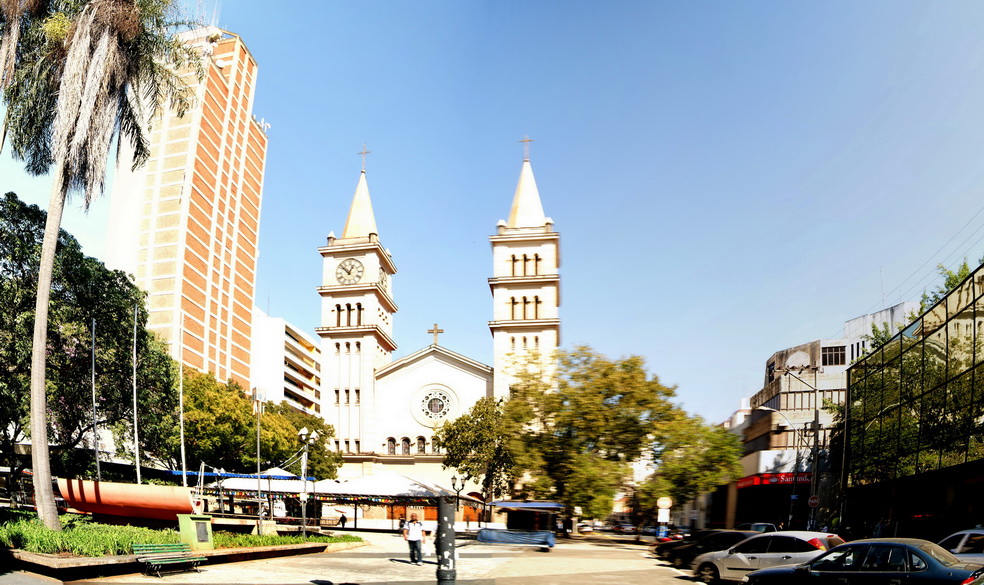
Santo Antônio Cathedral

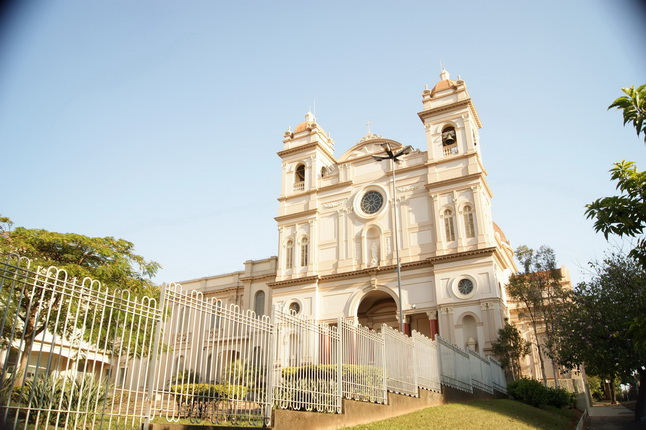
Dom Bosco Chapel

Piracicaba exhibits a rich diversity of religious practices, reflecting its cultural variety. While the city developed on a predominantly Catholic social foundation, influenced by both colonization and immigration—and with the majority of its residents still identifying as Catholic—numerous other religious denominations are present. These include dozens of Protestant denominations, as well as practices such as Buddhism, Islam, Spiritism, and others. In recent decades, Buddhism and Eastern religions have seen significant growth in the city. The Jewish, Mormon, and Afro-Brazilian religious communities are also notable. According to data from the 2010 Brazilian census conducted by IBGE, Piracicaba’s population in that year consisted of: Catholics (59.78%), Evangelicals (27.42%), no religion (7.47%), Spiritists (2.29%), and Jehovah’s Witnesses (0.95%). The remaining 2.09% of the resident population identified themselves with other religious denominations or had an undetermined religious affiliation.

==== Roman Catholic Church ====
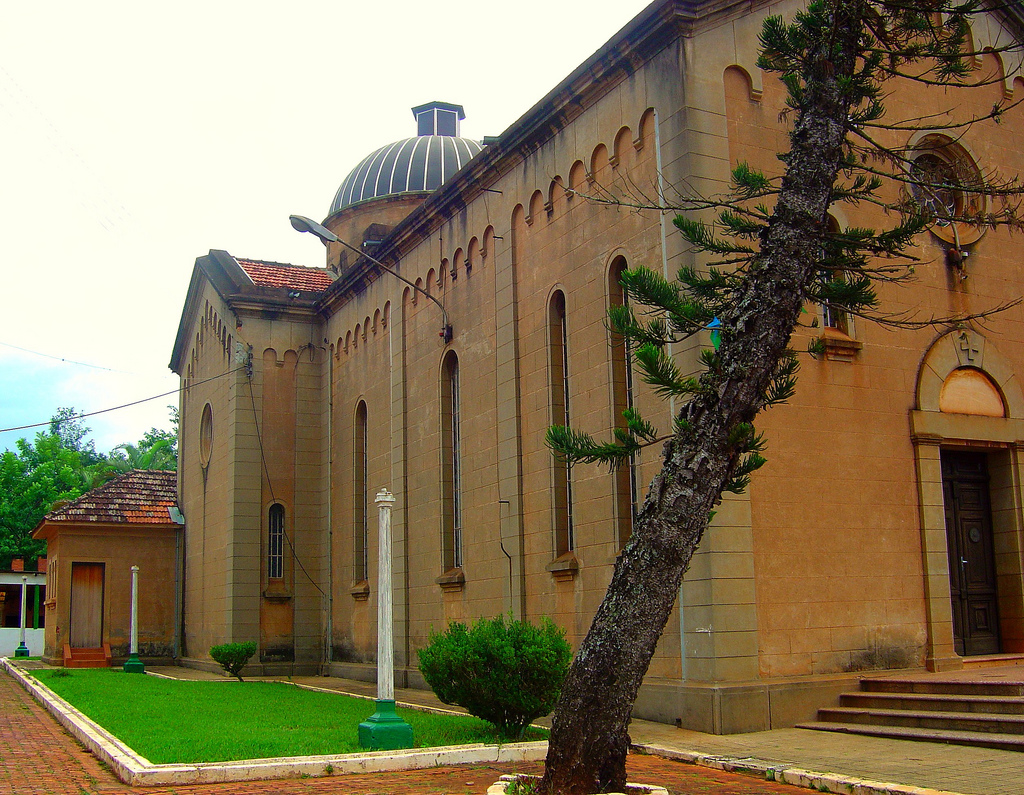
Monte Alegre Church, inaugurated in 1937 and designed by Alfredo Volpi.

According to the Catholic Church’s organizational structure, Piracicaba is part of the Archdiocese of Campinas, established on 19 April 1958, and serves as the seat of the Diocese of Piracicaba. The diocese, created as a parish on 21 June 1774 and officially established as a diocese on 26 February 1944, encompasses Piracicaba and 15 other municipalities. For pastoral purposes, it is divided into six pastoral regions, with 57 parishes and 4 quasi-parishes. The diocese’s establishment was driven by rapid population growth in the region during the early 20th century, which facilitated the development of Catholicism in the area.

The Santo Antônio Cathedral, Piracicaba’s cathedral, serves as the seat of the Diocese of Piracicaba. Originally built as a neoclassical parish church, it deteriorated over time. Between 1946 and 1948, it underwent renovations and was officially reopened on 27 December 1950.

==== Protestant churches ====
Piracicaba is home to a wide range of Protestant or Reformed denominations, including the Sara Nossa Terra Evangelical Community, Maranata Christian Church, Lutheran Church, Presbyterian Church, Methodist Church, (Note: The Methodist Church of Piracicaba was founded on 22 September 1881, making it the third Methodist church established in Brazil. Igreja Metodista de Piracicaba, 1881 - "A Província - Paixão por Piracicaba" (1 June 2013)) Anglican Episcopal Church, Baptist churches, Assemblies of God, Seventh-day Adventist Church, World Church of God’s Power, Universal Church of the Kingdom of God, Christian Congregation in Brazil, and others. According to the 2010 Census, of Piracicaba’s Protestant population, 18% belonged to Pentecostal evangelical churches, 1.95% to mission-based evangelical churches, and 7.47% to other evangelical denominations. Other Christian groups included Jehovah’s Witnesses, representing 0.95% of the resident population, and members of The Church of Jesus Christ of Latter-day Saints (Mormons), accounting for 0.28%.

=== Ethnic composition ===
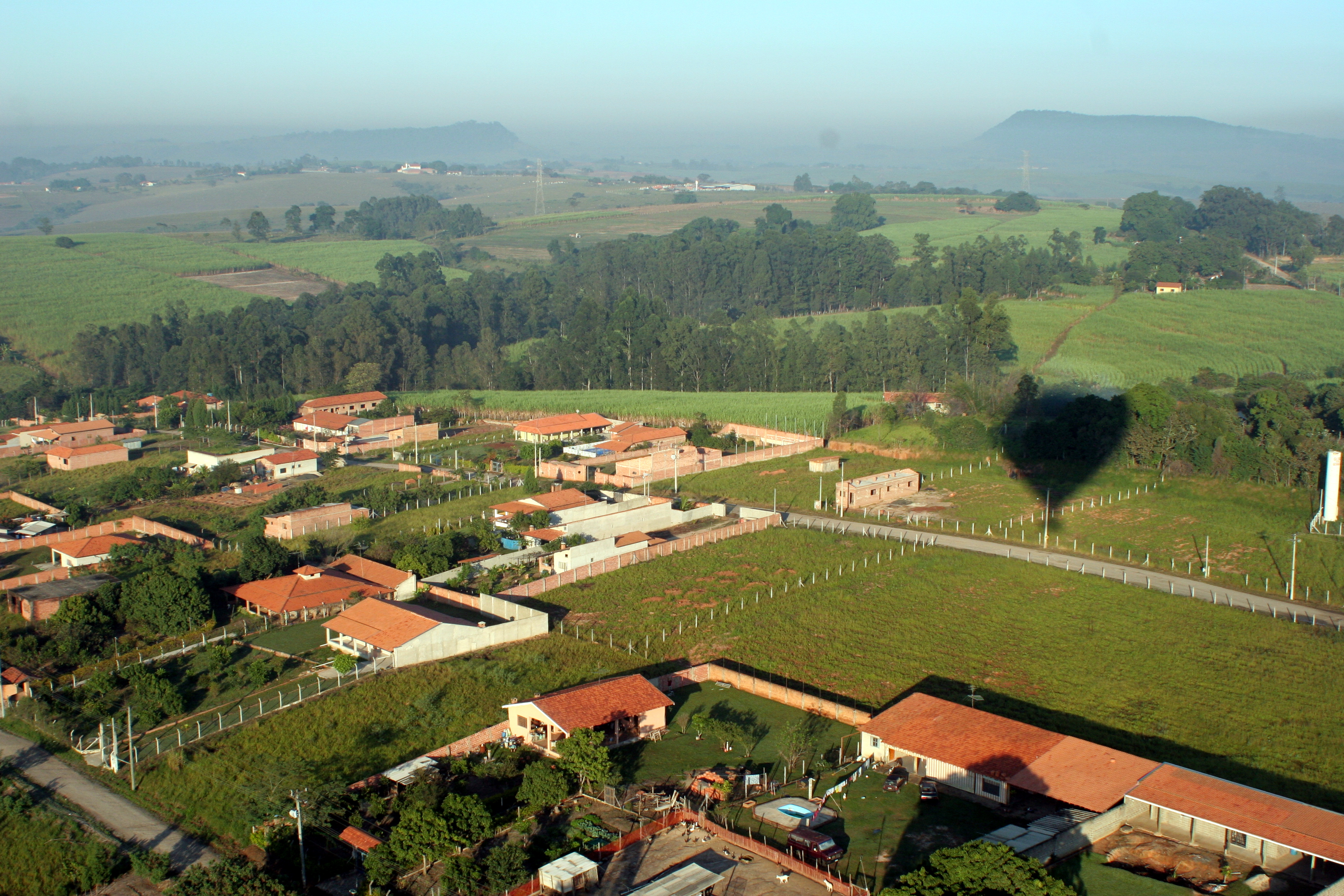
Farms in the rural area of Piracicaba. The immigrants brought with them many advances in agriculture.

According to the 2022 IBGE Census, Piracicaba’s population was composed of 272,080 Whites (64.27%), 33,333 Blacks (7.87%), 115,484 Pardos (27.28%), 2,095 Asians (0.49%), and 320 Indigenous people (0.08%).

In 2010, according to IBGE, there were 892 emigrants from other parts of São Paulo state and Brazil.

Immigration was more common in the early 20th century and significantly contributed to agriculture, particularly by improving rural labor. According to São Paulo’s Secretariat of Internal Affairs at the time, in 1895, there were 1,200 immigrants in the city. Of the 744 births that year, 237 had Italian fathers, 23 had Spanish fathers, 10 had Portuguese fathers, and 7 had German fathers.

Italian immigration was the most significant in Piracicaba, though there were also notable communities of Germans, Swiss, Arabs, Spaniards, Portuguese, Japanese, and Blacks who initially worked as slaves on plantations. After the abolition of slavery, many remained in the city.

== Politics and administration ==
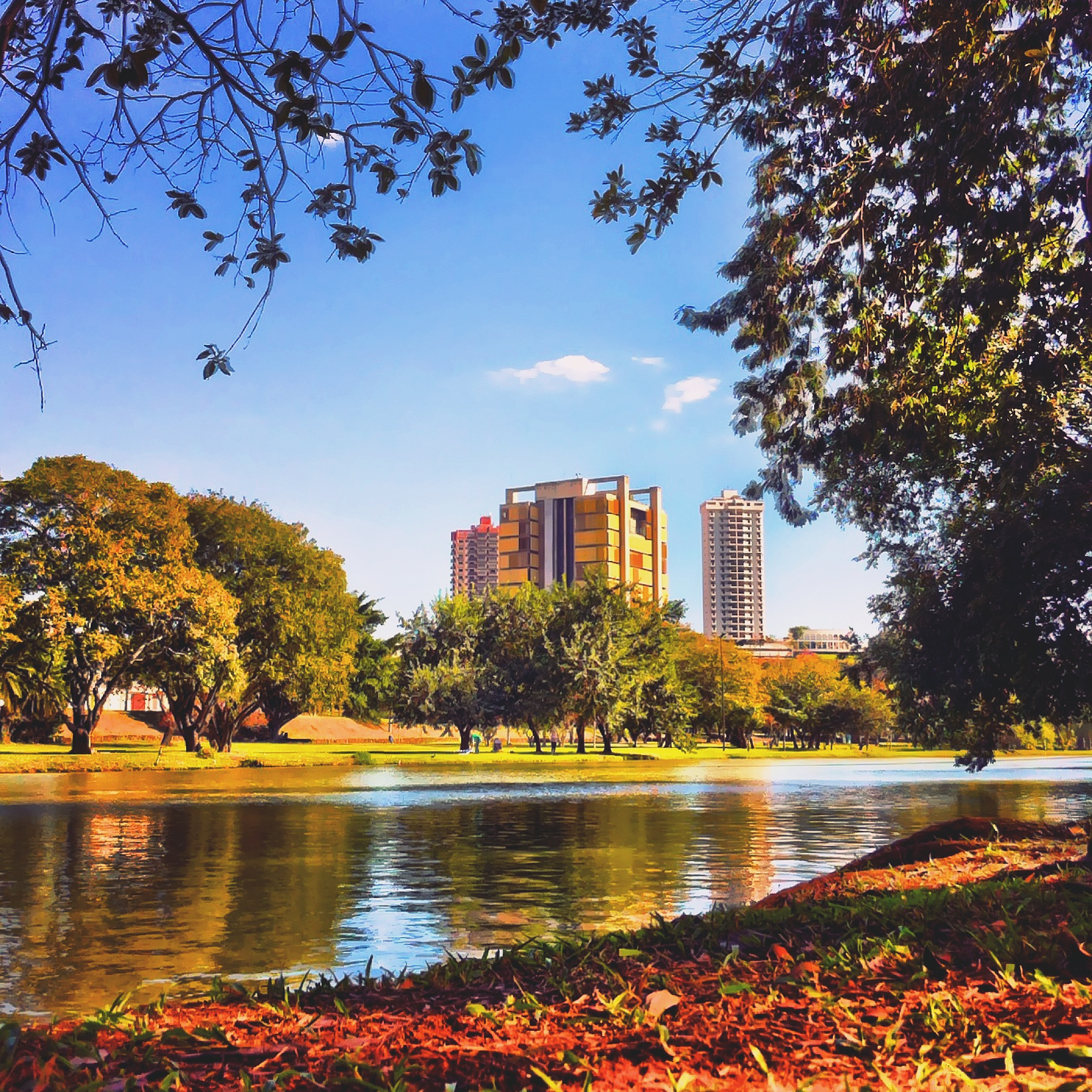
Piracicaba City Hall, located at Parque da Rua do Porto

Municipal administration is carried out by the executive branch and the legislative branch. The first person to govern the municipality was Paulo Pinto de Almeida, who served as intendant from 9 May to 18 July 1894. The current mayor is Helinho Zanatta of the Social Democratic Party (PSD), who won the 2024 election with 106,399 votes (53.61% of voters). He succeeded Luciano Almeida of the Progressive Party (PP), who was elected in the elections of 2020.

The legislative branch is represented by the municipal chamber, consisting of 23 councilors elected for four-year terms, in accordance with Article 29 of the Constitution. The chamber’s composition is as follows: 3 seats for the PL, 3 seats for the PSDB, 3 seats for the Cidadania, 2 seats for the SD, 2 seats for the Republicans, 2 seats for the Patriota, 1 seat for the Podemos, 1 seat for the PP, 1 seat for the PDT, 1 seat for the PSC, 1 seat for the DEM, 1 seat for the Avante, 1 seat for the PT, and 1 seat for the PV.

The municipality operates under an organic law, promulgated on 1 August 1996 and effective from the same date. It is also the seat of the Comarca of Piracicaba. As of April 2012, Piracicaba had 268,537 voters, representing 0.896% of São Paulo state’s total. The city has a sister city relationship with Seongnam, South Korea.

=== Subdivisions ===
The city is divided into five districts in addition to the Seat District: Ártemis, Guamium, Ibitiruna, Santa Teresinha de Piracicaba, and Tupi. It is also organized into five regions (North, South, East, West, and Central), and includes nearly 70 official and unofficial neighborhoods, villages, and subdivisions. The North Region, encompassing the Santa Teresinha de Piracicaba district and neighborhoods such as Algodoal, Areião, Parque Piracicaba, Mário Dedini, Guamium, Jardim Primavera, Santa Rosa, Vale do Sol, Vila Fátima, Vila Industrial, and Vila Sônia, is the most populous, with 69,276 inhabitants according to the 2000 IBGE census. The South Region, comprising neighborhoods such as Verde, Paulista, Água Branca, Campestre, Higienópolis, Jardim Califórnia, Jardim Caxambu, Jardim Elite, Monte Líbano, Nova América, and Pauliceia, is the second most populous, with 66,486 inhabitants.

== Economy ==
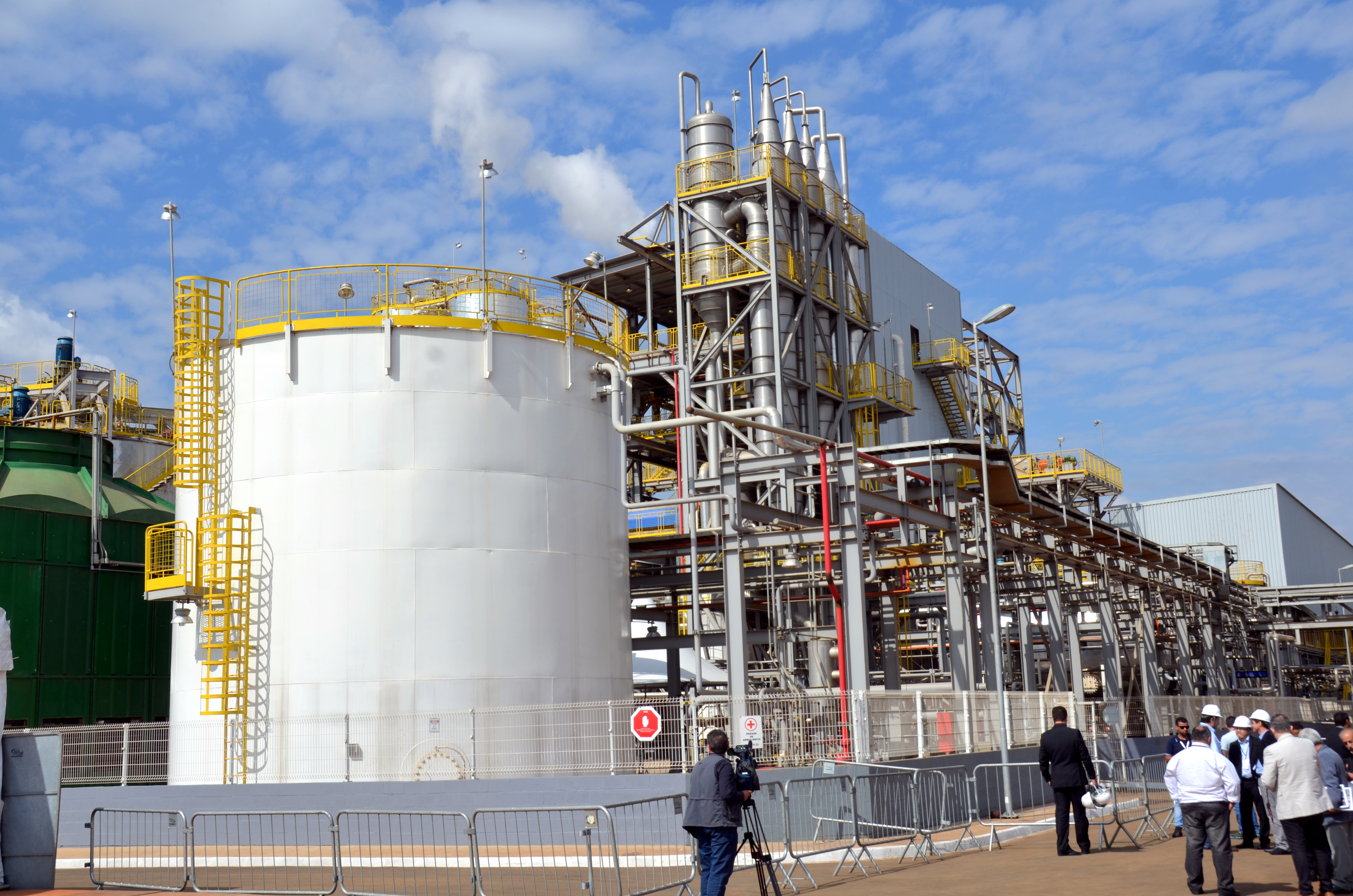
Second-generation ethanol plant by Raízen

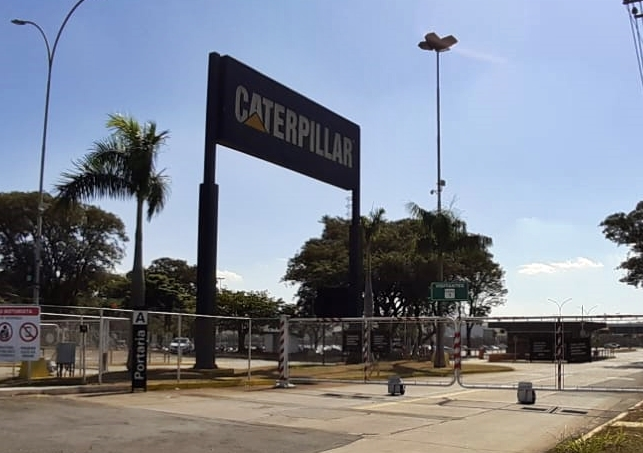
Caterpillar factory in Piracicaba

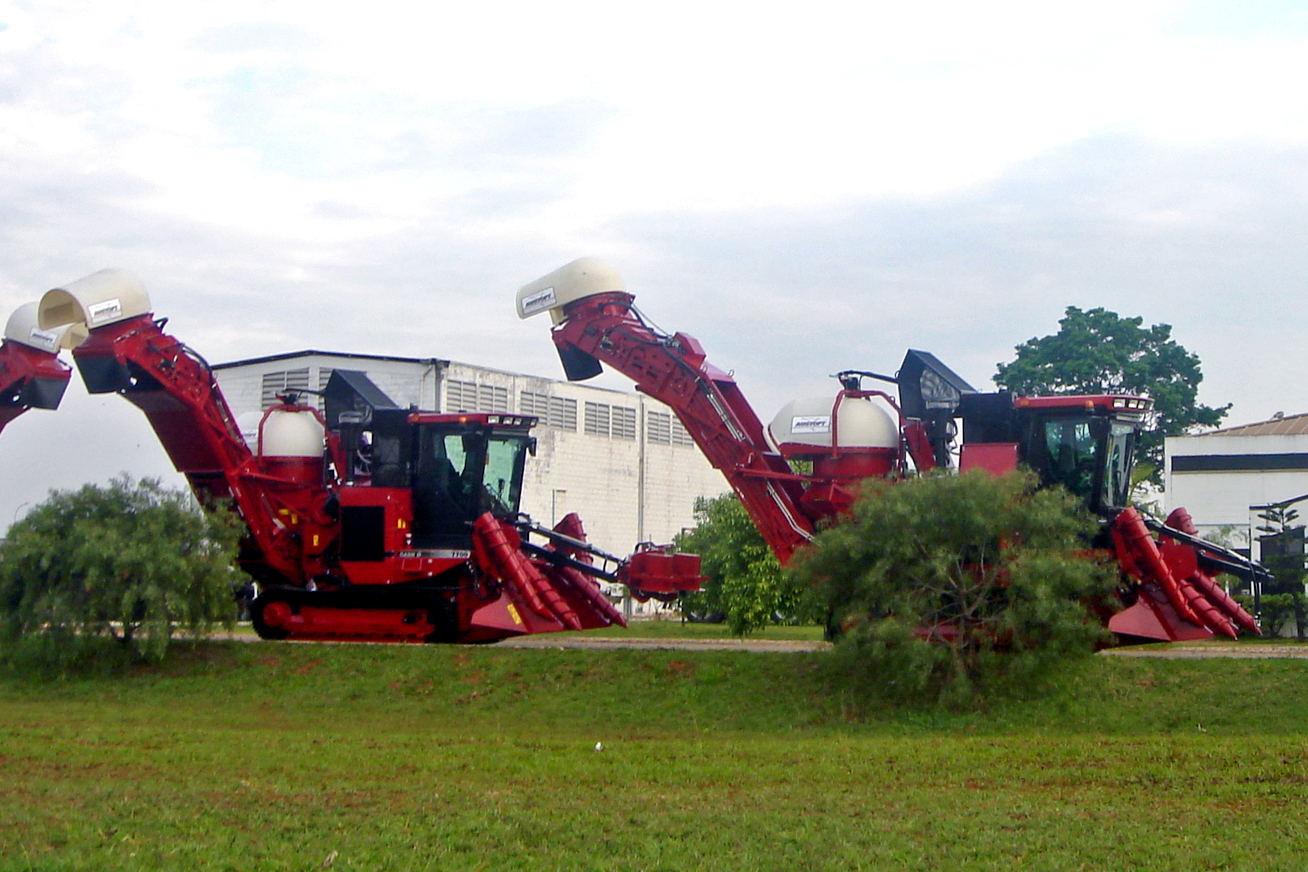
Harvesters at the yard of Case IH, a CNH Global company, located in Piracicaba.

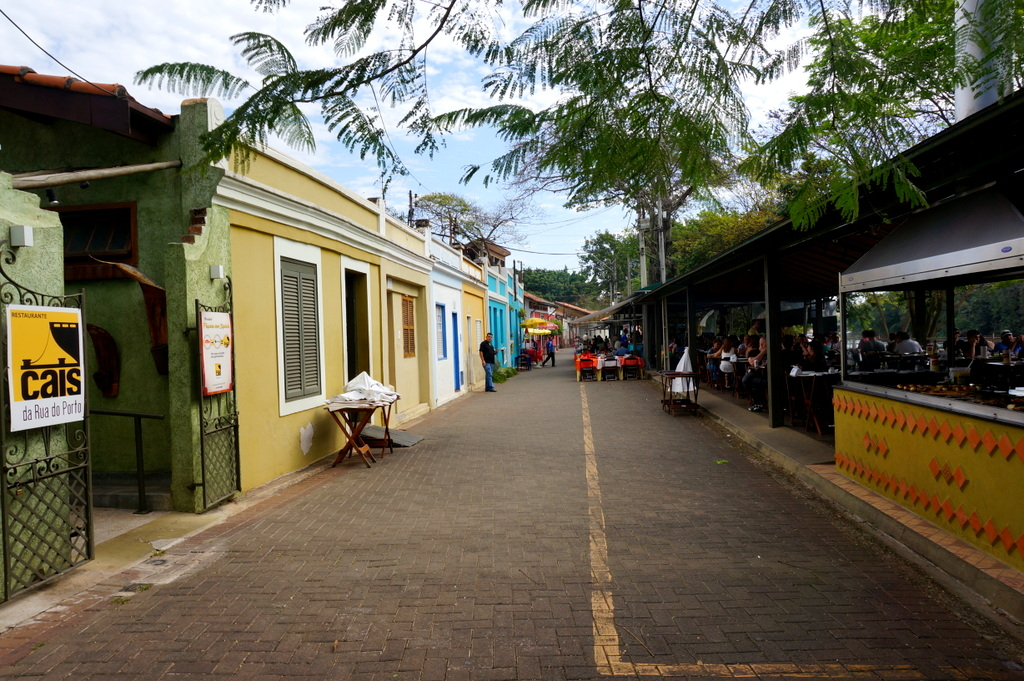
Rua do Porto

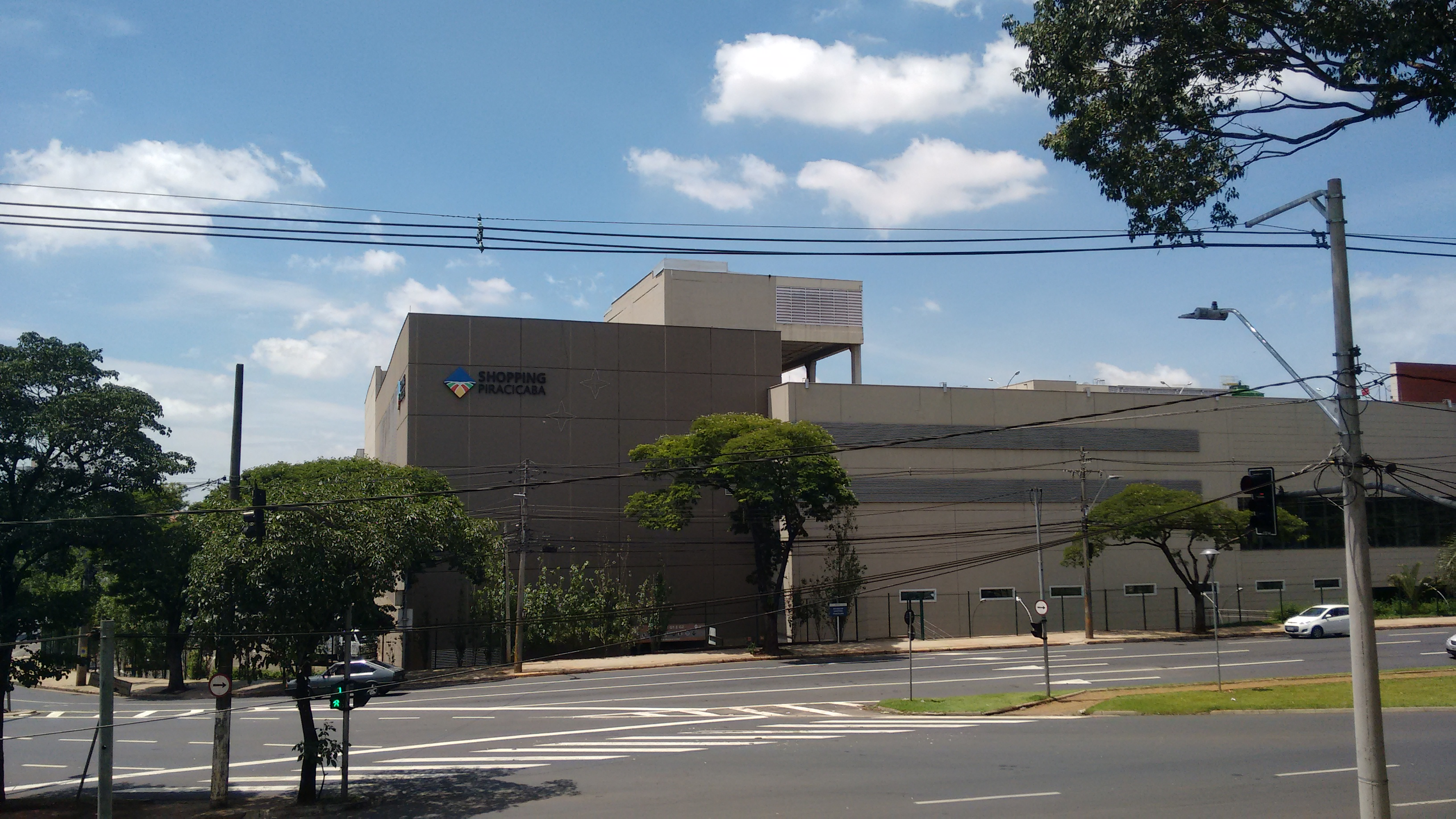
Piracicaba Shopping Mall

In 2012, Piracicaba’s gross domestic product (GDP) was the highest in the Piracicaba Microregion, the 14th highest in São Paulo state, and the 52nd highest in Brazil. According to IBGE data for 2012, the municipality’s GDP was R$11,887,388 thousand, with R$1,962,724 thousand from net product taxes at current prices. The per capita GDP was R$32,135.11. In 2000, the Human Development Index (HDI) for income was 0.795, compared to Brazil’s 0.723 that year. Piracicaba ranks as the fifth city in São Paulo state for export value.

According to IBGE, in 2010, the city had 15,055 local units and 14,522 active companies and commercial establishments. The total number of persons employed was 138,654, with 118,295 categorized as salaried employees. Salaries and other remunerations totaled R$2,925,666 thousand, and the average monthly salary in the municipality was 3.8 minimum wages. Until the 1950s, Piracicaba’s economy was heavily dependent on agriculture. This, combined with the rapid development of the Campinas Metropolitan Region (RMC), led to financial challenges. However, the construction of highways and investments in agroindustry helped reverse this situation. The agricultural sector shifted focus to sugar and ethanol production. In addition to this significant agricultural activity, Piracicaba is a major industrial hub in the region and hosts several universities.

Primary sector

According to IBGE, in 2012, agriculture was the least significant sector of Piracicaba’s economy. Of the city’s total GDP, R$171,392 thousand was the gross added value of agriculture. In 2013, IBGE reported approximately 52,477 cattle, 1,257 horses, 165 buffaloes, 7,240 pigs, 319 goats, and 3,965 sheep. There were 4,800,000 poultry, including 4,709,920 roosters, pullets, chickens, and chicks, 90,080 hens, and 460 quails, producing 1,323 thousand dozen eggs and 8 thousand quail eggs. 6,050 cows were milked, yielding 10,237 thousand liters of milk. A total of 635 sheep were sheared, producing 1,410 kilograms of wool. In temporary crop farming, sugarcane was cultivated on 52,800 hectares, yielding 4,224,000 tons in 2013. Watermelons were planted on 310 hectares, producing 9,300 tons, and corn was grown on 1,790 hectares, yielding 14,130 tons.

Despite its limited economic contribution, Piracicaba is considered a potential hub for agroindustry. Sugarcane has long been central to the city’s economy. In the 1950s, the city relied heavily on it, and as the city grew, investments were made to create more jobs, including modernizing the harvest process and advancing biotechnology.

Secondary sector

In 2012, industry was the second most significant sector of Piracicaba’s economy, contributing R$3,248,627 thousand to the municipal GDP as the gross added value of the industrial sector. Key industries include metallurgy, mechanics, textiles, food, and fuels (production of petrochemicals and ethanol). Sugarcane, the primary source of income for the primary sector, provides raw materials for ethanol and alcohol production, making Piracicaba one of the world’s leading sugar and ethanol hubs. These sectors saw significant growth in the latter half of the 20th century due to investments aimed at addressing unemployment.

One of the region’s main industrial parks is located in Piracicaba and played a crucial role in improving infrastructure and employment conditions in the late 20th century. The Uninorte Industrial District hosts 72 associated companies and covers nearly 1 million square meters. Its proximity to the Ring Road provides direct access to the Anhanguera Highway and Bandeirantes Highway.

Tertiary sector

In 2012, the provision of services contributed R$3,248,627 thousand to Piracicaba’s GDP, making it the largest contributor to the municipal economy. Commerce in the city began to develop and gain economic significance during the first half of the 20th century. In 1941, the Professional Association of Retail Trade was established, becoming a trade union in 1942 and known as SINCOMÉRCIO Piracicaba, which coordinates the commercial sector. In the 1970s, the Social Service of Commerce (SESC) arrived in Piracicaba, and in the 1980s, a National Commercial Learning Service (SENAC) unit was established.

== Urban infrastructure ==
=== Healthcare ===
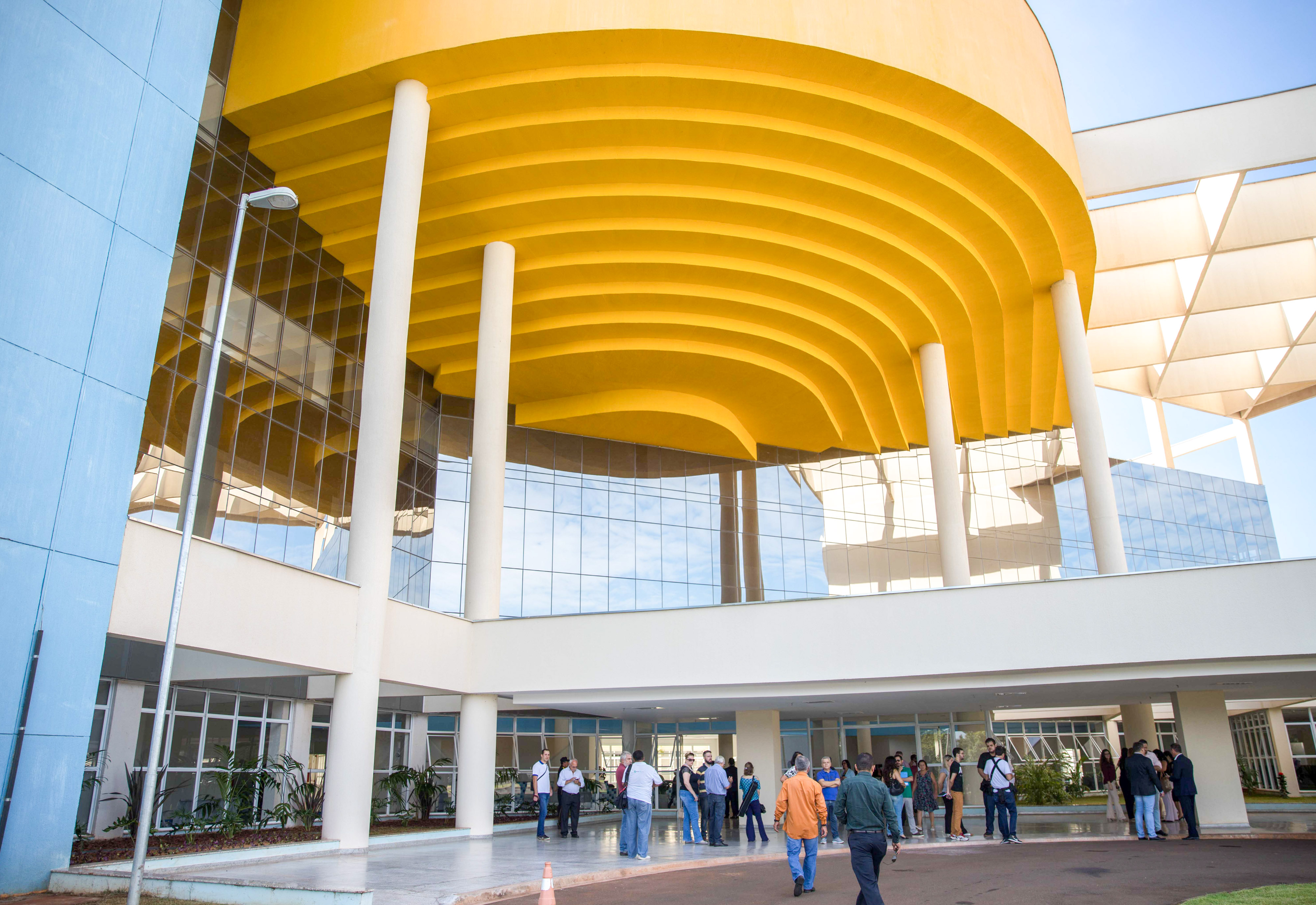
Piracicaba Regional Hospital

In 2009, Piracicaba had 241 healthcare facilities, including hospitals, emergency rooms, health centers, and dental services, with 101 public and 140 private facilities. These facilities provided 732 beds for hospitalization, with 10 in public facilities and 722 in private ones. In 2011, 98.5% of children under one year old had up-to-date vaccination records. In 2010, 4,736 births were recorded, with an infant mortality rate of 12.9 per thousand children under one year old, and 99.9% of live births were attended by qualified health professionals. In the same year, 12.9% of pregnant women were girls under 20 years old. A total of 22,055 children were weighed by the Family Health Program, with 0.6% classified as malnourished.

The Piracicaba Municipal Health Secretariat (SEMS) is directly linked to the Municipal Government and is responsible for maintaining and operating the Unified Health System (SUS), as well as developing policies, programs, and projects to promote municipal health. For emergencies, the city has four Emergency Care Units (UPAMs in the Vila Cristina, Vila Sônia, and Piracicamirim neighborhoods), as well as the Mobile Emergency Care Service (SAMU) and the Orthopedics and Traumatology Center (COT). Support services include the Day Hospital, the Municipal Physiotherapy Center, the Integrated Health Secretariat Transport Service (SITSS), Sanitary Surveillance (VISA), Epidemiological Surveillance, and the Coordination of Food and Nutrition Programs (CPAN). Primary care services in Piracicaba include the Family Health Program (PSF), Basic Health Units (UBS), and the Family Health Program.

== Education ==
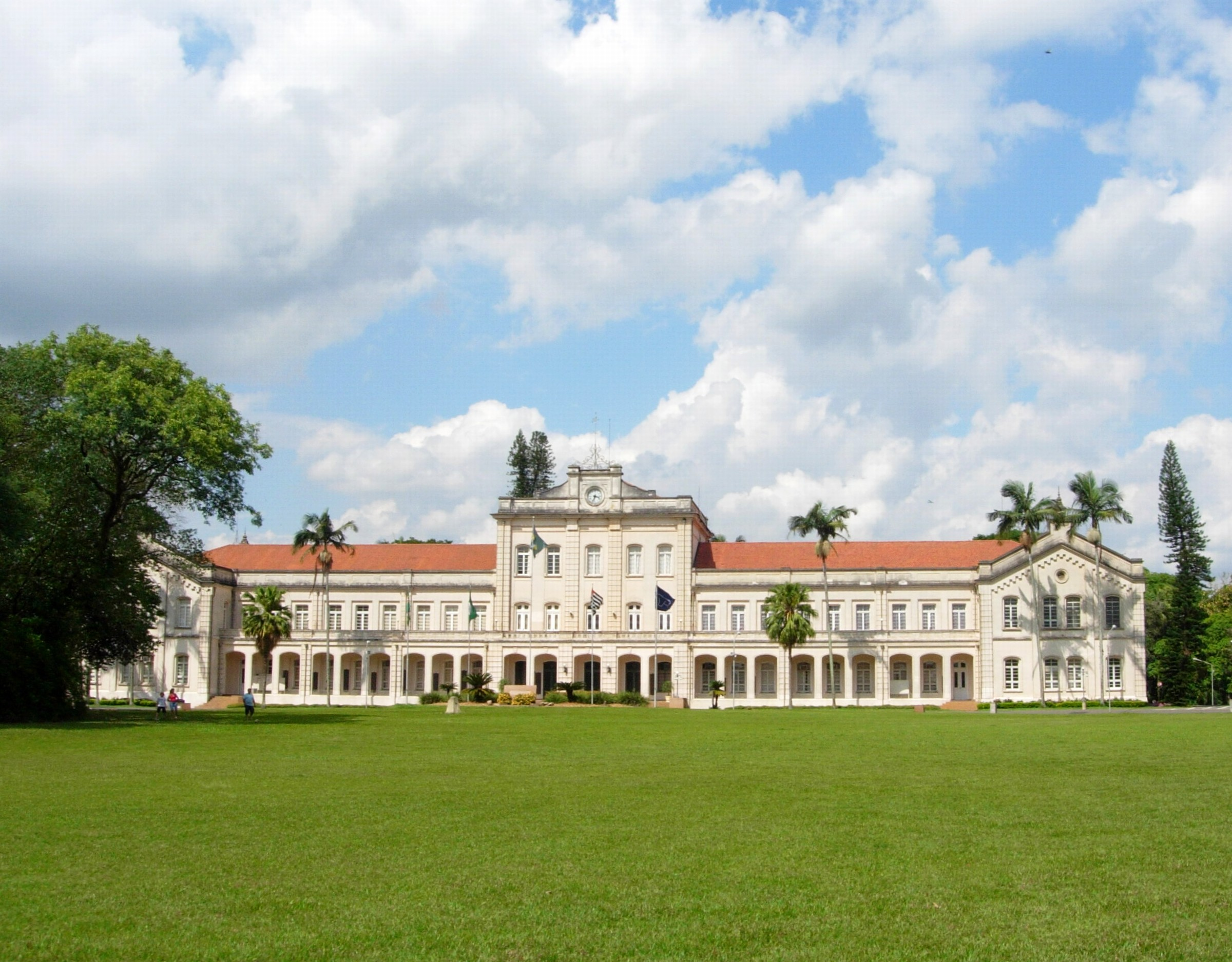
Central building of the Luiz de Queiroz College of Agriculture (ESALQ) at the University of São Paulo (USP)

In 2009, the average Basic Education Development Index (IDEB) among public schools in Piracicaba was 4.0 (on a scale from 1 to 10), equivalent to the average for municipal and state schools across Brazil. Among private institutions, this index rises to 6.1. The Human Development Index (HDI) for education was 0.913 (classified as very high), compared to Brazil's 0.849.

In 2009, the municipality recorded approximately 73,658 enrollments in public and private school systems. According to the Brazilian Institute of Geography and Statistics (IBGE), in the same year, of the 115 primary schools, 54 were part of the municipal public system, 36 were state public schools, and 25 were private institutions. Among the 41 secondary schools, 46 were state public schools, 1 was a municipal public school, and 19 were private. In 2000, 4.1% of children aged 7 to 14 were not enrolled in primary education. The completion rate for youths aged 15 to 17 in that year was 61.2%. The literacy rate for the population aged 15 and older in 2010 was 96.9%. In 2006, for every 100 girls in primary education, there were 111 boys.

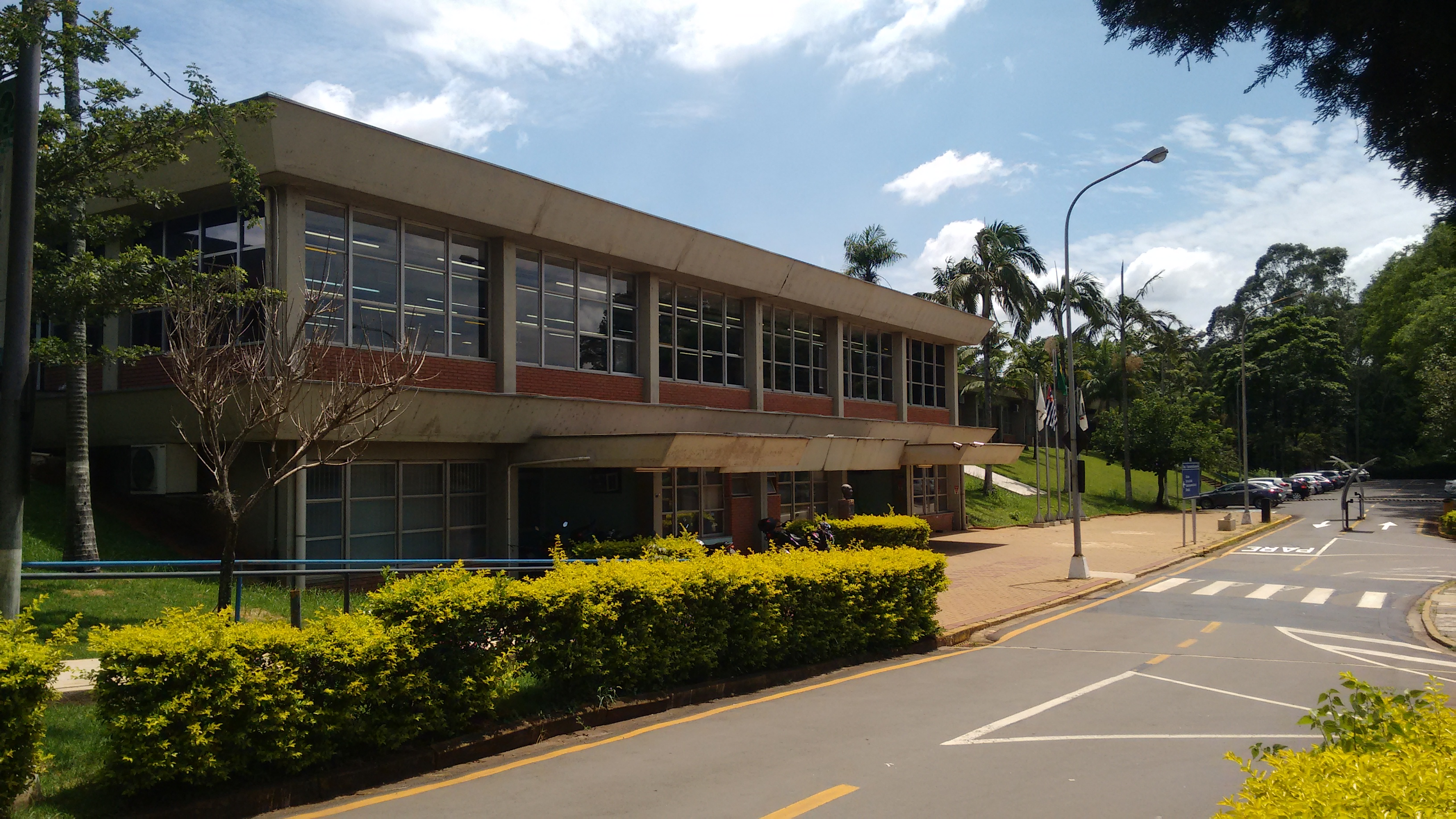
Entrance to the main building of the Piracicaba School of Dentistry (FOP) of the State University of Campinas (Unicamp)

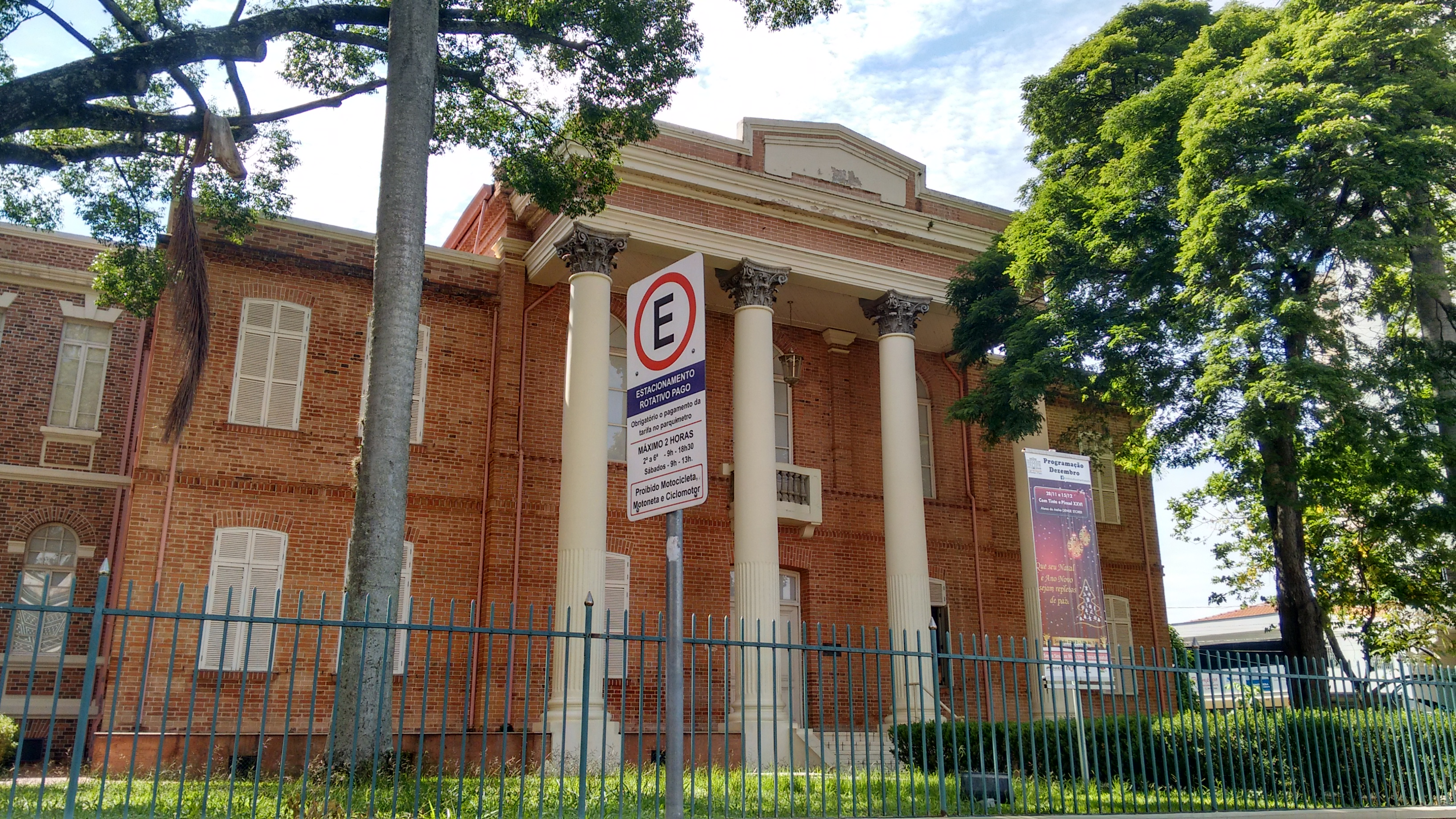
Central Campus of the Methodist University of Piracicaba (Unimep)

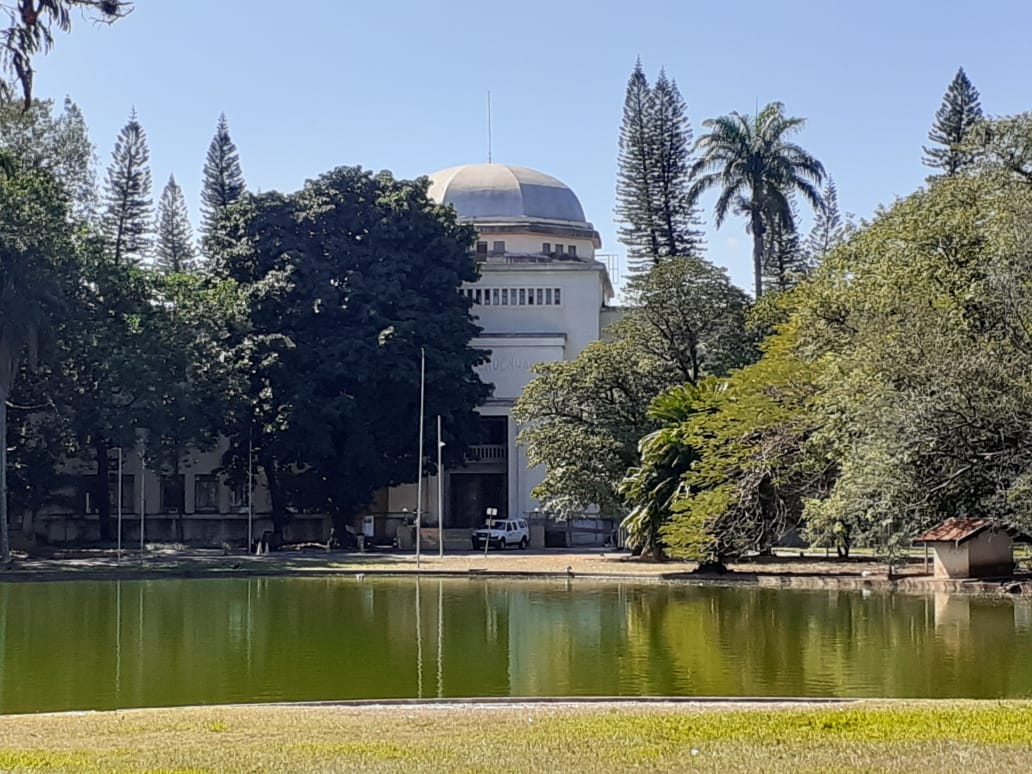
Engineering Pavilion of ESALQ

The Municipal Education Secretariat aims to coordinate and provide administrative and pedagogical support to Piracicaba’s school system. Notable programs include the Youth and Adult Education (EJA), a free education network for adults who have not completed primary education, and the Special Education network, where students with physical disabilities are supported by specialized teachers. The city is home to prominent university centers, including the Luiz de Queiroz College of Agriculture (ESALQ) and the Center for Nuclear Energy in Agriculture (CENA), both part of the University of São Paulo (USP), the Piracicaba School of Dentistry of the State University of Campinas (UNICAMP), the Methodist University of Piracicaba (UNIMEP), the Piracicaba Technology College (FATEC), and the Municipal Education Foundation, which supports the Piracicaba Engineering School and a campus of the Federal Institute of São Paulo. Other private colleges in the city include Dom Bosco College, Anhanguera College of Piracicaba, and Anhembi Morumbi University.

Education in Piracicaba by numbers
Level	Enrollments	Teachers	Schools (Total)
Early childhood education	8,427	679	148
Primary education	50,187	2,212	115
Secondary education	15,044	1,039	61

== Science and technology ==
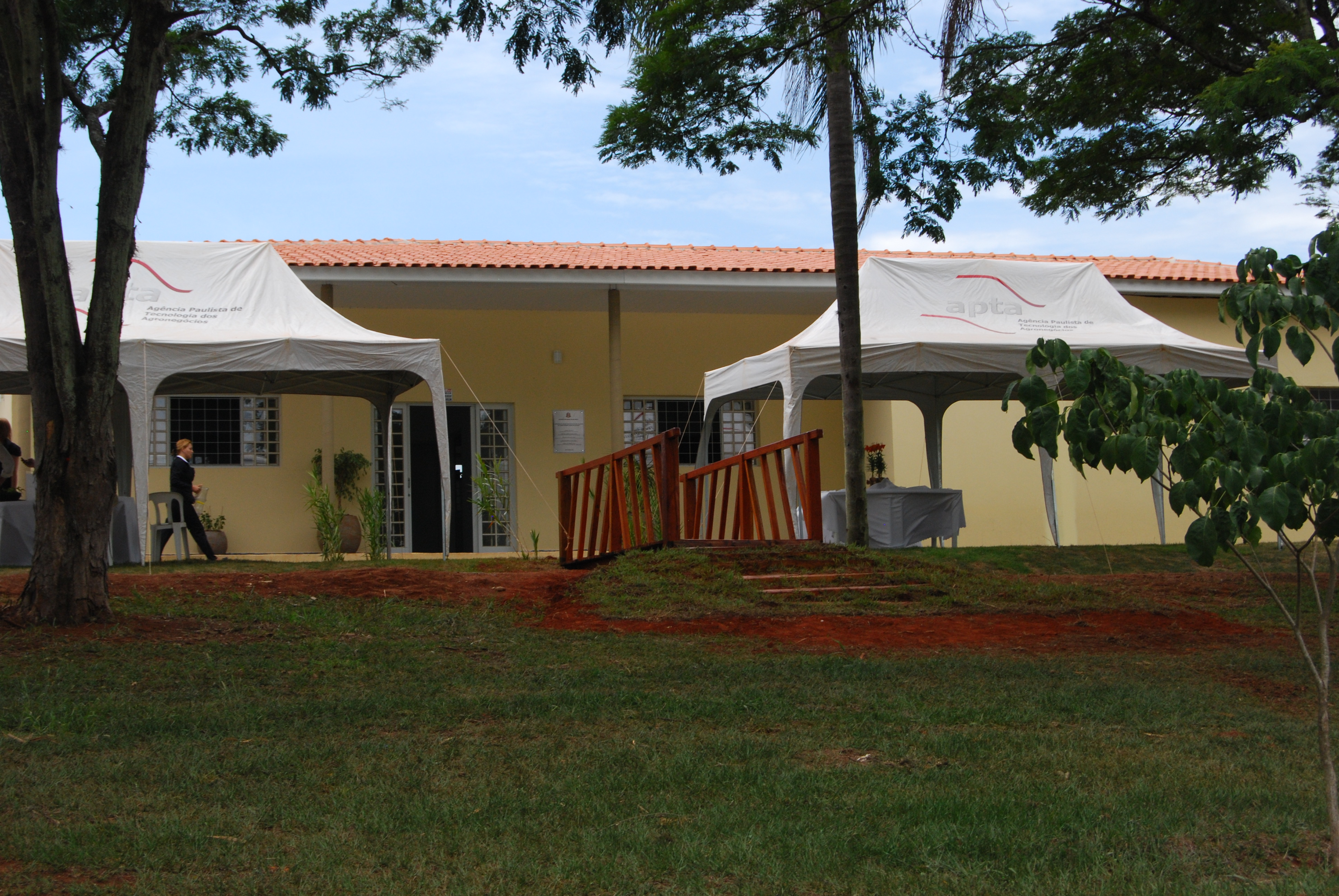
Dr. Paulo Rogério Palma de Oliveira Sugarcane Technological Analysis Laboratory, inaugurated in December 2010 by the Secretariat of Agriculture and Supply.

As a hub for scientific development, Piracicaba attracts numerous visitors interested in the technology being developed. Several high-complexity educational and research institutions, some internationally recognized, are based or represented in the city, including the Luiz de Queiroz College of Agriculture of the University of São Paulo (USP), the Piracicaba School of Dentistry of the State University of Campinas, the Methodist University of Piracicaba (UNIMEP), Anhembi Morumbi University, and the Piracicaba Campus of the Deputy Roque Trevisan Technology College (FATEC), as well as the Maria Imaculada Integrated Colleges, the Piracicaba Municipal Education Foundation (FUMEP), Piracicaba Technology College (FATEP), Dom Bosco Salesian College, Virtual University of the State of São Paulo (UNIVESP), Anglo College, Anhanguera College, International University Center (UNINTER), and the Federal Institute of Education, Science and Technology (IFSP). The city is considered a regional center for professional training, offering a wide variety of technical courses.

In addition to academic institutions, the city hosts a significant technological park, the Piracicaba Technological Park, focused on technological information, facilitating integration among research centers, universities, and businesses, and supporting the development of entrepreneurial activities. Another prominent sector is the production of biofuels, with the region accounting for approximately 65% of the equipment used in the national sugar-alcohol industry. The production of ethanol, alcohol, and biodiesel benefits both rural workers and research and biotechnology institutions.

To strengthen policies aimed at agribusiness, the Piracicaba Valley, also known as AgTechValley, was recently launched. Inspired by Silicon Valley, it has the Luiz de Queiroz College of Agriculture (ESALQ) as a reference.

This project aims to bolster policies for the agribusiness sector, attracting investments to solidify the municipality’s prominent position in agricultural technology development. Notably, 65% of the equipment supplied to the sugar-alcohol industry originates from this municipality.

== Public safety and crime ==
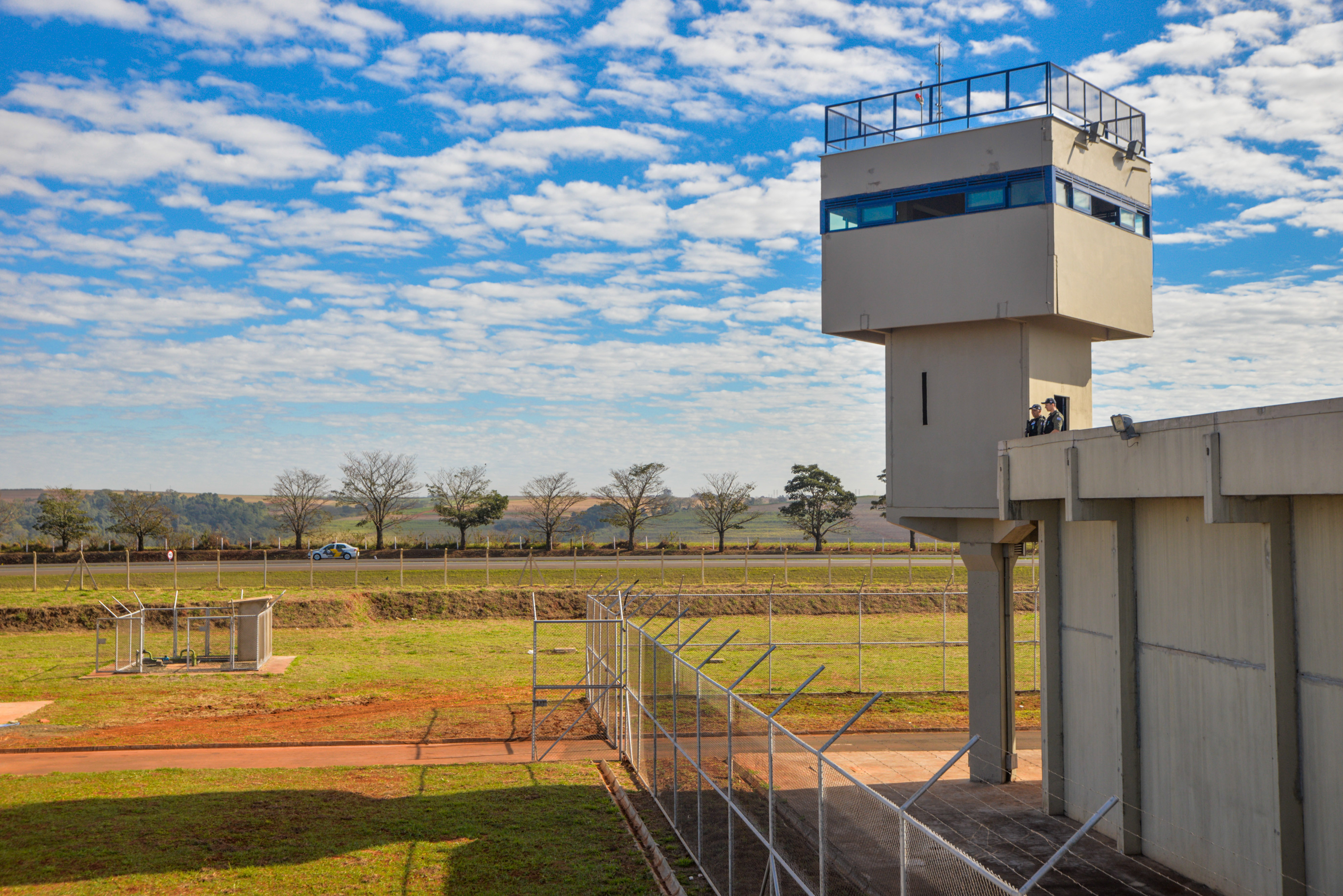
"Nelson Furlan" Provisional Detention Center

As in most medium and large Brazilian municipalities, crime remains a challenge in Piracicaba, with the city being one of the regions where crime rates have recently increased significantly. In 2008, the homicide rate in the municipality was 41.8 per 100,000 young people, ranking 23rd in the state and 261st nationally. The suicide rate that year was 7.4 per 100,000 inhabitants, placing it 55th in the state and 653rd nationally.

The Piracicaba Municipal Security Council (CMS) is tasked with proposing measures and activities to enhance municipal security, comprising representatives (both primary and alternates) from various entities. Various public agencies are involved, including the São Paulo State Military Police, the São Paulo State Civil Police, the Municipal Civil Guard, the Guardianship Council, and the Brazilian Bar Association (OAB). The University Guard, for instance, conducts patrols and surveillance within the University City campuses in the city’s West Zone. Pursuant to the Brazilian Federal Constitution, Piracicaba also has a Municipal Guard, responsible for protecting the municipality’s assets, services, and public facilities, established under Article 58 of Law No. 16 of 13 November 1891, approved on 25 April 1903.

== Housing, services, and communication ==
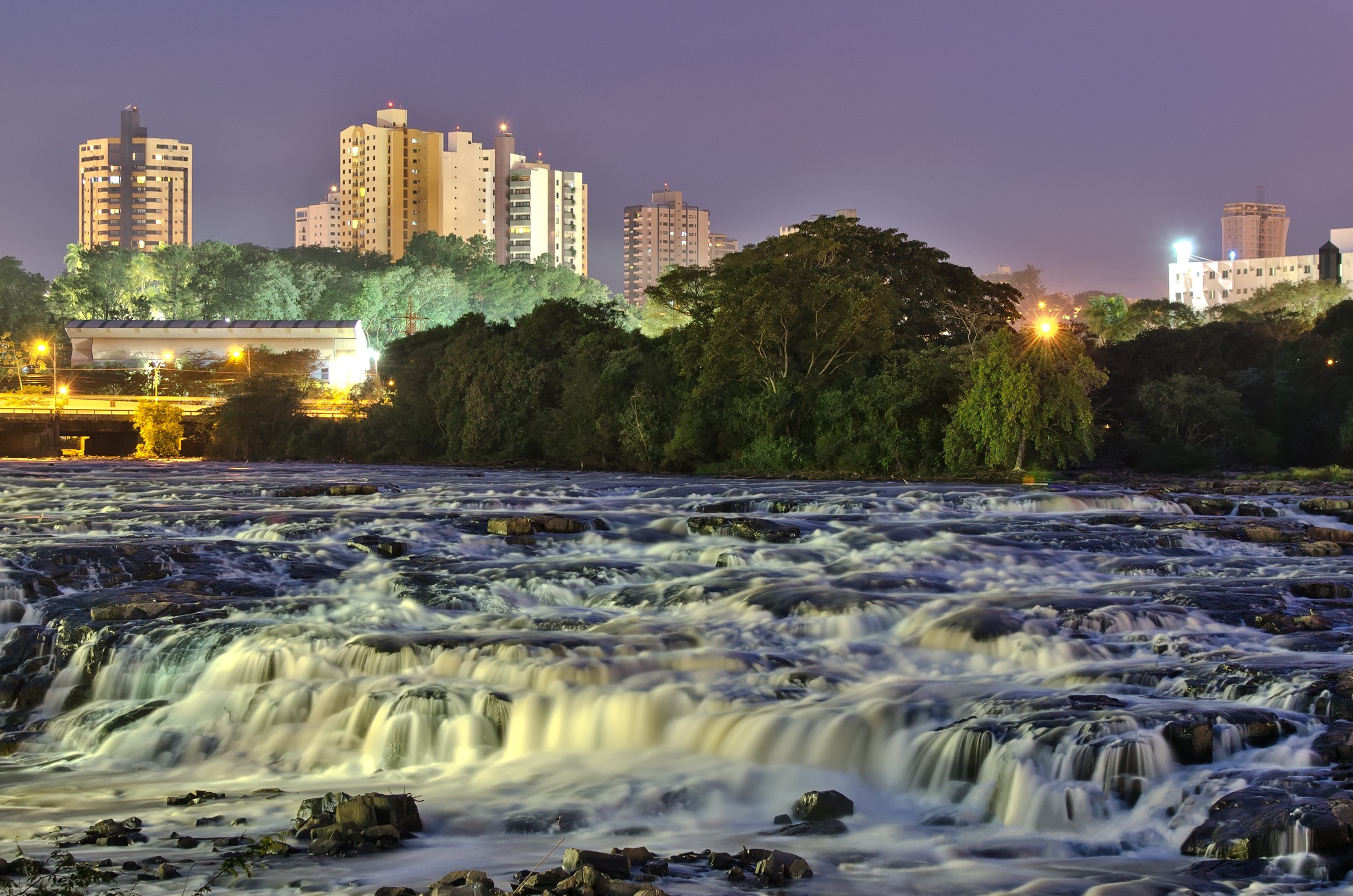
Night view of the Piracicaba River with the city in the background. Electricity supply is provided by Companhia Paulista de Força e Luz (CPFL Paulista).

According to the 2022 Brazilian census, in 2022, the city had 190,944 permanent private households, comprising 115,223 houses, 36,569 apartments, 3,266 houses in villages or condominiums, 109 tenements, and 261 households in degraded or unfinished structures. Per the IBGE, in 2022, 155,428 permanent private households were occupied, 24,501 were vacant, and 10,273 were for occasional use. Most of the municipality has access to treated water, electricity, sewage, urban cleaning, fixed telephony, and mobile telephony. In that year, 98.67% of households were served by the general water supply network; 99.75% had waste collection services; and 97.02% of residences were connected to the sewage network.

Piracicaba’s first water supply system began planning in 1824 by the Municipal Chamber. In May 1886, construction started on a 2-million-liter reservoir in the Alemães neighborhood, managed by the Piracicaba Hydraulic Company. The Municipal Water and Sewage Service (SEMAE Piracicaba) was established on 30 April 1969, under Municipal Law No. 1657, and is currently responsible for the city’s water supply, operating three intake stations: two on the Piracicaba River and one on the Corumbataí River. However, the Piracicaba River is experiencing reduced water levels. Urban, industrial, and agricultural development in the region has increased water demand beyond availability, with the river also supplying part of the São Paulo Metropolitan Region. SEMAE also manages sewage collection, with waste treated at two sewage treatment plants (ETE): the smaller-capacity Dois Córregos Sewage Treatment Plant, inaugurated in December 1992, and the primary Piracicamirim Sewage Treatment Plant, opened in June 1998.

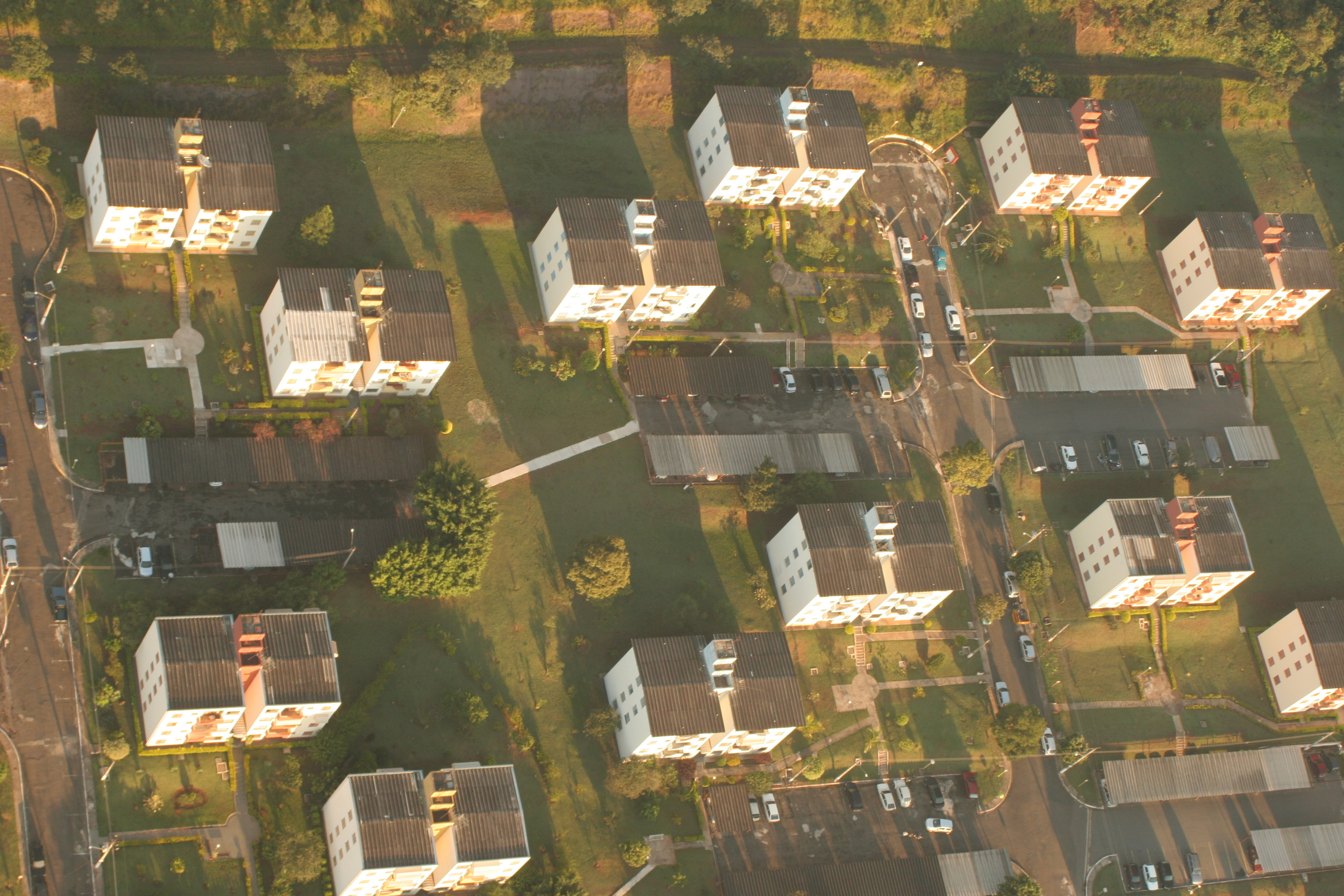
Aerial view of public housing in Piracicaba

The Companhia Paulista de Força e Luz (CPFL Paulista) is responsible for electricity supply in Piracicaba, serving 234 other municipalities in the interior of São Paulo. In 2010, 99.93% of the municipality’s households were served by this service. Fiber optic internet and broadband (ADSL) services are offered by various internet providers. For fixed telephony, the city was initially served by CIPATEL - Paulista Telecommunications Company, which built the first telephone exchange still in use today. In 1975, the DDD system was implemented, and in 1977, services were taken over by Telecomunicações de São Paulo (TELESP). In 1998, TELESP was privatized and sold to Telefônica, adopting the Vivo brand in 2012. Piracicaba’s area code (DDD) is 019, and its Postal Code (CEP) ranges from 13400-001 to 13439-999.

Several high-definition television (HDTV) channels are available, with major networks having affiliates in the city or nearby, such as EPTV Campinas (TV Globo), TV Thathi Campinas (RecordTV), Band Mais, VTV (SBT), TV Jornal, and TV Ativa. Piracicaba also has several newspapers, including A Tribuna de Piracicaba, Gazeta de Piracicaba, and Jornal de Piracicaba. Major radio stations include Rádio Educadora AM, Rádio Difusora, Jovem Pan News, Jovem Pan, Rádio 92 FM, Onda Livre FM, and Rádio Educativa de Piracicaba FM.

== Transport ==
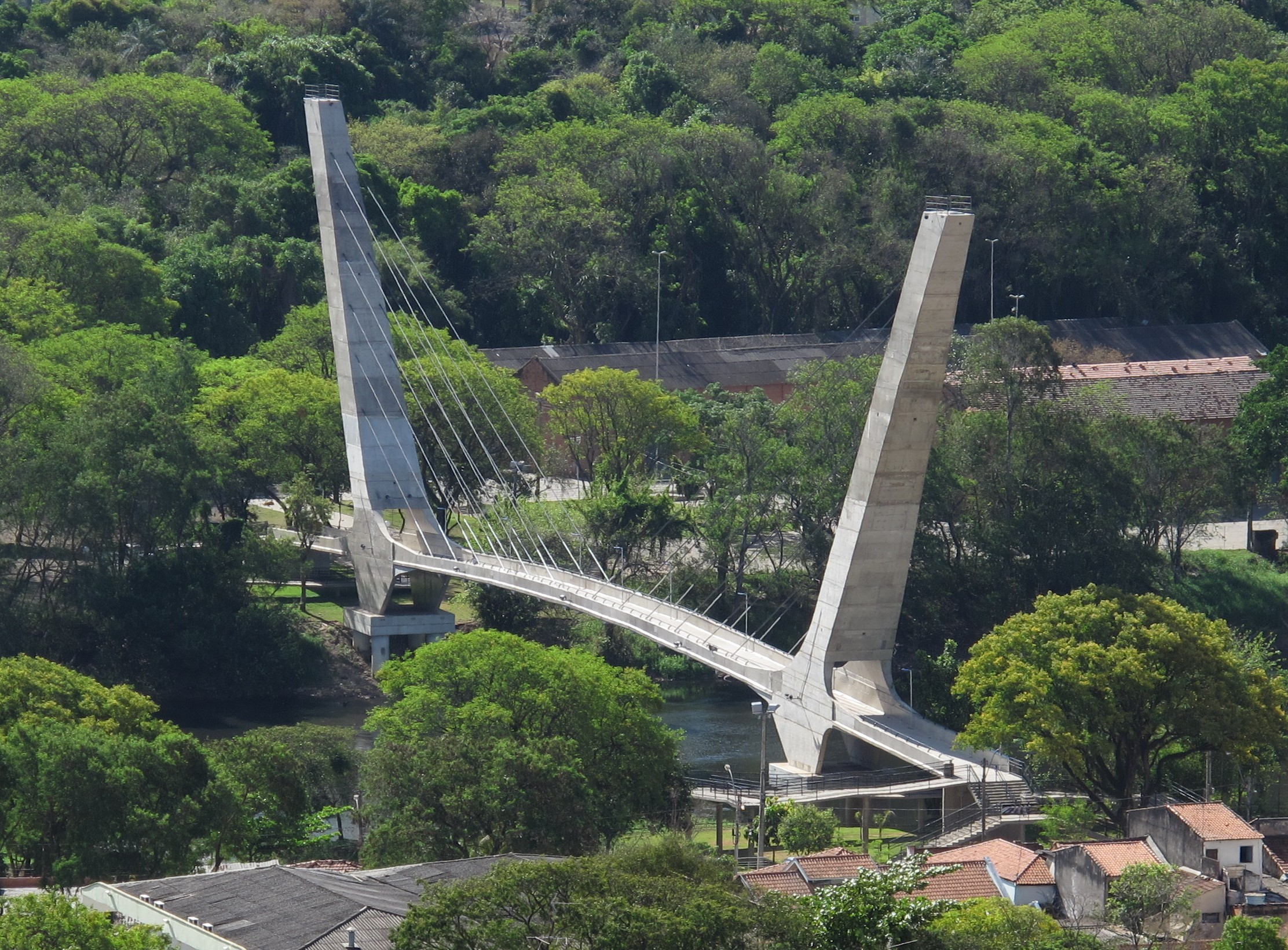
Pedestrian bridge over the Piracicaba River

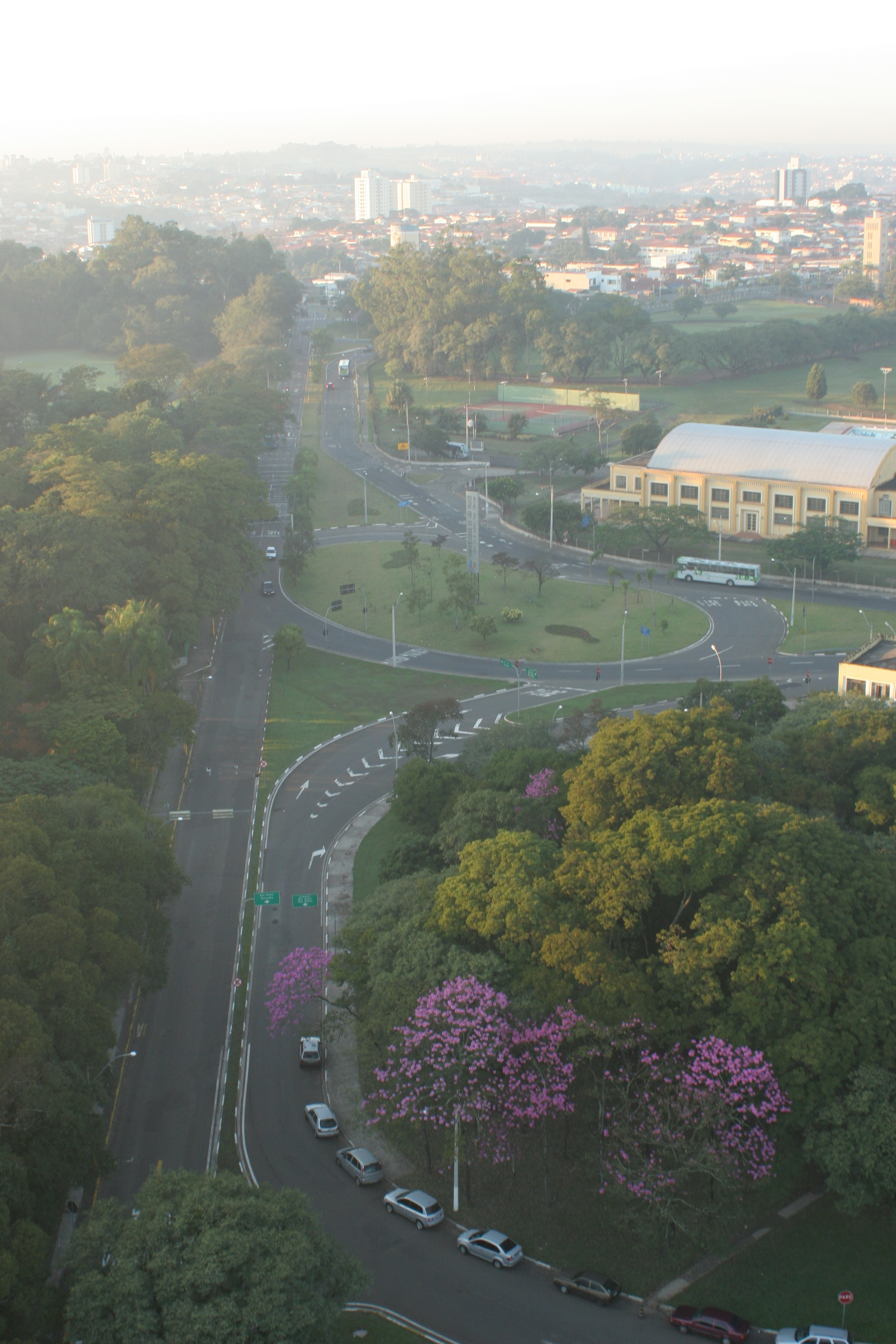
Intersection of avenues in Piracicaba

The city’s airport, Comendador Pedro Morganti State Airport, is managed by the São Paulo State Aviation Department (DAESP) and handles only small-scale flights, serving domestic non-commercial operations. It features an asphalt runway, 1,000 meters long with nighttime lighting, a 175 m² passenger terminal, and parking for 65 vehicles. The airport is also home to charter flights, skydiving schools and a pilot training school.

The first railway to reach Piracicaba was the Piracicaba Branch of the Ytuana Railway Company, with the city’s first railway station inaugurated on 20 February 1877, when Piracicaba consisted of only four blocks and public lighting relied on kerosene lamps. The first train arrived on 19 May of that year. A new station was opened on 6 January 1885, renovated in 1943, and served as the main station until the early 1990s, when it was replaced by the Urban Bus Terminal. During its operation, it was managed by the Ytuana Railway Company, the Sorocabana Railway, and the Ferrovia Paulista S/A (FEPASA).

In 1922, 45 years after the arrival of the Ytuana Railway Company, the Piracicaba Branch of the Paulista Railway Company reached Piracicaba, with the significant Piracicaba Paulista Station inaugurated on 30 July 1922. The station was owned by the Paulista Railway Company until 1971 and by FEPASA until 1998, when it was deactivated. Today, the site houses municipal parks and sports courts.

Rail transport in Piracicaba, as in much of São Paulo state, declined due to the rise of road and air transport, particularly in the first half of the 1990s. Currently, there are only projects aimed at preserving the heritage of the city’s main stations.

Piracicaba has a robust road network connecting it to various cities in the interior of São Paulo and the state capital, with access to major state and national highways via paved, dual-lane secondary roads, such as the Bandeirantes Highway and the Anhanguera Highway. The Piracicaba Bus Terminal is one of the region’s main terminals, inaugurated in the 1990s, with passenger traffic increasing by 30% to 40% during holidays and peak travel seasons. The following highways pass through the municipality: Luiz de Queiroz Highway (SP-304); Geraldo de Barros Highway (SP-304); Fausto Santomauro Highway (SP-127); Cornélio Pires Highway (SP-127); Deputy Laércio Corte Highway (SP-147); Samuel de Castro Neves Highway (SP-147); Sugar Highway (SP-308).

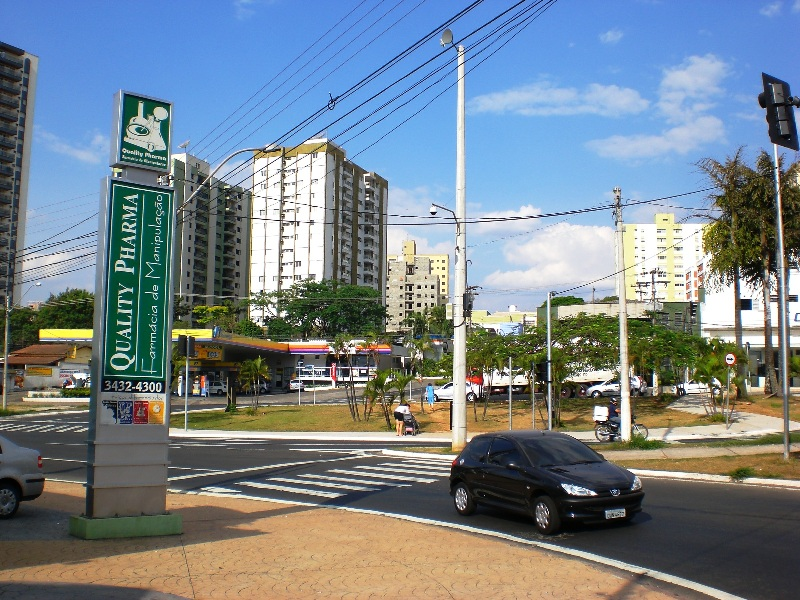
Independence Avenue

The Municipal Transit and Transport Secretariat (Semuttran) oversees the control and maintenance of the municipality’s traffic, from monitoring public roads and driver and pedestrian behavior to developing traffic engineering projects, paving, constructing roadworks, and managing services such as taxis, alternative transport, buses, chartered vehicles, and school transport.

In 2014, the municipal vehicle fleet totaled 277,008 vehicles, including 167,039 cars, 7,920 trucks, 2,582 tractor-trucks, 21,047 pickups, 9,747 vans, 951 minibuses, 49,681 motorcycles, 5,743 scooters, 1,484 buses, 56 wheeled tractors, and 1,614 utility vehicles. Dual-lane paved avenues and numerous traffic lights facilitate city traffic, but the increase in vehicles over the past decade has led to increasingly slow traffic, particularly in the municipal seat. Additionally, finding parking spaces in the commercial center has become challenging, causing some losses to local commerce.

The city has dozens of urban and intercity bus lines, connecting nearby cities such as Mombuca, Tietê, Laranjal Paulista, Anhembi, Cordeirópolis, Cerquilho, Elias Fausto, Torrinha, and Conchas. As of August 2011, 220 of the municipal bus fleet were adapted for people with physical disabilities, with the public transport system serving an average of 2.9 million passengers.

== Culture ==
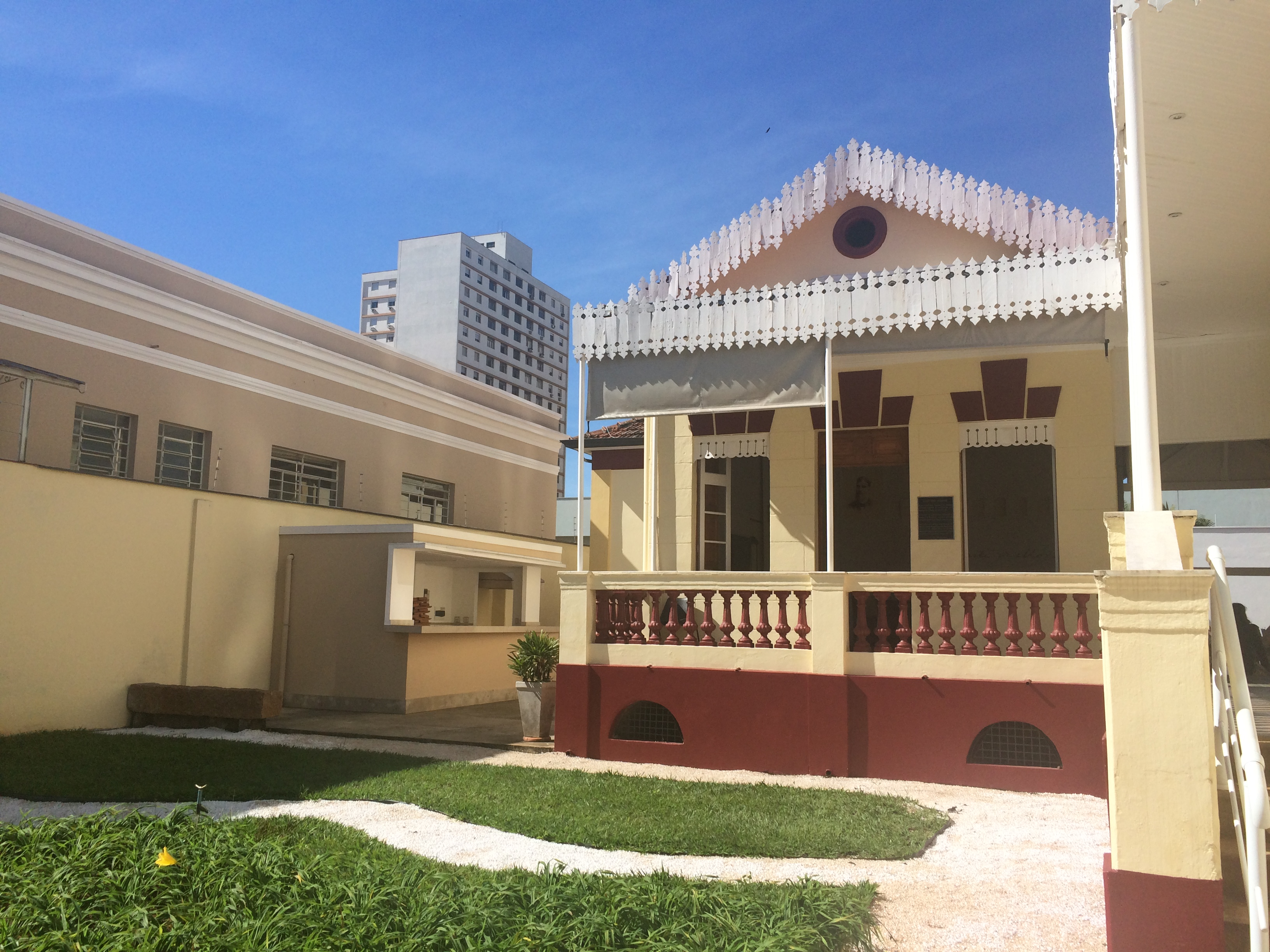
Prudente de Moraes Historical and Pedagogical Museum

The Secretariat of Cultural Action of the Municipality of Piracicaba (SEMAC) is responsible for the city’s cultural sector, tasked with planning and executing the municipality’s cultural policy through programs, projects, and activities aimed at cultural development. It was established under Decree No. 1,655 of 22 January 1992. The Sports, Leisure, and Motor Activities Secretariat (SELAM) also oversees specific areas of Piracicaba’s culture, such as leisure activities and sports practices.

Other institutions in the municipality, supported by SEMAC, focus on cultural development. The Council for the Protection of Cultural Heritage in Piracicaba (CODEPAC), created under Law No. 4,276 of 17 June 1997, promotes municipal policies for the protection of cultural heritage. The Culture Support Fund (FAC), managed by SEMAC’s Administrative Support Nucleus, assesses the needs of cultural spaces and the Secretariat through projects and requests, forwarding this information to relevant municipal, state, and federal bodies. The Municipal Culture Conference (COMCULT) oversees and monitors public policies for Piracicaba’s cultural development. Piracicaba is also the birthplace of several nationally and internationally recognized singers, composers, and artists, including Alessandro Penezzi, Gilberto Barros, Jamil Maluf, Leonardo Villar, Henrique Fogaça, Ademar Pereira de Barros, João Vitti, Mendes Thame, Sud Mennucci, Francisco Jesuíno Avanzi, Roberto Cabrini, and many others.

=== Performing arts ===
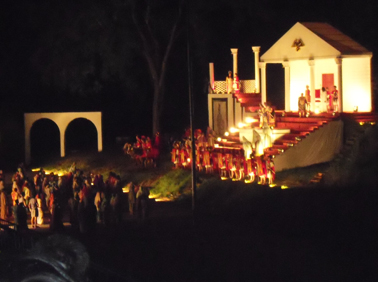
Staging of the “Passion of Christ” in Piracicaba

The city boasts several venues dedicated to cultural events in theater and music. The "Dr. Losso Netto" Municipal Theater, inaugurated on 19 August 1978 as the Piracicaba Municipal Theater, was renamed in April 1993 to honor a journalist who contributed to the growth of the city’s journalism sector. With two large halls, it has infrastructure for diverse events, including dance, music, theater performances, and lectures. The Unimep Theater, part of the Methodist University of Piracicaba, showcases a variety of artistic performances produced by the Unimep academic community and other Brazilian and international art groups.

The "Ricardo Ferraz de Arruda Pinto" Municipal Public Library, established on 2 May 1939 with a collection of 837 books, was one of the first in the interior of São Paulo. Relocated in February 1989, it moved to a purpose-built facility in 2009. Its current collection exceeds 70,000 volumes, and the new 2,770 m² building includes an amphitheater, Wi-Fi, a video room, a computer lab, a newspaper library, a microfilming section, and a children’s library. SEMAC also operates six cultural centers across the city, offering courses and activities related to crafts, music, dance, and cuisine. These activities are also held at the "Miguel Arcanjo Benício Assumpção Dutra" Municipal Art Gallery, located in the city center.

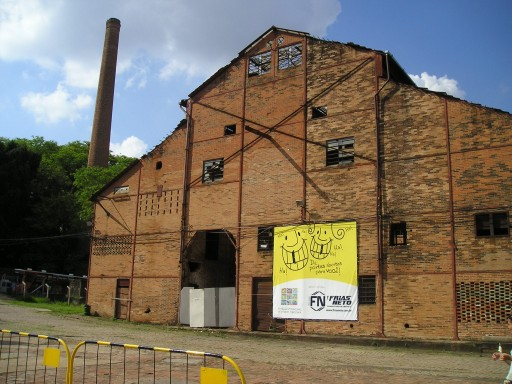
Plaque of the International Humor Exhibition at the Central Mill of Piracicaba

The Cultural Secretariat promotes various festivals and competitions, including the Piracicaba National Theater Festival (ENTEPIRA), featuring performances by numerous theater groups, the Piracicaba Dance Festival (PIRADANÇA), showcasing competitive and guest performances in genres such as ballet, contemporary dance, jazz, street dance, ballroom dance, and folk and ethnic dances, as well as the National Choral Meeting (ENACOPI) and the Literary Salon. Traditional festivals include the Feast of the Divine Holy Spirit, held since 1826; the Green Corn Festival, with country music concerts and folk group performances; the Festival of Nations, with settings, food and drink typical of the countries represented; the Polenta Festival, celebrating Trentino-Tyrolese immigration to Piracicaba; and the São João de Tupi Festival, in the style of a quadrilha, with concerts, bonfires, traditional games, and typical food and drink, including a ritual in which the locals walk barefoot over hot coals.

The Piracicaba International Humor Exhibition is an annual graphic humor festival held since 1974 at the Piracicaba Central Mill, initially as a form of resistance by graphic artists against Brazil’s military dictatorship. Now considered one of the most important graphic arts salons in the world, the competition is divided into four categories: cartoon, editorial cartoon, comic strip and caricature.

== Cultural, architectural, and natural attractions ==
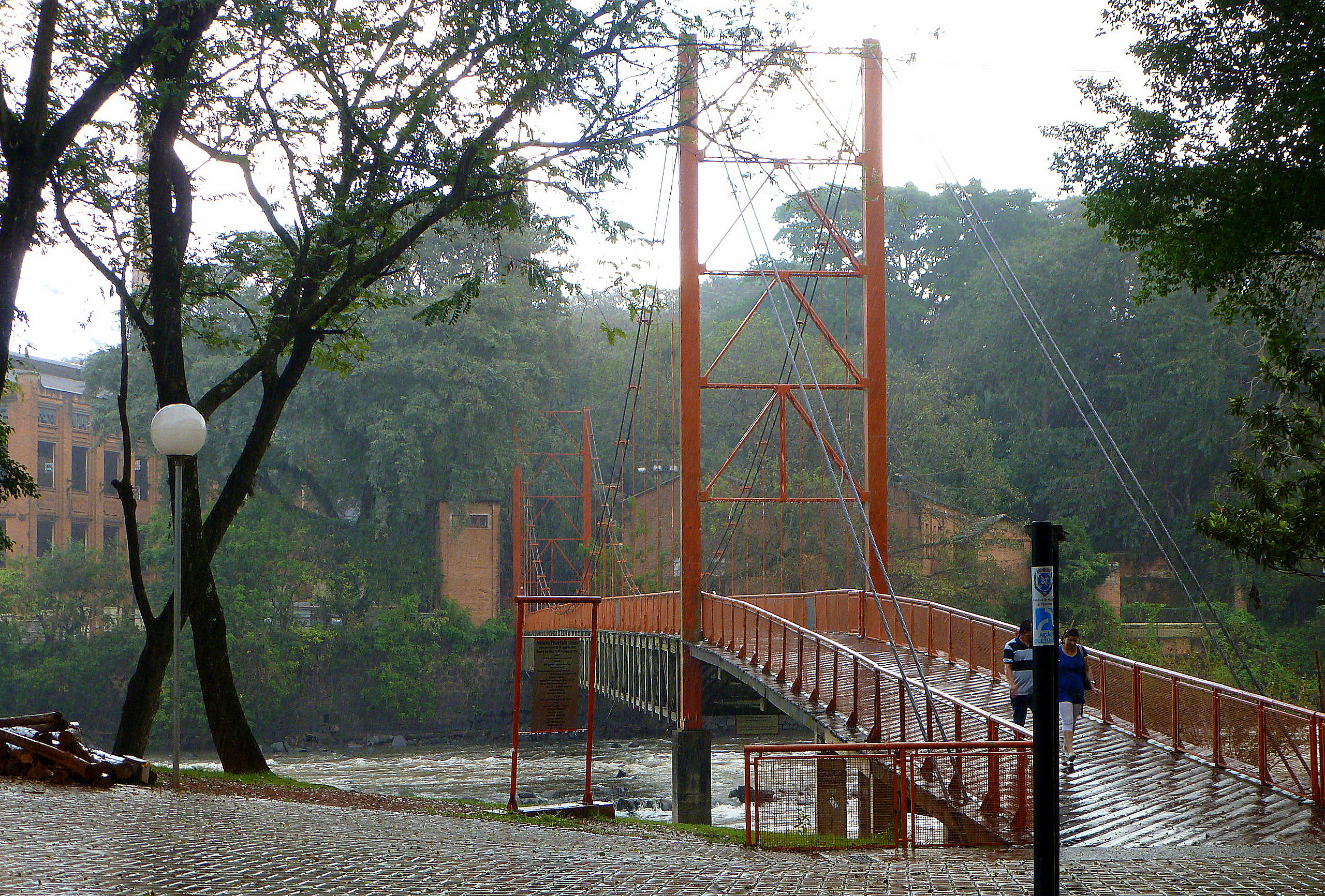
Suspension Bridge

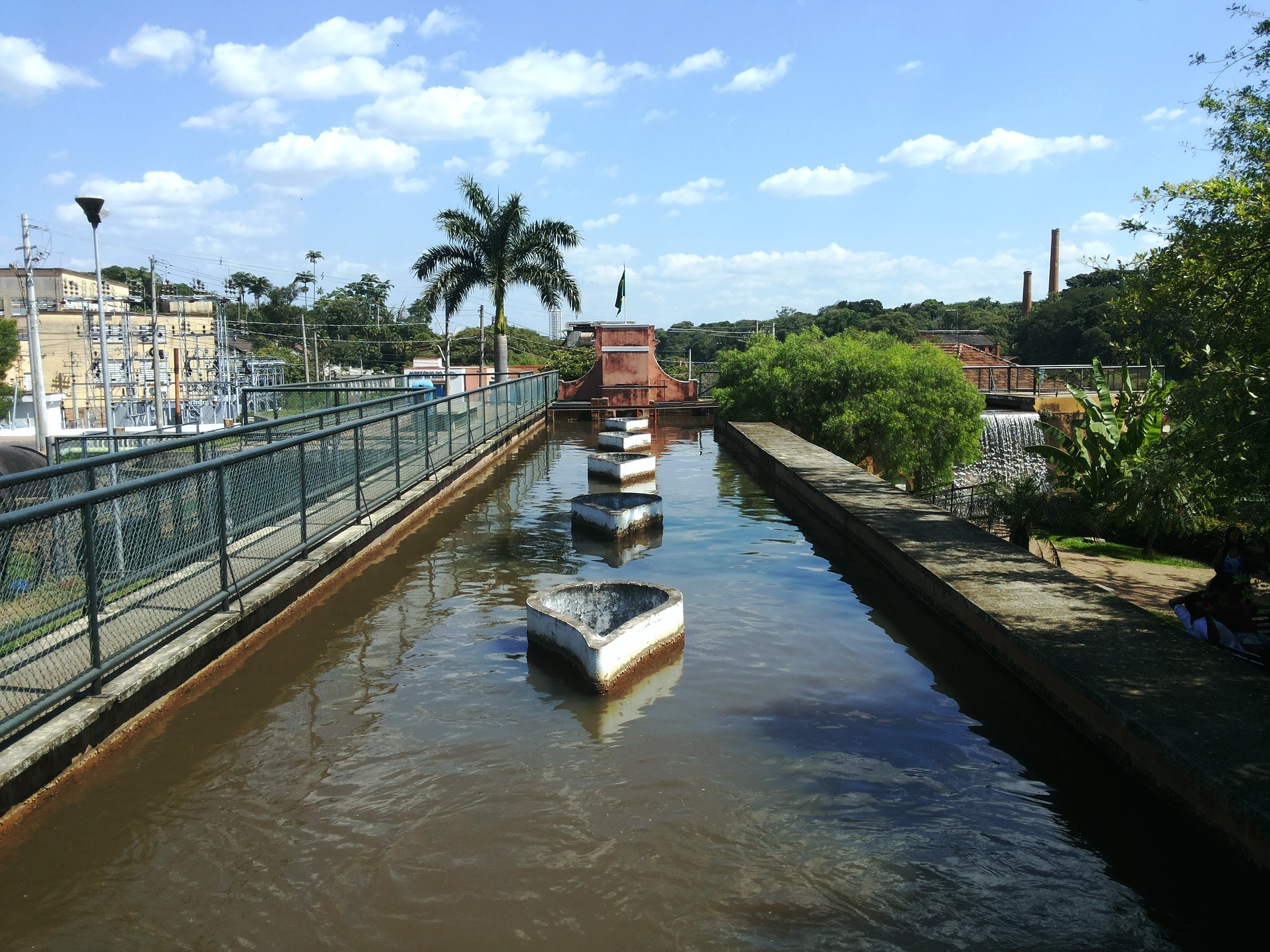
Piracicaba Water Museum

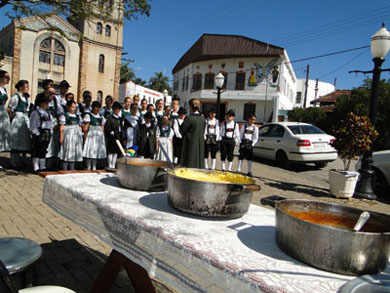
Santa Olímpia Polenta Festival

In addition to its scenic attractions, Piracicaba boasts a wealth of historical monuments, natural sites, and places to visit. Along the banks of the Piracicaba River, notable landmarks include: the Settler's House, a wattle-and-daub mansion built in the early 19th century, symbolizing the passage of bandeirantes through the region; the Mirante Park, established in 1895, offering a privileged view of the river’s rapids; the Workers' Leisure Center, spanning 60,000 m² with green spaces suitable for sports and adjacent to the Porto Street Park, which covers 20,000 m² and features a lake, exercise trails, playgrounds, and an arena theater. Within the Luiz de Queiroz College of Agriculture (ESALQ), several attractions can be found, including the ESALQ Library, the Professor Phillipe Westin Cabral de Vasconcelos Park, the ESALQ reflecting pools, a commemorative plaque in front of the main building, and the stained glass windows of the noble hall. Other places of interest include José Bonifácio Square, established in 1888 with trees planted by prominent citizens of the time; the Municipal Market, constructed in 1882 and inaugurated on 5 July 1888; the Mirante, built in the late 19th century by the Baron of Rezende along the Piracicaba River (its kiosk was constructed between 1906 and 1907), which was visited by Isabel in 1888; the Piracicaba School, inaugurated in 1881 as a school founded by American missionary Martha Watts; the Paulista Station, built in 1902, now serving as a vast leisure space; and one of the city’s greatest artistic and religious treasures, the Passage of the Lord of the Garden, created in 1883 by artist Miguelzinho Dutra.

The Secretariat of Cultural Action of the Piracicaba City Hall (SEMAC) oversees the city’s public cultural spaces, including its museums. The Piracicaba Water Museum chronicles the history of the city’s water collection and pumping system, displaying hydraulic pumps, antique water meters, and panels with photographs of services provided since the first Water Collection and Pumping Station. The Prudente de Moraes Historical and Educational Museum showcases the home of Prudente de Morais, Brazil’s third president, built in 1870, and documents the history of the Constitutionalist Revolution of 1932. The Luiz de Queiroz Museum and Center for Science, Education, and Arts, part of ESALQ, is housed in the former residence of the school’s deans and directors. The Central Mill of Piracicaba, built in 1881 by Estêvão Ribeiro de Sousa Resende, Baron of Rezende, aimed to replace slave labor with salaried work and mechanization, but was sold in 1899. Deactivated by the city hall in 1974 and recognized as a historical heritage site, it now serves as a significant cultural, artistic, and recreational space.

In rural tourism, the neighborhoods of Santa Olímpia and Santana form the Tyrolean Colony of Piracicaba, established over a century ago by immigrants from Tyrol (the Trento region, which belonged to Austria until 1919 and is now part of Italy). Other prominent green areas include the Tupi Forest Garden, a 200-hectare environmental conservation area offering trails for hiking; the Baths of Artemis, a place for the consumption of medicinal waters and bathing in sulphurous springs; and the Children's Paradise, established on 7 January 1976, where environmental campaigns aimed at children are held. This site is adjacent to the Piracicaba Municipal Zoo, founded on 18 August 1972, which currently spans approximately 36,000 m² and houses around 200 animals.

Piracicaba has three cemeteries: the Saudade Cemetery, built in 1849, the city’s most traditional necropolis, where prominent citizens are buried; the Vila Rezende Cemetery, founded in 1974, the city’s newest necropolis; and the rural cemetery Resurrection Park, a private necropolis established in 1971.

Piracicaba’s gastronomy is renowned throughout Brazil for its distinctive pamonhas.

== Sports ==
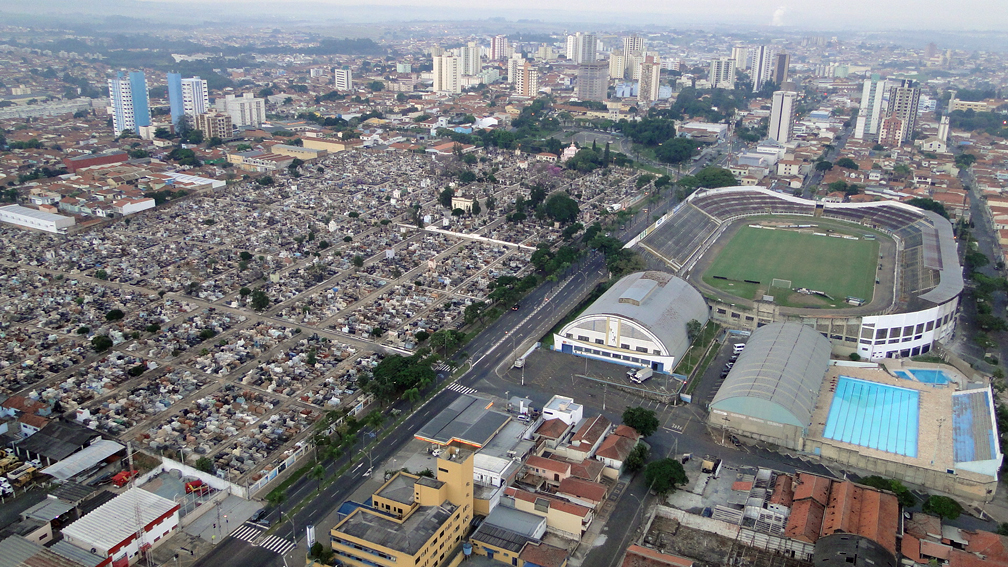
Estádio Barão da Serra Negra, home of XV de Piracicaba

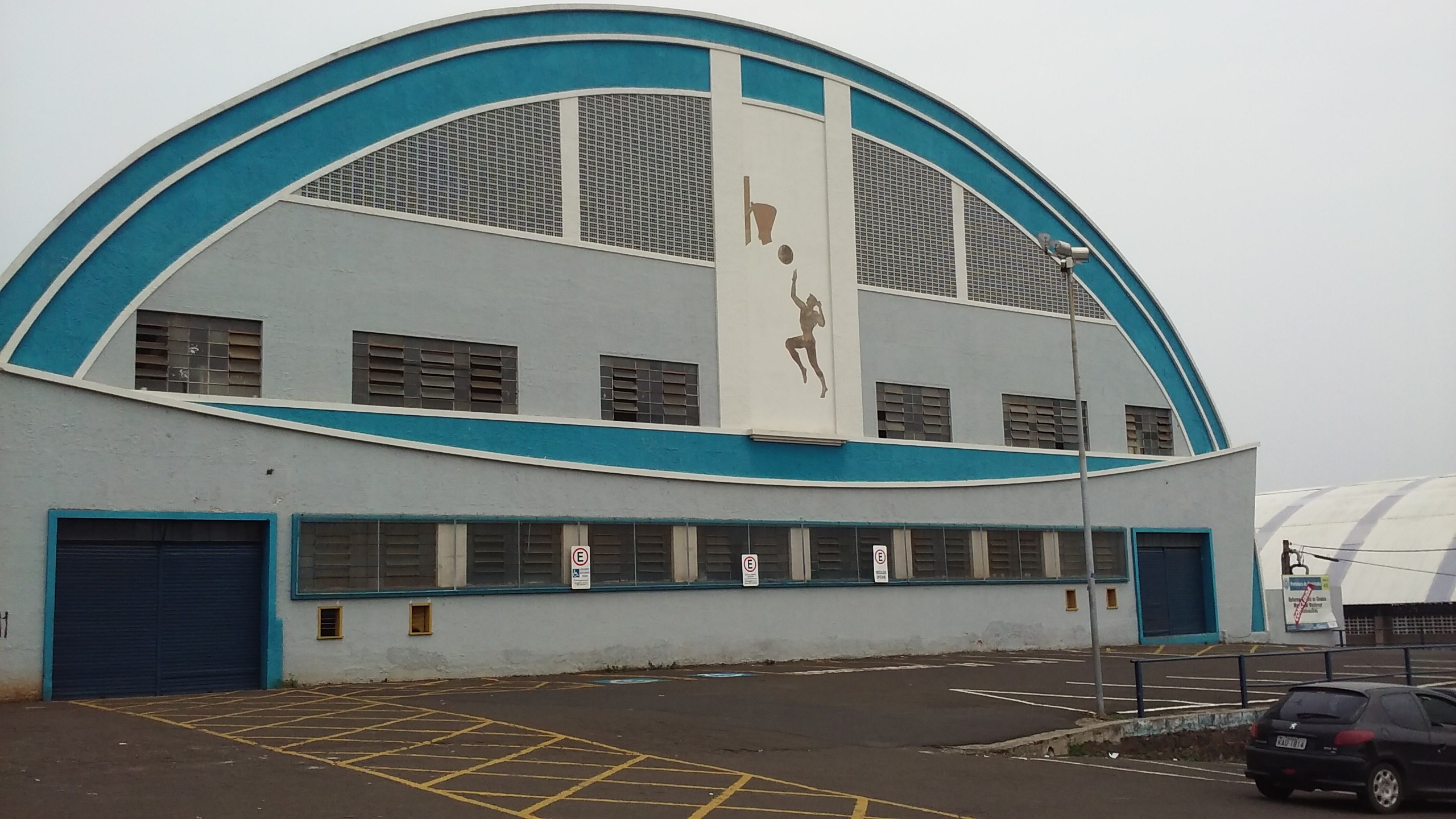
Waldemar Blatkauskas Municipal Gymnasium

The city is home to several sports clubs, including the Esporte Clube XV de Novembro, founded on 15 November 1913, which is the city’s main club. In the 1960s, under the leadership of Romeu Italo Ripoli, it competed in international matches in Europe and Asia.

Within Brazil, XV de Piracicaba has primarily competed in the divisions of the Campeonato Paulista and the Campeonato Brasileiro, winning the 1995 Campeonato Brasileiro Série C and, more recently, the 2011 Campeonato Paulista - Série A2. Their greatest success in top level competitions was the second place finish in the first division of the Campeonato Paulista in 1976, also under Ripoli’s leadership.

Other clubs that have achieved at least regional or state-level recognition include the Clube Atlético Piracicabano and MAF Futebol Clube. The main football stadiums are the Estádio Doutor Kok, with a capacity of 1,500 people, and the Estádio Barão da Serra Negra, which can hold over 25,000 spectators.

Beyond football, Piracicaba offers numerous facilities for other sports. The city is home to the only racetrack recognized by the Brazilian Automobile Confederation and the São Paulo Automobile Federation in the interior of São Paulo, as well as the Professor José Carlos Callado Hebling Sports Complex, which includes a multi-sport gymnasium, official beach volleyball courts with fencing, official malha courts (a traditional game similar to quoits), and a grandstand with a capacity for over 700 people. In 2010, the city had approximately 10 sports centers registered with the Department of Sports, Leisure, and Physical Activities (SELAM).

== Media ==
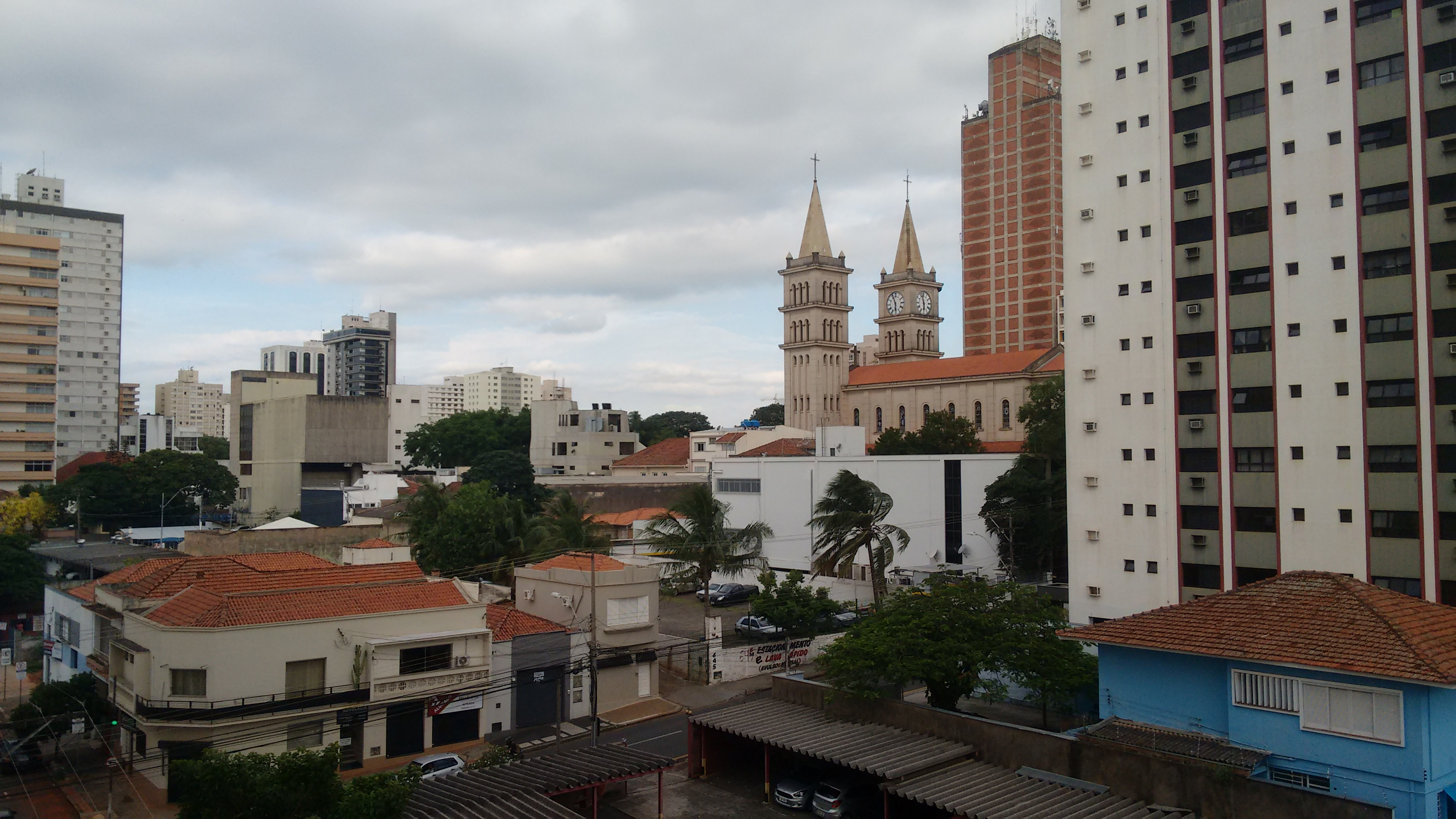
Partial view of downtown Piracicaba

The city has three main newspapers: the Jornal de Piracicaba, founded in 1900, one of the few newspapers in São Paulo state over 100 years old; the Gazeta de Piracicaba, which began in 1882, ceased in 1935, and resumed circulation in 2003; and A Tribuna Piracicabana, established in 1974. In addition to these, Piracicaba has several neighborhood newspapers with limited circulation, focusing exclusively on local content.

The city is also home to locally produced magazines, such as Trifatto, and Arraso.

== Holidays ==
Piracicaba observes four municipal holidays, eight national holidays, and six optional holidays. The municipal holidays are the feast of Saint Anthony, the city’s patron saint, on 13 June; Black Awareness Day, on 20 November; and the feast of Our Lady of Conception, on 8 December. According to federal law nº 9.093, enacted on 12 September 1995, municipalities may have up to four religious municipal holidays, including Good Friday.

== Notable people ==
- José Altafini, also known as "Mazola", a professional footballer.
- Jonathan Cafú, footballer
- Gabriel Boschilia, footballer
- Lucas Beraldo, footballer
- Erik Cardoso, sprinter
- Cassiano Leal, swimmer
- Evaristo Conrado Engelberg, engineer and inventor
- André Cypriano, professional photographer and documentarist
- Ronaldo Guiaro, footballer
- Marcos Pizzelli - footballer who played for the Armenian national team.
- Rubens Ometto Silveira Mello, the owner of Cosan.
- Guilherme Giovannoni, former basketball player
- Coutinho, former footballer
- Cristiano Zanin, minister and judge of brazilian supreme federal court

== Sister cities ==
- Seongnam, Gyeonggi Province, South Korea
- Santa Ana, El Salvador

== See also ==
- Renascer Community
- List of municipalities in São Paulo
