= Protestantism in Brazil =

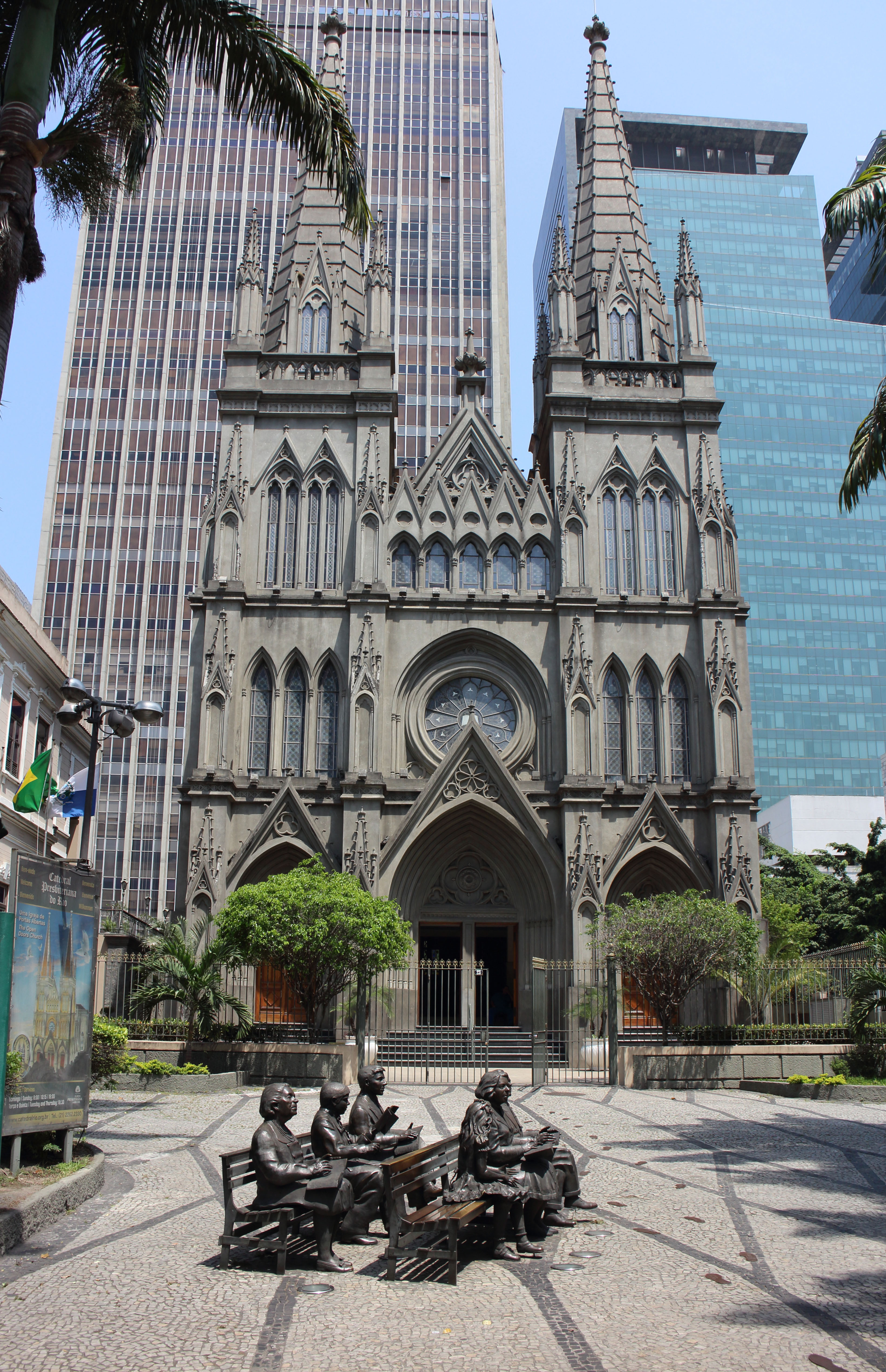
Presbyterian Cathedral in Rio de Janeiro.

In Brazil, Protestantism started spreading in the 19th century and grew in the 20th century. The 2022 census reported that 26.8% of the Brazilian population was Protestant, over 47 million individuals, making it the second largest Protestant population in the Western world. Another 2020 study from the Association of Religion Data Archives estimated that Brazil's Protestant population was 15.12%.

Brazilian Protestantism is primarily represented by Evangelical and Pentecostal churches, and a smaller proportion of Baptists. The remainder is made up of Lutherans, Adventists, Presbyterians and other mainline Protestant traditions.

== History ==
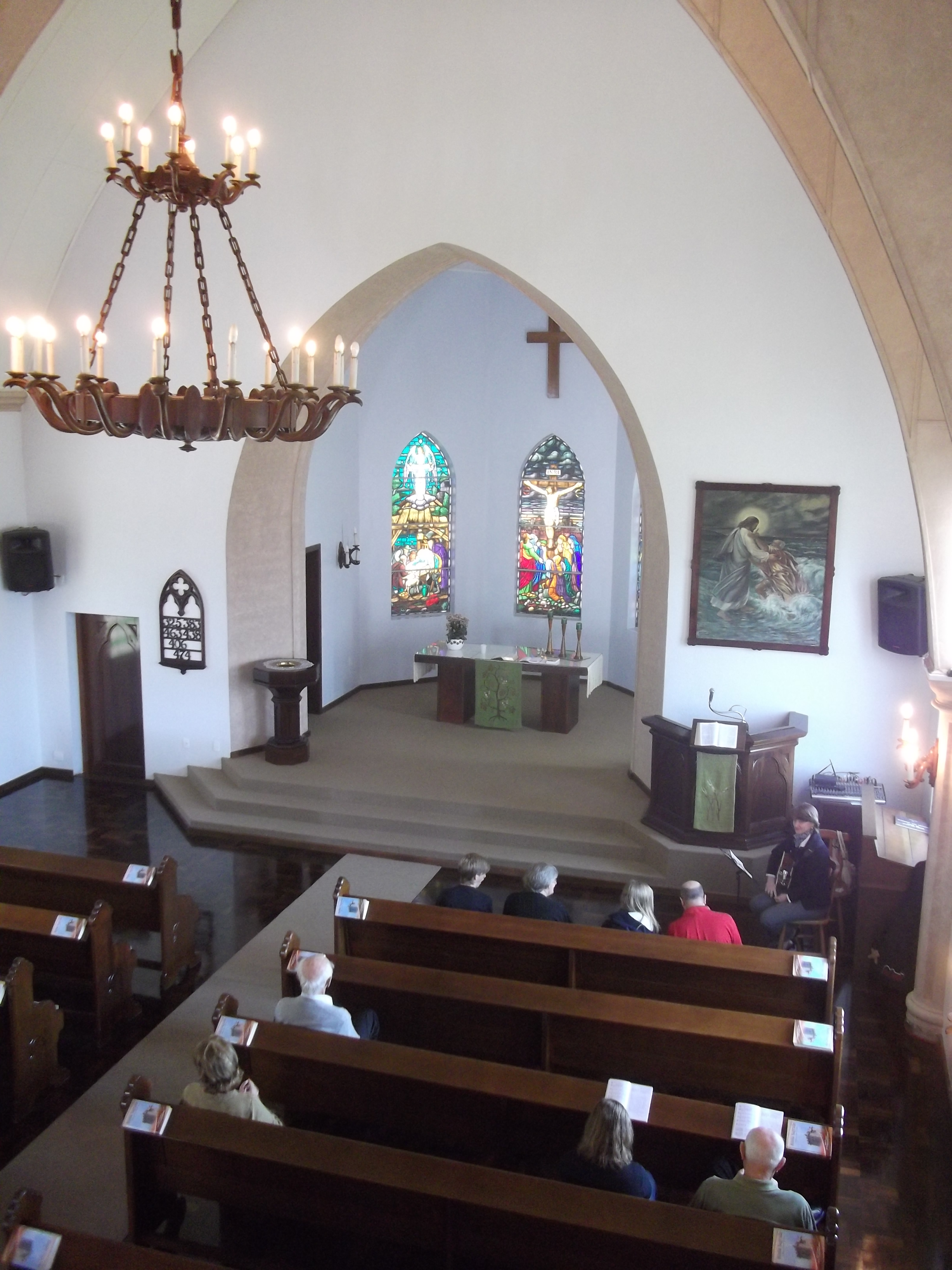
Protestant Church in Gramado.

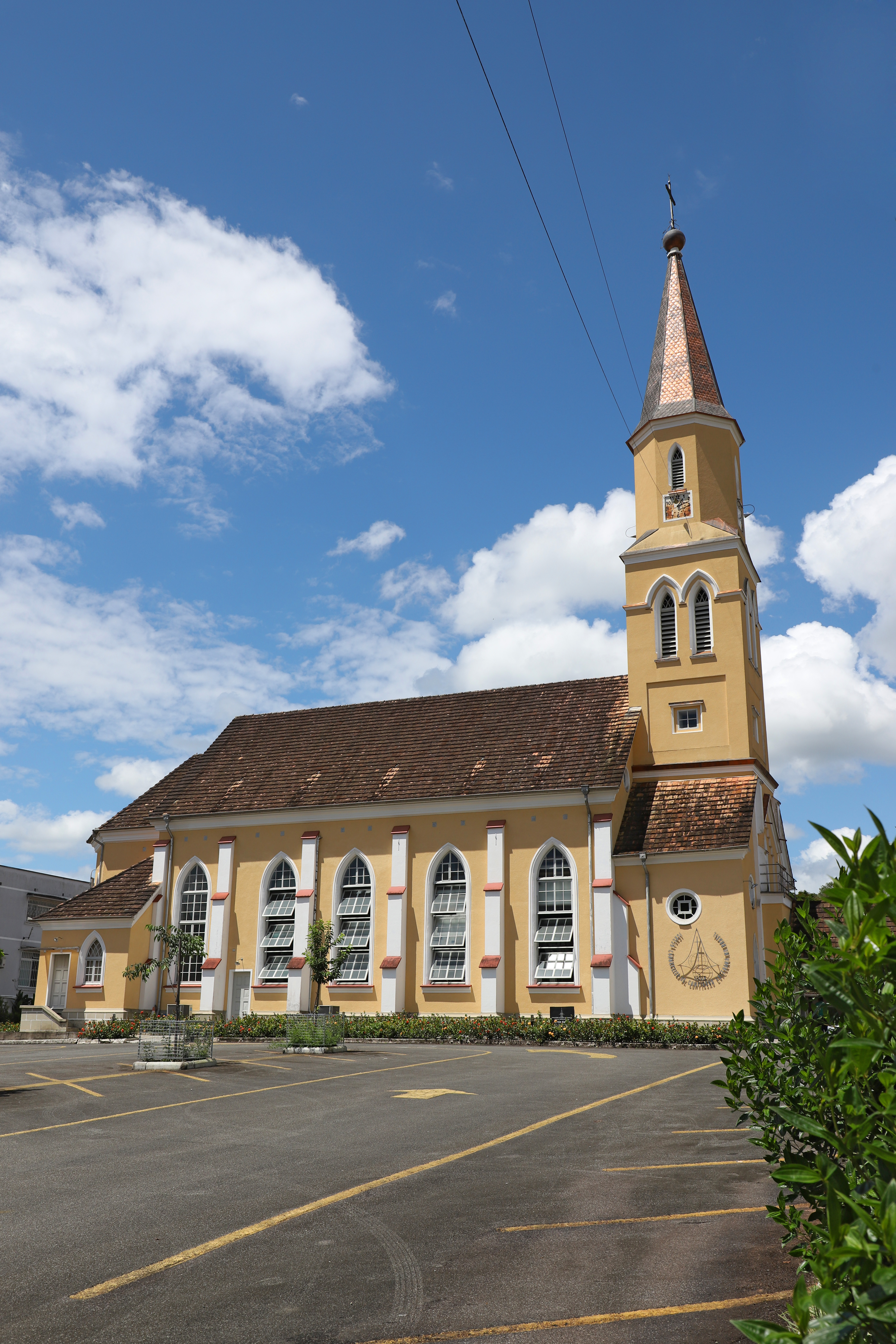
Protestant Church in Pomerode.

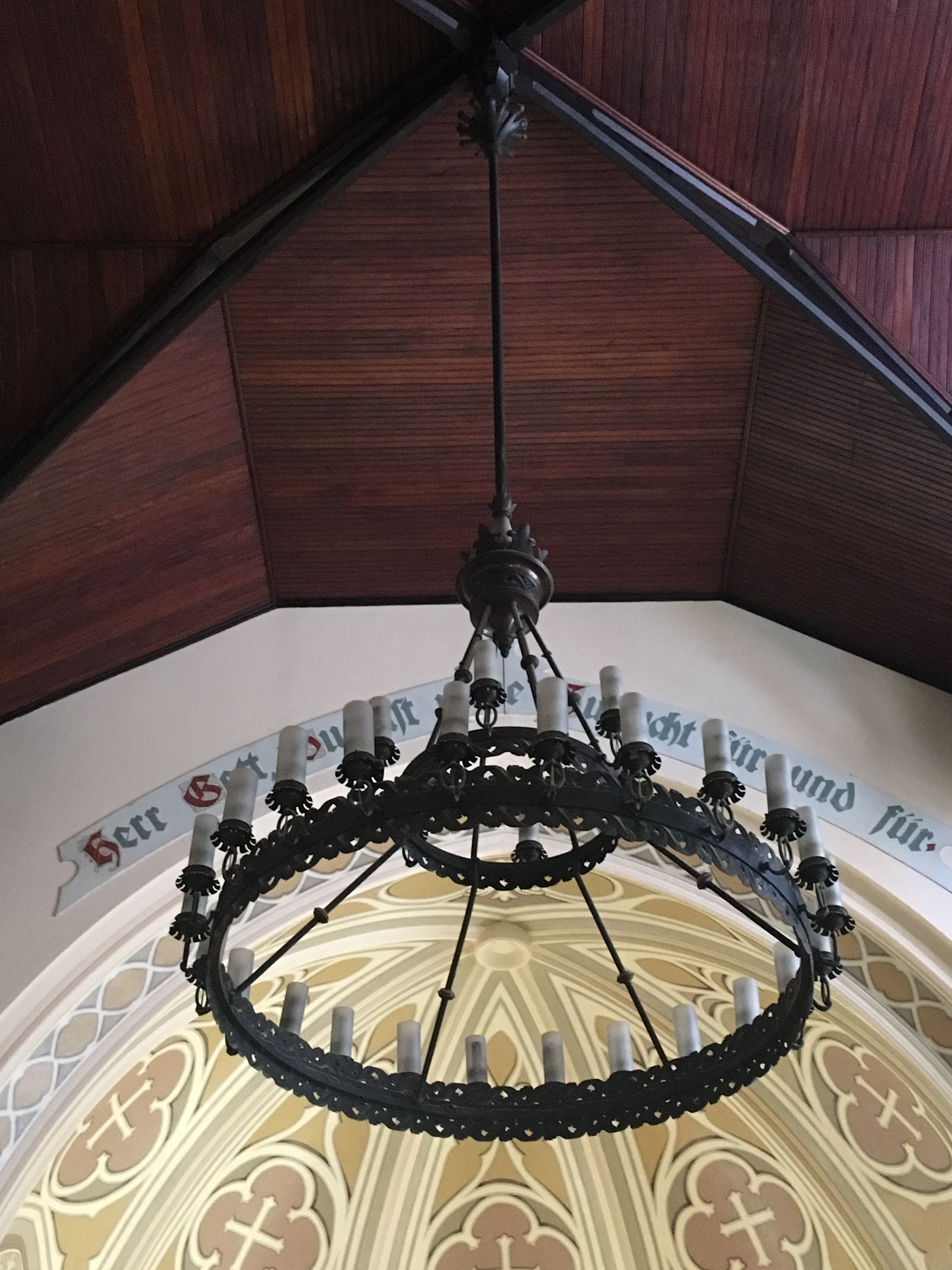
Protestant Church in São Paulo.

=== Origins ===
==== French Huguenot colony ====
Protestantism was first practiced in Brazil by Huguenot travelers attempting to colonize the country while it was under the Portuguese colonial rule. These attempts, however, would not persist.

A French mission sent by John Calvin was established in 1557 on one of the islands of Guanabara Bay, where the France Antarctique colony was founded. On March 10 of the same year, these Calvinists held the first Protestant service in Brazil and, according to some accounts, the first in all the New World.

==== Dutch Brazil ====
In the 17th century, the Dutch capitalized on the helplessness of Portugal's senior personal union partner, Spain. They took over a part of Brazil and established their Dutch culture, which included adherence to the Dutch Reformed Church and its orthodox, Gomarist version of Calvinism.

==== 18th century and later ====
Varieties of Protestantism were often introduced by immigrants from Europe but over the last three decades, the number of Neo-Pentecostal churches such as the Universal Church of the Kingdom of God has grown significantly.

=== 1820s to 1945 ===
In the 19th century, while the vast majority of Brazilians were nominal Catholics, the nation was underserved by priests, and for large numbers of people religion did not play an important role in daily life. Protestantism in Brazil largely originated with European immigrants as well as British American missionaries following up on efforts that began in the 1820s.

The first Anglican chapel began to offer services to English-speaking people in Rio de Janeiro in 1822. In the same city, the Prussian consul sponsored the founding of a German and French Reformed congregation in 1827, which today is a Lutheran church.

Among missionaries, Methodists were most active, along with Presbyterians and Baptists. The Seventh-day Adventists began in 1894, and the YMCA was organized in 1896. The missionaries promoted schools, colleges and seminaries, including the liberal arts Mackenzie Presbyterian University in São Paulo, and an agricultural school. The Presbyterian schools in particular later became the nucleus of the governmental system. In 1887 Protestants in Rio de Janeiro formed a hospital.

The missionaries largely reached a working-class audience, as the Brazilian upper class was wedded either to Catholicism or to secularism. By 1914, Protestant churches founded by U.S. missionaries had 47,000 communicants, served by 282 missionaries. In general, these missionaries were more successful than they had been in Mexico, Argentina or elsewhere in Latin America.

The first Seventh Day Baptists soon appeared in Brazil. They expanded in territory and Brazil became home to one of the world's highest Seventh Day Baptist populations.

The Catholic Church was disestablished in 1890, and responded by increasing the number of dioceses and the efficiency of its clergy. Many Protestants came from a large German immigrant community and they were mostly Lutheran, but they were seldom engaged in proselytizing and grew by natural increase. Most Protestants came from missionary activities sponsored by the United States and Europe. By 1930, there were 700,000 Protestants, about 2% of the population, and they were increasingly in charge of their own affairs.

In 1930, the Methodist Church of Brazil became independent of the missionary societies and elected its own bishop. Protestants were largely working-class, but their networks helped accelerate their upward social mobility.

=== Since 1945 ===
Protestantism, which has resisted syncretism more than other Christian churches have in the diverse country, established a significant presence in Brazil during the first half of the 20th century and grew during the second half. Protestants accounted for fewer than 5% of the population until the 1960s, but by 2000 made up over 15% of those affiliated with a church. Pentecostals and Charismatic groups account for most of this expansion. This expansion has historically been attributed to the efforts of American missionaries, entrepreneurs and politicians (including the Central Intelligence Agency) with expanding evangelical theology in South America as a counter to communism, socialism, and other movements including Latin American Catholicism's growing liberation theology.

After centuries of persecution under Portuguese colonial rule, which was successful in consolidating Catholicism in the country, Protestant denominations have seen a rapid growth in their number of followers since the last decades of the 20th century.

Until the late 1970s, the majority of Brazilian Protestants were Lutherans, Presbyterians, or Baptists; however, the Pentecostals, especially from neo-charismatic churches linked to the prosperity doctrine, have grown significantly in number since then.

Through the 20th century efforts of the Seventh-day Adventists, Brazilians developed a Seventh-day Adventist educational system with over 475 elementary schools, 67 secondary schools, two colleges and a university. The rich and the poor remained traditional Catholics, while most Evangelical Protestants were in the new lower-middle class, known as the "C class" (in a A–E classification system). A 2015 survey in Brazil found that the majority of prisoners may be Evangelicals.

At the time of the 2000 census, due to evangelism and missionary work, 15.4% of the Brazilian population began to identify as Protestant. Research conducted by the Datafolha institute showed that an estimated 31% of Brazilians were Protestants as of 2020. The 2010 census found that 22.2% were Protestant, while a 2020 survey from ARDA estimated a 15.12% Protestant population, down from Datafolha's studies.

With the growth of Evangelicalism and Pentecostal churches across Brazil, however, as of 2023, there has been an increase in religious intolerance toward non-Protestants; Afro-Brazilian religious leaders and institutions have been targeted and destroyed, sparking numerous interfaith protests. An Afro-Brazilian priestess was also murdered. As of 2024, Evangelicals were labeled as the most intolerant of religious groups in Brazil. From 2024–2025, a lawsuit was re-opened after a Brazilian Catholic and Brazilian atheist police officer among others were allegedly forced to attend Evangelical gatherings.

== Politics ==
Evangelical Protestantism has, since its introduction to Latin America by American missionaries, been deeply involved in Brazilian and international politics; their influence has even been implicated in the attempted 2022 Brazilian coup, where 70% of evangelical Protestants voted for President Jair Bolsonaro in 2018 Brazilian general election. In the Brazilian National Congress, there is the Evangelical Caucus, a loosely organized group of Protestant, Evangelical, and Pentecostal lawmakers in the Brazilian government and legislature. If considered a political party, the Evangelical Caucus would be the third largest in the Brazilian government, surpassed only by the Brazilian Democratic Movement and the Workers' Party.

As of 2025, many Evangelicals, like some Catholics, have begun reconsidering religion as important political factors, although some have continued promoting evangelical political campaigns.

== Demography ==
Protestants in Brazil by branch (2010 census)
1. Pentecostal (60.0%)
2. Baptist (8.81%)
3. Adventist (3.69%)
4. Lutheran (2.36%)
5. Presbyterian (2.18%)
6. Methodist (0.81%)
7. Congregational (0.26%)
8. Other (0.07%)
9. Undetermined (21.8%)
Protestants in Brazil by denomination according to Datafolha (2016)
1. Assemblies of God (34.0%)
2. Baptist Church (11.0%)
3. Universal Church of the Kingdom of God (8.00%)
4. Christian Congregation in Brazil (6.00%)
5. Foursquare Church (5.00%)
6. God is Love Pentecostal Church (3.00%)
7. Adventist Church (3.00%)
8. Presbyterian Church (2.00%)
9. International Grace of God Church (2.00%)
10. Worldwide Church of God's Power (2.00%)
11. Other (24.0%)

According to 2010 IBGE census, the following were the biggest Protestant denominations in Brazil. Only those with more than half a million members are listed.

- Pentecostals: 25,370,484

Assemblies of God (Assembléias de Deus): 12,314,410 (6.5%) (Classic Swedish-Brazilian Pentecostal denomination.)
General Convention of the Assemblies of God (affiliated with the US Assemblies of God, Springfield, MO): 3.6 million.
National Convention of the Assemblies of God (also known as the Madureira Ministry of the Assemblies of God): 2.5 million.
Other independent Assemblies of God: 1.9 million
Christian Congregation in Brazil (Italian-Brazilian Pentecostals): 2,289,634 (1.3%)
O Brasil para Cristo(Brazil for Christ): 2,196,665
Foursquare Gospel Church Igreja do Evangelho Quadrangular (Classic Pentecostals in US, but second-wave Pentecostals in Brazil): 1,808,389 (0.8%)

- Baptists: 3,723,691 (1.9%)

Brazilian Baptist Convention (stemming from the US Southern Baptists and BWA body member): 1.4 million adherents
National Baptist Convention (Charismatics Baptists and BWA body member): 1 million.
Independent Baptist Convention (Scandinavian Baptists): 400,000.
Brazilian Seventh Day Baptist Conference: 4,953
Other Baptists: 300,000

- Adventists: 1.8 million (1.0%)

Seventh-day Adventist Church: 1.6 million
Promise Adventist Church (Brazilian Pentecostal Adventists): 150,000
Seventh Day Adventist Reform Movement: 50,000
Other Adventists: 100,000

- Lutherans: 1 million (0.6%)

Evangelical Church of the Lutheran Confession in Brazil: 634,286
Evangelical Lutheran Church of Brazil: 243,093
Other Lutherans

- Reformed churches: 2.5 million

Presbyterian Church of Brazil: 1,011,300
Independent Presbyterian Church of Brazil: 85,000
Renewed Presbyterian Church in Brazil: 131,000
Conservative Presbyterian Church in Brazil: 6,000
Fundamentalist Presbyterian Church in Brazil: 1,800
United Presbyterian Church of Brazil: 3,466
Evangelical Reformed Church in Brazil: 2,500
Reformed Churches in Brazil
Hungarian Reformed Church
Protestant Church of Brazil
Swiss Evangelical Church
Arab Evangelical Church
Evangelical Congregational Church in Brazil: 50,000
United Congregational Churches in Brazil: 50,000
Reformed Anglican Church in Brazil
Comunhão Reformada Battista no Brasil – reformed baptists in Brazil

- Methodists: 340,963 (0.201%)

Methodist Church of Brazil (affiliated to US United Methodist Church): 200,000
Wesleyan Methodist Church (Brazilian Pentecostal Methodists): 100,000
Other Methodists: 40,000

== See also ==
- Religion in Brazil
- Evangelicalism in Brazil
- Methodist Church in Brazil
