= Presbyterian Church of Grace (Brazil) =

Grace Presbyterian Church
- Classification: Protestant
- Orientation: Pentecostal
- Theology: Evangelical
- Region: Brazil and Nepal
- Origin: 1995
- Separated from: Presbyterian Church of Brazil
- Congregations: 21
- Official website: www.presbiterianadagraca.com.br

The Presbyterian Church of Grace (in Portuguese Igreja Presbiteriana da Graça ) is a Pentecostal denomination, founded on October 8, 1995, in Mogi das Cruzes , São Paulo by a group of dissident members of the Presbyterian Church of Brazil, who adhered to the Pentecostal doctrine of Baptism with the Holy Spirit as the second blessing, after conversion. Despite having Presbyterian in its name, the denomination has not kept Presbyterian doctrines nor its form of government. Episcopalism has been judged as the most appropriate form of government for the denomination. The church has adopted the so-called Vision of the Five Ministries which includes among other elements the ordination of contemporary apostles. This doctrine is completely rejected by traditional Presbyterian denominations and generally adopted by neopentecostal denominations The Presbyterian Church of Grace has congregations spread throughout Brazil and also in Nepal.

== History ==
The denomination emerged on October 8, 1995, in Mogi das Cruzes, São Paulo from a group of members of Igreja Presbiteriana do Brasil who claimed to have been baptized by the Holy Spirit, seeking to establish a Pentecostal church. Several churches were planted in other locations in Mogi das Cruzes and later in neighboring cities.

With the expansion of the denomination, it already had about 14 churches in 2016.

The current headquarters of the denomination is located in Mogi das Cruzes, Rua .Francisco Martins Feitosa, 535 - Vila Lavínia

== Doctrine ==
The IPG is a Pentecostal denomination. It affirms the doctrine of Trinity, Continuity, and the Five Ministries Vision. In this view, the church affirms that it is necessary for the church to have contemporary apostles (and therefore the church is included in the Apostolic Restoration Movement), in addition to teachers, pastors, prophets and evangelists. This makes the denomination completely different from traditional Presbyterian denominations.

The church uses a boat as its symbol and the slogan Ministry of Peace. The church does not own and does not subscribe to any of the historical confessions of faith of Presbyterianism such as the Westminster Confession of Faith which is the official confession of faith of the Presbyterian Church of Brazil, Igreja Presbiteriana Independente do Brasil, Conservative Presbyterian Church in Brazil, Fundamentalist Presbyterian Church in Brazil and United Presbyterian Church of Brazil and is one of the hallmarks of Presbyterianism worldwide.
