= Presbyterian Christian Church (1968-1975) =

Presbyterian denomination in Brazil

- Classification: Protestant
- Orientation: Pentecostal
- Polity: Presbyterian
- Region: Brazil
- Origin: 1968
- Separated from: Presbyterian Church of Brazil
- Merger of: Renewed Independent Presbyterian Church to form the current Renewed Presbyterian Church of Brazil

The Presbyterian Christian Church (in Portuguese Igreja Cristã Presbiteriana - ICP) was a presbyterian denomination that emerged in 1968 in Cianorte, Paraná, dissident from the Presbyterian Church of Brazil. The reason for its separation was the adherence to Pentecostalism by members of the Presbyterian Church of Brazil (IPB). As the denomination of origin did not accept the doctrinal change, several churches separated and formed the ICP in 1968. The denomination initially brought together four presbyteries: Cianorte, Brasil Central, São Paulo and Vitória.

In 1975 the denomination joined the Renewed Independent Presbyterian Church , a dissident from the Independent Presbyterian Church of Brazil, to form the current Renewed Presbyterian Church of Brazil, which, in 2016, was made up of 154,048 members, in 1,140 churches and congregations.
