= Renewed Independent Presbyterian Church =

Renovated Independent Presbyterian Church
- Classification: Protestant
- Orientation: Pentecostal
- Polity: Presbyterian
- Region: Brazil
- Origin: 1972
- Separated from: Independent Presbyterian Church of Brazil
- Merger of: Presbyterian Christian Church (1968-1975) to form the current Renewed Presbyterian Church of Brazil

The Renewed Independent Presbyterian Church (in portuguese Igreja Presbiteriana Independente Renovada - IPIR) was a presbyterian denomination that emerged in 1972 in Assis, São Paulo, dissident from the Independent Presbyterian Church of Brazil (IPIB). The reason for its separation was the adherence to Pentecostalism by members of the IPIB. As the denomination of origin did not accept the doctrinal change, the Pentecostal followers left and formed the IPIR in 1972.

In 1975 the denomination joined with the Presbyterian Christian Church, a dissident Presbyterian Church of Brazil to form the current Renewed Presbyterian Church of Brazil, which had, in 2015, approximately 152,619 members throughout Brazil.
