= Reformed Presbyterian Church of Brazil =

Presbyterian Reformed Church of Brazil
- Classification: Protestant
- Orientation: Reformed
- Polity: Presbyterian
- Region: Brazil
- Founder: Rev. Joacir Emerick Eler
- Origin: October, 31, 2000; Caratinga, Minas Gerais, Brazil
- Separated from: Presbyterian Church of Brazil
- Congregations: 7 (2018)

The Reformed Presbyterian Church of Brazil (Portuguese: Igreja Presbiteriana Reformada do Brasil) is a Presbyterian denomination founded on October 31, 2000, by Rev. Joacir Emerick Eler and former members of the Igreja Presbiteriana do Brasil, in Caratinga, Minas Gerais.

From the work of planting churches, the denomination spread to several cities in the state.

In Caratinga, the church is known for its social work, such as preventing drug use among young people.

In addition to Caratinga, other cities in which the denomination has churches or congregations are: Santa Bárbara, Santa Rita de Minas and Santa Margarida.
