= Simonton =

Simonton may refer to:

== Places in the United States ==
- Simonton, Texas, city in Fort Bend County, Texas
- Simonton Lake, Indiana, census-designated place in Elkhart County, Indiana

== People ==
- Ann Simonton, American writer, lecturer, and feminist media activist
- Ashbel Green Simonton (1833–1867), American Presbyterian minister and missionary
- Charles Bryson Simonton (1838–1911), member of the United States House of Representatives
- Charles Henry Simonton (1829–1904), United States federal judge
- John Simonton (1943–2005), circuit designer
- Ken Simonton (born 1979), American football running back
- O. Carl Simonton (1942–2009), American psycho-oncologist
- Richard Simonton (1915–1979), also known as Doug Malloy, Hollywood businessman and entrepreneur
- William Simonton (1788–1846), Whig member of the U.S. House of Representatives from Pennsylvania
