= Renewed Presbyterian Church of Brazil =

- Classification: Protestant
- Orientation: Pentecostal
- Theology: IPRB Confession of Faith
- Polity: Presbyterian
- Region: Brazil
- Founder: Abel Amaral
- Origin: 1975; Maringá
- Separated from: Presbyterian Church of Brazil, and Independent Presbyterian Church of Brazil
- Merger of: Presbyterian Christian Church (1968-1975) and Renewed Independent Presbyterian Church
- Separations: 1990: Presbyterian Christian Church (1990)
- Congregations: 1,300 (2024 estimate)
- Members: 174,419 (2024 estimate)
- Official website: www.iprb.org.br

The Renewed Presbyterian Church of Brazil (in Portuguese Igreja Presbiteriana Renovada do Brasil - IPRB) is a Protestant Brazilian denomination founded in 1975 by the merger of two predecessor churches, the Presbyterian Christian Church (a dissident of the Presbyterian Church of Brazil) and the Renewed Independent Presbyterian Church (a separate church from the Independent Presbyterian Church of Brazil). The motivation for the emergence of both previous denominations was the influence of the Pentecostal movement. In 2024, the denomination had 1,300 churches and congregations throughout Brazil, with approximately 174,419 members.

== History ==
Following the movement for revival that occurred in the Brazilian Presbyterian environment in the 1960s, two churches were born with similar doctrines, practices, objectives and characteristics: the Presbyterian Christian Church (1968-1975), ICP, in 1968, (dissident from the Presbyterian Church of Brazil) and the Renewed Independent Presbyterian Church, IPIR, in 1972 (dissident from the Independent Presbyterian Church of Brazil). Most of the members were in the states of São Paulo and Paraná.

The affinity led these churches to a rapprochement, which resulted in the union of the two denominations, on January 8, 1975, sealed in a memorable constitutive assembly, held in Maringá, PR, thus giving birth to the Renewed Presbyterian Church of Brazil (IPRB). The first assembly elected pastor Palmiro Andrade as its first president.

The IPRB adopted the Aleluia Newspaper, founded in 1972, as its official organ. The Cianorte Bible Institute was elevated to the category of seminary.

Its headquarters are located in Maringá, PR, where its president resides.

== Statistics ==
Year	Members
1975	8,335
2000	80,025
2006	100,832
2007	107,335
2008	116,742
2009	120,807
2010	127,968
2011	131,972
2012	139,009
2013	142,043
2014	144,432
2015	152,619
2016	154,048
2024	174,419

The IPRB was born with 8,335 members, 12,497 students in Sunday schools, 84 churches, 94 congregations, 7 mission fields, 59 pastors, 89 evangelists, 257 elders, 278 deacons, 97 temples and worship halls, 26 pastoral houses, 34 plots of land, 776 subscribers to the Aleluia Newspaper and 60 students at the Renovated Presbyterian Seminary of Cianorte.

According to 2011 statistics, the church had 132,000 members and 474 congregations and 50 presbyteries. By the end of 2012, the denomination had 139,009 members in 778 congregations and 694 preaching points and more than 803 pastors. The number of presbyteries is 53.

In 2016, the church reported 154,048 members in 53 presbyteries.

In 2024, in a tribute held at the Chamber of Deputies of Brazil, it was reported that the denomination had over 160,000 members.

In 2025, in a tribute held at the Chamber of Councillors of Osasco, it was reported that the denomination has just under 170,000 members, over 1,300 churches and 1,500 pastors, in 39 countries.

In 2024, the church released new detailed statistics, reporting: 174,419 members, of which 1,578 were pastors. In this year, the denomination had 61 presbyteries and 1,300 churches. In addition to Brazil, it had churches in 39 other countries, with 180 missionaries.

== Doctrine ==
The denomination has its own confession of faith. However, there are doctrinal differences among the denomination's pastors regarding its content, so much so that some claim that there was no extensive debate over the text. The confession adheres to some elements of the Westminster Confession of Faith (WCF). However, it is strongly influenced by classical Arminian doctrine.

The following are the main differences between the IPRB confession of faith and the Westminster Confession of Faith (WCF), adopted by other Presbyterian denominations (IPB, IPIB, IPFB and IPU):

Confession	Renewed Presbyterian Church of Brazil	Westminster Confession of Faith
Human will	Affirms human free will (chapter 9)	Denies that man has free will after the fall (chapter 9)
Origin of saving faith	Affirms saving faith as a human work, potentially produced by God (chapter 11)	Affirms that saving faith is the work of the Spirit of Christ (chapter 14)
Baptism	By immersion and credobaptist, that is, only for adults (chapter 15)	Establishes baptism by sprinkling or effusion and administered to the children of believers, in the pedobaptist form (chapter 28)
Lord's Supper	The Lord's Supper as a memorial of Christ's death, according to the vision of Huldrych Zwingli (chapter 16)	Spiritual presence of Christ in the Supper, communicated to the elect by the Holy Spirit, according to the vision of John Calvin
Baptism with the Holy Spirit	Second blessing, after conversion, that enables believers to fulfill the mission of the Church, according to the Pentecostal position (chapter 19)	Not addressed in the confession, but seen by Reformed churches as conversion itself
Gifts	Believes in the continuity of all charismatic gifts (chapter 20)	It is not addressed in the confession, but most Reformed churches adhere to Cessationism regarding charismatic sounds, claiming that they were necessary only at the founding of the church
Eschatology	premillennial eschatology dispensationalist (chapters 22 and 24)	Not clearly addressed in the confession, but the majority view in the Reformed churches is Amillennialism

== Government ==
The IPRB adopts a mixed government system. It contains elements of Presbyterianism in local churches (pastors and elders); It has presbyteries, formed by the pastors and a representative from each local church. However, it does not have synods. The General Assembly of the Denomination is formed by all the pastors and a representative from each local church.

The Church has its Executive Board, elected every three years by the General Assembly. The Administrative Board is formed by the Executive Board, the presidents of the presbyteries, and the presidents of the so-called "general institutions" (Board of Publications, Seminaries and MISPA, which is the Missions body). The Administrative Board may make important ecclesiastical decisions without representation from local churches.

== Theological Formations ==
The denomination operates two seminaries: Renovated Presbyterian Seminary in Anápolis, Goiás and Renewed Presbyterian in Cianorte, Paraná.
