= John Phillip Boehm =

- Born: November 24, 1683; Hochstadt, Landgraviate of Hesse-Kassel
- Died: April 25, 1749 (aged 65); Pennsylvania

Pennsylvania Historical Marker
- Official name: John Philip Boehm (1683-1749)
- Type: Roadside
- Criteria: Government & Politics 18th Century, Professions & Vocations, Religion
- Designated: June 23, 2018
- Location: Boehm United Church of Christ, 571 Penllyn-Blue Bell Pk., Blue Bell
- Marker Text: Founder of the German Reformed Church in Pa., subsequently known as the Reformed Church in the United States. From 1725 to 1740, he established twelve churches, requiring each to adopt a constitution which governed the voting rights of its members and created rules for discipline and money management. This was an early example of democratic governance. He founded his final church here in 1740 and is buried beneath it. The church was named in his honor.

John Phillip Boehm (1683–1749) was a school teacher and an early leader in the German Reformed Church, first as a lay reader and later as an ordained minister. He is considered the founder of the German Reformed Church. German Reformed congregations are now part of the Reformed Church in the United States and the United Church of Christ.

== Early life ==
John Philip Boehm was born on November 24, 1683, in Hochstadt, in the Landgraviate of Hesse-Kassel, in modern-day Germany. His parents were Maria and Philip Ludwig Böhm, who was as a schoolmaster who became a Reformed minister. During his childhood, his father was married a second time. Philip Ludwig's "slippery tongue" got him into trouble with his second wife and his church, which resulted in the family moving often.

== Schoolmaster ==
On April 14, 1706, he was received as a citizen at Lambsheim, where he became an innkeeper of the Stag Inn (Hirschwirt), which was owned by his parents-in-law, Anna Maria and Hartman Stähler. He moved to Worms (present-day Germany) in 1708, where he was the Reformed school teacher. He then secured a teaching position in Lambsheim, where he taught from 1715 to 1720.

In 1720, Boehm immigrated to Pennsylvania and settled near Philadelphia in Whitpain and was a schoolmaster.

== German Reformed Church minister ==
=== Founding ===
When he settled in Whitpain, he also became a Bible "reader" of Reformed congregations, due to the lack of ministers. In 1725, communities in Falkner Swamp, Skippack Township and Whitemarsh Township called him to be their pastor. Seeing the need for ministers, he accepted the position even though he was not an ordained minister. When he accepted or when he first administered sacraments, he founded what became the German Reformed Church of the United States. On October 15, 1725, Boehm served his first communion in Falkner Swamp, and between the three congregations, there were over 100 communicant members. Since he was not ordained, he would not perform baptisms. Some congregants went to Philadelphia's Presbyterian Church for baptisms.

Boehm drew up a constitution that became the governing document for the first Reformed churches. Adopted by the congregants, it provided for government by a consistory, and adoption of the Heidelberg Catechism and Palatinate Church Order provided more clarity about the beliefs of the German Reformed Church.

As more communities sought his services, he led congregations throughout what are now ten counties of Pennsylvania. He served at least 13 congregations in southeastern Pennsylvania between Philadelphia and the Blue Ridge Mountains and between the Susquehanna and Delaware Rivers. For eighteen years, he traveled 100 miles a month on horseback on dangerous trails, through swamps, and along steep precipices. He traveled through the wilderness where he could encounter hostile Native Americans. Boehm helped form and lead the congregations, preached services, conducted catechetical training, and administered sacraments and rites.

=== Controversy and ordination ===
In 1727, two years after Boehm began his ministry, an ordained German Reformed minister named George Weiss arrived in Pennsylvania. He came with a colony of Germans to Philadelphia, where he was a pastor for the first German Reformed church there. His arrival started a controversy, as Weiss argued that Boehm's ministry was in violation of Reformed polity, and was therefore invalid. Boehm was ordained by the Low Dutch congregation of the Amsterdam Classis on November 23, 1729, which placed the churches under the Reformed Church of Holland.

Boehm came to Pennsylvania anticipating religious freedom. William Penn offered that "all persons living in this province who confess and acknowledge the one Almighty and Eternal God… shall in no ways be molested or prejudiced for their religious persuasion." The government did not prescribe how Pennsylvanians should worship, but they did not protect people from prejudice by members of other denominations. In Germany, pastors reported harassment by sectarians and they were subject to fines or imprisonment. They might also be banished from the area or executed.

There was greater diversity among German faiths upon settling in Pennsylvania. George Thomas, deputy governor of the state, said that '"Germans had imported with them all the religious whimsies of their own country" and even sub-divided further in America.' Pastors, including Boehm, were heckled and harassed, and sectarians created dissension among congregants. A number of Reformed congregants left the church for other denominations. This reduced the funds received by the church, making it was difficult to pay the pastor or fund congregations. It also made it difficult to find ministers.

In 1730, the churches in the Philadelphia area were left under the sole care of Boehm after Weiss traveled to Europe to raise money for their cause in America. Weiss would return the following year, and eventually settled in Rhinebeck, New York. In 1741, Boehm and John Bartholomew Rieger were the only ordained German Reformed ministers in the state. Spread thin by the number of congregations he served, Boehm could not be a regular presence among the worshippers, which was also a factor in the migration of Reformed congregants to other churches, like the Moravian Church and the Congregation of God in the Spirit.

Boehm did not earn enough money as a minister to support himself and his family. He lived a simple life, though, and earned money working his farm. At some point, his son Anthony William farmed the land and made enough to support his father.

=== Later ministry ===
In 1742, Count Nicolaus von Zinzendorf, the bishop of the Moravian Church arrived in Pennsylvania, attempting to unite the German denominations into the Moravian Church. Boehm actively resisted and the churches remained Reformed congregations throughout the unification. On August 23, 1742, he published his True Letter of Warning, August 23, 1742, warning Reformed congregants of Zinzendorf's efforts. Officers of six congregations Falkner Swamp, Oley, Philadelphia, Skippack, Tulpehocken, and White Marsh signed the document. Boehm successfully defended the German Reformed Church.

In 1746, in response to requests from Boehm for additional ministers, the Dutch Reformed sent Michael Schlatter to Pennsylvania, to assist Boehm. Schlatter was also sent to organize congregations and ministers into an ecclesiastical body.

In 1747, Boehm and Schlatter organized the first convention, called Coetus, of the German Reformed Church in the United States. Boehm's constitution was revised during the Coetus of 1748. His letters and pamphlets are documented in Life and Letters of the Rev. John Philip Boehm: Founder of the German Reformed Church in Pennsylvania in 1916 by William J. Hinke. The constitution is published in Daniel Miller's Early History of the Reformed Church in Pennsylvania, which was published in 1906.

== Personal life ==
Boehm, in 1706, married Anna Maria Stehler, daughter of Anna Maria and Hartman Stähler. After her father died, her mother married a second time in 1696 to Johann Philipp Scherer, who also immigrated to Pennsylvania and was a deacon of the Reformed Church in Whitemarsh.

The Boehms' children were 1) Anna Maria, who married Adam Moser; 2) Sabina, who married Ludwig Bitting, 3) Elisabeth, 4) Maria Philippine, 5) Johann Philipp, and 6) Anton Wilhelm. Along with serving as a minister, Boehm had a 200-acre farm, which he purchased in 1736. Four years later, Boehm became a citizen of Pennsylvania.

He died on April 25, 1749, aged sixty-five, at Hellertown. He had given communion in Egypt at Peter Troxell's house and died on his return trip. He was buried under the altar of the church named for him at Whitpain Township.

== Sources ==
- Edwards, Jane; Kessler, Carol; Michael, Ronald; Rembe, Heinrich (January 1, 1974). "Emigration Materials from Lambsheim in the Palatinate". Pennsylvania Folklife Magazine. 23 (2): 40–48.
- Frantz, John B.; Kauffman, Henry; Gaugler, Nancy; Eckerd, W.; Parsons, William; Frantz, John; Adams, Robert; Clarke, Jane (April 1, 1982). "John Philip Boehm: Pioneer Pennsylvania Pastor". Pennsylvania Folklife Magazine. 31 (3): 128–134.
