= George Weiss =

George Weiss may refer to:

- George David Weiss (1921–2010), American songwriter
- George Herbert Weiss (1930–2017), American mathematician
- George Henry Weiss (1898–1946), American writer
- George Weiss (baseball) (1894–1972), American baseball executive
- George Weiss (producer), American film producer
- George Michael Weiss (1697–1762), Dutch Reformed clergyman who worked in New York and Pennsylvania

== See also ==
- Rainbow George Weiss (1940–2021), UK politician
- Georg Fritz Weiß (1822–1893), German operatic bass and actor
