= Presbyterian Church in Paraguay =

- Classification: Protestant
- Orientation: conservative Calvinist
- Theology: Calvinist, Evangelical
- Governance: Presbyterian
- Founder: Evandro Luiz da Silva
- Origin: 1968; Concepción, Paraguay
- Branched from: Presbyterian Church of Brazil
- Congregations: 8
- Members: about 250 communicant members

The Presbyterian Church in Paraguay (Spanish: Iglesia Presbiteriana en el Paraguay, IPP) is a Presbyterian denomination of Calvinist tradition in Paraguay. It began as a church-planting mission of the Presbyterian Church of Brazil (IPB), founded by Brazilian missionaries, and has been autonomous since 2007, although it continues to receive support from the IPB through its missions agency, the Agência Presbiteriana de Missões Transculturais (APMT).

== History ==
=== Origins (1968–1984) ===
In 1968 the IPB's Board of Foreign Missions planned a church-planting "Paraguay project". Paraguay was chosen because it was easy to reach from Brazil and because the work could be carried out with Brazilian resources alone, without foreign agencies. On 14 July 1968 a delegation of the board visited Concepción, where a first service was held in the home of Teófilo Domínguez, with a sermon by Odayr Olivetti.

In January 1970 the missionary Evandro Luiz da Silva and his wife, Maria de Lourdes, settled in Concepción, where they planted a church and began congregations at Belén and Kilómetro 15. The APMT's official podcast also names Lourdinha Garcia as one of the first church planters alongside Silva.

Later Brazilian missionaries included Silas Augusto Tscherne (1974–1978), who consolidated the work and opened the congregation at Hugua Ribas, and Sebastião Silvestre (1979–1980), under whom the first elders and deacons were ordained. From 1981 to 1983 there was no resident missionary. Paraguayan pastors assumed leadership from 1984, when Buenaventura Giménez López was ordained by the Presbytery of Dourados (Mato Grosso do Sul); his brother Eulogio Giménez López was ordained in 1987. Two Paraguayans studied at the Presbyterian seminary in Campinas, Brazil, one of them Buenaventura Giménez.

=== Autonomy and later development ===
The church in San Lorenzo held its first service on 24 May 1987. In 2002 the Paraguayan newspaper ABC Color reported that the church had arrived in the 1970s and that its prayer centres still depended on a Brazilian mission, which paid rent and pastors' salaries. In 2007 the mission obtained autonomy and the IPP was organized by the APMT, the IPB agency created in 2000 for cross-cultural missions.

From about 2013 the "Luz para Asunción" project, led by the missionaries Marcos Paulo and Cristina, planted a church in Asunción. In December 2023, after ten years, it was handed over to the presbytery of the IPP as an organized church with its own premises and a Paraguayan pastor. A former building of the Misión Sudamericana near the Botanical Garden was bought with the help of the APMT and the IPB. In September 2024 the San Lorenzo church marked 37 years of Presbyterian work and was building a new church to replace its old house. By 2022 Buenaventura Giménez had died.

An earlier and unrelated effort took place around 1909, when the Scottish Presbyterian James Hannen worked among the Guaraní with the support of the San Andrés Presbyterian church in Argentina; the results of his work are unknown.

== Statistics and institutions ==
In 2004 the church had 200 members in five congregations and five house fellowships. A report published in Revista Teologia Brasileira lists five churches (Concepción, San Lorenzo, Colonia 25 de Abril, Asunción and Santa Rita), three congregations (Belén, Hugua Ribas and Pedro Juan Caballero) and about 250 communicant members.

The APMT's report for 2010 lists schools in San Lorenzo ("Escuela Paraguay/Brasil"), Asunción ("Escuela Presbiteriana Ebenézer") and Concepción ("Centro Educacional Presbiteriano"), as well as adult literacy classes in Santa Rita. In 2024 the San Lorenzo church ran a Presbyterian school with 32 pupils and a congregation at Ñu Porã.

== Theology ==
The IPP's doctrinal heritage comes from the Presbyterian Church of Brazil, which in turn grew out of the work of 19th-century American Presbyterian missionaries.

=== Origins in the American missionaries of the IPB ===
The IPB traces its origin to Ashbel Green Simonton (1833–1867), who studied at the College of New Jersey and at Princeton Theological Seminary and was sent to Brazil by the Board of Foreign Missions of the Presbyterian Church in the United States of America. He was ordained by the Presbytery of Carlisle on 14 April 1859 and arrived in Rio de Janeiro on 12 August 1859. A sermon by Charles Hodge on the church's duty to teach at home and abroad awakened his interest in foreign missions. He organized the first Presbyterian church in Rio de Janeiro in January 1862, the first presbytery in 1865 and a seminary in 1867.

Accounts of Simonton stress personal piety — devotional Bible reading, prayer, the means of grace and sanctification — and reliance on Christ's sacrifice and the promises of the gospel rather than on personal feeling. He was also wary of numerical growth that lowered moral standards for membership. Missionaries of the southern Presbyterian Church in the United States, among them George Nash Morton and Edward Lane, arrived in 1869 and settled in Campinas.

The Westminster Confession of Faith was published in Portuguese in 1876. When the first national Synod was constituted on 6 September 1888, it adopted the Westminster standards and the Livro de Ordem "with the amendments already adopted by the presbyteries".

=== Standards and government ===
The IPB constitution takes the Holy Scriptures as the "only rule of faith and practice" and the Confession of Faith and the Larger and Shorter Catechisms as its "expository system of doctrine and practice". It defines the IPB as a federation of local churches governed by councils: the session, the presbytery, the synod and the Supreme Council. The IPP has its own presbytery. According to a database of churches, the IPP has adopted:

==== Creeds ====
- Apostles' Creed

==== Confessions ====
- Westminster Confession of Faith
- Westminster Larger Catechism
- Westminster Shorter Catechism
