= Henry Antes =

Henry Antes (1701 – July 20, 1755) was an early 18th-century settler of Pennsylvania, an architect and builder and a leader of the Congregation of God in the Spirit and then the Moravian Church. He is considered one of the most important religious/political leaders of the time, specifically because he preached tolerance and understanding.

His home, Henry Antes House, is recognized as one of the first interracial and nonsectarian boys schools in Pennsylvania and possibly in America. Upon invitation of Antes's son Colonel Frederick Antes, George Washington and his troops stayed at Henry Antes house from September 23 to 26, 1777, during the Philadelphia Campaign. It was designated a National Historic Landmark in 1992.

== Biography ==
Antes was born in 1701 in Freinsheim in Electoral Palatinate. Henry Antes emigrated with his father's family to Pennsylvania Colony about 1720. He partnered with William DeWees to establish the second paper mill in the nation at Wissahickon near Philadelphia, and later married DeWees's daughter, Christina DeWees. He became a leader in the civil and religious affairs of the colony. Known for his judgment and integrity, he was a community leader who made wills and settled estates for his neighbors.

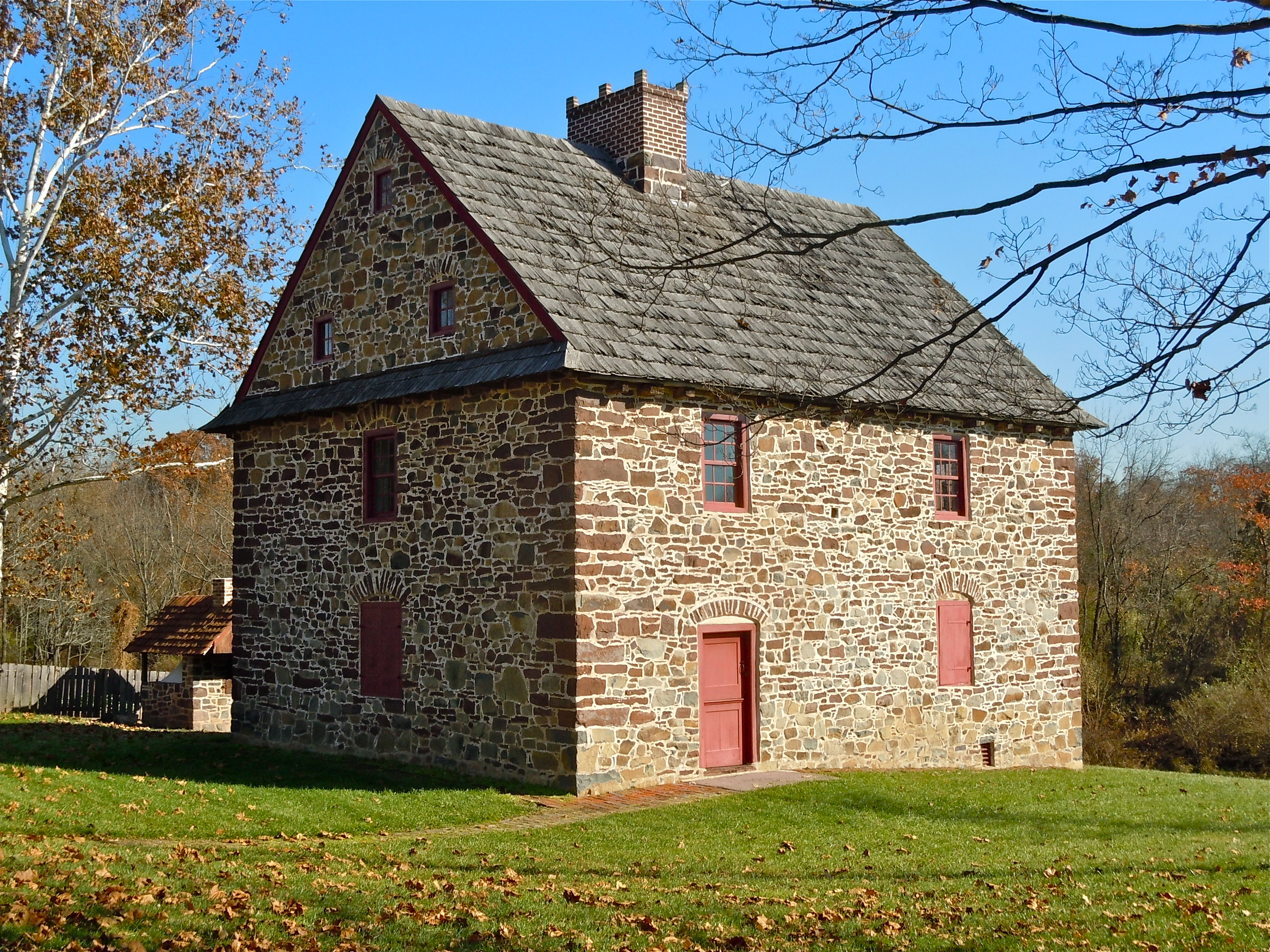
Henry Antes House on the National Register of Historic Places since May 12, 1975, and a National Historic Landmark. Northeast of Pottstown on Colonial Road, in Montgomery County, Pennsylvania. "Medieval" Germanic stone house. Built 1736.

Antes built and designed his home and his own a paper mill in 1736 on the Wissahickon in present-day Upper Frederick Township Montgomery County, Pennsylvania. His home, Henry Antes House, is recognized as one of the first interracial and nonsectarian boys schools in Pennsylvania and possibly in America. The school was called the Frederickstown School and educated as many as 34 boys at one point including a Black boy from St. Thomas, West Indies and a Mohegan Indian. Upon invitation of Antes's son Colonel Frederick Antes, George Washington and his troops stayed at Henry Antes house from September 23 to 26, 1777, during the Philadelphia Campaign. It was designated a National Historic Landmark in 1992. It is now the owned by the Goshenhoppen Historians, Inc.

He was an elder in the Falkner Swamp district of the German Reformed Church. After supporting the Congregation of God in the Spirit, Antes became the chief architect and builder for the Moravian Church having been involved in nearly all of the building activity in the various Moravian settlements. He was the friend of George Whitefield and Nicolaus Zinzendorf, and, after consultation with the latter, assumed the leadership of the religious organization founded in 1741, and known as “Unitas Fratrum,” or Moravians.

He was one of the founders of Bethlehem. He engineered the building of the first mill on the Monocacy in 1743, the Single Brethren House, and the Sisters House in 1744, the Bell House in 1748 and its two additions in 1748 and 1749, the Brethren House or Colonial Hall in 1748, the Crown Inn, and numerous mills and industrial buildings. When the Moravians established the first ferry crossing the Lehigh River, the enterprise was called Henry Antes in his honor. In 1745, the governor appointed him justice of the peace for Northampton County and in 1752 justice of the peace for Philadelphia County.

He died July 20, 1755, in Fredericktown, Pennsylvania.

== Relatives ==
His brother-in-law was William DeWees, who owned Valley Forge, Pennsylvania, during Washington's encampment during the winter of 1777. He was also to related David Rittenhouse, who was his wife's aunt Wilhelmina DeWees Rittenhouse's grandson.

His son Philip Frederick (or just Frederick) Antes (July 2, 1730 – September 20, 1801, in Lancaster, Pennsylvania) held political and military offices, and was a judge of the court of common pleas. During the American Revolution, British General William Howe put a bounty on his head for 200 pounds. In 1776, in company with a Mr. Potts at Warwick furnace, he successfully cast an 18-pound cannon, the first cannon ever made in America. A friend of George Washington's, Frederick invited Washington and his troops to stay at Henry Antes house from September 23 to 26, 1777, during the Philadelphia Campaign.

Henry's daughter, Anna Catherina, joined the Moravian Church, married a physician and moved to Bethabara, the first Moravian settlement in North Carolina.

John Antes (1740–1811) was his son and the first American Moravian missionary to travel and work in Egypt, one of the earliest American-born chamber music composers, and the maker of perhaps the earliest surviving bowed string instrument made in America.

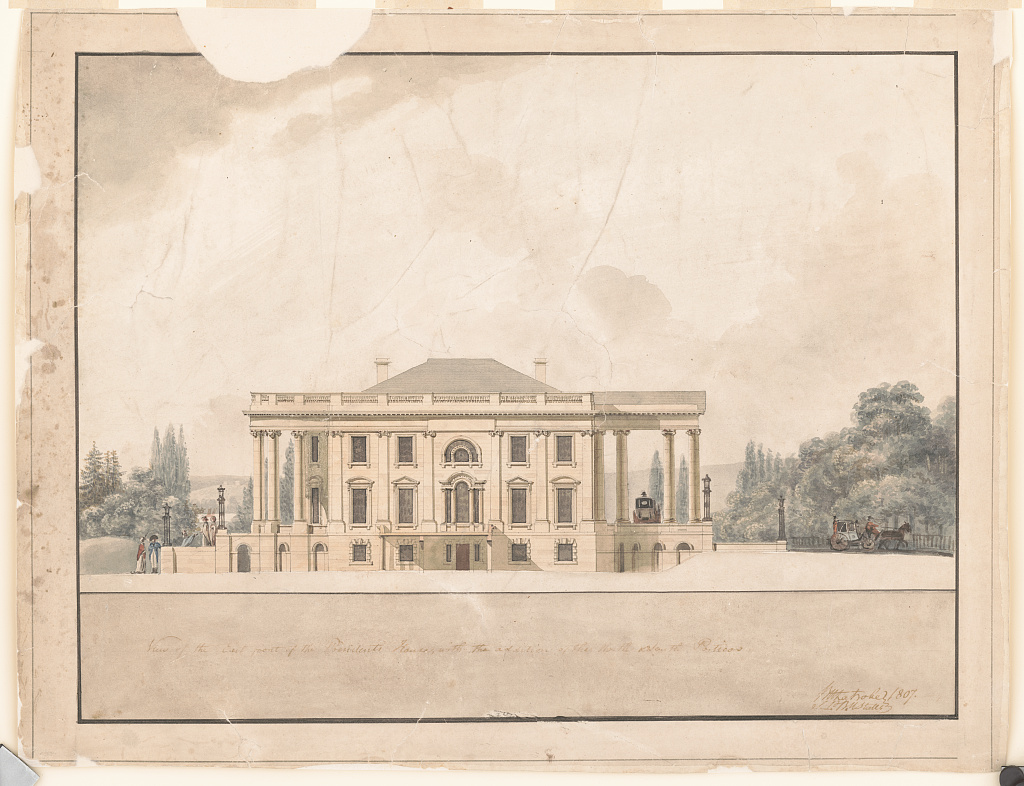
Benjamin Henry Latrobe's drawings for porticoes to the White House

Benjamin Henry Latrobe his grandson and so called "father of American architecture." He was the second Architect of the Capitol and responsible for the design of the White House porticos.

Judge Henry Barnhart, his great-grandson, was an elected member of the Legislature of Centre County, Pa, serving two terms.
