= José Manoel da Conceição =

Brazilian pastor (1822–1873)

José Manouel da Conceicao (1822–1873) was a Brazilian Catholic priest, later converted to the Reformed faith and joined the Presbyterian Church of Brazil and become the first Brazilian pastor of this evangelical denomination. His ordination was on December 17, 1865. He served as an evangelist in São Paulo. Because of his conversion to the Reformed faith Conceicao had been excommunicated from the Roman Catholic church. He was often injured in his travels, and died in Vale do Paraíba due to the injuries sustained.

== His convert ==
He was born in March 1822 in São Paulo. Later in 1844 and 1845 he was ordained as a deacon in the Roman Church. Some works of Laemmert made him to doubt in the Catholic church. He attended a Protestant worship performed by Latimer Blackford, and later made friendship with Ashbel Green Simonton.
