= Michael Schlatter =

Michael Schlatter (14 July 1716 – 31 October 1790) was an American German Reformed clergyman.

== Biography ==
Schlatter was born in St. Gallen, Switzerland, where he was educated at the local gymnasium, after which he was tutored in theology, and then proceeded to the University of Leyden and then the University of Helmstedt in Brunswick. He then returned to his tutor for some time before being ordained in 1739. He taught for several years in Holland and then entered the German Reformed ministry. He officiated a few months in Switzerland, and then offered his services as a missionary to the German Reformed emigrants in Philadelphia in 1746, after learning of a request made to the Dutch Reformed Church for ministers by German Reformed clergyman John Phillip Boehm and went to Pennsylvania in that year, arriving on 6 August. He served as pastor of the united churches of Germantown and Philadelphia in 1746–51, organized a synod which met in Philadelphia in 1747, and made extended missionary tours among the German Reformed settlers in Pennsylvania, Maryland, Virginia, New Jersey and New York State.

In 1751, he returned to Europe to report on his work. In Amsterdam, he published (1751) a journal of his experiences and transactions in America, with an account of the Reformed congregations and their dearth of pastors. Of this book, he made a German translation (Frankfort, 1752), and afterward it was rendered into English by Rev. David Thomson, of Amsterdam, and distributed throughout Great Britain. As a result of Schlatter's appeal, £20,000 was raised in England and Holland for the establishment of free schools among the Germans in America. He also secured the assistance of six young preachers, and 700 Bibles.

In March 1752, Schlatter returned to Philadelphia with the money and preachers, and in 1755 withdrew from his pastoral activities to become superintendent of the establishment of the schools among the Germans under the auspices of the Society for the Propagation of the Knowledge of God among the Germans, a group of people from London, of whom William Smith was secretary. The schools were unpopular with the Germans, and in 1757 Schlatter resigned his superintendency. He then accepted an offer by Lord Loudoun to become chaplain of the Royal American Regiment, which he accompanied on an expedition to Louisburg. He remained with the army until 1759, and then preached at Chestnut Hill and surrounding places. In 1764 he was a chaplain to the 2nd Pennsylvania Battalion under Henry Bouquet on a mission against the Indians.

In 1777, while still attached to the British Army, he refused to obey orders on account of sympathy with the colonial cause. He was imprisoned, and his house was plundered. He died near Philadelphia.

== Family ==
He married Maria Henrica Schleidorn of New York City, and they had nine children, six of whom survived them.
