= Henry Antes House =

Historic house in Pennsylvania, United States

- U.S. National Register of Historic Places
- U.S. National Historic Landmark
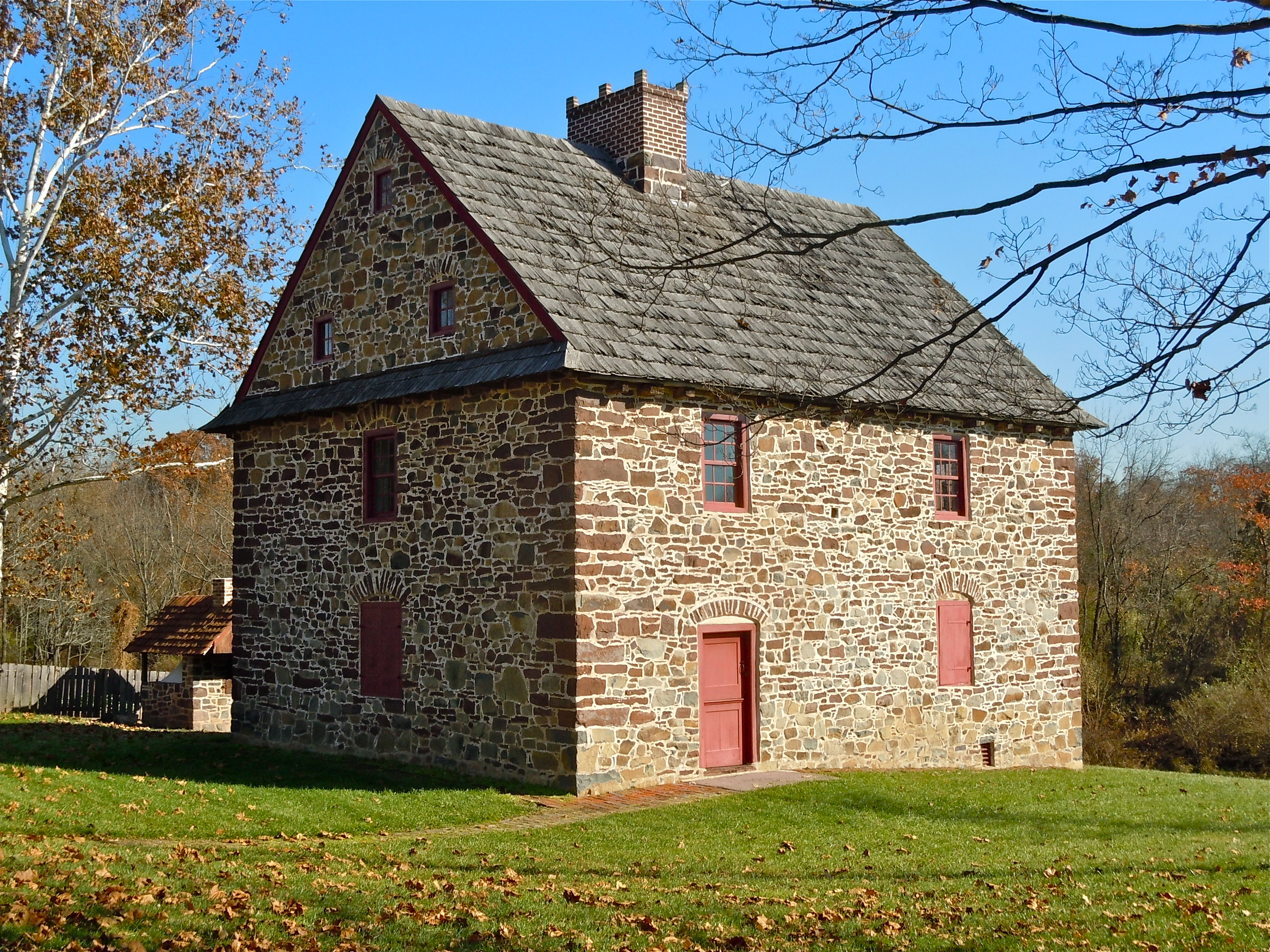
- Antes House, November 2011

- Location within Pennsylvania Location within the United States
- Location: 318 Colonial Road, Perkiomenville, Pennsylvania, US
- Coordinates: 40°17′32″N 75°32′26″W
- Area: 1.3 acres (0.53 ha)
- Built: 1736
- Architectural style: Colonial
- NRHP reference No.: 75001657

Significant dates
- Added to NRHP: May 12, 1975
- Designated NHL: April 27, 1992

The Henry Antes House is a historic house museum in Upper Frederick Township in Montgomery County, Pennsylvania, United States. Built in 1736 by Henry Antes, it is a particularly high-quality example of a Moravian settlement house, with intact original interior finishes. It was designated a National Historic Landmark in 1992, and is now operated as a museum by Goschenhoppen Historians, a local preservation group.

== Description ==
The Henry Antes House stands in a rural setting, roughly midway between Pottstown and Perkiomenville on the south side of Colonial Road a short way east of its crossing of Swamp Creek. It is a two-story structure, built out of local rubblestone and covered by a gabled roof. It is two bays wide and one deep, with the entrance in the leftmost bay of the front facade. Ground-floor openings for doors and windows are topped by segmented-arch stone headers, while those on the second floor are butted against the eaves on the long sides and topped by arches on the short sides. Small windows in the gable ends also have arched tops. The roof is made of wooden shingles.

== History ==
The house was designed and built by Henry Antes in 1736. It stands today as an example of Moravian settlement houses, in particular of a German three-room plan house. The house is unusual because so much of its original interior finish, including ceilings and board partition walls, have survived. Henry Antes, while largely unknown now, was an important regional religious and political figure of the 18th century, and one of the region's best-known master builders.

In the American Revolutionary War, the house served as headquarters for General George Washington, September 23 to 26, 1777, during the Philadelphia Campaign. Henry's son, Colonel Philip Frederick Antes (1730–1801), was an officer in the 6th Philadelphia Militia.

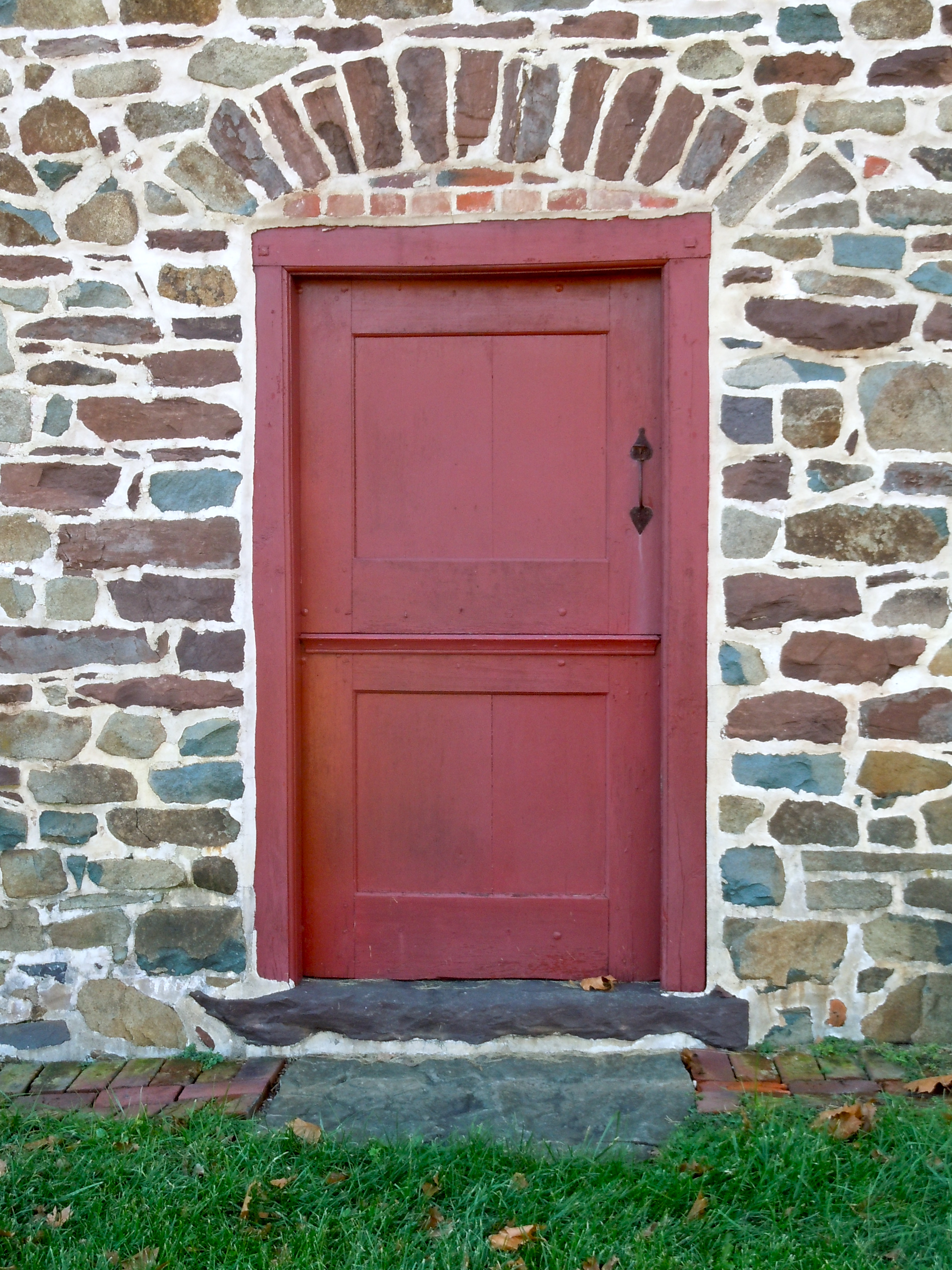
Dutch door on the northeast side of the house

It is now owned by the Goschenhoppen Historians, who restored the house and operate it as a museum, offering tours by appointment.

== See also ==
- List of Washington's Headquarters during the Revolutionary War
- List of National Historic Landmarks in Pennsylvania
- National Register of Historic Places listings in Montgomery County, Pennsylvania
