= Presbyterian Cathedral of Rio de Janeiro =

First Presbyterian church in Brazil

- Catedral Presbiteriana do Rio de Janeiro
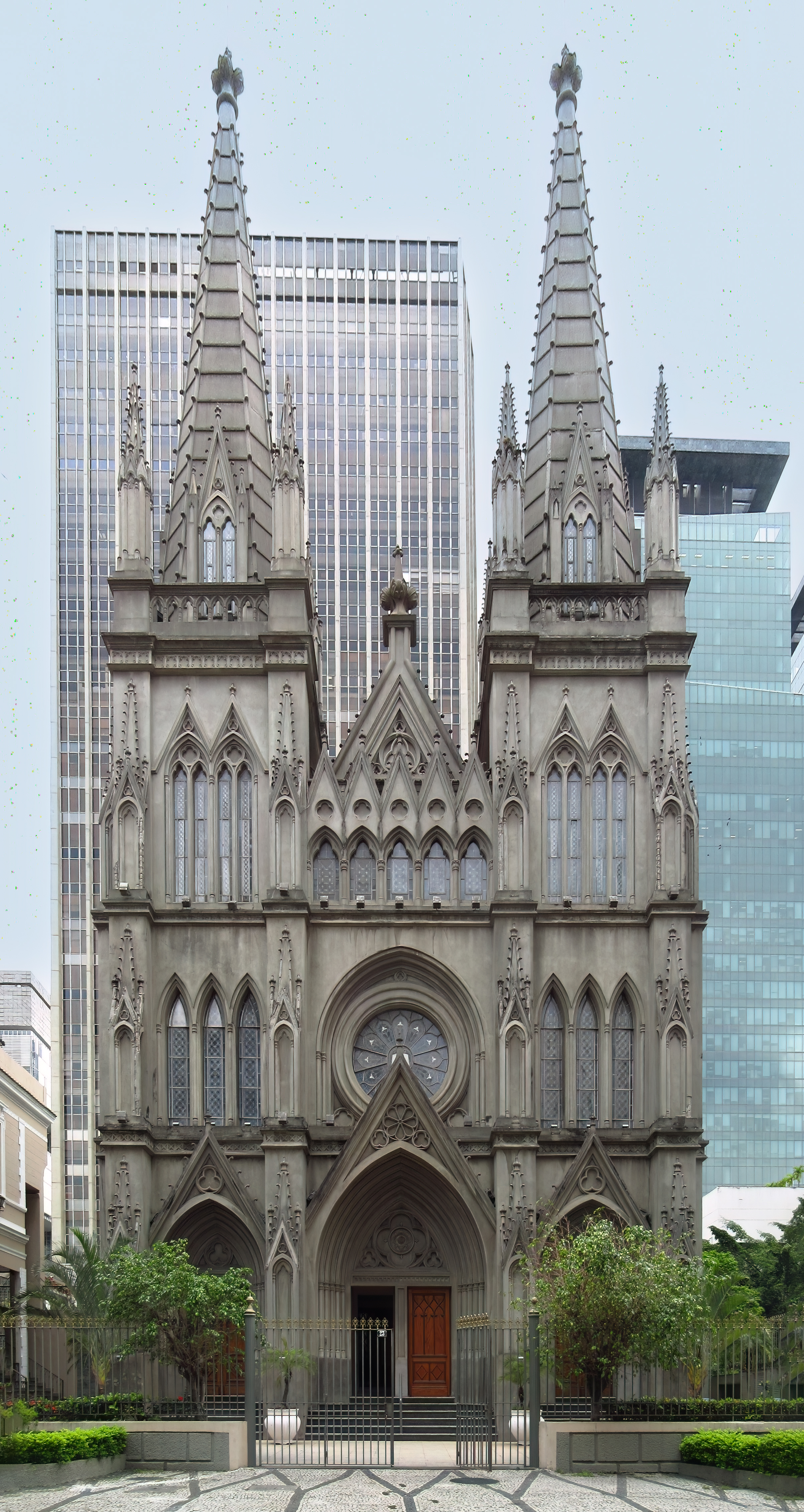
- Presbyterian Cathedral of Rio de Janeiro

- Location within Brazil
- 22.9079°S 43.1812°W
- Location: Rio de Janeiro
- Address: Rua Silva Jardim, 23 - Centro, Rio de Janeiro - RJ, 20050-060
- Country: Brazil
- Language: Portuguese
- Denomination: Presbyterian
- Website: www.catedralrio.org.br

Architecture
- Functional status: Active

The Presbyterian Cathedral of Rio de Janeiro (Portuguese: Catedral Presbiteriana do Rio de Janeiro), shortly the Presbyterian Cathedral, is a historic Presbyterian congregation of the Presbyterian Church of Brazil (PCB). The Cathedral was the first Presbyterian church in the country.

== History ==
Ashbel Green Simonton established the church on January 12, 1862. It used various sites until it acquired its current site in December 1870. On March 29, 1874, the building was opened as the first church building of the Presbyterians in Brazil. During 1897–1925 Rev. Álvaro Reis was the pastor. His influence and service was recognized through the name of a middle school and a square in Rio. In August 1926 Rev. Matthias Gomes de Santos remade the project of constructing a new building. He invited the architect Ascanio Viana who redesigned the building in a Neo-Gothic style. This work lasted about 14 years. It has been renovated several times, most recently in 2002. The church celebrated its 150th anniversary on Thursday, January 12, 2012.

== Pastors ==
- Ashbel Green Simonton: 1862–67
- Alexander Latimer Bradford: 1867–1874
- Alvaro Reis: 1897–1925
- Matthias Gomes dos Santos: 1926–47
- Amantino Adorno Vassao: 1947–81
- Guilhermino Cunha: 1981–2015
- Jorge Patrocínio: 2015–present
