= Protestant Cemetery, São Paulo =

Cemetery in São Paulo, Brazil

Cemitério dos Protestantes
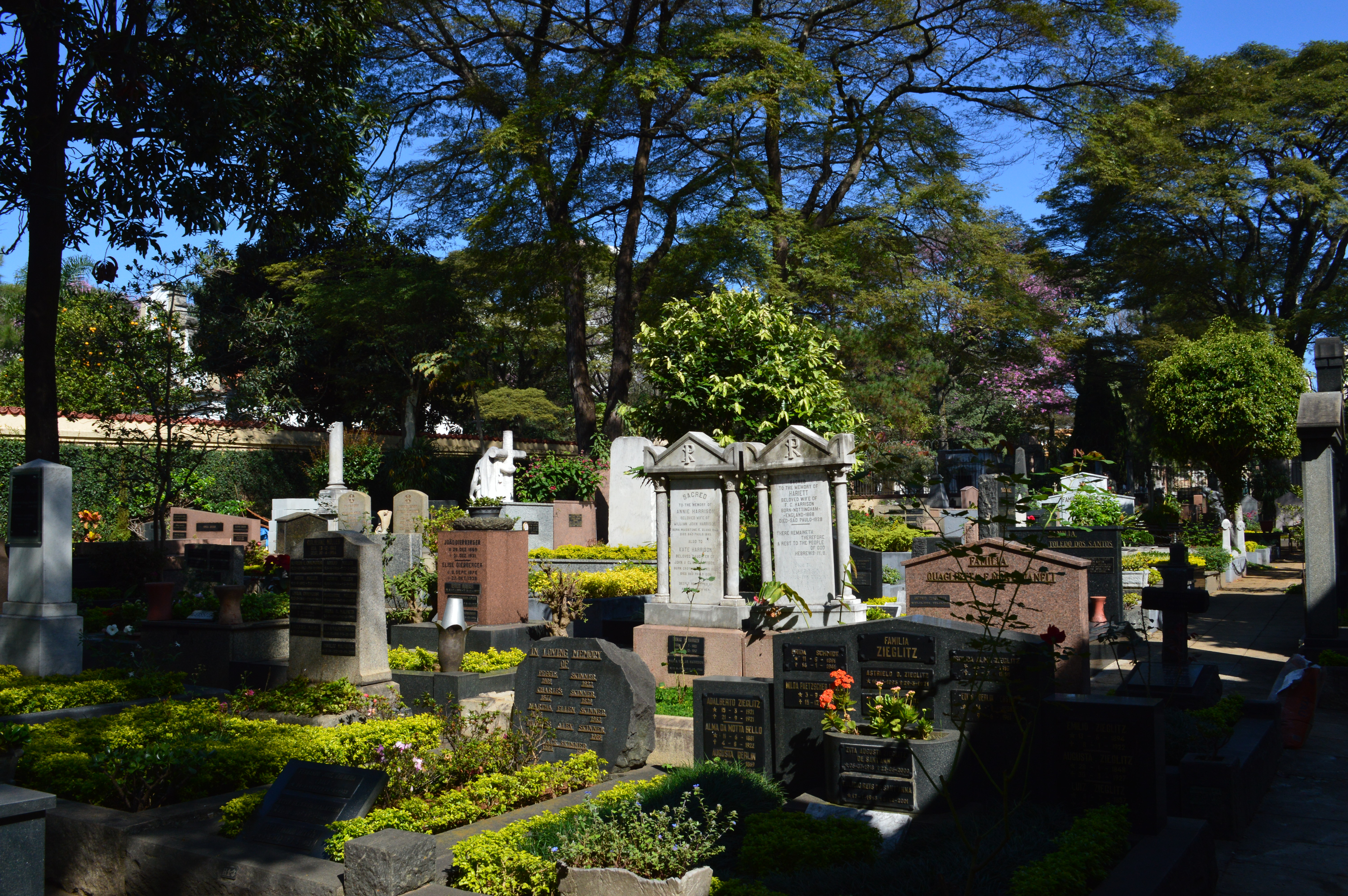
- Cemitério dos Protestantes
- Interactive map of Cemitério dos Protestantes

Details
- Established: 1858
- Location: Consolação, São Paulo
- Country: Brazil
- Coordinates: 23°32′59″S 46°39′20″W
- Type: Protestant
- Website: ACEMPRO
- Find a Grave: Cemitério dos Protestantes

The Cemitério dos Protestantes ("Cemetery of the Protestants") is a historic Protestant cemetery located in the city of São Paulo, Brazil. The cemetery is listed by CONDEPHAAT (Council for the Protection of Historical, Archaeological, Artistic and Touristic Patrimony) for its historical, cultural and social importance for the state of São Paulo.

== History ==
=== Background ===
When the German professor of law Julius Frank died on 19 June 1841, his students decided to bury him within the faculty. The plan was agreed upon and supported by councillor Brotero. However, since Julius Frank was a Protestant, the Roman Catholic bishop Manuel at first protested this decision, because the envisioned burial place was located at the "sacred ground" of the former Convent of the Franciscan Friars. Councillor Brotero eventually managed to get the bishop's consent.

The incident triggered both Catholic and Protestant foreigners living in São Paulo, to build the Cemitério dos Estrangeiros ("Cemetery of the Foreigners") in the Paulistano neighbourhood of Luz in 1844. The cemetery was closed after only a few burials, because the land near São Caetano Road had to make way for a wider Tiradentes Avenue.

=== Protestant Cemetery ===
In answer to the closure of the Foreigner's Cemetery, Lutherans, Anglicans and some Presbyterians founded the Associação Cemitério dos Protestantes ("Association of the Cemetery of the Protestants") to create a new burial site. In accordance with Carl Rath's plans, an administration building and chapel were built. The first burial took place in 1858.

== Notable interments ==
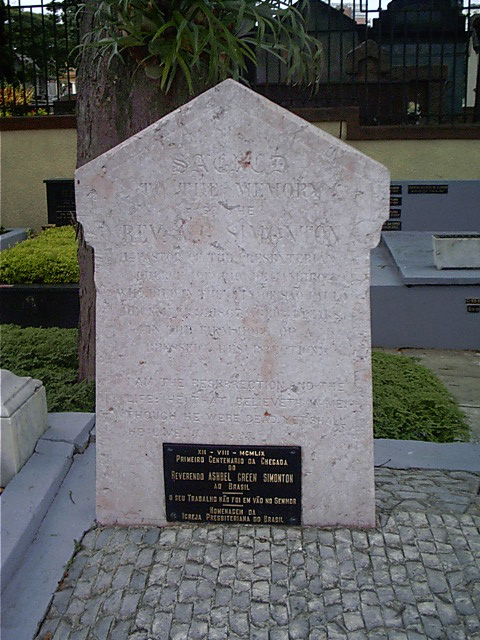
Tombstone of Ashbel Green Simonton

Among the interments are many people belonging to Protestant and Catholic communities. There also used to be some Jews, but their remains were later moved to the Israelite Cemetery of Butantã.

- Ashbel Green Simonton (1833–1867), Presbyterian minister and missionary

== External links and source ==
- Cemitério dos Protestantes - ACEMPRO
- Cemitério dos Protestantes - BillionGraves
