= Revived Reformed Presbyterian Church of Brazil =

- Classification: Protestant
- Orientation: Pentecostal
- Polity: Presbyterian
- Region: Brazil
- Founder: Fernando Carlos Azevedo Pinto
- Origin: May 5, 1997; Itapipoca, Ceará, Brazil
- Separated from: Presbyterian Church of Brazil
- Congregations: 24 (2009)

The Revived Reformed Presbyterian Church of Brazil - in Portuguese Igreja Presbiteriana Reformada Avivada (IPRAB) - is a denomination Pentecostal, founded on May 5, 1997, in Itapipoca, Ceará, by pastor Fernando Carlos Azevedo Pinto.

The emphasis on the doctrines of Total Depravity and Justification by faith.

IPRAB grew by planting churches, mostly in Ceará. In 2009, the denomination consisted of 24 churches, spread across Brazil and Bolivia.

In Itapipoca, the IPRAB is known for its social work, such as the maintenance of rehabilitation homes for drug addicts. and for the holding of annual religious events, which attract visitors to the city.

In Fortaleza, the name is known for its work, together with the City Hall, in preventing drug use among young people.
