= Methodist Church in Brazil =

The Methodist Church in Brazil was founded by American missionaries in 1867.

== History ==
The Methodist Episcopal Church in the US brought Methodism to Brazil in 1835; however, missionaries left in 1841 due to lack of funding. Members of the Methodist Episcopal Church (South) returned in 1867 with a view to preaching to Confederate expatriates who had settled in Brazil at the close of the American Civil War. By 1880 the church included Brazilian members and pastors.

The church became autonomous in 1930.

== Demographics ==
In 2013, it had 400,000 members.

== Head of church ==
In 1934 Cesar Dacorso was elected as the first Brazilian bishop.

In 2023, the head of the church is Bishop Adonias Pereira do Lago.

== See also ==
- Protestantism in Brazil
