= Alexander Latimer Blackford =

American Presbyterian missionary

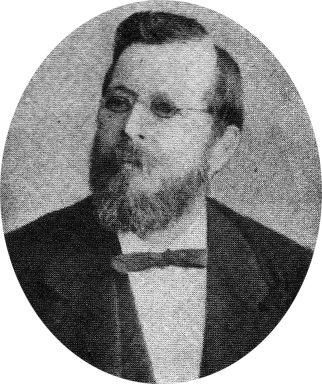
Latimer Blackford

Rev. Alexander Latimer Blackford was an American Presbyterian missionary in Brazil born on January 9, 1829, in Martins Ferry, Ohio.

He graduated from the Western Theological Seminary in 1859 and decided to work in Brazil as an assistant of Ashbel Green Simonton. On March 5, 1865, he organised the Presbyterian Church in São Paulo and became its first pastor.

Blackford later organised the Presbyterian Church in Brotas in November 1865, the third Presbyterian church in Brazil. With 3 organised congregations, Simonron and Chamberlain organised the Presbytery of São Paulo on December 16 of the same year.

From 1880 Latimer worked to develop Presbyterianism in Salvador, Bahia. In 1888 he became the first moderator of the Presbyterian Church of Brazil.

In 1890 on vacation in Atlanta, he became severely ill; he died on March 14.
