= Congregation of God in the Spirit =

Christian religious movement in Pennsylvania founded in 1742

Congregation of God in the Spirit was a movement started by a Moravian bishop and the court preacher of Berlin. Composed of different religious elements, it was founded in August 1742, in the seventh Synod held that year. Congregants from the Reformed Church in the United States who joined this movement said that they were also Reformed. It grew out of an attempt to unite German religious sects in Pennsylvania, including the Reformed, Lutherans, Mennonites, Dunkards, Schwenkfelder, and mystics, like the Inspirationalists. The religious groups grew out of the Reformation in Germany and German Switzerland.

When the movement was founded, there were few ministers to lead congregations. With little structure, congregants in pioneering communities created their own version of the faith. In 1736, John Adam Gruber of Oley, Pennsylvania sought to unite the many diverse religious groups. Henry Antes of Falkner Swamp became an early leader of the movement and then the Moravian Church.

Count Nicolaus von Zinzendorf, who established Moravian Church missions in Pennsylvania, viewed the church as the "congregation of God in the Spirit and the little flock of the wounded Lamb," where the local congregations were the flocks of Christ and the church was Congregation of God in the Spirit.
