= Continuing church =

Continuing churches are Christian denominations that form when a church union between different denominations occurs, and members or congregations do not wish to join the new denomination, but instead choose to continue the heritage and identity of their old denomination. The phrase is sometimes used by denominations that separate from a parent body and wish to express their faithfulness to the denomination's heritage.

== Examples ==
Continuing churches are particularly common in Presbyterianism and are present in Australia, Canada, Scotland, and the United States. Examples include the Free Church of Scotland (1900), the Cumberland Presbyterian Church (1906), the Presbyterian Church in Canada (1925), the United Free Church of Scotland (1929), the Congregational Federation (1972), the Presbyterian Church in America (1973), and the Presbyterian Church of Australia (1977).

In the US, the ordination of women beginning in the 1970s played a major part in the formation of a number of Continuing Churches, as did Fundamentalist and Evangelical convictions. The Southern Methodist Church (1940) and the Evangelical Church (1968), for example, were both bodies which refused to join with the Methodist Church the United Methodist Church, respectively, on grounds of theology and polity. And there are many remnants of the former Congregationalist denominations which now comprise the United Church of Christ merger, such as the Conservative Congregational Christian Conference (1948) and the National Association of Congregational Christian Churches (1955). The North American Baptist landscape is replete with organizations that originate from a refusal to join a larger body.

In Australia, both Fellowship of Congregational Churches and the Presbyterian Church of Australia continued after the Uniting Church in Australia formed in 1977.

Examples of denominations that separated from a parent body rather than staying out of a union include the Continuing Anglican movement and the Free Church of Scotland (Continuing). In the case of the Presbyterian Church in America, it separated from the Presbyterian Church in the United States in 1973, ten years before that body merged with the United Presbyterian Church in the United States of America to form the Presbyterian Church (USA). The Association of Free Lutheran Congregations was formed by Lutheran Free Church members who declined to join the American Lutheran Church. American Lutheran Church congregations who subsequently opted out of the merger into the Evangelical Lutheran Church in America formed the American Association of Lutheran Churches.

== Legal issues ==
Some continuing churches have been embroiled in legal disputes with parent bodies over property and/or the right to use the original denominational name. In Canada, the United Church of Canada Act expressly stipulated that the "Presbyterian Church in Canada" had ceased to exist, but the continuing Presbyterians continued to use the name and the Act was amended in 1939 to recognize their right to do so. Conversely, the Presbyterian Church of Australia was recognized as a continuing church in the Presbyterian Church of Australia Act of 1971, before the church union occurred.

The continuing Free Church of Scotland entered into a protracted legal dispute with the United Free Church of Scotland after the majority of the Free Church entered into church union with the United Presbyterian Church in 1900. This was finally resolved by the Bannatyne v. Overtoun decision in 1904. The court ruled that the continuing church was the "true heir of the previous denomination's properties."

== Character ==
Many continuing churches have found their identity in a commitment to their denominational tradition's historic doctrinal standards. For example, the Presbyterian Church in America resolved to maintain the "historic doctrinal position of the Reformed faith as expressed in the Westminster Standards." M. H. Ogilvie notes that the continuing Presbyterians in Canada "clung to the inherited marks of Presbyterianism: the subordinate standard of the Westminster Confession of Faith, the Presbyterian polity of government by church courts and perhaps a dash of the Covenanting spirit. The continuing Presbyterian Church of Australia also "remained committed to Presbyterian polity and affirmed a more conservative Reformed theological stance." One the other hand, motivations on the part of individuals and congregations for staying out of church unions was often mixed. Some continuing Presbyterians in Australia and Canada (described as the "haggis and bagpipe" group) were "Scots nationalists who regarded the kirk and their ethnic inheritance as Scots as being coterminous."

== See also ==
- Confessing movement, conservative movement within Mainline Protestantism
