= Conservative Presbyterian Church in Brazil =

- Classification: Protestant
- Theology: conservative Calvinist
- Polity: Presbyterian
- Moderator: Rev. Welerson Alves Duarte
- Region: Brazil
- Origin: February 11, 1940; 85 years ago
- Separated from: Independent Presbyterian Church of Brazil (which in turn split from the Presbyterian Church of Brazil in 1903)
- Congregations: 92 (2018)
- Members: 4,371 (2018)
- Official website: www.ipcb.org.br

The Igreja Presbiteriana Conservadora do Brasil (Portuguese: Igreja Presbiterianan Conservadora do Brazil) (IPCB) is a Presbyterian Reformed denomination, founded in 1940 by the churches and members that separated from the Independent Presbyterian Church of Brazil (IPIB). The main reason for the split was the decision of the IPIB General Assembly, in 1938, to appoint a commission to draw up a new confession of faith. This confession would replace the Westminster Confession of Faith and be tolerant of annihilationism. The members who opposed the change split from the IPIB and formed the IPCB. It is currently the third largest reformed denomination in Brazil, right after the Presbyterian Church of Brazil (IPB) and a IPIB, preserving traditional positions of Presbyterianism.

== History ==
The Conservative Presbyterian Church of Brazil (IPCB) emerged on February 11, 1940, when, after two years of debates and internal discussions on doctrinal issues, the 2nd Independent Presbyterian Church of São Paulo shut down Independent Presbyterian Church of Brazil (IPIB) to become Conservative Presbyterian Church of São Paulo.

The conflict began when the IPIB Synod, in 1938, recognized the existence of different positions within the denomination regarding Annihilationism and eternal punishment and appointed a commission to draft a new confession, which would replace the Westminster Confession of Faith hitherto adopted by the denomination. The 2nd Independent Presbyterian Church of São Paulo did not accept this modification and left the denomination.

The first presbytery of the denomination consisted of 11 churches and 5 pastors or ministers. A seminary was organised in 1954. A Missionary Department was formed and as the church began to develop, some churches are among indigenous people.

== Demographics ==
According to denomination statistics, it had 3,578 members in 2006. In 2018, it published new statistics, which reported 4,371 members (3,716 communicants and 655 non-communicants), with a growth of 22.16% between 2006 and 2018. In the same period, the Brazilian population grew 11.31%.

The IPCB consisted, in 2018, of 92 ecclesiastical work fronts with church or congregation status: 56 local churches, 19 local congregations, 4 presbyteral congregations, 13 congregations, congregations of the Missionary Department. In addition, it had 12 preaching points. The denomination is, therefore, present in 11 states of the federation (Central-West Region: Goiás, Mato Grosso do Sul; Northern Brazil: Acre, Amazonas, Rondônia; Northeast Region: Alagoas, Bahia, Pernambuco; Southeast Region: Minas Gerais, São Paulo; Region Southern: Paraná).

On July 19, 2009, the IPCB organized its General Meeting. Due to the growth of churches, in 2017, the denomination already consisted of 8 Presbyteries (Bandeirante, Brasil-Central, Centro-Sul, Guarulhos, Oeste Paulista, Paraná, Paulistano and Piratininga) and two Synods (Southeast and Midwest).

== Theology ==
The denomination subscribe:

- Apostles Creed
- Westminster Confession of Faith
- Westminster Shorter Catechism
- Westminster Larger Catechism

The IPCB does not admit ordination of woman and therefore only men can be pastors, elders and deacons. Since its foundation it has been an anti-Masonic church, cessationist, governs worship by the Regulative principle of worship and does not practice exclusive psalmody. The denomination also opposes the practice of clapping during the liturgy.

== Journal and seminary ==
The church publishes its own newspaper the Conservative Presbyterian. It owns a seminary in San Bernando de Campo founded in 1953. In 1983 the denomination founded the Missionary Department and new church plans in various Brazilian cities are underway.
