= Reformed Church in the United States =

Historical Reformed denomination

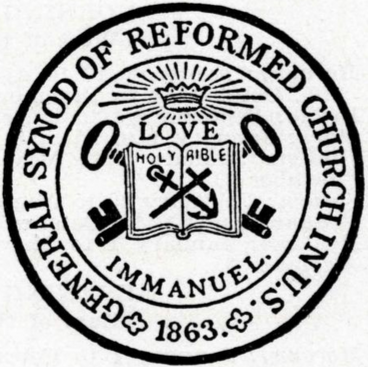
- Abbreviation: RCUS
- Orientation: Protestant
- Theology: Reformed
- Polity: Presbyterian
- Region: United States
- Language: German, English
- Founder: John Phillip Boehm
- Origin: 1725
- Independence: Dutch Reformed Church (1793)
- Branched from: Reformed churches of the Palatinate
- Separations: Eureka Classis
- Merged into: Evangelical and Reformed Church
- Tertiary institutions: Calvin College (Cleveland, Ohio) Catawba College; Allentown College for Women; Franklin & Marshall College; Heidelberg College; Woman's College of Frederick; Mission House College Ursinus College
- Seminaries: Calvin Theological Seminary (Cleveland, Ohio) Central Theological Seminary; Lancaster Theological Seminary Mission House Seminary
- Other name: Coetus of the Reformed Ministerium of the Congregations in Pennsylvania (1747–1793) High German Reformed Church (1793–1869)

The Reformed Church in the United States (RCUS), originally the German Reformed Church, was a Protestant denomination that existed from 1725 to 1934. Established by German immigrants in Pennsylvania under ministers like John Philip Boehm, it was rooted in the Continental Reformed tradition and held to the Heidelberg Catechism. Notable figures included Church historian Philip Schaff and theologian John Williamson Nevin, both representatives of the RCUS's own Mercersburg Theology.

In 1934, the RCUS joined with the Evangelical Synod of North America to form the Evangelical and Reformed Church (now part of the United Church of Christ). The Eureka Classis withdrew at this time and would later assume the RCUS name as a continuing church.

== History ==
Originally known as the German Reformed Church, the RCUS was organized in 1725 thanks largely to the efforts of John Philip Boehm, who immigrated in 1720. He organized the first congregation of German Reformed believers in 1725 near Philadelphia, Pennsylvania, some of them descendants and German immigrants from the turn of the century. Some had immigrated from the Palatine area. He was later joined by other ministers such as George Weiss and Michael Schlatter.

Boehm was eventually ordained by the Classis of Amsterdam in 1729, which oversaw the American branch of the Dutch Reformed Church (now the Reformed Church in America). The German Reformed remained under Dutch Reformed oversight until 1793, when the German Reformed adopted their own constitution. In the 1740s, Count Nicolaus von Zinzendorf, bishop of the Moravian Church, visited Pennsylvania, with the hopes of uniting the German Lutherans and Reformed with the Moravians, which Boehm staunchly resisted.

During the 19th century the German Reformed Church debated issues such as revivalism and especially the Mercersburg Theology of John Nevin and Philip Schaff. In 1866 Samuel Miller, a member of the German Reformed Church, published a work entitled A Treatise on Mercersburg Theology: Mercersburg and Modern Theology Compared. Other controversies, such as debates over liturgy, also occurred in the 19th century. In the second half of the century, the congregations formed their first General Synod, held in 1863. In the 1870s and 1880s, there were attempts, albeit unsuccessful, to unite with the related Dutch Reformed Church.

During the twentieth century, the RCUS increasingly shifted toward ecumenism and higher criticism of the Bible. More conservative clergy and members united to form the Eureka Classis of the RCUS, in order to continue classical Reformed worship and polity. The RCUS is known for its strong anti Catholic rhetoric and even has anti Catholic and anti pope references in its Heidelberg Catechism.

In 1934, the RCUS merged with the Evangelical Synod of North America (ESNA) to form the Evangelical and Reformed Church. ESNA featured a mix of both Lutheran and Reformed theology, reflecting the Prussian Union of Churches.

The Eureka Classis, however, abjured that merger and decided to identify as the "continuing" Reformed Church in the United States. The classis objected to the ESNA's admixture of Lutheran teachings with Reformed practices; most of its churches and members had descended from late 19th-century immigration either from parts of Germany where Reformed confessionalism had taken hold, or from the Volga River region of Russia, where ethnic Germans had been isolated from liberalizing influences in the motherland.

By contrast, most RCUS churches, classes, and synods located in the eastern United States had significantly assimilated into generalized or what became known as mainline American Protestantism, and become more ecumenical. The Evangelical and Reformed Church in 1957 merged with the Congregational Christian Churches (which had formed from earlier Congregational and Restorationist churches) to become the United Church of Christ. It has been known for its strongly liberal doctrine and moral stances.

The RCUS has continued to lose communicant members over the years. While they occasionally have up years in membership their overall numbers have declined significantly in the last 50 years and now list approximately 2600 communicant members. Statistics are found in the RCUS Synod abstracts. https://rcus.org/synodical-abstracts/?v=2ecd53e541df
