= Santa Margarida, Minas Gerais =

Brazilian municipality located in the state of Minas Gerais

Coordinates: 20°23′02″S 42°15′03″W

- Municipality
- Coat of arms
- Interactive map of Santa Margarida, Minas Gerais
- Country: Brazil
- State: Minas Gerais
- Region: Southeast
- Time zone: UTC−3 (BRT)

Location of Santa Margarida within Minas Gerais

Santa Margarida is a Brazilian municipality located in the state of Minas Gerais. The city belongs to the mesoregion of Zona da Mata and to the microregion of Manhuaçu. As of 2020, the estimated population was 16,302.

== See also ==
- List of municipalities in Minas Gerais
