= Santa Rita de Minas =

- Municipality
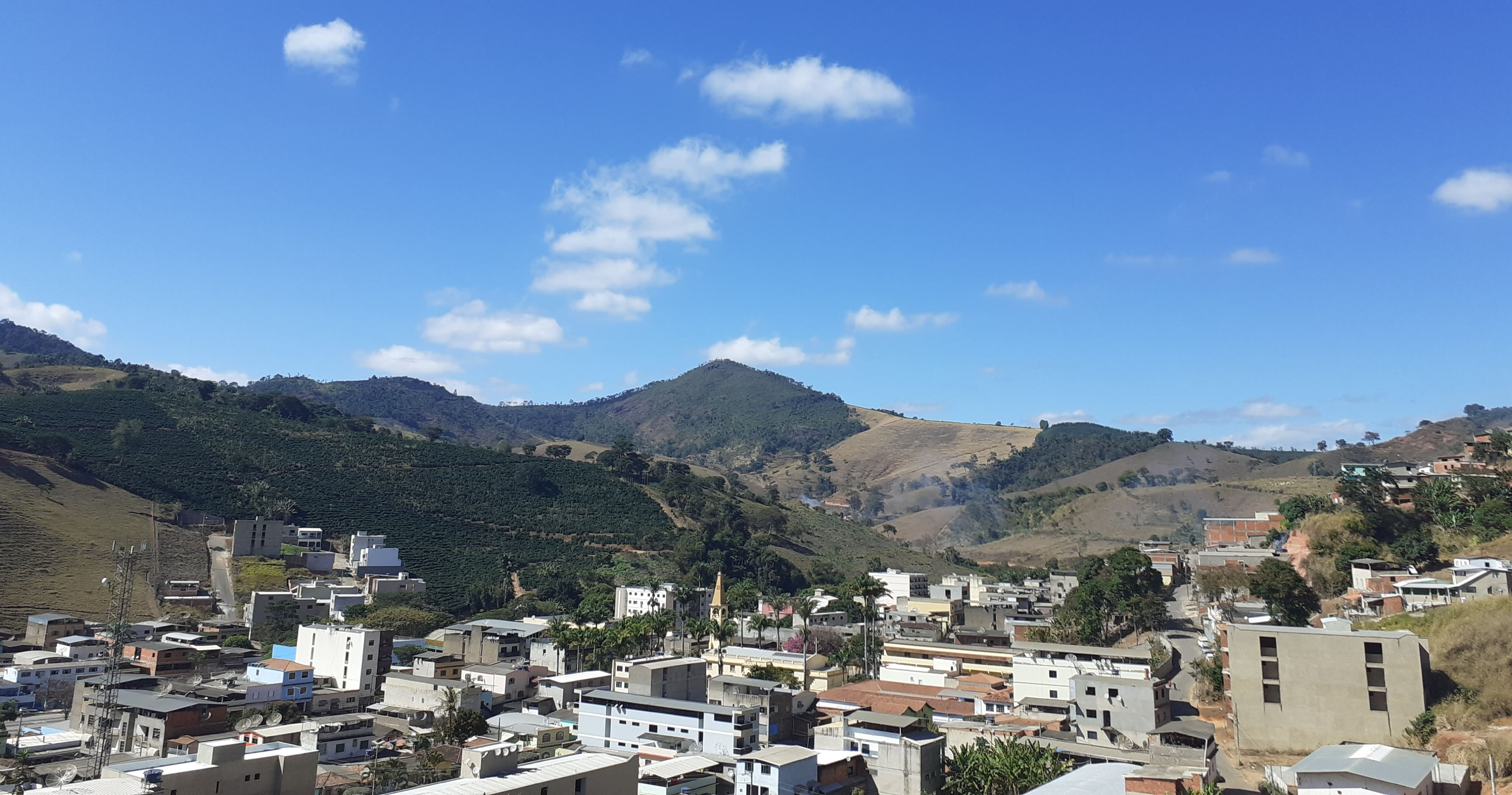
- View of Santa Rita de Minas

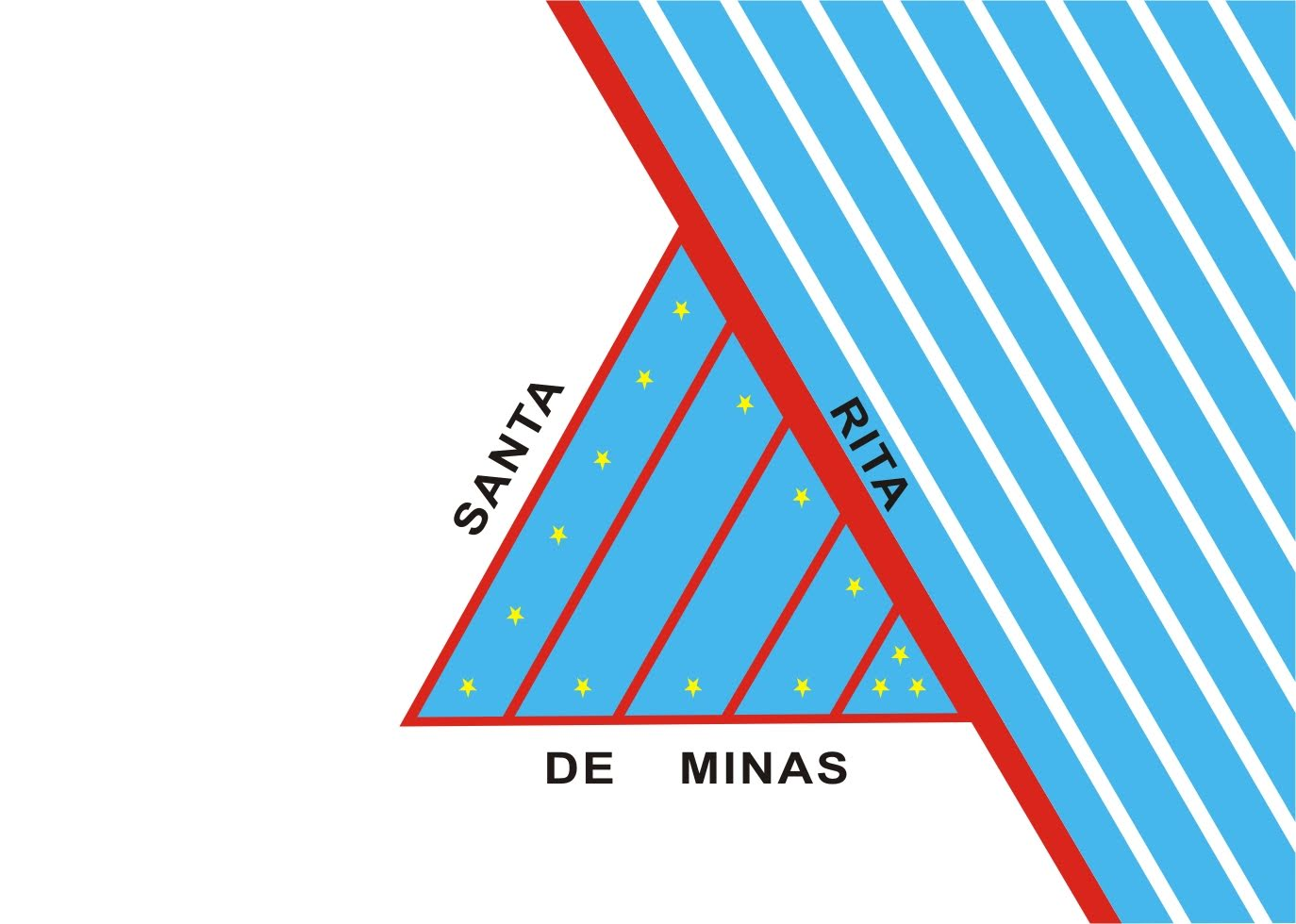
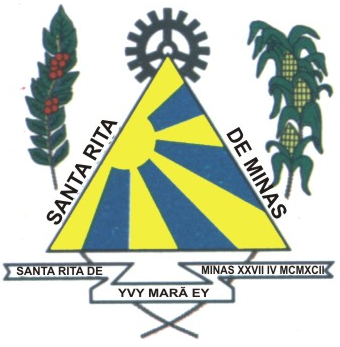
- Flag Coat of arms

- Location in Brazil
- Coordinates: 19°52′30″S 42°7′55″W
- Country: Brazil
- Region: Southeast
- State: Minas Gerais
- Mesoregion: Vale do Rio Doce

Population (2020)
  - Total: 7,268
- Time zone: UTC−3 (BRT)

Santa Rita de Minas is a municipality in the state of Minas Gerais in the Southeast region of Brazil.

== See also ==
- List of municipalities in Minas Gerais
