= William Simonton =

American politician

William Simonton (February 12, 1788 – May 17, 1846) was a Whig member of the U.S. House of Representatives from Pennsylvania.

William Simonton was born in West Hanover Township, Pennsylvania, near Harrisburg, Pennsylvania, to Dr. William Simonton and Jane Wiggins. He graduated from the medical department of the University of Pennsylvania at Philadelphia in 1810 and practiced his profession while residing on his farm near Hummelstown, Pennsylvania. Simonton was elected auditor of Dauphin County, Pennsylvania, in 1823 and served three years. He was one of the original supporters of the free-school system established by the act of 1834.

Simonton was elected as a Whig to the Twenty-sixth and Twenty-seventh Congresses. He died in South Hanover Township, Pennsylvania, in 1846. Interment in the Old Hanover Cemetery, north of Shellsville, Pennsylvania.

One of his sons, Ashbel Green Simonton, was a Presbyterian minister and the first missionary to settle a Protestant Church in Brazil.

== Sources ==
- United States Congress. "William Simonton (id: S000427)". Biographical Directory of the United States Congress.
- The Political Graveyard

U.S. House of Representatives
Preceded by Luther Reily	Member of the U.S. House of Representatives from Pennsylvania's 10th congressional district 1839–1843	Succeeded by Richard Brodhead
