= George Michael Weiss =

George Michael Weiss [last name also spelled Weitzius] (1697 in the Rhine Palatinate, Germany – 1762 near Philadelphia) was a Dutch Reformed clergyman who worked in New York and Pennsylvania.

== Biography ==
He was ordained to the ministry at Heidelberg in 1725, and two years afterward emigrated to the United States with 400 settlers. He went with them to Pennsylvania, organized a Reformed Dutch church at Skippack, returned to Holland, and collected funds for its support. He became pastor of German congregations in Schoharie and Dutchess Counties, New York, in 1731, and labored there fourteen years, but was compelled to flee to Pennsylvania to escape the attacks of the Native Americans. From about 1746 until his death he preached in Old Goshenhoppen and Great Swamp, Pennsylvania.

== Works ==
- An Account and Instruction relating to the Colony and Church of Pennsylvania, made up by the Deputies of the Synod of South Holland (Amsterdam, 1730)
- a pamphlet concerning his arrangements with the classis of Amsterdam to care for the Germans in Pennsylvania (1731)
- Account of the Indians' (1743)
