= United Presbyterian Church of Brazil =

The United Presbyterian Church in Brazil was organized on September 10, 1978 as the National Federation of Presbyterian Churches, it separated from the Presbyterian Church of Brazil. In 1983, the church adopted the current name. Its headquarters is in Victoria (Espírito Santo, ES). The church is a supporter of women in the ministry.

== Structure ==
In January 2011, the church had 3,466 members in 48 churches, distributed in eight presbyteries:

- Presbytery in Victoria
- Presbytery in St.Paul
- Presbytery North Central ES
- New River Presbytery
- Presbytery of Jundiai
- Presbytery of the Savior
- Presbytery of Erasmo Baga
- Presbytery of the City of Rio de Janeiro

== Theology ==
Member of the World Communion of Reformed Churches, Latin American Council of Churches, Alliance of Presbyterian and Reformed Churches in Latin America and the national Council of Christian Churches in Brazil.
