= Ashbel Green Simonton =

American missionary

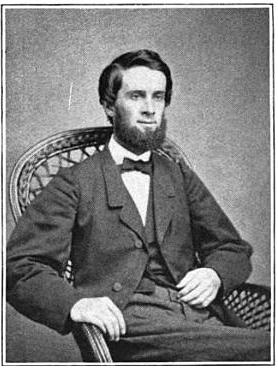
- Reverend Ashbel Green Simonton
- Born: January 20, 1833; West Hanover Township, Pennsylvania, U.S.
- Died: December 9, 1867 (aged 34); São Paulo, Brazil
- Burial place: Protestant Cemetery (São Paulo, Brazil)
- Occupations: Presbyterian minister and missionary
- Parents: William Simonton (father); Martha Davis Snodgrass (mother)

Ashbel Green Simonton (January 20, 1833 – December 9, 1867) was an American Presbyterian minister, and the first missionary to settle a Protestant church denomination in Brazil, Igreja Presbiteriana do Brasil, which translates as Presbyterian Church of Brazil, after Robert Reid Kalley planted the congregational Igreja evangélica fluminense.

== Early life and education ==
Simonton was born in present-day West Hanover Township, Pennsylvania, and spent his childhood on the family's estate, named Antigua. His parents were the doctor and politician William Simonton, who was elected twice to Congress, and Mrs. Martha Davis Snodgrass (1791–1862), daughter of James Snodgrass, a Presbyterian minister, who was the pastor of the local church.

Ashbel was named after Ashbel Green, president of New Jersey College. He was one among nine brothers and sisters. The boys, William, John, James, Thomas and Ashbel, called themselves the "quinque fratres" (five brothers). One of his brothers, James Snodgrass Simonton, four years older than Ashbel, was also a missionary to Brazil, spending three years as a teacher in the city of Vassouras, in the state of Rio de Janeiro. One of his four sisters, Elizabeth Wiggins Simonton (1822–1879), also called Lille, married the Presbyterian minister and missionary Alexander Latimer Blackford, a colleague of Simonton in Brazil and the co-founder of the Igreja Presbiteriana do Brasil.

In 1846, the family moved to Harrisburg, Pennsylvania, where Simonton finished high school. He graduated from New Jersey College, which is now Princeton University.

== Career ==
In 1852, he spent about a year and a half in Mississippi, working as a teacher for young boys. Disappointed with the lack of attention by the local authorities for teaching, Simonton went back to Pennsylvania and tried to become a lawyer, although by that time many people would advise him to become a minister, something to which his mother had consecrated him at his birth.

In 1855, he had a deep religious experience during a revival and went to the Princeton Seminary. In his first term, he heard in the seminary's chapel a sermon by Charles Hodge, one of his teachers, which moved him to the missionary work in foreign lands. He was ordained in 1859, and arrived in Brazil on August 12 of that year.

=== Ministry ===
On January 12, 1862, soon after organizing the Presbyterian church in Brazil, Simonton vacationed in the United States, where he married Helen Murdoch, in Baltimore. They returned to Brazil in July 1863. The following year, in 1864, they became parents to Helen Murdoch Simonton, Simonton’s only daughter.

Besides the Presbyterian Church, Simonton created a newspaper, Imprensa Evangélica (1864), along with a presbytery (1865) and a seminary (1867).

== Death ==
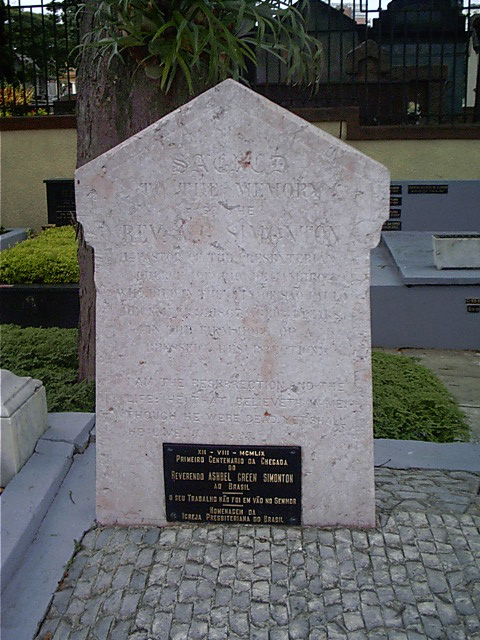
Simonton's tombstone at Protestant Cemetery in São Paulo

In 1867, feeling ill, Simonton went to São Paulo, where his sister and brother-in-law were raising his daughter. Simonton died of yellow fever on December 9, 1867.

== Sources ==
- Shaull, M. Richard (1963). Kerr, Hugh T. (ed.) "Ashbel Green Simonton: A Calvinist in Brazil". Sons of the Prophets: Leaders in Protestantism from Princeton Seminary. Princeton University Press (also archive.org).
