= Church union =

Merger of Christian denominations

Church union is the name given to a merger of two or more Christian denominations. Such unions may take on many forms, including a united church and a federation.

== United churches ==
A united church is the result of a merger of churches of various denominations. One of the first of these occurred in 1817, when Lutheran and Reformed churches in Prussia merged into the Prussian Union.

The nineteenth century saw a number of unions between churches of the same tradition. For example, the United Secession Church in Scotland was formed in 1820 by a union of various churches which had seceded from the established Church of Scotland. All these were Presbyterian in both doctrine and practice.

In the twentieth century many churches merged as a result of the Ecumenical movement. One of the earliest such unions was in 1925, and formed the United Church of Canada. Other examples include like-minded bodies with a common theological history such as the United Methodist Church - a merger of the Evangelical United Brethren Church and the Methodist Church in the United States.

== Federation ==
A federation is a less centralized union.

One example includes the Presbyterian Churches of New South Wales, Victoria, Queensland, South Australia, Tasmania and Western Australia, which joined together to form the Presbyterian Church of Australia on 24 July 1901. The structure was similar to the Federation which formed the Commonwealth of Australia on 1 January that year. In his inaugural moderatorial address, John Meiklejohn made it clear that the ecclesiastical union consciously reflected the political union of the Australian colonies: "We have, by forming this Assembly, formed a Court whose jurisdiction is, as regards territory, equal to, and coterminous with that of the Federal Parliament, and like it, is representative in its character."

This union linked churches of the same denomination in different locations into one body without forming a monolithic national church. The individual state churches also kept their individual identities, rights, and privileges.

== The Uniates and the Edinoverie ==
The term "union" (e.g., the Union of Brest of 1596) is also used for the arrangement when a group of Orthodox Christians enters communion with the Catholic Church's Pope of Rome, while wishing to maintain their Eastern rites. Such groups are known generically as Eastern Catholic Churches. Their adherents are occasionally referred to as uniates.

In a somewhat parallel way, but on a much smaller scale, Russian Orthodox Church has integrated certain Old Believer communities, allowing them to keep their rites while recognizing the authority of the national church. This arrangement is known as Edinoverie.

== See also ==
- Continuing church
- Ecclesiastical separatism
- Ecumenism
