= Fundamentalist Presbyterian Church in Brazil =

Igreja Presbiteriana Fundamentalista do Brasil
- Orientation: Calvinist
- Polity: Presbyterian
- Founder: Israel Furtado Gueiros
- Origin: 1996; Recife
- Separated from: Presbyterian Church of Brazil
- Members: 1.800-2.000
- Places of worship: 27

The Fundamentalist Presbyterian Church in Brazil was founded in 1956 in northeastern part of Brazil under the leadership of Rev. Dr. Israel Gueiros. A schism occurred in the Presbyterian Church of Brazil, because of the inspiration of the Bible and other doctrinal issues. Today the church has 5 presbytery and the denomination are about to form a Synod. Has its own journal and started evangelical projects. The church has 1,800–2,000 members and 27 congregations.

The church has connections with other fundamentalist churches and Carl McIntire. The church adhere to the Apostle Creed and Westminster Confession of Faith.

The current moderator is José Pereira de Barros.
