= Independent Presbyterian Church of Brazil =

- Classification: Protestant
- Orientation: Calvinist; Mainline; Charismatic and Evangelical minorities
- Polity: Presbyterian
- Associations: World Communion of Reformed Churches,
- Region: Brazil
- Founder: Rev. Eduardo Carlos Pereira
- Origin: July 31st, 1903; São Paulo
- Separated from: Presbyterian Church of Brazil
- Separations: Conservative Presbyterian Church in Brazil; Renewed Presbyterian Church in Brazil
- Congregations: 546 (2012)
- Members: 85,108 (2012)

The Independent Presbyterian Church of Brazil (in Portuguese: Igreja Presbiteriana Independente do Brasil, IPIB) is a Mainline Protestant Christian denomination in Brazil. Part of the Reformed family of Protestantism, it is the second oldest Presbyterian denomination in the country, had an estimated 74.224 members, 693 ordained ministers and 510 churches in 2009. In 2012 the church had more than 85,000 members and 546 congregations. It was founded by Brazilian minister Rev. Eduardo Carlos Pereira and a group of six other ministers and their churches, who split from the Presbyterian Church of Brazil over a number of political and ecclesiastical controversies.

== History ==
The causes which led to the creation of the Independent Presbyterian Church go back to the final years of the 19th century. The number of Brazilian ministers in activity in the Presbyterian Church of Brazil was rising since the foundation of the Seminary, and these native ministers began resenting the influence of the missionaries from both American churches, which was still largely felt even after the Brazilian Synod was constituted in 1888.

In 1893, Rev. Eduardo Carlos Pereira, pastor of the First Presbyterian Church of São Paulo, founded a newspaper, O Estandarte, in which he advocated his views for a truly national, independent church. He met opposition in Rev. Álvaro Reis, pastor of the Presbyterian Church of Rio de Janeiro, who, in 1899, founded O Puritano, where he often debated Pereira's more exalted views.

In March 1902, Pereira published a five-point Platform, adapted from a speech he delivered in the Seminary in 1900, demanding:

1. The spiritual independence and absolute sovereignty of the Presbyterian Church of Brazil;
2. The withdrawal of all foreign missionaries from Brazilian presbyteries;
3. An official declaration of incompatibility between Freemasonry and the Gospel of the Lord Jesus Christ;
4. The conversion of all National Missions in Presbyterial Missions or the granting of autonomy to the presbyteries for the evangelisation of their territories;
5. Systematised education of the children of the Church, by the Church and for the Church.

The latter point being a direct reaction to the missionaries' policy of indirect evangelisation of children through Mackenzie College (currently, Mackenzie Presbyterian University) and other non-confessional schools, which was cause for great attrition between Pereira and the American schoolmasters, Horace M. Lane and William A. Waddell.

In July 1903, during the Synod's Ordinary Meeting, when Pereira's overture on Freemasonry was defeated for the second time, and after a heated debate, he, along with another six ministers and eleven ruling elders, left the building and went on foot to the First Church, where a service was being held. Tradition has it that, when his party arrived to the church, during a moment of intercessory prayer, one of them began singing Daniel W. Whittle's gospel song "Banner of the Cross" and was enthusiastically joined by colleagues and then by the entire congregation. The hymn was adopted as IPIB's official hymn.
