= Presbyterian Church of Brazil =

Evangelical Protestant Christian denomination in Brazil

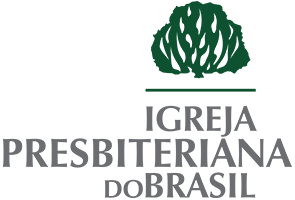
- Classification: Protestant
- Orientation: Presbyterian
- Scripture: Protestant Bible
- Theology: Evangelical; Reformed
- Polity: Presbyterian
- Moderator: Rev. Roberto Brasileiro; President of the Supreme Council
- Associations: World Reformed Fellowship
- Region: Brazil
- Founder: Rev. Ashbel Green Simonton
- Origin: August 12th, 1859; Rio de Janeiro
- Branched from: Presbyterian Church in the United States
- Separations: 1903: Independent Presbyterian Church of Brazil; 1956: Fundamentalist Presbyterian Church in Brazil; 1968: Renewed Presbyterian Church in Brazil; 1978: United Presbyterian Church of Brazil; 1993: Traditional Presbyterian Church in Brazil; 1995: Presbyterian Church of Grace; 1997: Revived Reformed Presbyterian Church of Brazil; 2000: Reformed Presbyterian Church of Brazil
- Congregations: 5,420 (2021)
- Members: 702,949 (2021)
- Ministers: 4,915 (2021)

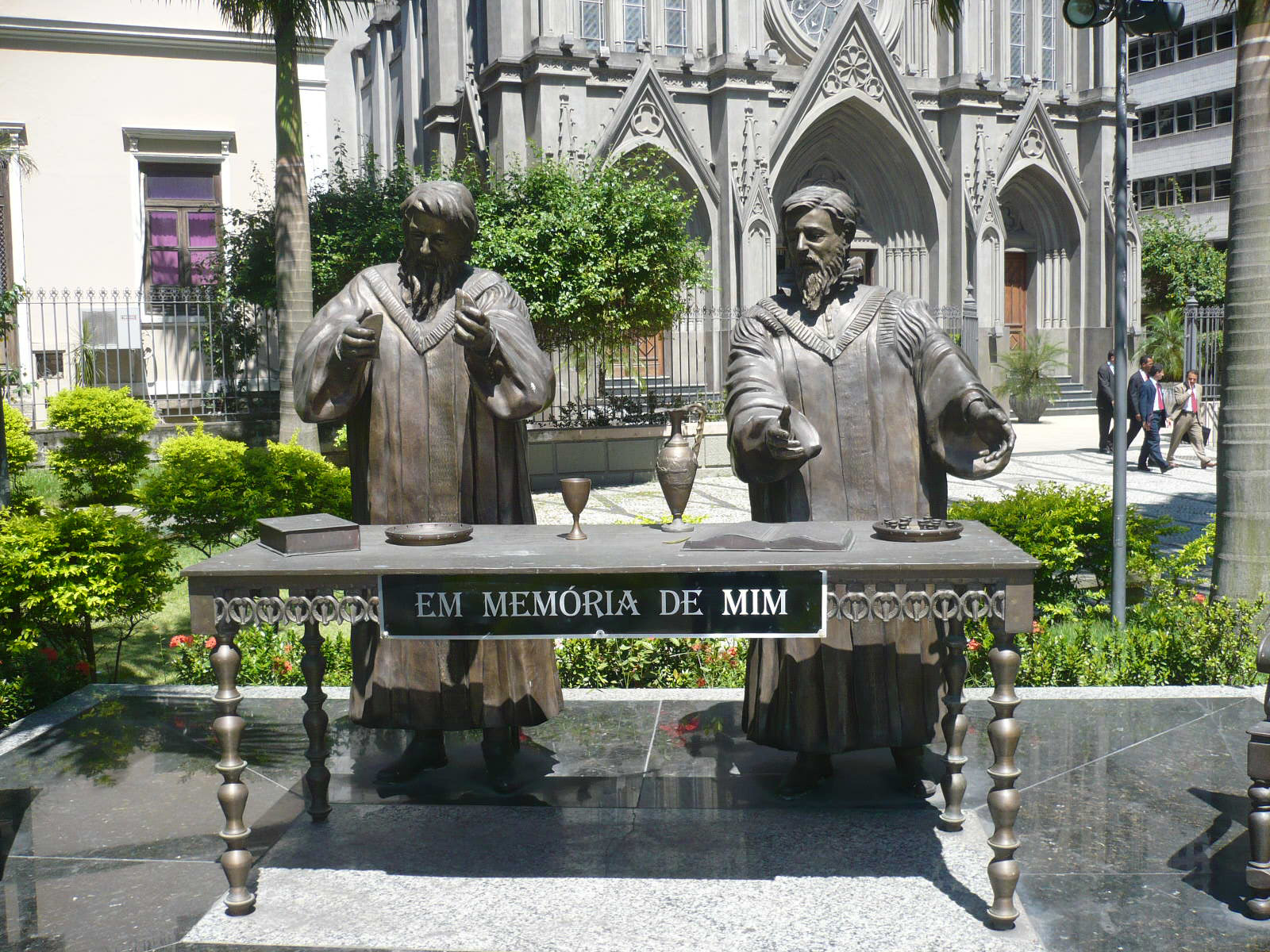
Sculpture in front of the Presbyterian Church of Rio de Janeiro representing the first Protestant eucharist realized in Brazil.

The Presbyterian Church of Brazil (Portuguese: Igreja Presbiteriana do Brasil, or IPB, PCB in English) is an Evangelical Protestant Christian denomination in Brazil. It is the largest Presbyterian denomination in the country, having an estimated 702,949 members, 4,915 ordained ministers and 5,420 churches and parishes. It is also the only Presbyterian denomination in Brazil present in all 26 States and the Federal District.

The Church was founded by the American missionary Rev. Ashbel Green Simonton, who also oversaw the formal organization of the first congregation (Presbyterian Church of Rio de Janeiro) and the first Presbytery (Presbytery of Rio de Janeiro).

The original Church in Rio de Janeiro was formally organized in January 1863. The Church then left the jurisdiction of the American church 1888, when the Synod was formed. The denomination considers the date of Simonton's arrival in Brazil, 12 August, 1859, as its foundation date.

== History ==
=== The beginnings and first decades ===
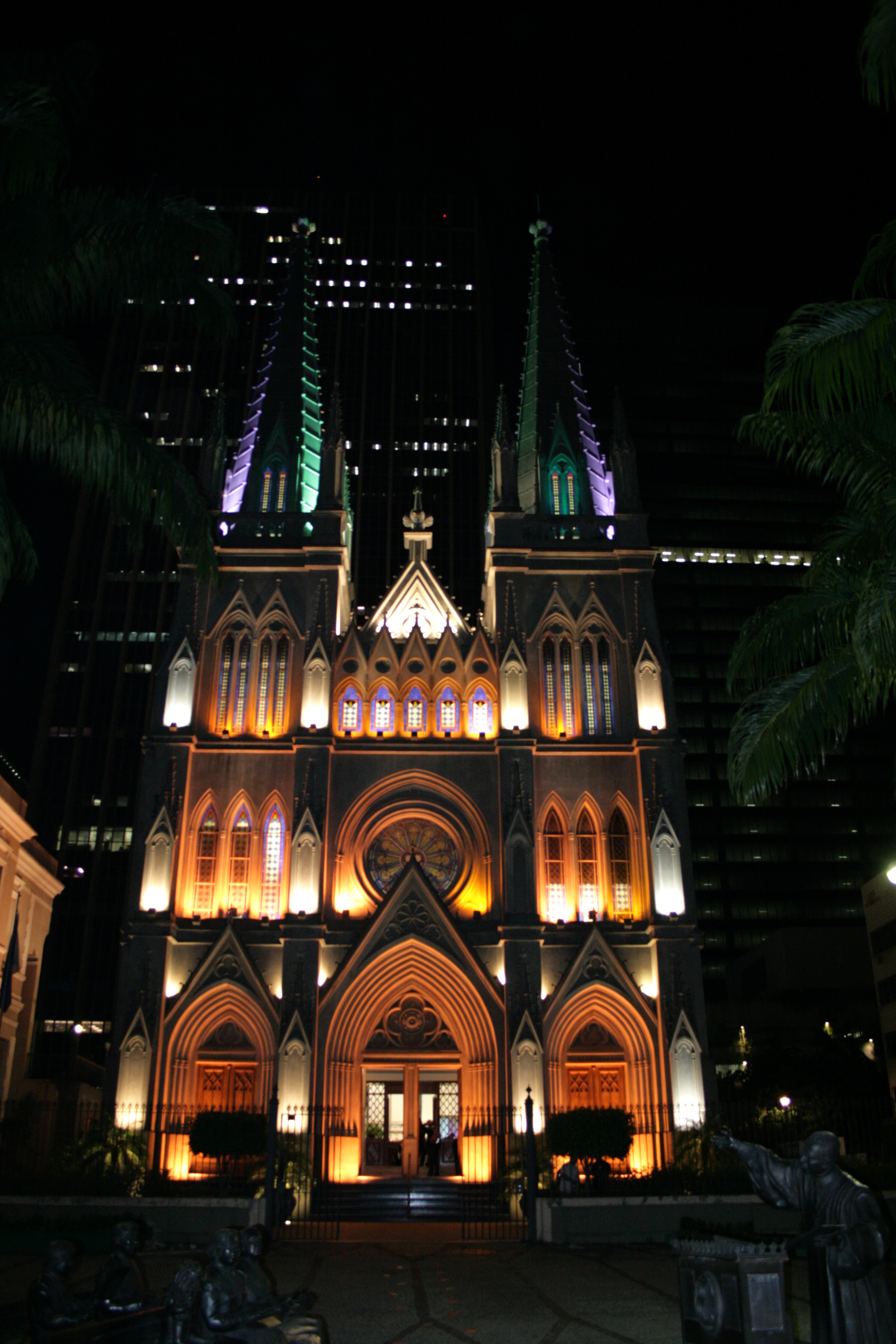
Presbyterian Cathedral of Rio de Janeiro.

Rev. Ashbel Green Simonton (1833–1867), considered the founder of the Church, was born in West Hanover, Pennsylvania. He studied in New Jersey intending to become a professor or a lawyer. A religious revival in 1855, encouraged him to enter the Princeton Theological Seminary. While there, a sermon preached by Professor Charles Hodge made him consider becoming a missionary, and three years later he volunteered to the Presbyterian Church in the United States' (PCUS) Missions Board, naming Brazil as his preferred destination. Two months after being ordained, he embarked to Brazil, where he arrived on August 12, 1859, at the age of 26.

In January 1862, the first converts professed their faith and the Presbyterian Church of Rio de Janeiro was formally organized. Simonton founded the first Protestant Brazilian newspaper (Imprensa Evangélica, 1864) and oversaw the creation of the first Presbytery (Presbytery of Rio de Janeiro, 1865) and Seminary (1867). Simonton died of yellow fever at age 34, in 1867.

Other missionaries assisted Simonton in the early years of the Brazilian mission:

- Rev. Alexander Latimer Blackford (1829 Martins Ferry OH - May 1890, Atlanta), who oversaw the creation of the churches in São Paulo and Brotas, and was the first president of the Presbytery of Rio de Janeiro.
- Rev. Francis J. C. Schneider, who preached among German immigrants in Rio Claro, taught at the Rio de Janeiro Seminary, and was a missionary in Bahia.

Other churches created in the denomination's first few decades were in Lorena, Borda da Mata, Pouso Alegre and Sorocaba, most of these credited to Rev. José Manoel da Conceição (1822–1873), a former Roman Catholic priest and the first Brazilian to be ordained a Protestant minister (1865).

In 1869 Revs. George Nash Morton and Edward Lane preached in Campinas, where many American expatriates had immigrated to during the American Civil War. The church in Campinas was founded in 1870. PCUS missionaries also preached in the Mogiana region, western Minas Gerais, the Triângulo Mineiro and southern Goiás.

The church of Rio de Janeiro consecrated its first sanctuary in 1874. In the same year, new congregations were also established in the States of São Paulo, Paraná and Rio Grande do Sul. In the city of São Paulo, the American School was founded.

In 1865 the Presbytery of Rio de Janeiro was created with 39 pastors.

=== Synod ===
In September 1888, the Synod of the Presbyterian Church of Brazil was formally created, and thus the Church became autonomous from the American church. The Synod comprised three presbyteries (Rio de Janeiro, Campinas-Oeste de Minas and Pernambuco), 20 missionaries, 12 native ministers and about 60 churches. Rev. A. L. Blackford was its first Moderator. The Synod also created the Presbyterian Seminary, and elected its first two professors.

=== Schisms ===
In March 1902, Rev. Eduardo C. Pereira created a platform outlining his differences with the church on missionary, educational and Masonic matters. On 31 July, 1903, Pereira and his colleagues withdrew from the Synod and founded the Independent Presbyterian Church of Brazil.

In 1956 the Fundamentalist Presbyterian Church was formed under the influence of Karl McIntosh and the Bible Presbyterian Church USA, which has over 20 congregations and 1800 members.

The United Presbyterian Church in Brazil was formed in 1978, has 48 churches and 3,466 members in 8 presbyteries. It is a member church of the World Communion of Reformed Churches.

== Worship ==
General rules regarding the church's public worship practices are laid in the Principles of Liturgy (PL), which stand as a Directory of Worship. Articles 7 and 8 of the PL read:

Article 7. The Service of Public Worship is a religious act, through which the people of God worships their Lord, comes into communion with Him, making confession of sins and seeking, through the mediation of Jesus Christ, forgiveness, sanctification of life and spiritual growth. It is an appropriate occasion for the proclamation of the redeeming message of Christ's Gospel and the indoctrination and fellowship of the saints.
Article 8. The Service of Public Worship is ordinarily [composed] of the reading of the Word of God, preaching, sacred singing, prayer and offerings. The ministration of the Sacraments, when performed during the Service, is part of it.

The Constitution of the Church states that overseeing the liturgy and worship practices of the local congregation is the responsibility and private prerogative of the Minister of Word and Sacraments, who is free to arrange the elements of the service as he deems more edifying to the congregation, so long as worship practices don't come into conflict with the church's doctrinal standards.

In an essay published in 2006, Rev. Christian S. Bittencourt, former Professor of Theology of Worship at the Rio de Janeiro Presbyterian Theological Seminary, stated that there are at least four distinct liturgical groups in Brazilian Presbyterianism: Old-school Conservatives, Evangelical Charismatics, Ultra-puritans and Neo-orthodox Conservatives.

- Old-school conservatives, the most common tendency, tend to favour a service order freely based in Isaiah, chapter 6: ascription of praise Confession of sins, adoration, Offertory, reading and preaching of Scripture, ministration of the Sacraments of Baptism and the Lord's Supper and Benediction. Pertinent traditional hymns and/or modern praise choruses may be inserted before, during or after each part of the service, and the Adoration section is often replaced by a selection of praise and worship choruses led by a modern music band. Old-school conservatives usually eschew the use of responsive liturgies, set forms of prayer, creeds, the Church Year and lectionaries (save for the commemoration of Christmas and Easter) and distinctive dress for ministers and church officials, save for rare ministers who choose to wear the Geneva robe, without stoles.
- Evangelical Charismatics, fastest growing group, favor a contemporary, free-form liturgy. Structurally, it is composed of three or four parts: praise and worship songs, reading and preaching of Scripture, the Sacraments of Baptism and the Lord's Supper and Benediction. Most other acts of worship are more or less organically included in the praise and worship time, led by the church's minister or the leading vocalist of the praise band. A second selection of praise and worship songs may be included after the sermon, especially if an altar call is to take place or if the Sacraments are to be ministered. Evangelical Charismatics may or may not adopt, along with the order of service, Pentecostal practices such as communal, simultaneous prayer in loud voice and glossolalia.
- Neo-orthodox Conservatives are a group consisting mostly of young ministers of a more academical background, usually in small congregations, who conduct experiments into bringing the IPB toward a more mainline position. They seek to establish a greater catholicity in the Presbyterian worship practice, recovering the use of responsive liturgies, litanies, set forms of intercession and prayer, the observance of the Church Year and use of the Revised Common Lectionary. Their ministers are usually more inclined to wear distinctive garb, such as clerical shirts, Geneva robes or even albs, with stoles. Even though they are fond of traditional hymnody, they usually also employ praise choruses within the context of the service order. Even though the practical implementation of such a project usually faces some resistance and requires a certain degree of compromise, their ideal liturgy is something close to PC (U.S.A.)'s The Service for the Lord's Day.
- Puritans, the smallest group within the IPB, choose to lead their worship according to the Westminster Directory of Public Worship, instead of the Principles of Liturgy. The order of worship is usually close to the one practiced by Old-school Conservatives, save for three differences: the only music employed in public worship are metric Psalms sung congregationally, a capella; women are not allowed to speak, teach or pray in public services nor Sunday School, except if there be no men present; and no feast of the Church Year is ever observed, not even Christmas and Easter.

The IPB has no official liturgy akin to PCUSA's Book of Common Worship. For weddings and funerals, Ministers usually employ one of three resources:

1. Manual do Culto ("Worship Handbook"), a non-official compilation of orders of service done by Rev. Modesto Carvalhosa de Perestrello to serve as a guide to lay leaders in the early 20th century, published by Cultura Cristã, IPB's publishing branch.
2. Manual Litúrgico ("Liturgical Handbook"), an expansion of Manual do Culto with alternate forms and biblical readings.
3. The Independent Presbyterian Church's Manual do Culto, which is an abbreviated translation of PC (USA)'s 1993 Book of Common Worship.

== Structure ==
The congregations are governed by ruling elders, teaching elders and deacons. The next level is the presbytery where delegates from local churches can discuss current issues. Synod is the next organisation form, the Presbyterian Church in Brazil has more than 64 synods.

The highest court is the General Assembly. The church is represented out of court by the President of the Supreme Council which elected directly in and anonymous vote. The current President of the Supreme Council is Rev. Roberto Brasileiro Silva.

== Church planting ==
| Year | Churches | Members |
|---|---|---|
| 1906 | 77 | 6,500 |
| 1910 | 150 | 10,000 |
| 1957 | 489 | 161.391 |
| 2004 | 4,241 | 473,598 |
| 2005 | 3,912 | 501,259 |
| 2006 | 4,033 | 516,762 |
| 2007 | 4,078 | 522,679 |
| 2008 | 4.237 | 542,938 |
| 2009 | 4,346 | 556,962 |
| 2010 | 4,488 | 575,124 |
| 2011 | 4,581 | 587,105 |
| 2012 | 4,674 | 599,087 |
| 2013 | 4,770 | 611,313 |
| 2014 | 4,867 | 623,789 |
| 2015 | 4,967 | 636,520 |
| 2016 | 5,068 | 649,510 |

The church reported it was supporting newly planted congregations at the rate of one per week.

== Interchurch relationships ==
Presbyterian church in Brazil is a member church of the World Reformed Fellowship.

The PCB does not belong to the World Communion of Reformed Churches.

The PCB suspended its membership of the World Alliance of Reformed Churches in 1973, but in 1998 it reactivated its membership. In 2006 the Presbyterian Church in Brazil disaffiliated from the World Alliance of Reformed Churches due to theological differences.

The church has fraternal relations with 17 Presbyterian Churches in the United States, South America, Africa, Europe and Asia.

== Theology ==
The Presbyterian Church in Brazil is a socially and theologically conservative denomination. The church teaches that life begins at conception, and abortion is a sin. According to the Scriptures, homosexual lifestyle is sinful and marriage is a covenant between one man and one woman. Officers, teaching elders, ruling elders and deacons in the denominations are men only. The Presbyterian Church in Brazil severed all ties with first the United Presbyterian Church in the USA, and later the Southern Presbyterian Church.

== Theological Seminaries ==
- Presbyterian Theological Seminary in Brasilia
- Presbyterian Theological Seminary in the South - Campinas
- Rev. Jose Manoel da Conceicao Presbyterian Theological Seminary in São Paulo
- Rev. Ashbel Green Simonton Presbyterian Theological Seminary in Rio de Janeiro
- Presbyterian Theological Seminary in the North - Recife
- Presbyterian theological Seminary in the Northeast - Teresina
- Presbyterian Theological Seminary in Central Brazil - Goiania
- Extension of Presbyterian Theological Seminary in Central Brazil in Ji-Parana
- Rev. Danoel Nicodemos Eller Presbyterian Seminary - Belo Horizonte
- Centro Presbiteriano de Pós-graduação Andrew Jumper (Andrew Jumper Post Graduate Center) - São Paulo

The Rev. Jose Manuel da Conceicao Theological Seminary was founded in 1980, it was an extension of the Presbyterian Seminary in the South and named after Rev. Jose Manoel da Conceicao the first Brazilian Protestant pastor ordained by the presbyterian church. The Seminary recognise the Westminster Confession of Faith, Shorter and Larger Catechism.

== Missions ==
- JMN - Junta de Missões Nacionais (Board of National Missions) - founded in 1940 and has 185 missionaries to plant churches in Brazil.
- APMT - Agência Presbiteriana de Missões Transculturais - international missions with 30 missionaries abroad. Mission fields are in Bolivia, Spain, Italy, Portugal, Timor and Romania.
- Missão Evangélica Caiuá

== Education ==
- Mackenzie Presbyterian Institution
- Gammon Presbyterian Institution
- Eduardo Lane Bible Institution
- Augusto Arújo Bible Institution
