= Júlio Lancellotti =

Brazilian Catholic educator and priest

Monsignor Júlio Lancellotti
- Parish Priest of Saint Archangel Michael of Mooca
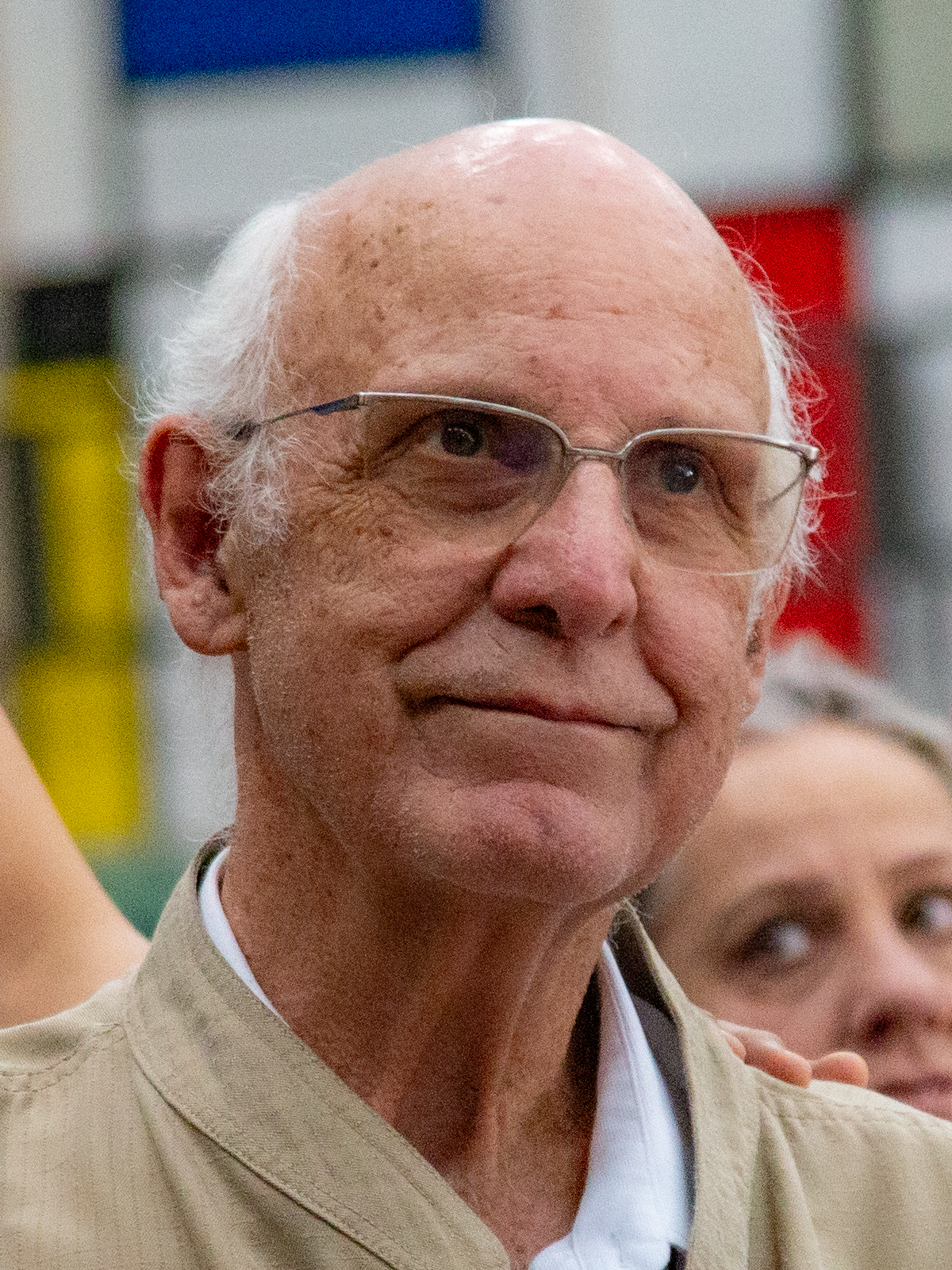
- Lancellotti in 2023
- Church: Roman Catholic Church
- Archdiocese: São Paulo

Orders
- Ordination: 20 April 1985 by Luciano Mendes de Almeida SJ
- Rank: Priest

Personal details
- Born: Júlio Renato Lancellotti; 27 December 1948 (age 77) São Paulo, Brazil
- Denomination: Roman Catholic

Júlio Renato Lancellotti (born December 27, 1948) is a Brazilian Catholic educator and priest at São Miguel Arcanjo Church in Mooca, São Paulo. He is also responsible for the Masses held at the Universidade São Judas Tadeu.

Lancelotti is known by his work with homeless and vulnerable people, children and adolescents, with the Pastoral do Povo da Rua (Pastoral of the People of the Street).

== Early life and education ==
Lancelotti was born in the city of São Paulo, in the district of Belém, the second of the three children of the couple Wilma Ferrari and Milton Fagundes Lancellotti. His father owned a grocery store and his mother worked as a secretary before becoming a homeowner.

Lancelotti started his formal education at Educandário Espírito Santo, maintained by the Missionary Servants of the Holy Ghost, in Tatuapé. At the age of twelve, he entered the seminary in Araraquara, but, uncomfortable with the severeness of the institution, he returned to São Paulo, where he finished high school at an Augustinian school.

Once again he decided to prepare for his religious career, he became a friar, but at the age of nineteen he left the monastical life again. In the meantime, he completed a nursing assistant course at Santa Casa de Misericórdia in Bragança Paulista and started to practice the profession. He then joined the Faculdades Oswaldo Cruz and completed the Pedagogy course. Then, he specialized in Educational Guidance at the Pontifical Catholic University of São Paulo, where he served as assistant professor to Professor Carlos Alberto Andreucci, in addition to teaching classes at the colleges Oswaldo Cruz, Castro Alves, Piratininga and at the Nossa Senhora Auxiliadora Institute, the last, geared towards preparing for teaching. Lancellotti also worked at the Social Service for Minors, which later became the Municipal Secretariat for Social Assistance and Development, and the Immigrant Support Center in Brás, giving classes to children with learning difficulties.

In 1980, he met Dom Luciano Pedro Mendes de Almeida, then auxiliary bishop of São Paulo, and they became very close. Together, they made all the foundations for the Pastoral do Menor of the Archdiocese of São Paulo. A year later, he began to study theology and was ordained a priest on April 20, 1985.

== Social work ==
Lancelotti works with juvenile offenders, inmates on assisted liberty, HIV / AIDS patients and low-income and homeless populations. He believes in the human being above all, "as the image and likeness of God" and considers that all citizens should have their rights respected.

On July 26, 1991, he founded "Casa Vida I" and, later, "Casa Vida II", homes to welcome children with HIV. As episcopal vicar of the People of the Street of the Archdiocese of São Paulo, he is in charge of several municipal projects to assist the needy population, such as the program "A Gente na Rua", formed by community health agents, former homeless people

== Banishment ==
In December 2025, Lancelotti was prohibited from sharing live masses publicly following a ruling by Cardinal Archbishop Dom Odilo Scherer of the Archdiocese of São Paulo. No reason for the ban was announced. In protest, Muslim sheikh Rodrigo Jalloul broadcast on social media Lancelotti's celebration of Christmas mass.

== Awards ==
The Human Rights Commission of the Brazilian Bar Association gave him the Franz de Castro Holzwarth Award in 2000 for his work against the systematic violation of the rights of children and adolescents.

In 2023, Lancelotti was awarded the Grand Cross of the Order of Merit from the Ministry of Justice.

In 2026, Lancelotti was awarded Doutor Honoris Causa by the Universidade Federal de Juiz de Fora.
