= Mooca (district of São Paulo) =

District of São Paulo, Brazil

Coordinates: 23°33′33″S 46°35′53″W

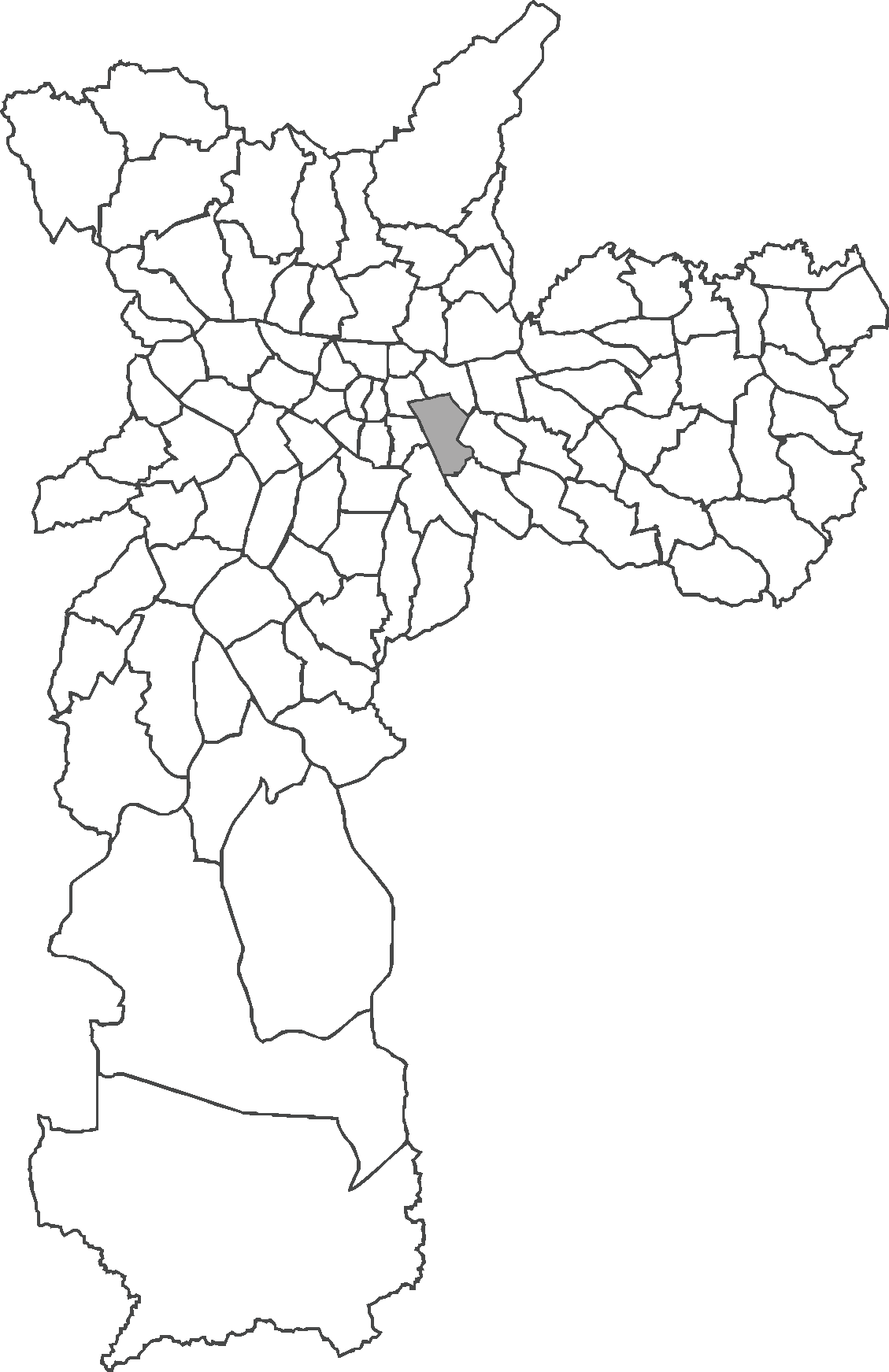
- Location in the city of São Paulo

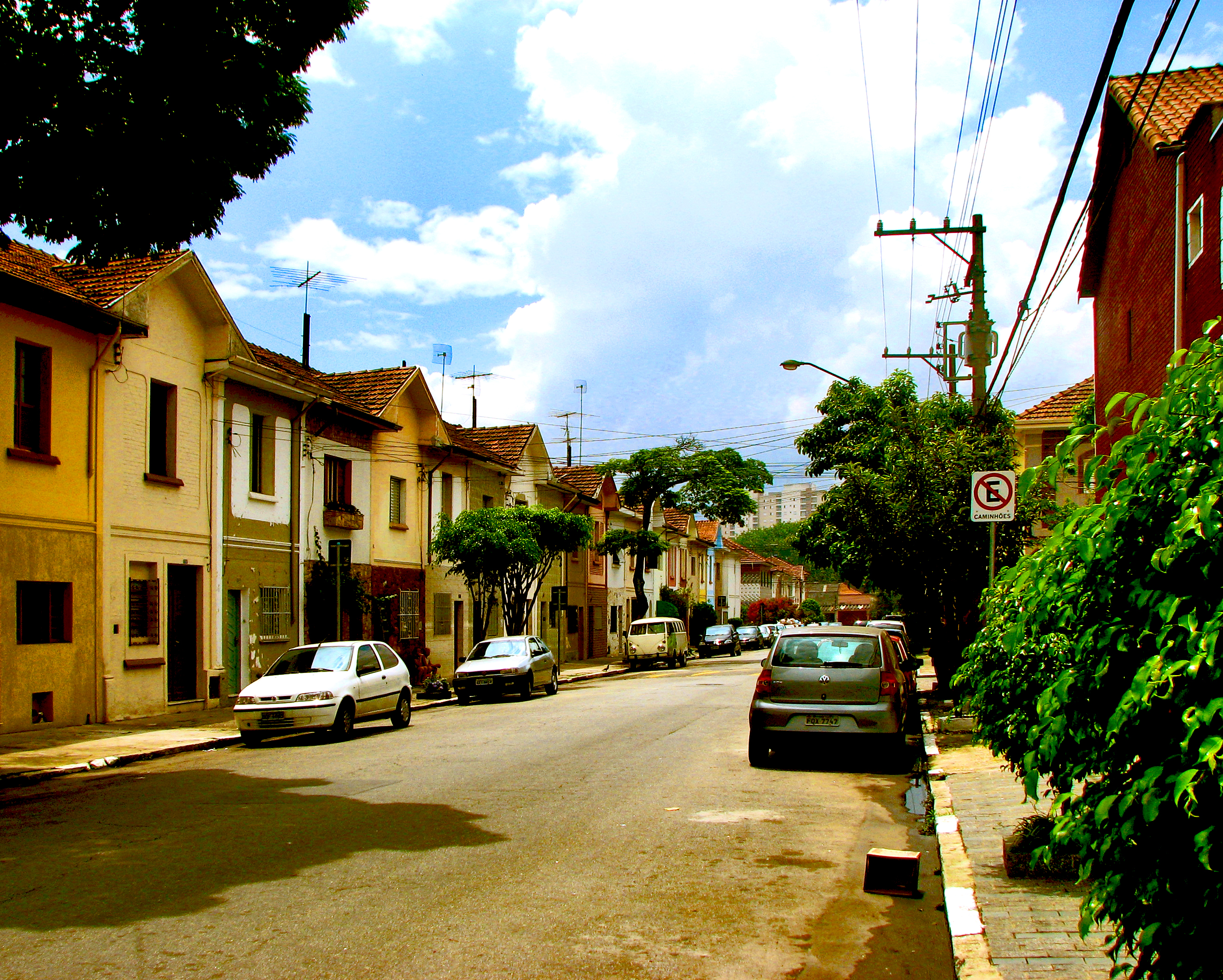
- A typical scene in Mooca: houses first built by immigrants in early 1900s are home to many still today.
- Country: Brazil
- State: São Paulo
- City: São Paulo

Government
  - Type: Subprefecture
  - Subprefect: Evandro Reis

Area
  - Total: 7.70 km^{2} (2.97 sq mi)

Population (2007)
  - Total: 75,724
  - Density: 9,834/km^{2} (25,470/sq mi)
- HDI: 0.909 –high
- Website: Subprefecture of Mooca

Mooca (Portuguese pronunciation: [ˈmɔka]) from tupi mo-oka, meaning to build houses (formerly written as "Moóca" prior to the Reforms of Portuguese orthography) is a district in the subprefecture of the same name in the city of São Paulo, Brazil. Mooca today is home to over 75,000 inhabitants, spread in its 7.7 square kilometres (3.0 sq mi). It is also considered one of the fastest-growing districts in the city, experiencing over the last years a vigorous momentum in the construction industry. Mooca has been the stage for many social movements, specially because of the presence of a strong influence of the industry interests in the political scene of São Paulo towards the end of the 19th century and the beginning of the 20th century. The composition of Mooca's economy today ranges from small businesses ran by locals, large industries, such as Lorenzetti and Groupe SEB, both important players locally and globally in the home appliances industry, and ultimately, large shopping malls offering a variety of services.

== History ==
The plains where Mooca lies were first settled by ancient Native American communities, such as the Tupi-Guaraní. São Paulo, known in the 16th century as São Paulo de Piratininga, arose from a Jesuit mission, founded in 1554 to convert indigenous populations, and its history is often confused with that of Mooca. In 1567, Portuguese Bandeirantes, or pathfinders, based in the village of São Paulo de Piratininga moved eastwards in their expeditions and that was probably when the region was first explored. Over the centuries, Mooca became an important rural area, containing a number of farms and cottages, dependent on the work of enslaved African-Brazilians. In the 1890s the area was divided into large plots that were put on sale in order to encourage Mooca's development. The district eventually became an important industrial area as the farms gave way to factories and industries towards the beginning of the 20th century. One of the first working-class sections is Vila Maria Zélia in the northern district of Belém. Many of the industrial installations eventually moved out of the city or closed down (even though a number of them are still active) and, much of the industrial zones became residential.

=== Italian settlement ===
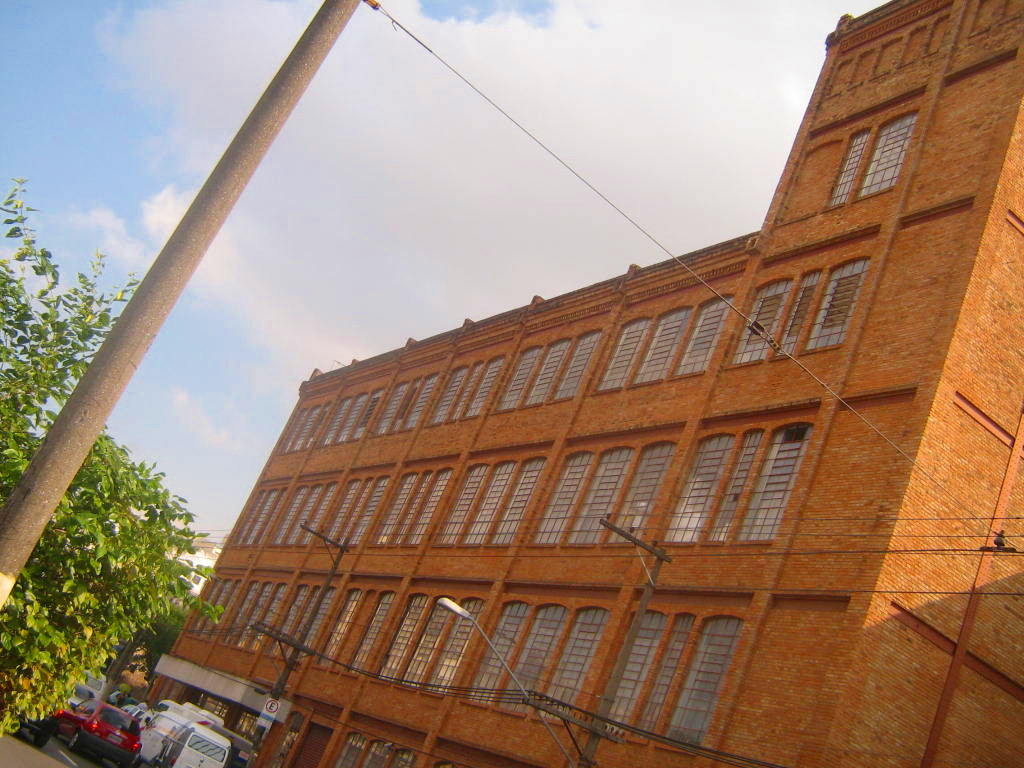
Cotonifício Crespi textile industry, sold to Extra Hipermercados supermarket chain.

In early 1900s, many industries settled in Mooca's quiet plains, an isolated area back then. Because labour at that time was in high demand, many immigrants from Italy, most of them coming from the city of Naples, fled to São Paulo to take up jobs at local industries. Indeed, much of Mooca's development was an outcome of the strong Italian immigrant influence. In 1910, two out of three inhabitants of Mooca were Italian.

The largest and most important collection on the history of immigration in Brazil, and specially the large flow of Italian and immigrants arriving in São Paulo state via the port of Santos, can be found at Museu da Imigração, a state-run museum that offers a very interesting database on immigrant records. Amácio Mazzaropi museum, named after a famous Brazilian comedian born to an Italian father, is a site of interest that preserves some of Mooca's immigration golden age memories. Another site of interest that is strongly related to Mooca's Italian origins is the local soccer team stadium, Juventus Stadium (cap. 2.000). A great number of the working-class families from Mooca found prosperity and as São Paulo was gradually changing from an industrial city into a business centre, many of those families started their own businesses (such as the Lorenzetti and Matarazzo families). Many of the more affluent families now reside in Tatuapé.

The local Italian community holds traditional religious celebrations and festivities all year round, being the most famous that of San Vito, Our Lady of Casaluce, San Gennaro (patron saint of Naples) and Our Lady Achiropita in the district of Bela Vista. These celebrations take place on the streets, where, aside from the true markets offering typical dishes, handicrafts and wine, stages for dance presentations and live traditional music are set up.

=== Cultural influences ===
A large number of Mooca's inhabitants have an Italian background although over the last century, Mooca embraced other communities from other parts of the world and regions in Brazil. Some representative communities that have contributed to Mooca's ethnic diversity are the Japanese, Portuguese, Spanish, Croatian, Lithuanian, Syrian, Lebanese and more recently the Bolivian and Peruvian, besides Brazilians migrants from the Northeast.

== Urban development ==
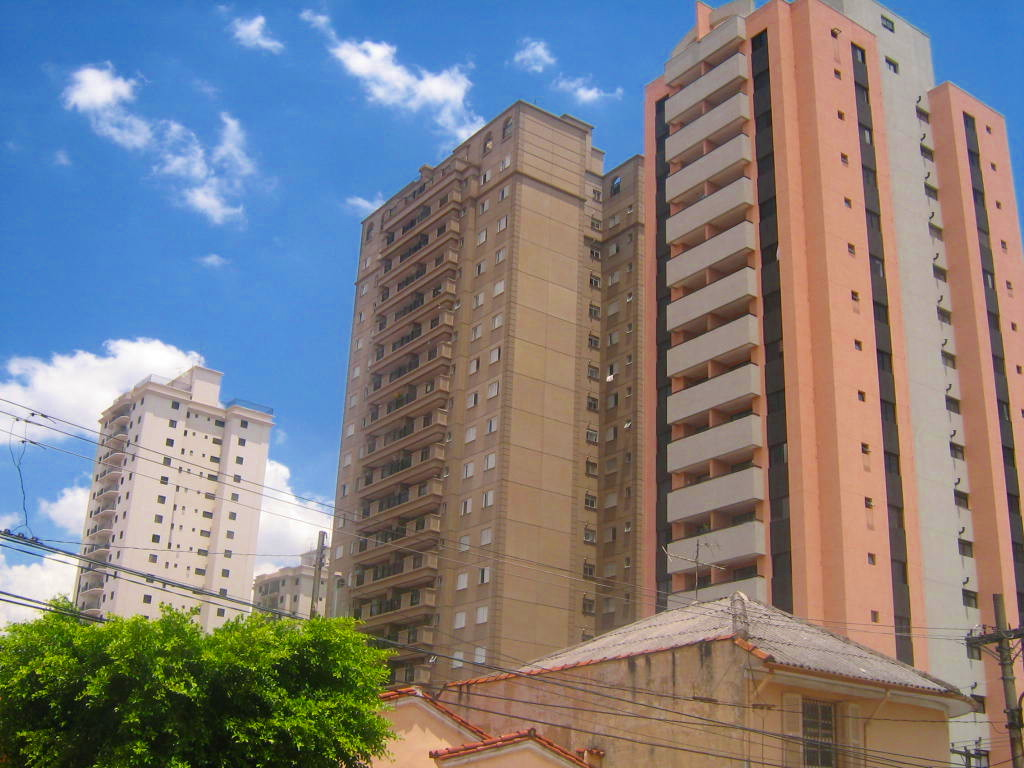
High rises, Alto da Mooca

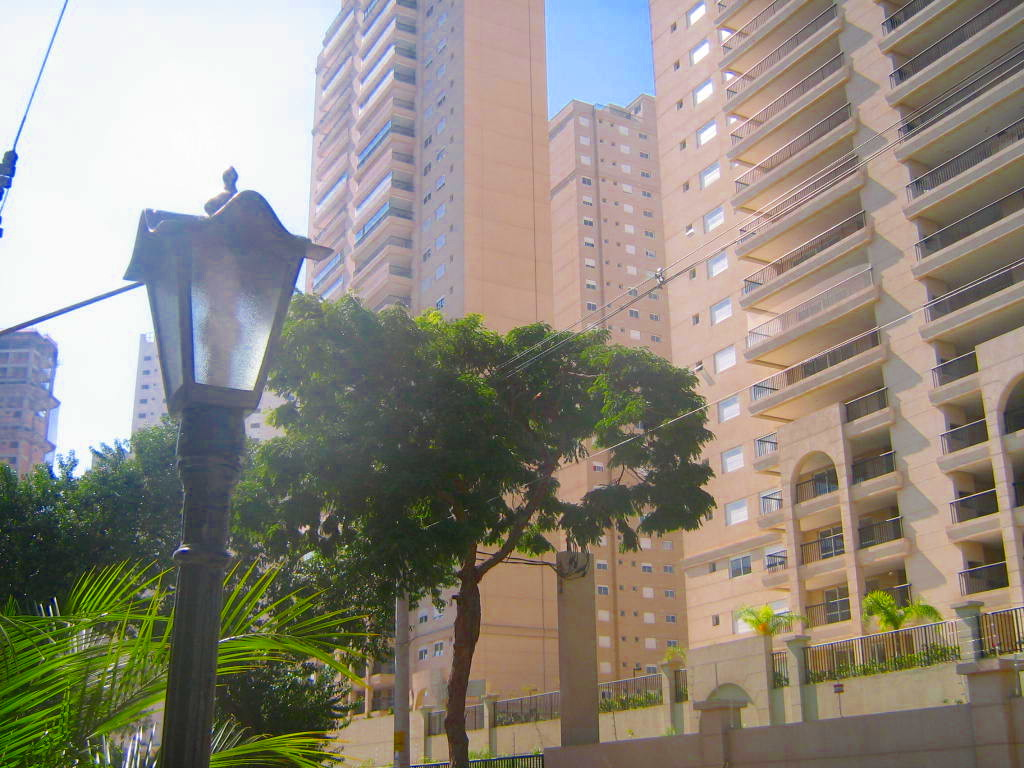
Residential area, Mooca

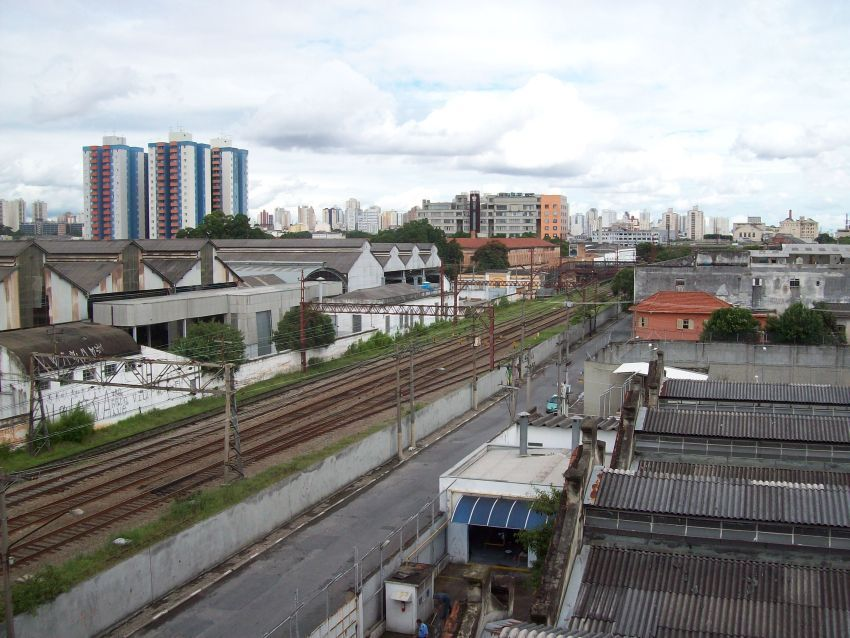
Hipódromo

Mooca's atmosphere has always been that of an industrial suburb. Buildings, homes and warehouses façades preserve traces of the Italian legacy and it is not unusual to find old preserved vilas operárias, narrow cobbled residential streets in large abandoned industries surroundings, where the Italians and other workers from different countries first settled.

However, this scenery has changed as in the last decades industries have been moving out of São Paulo for it has become increasingly expensive. As a result of this phenomenon, many warehouses and industries facilities were simply abandoned, creating perfect conditions for real estate speculation to turn Mooca into one of the fastest-growing districts in Brazil's largest city, consolidating its momentum as a powerhouse in East São Paulo.

Real estate speculation not only is taking place in residential areas, but also in major business areas all over the district. Office towers have been built recently, mainly along Avenida Paes de Barros. BRMalls, a Brazilian shopping centre & real state management corporation, has opened in November, 2011 a state-of-the-art shopping mall in the area, the Mooca Plaza Shopping spanning 112,000 m^{2} (1,205,558 sq ft), and containing over 200 high-end stores.

Due to Mooca's industrial nature, there is a lack of green spaces in the district. The local government holds a tree plantation program through which residents may have trees planted in their sidewalks at no cost. It is quite evident, when visiting some parts of Mooca, that there is a need for green areas and locals have long called for it. Over the past years, the attempts of the government to increase the amount of green spaces in Mooca, along with the launch of residential condominiums projects that adopt a “green” concept have indeed changed much of Mooca's gray landscape.

Mooca is split into four sections (known as bairros), although these are often confused as they are very integrated and locals refer to them simply as Mooca:

• Mooca: central area
• Hipódromo: northwest, along the railway and Avenida Alcântara Machado, known as Radial Leste
• Parque da Mooca: south, along Avenida Paes de Barros
• Alto da Mooca: northeast, along Rua Siqueira Bueno extending to Rua da Mooca

== Transportation ==
=== Buses ===
Mooca is served by several bus and trolleybus lines that connect it to the city centre, neighbouring districts (such as Tatuapé, Belém, Brás and Água Rasa) and also other cities within Greater São Paulo area (e.g. São Caetano do Sul). Some of the most important avenues, such as Avenida Paes de Barros, offer express lanes designed for buses only.

=== Subway ===
São Paulo metro system plays an important role in Mooca's transport network as it services the district and its surroundings with at least 4 (four) subway stations, named Brás, Bresser-Mooca, Belém (on Line 3-Red) and Vila Prudente (on Line 2-Green). The short surface segment of the Line 3-Red of the city's subway system was first built in the 1970s along Avenida Alcântara Machado (Radial Leste), an eight-lane highway which is one of the main gateways to eastern parts of São Paulo.

=== Suburban trains ===
A western part of Mooca which lies along the border with Brás district, is serviced by CPTM's (Companhia Paulista de Trens Metropolitanos) (English: Metropolitan Trains of São Paulo) Line 10-Turquoise from Mooca station and by Line 11-Coral from Brás station, connecting with subway Line 3-Red.

== Education ==
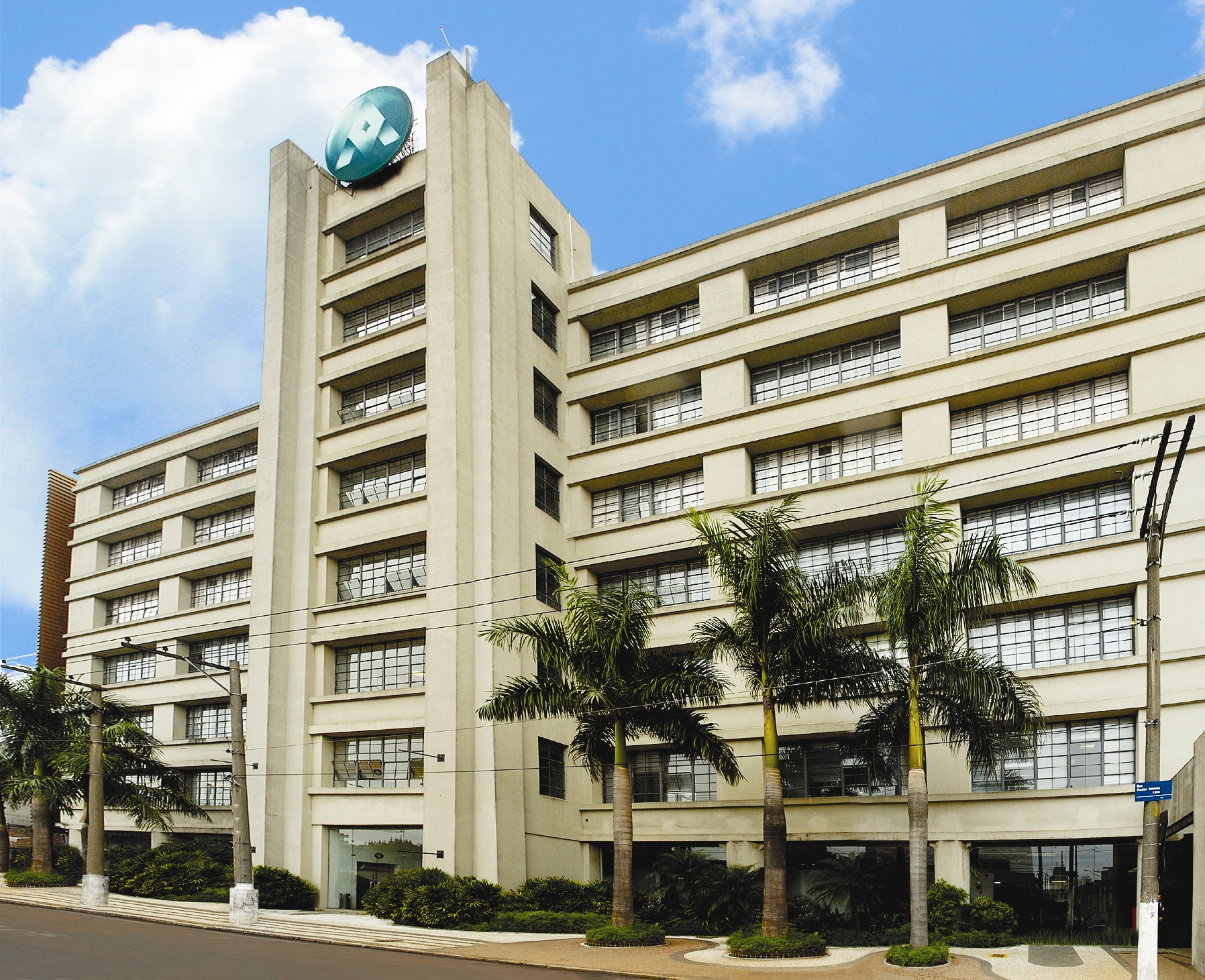
Anhembi Morumbi University

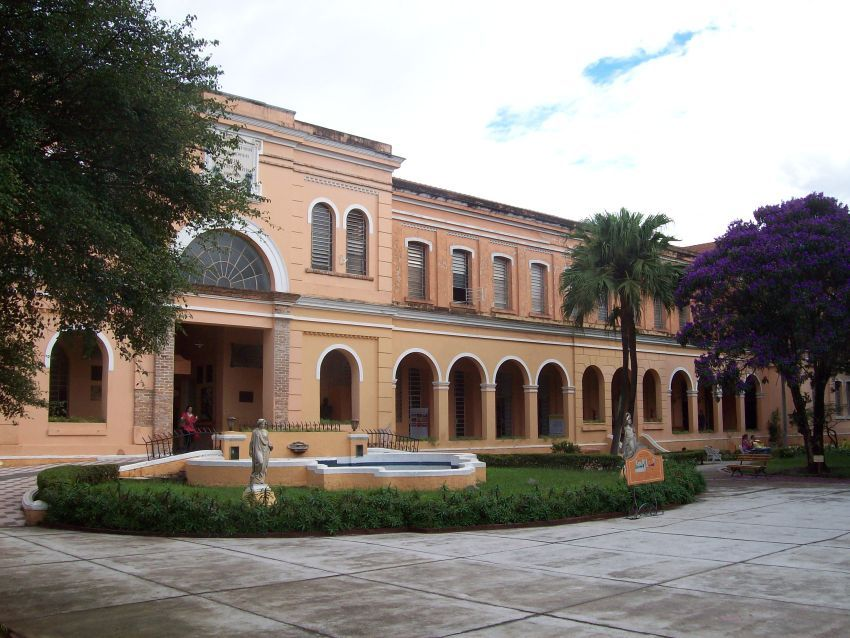
Memorial do Imigrante Museum

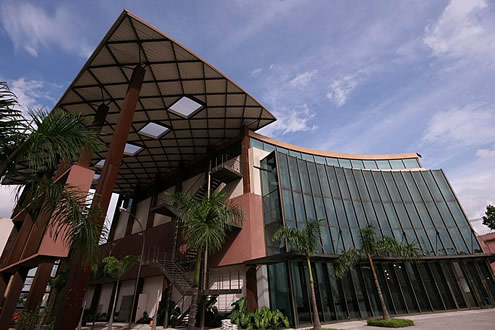
Anhembi Morumbi theatre

The three universities, fifteen public schools (which include infant schools, primary schools, high schools and technical high schools), along with a number of private institutions offer a wide range of education options for students in Mooca. Some public schools are funded by the state of São Paulo while others are funded by the municipality of São Paulo. Additionally, the district offers three theatres, a public library (Biblioteca Affonso Taunay), and the state-ran museum Museu da Imigração.

=== Theatres ===
Teatro Arthur Azevedo
Teatro Anhembi Morumbi (Attached to Universidade Anhembi Morumbi)
Espaço Cultural (Attached to English school Cultura Inglesa)

=== Public schools ===
EMEI Almirante Tamandaré (Municipal infant school)
EMEI Marcílio Dias (Municipal infant school)
EMPG Dr. Fábio da Silva Prado (Municipal primary school)
EMEDA Escola Municipal de 1º Grau (Municipal primary school)
EEPG Armando Araújo (State primary school)
EEPG Prof. José Freitas Carusi (State primary school)
EEPG Prof. Pandiá Calógeras (State primary school)
EEPG Prof. Theodoro de Moraes (State primary school)
EEPSG Antônio Firmino de Proença (State high school)
EEPSG MMDC (State high school)
EEPSG Oswaldo Cruz (State high school)
EEPSG Profa. Adelina Marzagão Alcover (State high school)
ETEC Prof. Camargo Aranha (State technical high school)
SENAI Morvan Figueiredo (Technical high school funded by the National Industry Association)
SENAI Felício Lanzara (Technical high school funded by the National Industry Association)

=== Private schools ===
A great number of Mooca's private schools offers both primary and secondary school courses. There are several church-run private institutions, following Mooca's strong catholic traditions. Some of the most important independent schools, including those ran by the Catholic Church, are:

Colégio São Judas Tadeu
Colégio Santa Catarina
Colégio Ouro Preto
Colégio Santa Amélia
Colégio Passo Seguro
Colégio São Paulo (Anglo)
Instituto Pedagógico Maria Montessori
Instituto de Educação Cruz de Malta
Externato Nossa Senhora Menina
Externato São Rafael
Liceu Santa Cruz

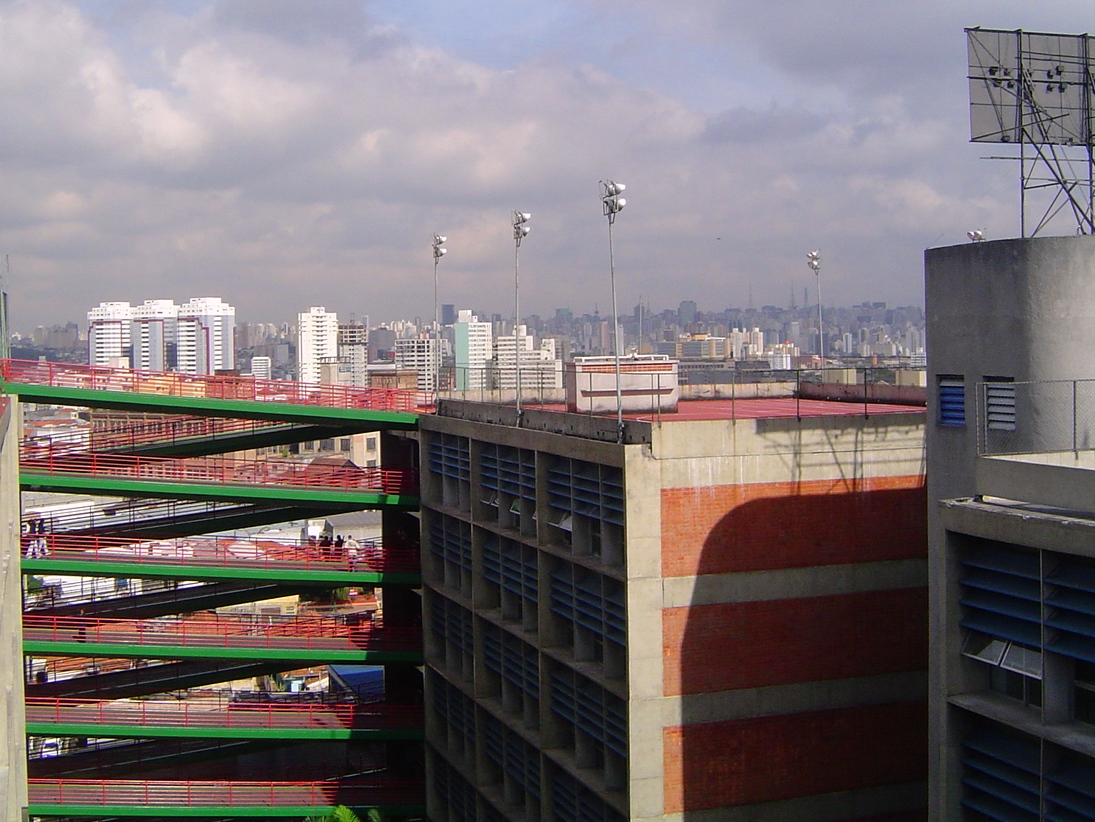
São Judas Tadeu University

=== Universities ===
Few districts in São Paulo contain as many higher education institutions as Mooca. Although there are no public universities, Mooca takes pride in its three private universities campuses:

Universidade São Judas Tadeu
Universidade Anhembi Morumbi
Centro Universitário Capital

== Sport ==
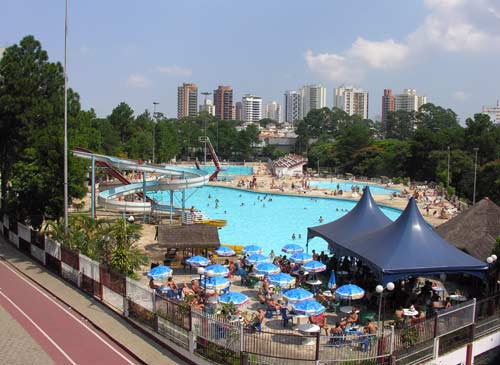
Juventus athletics club

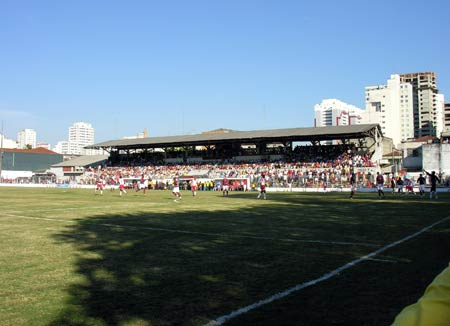
Juventus stadium (cap.2000)

If Mooca lacks green spaces in one hand, it offers sport venues and nature in the 196.000sqm of its sports club, Clube da Mooca, and at the local athletics club, Clube Atlético Juventus, which has a namesake soccer team and a small stadium (Estádio Conde Rodolfo Crespi), as mentioned above. Juventus soccer team was formed in 1924 under the name of Cotonifício Rodolfo Crespi F.C. and consisted of players who worked at Cotonifício Crespi textile industry (see photo above). One year later, a piece of land at Rua Javari next to the plant facilities was donated to the community by Crespi, owner of the textile industry, so that there would be a property for the construction of venue for the community and for the recently formed team to play. Cotonifício Rodolfo Crespi F.C switched its name in 1930, a year after it won São Paulo state league. The name Clube Atlético Juventus was suggested by Crespi. Estádio Conde Rodolfo Crespi hosted in 1959 a match between Juventus and Santos F.C., in which Pelé scored the most beautiful goal in his career. SESC Belenzinho – is a cultural centre and sports venue and, although it is located just outside the district, it is site of interest in the area as provides Mooca's population with a variety of quality theatre plays, busy cultural agenda and sports training (e.g. tennis, soccer, volleyball, basketball, yoga, pilates, etc.)

== Cuisine ==
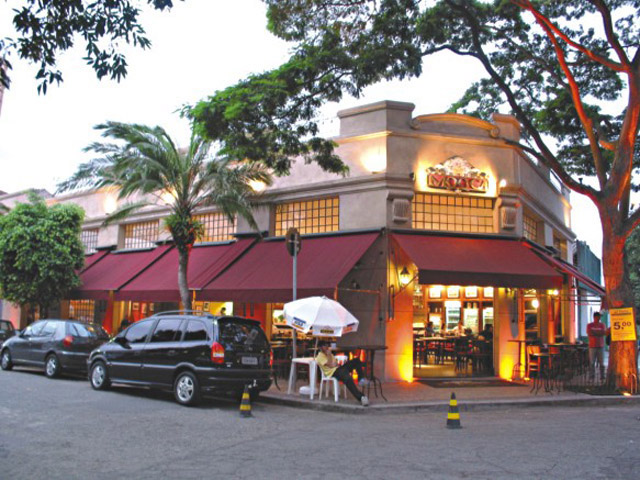
Bar Mooca

Perhaps the highest index of pizza restaurants per inhabitant in São Paulo, and in the entire Latin America, is Mooca. It has at least over 100 pizza restaurants and a large number of Italian restaurants. Mooca is a top destination for people from other parts of the city who are looking for fine Italian food.
