= Vila Prudente =

Vila Prudente may refer to:

- Subprefecture of Vila Prudente, São Paulo
- Vila Prudente (district of São Paulo)
- Vila Prudente (São Paulo Metro)
