= Pari (district of São Paulo) =

District of São Paulo, Brazil

Coordinates: 23.5276°S 46.6124°W

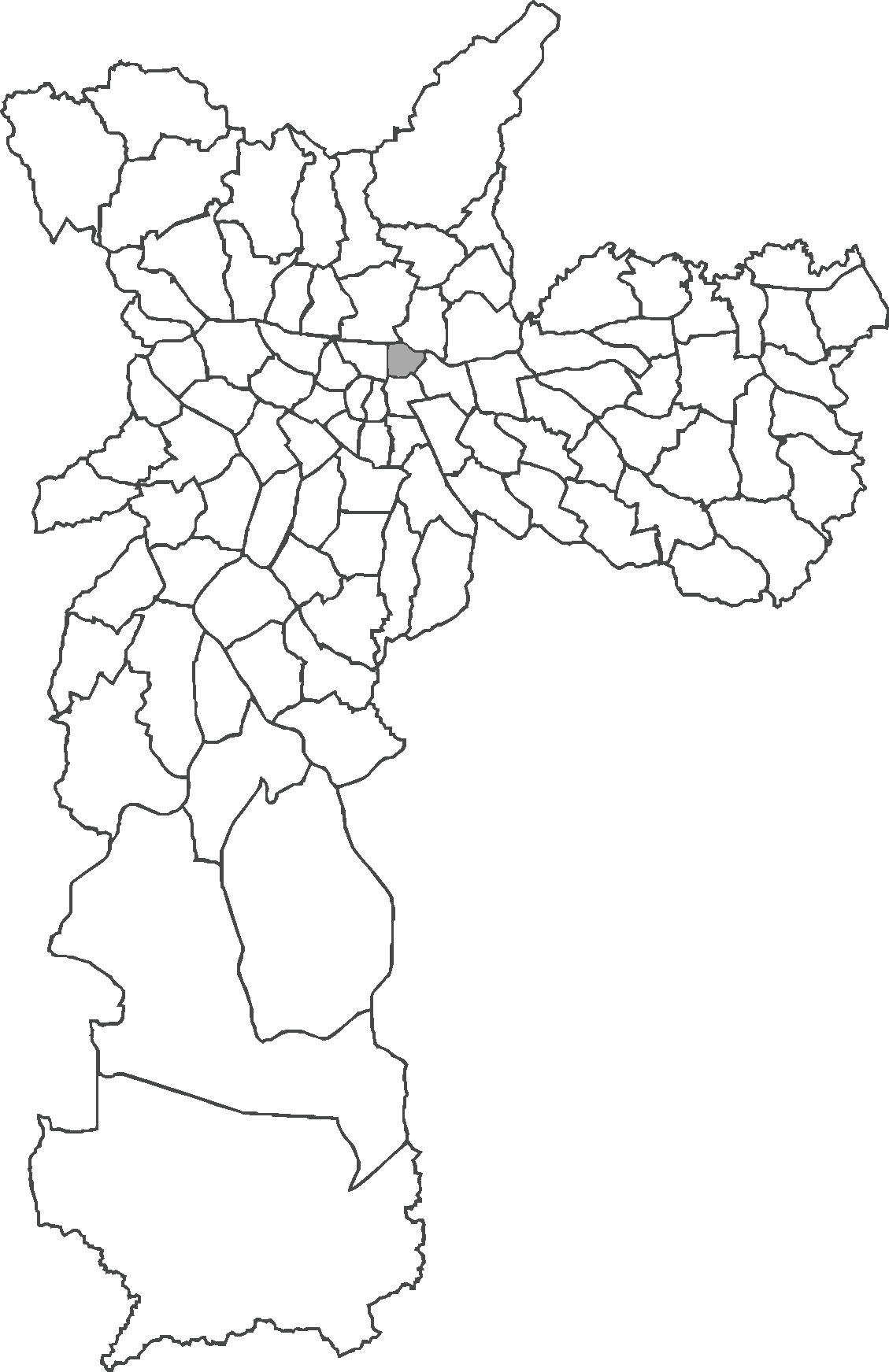
- District of the city of São Paulo
- Country: Brazil
- State: São Paulo
- Municipality: São Paulo
- Subprefecture: Mooca

Area
  - Total: 2.90 km^{2} (1.12 sq mi)

Population (2007)
  - Total: 17,299
  - Density: 5,965/km^{2} (15,450/sq mi)
- Website: Subprefecture of Mooca

Pari is one of 96 districts in the city of São Paulo, Brazil. Administratively part of the Southeast Zone of São Paulo, Pari is located immediately to the east of the historic downtown in the Subprefecture of Mooca.
