= Bernardo Daddi =

Italian Renaissance painter of Florence (c. 1280–1348)

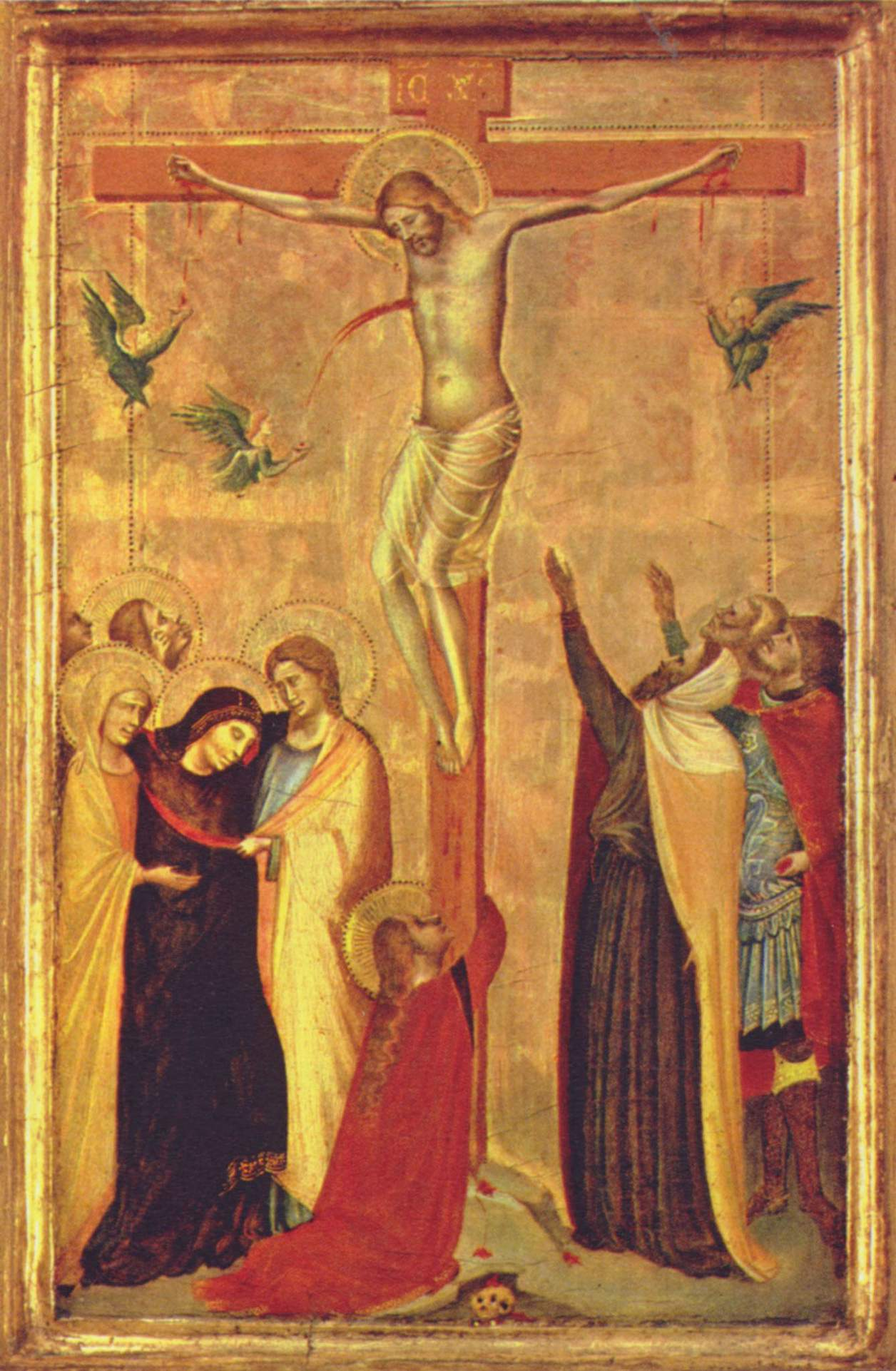
Crucifixion (1340–1345)

Bernardo Daddi (c. 1280 – 1348) was an early Italian Renaissance painter and the leading painter of Florence of his generation. He was one of the artists who contributed to the revolutionary art of the Renaissance, which broke away from the conventions of the preceding generation of Gothic artists, by creating compositions which aimed to achieve a more realistic representation of reality. He was particularly successful with his small-scale works and contributed to the development of the portable altarpiece, a format that subsequently gained great popularity.

== Life and work ==
Daddi's birth date remains unknown. He is first mentioned in 1312. He may have been a pupil of Giotto.

Daddi's style is derived from Giotto's work. His early works also show a close link with followers of Giotto such as the Master of Santa Cecilia and other Florentine masters of the first quarter of the 14th century. His later style is highly refined and shows a certain influence by Maso di Banco.

Daddi likely operated a large workshop, as a great number of paintings in his style have surfaced which show the various hands of his pupils and assistants. Despite his high level of craftsmanship, his lyrical elegance is somewhat dampened by a certain academic and mechanical hardness.

Daddi focused on religious motifs and altarpieces. A triptych he painted in 1328 is in the Uffizi, and there are several panels in National Gallery of Art and the Walters Art Museum. The Pinacoteca of the Vatican Museums houses his Martyrdom of Saint Stephen, a predella in eight panels painted about 1345. He was also influenced by the Sienese art of Lorenzetti.

Daddi's last work dates from 1347, and it is believed he died the next year.

== Selected works ==
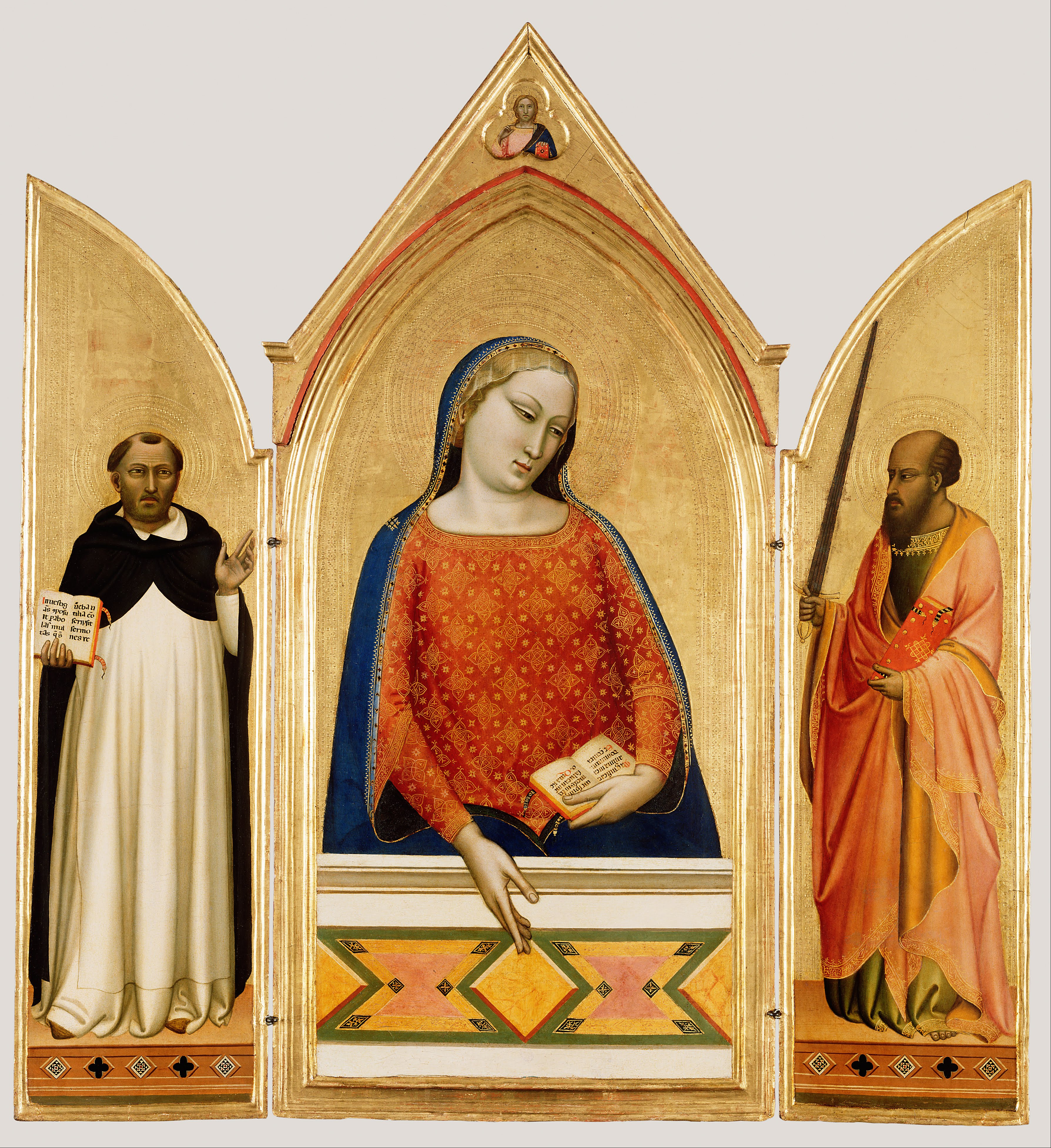
Madonna and Saints Thomas Aquinas and Paul

- The Martyrdom of St Stephen (1324, unverified)
- Madonna and Two Saints, or Ognissanti Triptych (1328)
- Processional Cross (1330s), National Gallery of Victoria
- St. Ursula (1333)
- Madonna and Child (1335), Orsanmichele, Florence
- Nativity and Annunciation to the Shepherds (1336), Museum of Fine Arts, Boston
- Four Musical Angels, part of the altarpiece The Coronation of the Virgin, Christ Church Picture Gallery, Oxford
- The Marriage of the Virgin (1336–1340)
- Polyptych of S. Pancrazio (1336–1340)
- The Assumption of the Virgin (1337–1339)
- Triptych: The Virgin and Child Enthroned with Saints (1338), Courtauld Institute of Art
- Triptych with Madonna and Christ Child (1339), Minneapolis Institute of Art
- The Coronation of the Virgin (ca. 1340–1345), National Gallery
  - Polyptych: The Crucifixion and Saints (1348), Courtauld Institute of Art
- " Madonna and Christ Child With Saints, Crucifixion, Annunciation (1330's), The Frick Pittsburgh
