= China in Box =

Chinese fast food restaurant chain in Brazil

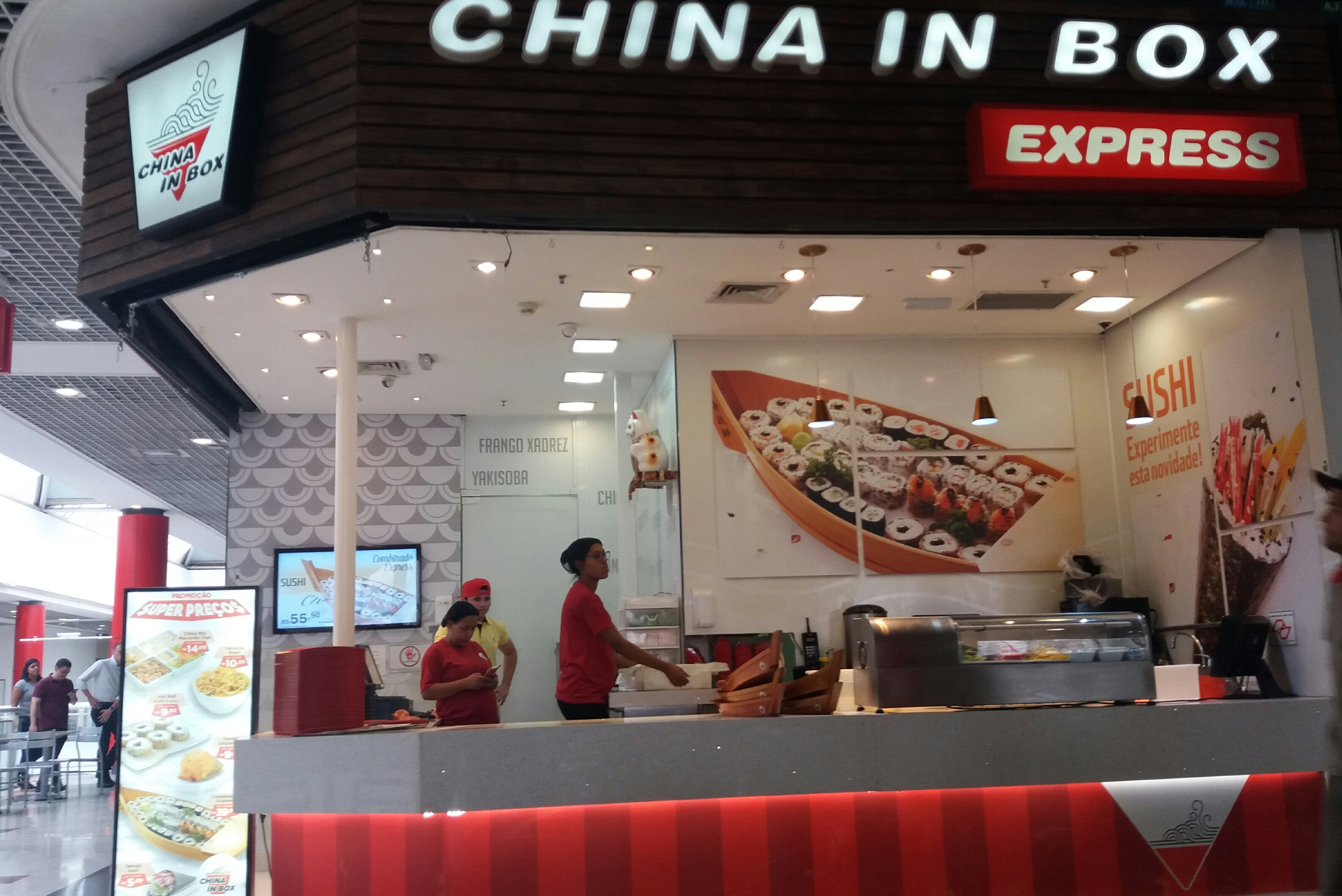
- China in Box in Tatuapé, a city district of São Paulo
- Industry: Restaurants
- Genre: Fast food
- Founded: 1992
- Founder: Robinson Shiba
- Owner: Grupo Trigo
- Website: https://www.chinainbox.com.br

China In Box is a Brazilian restaurant chain that develops the concept of fast food to Asian cuisine.

The company was established in 1992 by Robinson Shiba. In 2021, TrendFoods, the former owner of China in Box, was sold to Grupo Trigo, creating the largest Asian food company in the country.

Currently, the chain has over 145 restaurants located throughout Brazil.

== History ==
China in Box's history began in 1986 with a trip of friends to the United States.
