= Água Rasa =

District of São Paulo, Brazil

Coordinates: 23.6°S 46.6°W

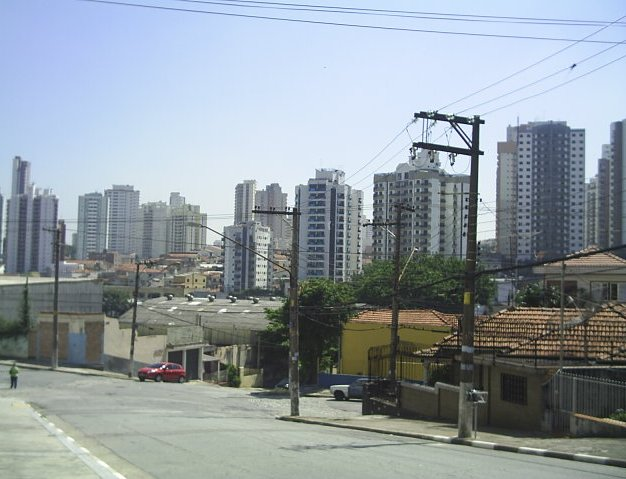

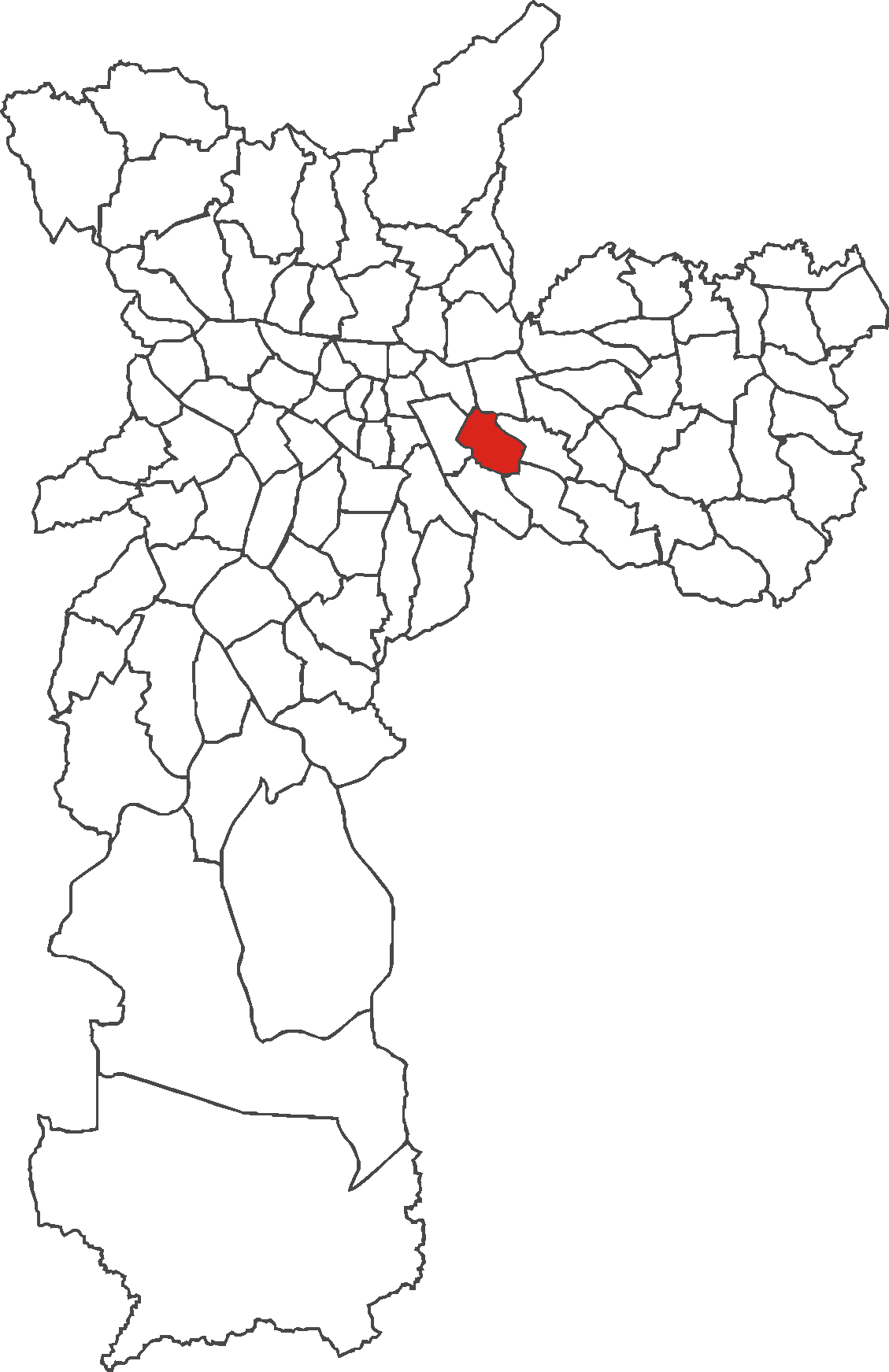
- Location in the city of São Paulo
- Country: Brazil
- State: São Paulo
- Region: Southeast
- City: São Paulo
- Administrative Zone: Southeast
- Subprefecture: Mooca
- Bairros: List: Água Rasa; Alto da Mooca; Chácara Mafalda; Chácara Paraíso; Jardim Guanabara; Jardim Haddad; Jardim Itália; Jardim Silveira; Vila Bertioga; Vila Celeste; Vila Cláudia; Vila Clotilde; Vila Diva; Vila Graciosa; Vila Invernada; Vila Leme; Vila Libanesa; Vila Lúcia Elvira; Vila Oratório; Vila Paulina; Vila Regente Feijó; Vila Rio Branco; Vila Santa Clara

Government
  - Type: Subprefecture
  - Subprefect: Sérgio Carlos Filho

Area
  - Total: 7.12 km^{2} (2.75 sq mi)

Population (2008)
  - Total: 80,484
  - Density: 11,301.13/km^{2} (29,269.8/sq mi)

Água Rasa is a district within the subprefecture of Mooca in São Paulo, Brazil.

== Neighborhoods ==
1. Água Rasa
2. Alto da Mooca
3. Chácara Mafalda
4. Chácara Paraíso
5. Jardim Guanabara
6. Jardim Haddad
7. Jardim Itália
8. Jardim Silveira
9. Vila Bertioga
10. Vila Celeste
11. Vila Cláudia
12. Vila Clotilde
13. Vila Diva
14. Vila Graciosa
15. Vila Invernada
16. Vila Leme
17. Vila Libanesa
18. Vila Lúcia Elvira
19. Vila Oratório
20. Vila Paulina
21. Vila Regente Feijó
22. Vila Rio Branco
23. Vila Santa Clara
