= Subprefecture of Mooca =

Coordinates: 23.5511°S 46.6342°W

- Subprefecture
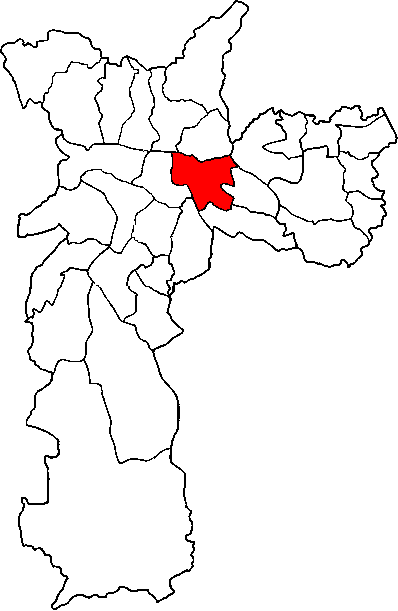
- Location of the Subprefecture of Mooca in São Paulo

- Location of municipality of São Paulo within the State of São Paulo
- Country: Brazil
- Region: Southeast
- State: São Paulo
- Municipality: São Paulo
- Administrative Zone: Southeast
- Districts: Brás, Mooca, Belém, Pari, Água Rasa, Tatuapé

Government
  - Type: Subprefecture
  - Subprefect: Rubens Casado

Area
  - Total: 35.92 km^{2} (13.87 sq mi)

Population (2008)
  - Total: 286,598
- Website: Subprefeitura Mooca (Portuguese)

The Subprefecture of Mooca is one of 32 subprefectures of the city of São Paulo, Brazil. It comprises six districts: Brás, Mooca, Belém, Pari, Água Rasa, and Tatuapé.

It's a historical place of the city, where much of the industrial development of the city took place. It hosts the Museum of Immigration of the State of São Paulo and the headquarters of two of the largest universities in São Paulo (Universidade São Judas Tadeu and Universidade Cidade de São Paulo). Also the headquarters of the football teams Corinthians and Clube Atlético Juventus are in this subprefecture.

== See also ==
- Roman Catholic Archdiocese of São Paulo
