= Brás =

District of São Paulo, Brazil

Coordinates: 23.541°S 46.616°W

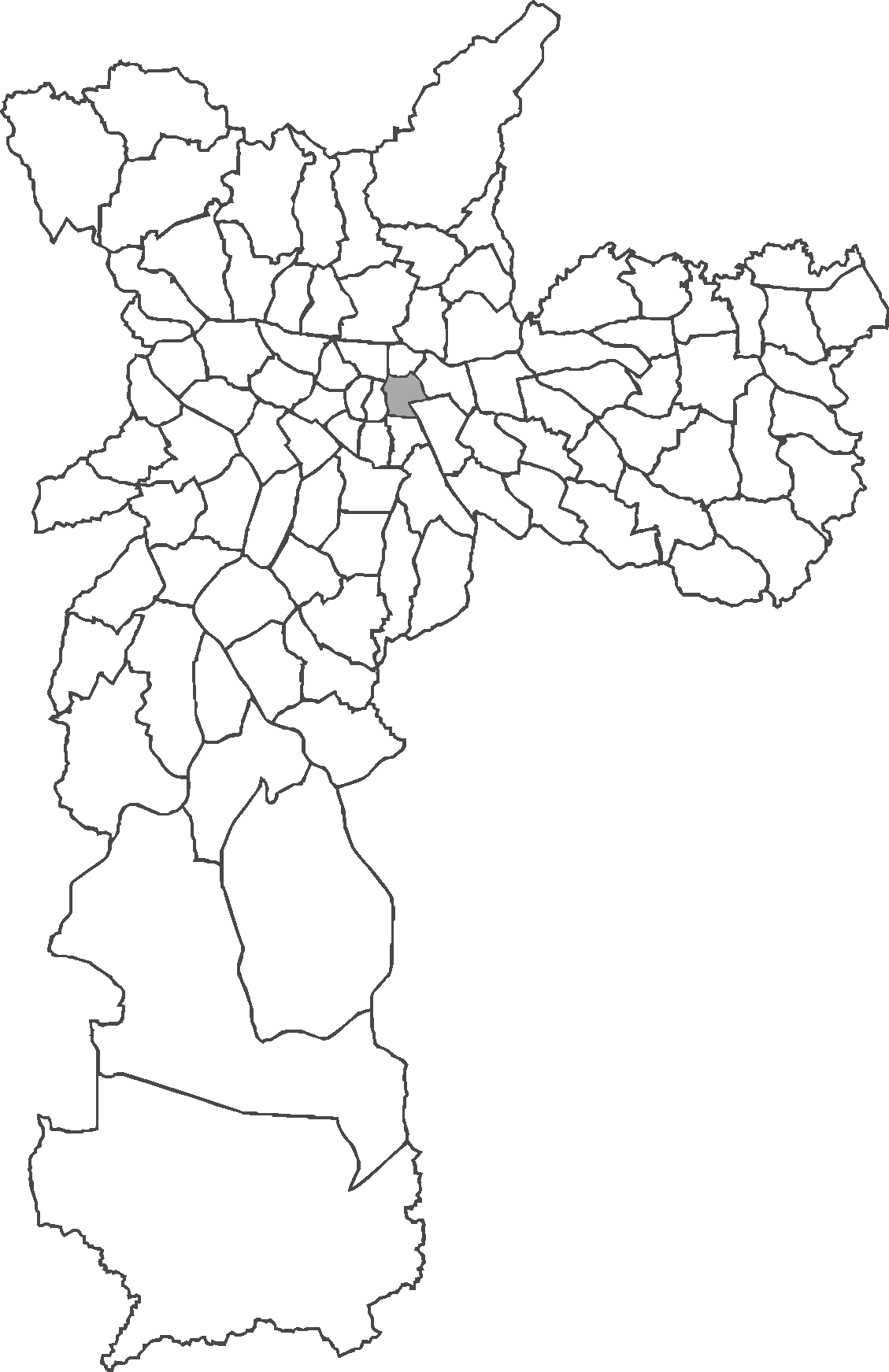
- District of the city of São Paulo
- Country: Brazil
- State: São Paulo
- Municipality: São Paulo
- Subprefecture: Mooca

Area
  - Total: 3.5 km^{2} (1.4 sq mi)

Population (2007)
  - Total: 29,265
  - Density: 8,361/km^{2} (21,650/sq mi)
- Website: Subprefecture of Mooca

Brás is one of 96 districts in the city of São Paulo, Brazil. Administratively part of the Southeast Zone of São Paulo, Brás is located immediately to the east of the historic downtown in the Subprefecture of Mooca. The district is an area of heavy industry with many factories and warehouses, known as a center of textile manufacturing.

Two sets of railroad tracks cut across the district; the Brás rail station serves Metrô Line 3 (red) and three commuter rail lines operated by CPTM: Line 10 (turquoise), 11 (coral), and 12 (sapphire).

Brás is famous for hosting the Feirinha da Madrugada informal street market.

== See also ==
- Roman Catholic Archdiocese of São Paulo
