= Vila Prudente (district of São Paulo) =

District of São Paulo, Brazil

Coordinates: 23.5798°S 46.582°W

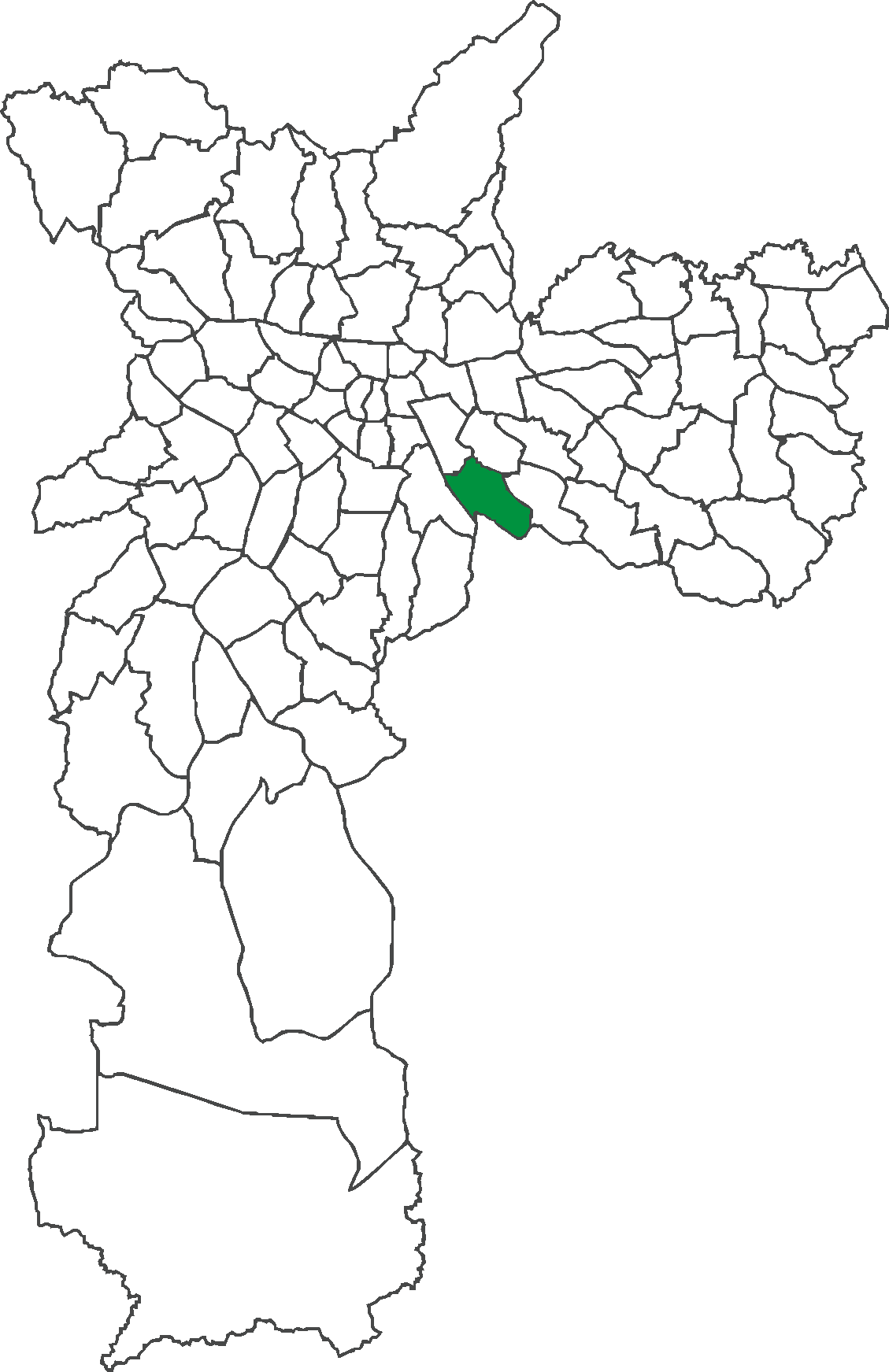
- District of the city of São Paulo
- Country: Brazil
- State: São Paulo
- Municipality: São Paulo
- Subprefecture: Vila Prudente

Area
  - Total: 9.90 km^{2} (3.82 sq mi)

Population (2007)
  - Total: 104,242
  - Density: 10,529/km^{2} (27,270/sq mi)
- Website: Subprefecture of Vila Prudente

Vila Prudente is one of 96 districts in the city of São Paulo, Brazil.
