= Anhembi Morumbi University =

Private university in Brazil

- Universidade Anhembi Morumbi
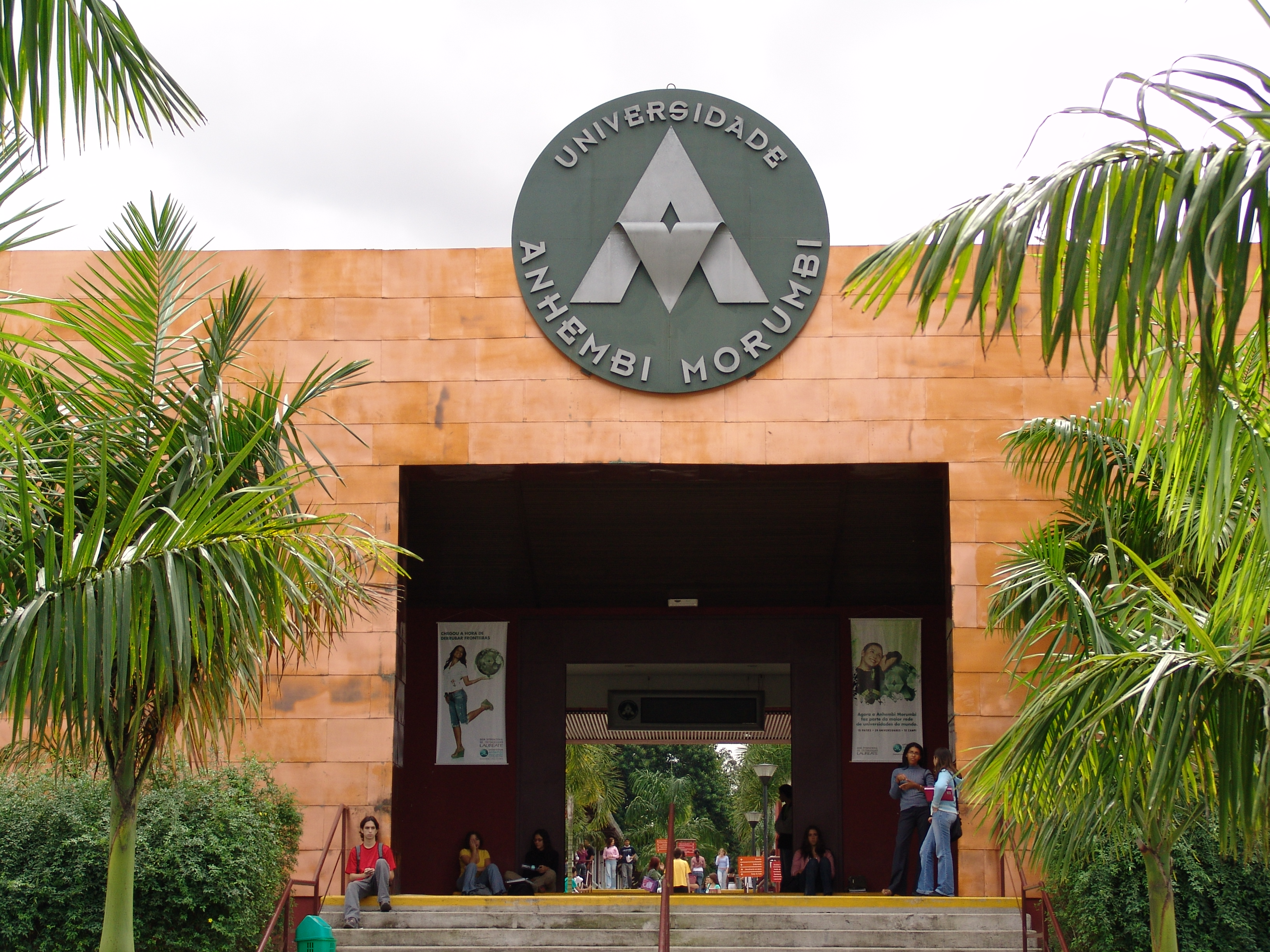
- Type: Private - Research
- Established: 1970
- President: Eduardo Araujo
- Rector: Oscar Hipólito
- Location: São Paulo, São Paulo, Brazil; 23.6005°S 46.6749°W
- Campus: Urban
- Language: Portuguese
- Colours: Persian green White
- Website: www.anhembi.br

Universidade Anhembi Morumbi is a Brazilian private university located in São Paulo and member of the Anima Educação group. Ranked one of the top three private universities in the state of São Paulo, the university is one of the most prestigious in various areas of knowledge such as medicine, engineering, business, communication, gastronomy and fashion design. UAM is also known as the first international university of Brazil.

UAM is ranked 351st out of about 800 colleges in Latin America by Top Universities. It is also ranked 76th in Brazil by Unirank.
