= Subprefecture of Vila Prudente =

Coordinates: 23°35′05″S 46°35′22″W

- Subprefecture
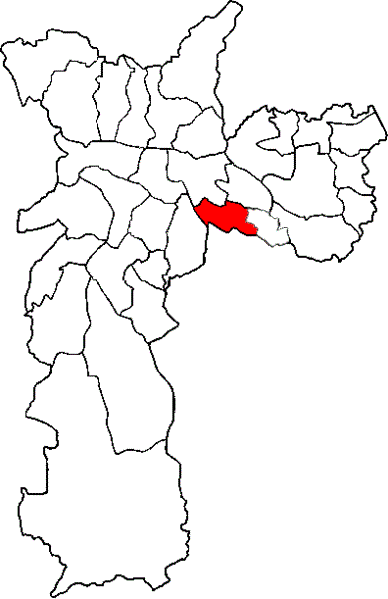
- Location of the Subprefecture of Vila Prudente in São Paulo

- Location of municipality of São Paulo within the State of São Paulo
- Country: Brazil
- Region: Southeast
- State: São Paulo
- Municipality: São Paulo
- Administrative Zone: Southeast
- Districts: Vila Prudente, São Lucas

Government
  - Type: Subprefecture
  - Subprefect: Wilson Sergio Pedroso Jr

Area
  - Total: 32.65 km^{2} (12.61 sq mi)

Population (2008)
  - Total: 520,670
- Website: Subprefeitura Vila Prudente (Portuguese)

The Subprefecture of Vila Prudente is one of 32 subprefectures of the city of São Paulo, Brazil. It comprises two districts: Vila Prudente and São Lucas.
