= Universidade São Judas Tadeu =

Private university in Brazil

- Type: Private
- Established: 1971
- Rector: Prof. José Christiano Altenfelder Silva Mesquita
- Students: 20.000
- Location: São Paulo, SP, Brazil; 23.5522°S 46.5976°W
- Campus: Mooca, Butantã, Jabaquara, Paulista, Santana, Santo Amaro, Vila Leopoldina, São Bernardo do Campo, Guarulhos, Cubatão and Unimonte.
- Website: http://www.usjt.br

Universidade São Judas Tadeu (USJT) is a Brazilian private, for-profit university based in São Paulo. Established in 1971 as a college offering two undergraduate courses (Business Administration and Accounting), it only officially became a university in 1989.

== Campuses ==
São Judas Tadeu University, or São Judas as it commonly referred to, has two campuses in the city of São Paulo: the main one, located in the district of Mooca is a five-building complex containing 174 classrooms, 128 laboratories, a large library, 2 large lecture theatres and a theatre. It has easy access to Bresser-Mooca and Belém São Paulo metro stations.

The university's campus in Butantã is a modern, recently inaugurated single building located minutes from the Butantã metro station. As of now, it does not offer as many course options as the main campus in Mooca, although over the time there are projections of an increase in the number of students and consequently, courses offered.

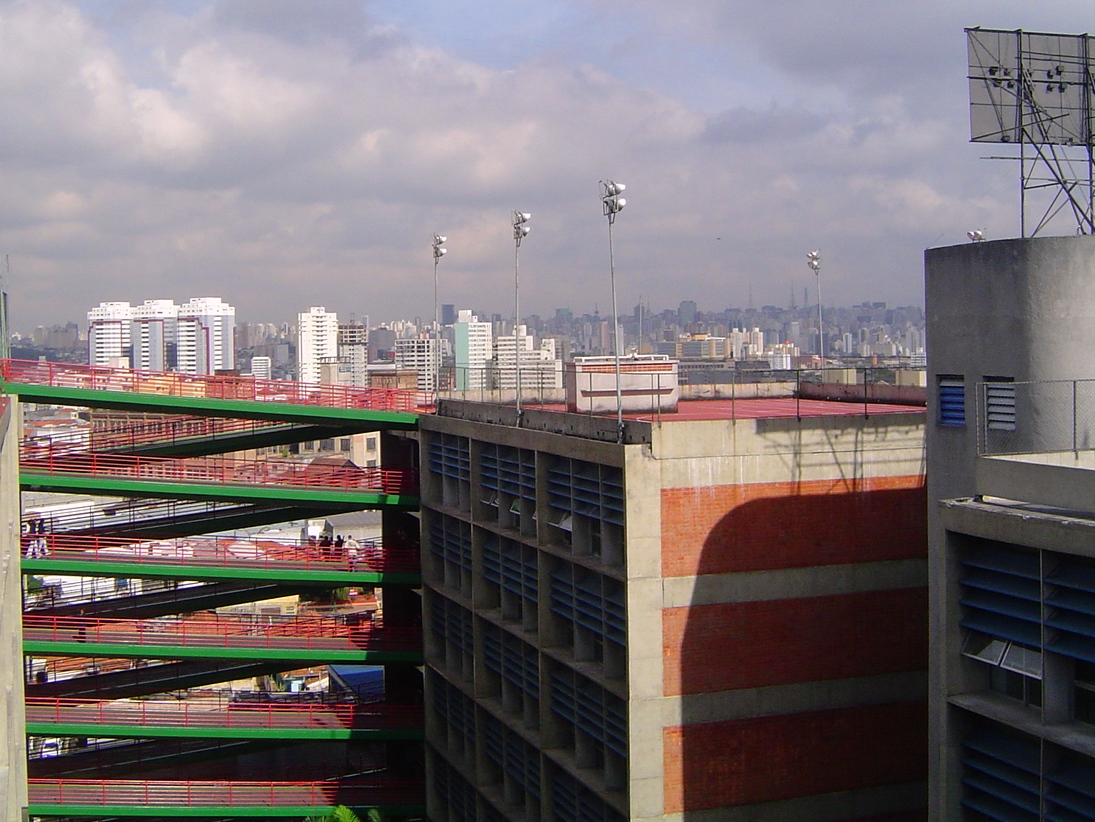
Mooca campus

== Courses ==
The university offers a wide range of undergraduate courses and at least forty post-graduate courses and five master's degrees in several fields of study.

Faculty of Biology and Health Sciences

Biology
Physical Education
Pharmacy
Physiotherapy
Nutrition

Faculty of Humanities

Business Management (major in Business Administration)
Business Management (major in International Trade)
Accounting
Economics
Philosophy
Psychology
Tourism

Faculty of Law

Law

Faculty of Languages, Arts and Communication

Architecture and Urbanism
Social Communication (major in Journalism)
Social Communication (major in Publicity and Advertising)
Social Communication (major in Radio and Television Studies)
Design
Art (major in Plastic Arts)
Art (major in Acting)
English Literature
Portuguese Literature
Pedagogy
Translation and Interpreting

Faculty of Technology and Exact Sciences

Computer Science
Engineering (major in Civil Engineering)
Engineering (major in Computer Engineering)
Engineering (major in Industrial Engineering)
Engineering (major in Electronic Engineering)
Engineering (major in Mechanical Engineering)
Information Technology
