= Lorenzetti =

Lorenzetti is an Italian surname. Notable people with the surname include:

- Ambrogio Lorenzetti (c. 1290–1348), Sienese painter
- Angelo Lorenzetti (born 1964), Italian volleyball coach
- Daniel Lorenzetti, author, documentary photographer, and explorer
- Dario Lorenzetti (1970–2012), American military officer and intelligence operative
- Enrico Lorenzetti (1911–1989), Italian motorcycle road racer
- Gustavo Lorenzetti (born 1985), Argentine footballer
- Maria Rita Lorenzetti (born 1953), Italian politician
- Pietro Lorenzetti (c. 1280–1348), Sienese painter, brother of Ambrogio Lorenzetti
- Ricardo Lorenzetti (born 1955), Argentine judge
- Tommaso Lorenzetti (born 1985), Italian motorcycle racer
