= Tatuapé =

District of São Paulo, Brazil

Coordinates: 23°32′17.30″S 46°34′0.82″W

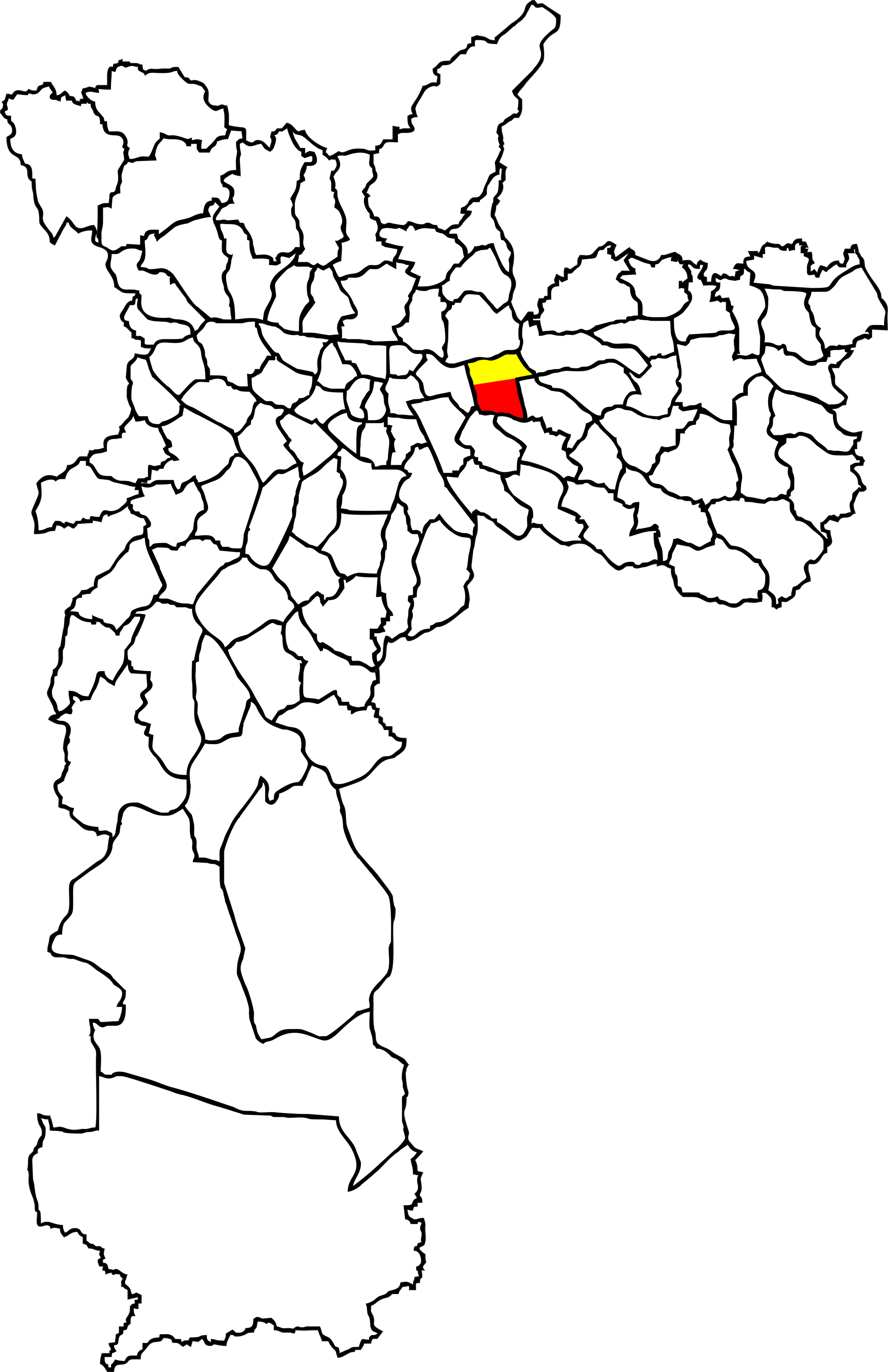
- Location in the city of São Paulo

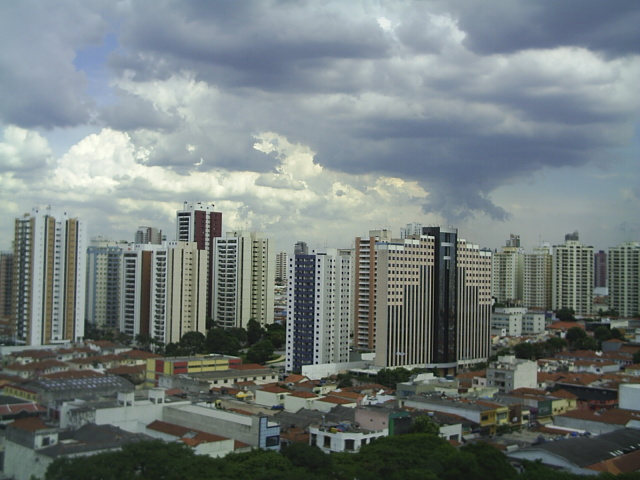
- Skyline of Tatuapé
- Country: Brazil
- State: São Paulo
- City: São Paulo

Government
  - Type: Subprefecture
  - Subprefect: Rubens Casado

Population (2001)
  - Total: 81.840
- HDI: 0.956 –high
- Website: Subprefecture of Mooca

Tatuapé (Portuguese pronunciation: [tatwaˈpɛ], from Tupi Guarani "path of the armadillo", or "short way") is a district in the subprefecture of Mooca, in São Paulo, Brazil. It is divided by a railway and the eight lane Radial Leste highway cutting the district into two, northern and southern, parts.

It is home to Platina 220, the tallest building of São Paulo.

Southern Tatuapé is the most developed side, and it was one of the first regions in Brazil where viticulture was established. Vines were first planted on these north-facing slopes in 1550 and production was widespread by the end of the 19th century, with the establishment of farms owned by Italian families arriving in the district.

In the mid 20th century the district became heavily industrialized and polluted but the closure of clothing and ceramics factories in the 1980s left brownfield sites used for developing luxury apartment buildings. Gentrification has brought high per capita incomes. Residents of the district have a life expectancy of 80 years, the highest within the entire city, and the Human Development Index of 0.936.

Many of the inhabitants of the district have Italian, Spanish, Portuguese ancestry as well as a number with Japanese and Polish heritage. This southern part of Tatuapé is a middle-to-upper class area of São Paulo regarded as a home for the "new rich" paulistanos. It has also two shopping malls, including the first in São Paulo directly connected to a metro station. It also has two international standard hotels (Meliá Tryp and Blue Tree), because the district is placed between the city center and Guarulhos International Airport. In 2007, the city government took over the Analia Franco Park on the southern edge of the district, which boasts extensive sporting facilities and the largest swimming pool in Latin America with a capacity of 5.5 million litres of water.

The northern part of Tatuapé - Parque São Jorge - is an area of mixed light industry and middle class housing and was overtaken economically in the 1990s by the building boom in the southern part. Parque São Jorge is the home of Corinthians, one of the most popular Brazilian football teams. Nearby, next to the River Tietê, Piqueri Park is a green oasis of 10 hectares and one of the few large parks in the city.

== Current affairs ==
It is a neighborhood with a strong industrial tradition, with some of the largest Brazilian industries located within its borders, such as Itautec, Souza Cruz and Grupo Vicunha, as well as other smaller industries. Although some factories have been closed, these industries continue to have offices or departments located in the region.

== See also ==
- Casa do Sítio Tatuapé
