= Southeast Zone of São Paulo =

Coordinates: 23°33′30″S 46°35′15″W

Southeast Zone of São Paulo Zona Sudeste
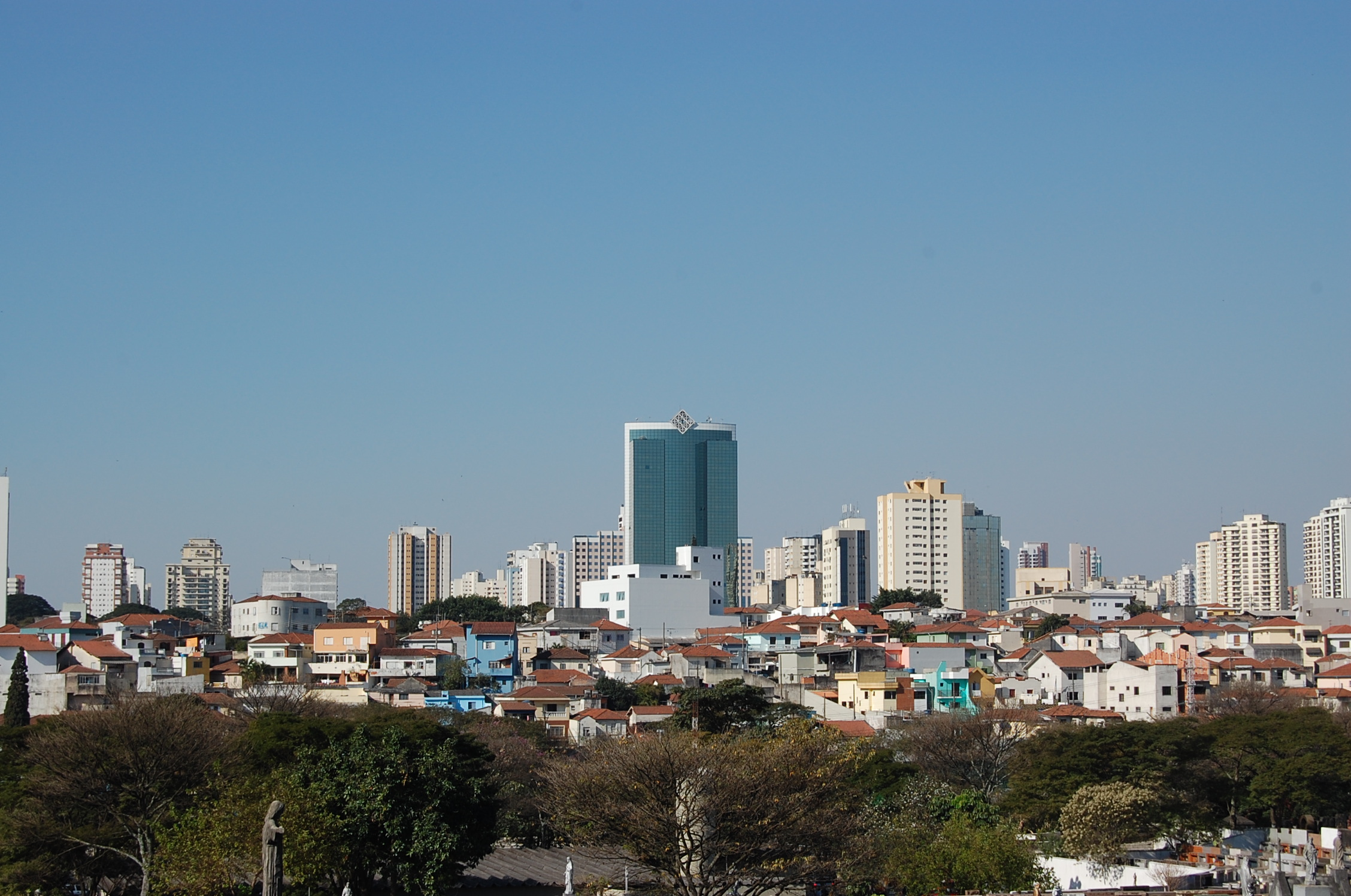

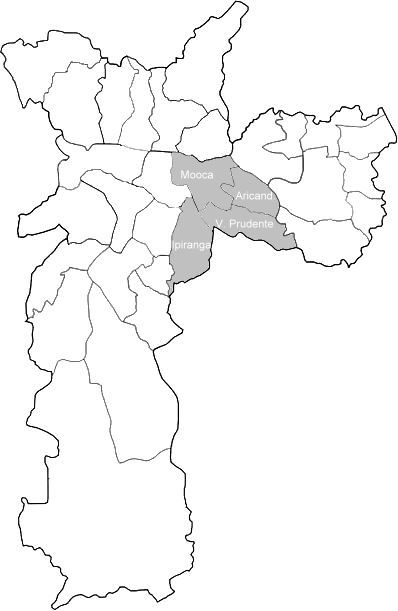
- Location of Southeast Zone in São Paulo
- Country: Brazil
- State: São Paulo
- City: São Paulo
- Regional prefectures: List: Mooca; Aricanduva; Vila Prudente; Ipiranga; Sapopemba

The Southeast Zone is an Administrative Zone of São Paulo, Brazil.
