= Marie Rennotte =

Belgian-Brazilian teacher and physician (1852–1942)

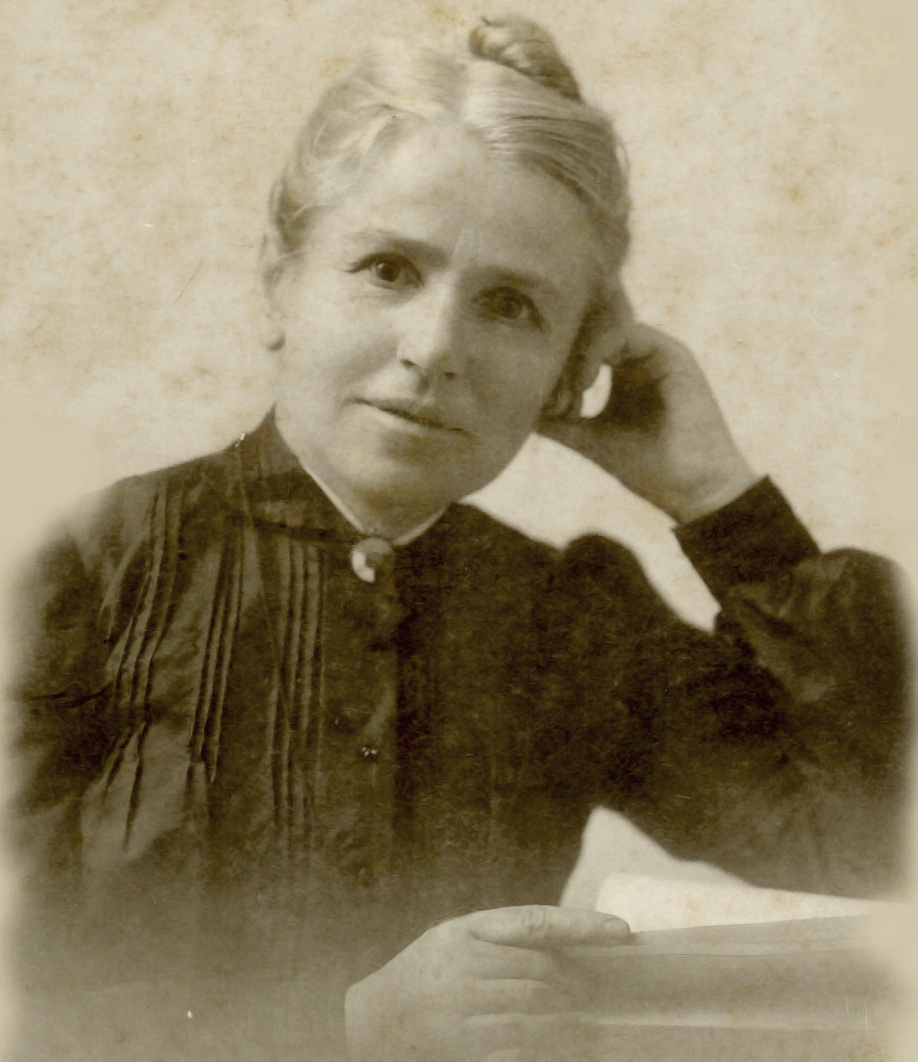
- Rennotte ca. 1900–1910
- Born: Jeanne Françoise Joséphine Marie Rennotte; 11 February 1852; Souverain-Wandre near Liège, Belgium
- Died: 21 November 1942 (aged 90); São Paulo, Brazil
- Other names: Marie Renotte
- Occupations: Physician, teacher, women's rights activist
- Years active: 1875–1935

Marie Rennotte (11 February 1852 – 21 November 1942) was a Belgian-born Brazilian physician, teacher, and women's rights activist. She was active in the fight for women's rights. After earning her teaching credentials in Belgium and France, Rennotte taught for three years in Germany before moving to Brazil as a governess. Giving private lessons and teaching at a girls' school, she lived in Rio de Janeiro from 1878 to 1882. Hired to teach in the State of São Paulo, she moved to Piracicaba where from 1882 to 1889 she taught science, developed the curriculum, and enhanced the reputation of the Colégio Piracicabano. The co-educational school was an innovative institution offering equal education to girls and boys.

In 1889, on a scholarship provided by the State of São Paulo, Rennotte enrolled in medical school at the Woman's Medical College of Pennsylvania in Philadelphia. That year, she was granted citizenship when a legal change allowed all foreigners permanently living in Brazil to become naturalized. Graduating in 1892, she studied at the Paris Hôtel-Dieu Hospital between 1893 and 1895, completing a specialization in obstetrics and gynaecology. Upon her return to Brazil, she defended her thesis to a jury from the Faculty of Medicine and Pharmacy of the University of Rio de Janeiro, validating her degree and allowing her to practice medicine in the country. From 1895 to 1899, Rennotte directed the obstetrics and maternity unit of the Maternity Hospital of São Paulo. She attended patients in the hospital as well as in private homes where she helped to deliver babies. Opening her own practice after she resigned from the Maternity Hospital, she operated a dispensary for the poor and immigrant communities, while continuing to see paying patients.

In 1901, she was admitted as a member of the São Paulo branch of the Brazilian Historic and Geographic Institute. She conducted research at the surgery of the Santa Casa da Misericórdia on the effects of chloroform as an anesthetic from 1906 to 1910. Then she traveled to Europe to study how to establish a Red Cross Branch in São Paulo. Upon her return she founded the local branch in 1912, opened a nurses training school, and began a campaign to found the first children's hospital in São Paulo. She continued to practice medicine through the mid-1920s, but increasingly in the late 1920s and the 1930s became more involved in the international feminist movement and scientific conferences. In 1922, she founded the Aliança Paulista pelo Sufrágio Feminino (Paulistan Alliance for Women's Suffrage). By the late 1930s, suffering from ill health, blindness and deafness, she was granted a state pension, which she collected until her death in 1942. She is remembered for her work to improve women's educational and health care options, and women's rights to employment and citizenship. She is also recognized as one of those who defined feminist thought in Brazil during the 19th century.

== Early life ==
Jeanne Françoise Joséphine Marie Rennotte was born on 11 February 1852 in the Souverain-Wandre near Liège, Belgium. After graduating in 1873 from the École normale de Liège (Normal School of Liège), she continued her education in Paris. In 1874, she earned a certificate to teach elementary education from the Société pour l'Instruction Élémentaire (Society for Elementary Education) and the following year, passed the examination required by the French government to begin teaching.

== Career ==
=== Teaching ===
Upon receiving her certification, Rennotte accepted a post in Mannheim, Germany, where she taught French language courses for three years. In May 1878, she arrived in Rio de Janeiro, Brazil, to work as a governess. She remained there working as a private tutor and teaching at private schools, including the Colegio Werneck (Werneck College), a girls' school directed by Ana Isabel Peixoto de Lacerda Werneck. Rennotte taught drawing, French and German languages, and writing at Colégio Werneck until 1882, when she was hired by missionary Martha Watts of Kentucky to teach at the newly founded Colégio Piracicabano (Piracicabano College) in Piracicaba. The girls' boarding school implemented innovative principles for women's education, instead of the typical education available at the time which prepared girls for domestic and social spheres. Championing co-education and gender equality, it offered a well-rounded curriculum, including courses in languages, literature, mathematics, philosophy, and natural and physical sciences. Classes were also open to boys, as lawyer Manuel Morais Barros sent four of his sons there and encouraged others to do so.

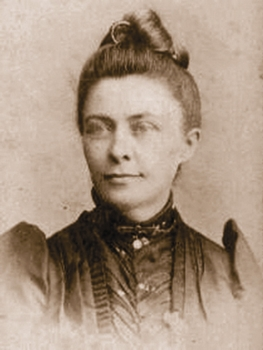
Martha Watts

Rennotte's initial qualification for the post, according to Watts, was her ability to speak French. During the 19th century, French was the universal language and access to classical literature, such as the works of Byron, Goethe, or Schiller, was only available in Brazil through French translations. Hired as a botany teacher, Rennotte's teaching methodology combined diverse elements incorporating lessons on the teachings of Auguste Comte, Jean-Jacques Rousseau, and Herbert Spencer with pedagogical theory based on Fröbel and Pestalozzi. Rennotte rejected the method of memorization previously used in Brazilian schools, instead requiring her students to give reasoned and complete answers to questions. She also taught French, anatomy, chemistry, physics, geography, and general history, using French textbooks, and promoted extracurricular activities by founding a literary society and a natural history museum. The aim of the school, since private institutions were not allowed to issue diplomas at that time, was to prepare students for higher education at normal schools or universities.

Though the methods of the Colégio Piracicabano had the support of abolitionists, masons, and progressive politicians like Prudente Morais Barros and his brother, Manuel, there were anti-liberal and ultramontanist factions which aggressively opposed the school. In 1883, the Sisters of St. Joseph, who operated the Colégio de Nossa Senhora do Patrocínio (Our Lady of Patronage College) in Itu, began a campaign to discredit the move away from traditional education for women. Because Watts was not able to speak Portuguese well, Rennotte became the spokeswoman for the Colégio Piracicabano, defending their educational methods in a series of articles written for the Gazeta de Piracicaba (Piracicaba Gazette). She also published articles in A Mensageira (The Messenger), A Província de São Paulo (The Province of São Paulo), Correio Paulistano (The Paulistan Courier), Diário Popular (The People's Daily), Município (The Municipality), and O Estado de São Paulo (The State of São Paulo). Watts acted as the administrator of the school, while in annual reports to the Methodist Woman's Missionary Society, Rennotte was given much of the credit for directing the curricula and enhancing the reputation of the Colégio Piracicabano.

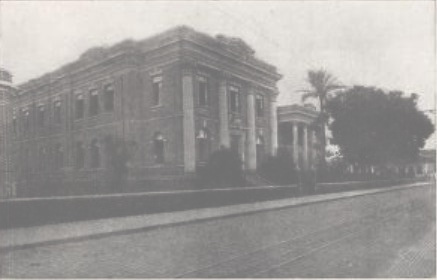
Colégio Piracicabano, ca. 1928

At the end of the 1886 term, Rennotte went abroad to study new teaching methods in the United States and France, securing textbooks and other materials for her science classes. Returning to São Paulo, in August 1887, she learned that Literary Inspector of Education, Abílio Vianna had filed a report that the school's co-education and its failure to instruct on the Catholic religion were in violation of the Education Law of 1854. The state legislature rejected the report, allowing the school to continue, and spurring Rennotte to begin offering night classes in chemistry and physics, open to any citizen who wanted to take part. In 1888, Rennotte began collaborating with Josefina Álvares de Azevedo, founder of the new feminist journal, A Família (The Family). Writing articles about women's illiteracy and customs which kept them cloistered in the home, she equated the position of women in Brazilian society to slavery, calling out the "degrading servility" of their lives. She also argued that educating women was essential to preparing children for their social roles and duties of citizenship.

=== Medicine ===
In 1889, Rennotte attended the World Fair in Paris and after briefly returning to Brazil, left in June for the United States. She enrolled in the Woman's Medical College of Pennsylvania in Philadelphia to study medicine, having received scholarship funds authorized by Prudente Morais Barros, governor-elect of the state of São Paulo. That December a legal change gave citizenship to any foreigners who were permanently residing in Brazil. She graduated in 1892, becoming the first woman from São Paulo to earn a medical degree. (Note: Rennotte was not the first woman physician in Brazil. Maria Augusta Generoso Estrela graduated with a medical degree in 1881 from the New York Medical College and Hospital for Women and in 1887 Rita Lobato was the first Brazilian woman to earn a medical degree in Brazil.) Between 1893 and 1895, Rennotte studied at the Hôtel-Dieu Hospital in Paris, completing her residency and specialization in obstetrics and gynaecology with studies in neonatology, as well as skin conditions and sexually-transmitted diseases.

Returning to Brazil in 1895, on 26 March Rennotte defended her thesis, Influência da educação da mulher sobre a medicina social (Influence of women's education on social medicine) before a jury from the Faculty of Medicine and Pharmacy of the University of Rio de Janeiro. Her thesis evaluated the impact of social practices on women's health, such as physicians' avoidance of discussing women's anatomy with their female patients and the negative effects of fashion trends such as wearing corsets and shoes that were too small. She was successful in obtaining validation of her diploma in Brazil, and within a few months, after returning to São Paulo, was admitted to the recently founded Society of Medicine and Surgery of São Paulo. Rennotte joined the staff of the Maternity Hospital of São Paulo, working as the director, as well as assisting patients both in the hospital and attending births in private homes. As director, she raised funds for the hospital and created wards to care for surgical patients and poor women who were not maternity patients. During this time, she continued to publish articles about women's issues and health for A Mensageira and was the subject of an article published in the first issue of Revista literária dedicada à mulher brasileira (Literary Magazine Dedicated to Brazilian Women). She resigned from the Maternity Hospital in June 1899 to devote her time to research and civic works.

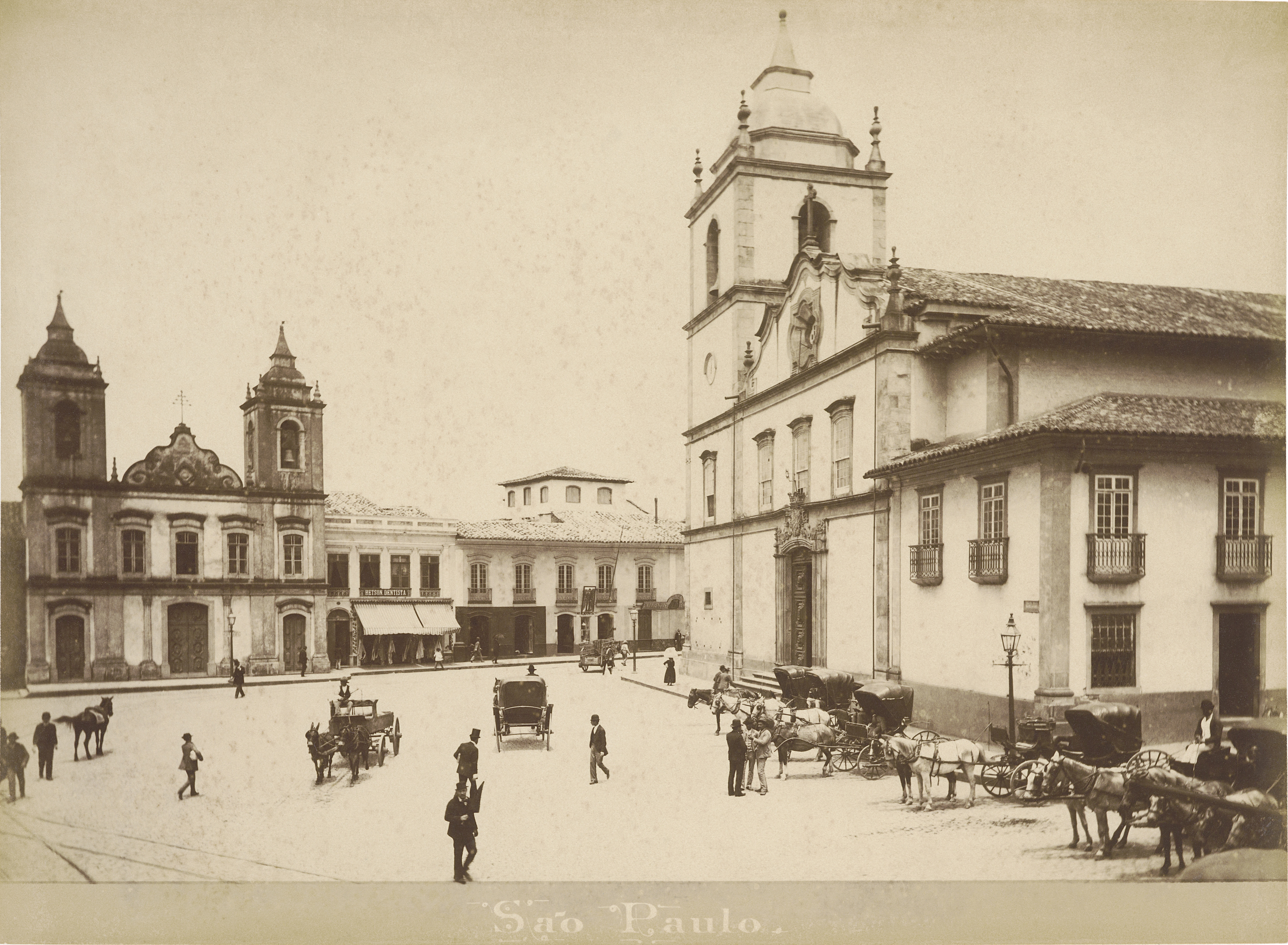
Praça da Sé, ca. 1880, by Marc Ferrez

Rennotte opened a clinic in her home near the Praça da Sé (Square of the Holy See), from which she dispensed medicines to the poor and immigrant communities. She built up a large clientele, and was invited to speak at a number of medical conferences. One of her speeches was at the 1900 class commencement at the Woman's Medical College of Pennsylvania, where she joined Emily Blackwell, Anne Walter Fearn, Anna M. Fullerton, Aletta Jacobs, and Ellen Sandelin, among others, advocating for international acceptance of women in the medical professions. In 1901, she was admitted as a member of the São Paulo branch of the Brazilian Historic and Geographic Institute and four years later became a partner in the Associação Médica Beneficente (Benevolent Medical Association) operated by Arnaldo Vieira de Carvalho, one of Brazil's most renowned physicians of the period. Also in 1905, she became a member of the Associação Feminina Beneficente e Instrutiva (Women's Benevolent and Instructive Association), an organization founded by Anália Franco, which created nurseries and schools, operated professional training workshops, and established orphanages to assist poor and working women throughout the state of São Paulo.

In 1906, Rennotte conducted research with Vieira de Carvalho at the Surgery of the Santa Casa da Misericórdia on the effects of chloroform as an anesthesthetic. She presented her findings in 1910 to the Society of Medicine and Surgery of São Paulo. Around the same time, she was commissioned by the Society of Medicine and Surgery to go to Europe to evaluate organizing the Brazilian Red Cross. After visiting Red Cross facilities in France and Germany, Rennotte returned to São Paulo and founded the São Paulo branch of the Brazilian Red Cross on 5 October 1912. The same year, she founded a Practical Nursing School in the Santa Casa de Misericórdia, which offered various classes including professional training, volunteer training, and first aid courses. Later the school moved to the headquarters of the Red Cross on Líbero Badaró Street. Also in 1912, Rennotte pressed for the creation of a convalescent home for the poor and a children's hospital. Though the convalescent home was never realized, she began a campaign asking for students and well-to-do citizens of São Paulo to donate a tostão (penny) per month to the cause. Winning approval of the plan from the State Secretary of Home Affairs, collection boxes were placed in schools throughout the state. By 1918, land had been donated in Heliópolis, 9,500 Rs$ had been raised, and construction started on the Hospital de Crianças (Infants' Hospital), the first children's hospital in the country.

During World War I, Rennotte trained Red Cross volunteers and during the 1918 influenza pandemic traveled throughout the state of São Paulo providing medical and humanitarian aid. She was awarded the Merit Cross from Prussia for her efforts, which she would donate in 1935 to the Colégio Piracicabano. In 1922 in Rio de Janeiro, she participated in the First International Feminist Congress organized by Federação Brasileira pelo Progresso Feminino, an affiliate of the International Woman Suffrage Alliance. As part of a South American tour, Carrie Chapman Catt attended the Congress and then went to São Paulo with Rennotte to help her found the Aliança Paulista pelo Sufrágio Feminino (Paulistan Alliance for Women's Suffrage). Rennotte was elected a vice president of the organization. When 5,000 civilians were injured during the São Paulo Revolt of 1924, she set up a hospital ward in Brás in the Teatro Colombo because hospitals were unable to provide enough beds. She continued to be active in scientific conferences, meetings and civic groups until 1935. In 1938, a petition was presented to the Legislative Assembly of São Paulo by journalist Mário Guastini asking for a pension for Rennotte. She was granted a lifetime sum of ₢$1,000 because of her poverty and infirmity, having lost her sight and hearing.

== Death and legacy ==
Rennotte died on 21 November 1942 in São Paulo and was buried in the Cemitério dos Protestantes. Though war coverage dominated the press, her death was recounted for several days with reminiscences written by prominent society members. She is remembered for her role in improving access to women's educational and health care opportunities, as well as women's rights to employment and citizenship. From 1882 to 1925, Rennotte published articles on benevolence, education, medicine, and women's issues. Along with other feminist writers like Narcisa Amália, Júlia Cortines, Maria Clara da Cunha Santos, Revocata Heloísa de Melo, Prisciliana Duarte de Almeida, Anália Franco, Júlia Lopes de Almeida, Zalina Rolim, and Inês Sabino, Rennotte helped develop the framework for 19th-century feminist thought in Brazil.

In the 1960s, the Hospital de Crianças in São Paulo became part of the hospital network and a pediatric training facility used by the Faculty of Medicine of the University of São Paulo, operating until 1983. In 2001, Nelly Martins Ferreira Candeias, president-elect and first woman president of the Historic and Geographic Institute of São Paulo, organized a tribute in honor of the centenary of Rennotte's admission to the organization.
