= Santa Clara Station =

Santa Clara Station may refer to:

- Santa Clara–Great America station, near the Great America amusement park in northern Santa Clara, California, United States
- Santa Clara Transit Center, in central Santa Clara, California, United States
- Santa Clara station (Metrorail), Miami, Florida, United States
- Santa Clara (São Paulo Metro), São Paulo, Brasil
- Santa Clara station (VTA), San Jose, California, United States
- Santa Clara railway station (Cuba), Santa Clara, Cuba
- Santa Clara (Mexibús), Ecatepec, Mexico
- Santa Clara (Mexicable), Ecatepec, Mexico
