= Anália Franco (São Paulo Metro) =

Future Green Line 2 Station of the São Paulo Metro

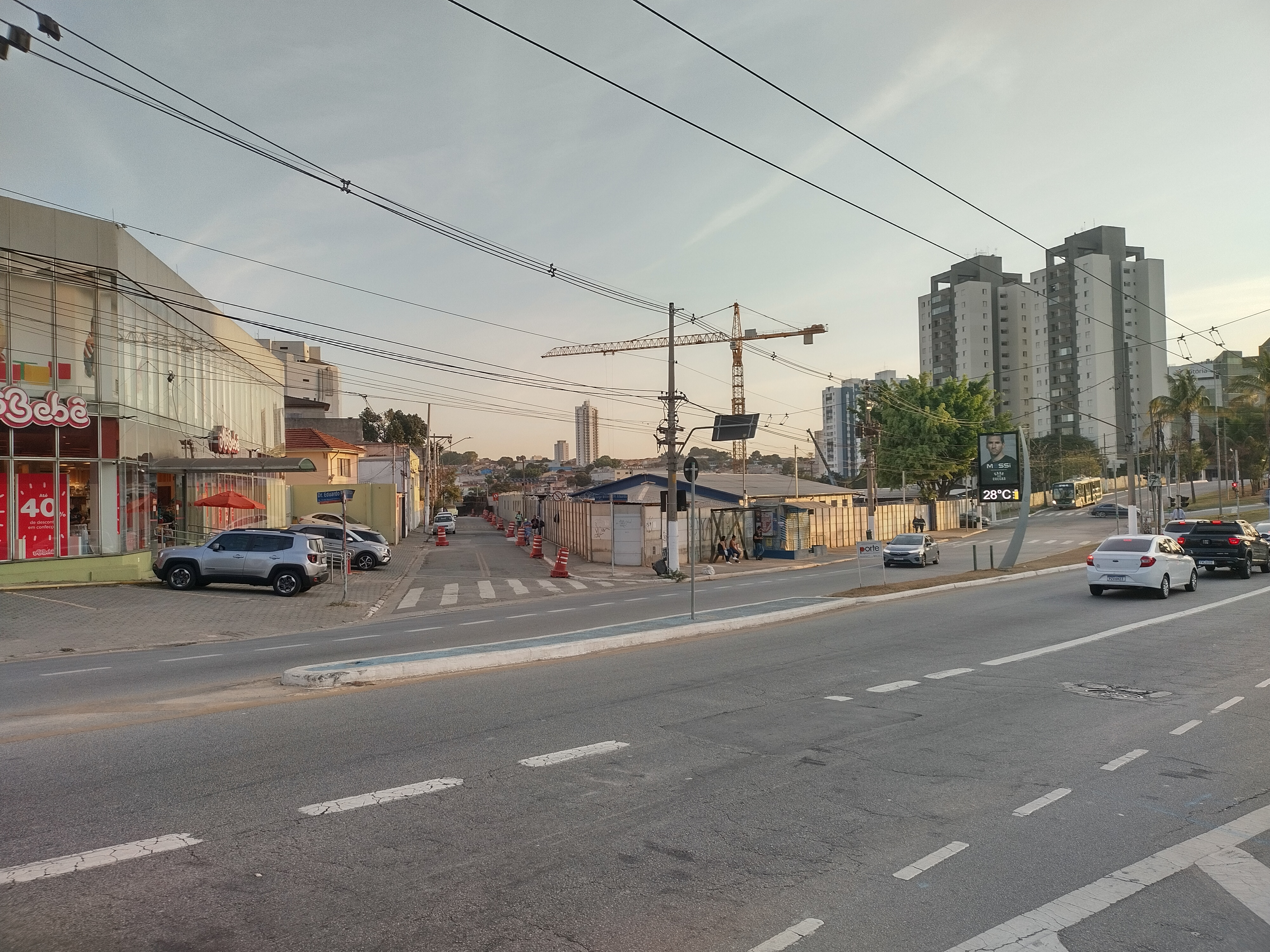
- construction site in 2022

General information
- Location: Av. Ver. Abel Ferreira × R. Eng. Cestari, Vila Formosa; São Paulo; Brazil
- Coordinates: 23.5636°S 46.5596°W
- Owner: Government of the State of São Paulo
- Operator: Companhia do Metropolitano de São Paulo
- Platforms: Side platforms

Construction
- Structure type: Underground
- Accessible: Yes

History
- Opening: 2026; 0 years ago (estimated)

Services
Preceding station	São Paulo Metro	Following station
Santa Clara towards Vila Madalena	Line 2	Vila Formosa towards Penha
Future services
Regente Feijó towards Oscar Freire	Line 16 (proposed)	Abel Ferreira towards Cidade Tiradentes
Track layout
Location

Anália Franco is a future São Paulo Metro station under construction, belonging to Line 2-Green, as part of the line expansion plan. It is estimated to be opened in 2026.

== History ==
After the opening of Jardim Anália Franco in 1968, the neighbourhood expanded slowly (even with the opening of Parque Ceret in 1975) until mid-1985, when a real estate expansion occurred with the construction of 40 buildings. This expansion attracted the construction of Anália Franco Shopping Mall and the Anália Franco campus of Cruzeiro do Sul University. Other pedestrians and vehicles traffic poles such as Vitória Hospital and a store of Leroy Merlin were built in the surroundings of the shopping mall.

Therefore, the São Paulo Metro Company (Metrô) studied the first project for the construction of a station next to the mall in the 2000s. Anália Franco station would be part of the expansion project of Line 5-Lilac towards Guarulhos Airport. Due to lack of resources, the project was archived and replaced by the Rede Essential project, which Metro proposed an expansion of Line 2-Green between Tamanduateí and Tatuapé, with Anália Franco station later renamed to Água Rasa, and now renamed again to Santa Clara. In 2009, the project was hardly modified, with the terminus station moved to Penha and the station next to the mall renamed back to Anália Franco.

The consolidation of the new project occurred in the beginning of the 2010s with the publishing of environmental impact studies, expropriation decrees and the obtaining of line of financing. Anália Franco station had its expropriation decree published on 26 July 2013, through State Decree 59387. The construction works were hired through a bidding with Mendes Junior company.

The contract was signed in September 2014, but the service order to begin the construction was delayed for almost 6 years due to the 2014 Brazilian economic crisis. The service order was issued on 17 January 2020, with Mendes Junior beginning the organization of the construction sites slowly due to the COVID-19 pandemic in São Paulo. The expansion is expected to be concluded in mid-2026.

== Toponymy ==
Anália Franco (1853–1919) was a Brazilian teacher, poet and journalist who founded schools, nursing homes, orphanages and dedicated to philanthropical works. The main was the Beneficent and Instructive Feminine Association, open in 1901, located in the center of the future neighbourhood which would be named after her. After Franco's death, the association worked regularly until 1968, when it was closed and part of the lands allotted, creating Jardim Anália Franco. In 2000, the Association building was acquired by Cruzeiro do Sul University and is currently part of the campus.
