= Methodist University of Piracicaba =

Private Brazilian university

- Universidade Metodista de Piracicaba
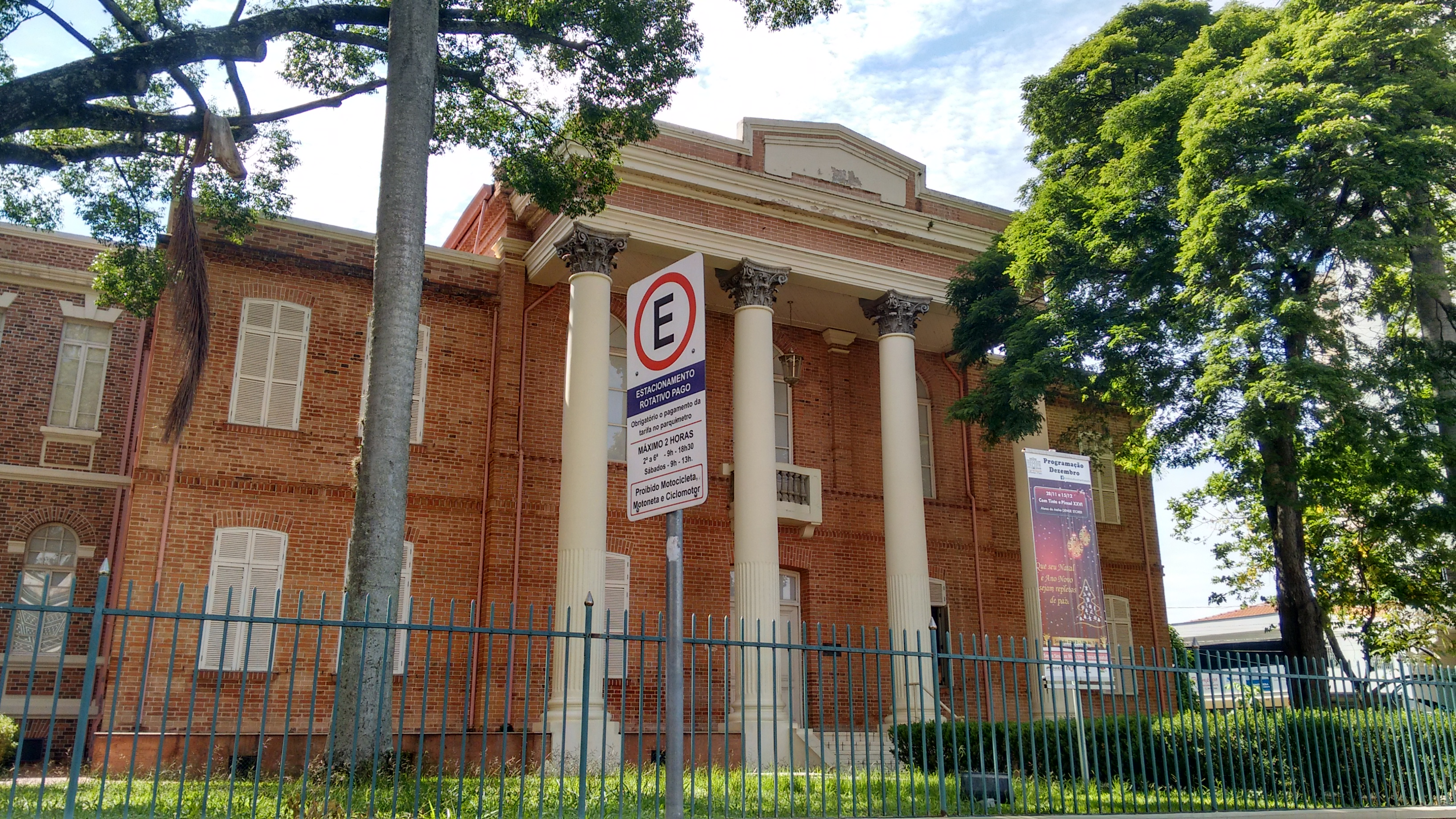
- Motto: Ide e ensinai
- Motto in English: Go and teach
- Type: Private university
- Established: 1975
- Religious affiliation: Methodist Church in Brazil
- Rector: Ismael Forte Valentin
- Location: Piracicaba, Sao Paulo, Brazil
- Website: unimep.edu.br

The Methodist University of Piracicaba (Portuguese: Universidade Metodista de Piracicaba), also known as Unimep, is a Brazilian private higher education institution located in the state of São Paulo.

The university offers teaching, research, and outreach activities, in diverse knowledge areas. Unimep was founded in 1964 as a set of individually accredited faculties, and was granted university status in 1975, becoming the first Methodist university in Latin America. The institution is sponsored by Instituto Educacional Piracicabano (IEP) and concentrates its activities in a main campus located in Taquaral, Piracicaba, and in Lins.

In a 2016 report by Instituto Nacional de Estudos e Pesquisas Educacionais Anísio Teixeira, a quasi-autonomous non-governmental organization under the Ministry of Education responsible for the quality assessment of higher education institutions in Brazil, Unimep obtained a general degree-course index (IGC, Índice Geral de Cursos, in Portuguese) of 2.6478 (on a 0-5 scale) and was graded at level 3 (on a 1-5 scale) as a result of the assessment of 40 degree courses. In its 2016 assessment, Guia do Estudante, a Brazilian university guide, ranked Unimep as the second best private university of the interior of the state of Sao Paulo, and 14th on the global ranking of the state.

== History ==
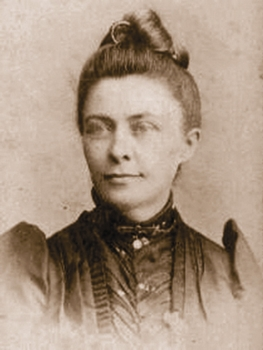
Missionary Martha Watts, founder of Colégio Piracicabano, from which Unimep was born.

The history of Unimep dates back to 1881, when American missionary Martha Watts founded in Piracicaba the first Methodist school of Brazil, Colégio Piracicabano. In 1964, the school started to offer higher education courses in Economy, Administration and Accounting, referred as Integrated Faculties. With that expansion, in 1975, the Ministry of Education recognized Unimep as a university.

In 1980, UNIMEP sponsored and hosted the 32nd congress of the National Union of Students, and elected Aldo Rebelo, linked to the Communist Party of Brazil, as its president. The then rector of UNIMEP interceded personally before the minister of justice of the Brazilian government, at the time under a military dictatorship, to allow the student mobilization. The congress gathered 4,000 students in Piracicaba and allowed for the restructuring of the National Union of Students.

== Structure and academic offer ==
Unimep is structured into degree courses focusing in the fields of health sciences, communication, humanities, law and business administration: physical education, nursing, physiotherapy, veterinary medicine, nutrition, odontology, cinema and audiovisual, psychology, law, administration, and logistics.

== International relations ==
Unimep has signed partnership agreements with universities in countries all around the world, such as Germany, Angola, Argentina, Belgium, Chile, Colombia, South Korea, Costa Rica, Cuba, Spain, United States, Finland, United Kingdom, Italy, Japan, Mexico, Mozambique, Paraguay, Portugal, Taiwan, Ukraine, and Uruguay. The university is also an active member of the International Association of Methodist Schools, Colleges and Universities (IAMSCU), whose presidency it has occupied on several occasions.
