= Orfanato (São Paulo Metro) =

Future railway station in São Paulo, Brazil

General information
- Location: R. do Orfanato × R. Dr. Sanareli, Vila Prudente; São Paulo; Brazil
- Coordinates: 23°34′40″S 46°34′36″W
- Owner: Government of the State of São Paulo
- Operator: Companhia do Metropolitano de São Paulo
- Platforms: Side platforms

Construction
- Structure type: Underground
- Accessible: Yes

History
- Opening: 2026; 0 years ago (estimated)

Services
Preceding station	São Paulo Metro	Following station
Vila Prudente towards Vila Madalena	Line 2	Santa Clara towards Penha
Track layout
Location

Orfanato is a metro station under construction in São Paulo Metro Line 2-Green. It is part of the expansion project of Line 2 between Vila Prudente and Dutra (Guarulhos), estimated to be opened in mid-2026.

== History ==
The first project for a station in Rua do Orfanato was made in the mid-2000s as part of Companhia do Metropolitano de São Paulo project "Rede Distributiva". In the end of the 2000s, the project was modified, but kept Orfanato station. It was deepened in 2012, when it was publicly presented. After that, the State Government published the expropriation Executive Orders necessary for the construction of the station, including Orfanato. Divided in 8 lots, the expansion project was bid in September 2014. Orfanato station is part of Lot 3 (next to Água Rasa station and its respective ventilation pits), won by builder Mendes Júnior. Due to the 2014 Brazilian economic crisis, the service order was suspended between 2015 and 2019, and only demolition service of the expropriated areas were made, which began in September 2017. The long stoppage period caused the areas to cause urban degradation in the surroundings of the future stations, increasing the number of complaint from local residents and raising expectation in the construction.

Besides that, the implantation and architectural project were developed during this period by Infra7 Engenharia and Mendes Júnior.

After almost 6 years suspended, the service order was given on 17 January 2020.

== Toponymy ==
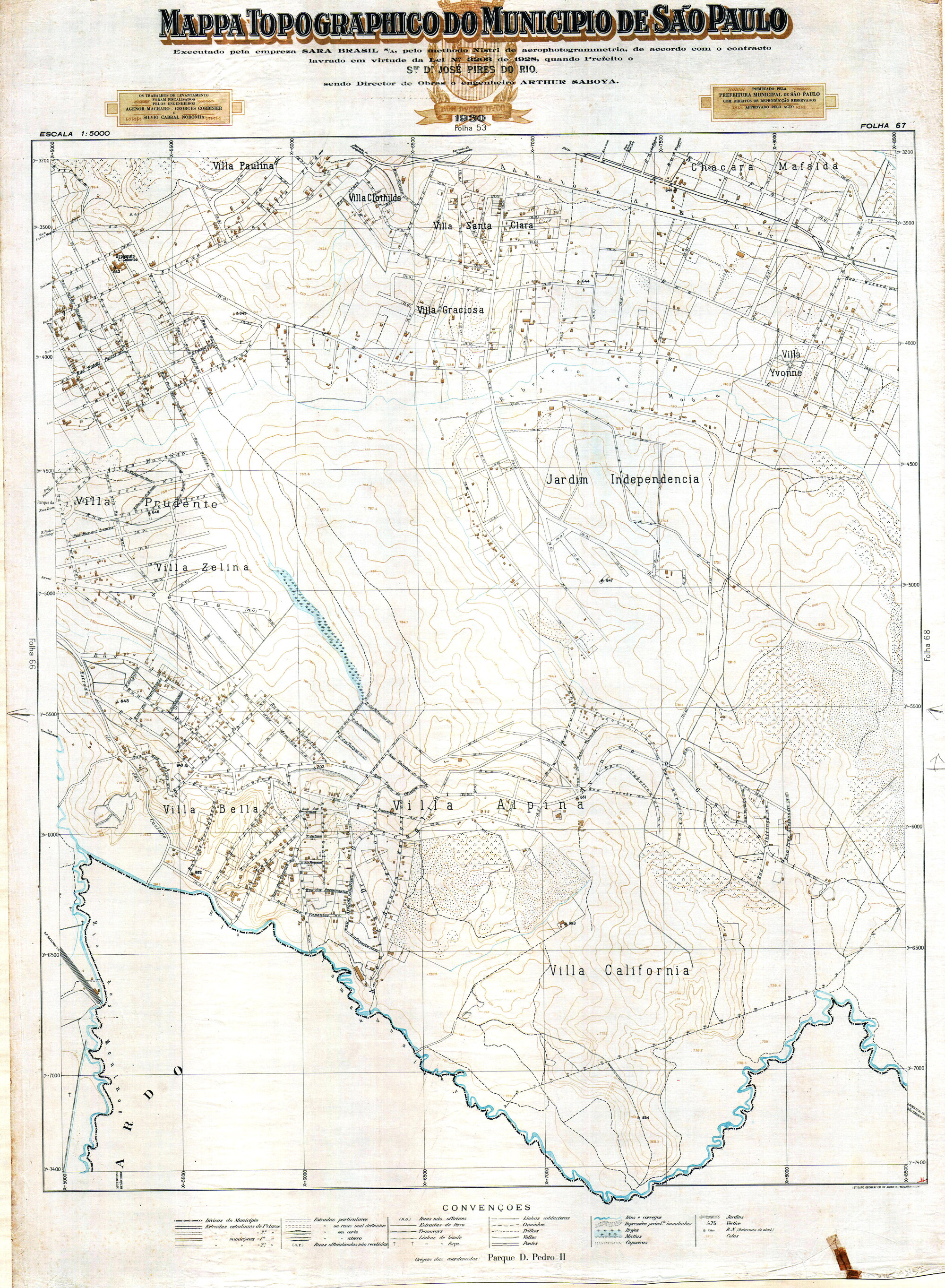
Topographic Map of Sector 67 of the city of São Paulo (SARA, 1930). Cristóvão Colombo Orphanage (Vila Prudente) is located in the upper-left corner.

After beneficent campaigns made in São Paulo, on 15 February 1895, Italian priest José Marchetti (1869-1896) created Cristóvão Colombo Orphanage. Some time later, Marchetti projected the implantation of a second unit in the recent-founded borough of Vila Prudente to split up boys and girls. The construction began in 1896 and, after a long time of stoppage and lack of resources, it was concluded in 1904. Cristóvão Colombo Orphanage of Vila Prudente was opened on 5 August 1904. Because it was a large building in that block, it became a geographic and social reference point. The street of the allotment was named by local residents as "Rua do Orfanato", name officialized by Municipal Executive Order N° 972, of 24 August 1916. The Orphanage was managed for many years by priest Marchetti's sister, Sister Assunta Marchetti (1871-1948). After his death, Vila Prudente Orphanage was renamed after her (Sister Assunta Marchetti House). Currently, it is a mixed shelter, receiving children and teenagers in situation of social vulnerability forwarded by the Judiciary.

The toponymic study made by Companhia do Metropolitano de São Paulo named the proposed station "Orfanato", as it fits the four naming requirements: popularity, metropolitan scale, content characteristic and shape characteristic. The location of Sister Assunta Marchetti House (old Vila Prudente Orphanage), less than 100 m (330 ft) from the proposed station, contributed decisively for the naming.
