= Rita Lobato =

Brazilian physician

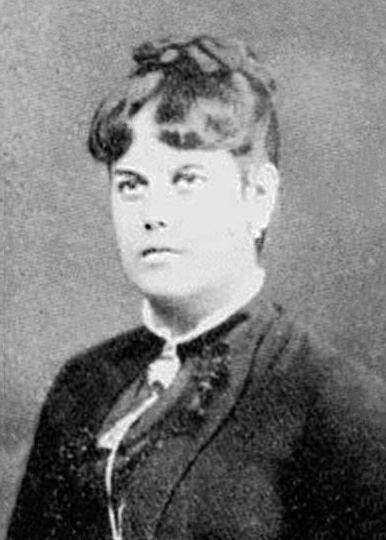
Rita Lobato

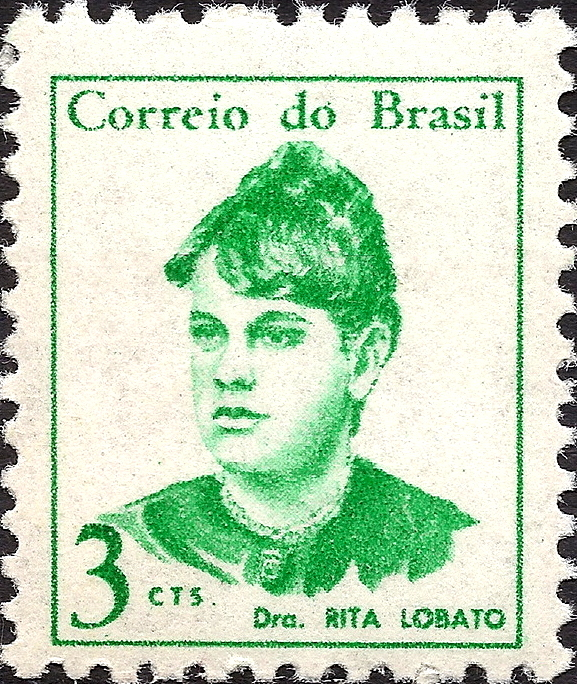
Rita Lobato on a 1967 stamp

Rita Lobato Velho Lopes (June 7, 1866, in Rio Grande – January 6, 1954, in Rio Pardo) was the first woman to earn a degree in Brazil to practice medicine. She was the second Brazilian woman physician, following Maria Augusta Generoso Estrela, who earned a degree from the New York Medical College and Hospital for Women in 1881. Lobato received her degree in 1887 from the Faculty of Medicine of Bahia. Her initial enrollment caused debate, with some people arguing that women had brains too small to understand medicine or that a female doctor would never find a husband, although others were in favor of her entrance and the Echo das Damas saw her as an example for Brazilian girls. She did, in fact, marry and practised medicine for several years.

== Early life and education ==
Lobato was born in the city of Rio Grande, in Rio Grande do Sul, on June 7, 1866 (some sources say June 9). She spent the early years of her life at various locations in the municipality of Pelotas in Rio Grande do Sul. Her father, Francisco Lobato Lopes, worked with the production and marketing of dried, salted meat, which meant that the family often moved. She had twelve siblings and her mother, Rita Carolina Velho Lopes, was to die in childbirth.

Lobato started school at the age of five and had completed primary school by the very early age of nine. At an early stage she had expressed a desire to become a doctor, and this was reinforced by her mother’s death, when she decided that she wanted to specialize in obstetrics. In 1884 her father moved the family to Rio de Janeiro state so that she and one of her brothers, Antônio, could attend the faculty of medicine at the Federal University of Rio de Janeiro. There were two other female students, Ermelinda Lopes de Vasconcelos and Antonieta César Dias. Their ability to gain admission to the university had been made possible by an imperial decree passed in 1879 that prohibited discrimination against women in higher education.

Her studies were interrupted at the end of the first year by a conflict between students, including her brother, and the institution's rector. The cause of the episode, which resulted in physical aggression and heated discussions between those involved, was a reform that made it possible to move exams forward, among other changes that some students considered harmful. In order to protect his children against retaliation for what had happened, her father took his family to Salvador do Bahia, where she enrolled at the school of medicine at the Federal University of Bahia, from where she graduated at the age of 21, having completed a six-year course in three years. Ironically, this was made possible by taking advantage of the rule that had caused the conflict between her brother and the Federal University of Rio de Janeiro. With a thesis on the caesarean section, she became the first woman to graduate in medicine in Brazil.

== Career ==
Upon graduating, Lobato returned to Rio Grande do Sul with her father. She began to work as a doctor in private practice, with a mostly female clientele. In 1889 she married Antônio Maria Amaro de Freitas, who she had known before she left for university, and their daughter was born a year later. They then moved to Porto Alegre and she began to receive patients of all social classes in her home. In 1910 she resumed her studies, spending five months in Buenos Aires, Argentina to learn about new developments in medicine. On returning to Brazil, she continued to work for both rich and poor in Capivari do Sul, Rio Pardo and surrounding areas in Rio Grande do Sul. She decided to retire in 1925, after her daughter’s marriage. The equipment used in her former clinic was donated to the Santa Casa de Misericordia Hospital in Porto Alegre.

== Support for female suffrage ==
Lobato’s husband died in September 1926. Following his death she sought new ways of occupying herself. Under the influence of biologist and activist Bertha Lutz, she began to support the fight for women's right to vote, becoming an integral part of the cause in Brazil. Lobato joined the Libertador Party, and ran for the position of councilor in Rio Pardo in 1934, two years after women were allowed to vote, becoming the first woman to be a councilor in the city.

== Death ==
Lobato suffered a stroke in 1940. She died in Rio Pardo on January 6, 1954.

== Recognition ==
On June 7, 2024, the 158th anniversary of her birth, she was the subject of a Google Doodle on the Brazilian website of the Google search engine.
