= Martha Watts =

American Methodist missionary in Brazil

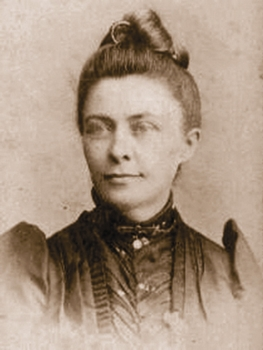
- Born: Martha Hite Watts; February 13, 1848; Bardstown, Kentucky, U.S.
- Died: December 30, 1909 (aged 61); Louisville, Kentucky, U.S.
- Resting place: Cave Hill Cemetery; Louisville, Kentucky, U.S.
- Other names: Martha H. Watts, Mattie H. Watts
- Occupations: educator, missionary
- Years active: 1881–1909

Martha Watts (February 13, 1848 – December 30, 1909) was an American missionary and school teacher who established four educational facilities in Brazil. Educated in Kentucky at the Louisville Normal School, she was in the first graduating class in the early 1870s and became a teacher, working in the public schools. After joining the Broadway Methodist Church in 1874, Watts joined a youth missionary society and founded a Sunday school class. In 1881, after applying to the Women's Board of Foreign Missions, she was accepted as the second woman from the United States to act as a foreign missionary and was the first woman to be sent to Brazil.

Arriving in the state of São Paulo in 1881, Watts' mission was to establish a school in Piracicaba. Within months, though she only had one student, Watts had opened the Colégio Piracicabano and began by recruiting a French teacher, Marie Rennotte, in 1882. At the time, most educational materials had been translated into French, as it was the universal language of education. The two women worked together to design an innovative co-educational learning environment, which offered courses in languages, literature, mathematics, philosophy, and the natural and physical sciences. Though criticized by conservative sectors of society and the Catholic Church, Watts gained powerful supporters, including prominent progressive politicians, lawyers, masons, and abolitionists. By the 1890s, the school method and curricula had gained wide support, the student body had grown substantially, and their methods were being implemented throughout the state.

Watts remained at the Colégio Piracicabano for 14 years and then established three other schools in the states of Minas Gerais and Rio de Janeiro. Failing health led to her retirement in 1909 and a return to Louisville, Kentucky, where she died at the end of that year. She is remembered in Brazil as the pioneer in bringing Methodist education to the country. An annex of the Colégio Piracicabano is named in her honor, as is the cultural center of Piracicaba, one of several facilities which bear her name or pay homage to her role in the development of a modern educational system.

== Early life ==
Martha Hite Watts was born on February 13, 1848, in Bardstown, Kentucky, to Elizabeth Curtis/Curtiss (née Pixley/Paxley) and Elijah Searcy Watts. The ninth of 12 children, she received her early education from her older siblings. Around the age of nine, she enrolled in the Bardstown Female Institute of the Methodist Episcopal Church. Her father was a well-known attorney and soon moved the family to Louisville, where Watts became engaged. Her fiancé was killed in the Civil War and when the war ended she continued her studies at the Louisville Normal School. The school opened in 1871 and Watts was in the first graduating class.

== Career ==
=== Early career ===
Watts immediately began teaching in the public school system. In 1874, she joined the Methodist Church in Louisville and began regularly attending Sunday school. By 1877, she had established a youth missionary society at the Broadway Methodist Church. When asked by Mary Helm if she would be interested in missionary work in Brazil, Watts submitted an application to the Women's Board of Foreign Missions and was accepted in 1881, becoming the first woman to be sent to Brazil by the Women's Board and the second woman, after Lochie Rankin, who served in China from 1878, to be employed by the Women's Board. In May 1881, Watts arrived in Rio de Janeiro in the company of James L. Kennedy, James W. Koger and his wife Frances (née Smith), and John James Ransom. Her mission was to establish a school in Piracicaba in the state of São Paulo. While Koger and his wife were to found a church there, Kennedy and Ransom were to establish a church in Rio de Janeiro. By July, Watts had founded a Sunday school and the church was organized by September 11. Founding the school proved more difficult as Watts, who was not fluent in Portuguese, had to convince her neighbors to send their children to school. She also struggled to find a suitable property to rent.

=== Colégio Piracicabano ===
On September 13, 1881, Watts opened the Colégio Piracicabano, having rented a space capable of serving 18 students. Only one pupil, Maria Escobar, was in attendance, as parents were reluctant to move their children in the last quarter of the year. She was criticized for her haste in trying to open the school so quickly with three teachers for the sole student, but pressure to succeed when two previous attempts to establish a Methodist mission school had failed, caused Watts to forge ahead. Watts did not speak French and neither teacher Mary Newman, nor Francis Joseph Christopher Schneider, who taught Portuguese, were prepared to teach classes in the French language, considered the universal language at that time. For students to study the classics in Brazil, they had to use French translations. This made securing a teacher who spoke French essential for the success of the school. Watts and Rev. Ransom, wrote several letters to the Women's Board asking them to secure an American teacher who spoke French, without success. On February 23, 1882, Ransom reported to the Board that he had found a "French woman" with teaching degrees who had accepted an offer of employment. Though the school term had already begun with 13 students, Marie Rennotte, a Belgian teacher, did not join the staff until early March.

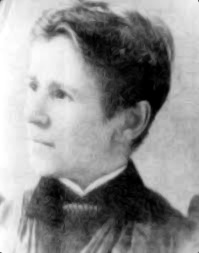
Marie Rennotte, circa 1892

Rennotte and Watts worked together to establish the educational vision of the school. Primarily Watts administrated the institution and Rennotte directed creation of the curricula and enhancing the reputation of the Colégio Piracicabano, becoming its spokeswoman owing to Watts' limited ability with Portuguese. Watts' approach to education was founded on Methodist ideology, which promoted a separation of church and state, individual and religious freedom, exploration of science and technology and democratic reforms aimed at producing faithful Christian servants to the nation. Rennotte's method was based upon the European philosophy and pedagogical theories of scholars like Fröbel and Pestalozzi. Together, they sought to implement innovative principles for women's education. The typical education available at the time prepared girls for domestic and social spheres and indoctrinated them into Catholicism. Providing a boarding school for girls, championing co-education and gender equality, Colégio Piracicabano offered a well-rounded curriculum, including courses in languages, literature, mathematics, philosophy, and natural and physical sciences. Classes were also open to boys, as lawyer Manuel de Moraes Barros sent four of his children there and encouraged others to do so.

Though their curricula was approved of by progressive factions of society, the conservative elements, and specifically the Catholic Church, were harsh critics of Watts and the education provided by Colégio Piracicabano. Nonetheless, by 1883, the enrollment had reached 30 students with the support of abolitionists, (Note: Watts was an abolitionist and soon after her arrival in Brazil, she bought the slave Flora Blumer de Toledo and manumitted her. Blumer in turn became an employee of Watts and worked at the Colégio Piracicabano until 1892, when she died.) masons, and progressive politicians like Prudente Morais Barros (brother of Manuel), who would become governor of São Paulo and President of Brazil. He would later attempt to use the methods adopted for the Colégio Piracicabano as the model for the state's educational system and as governor, offered Watts a position as Minister of Education, to assist in founding a normal school in the state and reform education, though she declined. With growing enrollment, Watts embarked on the construction of a new school building, which was opened in 1884. Wanting the building ready for the start of the new school year, both she and Rennotte were closely involved in the building project to ensure both functionality and hygienic conditions as a basis for a good learning environment.

Taking a leave of absence as was typical for missionaries every five years, Watts spent much of the year 1886 in the United States. In her absence, the school was run by Mary Bruce, as Rennotte was also abroad gathering textbooks and class materials in Europe. Seizing the opportunity, in 1887 the Literary Inspector of Education, Abílio Vianna, filed a report that the school's co-education and its failure to instruct on the Catholic religion were in violation of the Education Laws of 1851 and 1869, and demanded that boys over age 10 be removed from admittance and that a teacher be hired for Catholic instruction. Reaction was swift, with prominent local newspapers and the press in Rio de Janeiro, publishing denouncements of the inspector's actions. When Bruce was subpoenaed, she responded that she would not comply and would not reject students on the basis of their religion or sex. In the end, the state legislature called for Vianna's resignation, allowing the school to continue with their programs. Watts returned after her year at home and resumed her post as director.

=== Other schools in Brazil ===
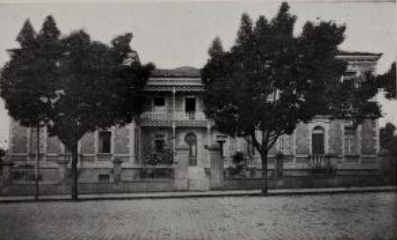
Colégio Izabela Hendrix, circa 1928

After 14 years at the Colégio Piracicabano, in 1895, Watts was transferred to Petrópolis with instructions to build a new boarding school there. In effect, it meant starting her career over, building the Colégio Americano (American College) from scratch. The girls' boarding school began with three students and rapidly the enrollment expanded to 50 from some of the most prominent families in the area. As the school was somewhat remote and in the mountains, it gave relief from the heat and epidemics that often occurred in Rio de Janeiro at the time, allowing diplomats and officials in the nearby capital to send their daughters there for safety.

Watts remained at the school until 1900 and the following year took her pentennial leave, returning to the United States. Back in Brazil in 1902, she was assigned to Colégio Mineiro (Miner's College) in Juiz de Fora. She remained at the temporary location for two years while a building was secured for a new Methodist school in Belo Horizonte. In 1904, she inaugurated the Colégio Izabela Hendrix (Izabela Hendrix College) in the capital city of Minas Gerais with five students, but had over 60 enroll for the following year. In 1905, Blanche Howell was hired as Watts' assistant and the two worked together on the school's establishment. In 1907, Watts returned to Colégio Piracicabano for the dedication of an annex to the school which was named in her honor. Though the cornerstone was laid in 1907, the Martha Watts Annex was not completed until 1912. Suffering from ill-health, Watts returned to the United States in early 1909.

== Death and legacy ==
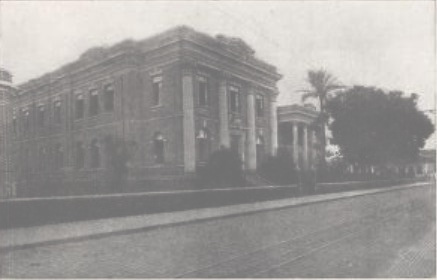
Colégio Piracicabano, ca. 1928 (now the Martha Watts Cultural Center)

Watts fell when stepping out of a carriage in Greenville, Kentucky, in the spring of 1909 and never recovered from the complications of breaking her hip. She died on December 30, 1909, at her brother W. O. Watts' home and was buried at Cave Hill Cemetery on January 2, 1910. A memorial service for her life and work was hosted by the Methodist Missionary Society on January 5, 1910, in Louisville. Watts is recognized as the pioneer who brought Methodist education to Brazil and for her role in the development of a modern educational system in the country.

In 1947, the Escola Normal Livre Miss Martha Watts (Miss Martha Watts Free Normal School) was established next door to the Colégio Piracicabano. It operated until 1970, when the government abolished normal school training. The Colégio Piracicabano was eventually transformed into the Methodist University of Piracicaba in 1975, after having expanded its curricula to offer tertiary courses in 1964. There is a bronze bust of Watts in the hall of the Colégio Izabela Hendrix, recognizing her role in founding the school. The Centro Cultural 'Martha Watts' (Martha Watts Cultural Center) located on Rua Boa Morte in Piracicaba was established in 2003 and pays homage to her "ações que visavam transformar as pessoas, seus costumes, seus hábitos, suas crenças levando-as ao desenvolvimento, tanto intelectual como espiritual" (actions aimed at transforming people, their customs, their habits, their beliefs—leading them to both intellectual and spiritual development).
