= Maria Augusta Generoso Estrela =

Brazilian physician

- Born: April 10, 1860; Rio de Janeiro, Brazil
- Died: April 18, 1946 (aged 86); Rio de Janeiro
- Education: New York Medical College and Hospital for Women
- Known for: First Brazilian woman to obtain a medical degree
- Medical career
- Profession: Doctor

Maria Augusta Generoso Estrela (1860 –1946) was the first Brazilian woman to graduate in medicine, receiving her degree from the New York Medical College and Hospital for Women in New York state in 1881. In 1882, she returned to Brazil and started a career of providing medical care to women and children.

== Early life and education ==
Estrela was born in Rio de Janeiro on 10 April 1860 to Maria Luiza and Albino Augusto Generoso Estrela, a wealthy merchant who traded in medicines. Both were Portuguese. She received a basic education at the Colégio Brasileiro boarding school at Rua das Laranjeiras in Rio de Janeiro. In April 1873, just after turning thirteen, she accompanied her father on a business trip to Europe. They disembarked in the Portuguese capital Lisbon and remained there for a month before boarding another vessel to Funchal, on the island of Madeira, where Estrela stayed for six months while her father was travelling in England on business and attending the 1873 Vienna World's Fair. She studied at the Collegio de Villa-Real in Funchal.

In November 1873 they began their return journey aboard the steamer Flamsteed. En route the steamer collided with the British battleship HMS Bellerophon. The steamer would eventually sink but, initially, the captain refused to seek assistance from the British ship and it was only after being begged to do so by Estrela, who had been helping injured passengers and crew, that he sent a distress signal. Passengers and crew and their possessions were transferred to the Bellerophon and, subsequently, to another Portuguese vessel, which delivered them safely to Rio de Janeiro. She disembarked dressed as a British sailor, having been given the uniform by the captain of the Belleerophon.

She then returned to Colégio Brasileiro. While reading magazines and periodicals from the US, she noted a story about a young woman who studied medicine in New York. At the time, Brazilian colleges did not allow women to enrol and so she asked her father to send her abroad so she could obtain medical qualifications and then return to practice in Brazil. She left Brazil for New York on 26 March 1875, with her trip being reported in several Brazilian newspapers. The New York Herald reported her arrival on 23 April. She had initially enrolled at a college in Oswego County, New York, where she remained for a year. However, in September 1876, she sought to transfer to another school, the New York Medical College and Hospital for Women in Valhalla, also in New York state. This institution, founded in 1863 by the physician Clemence Sophia Harned Lozier (1813–1888), professor of women's diseases and children, was one of the first North American medical schools to admit women. Estrela later published a short biography of Lozier.

However, Estrela was still below the minimum age of 18 years for entry into the college and was thus disbarred. She requested to speak in her defence before a Commission of that institution and on 12 October 1876, she argued that she had come from a country that did not allow her access to study medicine but that she had sufficient knowledge to be admitted on an exceptional basis. The commission scheduled new entrance exams for her, which she took and passed with distinction, enrolling on 17 October, at the age of 16, and receiving an ovation at the enrolment ceremony. She initially stayed at the home of a teacher, Clara C. Plimpton, and later at the home of Lozier.

In 1876, the company owned by Cyrenius Chapin Bristol that marketed "Bristol's Extract of Sarsaparilla", for which Estrela's father was an agent in Brazil, went bankrupt, resulting in his inability to continue supporting his daughter's studies. Alerted by media reports, this came to the attention of Emperor D. Pedro II who, as he had done with other scientists and artists, granted a scholarship to Estrela. These resources, which were sent through the Brazilian consul in New York, Salvador de Mendonça, were adequate to guarantee her graduation from the course. The emperor clearly had an interest in women wishing to pursue medical careers. He opened university education to women in 1879 and in 1888 he chaired the Evaluation Panel that awarded a medical degree to Ermelinda Lopes de Vasconcelos, the second women to be awarded such a degree by a Brazilian university.

Estrela was able to complete her studies in New York in May 1980, but she was not of the age required by the college's statute to receive the diploma. She then waited two years, serving as an intern in several hospitals. She also suffered from some medical problems, most notably because of an accident with a scalpel while carrying out an autopsy, which led to long and painful treatment.

Even before her return she was attracting attention in Brazil. In May 1879, the periodical Echo das Damas, which was devoted to the critical, recreational, scientific and literary interests of women, and was published in Rio de Janeiro, began issuing, in serial format, a biography of Estrela, in six editions. This told of the first years of her life, her first studies, her trip to Europe and the period she spent in Funchal. She was also featured in other magazines and papers and in the window of Livraria Academia, an academic bookshop in Rio de Janeiro.

Her father died in June 1880, victim of a stroke. Several of his friends then donated funds for her to complete her studies in New York. While waiting for her degree in 1881, she joined a college friend, Josefa Agueda Felisbella Mercedes de Oliveira, to open an illustrated journal, A Mulher, which they said was "consecrated to the interests and rights of Brazilian women". Six issues were published and it attracted favourable attention both in the US and Brazil. When receiving her degree in 1881, becoming the first Brazilian woman with a medical degree, she was nominated as class valedictorian, and was awarded a gold medal for her performance during the course and for her thesis entitled "Skin Diseases". With the emperor's authorization, she then remained in New York for another year to practice medicine, mainly attending births and carrying out obstetric consultations.

== Return to Brazil and career ==
Upon disembarking in Rio de Janeiro, she was received by the emperor, who advised her to dedicate her career to serving women. After her diploma was validated by the Faculty of Medicine of Rio de Janeiro (now the Federal University of Rio de Janeiro), which involved her taking further exams, she began to practice. In 1884, she met the pharmacist Antonio Costa Moraes, a graduate of the University of Leipzig, who had been a pharmacist in the Brazilian army. They married in 1886 and had five children. Estrela had initially worked in her own office but to overcome her husband's jealousy she moved to his pharmacy, where she set up a small receiving room, serving mainly women and children.

Estrela spoke out on several occasions against slavery, which continued to be practiced in Brazil, having joined the Clube do Cupim, an abolitionist Club based in Recife and addressed a meeting of that club at the Santa Isabel Theater in Recife. Her husband died in 1904 (1908?), which forced her to reduce her opening hours so she could dedicate herself to her children, but she kept the small room in the pharmacy open where she attended to more urgent cases and prescribed medicines. She was often called upon to discuss a difficult-to-diagnose case among colleagues.

== Death ==
While talking to her family, Estrela died suddenly at her home in the city of Rio de Janeiro, at the age of 86, on 18 April 1946.

== Legacy ==
Through the widespread media coverage she received, Estrela inspired young women with the dream of graduating in medicine. Today her name is honoured as the patron of Chair 64 at the São Paulo Academy of Medicine, and in Poços de Caldas in Minas Gerais state, Porto Alegre in Rio Grande do Sul and Bangu, Rio de Janeiro there are streets named after her. On 8 March 1999, the Board of Directors of the Rio de Janeiro City Council awarded her the Pedro Ernesto "Post Mortem" Medal of Merit. Based on a survey of doctors carried out in Brazil in 2020, together with a study of registrations of new doctors, women now account for almost 50% of all doctors in the country.
