= Ermelinda Lopes de Vasconcelos =

Brazilian physician

- Born: September 23, 1866; Porto Alegre, Brazil
- Died: 1952; Niterói, Brazil
- Education: Federal University of Rio de Janeiro
- Known for: First women to obtain a medicine degree in Rio de Janeiro state
- Medical career
- Profession: Doctor
- Field: Gynaecologist; obstetrician

Ermelinda Lopes de Vasconcelos (1866 – 1952) was a Brazilian doctor. She was the second female doctor to graduate from university in Brazil and the first in Rio de Janeiro state. As an obstetrician she is said to have been present at over ten thousand births.

== Early life and education ==
Vasconcelos was born in Porto Alegre in Rio Grande do Sul state on 23 September 1866, the daughter of Joaquim Lopes de Vasconcelos and Firmiana dos Santos. At the age of eight, she moved with her family to Rio de Janeiro, where her father worked as a bookkeeper at the Companhia de Navegação Fluvial (River Navigation Company).

At the time, one of the only ways for girls to remain in the education system after primary school was to study to become teachers. Vasconcelos graduated from the Escola Normal de Niterói (Niterói Normal School), a teacher-training school, in 1881 but had no real intention to become a teacher. In 1884, after much pressure from his daughter, her father consented for her to enrol at the Faculty of Medicine of Rio de Janeiro. Her ability to gain admission to the university had been made possible by an imperial decree only passed in 1879 that prohibited discrimination against women in higher education. There were two other women taking the same course, Rita Lobato and Antonieta César Dias.

Vasconcelos obtained a degree in medicine in 1888 with a thesis entitled Clinical forms of meningitis in children: differential diagnosis". An interesting aspect of her thesis hearing was that the evaluation panel was chaired by Emperor D. Pedro II. She became the first woman to graduate as a doctor in Rio de Janeiro and the second in Brazil, after Lobato, who had begun her studies in Rio de Janeiro but transferred to the Faculty of Medicine of Bahia and completed her studies in 1887.

== Criticism ==
Women studying medicine and becoming doctors encountered considerable hostility. While not necessarily representing the majority view, after her graduation there were several letters of complaint in local newspapers and in medical journals. For example, Sílvio Romero, a poet, writer, and historian, who would later become a member of the elite Academia Brasileira de Letras (Brazilian Academy of Letters), wrote: "Doctor, rest assured that your macho feet will not tread in my home." Ironically, Romero would later ask Vasconcelos to attend his wife for the delivery of their child. He even asked for a discount and to pay by instalments, to which she allegedly showed him a newspaper clipping of his letter and said: "You will pay me dearly, and in one go!"

== Career ==
Vasconcelos married Dr. Alberto de Sá, a gynaecologist and obstetrician, in 1889. She then continued her studies in 1900 in France, England, and Germany. Like her husband she also concentrated on gynaecology and obstetrics during her career and it is said that she was present at more than ten thousand births. She participated in the founding of the Medical-Surgical Association of Rio de Janeiro in 1921. Vasconcelos was also one of the pioneers of the Brazilian feminist movement, having founded, in 1922, with Bertha Lutz, the Liga Fluminense para o Progresso Feminino (The Rio de Janeiro State League for Women's Advancement).

== Death ==
Vasconcelos died in Niterói in 1952.

== Legacy ==
Based on a survey of doctors carried out in Brazil in 2020, together with a study of registrations of new doctors, women now account for almost 50% of all doctors in the country.
