= Anália Franco =

Brazilian educator

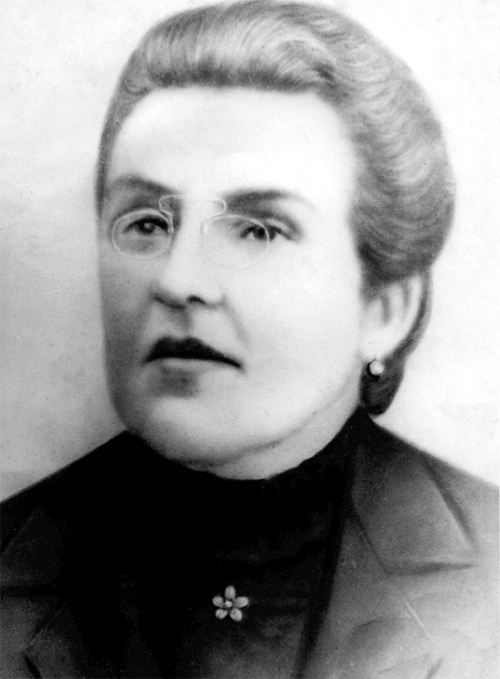
- Born: Anália Emília Franco Bastos; 1 February 1853; Resende, Rio de Janeiro, Empire of Brazil
- Died: 20 January 1919 (aged 65); São Paulo, Brazil
- Occupations: Educator, journalist
- Known for: Development of over 100 educational and welfare institutions in Brazil
- Spouse: Francisco Antônio Bastos (m. 1906)

Anália Franco (1 February 1853 — 20 January 1919) was a Brazilian educator, abolitionist, journalist, poet, writer, philanthropist and spiritist. A woman who was distinctly ahead of her time, she was responsible for founding more than 70 schools, 23 asylums for orphaned children, two hostels, a female musical band, an orchestra, a drama group, as well as several manufacturing workshops, in 24 cities in Brazil.

In São Paulo, she founded the Associação Feminina Beneficente e Instrutiva (Beneficent and Instructive Women's Association). She wrote O Novo Manual Educativo (The New Educational Manual); three novels; numerous plays; and several poems.

== Early life ==
Anália Emília Franco Bastos was born on 1 February 1853 in Resende, Rio de Janeiro in Rio de Janeiro state, the daughter of Antônio Mariano Franco Junior and Teresa Emília de Jesus. She had a brother and a sister. Until she was eight years old, she lived in Resende, being educated by her mother, who was a teacher. In 1861, the family moved to the state of São Paulo and would live in several different cities in that state. In 1868, at age 15, she began teaching, as an assistant to her mother.

== Social and educational activism ==
In 1872, Franco graduated as a teacher and had the opportunity to move to São Paulo, but chose to stay in the interior to help address the social consequences of the Freedom of Wombs Law, which had been approved on September 28, 1871. Under this, all children of slave women born from that year were considered free, but these would remain under the control of their mothers' masters until they were eight years old. This resulted in abuse and neglect by the slave owners, who had no interest in caring for children from whom they would receive no financial benefit. The children were often expelled from farms and left to become beggars. Franco established a Casa Maternal (Maternal House) in Jacareí to accommodate the children and wrote to women farmers asking them to support the children. Housing for the school was provided free of charge by a farmer but under the condition that black children should not be mixed with white. Franco did not accept the restriction and started to pay rent for the house, receiving children without segregation. This resulted in her school being evicted by the owner.

Faced with that situation, Franco decided to go to the city of São Paulo, where she rented an old house with her own money and announced the existence of the shelter in a local newspaper. She had insufficient money to feed the children and went personally to beg on the streets for resources. Considered to be a dangerous woman by many, she then began a campaign to develop more Maternal Houses throughout the state, with the support of some of the state's abolitionists and republicans. Following the abolition of slavery in 1888 and the proclamation of the First Brazilian Republic at the end of 1889, Franco was able to open two free schools for boys and girls. In the same year, she also created her own monthly magazine, Album das Meninas (Girls' Album), which stressed a concern for poor, black or marginalised women. She had already made contributions to women's magazines, such as A Família, A Mensageira and O Echo das Damas and would later begin the Revista da Associação Feminina (Women's Association Magazine).

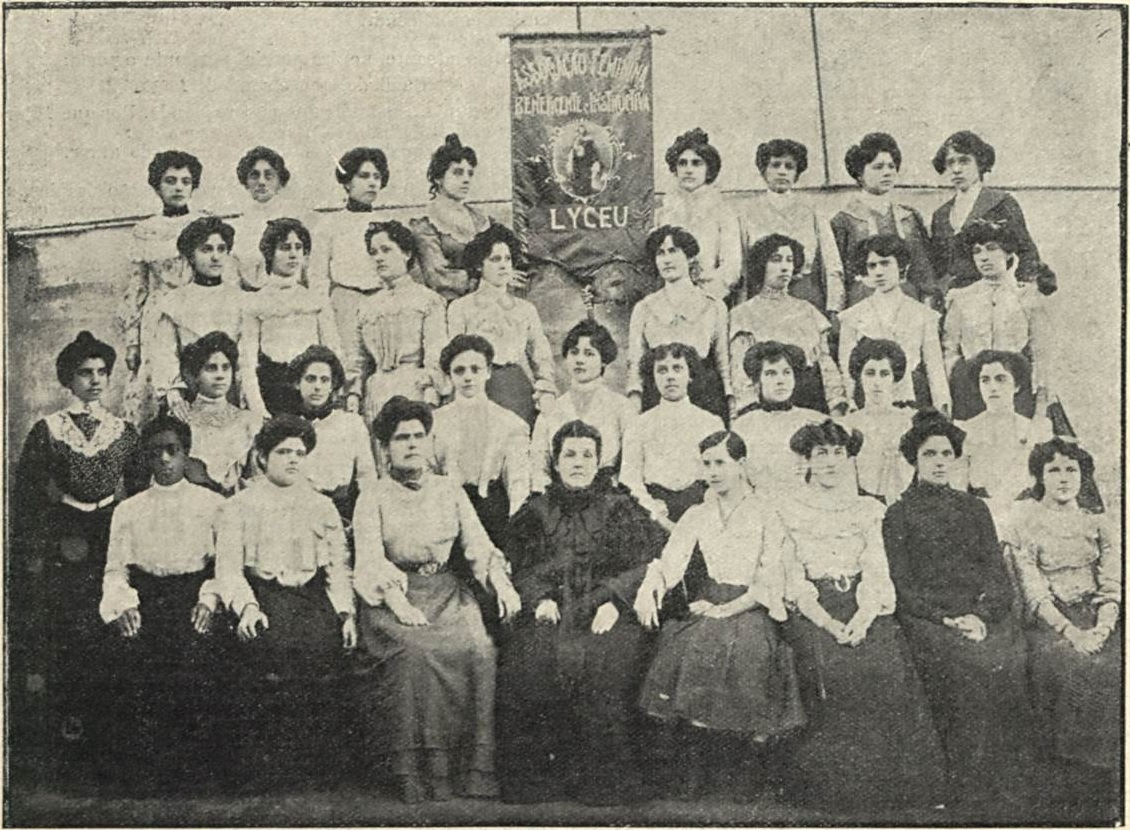
Anália Franco (centre of the first row) with students and faculty of the Women's School of the Associação Feminina Beneficente e Instrutiva, São Paulo 1907

Franco's previous support for the republican cause gave her the resources to continue with her work. Now living permanently in São Paulo, she founded the Associação Feminina Beneficente e Instrutiva in 1901, in support of women and children, which she carried on until the end of her life. As a result of this association, she built even more nursery and primary schools, as well as day-care centres, libraries, night schools, vocational workshops, nursing homes, shelters, health-care centres and workshops. In 1902, Franco inaugurated the Liceu Feminine, aimed at instructing and preparing female teachers for her schools, with a two-year course for nursery-school teachers and a three-year course for primary teachers. She wrote much of the course material herself, including O Novo Manual Educativo, which was divided into three sections, Childhood, Adolescence and Youth. By 1903 her work was becoming publicly acknowledged, when the São Paulo senator Paulo Egídio de Oliveira Carvalho spoke in the São Paulo senate in her support, repeating his observations in the following year. In 1903, Franco began publishing a monthly magazine, A Voz Maternal (The Maternal Voice).

Franco's work began to be acknowledged in the Brazilian press. However, some Catholic newspapers were critical because of her Spiritist ideas, which resulted in other papers jumping to her defence, including one that compared her to Joan of Arc. In 1911 she obtained land free of charge in Água Rasa, near São Paulo, where she founded the Colônia Regeneradora D. Romualdo (D. Romualdo Reform Colony), which aimed to reform prostitutes and women who had had children out of wedlock. The colony included places for boys, who were expected to farm the land.

== Death and legacy ==
On 20 January 1919, Franco fell victim to the 1918 Spanish flu pandemic, dying while preparing to travel to Rio de Janeiro to create yet another institution. This was later opened by her husband, Francisco Antônio Bastos, who she had married in 1906. Her name was subsequently given to a neighbourhood in São Paulo, Jardim Anália Franco (Anália Franco Garden), and Anália Franco is planned to also be the name of a metro station that will serve the neighbourhood from 2026.

== Bibliography ==
- Schumaher, Schuma; Brazil, Érico Vital (2000). Dicionário mulheres do Brasil: de 1500 até a atualidade com 270 ilustrações (2 ed.). Rio de Janeiro: J. Zahar. p. 567. ISBN 978-85-7110-573-7.
- Wantuil, Zêus (1969). Grandes espíritas do Brasil: 53 biografias (in Brazilian Portuguese). Federação Espírita Brasileira.
- Bittencourt, Adalzira (1969). Dicionário bio-bibliográfico de mulheres ilustres, notáveis e intelectuais do Brasil (ilustrado) (in Brazilian Portuguese). Pongetti.
