= COVID-19 pandemic in São Paulo (state) =

Ongoing COVID-19 viral pandemic in Brazil

- Disease: COVID-19
- Pathogen: SARS-CoV-2
- Location: Brazil
- First outbreak: Wuhan, Hubei, China
- Index case: São Paulo
- Arrival date: 26 February 2020 (6 years, 2 months, 3 weeks and 1 day)
- Confirmed cases: 310,517 (3 July 2020)
- Deaths: 15,694

Government website
- www.seade.gov.br/coronavirus/

The city of São Paulo in São Paulo state registered the first case of the pandemic in Brazil, a 61-year-old man who had returned from Italy and tested positive for the coronavirus of severe acute respiratory syndrome 2 (SARS-CoV-2).

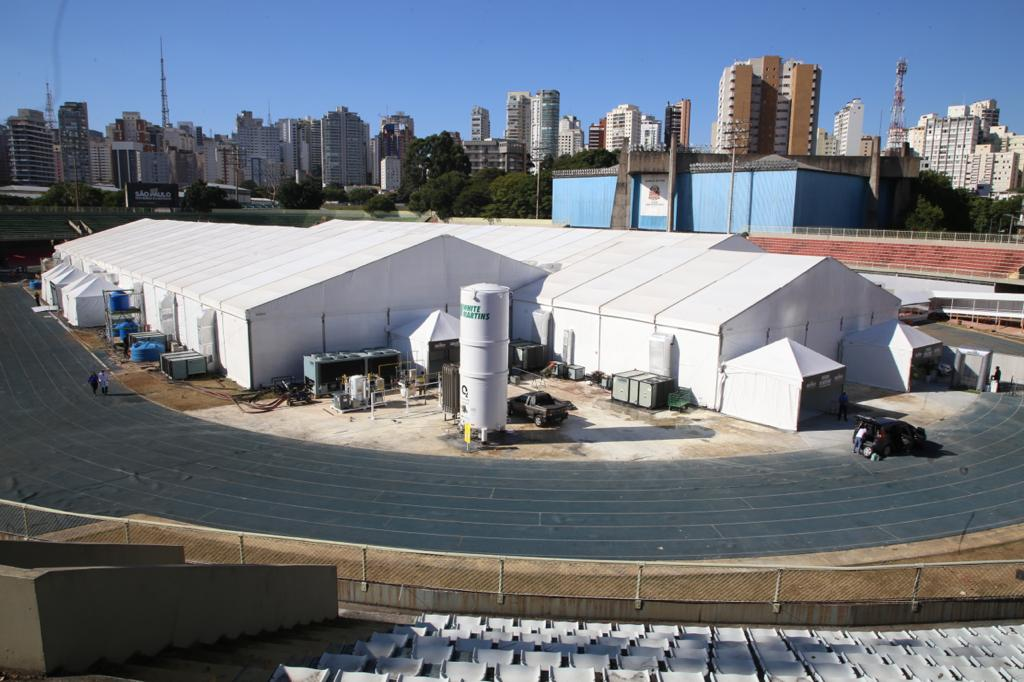
Field hospital from Ibirapuera, in the capital city of São Paulo.

In the city of São Paulo, field hospitals for the exclusive care of people with COVID-19 were built by the municipal and state governments. Hospitals were established at Pacaembu Stadium, at the Ibirapuera Gymnasium athletics track and the Anhembi Convention Center.

== Evolution of the number of cases and deaths ==
The graphs below show the growth of cases and deaths in the state. On new case and death charts, the bars represent the actual number of notifications per day, while the line is a seven-day moving average to help smooth out anomalies between days and reveal the overall trend. The data are from the Ministry of Health (MH).

COVID-19 in (São Paulo (state)) São Paulo
New cases, each day.

New deaths, each day.

Cumulative cases.

Cumulative deaths.

=== By municipality ===
This is the list of municipalities with the most confirmed cases, out of a total of 584 municipalities with at least one case, by June 17, 2020:

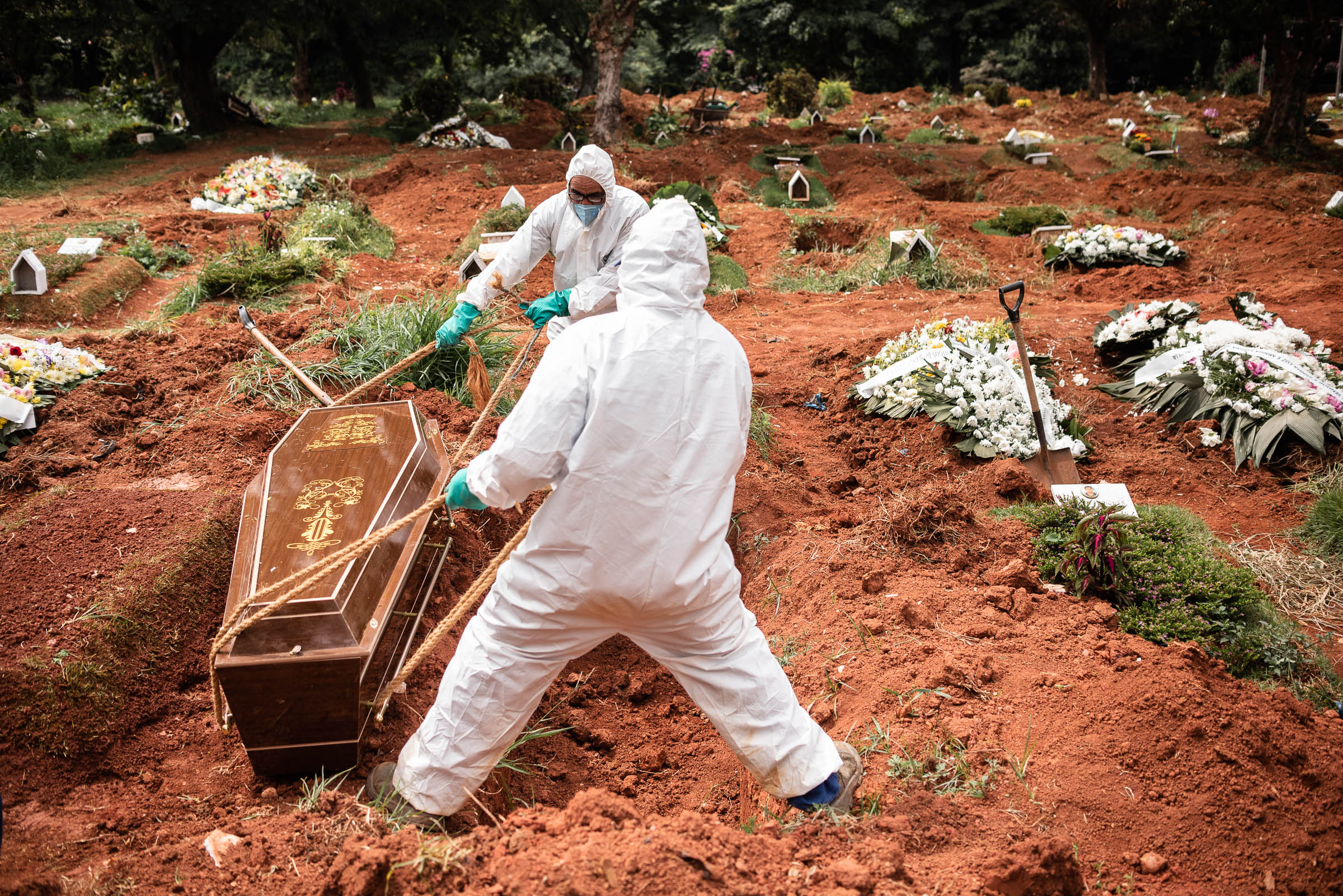
Gravediggers wearing protection against contamination bury the body of a man suspected of having died of COVID-19 in the cemetery of Vila Alpina, east side of São Paulo, in April 2020.

Position	Municipality	N.° cases	N.° deaths
1	São Paulo	98132	5959
2	Santos	6553	243
3	São Bernardo do Campo	4902	309
4	Guarulhos	4464	500
5	Campinas	4302	185
6	Osasco	4286	418
7	Santo André	4131	207
8	Guarujá	2444	93
9	Jundiaí	2221	127
10	Diadema	2135	137
11	Ribeirão Preto	2058	82
12	Praia Grande	1952	71
13	São Vicente	1785	110
14	Mauá	1720	120
15	Carapicuíba	1720	118
16	Sorocaba	1700	84
17	São José dos Campos	1700	64
18	Barueri	1694	179
19	Mogi das Cruzes	1497	128
20	Taboão da Serra	1461	108
21	São José do Rio Preto	1352	46
22	Piracicaba	1213	55
23	Cubatão	1188	63
24	São Caetano do Sul	1150	60
25	Suzano	1100	90
26	Itaquaquecetuba	945	110
27	Embu das Artes	910	73
28	Cotia	904	67
29	Itapevi	826	107
30	Santana de Parnaíba	783	26
31	Itapecerica da Serra	755	58
32	Francisco Morato	727	36
33	Ferraz de Vasconcelos	631	58
34	Franco da Rocha	609	55
35	Araraquara	575	7

== See also ==
- COVID-19 pandemic
- COVID-19 pandemic in South America
- COVID-19 pandemic in Brazil
