= Santa Clara (São Paulo Metro) =

Future railway station in São Paulo, Brazil

Coordinates: 23°34′25″S 46°34′0″W

General information
- Location: Av. Sapopemba, 2271, Água Rasa; São Paulo; Brazil
- Owner: Government of the State of São Paulo
- Operator: Companhia do Metropolitano de São Paulo
- Platforms: Side platforms
- Connections: Santa Clara Bus Terminal (future)

Construction
- Structure type: Underground
- Accessible: y

History
- Opening: 2026; 0 years ago (estimated)
- Former names: Água Rasa

Services
Preceding station	São Paulo Metro	Following station
Orfanato towards Vila Madalena	Line 2	Anália Franco towards Penha
Track layout
Location

Santa Clara is a metro station under construction in São Paulo Metro Line 2-Green. It is part of the expansion project of Line 2 between Vila Prudente and Dutra (Guarulhos), estimated to be opened in mid-2026.

== History ==
The first project for a station in Rua do Orfanato was made in mid-2000s as part of the São Paulo Metropolitan Company project "Rede Distributiva". The proposed station would be located in the surroundings of Anália Franco Shopping Mall and would be part of the line Tatuapé-Berrini. The project "Rede Distributiva" was abandoned in 2006 for the creation of a new one called "Rede Essencial", which kept the proposed station in the same location, but in the project of an expansion of Line 2-Green between Vila Prudente and Tatuapé.

In the end of the 2000s, the expansion of Line 2 had its track altered, with the interchange station moved from Tatuapé to Penha. With that, the original Água Rasa station was renamed to Anália Franco, while Água Rasa became a new proposed station.

The Metropolitan Company hired the Environmental Impact Studies and the Environment Impact Report, presenting its results in 2012, with the details of the station location. Later, a decree was signed, expropriating an area of 16,637.34 m^{2} (179,082.8 sq ft). The works of the station were divided in 8 lots and bidded and hired by the company Mendes Junior in September 2014, with Água Rasa included in Lot 3 (next to Orfanato station and its respective ventilation pits).

The decree of service order was suspended due to the 2014 economic crisis, which obligated the state government to begin an expenditure containment regime. Only the demolition works of expropriated areas and cleaning of the construction sites were authorized. Between 2017 and 2018, almost all of the properties were demolished. At the same time, Mendes Junior hired the company Infra7 Engenharia to elaborate a project of the future station and its annexed bus terminal.

After almost 6 years suspended, the service order was given on 17 January 2020.

== Toponymy ==
Água Rasa is the popular name of Tatuapé Brook, which spring is located next to the future station. Because it is not so deep, the population renamed the brook in the 19th century. At the east margin of the brook, the allotment, which created the district, had been founded during the 1930s. Therefore, due to the proximity of the station to the brook spring, the location inside the district of Água Rasa, the projected station was named Água Rasa.

Besides that, some residents of the region requested in 2014, through a petition signed with 20 names, the renaming of the station to Santa Clara, name of a borough next to the future station. The proposed became a project made by State Deputy Orlando Morando (PSDB). However, it was rejected for lack of arguments for the renaming.

The city of São Paulo only has Sub-Prefectures and district as official administrative divisions, with its divisions regulated by the force of the law. Therefore, the boroughs are non-official denominations without defined borders, created by real state companies for advertising purposes and used by Correios (Post Office Company) for postal addresses purposes. According to Correios' register, the station will be located between the boroughs of Vila Diva and Vila Celes, rather than Vila Santa Clara, as the 20 residents and the State Deputy purposed.

In October 2020, the station was renamed to Santa Clara.
