= Teatro Colombo =

Theatre and cinema in São Paulo, Brazil

Colombo Theater
- Teatro Colombo
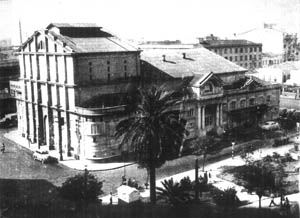
- Teatro Colombo (pre-1937)

General information
- Architectural style: Eclectic
- Location: São Paulo, São Paulo, Brazil
- Construction started: 1902
- Inaugurated: February 20th, 1908
- Destroyed: July 19, 1966

Height
- Height: 45m

Other information
- Seating capacity: 1968

The Colombo Theater (Portuguese: Teatro Colombo) was a Brazilian playhouse located in Largo da Concórdia, in the Brás district of São Paulo. It was the best acoustic theater in the city and had a capacity of 1968 seats. Italian composer Pietro Mascagni conducted his opera Amica at the venue.

== History ==
The theater was inaugurated on February 20, 1908 with the support of Colonel França Pinto after the renovation of the old Brás Market building in Largo da Concórdia. At the inauguration, the play Marie Antoinette, Queen of France, by Giacometti, was presented by the Italian Dramatic Company and directed by actor Antonio Bolognesi. It had a capacity of 1968 seats, including 39 boxes and 24 balconies. It also included audience seats and three grandstands with 260 standing places. The venue had the best acoustics in the city.

The Colombo, established when São Paulo's theaters were becoming more exclusive and the prices charged were exorbitant, became known as a meeting place for families from the industrial and populous neighborhoods because the prices were affordable for the working classes. On August 3, 1911, composer Pietro Mascagni conducted his opera Amica at the venue, which led to the building receiving a commemorative plaque in its lobby. The performance featured a production of 183 people from Italy, including the musicians of the orchestra.

The Colombo hosted Brazilian artists such as Itália Fausta, Leopoldo Fróes, Procópio Ferreira and Nino Nello. It also received international performers and numerous foreign companies, especially Italian ones, for operas, ballets, concerts and plays. Over time, it began showing movies and hosting carnival balls that became famous in the city. The venue also held large demonstrations by workers and anarchist groups.

In 1911, after being leased by the Companhia Cinematográfica Brasileira owned by Francisco Serrador, the venue became a movie theater and decayed in the following years. The City Hall recovered it and reopened it in 1952, but it was unable to retake the previous success. In July 1957, the building was closed due to problems in the roof. Later, plans began to demolish it to construct the Radial Leste.

On July 19, 1966, the building collapsed in flames and was completely destroyed; the causes of the fire are unknown. The newspaper O Estado de S. Paulo reported that the theater had been threatened with destruction by anonymous phone calls. The first fire started in a mattress placed in the empty theater on July 17. On that occasion, the fire was controlled, but two days later, it started again and destroyed the venue in thirty minutes. The building was located next to the former North Station of the Central Railway of Brazil, later called Roosevelt Station. Today it is called Brás Station and belongs to the Companhia Paulista de Trens Metropolitanos (CPTM), which is integrated with the São Paulo Metro.

== See also ==
- Tourism in the city of São Paulo
- São José Theater
- Municipal Theatre of São Paulo
