= Pyongyang Theological Seminary =

Protestant seminary in North Korea

- Former name: Pyongyang Chosun Jesus Presbyterian Seminary
- Type: Seminary
- Established: 1901
- Affiliation: Korean Christian Federation (KCF)
- Location: Pyongyang, North Korea

The Pyongyang Theological Seminary (also known as the Pyongyang Theological Academy, but commonly known simply as the Pyongyang Seminary) is a Protestant theological seminary in Pyongyang, the capital of North Korea. It is run by the government-controlled Korean Christian Federation (KCF) and trains pastors and evangelists.

Founded in 1901 as the Pyongyang Chosun Jesus Presbyterian Seminary, the seminary has historically been associated with Presbyterianism. It became the center of Korean Christianity of the early 20th century. By 1916 its founder Samuel Austin Moffett was in disagreement over practical matters with another teacher, James Scarth Gale. The row developed into a schism on doctrinal matters and in 1959 the seminary split into the conservative Chongshin University and the liberal Presbyterian College and Theological Seminary.

In 1938, during the Japanese occupation of Korea, the seminary was temporarily closed down after students defied orders to bow to Shinto shrines. After the division of Korea, the seminary was relocated to Seoul in South Korea and renamed the Presbyterian Theological Seminary.

The Pyongyang-based seminary resumed operations in 1972 after having been assumed by the KCF. When its funds ran out in 1995, the Korean Methodist Church (KMC) of South Korea assumed a share of its financial responsibilities.

== History ==
=== Presbyterian roots ===
Originally called the Pyongyang Chosun Jesus Presbyterian Seminary, it was founded in 1901 by Samuel Austin Moffett, the father of Samuel H. Moffett. Samuel Austin was motivated to found the seminary in Pyongyang because the city had been badly damaged in the First Sino-Japanese War. Initially, the seminary would consist of two years of preparatory courses and the actual seminary lasting three years. In the beginning, Samuel Austin taught his students at home. He was its first president until 1918 and a faculty member until 1935. The Seminary was the center of Korean Christianity of the early 20th century.

In 1905 the seminary became affiliated with the Presbyterian Church in the United States. The first class graduated in 1907. A building was constructed in 1909 and renewed in 1922. By 1916 Moffett was in disagreement with a teacher at the school, James Scarth Gale. Their differences concerning the quality of teaching, materials, and admission would develop into a schism between conservatives and liberals. Initially, the seminary remained conservative and mission-oriented.

The seminary was temporarily closed in 1938 following the Japanese occupation of Korea. The Japanese occupiers demanded that students of the seminary would bow to Shinto shrines, something that they could not agree to. Until 1940, the seminary had been the only seminary in Korea maintained by the Presbyterian Church. After the division of Korea, the seminary was relocated to Seoul in South Korea in 1948 and renamed the Presbyterian Theological Seminary.

In 1959 the seminary finally split due to the doctrinal differences into the conservative Chongshin University and the more moderate Presbyterian College and Theological Seminary.

=== Under government control ===
In 1972, the seminary was reopened and assumed by the government-controlled Protestant body Korean Christian Federation (KCF). The seminary operated under KCF until 1995 when it ran out of funds. In April 1999, the Korean Methodist Church (KMC) of South Korea offered to fund the seminary to secure the continuation of its operation. KMC provided funding of $600,000 for three years. It reopened in 2000, and a new building was completed in 2003.

== Operation ==
The seminary is run by the KCF, which chooses its students and devises its curriculum. KMC, however, is consulted each semester. The seminary is located in Pyongyang, the capital of North Korea.

The seminary trains pastors and evangelists for the KCF. Before 1995, the seminary had produced some 60 graduates.

=== Attendees ===
- Yi Seung-hoon
- Hahn Sang-dong (1933-1936)
- Bang Ji-il
- Yoo Jae-kee (1932)
- Kil Sun-joo
- Chu Ki-chol
- Kang Ryang-uk, president of KCF
- Kang Yong-sop, president of KCF
- Park Yun-sun (1934)
- Song Yang-wong (1938)

=== Professors ===
- Samuel Austin Moffett
- William Davis Reynolds
- Horace Grant Underwood
- Hyuk Namkung, first Korean Doctor of Divinity and first Korean professor at the seminary.
- Park Hyng-nong, became the second Korean professor at the seminary (systematic theology) in 1931

== See also ==
- Christianity in Korea
- Presbyterian Church in Korea (HapDong)
- Presbyterian Church of Korea (TongHap)
- Religion in North Korea
