= Samuel Moffett =

Samuel Moffett may refer to:

- Samuel Austin Moffett (1864–1939), American Presbyterian missionary to Korea
- Samuel H. Moffett (1916–2015), his son, professor, missionary and scholar on Christianity in the Far East

== See also ==
- Samuel M. Ralston (Samuel Moffett Ralston, 1857–1925), American politician in the state of Indiana
