= Catholic Church in North Korea =

- Korean: 조선의 가톨릭 교회
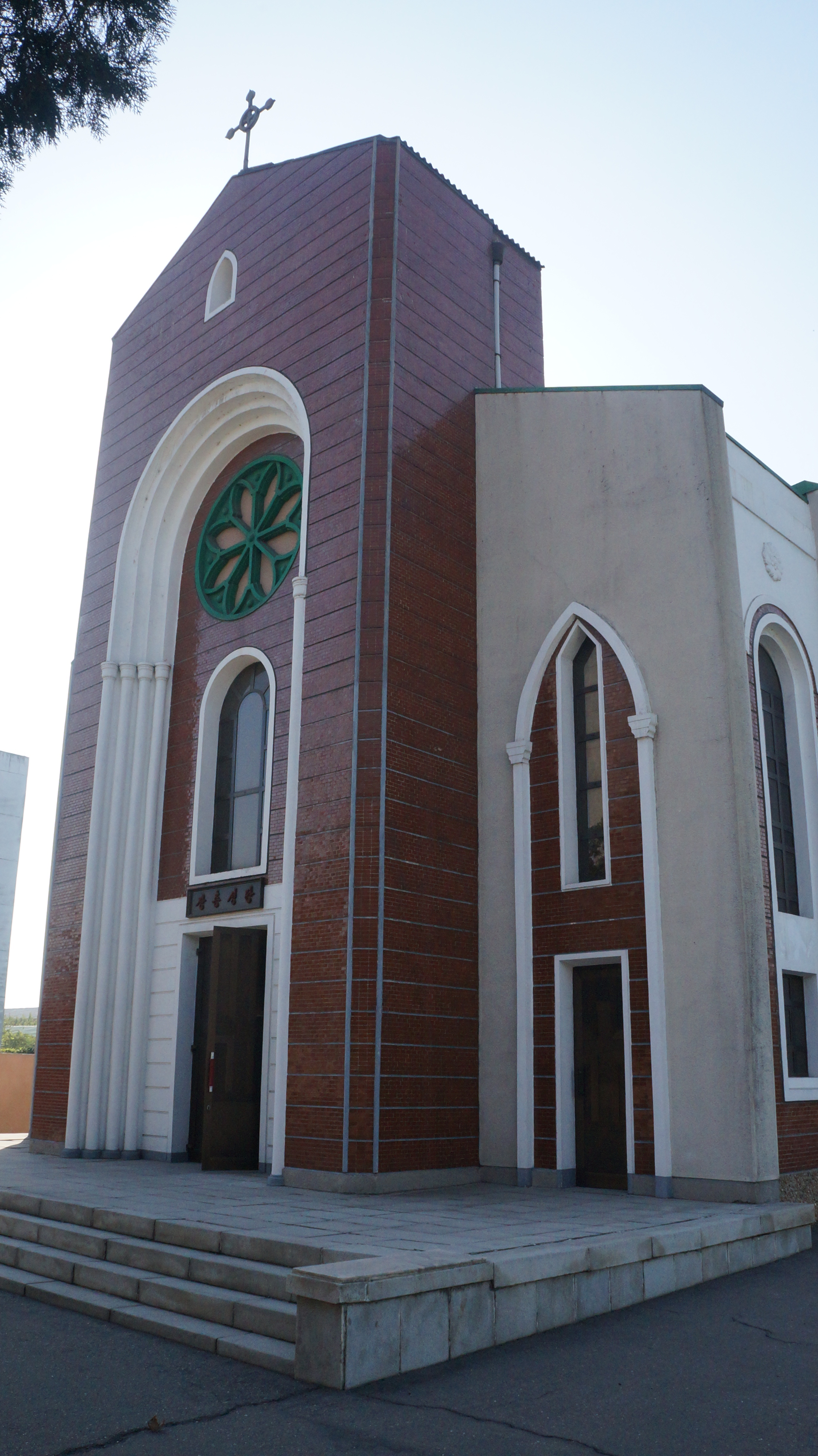
- Changchung Cathedral
- Type: National polity
- Classification: Catholic
- Orientation: Asian Christianity, Latin
- Scripture: Catholic Bible
- Theology: Catholic theology
- Governance: Korean Catholic Association (de facto); Catholic Bishops' Conference of Korea (de jure)
- Pope: Leo XIV
- President: Samuel Chang Jae-on (de facto); Matthias Ri Iong-hoon (de jure)
- Apostolic Nuncio: Giovanni Gaspari
- Region: North Korea
- Language: Ecclesiastical Latin, Korean
- Headquarters: Pyongyang
- Origin: 27 December 1593
- Other name: 천주교/天主敎 ("Religion of the Lord of Heaven")
- Official website: english.cbck.or.kr

Dioceses of Korea

The Catholic Church in North Korea retains a community of several hundred adherents who practice under the supervision of the state-established Korean Catholic Association (KCA) rather than the Catholic hierarchy. The dioceses of the Church have remained vacant since Christian persecutions in the late 1940s. The most prominent congregation is that of Pyongyang, which meets at Changchung Cathedral. According to a KCA official, two other congregations exist. The state ideology of Juche has largely displaced Catholic faith, and full services are provided only to people with a Catholic family background.

== History ==
The first Catholic missionaries arrived in Korea in 1794, a decade after the return of Yi Sung-hun, a diplomat who was the first Korean to be baptized into the Catholic faith (which occurred in Beijing). He established a grassroots lay Catholic movement in the peninsula. However, the writings of the Jesuit missionary Matteo Ricci, who was resident at the imperial court in Beijing, had been already brought to Korea from China in the seventeenth century. Scholars of the Silhak ("Practical Learning") were attracted to Catholic doctrines, and this was a key factor for the spread of the Catholic faith in the 1790s. The penetration of Western ideas and Christianity in Korea became known as Seohak ("Western Learning"). A study of 1801 found that more than half of the families that had converted to Catholicism were linked to the Silhak school. Largely because converts refused to perform Confucian ancestral rituals, the Joseon government prohibited the proselytization of Christianity. Some Catholics were executed during the early nineteenth century, but the restrictive law was not well enforced.

A large number of Christians lived in the northern half of the peninsula where Confucian influence was not as strong as in the south. Before 1948, Pyongyang was an important Christian center: one-sixth of its population of about 300,000 people were Christian converts. The population of the Pyongyang diocese as of 1943 was 3,650,623, all ethnic Koreans.

After the division of Korea, however, the Communist government under Kim Il Sung persecuted Christians as imperialist collaborators and spies. Much of the Catholic community was either killed or imprisoned, and many more fled south. The martyrdom of the Benedictine monks of Tokwon Abbey was documented as the process of beatification was initiated for them.

The Korean Catholic Association (the state-run church) was set up on 30 June 1988. Samuel Chang Jae-on has been its president since its establishment. The association published a catechism and a prayer book in 1991.

The Changchung Cathedral was built in Pyongyang by the North Korean government in 1988 and is operated by the Korean Catholic Association. It has no priests and no bishop, but Mass is celebrated there on major feasts by South Korean priests, following a 2015 agreement between the Korean Catholic Association and the Catholic Bishops' Conference of Korea.

Kim Jong Il invited Pope John Paul II to Pyongyang after the 2000 inter-Korean summit, but the visit failed to materialize. A similar invitation to Pope Francis was made by Kim Jong Un following a series of inter-Korean summits in 2018. In 2022, Pope Francis expressed interest in visiting North Korea, if invited by the North Korean government.

Caritas Internationalis has operated in North Korea, running hospitals and other humanitarian projects. "Proselytism" is strictly forbidden, with customs seizing religious texts upon entry.

An invitation for the KCA to attend a Papal Mass in Seoul on 18 August 2014, during a 4-day visit to South Korea by Pope Francis, was declined by the association.

In 2016, the KCA released a fiery communique concerning then-South Korean President Park Geun-Hye, denouncing her and her "satanic hordes" of supporters, saying Catholics were united with their fellow DPRK citizens in opposing her leadership.

== Dioceses and archdioceses ==
- Archdiocese of Seoul 서울 (Seat in South Korea)
- Diocese of Chunchon 춘천 (Seat in South Korea)
- Diocese of Hamhung 함흥
- Diocese of Pyong-yang 평양
- Territorial Abbacy of Tŏkwon 덕원

== Cathedrals in North Korea ==
- Changchung Cathedral in Pyongyang, North Korea (Diocese of Pyong-yang 평양)
- Tokwon Abbey of St. Benedict in Tokwon 덕원, North Korea (Territorial Abbacy of Tŏkwon 덕원)

== See also ==
- Persecution of Christians in North Korea
- Religion in Korea
- Religion in North Korea
- Christianity in Korea
- Catholic Church in South Korea
- List of Catholic dioceses in Korea
- List of saints from Asia
- Korean Catholic Association
