= Freedom of religion in North Korea =

Freedom of religion in North Korea is officially a right. However, in 2022, the UN secretary-general reported that North Korea's "right to freedom of thought, conscience, and religion ... continues to be denied ..."; NGOs and North Korean defectors reported that any religious activities unauthorized by the state (e.g., praying, reading the Bible and any contact with a missionary) could lead to punishment, including detention in a prison camp.

Due to the country's inaccessibility and the inability to gain timely information, this activity remains difficult to verify.

== Religion in North Korea ==
Traditionally, religion in North Korea primarily consisted of Buddhism and Confucianism and to a lesser extent Shamanism. Since the arrival of Northern and Eastern Europeans in the 18th century, there is also a Christian minority. Syncretic Chondogyo emerged more recently.

== Status of religious freedom ==
Article 256 of North Korea's criminal law stipulates that anyone who engages in superstitious practices shall be sentenced to a labor discipline camp. Articles 23 and 29 of the Reactionary Ideology and Culture Rejection Act explicitly prohibit the dissemination of superstition.

A report released in 2018 confirmed the existence of several state-sanctioned religious groups, including the KCF, Korea Buddhist Union, Korean Catholic Council, Korea Cheondoist Church Central Committee, Korea Orthodox Church Committee, and Korean Council of Religionists. Unauthorised religion is illegal and is often practiced in secret.

In 2019, North Korea was ranked as the worst country in the world in terms of Christian persecution by international Catholic aid organization Aid to the Church in Need. In 2023 and 2025, the country was ranked as the worst place in the world to be a Christian by Open Doors. In 2023, the country was scored zero out of 4 for religious freedom. This continued in 2025.

As of 2012, an estimated 150,000 to 200,000 people were believed to be held in political prison camps (Kwalliso) which are located in remote areas of North Korea, many for religious and political reasons. The number of Christians in prison camps in 2022 is estimated to be 200,000. Family members of believers are considered guilty by association and sent to labor camps or prisons.

In March 2006, the Government reportedly sentenced Son Jong-nam to death for espionage. However, some NGOs claimed that the sentence against Son was based on his contacts with Christian groups in China, his proselytizing activities, and his alleged sharing of information with his brother in South Korea. Son's brother reported that information indicated that Son was alive as of spring 2007. Because the country effectively bars outside observers from investigating such reports, it was not possible to verify the Government's claims about Son Jong-nam's activities or determine whether he had been executed. A fellow inmate of the Pyongyang prison where Son was held states that he died there in December 2008. In 2013, the South Korean newspaper JoongAng Ilbo reported that North Koreans in Wonsan discovered in possession of a Bible were among a group of 80 North Koreans killed in a wave of mass executions in the country. Others in the group were executed for other "relatively light transgressions such as watching South Korean movies or distributing pornography." However, others have testified in interviews that North Korean citizens have full rights to own and use religious texts and worship at church, although there may not be many young believers.

According to Alejandro Cao de Benós, Special Delegate of North Korea's Committee for Cultural Relations with Foreign Countries, the government allows only religions that are considered "traditional" in Korea, such as Christianity, Buddhism or Cheondoism.

== Religion in politics ==
Historically, there have been only two openly religious parties at the Supreme People's Assembly, the former Korea Buddhist Federation and the current Chondoist Chongu Party, which has been in the Assembly since 1948. There are other religious organizations such as the Korean Christian Federation, founded by Christians that joined the communist administration during the division of Korea, or the North Korean Council of Religionists.

== See also ==
- Religion in North Korea
- Human rights in North Korea
- Jaegaseung
