= Chu Ki-chol =

Korean independence activist (1897–1944)

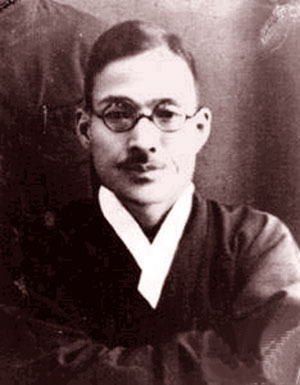
- Born: 25 November 1897; Changwon, South Gyeongsang Province, Korean Empire
- Died: 21 April 1944 (aged 46); Korea, Empire of Japan
- Cause of death: Torture
- Education: Osan School, Yonhi College, Pyongyang Theological Seminary
- Occupation: Presbyterian minister
- Religion: Christianity
- Church: Cho Rang Church, Moon Chang Church, Sanjunghyun Church
- Ordained: 10 January 1926
- Writings: My Five Fold Prayer

Korean name
- Hangul: 주기철
- Hanja: 朱基徹
- RR: Ju Gicheol
- MR: Chu Kich'ŏl

Chu Ki-chol (Korean: 주기철, born Chu Ki-bok, 25 November 1897 – 21 April 1944) was a Korean Presbyterian minister and martyr. After having dropped out of Yonhi College due to poor health and being briefly associated with the March 1st Movement for the independence of Korea, Chu attended a faith meeting of Kim Ik-du. Thereafter, he sought a career in ministry, enrolling first at the Pyongyang Theological Seminary becoming a deacon. Chu was ordained a minister in 1926 and served as one in Pusan, Masan, and Pyongyang.

Chu opposed Shinto practices forced on Korean Christians by the Japanese occupiers. He was first arrested in February 1938 and tortured in prison. Still defiant, the Pyongyang Presbytery relieved him from ministry and the authorities arrested him three more times. His last arrest was in July 1940. He died of torture in prison on 21 April 1944.

After his death, the South Korean government has given recognition for him, including conferring upon him Order of Merit for National Foundation, Third Class. He was declared Independence Fighter of the Month in November 2007. Despite him being revered as a Korean nationalist, in his sermons he explained that his actions emanated from his Christian faith.

== Early life ==
Chu was born to Chu Hyun-sung and Cho Jae-sung on 25 November 1897 in Book-boo-ri, Woong-chung-myun, Changwon, South Gyeongsang Province, Korea. He was the fourth of seven children of a Christian family. His birth name was Ki-bok, but he changed it to Ki-chol (기철; 基徹, meaning "devotee") to reflect his faith. Chu went to a private elementary school at age eight in Woong-chun-eup in 1904. In 1912 he moved on to Osan School, a hotbed of both Korean nationalism and Christianity that were agitated there by Lee Seung-hoon and Cho Man-sik. After graduating in 1916, he went to Yonhi College in Seoul in 1917, majoring in commerce on the advice of his father. In his second year in Yonhi, his sight began to deteriorate and he was diagnosed with cataracts. He was forced to drop out and return to his hometown. In 1919, Chu participated in the March 1st Movement for the independence of Korea. He was elected chairman of the Joseon Youth Corps, representing the Woongjin Youth Activist Group. But after having attended a faith meeting hosted by Kim Ik-du, and allegedly regaining his sight there, he chose to pursue a different path. He enroll at the Pyongyang Theological Seminary, becoming a deacon. Chu was ordained a minister on 10 January 1926. He served as one at the Cho Rang Church in Pusan, South Gyeongsang Province. During the time of Chu's ministry, Korea was under Japanese occupation and the occupiers demanded Korean Christians to pay homage to Shinto shrines. Chu refused, calling the practice out as idolatry. In 1931 Chu organized local protests against the practice in South Gyeongsang Province. From 22 September 1931, Chu was minister at the Moon Chang Church in Masan. From the summer of 1936, he became minister of Sanjunghyun Church in Pyongyang. There he broadened the scope of his campaign against forced shrine visits making it a nationwide movement whose center was Sanjunghyun Church.

He opposed the order to house kamidana (miniature Shinto altars) in churches. Chu had a habit of retreating to the mountains to pray. In the summer of 1938 he went to fast on Myohyangsan with two friends. He would also pray on the Moranbong overnight. Chu began to be considered the successor of Gil Seon-ju as the leader of the Presbyterian movement in Korea.

== Imprisonment and death ==
For his defiance, Chu was arrested in February 1938 and taken into prison, where he was tortured until he was released months later. After his release, Chu defended his views in a sermon called "Determination for Death" in September 1938. In it, he explained that his conviction was based on faith, not nationalism. His opposition was based in his conservative theology and its implications on his thinking about idolatry. That same month Chu was arrested again, briefly, to keep him out of the general assembly of the Korean Presbyterian Church that the Japanese authorities forced to accept Shinto practice. He continued his protest and was subsequently jailed two more times. His time in prison totaled five years. In February 1939, Chu was allowed to pay a visit to his home and his church for three days. During this time, he gave a sermon entitled "My Five Fold Prayer". Although thoroughly conservative in theology, this sermon has been interpreted as a radical nationalist outburst in South Korea.

In August 1940, a Japanese pastor dispatched by the government gave a speech in Chu's Sanjunghyun Church. He claimed that Christians worshiping at Shinto shrines was not a sin. Chu confronted the pastor, embarrassing him greatly. The Japanese retaliated, ordering the Pyongyang Presbytery to relieve him of his pastoral duties and expel his family from church property. Chu was imprisoned for the last time; the charges were treason and breaching the Maintenance of the Public Order Act. After his death the Sanchonghyon Church was closed down by the Japanese authorities. He was tortured again. Torture left him weakened and he died in Pyongyang Prison's medical ward on 21 April 1944. His last words were "God of my soul, hold me firm." Chu was buried in a public cemetery in Pyongyang.

== Legacy ==
On 10 July 1968, the South Korean government declared Chu an Honored Patriot. In 1990, Chu was posthumously awarded the South Korean Independence Medal (Order of Merit for National Foundation, Third Class). In 2007, the Ministry of Patriots and Veterans Affairs chose him as Independence Fighter of the Month for November, marking the 110th anniversary of his birth. There is a memorial to Chu at the National Military Cemetery in Seoul, as well as in his native Changwon.

== Works ==
- Chu Ki-chol (1989). "My Five Fold Prayer: The Last Testament of the Rev. Chu Ki Chol, Martyr During the Japanese Occupation of Korea". In Sand Chang; Yong-bok Kim; Keun Won Park; David K S Suh (eds.). Testimonies of Faith in Korea. Geneva: World Alliance of Reformed Churches. pp. 94–98. OCLC 33474644.

== See also ==
- Choe Sang-rim
- Christianity in Korea
- Korean independence movement
- Minjung theology
- Presbyterianism in South Korea

Honorary titles
| Preceded by Gwon Deug-su | Independence Fighter of the Month; November 2007 | Succeeded by Yun Dong-ju |
