= Bongsu Church =

Coordinates: 39.045285°N 125.706361°E

- 봉수교회
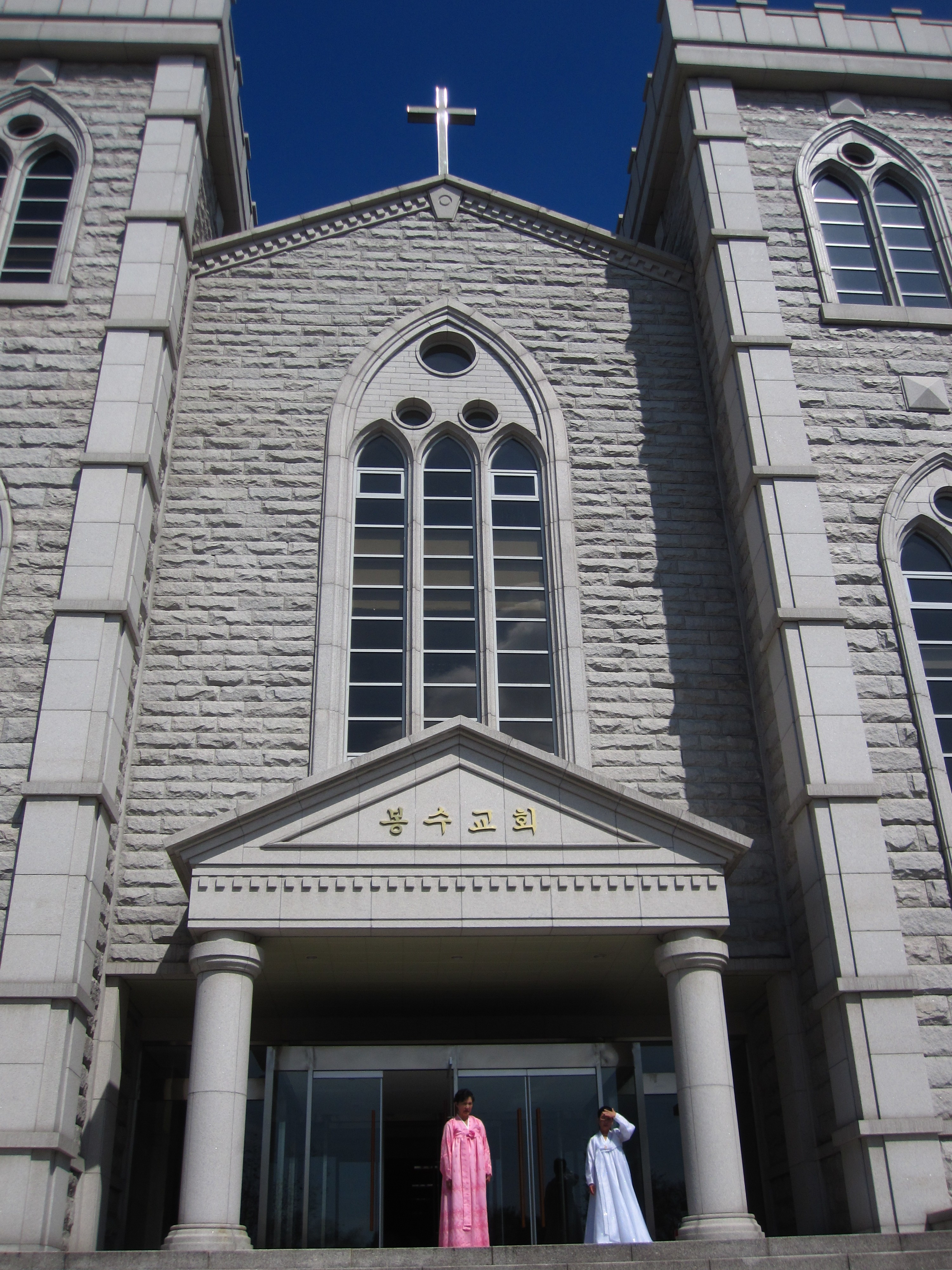
- Exterior of the church

- Location within Pyongyang
- Location: Konguk-dong, Mangyongdae, Pyongyang
- Country: North Korea
- Denomination: Protestant

History
- Founded: September 1988

Architecture
- Years built: rebuilt in 2008
- Construction cost: $4.3 million

Specifications
- Capacity: 1,200

Administration
- Division: Korean Christian Federation

Bongsu Church (Korean: 봉수교회) is a Protestant church in the Konguk-dong of the Mangyongdae District of Pyongyang in North Korea.

It is one of just a handful of churches in the country and one of only two Protestant churches, the other one being Chilgol Church. Bongsu Church was originally constructed in 1988 and was the first church built in the country during communist rule. The church was relocated to a larger building around 2008 and now seats up to 1,200 people.

== History ==
The original Bongsu Church was built in September 1988. At the time, it was the first church built in North Korea after the Korean War, during which all churches in the North were destroyed, and the first one built during communist rule as well. It was opened just ahead of the 1989 World Festival of Youth and Students that was held in Pyongyang. The church was built to showcase freedom of religion in North Korea, amid international pressure concerning the issue. The construction cost half a million won (250,000 dollars) and was funded by Christians from overseas. Until the 1990s, there was no Christian cross on top of the church. One was added when visiting foreign Christians pointed out the omission.

The church has since been rebuilt and relocated in 2008, for a price of four billion won (4.3 million dollars), paid entirely by the South Korean Presbyterian Church Association.

In 1992, when Kang Yong-sop, who acted as the chairman of the Korean Christian Federation, oversaw the church, Billy Graham paid a visit there to preach. Graham preached at the church again in 1994. Billy's son, Franklin preached in 2000 and 2008. Billy Graham's wife Ruth has also made a public speech at the church. Other visiting preachers include South Korean Han Sang-ryeol, who visited in 2010 without the authorization of the South Korean government.

== Operation ==
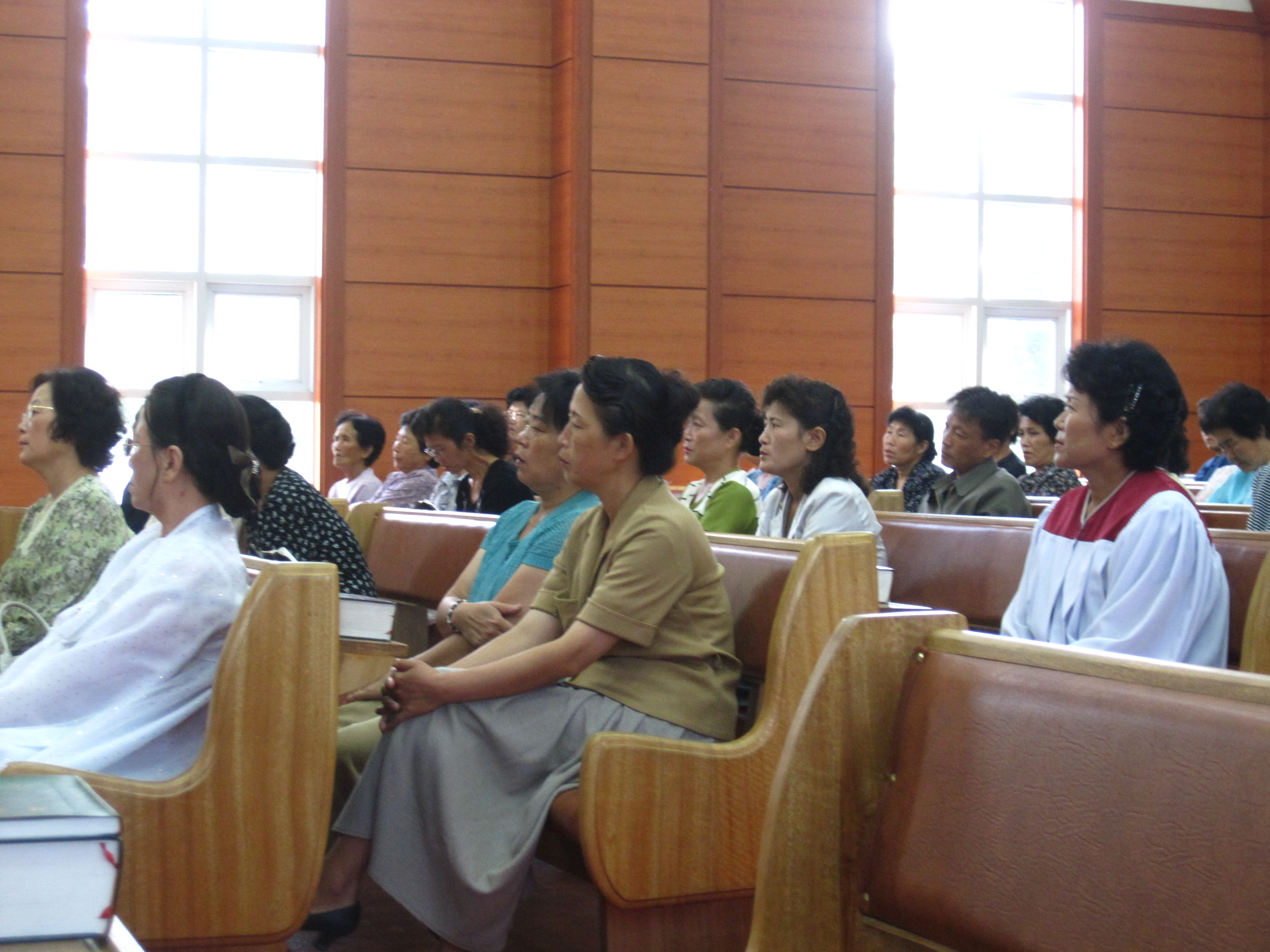
The church seats 1,200 people

Service takes place at 10 am every Sunday. Sometimes tourists have arrived only to find the church closed at that time. Others report that the sermons consist of political rhetoric. Whether or not the local congregation are authentic believers has been debated.

South Korean pastor Soh Kyung-suk describes his observations during visits: "There were little signs of spontaneity during a service. I also found no child in attendance and no Bible study groups there, and we were even banned from talking to North Korean service participants ... What was most startling was that church officials didn't even know any hymns at all."

Bradley K. Martin, author of Under the Loving Care of the Fatherly Leader, also described his visit to the church. The congregation sang "Jesus Loves Me" and many seemed to know it by heart. Preaching and prayer were on political themes such as Korean reunification and nuclear non-proliferation. Churchgoers, according to Martin, were not Workers' Party of Korea members and all of them had removed their Kim Il Sung lapel pins. "This church is a sacred place. We call it the 'house of heaven'. That is why political symbols are not allowed", a church employee explained.

The church is Protestant, but no denomination is specified. It is overseen by the Korean Christian Federation.

The congregation was about 300 strong on Sundays before the church was enlarged due to increase in attendance. Now the church has a 1,200-person capacity. The building has three stories. The church is staffed by a head minister, a vicar, eight elders, five deacons and fourteen deaconesses. The church runs a theological seminary for 12 people, in a separate building in the premises.

The church has an associated noodle factory, and a bakery.

== See also ==
- Chilgol Church
- Changchung Cathedral
- Religion in North Korea
