= Chilgol =

Suburb of Pyongyang, North Korea

Chilgol 칠골
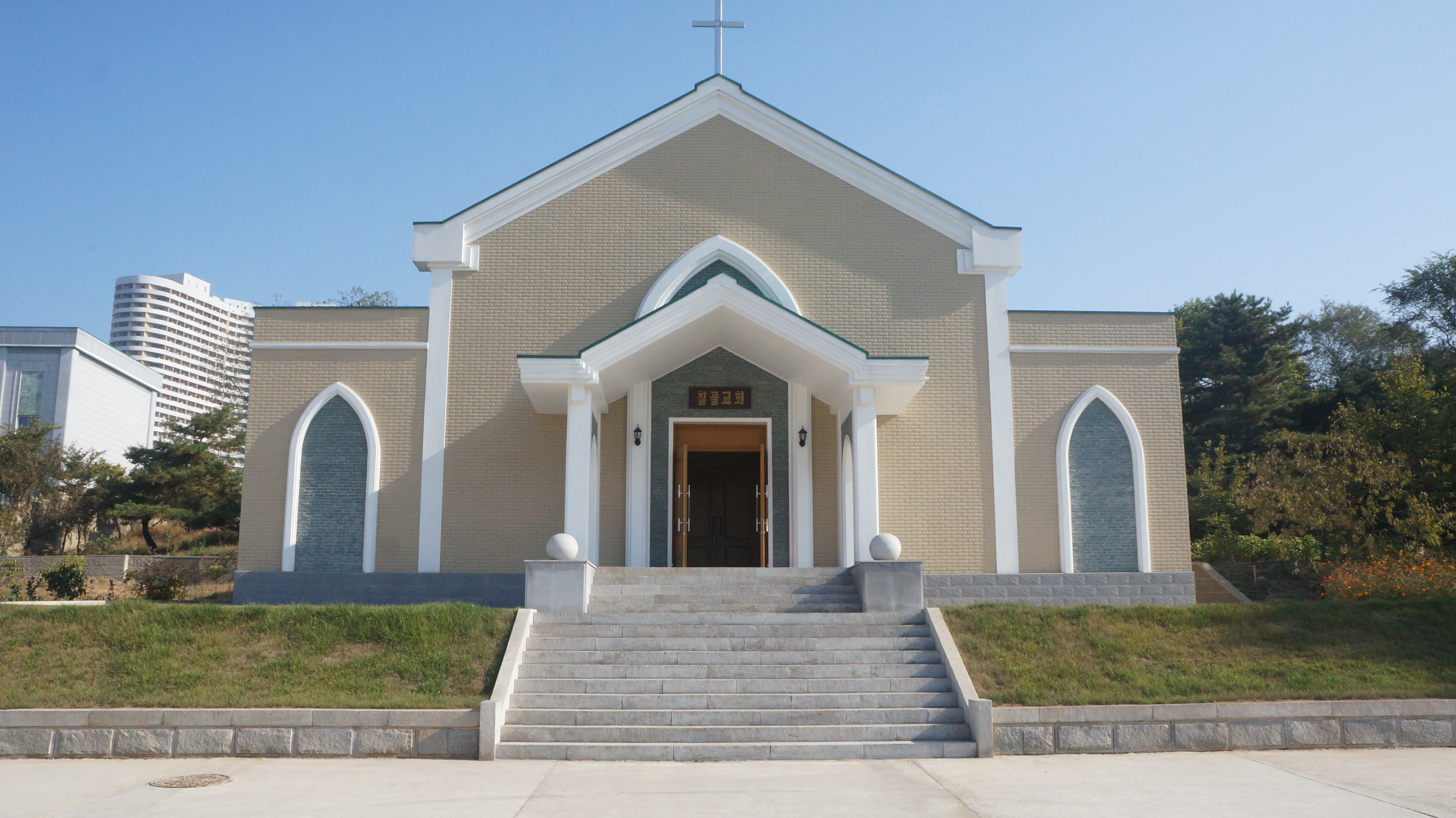
- Chilgol Church
- Country: North Korea
- Direct-administered city: Pyongyang
- Guyŏk (District): Mangyongdae-guyok

Chilgol (Korean: 칠골; Hancha: 七골) is a suburb of Pyongyang in the Mangyongdae District.

Chilgol is known as the place where Kang Pan Sok, the mother of Kim Il Sung, North Korea's first leader, was born in 1892 and spent most of her childhood.

The area also features many buildings and fixtures related to Kim Il Sung's life. Kim attended Changdok School in Chilgol between 1923 and 1925. According to legend, Kang Pan Sok's father Kang Ton-uk founded the school, although in reality it had been established by the missionary Samuel A. Moffett. Kim Il Sung's desk, in the front of the classroom and left of the teacher, remains preserved there.

There are statues for Kim Il Sung, Kang Pan Sok, and Kang Ton-uk, and a marked spot where Kim Il Sung used to read among the trees outside. Also on the premises is Chilgol Church, which Kang Pan Sok used to attend, sometimes with Kim Il Sung, and Chilgol Museum of Revolutionary History. The museum houses Kang Pan Sok's possessions including kitchen utensils. Kang Pan Sok Senior Middle School in Chilgol is named after her.

Although Mangyongdae, also in Pyongyang, is traditionally considered the birthplace of Kim Il Sung, he wrote in his memoirs that he was in fact born in Chilgol where Kang Pan Sok had gone to give birth.

Chilgol is designated as a "revolutionary site", built up in July 1954. The Namchongang Trading Corporation is based in Chilgol.

== See also ==
- Chilgol Station
- Samuel Austin Moffett
