= Chilgol Church =

Coordinates: 39.031907°N 125.675257°E

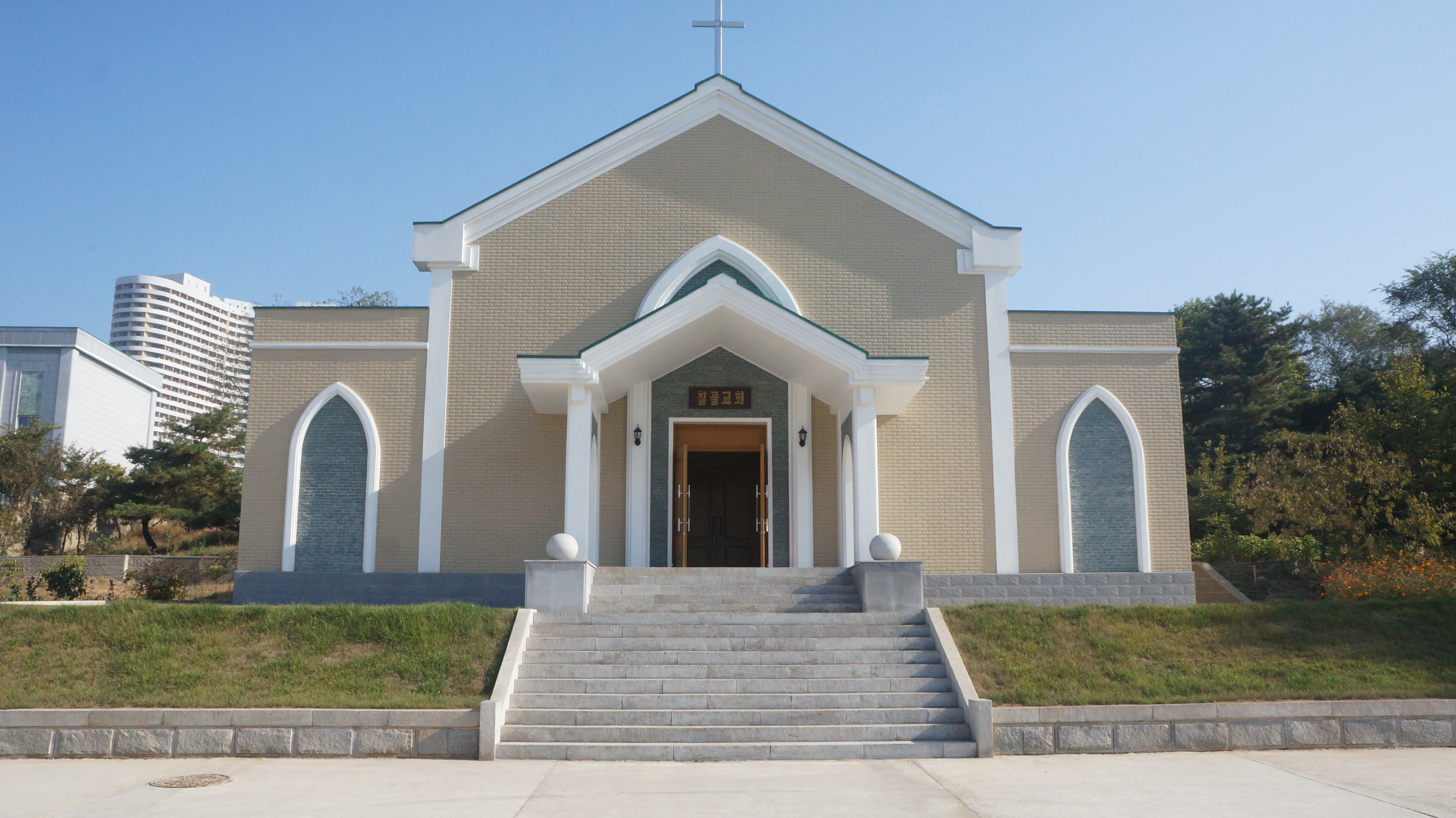
- Entrance of Chilgol Church

- Location within Pyongyang
- Location: Kwangbok Street, Chilgol, Kwangbok, Pyongyang
- Country: North Korea
- Denomination: Protestant

History
- Founded: 1899
- Dedication: Kang Pan-sok

Architecture
- Years built: 1989 (rebuilt)

Administration
- Division: Korean Christian Federation

- Chilgol Church
- Chosŏn'gŭl: 칠골교회
- Hancha: 七골敎會
- Revised Romanization: Chilgol gyohoe
- McCune–Reischauer: Ch'ilgol kyohoe

Chilgol Church (Korean: 칠골교회; MR: Ch'ilgol kyohoe) is a Protestant church on Kwangbok Street, Kwangbok, Chilgol, Pyongyang, North Korea. It is one of two Protestant churches in the country. It is dedicated to Kang Pan-sok, a deaconess in the Presbyterian church who was the mother of North Korea's founding leader Kim Il Sung.

== History ==
The church was founded in 1899. It was attended by Kang Pan-sok, the mother of Kim Il Sung who sometimes accompanied her there.

According to North Korea, the church was destroyed in June 1950 in the beginning of the Korean War in American bombing and Kim Il Sung ordered the church rebuilt on the spot where the original one associated with his mother had stood. The church was rebuilt in its original style in 1989, and placed under the authority of the Korean Christian Federation.

There is a museum devoted to Kang near the church.

== Worship ==
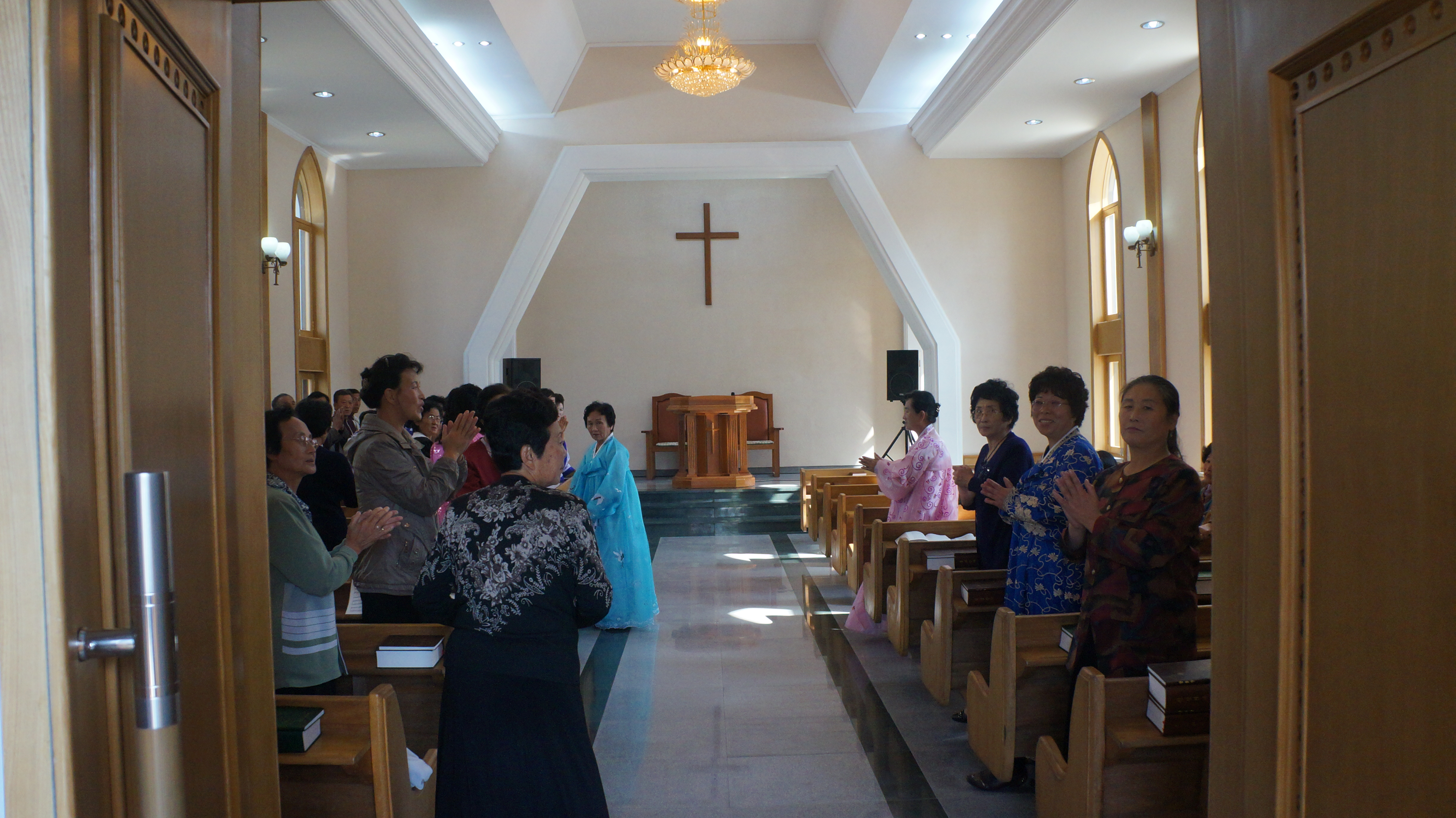
interior of the church

The church welcomes believers on official visits, foreign travellers to Pyongyang, diplomats, and members of international organizations. Morale, patriotism and national unity are celebrated there and prayers are made for the reunification of the country.

The congregation had 201 members in 2015. North Korean defectors from outside Pyongyang have reported that they were not aware of the existence of the church. The church is under lay leadership. Protestant pastors are present in the church, but it is not known if they are resident or visiting pastors.

The church is characterized as Protestant, but a denomination is not specified.

== Politics ==
South Korean missionaries consider the church to be an instrument of state propaganda. South Korean pastor Han Sang-ryeol visited the church on 28 June 2010. His travel to North Korea was not authorized by the government of his home country and he was sentenced to five years in prison upon his return to South Korea.

== See also ==
- Bongsu Church
- Changchung Cathedral
- Religion in North Korea
