= Kang Yong-sop =

North Korean politician

- 강영섭 (康永燮)
- Born: October 15, 1931; Pyongyang
- Died: January 21, 2012 (aged 81); Pyongyang
- Education: Leningrad University
- Occupations: politician, chair of Korean Christian Federation, vice-president of Korean Council of Religionists, vice-chair of North Korean branch of the Pan-Korean Alliance for Reunification, delegate to 12th SPA and member of SPA Presidium, director of Pyongyang Theological Academy
- Parent: Kang Ryang-uk

Kang Yong Sop (Korean: 강영섭; pronounced [kaŋ.jʌŋ.sʌp̚]; October 15, 1931 – January 21, 2012) was a North Korean politician, second son of deputy prime minister Kang Ryang-uk and Song Sok-jong. He served as chair of the Korean Christian Federation (KCF) and vice-president of the Korean Council of Religionists. He was also vice-president of the North Korean branch of the Pan-Korean Alliance for Reunification (PKAR), delegate to 12th Supreme People's Assembly (SPA) and member of the SPA Presidium, and director of the Pyongyang Theological Academy.

== Career ==
In January 1969, Kang was appointed to deputy bureau manager in the Cabinet administrative bureau. He became ambassador to Romania in 1969, and to Malta in 1971.

Kang served as chair of the central committee of the Korean Christian Federation (KCF) starting in February 1989, vice-president of the Korean Council of Religionists starting in May 1989, and chair of the KCF central committee in May 1990. He served as a member of the unification policy committee of the Supreme People's Assembly (SPA) starting in May 1990, and as a member of the central committee of the North Korean branch of the Pan-Korean Alliance for Reunification (PKAR). In March 1991, he was appointed to the directorship of the Pyongyang Theological Academy.

Starting in July 1991, he served as vice-president of the DPRK-Japan Friendship Association, and as a member of the central committee of the Democratic Front for the Reunification of the Fatherland. He became vice-chair of the PKAR in August 1993, and served as deputy chair of the North Korean committee for implementation of the June 15th North–South Joint Declaration. He died in Pyongyang of a heart attack on January 21, 2012.

After being elected to the 9th Supreme People's Assembly in April 1990, Kang served in the 10th (1998), 11th (2003), and 12th (2009) sessions of the SPA as delegate and member of the SPA Presidium. He was a member of the national mourning committees for the deaths of Kim Il Sung in 1994, Ri In-mo in 2007, and Pak Song-chol in 2008.

== Awards ==
Kang was awarded the Order of Kim Il Sung in March 2002, and the National Reunification Prize in September 2003.
