= National Council of Churches in Korea =

Christian ecumenical group

The National Council of Churches in Korea (Korean: 한국 기독교 교회 협의회; NCCK) is a non-Catholic Christian ecumenical organization founded in Korea in 1924 as the National Christian Council in Korea. It is a member of the World Council of Churches and the Christian Conference of Asia.

== History ==
The National Council of Churches in Korea (NCCK) began as the Choseon National Christian Council in 1924 and worked to spread the Gospel and strengthen church solidarity after Korea gained independence in 1945. Post-Korean War, the NCCK collaborated with world churches to reconstruct society. In the 1960s and 70s, it focused on missions for marginalized people, human rights protection, and supported pro-democracy movements, opposing dictatorial and military regimes. Since the 1980s, the NCCK has worked with the Korean Christian Federation in North Korea to strive for national reunification.

== Member churches ==
There are now 9 member churches in the National Council of Churches in Korea:

- Anglican Church of Korea
- Assembly of God of Korea
- Lutheran Church in Korea
- Korea Evangelical Church
- Korean Methodist Church
- Korean Orthodox Church
- Presbyterian Church in the Republic of Korea
- Presbyterian Church of Korea (TongHap)
- The Salvation Army in Korea

== See also ==
- Christian Council of Korea
- Christianity in Korea
- Korean Christian Federation
