= Songyo-guyok =

Coordinates: 38°59′49″N 125°46′17″E

Sŏn'gyo-guyŏk
- Guyŏk of Pyongyang

Korean transcription(s)
  - Hangul: 선교구역
  - Hanja: 船橋區域
  - Revised Romanization: Seongyo-guyeok
  - McCune–Reischauer: Sŏn'gyo-guyŏk
- Location of Songyo-guyok within Pyongyang
- Country: North Korea
- Direct-administered city: P'yŏngyang-Chikhalsi
- Administrative divisions: 9 dong, 9 ri

Area
  - Total: 9.2 km^{2} (3.6 sq mi)

Population (2008)
  - Total: 148,209
  - Density: 16,000/km^{2} (42,000/sq mi)

Sŏn'gyo-guyŏk or Songyo District is one of the 19 guyok which constitute the city of Pyongyang, North Korea. It is on the eastern bank of the Taedong River at the center of East Pyongyang. It is bordered to the south by Nakrang-guyok, to the north by Tongdaewon-guyok and to the east by Ryokpo and Sadong-guyoks. It was established in September 1959.

== Administrative divisions ==
Songyo-guyok is divided into nine administrative districts known as dong. Most of the districts are further divided into separate numbered sections for administrative purposes.

- Namsin-dong (2 administrative dong)
  (남신동/南新洞)
- Changch'ung-dong (2 administrative dong)
  (장충동/長忠洞)
- Ryulgok-tong (2 administrative dong)
  (률곡동/栗谷洞)
- Taehŭng-dong
  (대흥동/大興洞)
- Yŏngje-dong
  (영제동/永濟洞)
- Tŭngme-dong (3 administrative dong)
  (등메동/등메洞)
- Sŏn'gyo-dong (3 administrative dong)
  (선교동/船橋洞)
- Mujin-dong (2 administrative dong)
  (무진동/武進洞)
- Usme-dong
  (웃메동/웃메洞)
- Kang'an-dong (2 administrative dong)
  (강안동/江岸洞)
- San'op-tong (2 administrative dong)
  (산업동/産業洞)
