= Alice Fish Moffett =

American missionary in Korea (1870–1912)

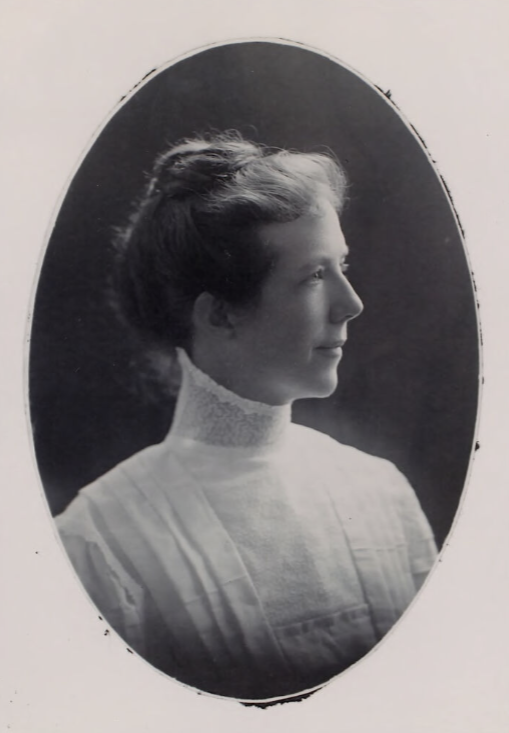
- Born: Mary Alice Fish; April 8, 1870; Virginia City, Nevada
- Died: July 12, 1912 (aged 42); Pyongyang, Korea, Empire of Japan
- Occupations: Physician, medical missionary in Korea
- Spouse: Samuel Austin Moffett

Mary Alice Fish Moffett (April 8, 1870 – July 12, 1912) was an American Presbyterian medical missionary in Korea, with her husband Samuel A. Moffett.

== Early life ==
Mary Alice Fish was born in Virginia City, Nevada, the daughter of Charles Hull Fish and Martha Ann Warner Fish. Her father, a mining company president, was born in New York, and her mother was born in Illinois. Her father was active in Presbyterian mission work in San Rafael, California, teaching Bible classes for Chinese men at the YMCA for over twenty years.

She graduated from Santa Rosa Seminary (also known as Miss Chase's Seminary) in 1890. She earned her medical degree at Cooper Medical College in San Francisco in 1895, and served her residency at the Lying-In Charity Hospital in Philadelphia.

== Career ==
Alice Fish first traveled to Korea in 1897, sponsored by her home church and the Benicia Presbyterial. She worked there as a Presbyterian medical missionary and Bible study teacher until her death in 1912, except for furloughs in 1902, 1906, 1908, and 1910. She reported about her efforts in Korea in Woman's Work, an American church periodical. She married a fellow American missionary, Samuel Austin Moffett, and assisted his work in Pyongyang, as founder of a theological seminary and first president of the Presbytery of Northern Korea. On their visits to the United States, both Moffetts spoke to church groups about their work.

== Personal life ==
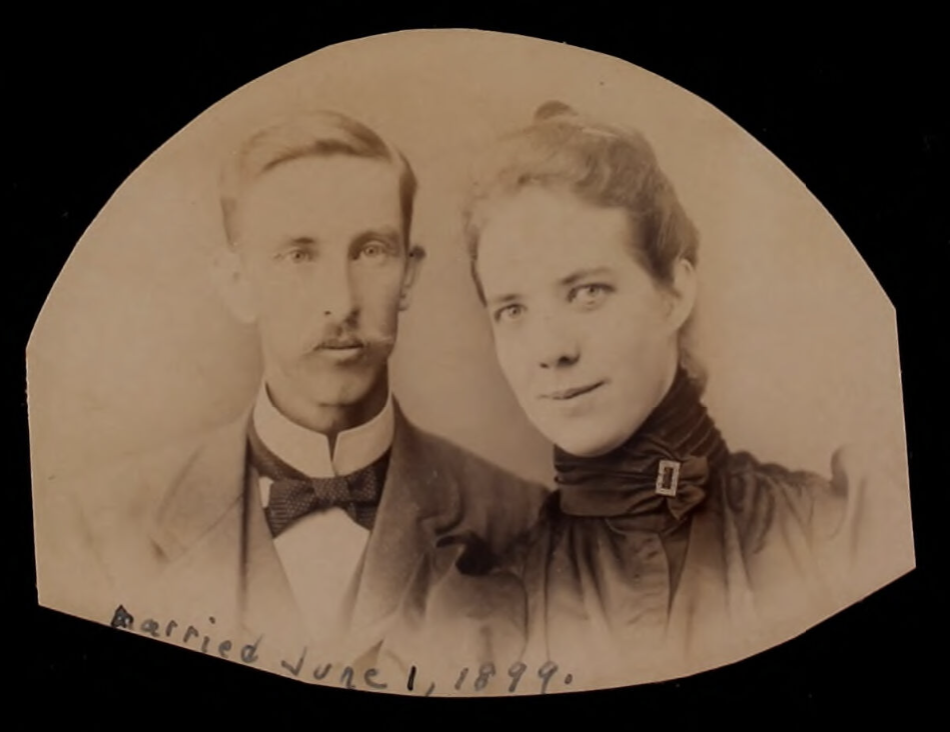
The Moffetts

Mary Alice Fish married Samuel Austin Moffett in 1899, in Seoul. She had two sons, James and Charles, who were young children when she died from dysentery soon after childbirth with a stillborn daughter in 1912, aged 42 years, in Pyongyang.

Moffett's widower remarried in 1915, to her first cousin, Lucia Hester Fish. Both of her sons became Presbyterian ministers, and Charles was a missionary in India for 14 years. The Moffett Korea Collection at the Princeton Theological Seminary includes correspondence involving Alice Fish Moffett.
