= Namchongang Trading Corporation =

Trading company

Namchongang Trading Corporation(Korean: 남천강무역) (also known as Namhung Trading Corporation or Namhung) is a North Korean "trading company subordinate to the General Bureau of Atomic Energy (GBAE)".

According to US officials, it is part of North Korea's "attempts to export its nuclear and long-range missile technologies. These include "a direct role in helping Syria start construction of a nuclear reactor near the Euphrates River that Israeli jets destroyed in 2007" and "Myanmar’s arms industry", and "importing centrifuge equipment that North Korea is using to develop a uranium-enrichment capability".

According to UN officials, it was "involved in the procurement of Japanese origin vacuum pumps that were identified at a DPRK nuclear facility, as well as nuclear-related procurement".

At one time, Yun Ho Jin, who was a former senior North Korea diplomat who served at Pyongyang's mission to the International Atomic Energy Agency, was its leader.

Its headquarters are at Chilgol, Mangyongdae District, Pyongyang, DPRK.
