= Christian Council of Korea =

Alliance of churches in South Korea

- Korean: 한국기독교총연합회
- Founded: 1989; 37 years ago
- Type: Evangelical organization
- Region served: South Korea
- Affiliations: World Evangelical Alliance
- Website: www.cck.or.kr

The Christian Council of Korea (CCK, Korean: 한국기독교총연합회) is a national evangelical alliance in South Korea, member of the World Evangelical Alliance. It has 61 denominations and 20 Christian organizations, which together represent over 12 million people. The organization's purpose is to study, confer, and work together for the accomplishment of the Christian Church's earthly mission, while maintaining the individuality of its members. The president is Pastor Ko Kyung-hwan, who serves as the senior pastor of Sungrak Full Gospel Church and the General Superintendent of the Pentecostal General Assembly of the Korean Assemblies of God.

== History ==
The Christian Council of Korea (CCK) is a coalition organization established in 1989 by conservative and evangelical denominations in South Korea. It was founded under the leadership of Pastor Han Kyung-jik, who served as the chairman of the preparatory committee. The organization emerged as a response to the progressive National Council of Churches in Korea (NCCK), which had criticized the South Korean church’s anti-communist stance, leading to the formation of a conservative and evangelical alliance.

Since its inception, the CCK has been involved in activities such as volunteer work, heresy evaluations, the defense of traditional conservative ethics, North Korean missions, and humanitarian aid. However, from the 2000s onward, it increasingly pursued conservative political influence. Internal conflicts have since intensified, causing a steady decline in its influence. Once considered the leading representative body of conservative Christianity in South Korea, the CCK has now lost much of its representative status.

== Statistics ==
As of 2025, it had 61 denominations and 20 Christian organizations, which together represent over 12 million people.

== Controversies ==
The CCK has undergone a number of controversies. Some of them have centered around accusations of financial mismanagement, bribery and corruption. A former CCK president confessed that "bribery has become the norm in the Christian organization." A Seoul court recently ordered the suspension of the chairman of the CCK for procedural irregularities in electing the head of the umbrella body of Korean Protestant churches. Other Korean pastors have also criticized the CCK for its corruption and infighting. Christian networks and organizations say that the CCK has no ability to purify itself and must be dismantled. The KNACP (Korean National Association of Christian Pastors) spokesman argued that the CCK must be disbanded and that the NCCK (National Council of Churches in Korea), another Christian organization in Korea, must not overlook the allegations of corruption in the CCK.

Other controversies have centered on the conduct of the CCK's heresy investigations. Accusations of heresy have routinely been leveled by CCK member organizations and individuals against other members and individuals, leading to widespread division and confusion amongst Korean churches. The accusations and counter-accusations have been compared to the witch trials conducted by the Catholic Church during the Middle Ages. The CCK's Heresy Committee was accused of becoming effectively a private organization.

Further controversy arose in 2013 around SamKyung Choi, a key leader in the Heresy Committees of the CCK and the Presbyterian Church of Korea, where Choi was accused of trading favorable verdicts in exchange for bribes. The CCK has since expressed its regret over the heresy investigations and has said that it would be willing to reexamine the accusations and verdicts. SamKyung Choi and several pastors associated with him have left the CCK. It was also further revealed that in 2013, in exchange for receiving a loan of 200 million won from Ryu Gwang-soo’s World Evangelization Evangelism Alliance(RUTC), a decision was made to revoke the heretical designation.

== CCIK ==
In 2012, 20 denominations formerly belonging to the CCK created a new organization, the Communion of Churches in Korea (CCIK). In response, the CCK expelled the denominations and pastors who joined the CCIK. The CCIK has in turn leveled accusations of corruption and heresy against the CCK.

In September 2012, the Presbyterian Church of Korea, decided to leave the CCK. Later in the same month, the Korea Evangelical Fellowship also decided to leave the CCK. On Apr, 14, 2014, the Kosin Presbyterian Church in Korea decided to leave the CCK.

Sam Kyung Chae, once vice chair of CCK's Heresy Committee, claimed that over 20 denominations have broken away from CCK to join the CCIK due to a heresy trial. However, in 2010, Chae was ousted from the CCK as he too was accused of holding heretical beliefs. The CCK has furthermore denied Chae's claims of the breakaway, stating, "No denominations have left the CCK over this issue."

Despite the controversies, the CCK has maintained an affiliate relationship with the World Evangelical Alliance (WEA). For instance, in 2011, the CCK and WEA held a joint Thanksgiving ceremony together. However, though the WEA General Assembly was planned to be held in South Korea in 2014, it was postponed due to the internal divisions in the evangelical community in the country. Geoff Tunnicliffe, the CEO and secretary general for the WEA, said that the divisions in question were primarily organizational in nature, and that the CCK understood and agreed with the postponement.
