= Changchung Cathedral =

Catholic church in Pyongyang, North Korea

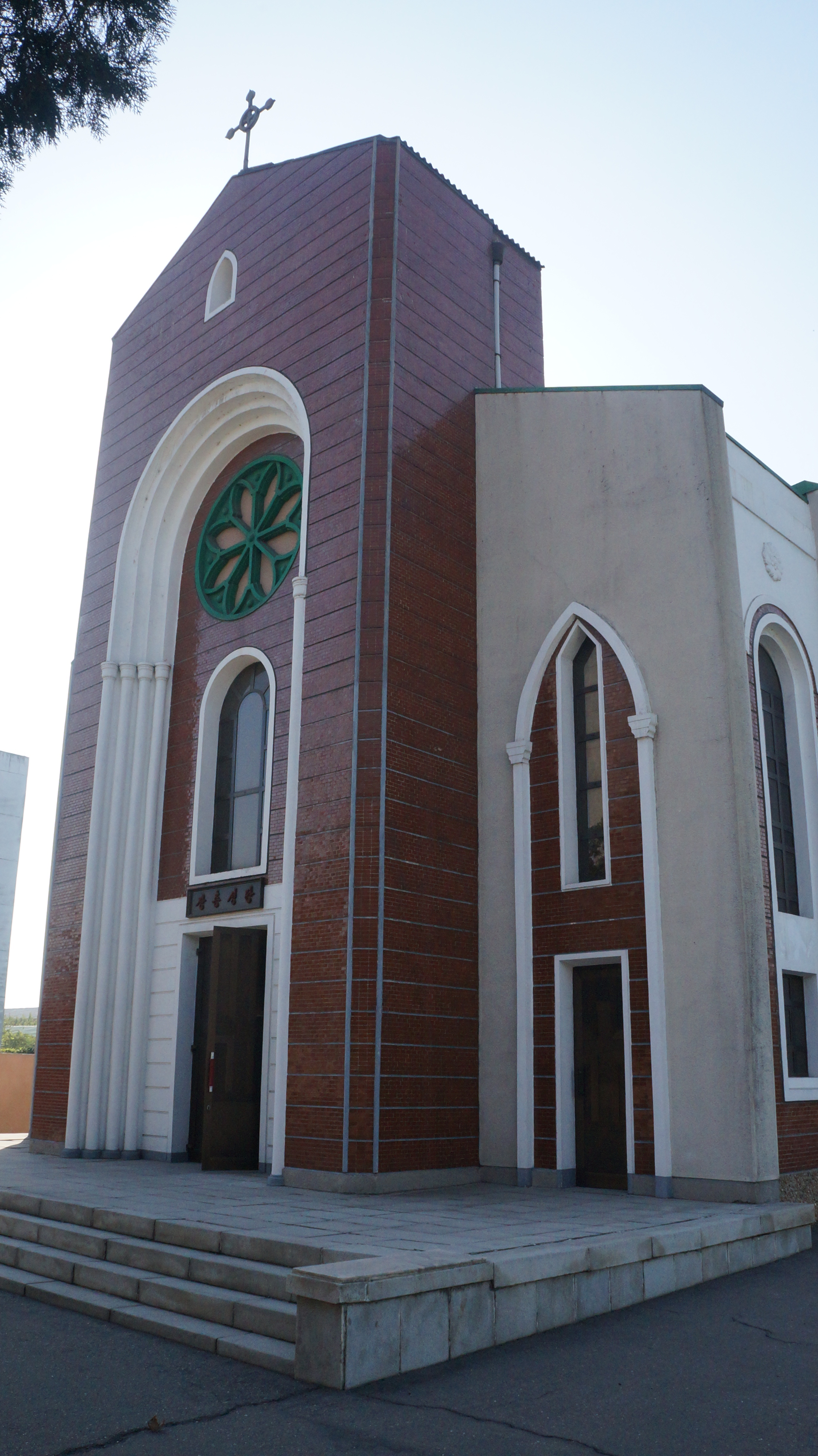
- Exterior of Changchung Cathedral

- Location in Pyongyang

Religion
- Affiliation: Catholic Church
- Province: Pyongyang
- Ecclesiastical or organisational status: Cathedral
- Leadership: Korean Catholic Association
- Status: Sede vacante

Location
- Location: Changchung, Songyo-guyok, Pyongyang, North Korea
- Coordinates: 39°00′25″N 125°46′40″E

Architecture
- Completed: 1988

- Changchung Cathedral
- Chosŏn'gŭl: 장충성당
- Hancha: 長忠聖堂
- Revised Romanization: Jangchung-seongdang
- McCune–Reischauer: Changch'ung-sŏngdang

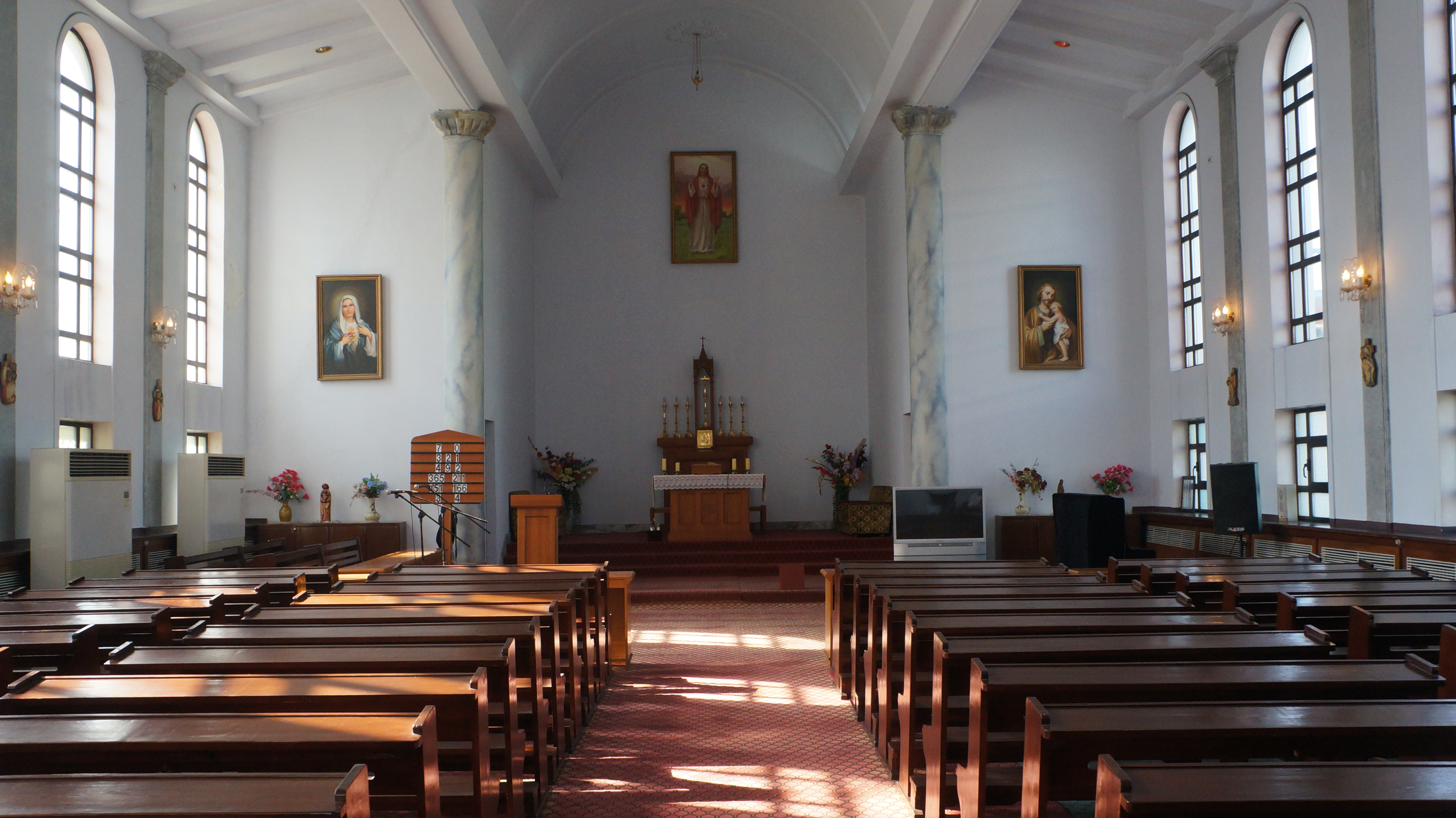
Interior of the Changchung Cathedral

Changchung Cathedral (Korean: 장충성당) is a cathedral in North Korea, operating under the Korean Catholic Association. It is located in the Changchung neighborhood of Songyo-guyok, Pyongyang. It is one of only four official Christian places of worship in Pyongyang. The cathedral is not affiliated with the Diocese of Pyongyang.

== History ==
Before the division of Korea, Pyongyang was the city with the highest number of Christian believers in Korea, and was known as the "Korean Jerusalem". By 1945, nearly 1/6 of its citizens were Christians. Therefore, Pyongyang was made into the only diocese in northern Korea.

After the division of Korea, however, the Communist government under Kim Il Sung persecuted Christians as imperialist collaborators and spies. Much of the Catholic community was either killed or imprisoned, and many more fled south.

The original cathedral, built of red brick in the late 19th century, was destroyed in the Korean War. (Note: According to the government of North Korea every Christian church in North Korea was bombed by the United States.) Earlier, in 1949, the last formal Bishop of Pyongyang, Francis Hong Yong-ho, had been imprisoned by the communist government; he later disappeared. His death was acknowledged by the Holy See in 2013, although the exact date of death is unknown.

In 1988 a new cathedral was opened in East Pyongyang. At the same time, two nondenominational Protestant churches were opened in an effort by the government to show religious freedom.

== Operation ==
The cathedral is operated by the Korean Catholic Association and is not affiliated with the Holy See. Because of the strained relations with the Holy See, the cathedral currently has no bishop or even an ordained priest. There is no resident priest either. Masses are occasionally offered by foreign clergy when they visit Pyongyang. In 2015, an agreement was reached between the Korean Catholic Association and the Catholic Bishops' Conference of Korea, allowing South Korean priests and bishops to celebrate Mass and administer the sacraments in the Cathedral on major feast days.

There is a noodle factory associated with the church that receives financial support from the Roman Catholic Archdiocese of Seoul and Catholic Koreans in the United States.

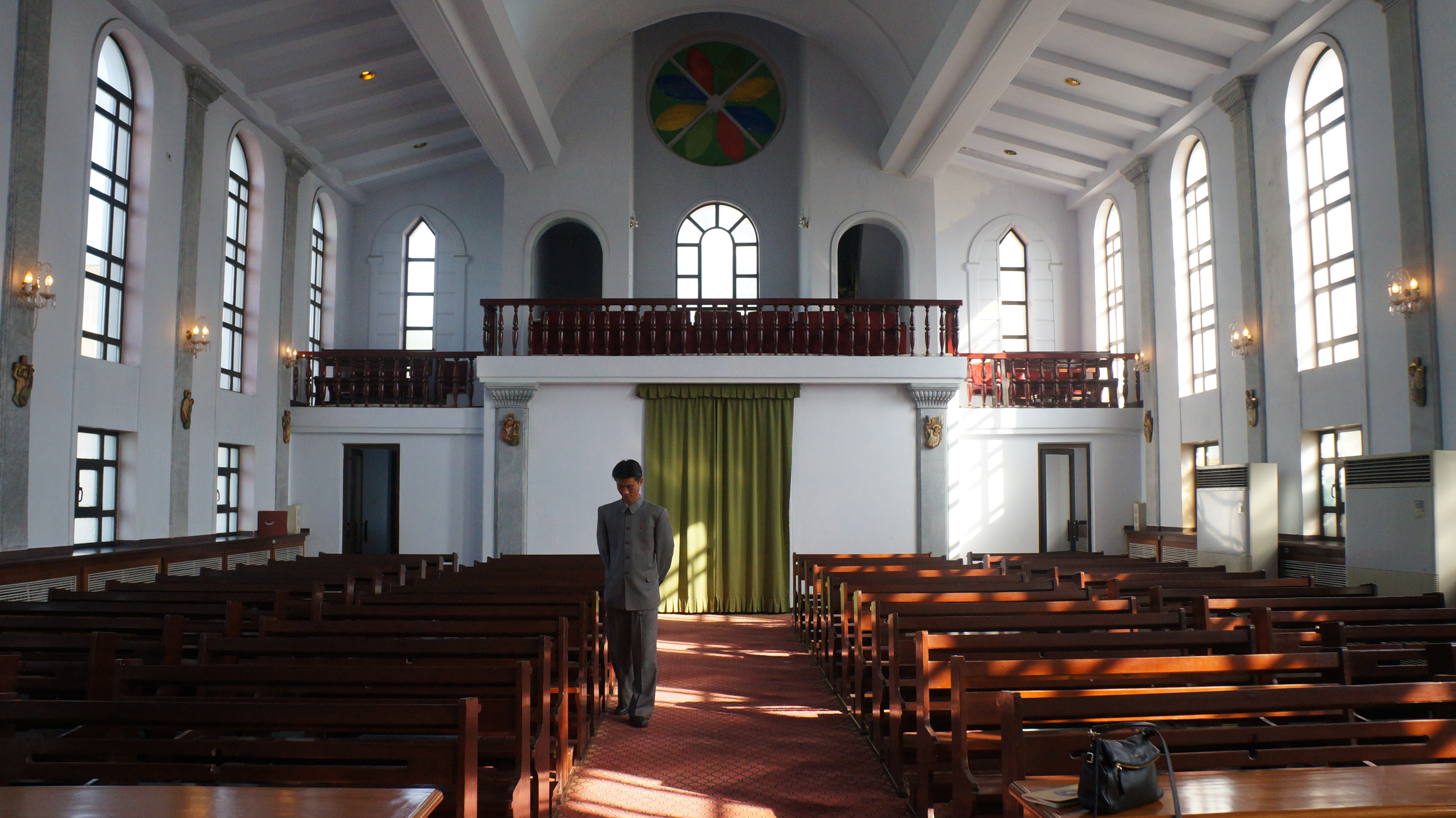
Interior, facing the entrance

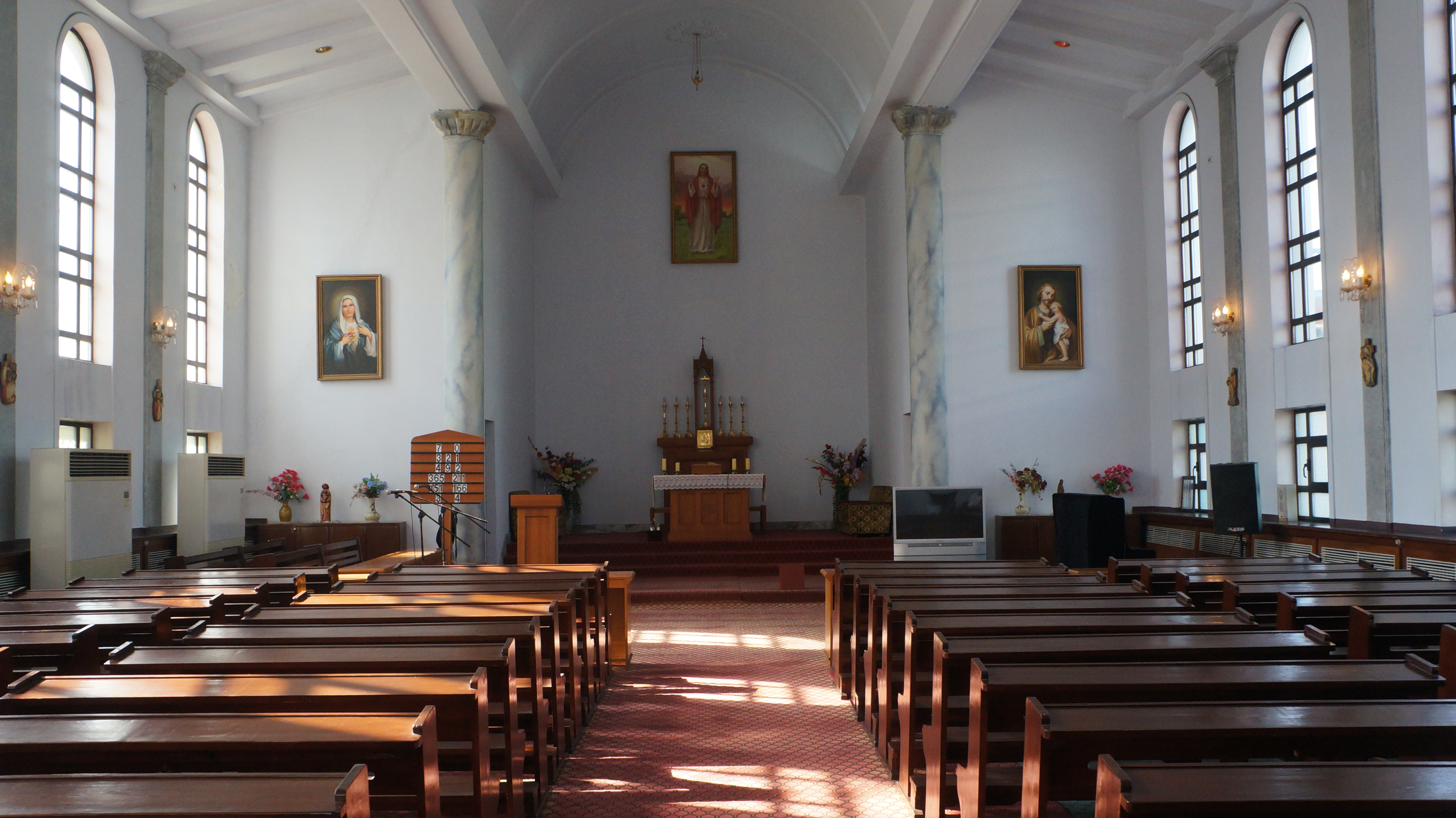
Interior, facing the altar

== See also ==
- Catholic Church in North Korea
- Bongsu Church
- Chilgol Church
- Church of the Life-Giving Trinity
