= Korean Catholic Association =

North Korean organisation

- 조선카톨릭교협회
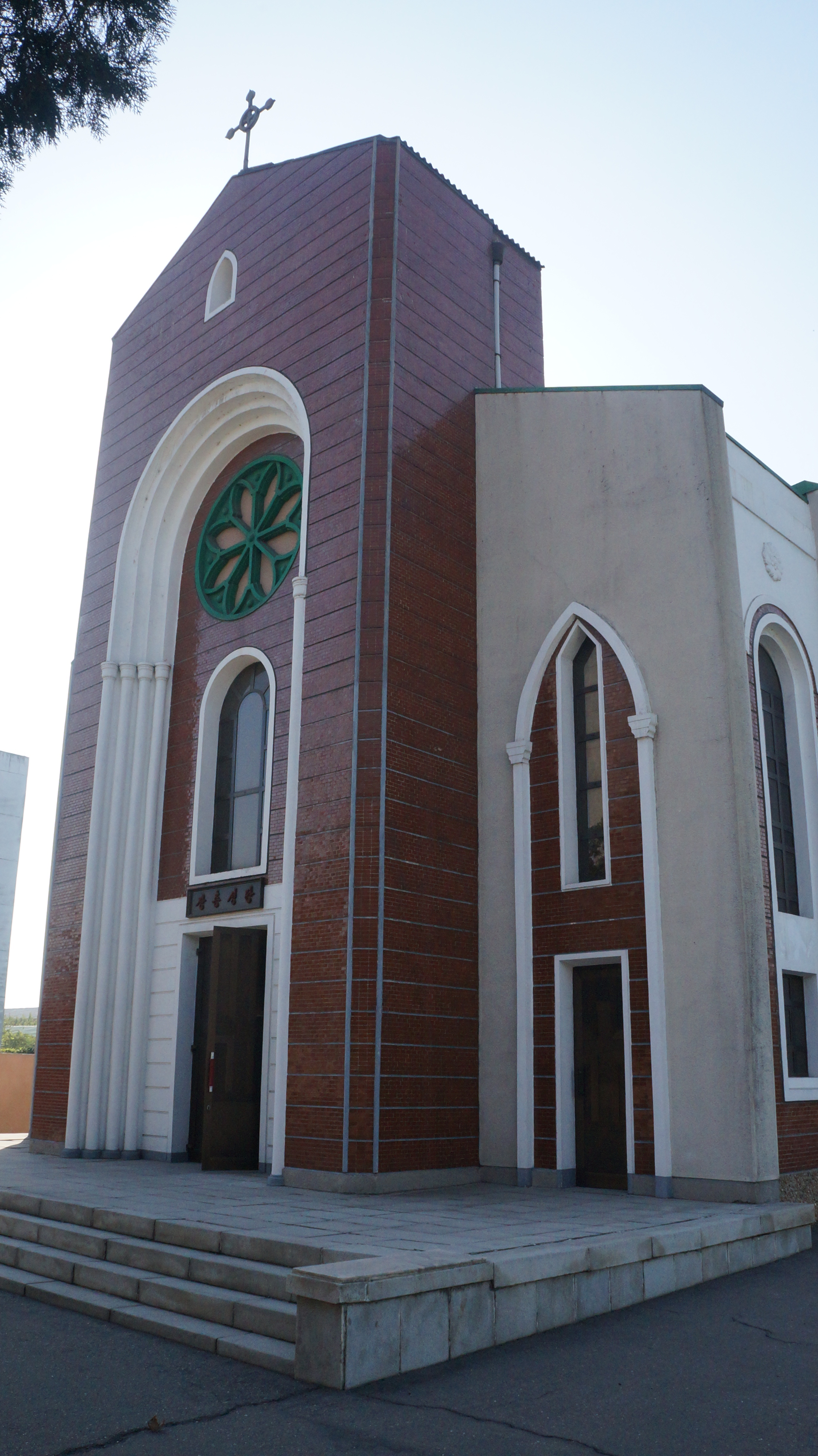
- Photo of the Changchung Catheral
- Abbreviation: KCA
- Founder: North Korean Government
- Location: North Korea
- Official language: Korean
- Chairman: Samuel Jang Jae-on
- Formerly called: 조선천주교인협회

The Korean Catholic Association (Korean: 조선카톨릭교협회 Josŏn khathollik Kyohyŏp-hoe) is an association founded in 1988 that represents the Catholics in North Korea. The association maintains informal contacts with the Holy See, although the association is not recognized by the Vatican. The Korean Catholic Association is controlled by the Workers' Party of Korea and classified as a mass organization. Its chairman is Samuel Jang Jae-on. The association was formerly called 조선천주교인협회 (Josŏn chŏnjugyoin hyŏp-hoe "Association of Korean Catholics"), but was renamed in June 1999.

== History ==
On 30 June 1988, the Korean Catholic Association was established by the government of North Korea. Samuel Chang Jae-on has served as its president since its establishment. In 1991, the association published a catechism and a prayer book. The Jangchung Cathedral was built in 1988 and is operated by the Korean Catholic Association. Its construction has cost 200,000 North Korean won.

In 2005, the Korean Catholic Association sent a message of condolence to the Vatican following the death of Pope John Paul II. An invitation for the Korean Catholic Association to attend a Papal Mass in Seoul on 18 August 2014, during the 4-day visit to South Korea by Pope Francis, was declined by the association.

In 2016, the association issued a statement criticizing the then South Korean president Park Geun-Hye. The statement denounced her supporters using religiously charged language and claimed that the Catholics were united with other citizens in opposition to the South Korean Government.

== See also ==
- Christianity in North Korea
- Catholic Church in North Korea
- Diocese of Pyongyang
- Chinese Patriotic Catholic Association
- Korean Christian Federation
