= Korea Buddhist Federation =

North Korean religious organization

- Chosŏn'gŭl: 조선불교도련맹
- Hancha: 朝鮮佛敎徒聯盟
- Revised Romanization: Joseon-bulgyodo-ryeonmaeng
- McCune–Reischauer: Chosŏn-bulgyodo-ryŏnmaeng

The Korea Buddhist Federation, also called the Chosŏn Buddhist Federation, sometimes abbreviated Chobulyŏn, supervises all activities of Buddhists in North Korea. The organization was founded on 26 December 1946.

In 1999 there were 10,000 Buddhists in North Korea, seventy percent of whom were women, and 60 Buddhist temples.

== History ==
The KBF was established as the North Chosŏn Buddhist General Federation on 26 December 1945. It adopted the current name in 1972. In 1945 and in 1949 the organization adopted a five point and a seven point platforms, respectively, which pledged to uphold the North Korean constitution, eliminate vestiges of Japanese imperialism, assist the army, build friendship with the Soviet Union and other socialist states, work for reunification and "foster the spirit of the working class among Buddhists for the prosperity of the father land and the development of its culture." Little information is available about the Korea Buddhist Federation between 1945 and 1972, other than the names and terms of office of its first and second presidents – Kim Se-ryul (1946–1948) and An Yong-suk (1963–1978). Kim Sunggyŏk was a proxies from 1948 to an undetermined date. This was a period of intense anti-religious propaganda and the Federation was said to have changed its name and gone into hiding several times until 1972.

After the passage of the 1972 North Korean constitution, the policy toward religion softened somewhat. The Korean Buddhist Federation began to make declarations against the repression of Buddhists under the Park Chung-hee regime in the south, such as the arrest of Pastor Pak Hyong-gyo.

In 1989 the KBF opened a Buddhist Academy at their headquarters in the Moranbong district of Pyongyang. The period of study lasts for three years and student are accepted if they have a high school graduation certificate and are recommended by a monastery of one of the KBF’s city or county committees.

== International contacts ==
In 1986 the Federation joined the World Fellowship of Buddhists.

The KBF has been active in establishing contacts with other Buddhist organizations around the world, including the Tokyo-based Korean Buddhists Association in Japan, which is a member organization of the General Association of Korean Residents in Japan (Chongryon). Other contacts have been made with Buddhists in China, India, Nepal, Thailand and Sri Lanka.

In 1976 the KBF joined the Asian Buddhist Committee for Peace. It joined the Asia Buddhist Conference in 1990, upon the latter's establishment.

== Leadership ==
- Kim Se-ryul (1946–1948)
- An Yong-suk (1963–1978)
- Pak Tae-ho (1978–2005)
- Yu Yong-son (2006–2008)
- Sim Sang-jin (2008–2012)
- Kang Sur-in (2012–)

== See also ==
- Korean Christian Federation
- Buddhist Association of China
- Buddhist Sangha of Vietnam
- Central Spiritual Board of Buddhists of the USSR
- Korean Catholic Association
