= Ch'oe Sangnim =

Korean independence activist (1888–1945)

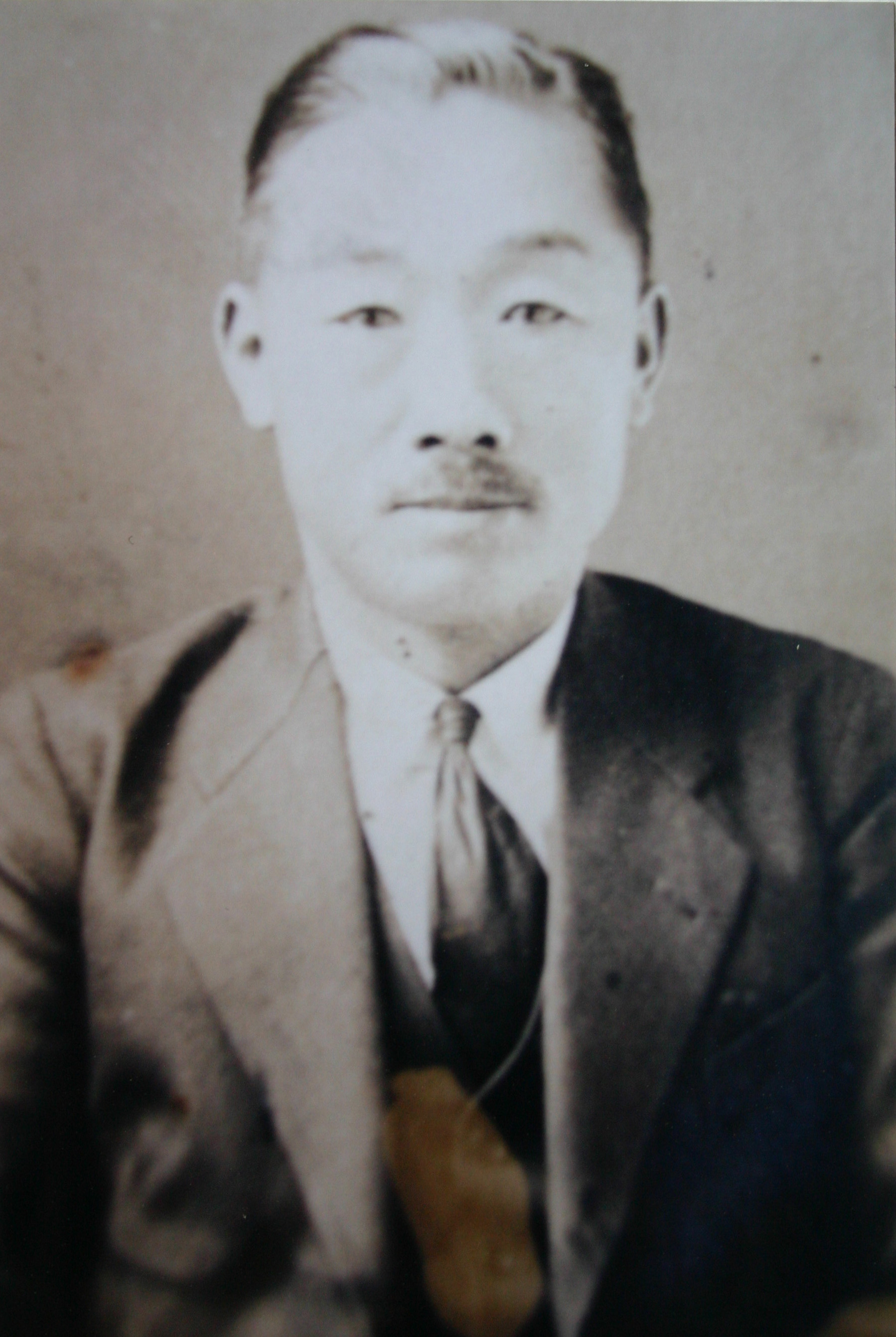

Korean name
- Hangul: 최상림
- Hanja: 崔尙林
- RR: Choe Sangrim
- MR: Ch'oe Sangnim

Ch'oe Sangnim (Korean: 최상림; 17 November 1888 – 6 May 1945) was a Korean independence activist, Presbyterian priest, and educator during the Korea's independence movement.

== Life ==
Born in Gijang County, Dongrae on 17 November 1888, Ch'oe graduated from Pyongyang Missionary School (평양신학교) in 1926, and became a priest for Dongraeeup Church.

In 1933, he moved to Namhaeeup Church, and in 1937 became a President of Gyeongsangnam-do Presbyterian Conference (경상남도노회장).

Starting from October 1938, Ch'oe refused to participate in worship of the Japanese Emperor, which was required by law in the 1930s (see Christianity in Korea: Korean nationalism). He then initiated the movement of antagonism towards Japanese Shinto Shrine worship by focusing on Namhae area.

As the movement of antagonism towards Japanese Shinto Shrine worship was prohibited by the Japanese colonial power during that time, Ch'oe was eventually arrested and remanded in Pyongyang prison along with other anti-Japanese Shrine worship activists.

While still imprisoned, Ch'oe succumbed on 6 May 1945 to the lasting effects he had endured while being tortured. In 1991, the government of South Korea conferred the Order of Merit for National Foundation on Ch'oe Sangnim.

== See also ==
- Christianity in South Korea
