= Korean Christian Federation =

Protestant body in North Korea

- Seal of the Central Committee of the Korean Christian Federation
- Formation: 28 November 1946; 79 years ago
- Purpose: Represents Protestant Christians
- Headquarters: Pyongyang, North Korea
- Secretary General: O Kyong-u

- Korean Christian Federation
- Chosŏn'gŭl: 조선그리스도교련맹
- Hancha: 朝鮮그리스도教聯盟
- Revised Romanization: Joseon Geuriseudogyo Ryeonmaeng
- McCune–Reischauer: Chosŏn Kŭrisŭdogyo Ryŏnmaeng

The Korean Christian Federation is a Protestant body in North Korea founded in 1946. The federation is based in the capital city Pyongyang. The current secretary general is O Kyong-u. The federation has come to play an important role in international relations involving North Korea and religious organizations in South Korea and abroad.

== History ==
The federation was founded on 28 November 1946 by Christians who had joined the ranks of the new communist administration.

Immediately, it declared that it would support the country's leader Kim Il Sung and oppose the formation of the South Korean state. Back then, the organization was led by Kim Il Sung's mother's cousin Kang Ryang-uk. Although Christians in North Korea were mostly anti-communist, about a third of them joined the Korean Christian Federation. Christian leaders who refused to join were imprisoned.

In 1972, the organization reopened Pyongyang theological college. It published Bible translations and a hymnal in 1983 and oversaw the construction of two new church buildings (via state funds) in 1988.

Following the dissolution of the USSR, the federation has come to play an important role in international relations involving North Korea and religious organizations in South Korea and abroad, particularly in procuring international aid. For example, it has successfully called on the World Council of Churches to organize aid for North Korea. The federation has also been involved in promoting Korean reunification, including a 2014 joint North and South church service organized around themes of peace and reunification.

== Organization ==
The federation is "under close government supervision". The federation itself restricts certain Christian activities. Officially, the institution comprises 10,000 North Korean Christians.

The federation oversees North Korea's two Protestant churches: Bongsu and Chilgol Church, in Pyongyang. It also operates the Pyongyang Theological Seminary. The current secretary general of the organization's central committee is O Kyong-u.

== See also ==
- Christianity in North Korea
- Three-Self Patriotic Movement – state authorized Protestant body in China
- Korea Buddhist Federation
- National Council of Churches in Korea
- Korean Catholic Association
