= Samuel Austin Moffett =

American missionary in Korea (1864–1939)

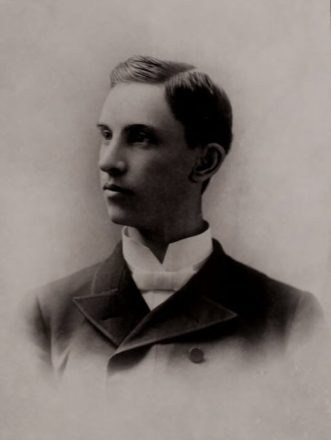
- Moffett in 1889
- Born: January 25, 1864; Madison, Indiana, U.S.
- Died: October 24, 1939 (aged 75); Monrovia, California, U.S.
- Education: Hanover College, McCormick Theological Seminary
- Spouses: Mary Alice Fish (m. 1899; died 1912) Lucia Hester Fish (m. 1915)
- Children: James McKee Moffett; Charles Hull Moffett; Samuel Hugh Moffett; Howard Fergus Moffett; Thomas Fish Moffett
- Parent(s): Samuel Shuman Moffett; Maria Jane McKee Moffett

- Samuel Austin Moffett
- Hangul: 마포삼열
- Hanja: 馬布三悅
- Revised Romanization: Mapo Samyeol
- McCune–Reischauer: Map'o Samyŏl

Rev. Samuel Austin Moffett (1864–1939, Korean: 마포삼열; Hanja: 馬布三悅) was one of the early American Presbyterian missionaries to Korea.

He studied at Hanover College, Indiana, and in 1888 at McCormick Theological Seminary in Chicago. In 1889, he was appointed a missionary to Korea by the Presbyterian Church and arrived at Seoul. He moved to Pyongyang to focus on the ministry in the northern part of Korean peninsula. In 1901 he began a theological class with two students meeting in his home. Later, the institution founded by Moffett split, and became the Presbyterian University and Theological Seminary in Seoul, and the Presbyterian Theological Seminary in Pyongyang. Prior to the split, Moffett served as the president for 17 years and as a member of its faculty until 1935. He served for 46 years before being forced out by the Japanese occupiers who considered him as a harmful influence against their colonization policy. Moffett was also the third president of Soongsil University.

He returned to the United States in 1936 and died in 1939 at his home in Monrovia, California.

== Family ==
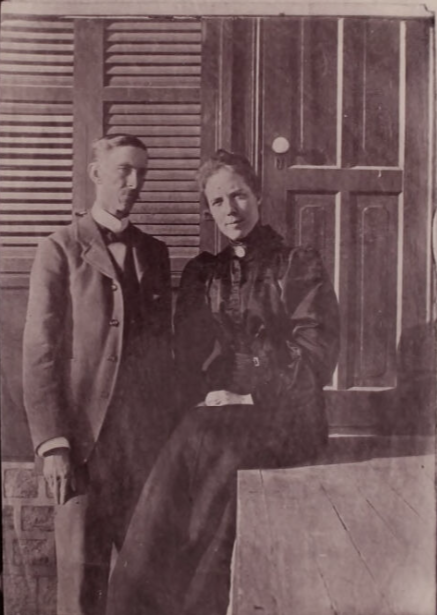
Moffett and Fish. c. 1899

Moffett married Dr Alice Fish in 1899 and they had two sons; after her death, Moffett married her cousin Lucia Fish and they had three sons. Moffett and Lucia were the parents of Samuel Hugh Moffett who worked as a missionary in South Korea.
