= Samuel H. Moffett =

American Christian missionary and historian (1916–2015)

Samuel Hugh Moffett (April 7, 1916 – February 9, 2015) (Korean: 마삼락(馬三樂) 또는 마포삼락(馬布三樂), Chinese: 莫菲特) was an American Christian missionary and academic who latterly served as professor emeritus at the Princeton Theological Seminary. He was regarded as a leading scholar on Christianity in Asia, and was the author of numerous publications, including the two-volume series of A History of Christianity in Asia.

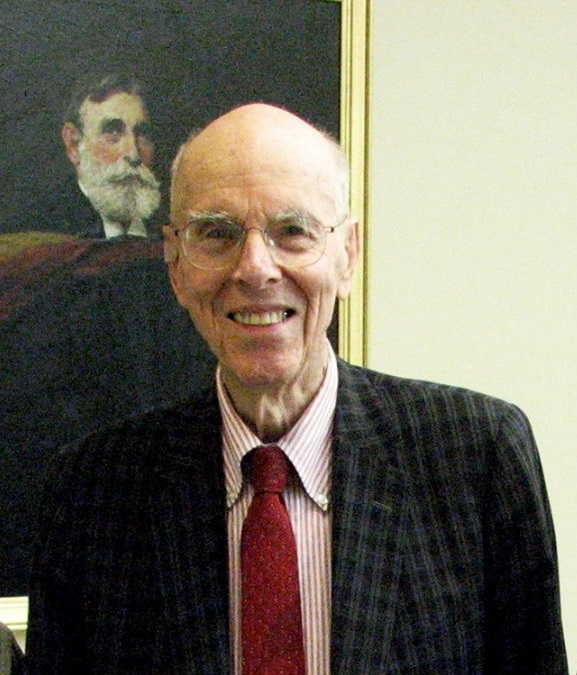
마삼락 선교사 (Samuel H. Moffett)

== Biography ==
He was the child of Samuel Austin Moffett and Lucia Fish; he was the third of five sons born to his father. He was raised on the Korean Peninsula while his parents were serving as missionaries in Pyongyang (now the capital of North Korea) when he was born in 1916. His father lived and worked in Pyongyang from 1890 to 1936.

Moffett followed in his parents footsteps, both in his spiritual life and his regional work. After graduating from Wheaton College and Princeton Theological Seminary in 1942, he completed a Ph.D. in history at Yale University. He began a career in the ministry, and later returned to Princeton as a faculty member at the Seminary from 1953–1955. In 1955, he and his new wife Eileen moved to South Korea to work as missionaries, beginning in the rural area of Andong. He remained a professor and dean of the graduate school with Princeton, and became the co-president of the Korean Presbyterian Seminary. While in Korea, he was appointed the director of the Asian Center for Theological Studies and Mission from 1974 to 1981. Following that, he returned to the campus of his alma mater, Princeton Theological Seminary, as Henry Winters Luce Professor of Ecumenics and Mission from 1981–1987.

Moffett died at his home in Princeton, New Jersey on February 9, 2015 at the age of 98.

== Works ==
- Moffett, Samuel H. (1998). A History of Christianity in Asia: Vol. I: Beginnings to 1500. Orbis Books. ISBN 9781608331628
- Moffett, Samuel H. (2005). A History of Christianity in Asia: Vol II: 1500-1900. Orbis Books. ISBN 9781570754500
