= Religion in North Korea =

Religion in North Korea (2020 census)
1. Agnosticism (58.0%)
2. Atheism (15.0%)
3. Chondoism (13.0%)
4. Musok (12.0%)
5. Buddhism (1.50%)
6. Other religions (0.50%)

There are no known official statistics of religions in North Korea. Officially, North Korea is an atheist state, although its constitution guarantees free exercise of religion, provided that religious practice does not introduce foreign forces, harm the state, or harm the existing social order. Based on estimates from the late 1990s and the 2000s, North Korea is mostly irreligious, with the main religions being Shamanism and Chondoism. There are small communities of Buddhists and Christians. Chondoism is represented in politics by the Party of the Young Friends of the Heavenly Way, and is regarded by the government as Korea's "national religion" because of its identity as a minjung (popular) and "revolutionary anti-imperialist" movement.

== History ==
=== Before 1945 ===
In ancient times, most Koreans believed in their indigenous religion socially guided by mu (shamans). Buddhism was introduced from the Chinese Former Qin state in 372 to the northern Korean state of Goguryeo, and developed into distinctive Korean forms. At that time, the Korean peninsula was divided into three kingdoms: the aforementioned Goguryeo in the north, Baekje in the southwest, and Silla in the southeast. Buddhism reached Silla only in the 5th century, but it was made the state religion only in that kingdom in the year 552. In Goguryeo, the Korean indigenous religion remained dominant, while Buddhism became more widespread in Silla and Baekje (both areas comprehended in modern South Korea).

In the following unified state of Goryeo (918–1392), that developed from Goguryeo incorporating the southern kingdoms, Buddhism flourished even becoming a political force. In the same period, the influence of Chinese Confucianism penetrated the country and led to the formation of Korean Confucianism that would have become the state ideology and religion of the following Joseon state.

The Joseon kingdom (1392–1910), strictly Neo-Confucian, harshly suppressed Buddhism and Shamanism. Buddhist monasteries were destroyed and their number dropped from several hundreds to a mere thirty-six; Buddhism was eradicated from the life of towns as monks and nuns were prohibited from entering them and were marginalised to the mountains. These restrictions lasted until the 19th century.

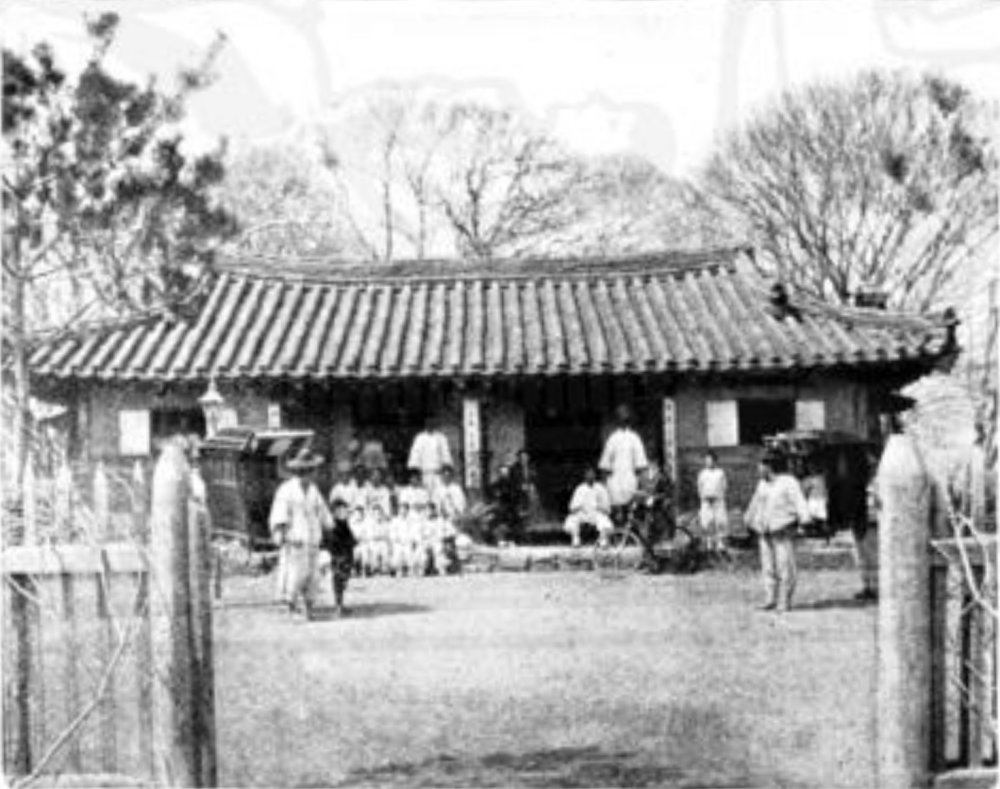
A Protestant church at Sorae (now Ryongyon County, South Hwanghae Province) in 1895

In this environment, Christianity began to rapidly gain foothold since the late 18th century, due to an intense missionary activity that was aided by the endorsement at first by the Silhak and Seohak intellectual parties, and then at the end of the following century by the king of Korea himself and the intellectual elite of the crumbling Joseon state, who were looking for a new social factor to invigorate the Korean nation. In the late 19th century, the Joseon state was politically and culturally collapsing. The intelligentsia was looking for solutions to invigorate and transform the nation. It was in this critical period that they came into contact with Western Protestant missionaries who offered a solution to the plight of Koreans. Christian communities already existed in Joseon, however it was only by the 1880s that the government allowed a large number of Western missionaries to enter the country. Protestant missionaries set up schools, hospitals and publishing agencies. The king of Korea and his family tacitly supported Christianity. From the late nineteenth century, the northwest of Korea, and Pyongyang in particular, became a stronghold of Christianity. As a result, Pyongyang was called the "Jerusalem of the East".

At the dawn of the 20th century, almost the totality of the population of Korea believed in the indigenous shamanic religion and practiced Confucian rites and ancestral worship. Buddhism was nearly dead, reduced to a minority of monks, despite its long history and cultural influence, because of 500 years of suppression by the ruling Neo-Confucian Joseon kingdom, which also disregarded traditional cults.

During the absorption of Korea into the Japanese Empire (1910–1945) the already formed link of Christianity with Korean nationalism was strengthened, as the Japanese tried to impose State Shinto and Christians refused to take part in Shinto rituals. At the same time, numerous religious movements that since the 19th century had been trying to reform the Korean indigenous religion, notably Chondoism, flourished. Christianity became widespread especially in the north of the peninsula, as did Chondoism which aimed to counter Christian influence.

North Korean revolutionary leader Kim Il Sung's writings address religion in the context of the national liberation struggle against Japan. Kim argued stated that if a religion "prays for dealing out divine punishment to Japan and blessing the Korean nation" then it is a "patriotic religion" and its believers are patriots and that in the context of a struggle for national salvation against Japan, religionists who share the agenda of liberation must be welcomed into the ranks. Kim criticized the Protestant Christian creed, stating that while "[t]here is no law preventing religious believers from making the revolution," the lack of action led to "non-resistance" and psalms alone could not block the Japanese guns when "decisive battles" were necessary.

=== After the division ===
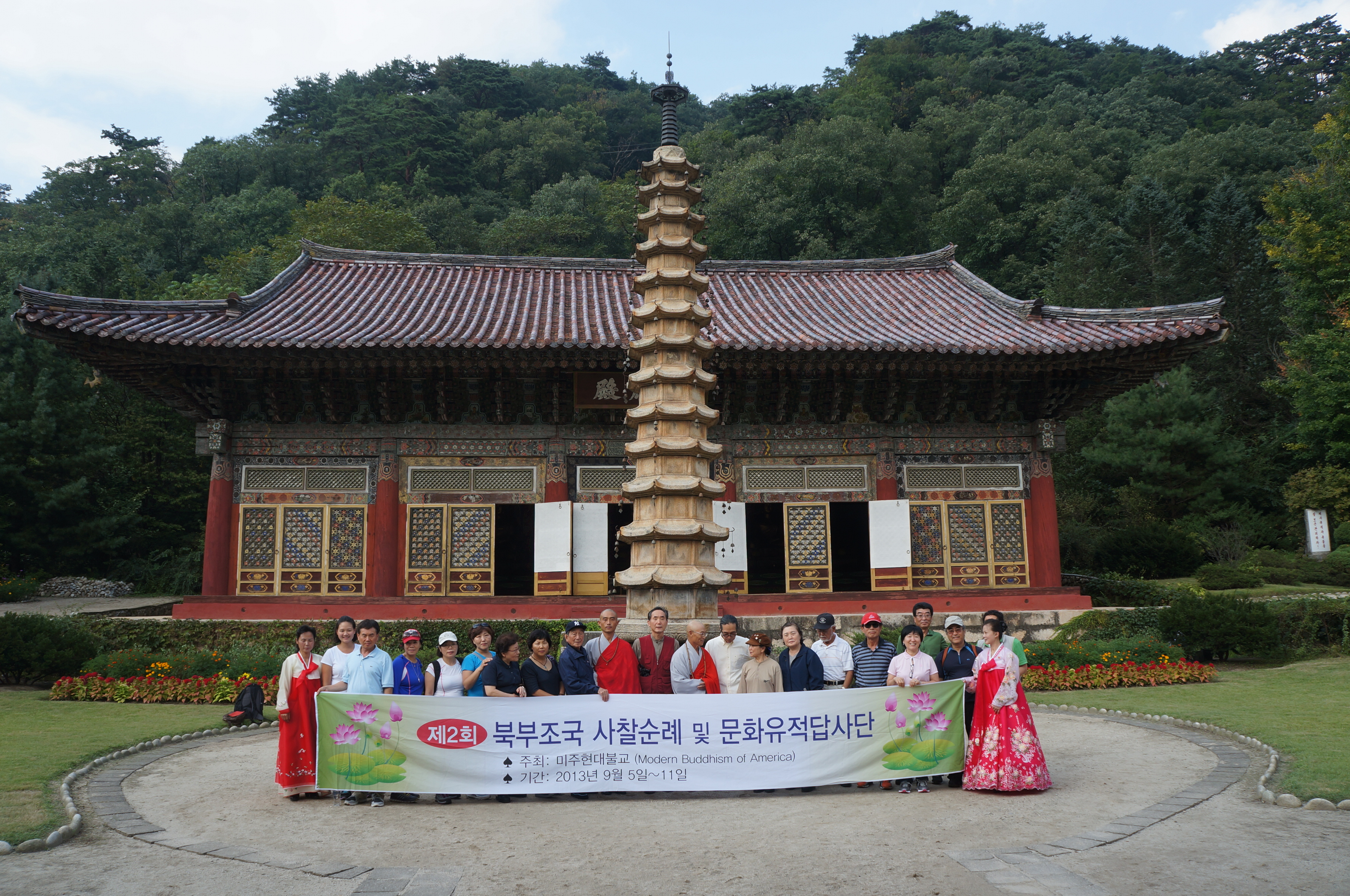
Delegation of the group "Modern American Buddhism", of Korean Americans in New York City, at Pohyonsa in 2013

The Korean Peninsula was divided into two states in 1945, the communist north and the capitalist south. Most of the Korean Christians, that had been until then in the northern half of the peninsula, fled to South Korea. By contrast, most of Korean Chondoists remained in the newly formed North Korea. At the time of the partition they were 1.5 million, or 16% of North Korea's population. They participate to the politics of North Korea through the Party of the Young Friends of the Heavenly Way.

North Korean leader Kim Il Sung attributed the relative lack of religious practice in the north partly as a result of the bombing campaigns of the United States in the Korean War, which destroyed places of worship, crucifixes, icons, and Bibles: "believers were killed and passed into the world beyond." Kim recounted that believers saw their places of worship destroyed by Christians, and that Koreans in the north found their faith "powerless in shaping the destiny of human beings." In his analysis, Kim stated that Koreans in the north focused on rebuilding the country rather than churches, and additionally that the younger generation simply did not believe paradise could be obtained through worship and simply chose not to embrace religion.

After the war, Christians generally organized in house churches or small congregations. In the 1960s, the government permitted two hundred informal congregations in former centers of Christianity.

According to some estimates in 2005 in North Korea there are 3,846,000 (16% of the total population) believers of Shamanists, 3,245,000 (13.5%) Chondoists, 1,082,000 (4.5%) Buddhists, and 406,000 (1.7%) Christians.

In 1994 the Central Guidance Committee of the Korean Chondoist Association organised an impressive ceremony at the newly constructed Mausoleum of Dangun (mythical founder of the Korean nation) near Pyongyang. In 2007 there were approximately 800 Chondoist churches throughout the country and a large central building in Pyongyang, 60 Buddhist temples (maintained more as cultural relics than places of worship), and 5 Christian churches—three Protestant churches, one Catholic church, and one Russian Orthodox church, all of which located in Pyongyang.

In 2014, the Korea Conference of Religions for Peace held an inter-Korean meeting at Mount Kumgang, North Korea, and another took place in 2017 in Pyongyang.

== Religion and politics ==
Although its constitution guarantees freedom of religion in Article 68, the principle is limited by the requirement that religion may not be used as a pretext to harm the state, introduce foreign forces, or harm the existing social order.

=== North Korean anti-religion campaigns and contrary views ===
It is very difficult for outside observers to know what has happened to North Korean religious bodies over the past 60 years due to the extreme isolation of the state. One interpretation has held that all open religious activity in North Korea was persecuted and eradicated after Kim Il-sung took power, only to be revived in the present as part of a political show. Another interpretation has held that religion survived and has genuinely been revived in the past few decades.

Kim Il-sung criticized religion in his writings, and North Korean propaganda in literature, movies and other media have presented religion in a negative light. Kim Il-sung's attack on religion was strongly based on the idea that religion had been used as a tool for imperialists in the Korean peninsula. He criticized Christians for collaborating with the United Nations' forces against him during the Korean War, although he praised Christians who supported him.

Accounts from the Korean War speak of harsh persecution of religion by Kim Il-sung in the areas he controlled. Prior to the war, the Christian population of the Korean peninsula was most heavily concentrated in the north; during the war, many of these Christians fled to the South. Some interpretations have considered that the Christian community was often of a higher socio-economic class than the rest of the population, which may have prompted its departure for fear of persecution. The large-scale destruction caused by the massive air raids and the suffering experienced by North Koreans during the Korean War helped foster hatred of Christianity as being the American religion. It was seen by many Koreans in the north as the religion of the imperialists.

According to a study by Ryu Dae Young, however:

Contrary to the common western view, it appears that North Korean leaders exhibited toleration to Christians who were supportive of Kim Il-sung and his version of socialism. Presbyterian minister Kang Yang Wook served as vice president of the DPRK from 1972 until his death in 1982, and Kim Chang Jun, an ordained Methodist minister, became vice chairman of the Supreme People's Assembly. They were buried in the exalted Patriots' Cemetery, and many other church leaders received national honors and medals. It appears that the government allowed the house churches in recognition of the Christians' contribution to the building of the socialist nation.

Another study by Kim Hwan Soo pointed out that Jaegaseung, a Buddhist community in northeastern Korea, were forced to relinquish their monastic identity under the orders of Kim Il-sung.

Religion was attacked in the ensuing years as an obstacle to the construction of communism, and many people abandoned their former religions in order to conform to the new reality. On the basis of accounts from the Korean War as well as information from defectors, an interpretation has held that the North Korea was the second country (after Albania) to have completely eradicated religion by the 1960s.

Other interpretations have thought that they do represent genuine faith communities that survived the persecutions. An interpretation has considered that these religious communities may have been believers who genuinely adhered to Marxism–Leninism and the leadership of Kim Il-sung, thus ensuring their survival. This interpretation has been supported by recent evidence gathered that has shown that the North Korean government may have tolerated the existence of up to 200 pro-communist Christian congregations during the 1960s, and by the fact that several high-ranking people in the government were Christians and they were buried with high honours (for instance Kang Yang Wook was a Presbyterian minister who served as vice president of North Korea from 1972 to 1982, and Kim Chang Jun was a Methodist minister who served as vice chairman of the Supreme People's Assembly). Differing interpretations often agree on the disappearance of religion under Kim Il-sung in the first few decades of his rule. The government never made an open public policy statement about religion, leading to unresolved speculation among scholars as to what exactly the government's position was at any point in time.

=== Freedom of religion in the 2020s ===
Article 256 of North Korea's criminal law stipulates that anyone who engages in superstitious practices shall be sentenced to a labor discipline camp. Articles 23 and 29 of the Reactionary Ideology and Culture Rejection Act explicitly prohibit the dissemination of superstition.

In 2023, the country was scored zero out of 4 for religious freedom; as of May 2021, Christian Solidarity Worldwide estimated that almost 200,000 people were held in prison camps, mainly due to their Christian beliefs.

In the same year, the country was ranked as the worst place in the world to be a Christian.

== Main religions ==
=== Chondoism ===
Chondoism (천도교 Ch'ŏndogyo) or Cheondoism (South Korean spelling) is a religion with roots in Confucianised indigenous shamanism. It is the religious dimension of the Donghak ("Eastern Learning") movement that was founded by Choe Je-u (1824–1864), a member of an impoverished yangban (aristocratic) family, in 1860 as a counter-force to the rise of "foreign religions", which in his view included Buddhism and Christianity (part of Seohak, the wave of Western influence that penetrated Korean life at the end of the 19th century). Choe Je-u founded Chondoism after having been allegedly healed from illness by an experience of Sangje or Haneullim, the god of the universal Heaven in traditional shamanism.

The Donghak movement became so influential among common people that in 1864 the Joseon government sentenced Choe Je-u to death. The movement grew and in 1894 the members gave rise to the Donghak Peasant Revolution against the royal government. With the division of Korea in 1945, most of the Chondoist community remained in the north, where the majority of them dwelled.

Chondoism is the sole religion to be favoured by the North Korean government. It has political representation as the Party of the Young Friends of the Heavenly Way, and is regarded by the government as Korea's "national religion" because of its identity as a minjung (popular) and "revolutionary anti-imperialist" movement.

=== Korean shamanism ===
Korean shamanism, also known as "Muism" (무교 Mugyo, "mu [shaman] religion") or "Sinism" (신교 Singyo, "religion of the shin (Hanja: 神) [gods]"), is the ethnic religion of Korea and the Koreans. Although used synonymously, the two terms are not identical: Jung Young Lee describes Muism as a form of Sinism – the shamanic tradition within the religion. Other names for the religion are "Sindo" (신도 "Way of the Gods") or "Sindoism" (신도교 Sindogyo, "religion of the Way of the Gods"). (Note: Cognates of Japanese Shinto and Chinese Shendao.)

In contemporary Korean language the shaman-priest or mu (Hanja: 巫) is known as a mudang (Korean: 무당; Hanja: 巫堂) if female or baksu if male, although other names and locutions are used. (Note: Another term is dangol (Korean: 당골). The word mudang is mostly associated, though not exclusively, to female shamans due to their prevalence in the Korean tradition in recent centuries. Male shamans are named baksu mudang ("healer mudang"), shortened baksu, in Pyongyang shamanism. It is reasonable to believe that the word baksu is an ancient authentic designation for male shamans.) Korean mu "shaman" is synonymous with Chinese wu, which defines priests both male and female. The role of the mudang is to act as intermediary between the spirits or gods, and the human plane, through gut (rituals), seeking to resolve problems in the patterns of development of human life.

Central to the faith is the belief in Haneullim or Hwanin, meaning "source of all being", and of all gods of nature, the utmost god or the supreme mind. The mu are mythically described as descendants of the "Heavenly King", son of the "Holy Mother [of the Heavenly King]", with investiture often passed down through female princely lineage. However, other myths link the heritage of the traditional faith to Dangun, male son of the Heavenly King and initiator of the Korean nation.

Korean Muism has similarities with Chinese Wuism, Japanese Shinto, and with the Siberian, Mongolian, and Manchurian religious traditions. As highlighted by anthropological studies, the Korean ancestral god Dangun is related to the Ural-Altaic Tengri "Heaven", the shaman and the prince. The mudang is similar to the Japanese miko and the Ryukyuan yuta. Muism has exerted an influence on some Korean new religions, such as Chondoism in North Korea. According to various sociological studies, many Christian churches in Korea make use of practices rooted in shamanism as the Korean shamanic theology has affinity to that of Christianity.

In the 1890s, the twilight years of the Joseon kingdom, Protestant missionaries gained significant influence, and led a demonisation of the traditional religion through the press, and even carried out campaigns of physical suppression of local cults. The Protestant discourse would have had an influence on all further attempts to uproot Muism.

There is no knowledge about the survival of Korean shamanism in contemporary North Korea. Many northern shamans, displaced by war and politics, migrated to South Korea. Shamans in North Korea were (or are) of the same type of those of northern and central areas of South Korea (kangshinmu).

== Minor religions ==
=== Buddhism ===
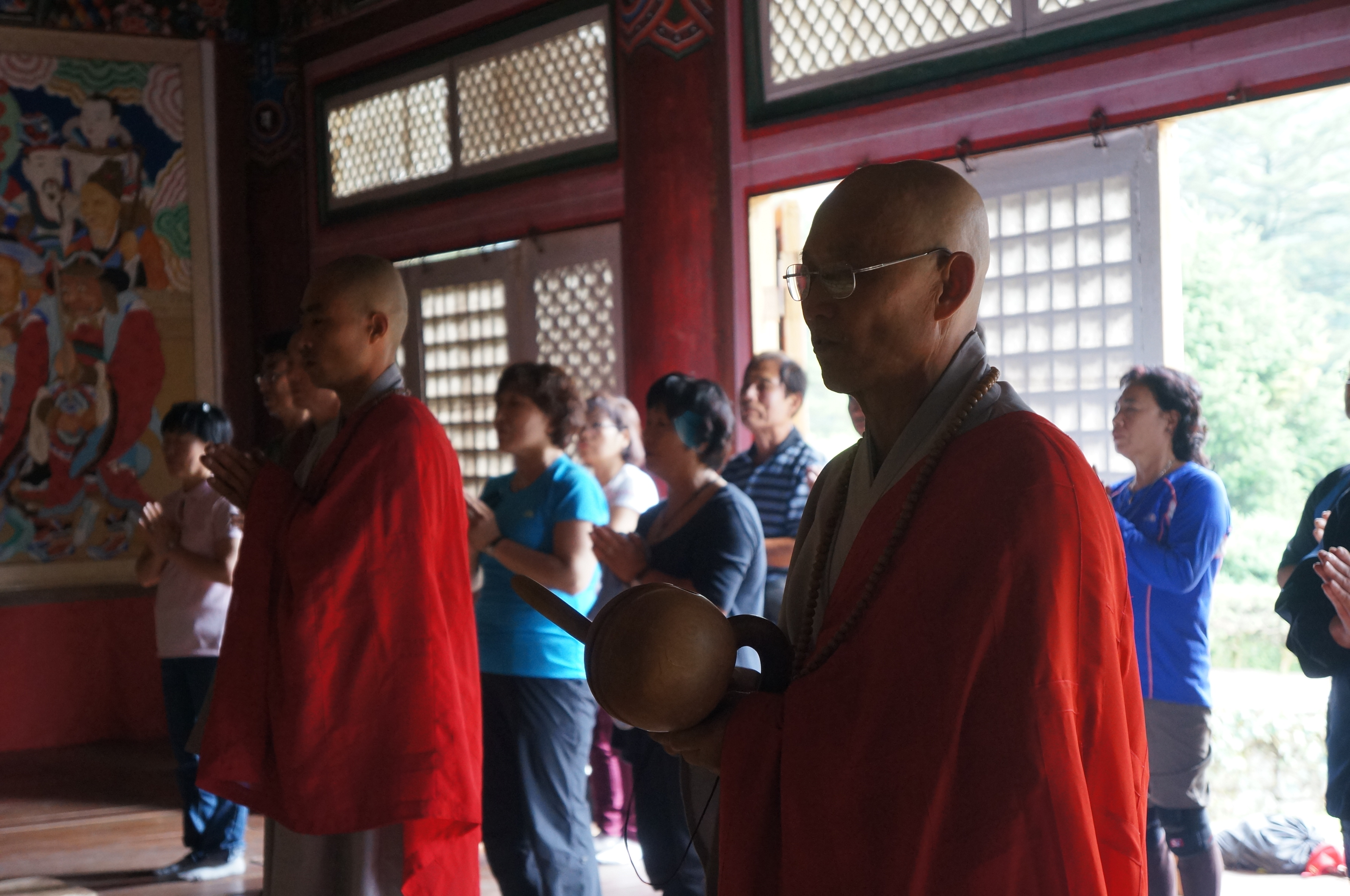
Buddhist service at Pohyon Temple, at Mount Myohyang in Hyangsan County, North Pyongan Province. Note that the lay participants are members of a Korean American Buddhist group visiting the temple.

Buddhism (불교 Pulgyo) entered Korea from China during the period of the three kingdoms (372, or the 4th century). Buddhism was the dominant religious and cultural influence in the Silla (668–935) and subsequent Goryeo (918–1392) states. Confucianism was also brought to Korea from China in early centuries, and was formulated as Korean Confucianism in Goryeo. However, it was only in the subsequent Joseon kingdom (1392–1910) that Korean Confucianism was established as the state ideology and religion, and Korean Buddhism underwent 500 years of suppression, from which it began to recover only in the 20th century.

Buddhists are a minority in North Korea, and their traditions have developed differently from those of South Korean Buddhists after the division of the country. Buddhism in North Korea is practiced under the auspices of the official Korea Buddhist Federation, an organ of the North Korean state apparatus. North Korean Buddhist monks are entirely dependent on state wages for their livelihood as well as state authorization to practice. As of 2009, the leader of the Korean Buddhist Federation is Yu Yong-sun.

There are 60 Buddhist temples in the country, and they are viewed as cultural relics from Korea's past rather than places of active worship. Also, there is a three-year college for training Buddhist clergy. A limited revival of Buddhism is apparently taking place. This includes the establishment of an academy for Buddhist studies and the publication of a twenty-five-volume translation of the Korean Tripitaka, or Buddhist scriptures, which had been carved on 80,000 wooden blocks and kept in the Buddhist temple, Pohyonsa which is located at Myohyangsan in central North Korea. Recently, South Korean Buddhist leaders have been allowed to travel to North Korea and participate in religious ceremonies or give aid to civilians.

Despite the North Korean government's official stance on religion, Buddhism along with Confucianism both still have an effect on cultural life in North Korea as they are traditional religions of traditional Korean culture.

=== Christianity ===
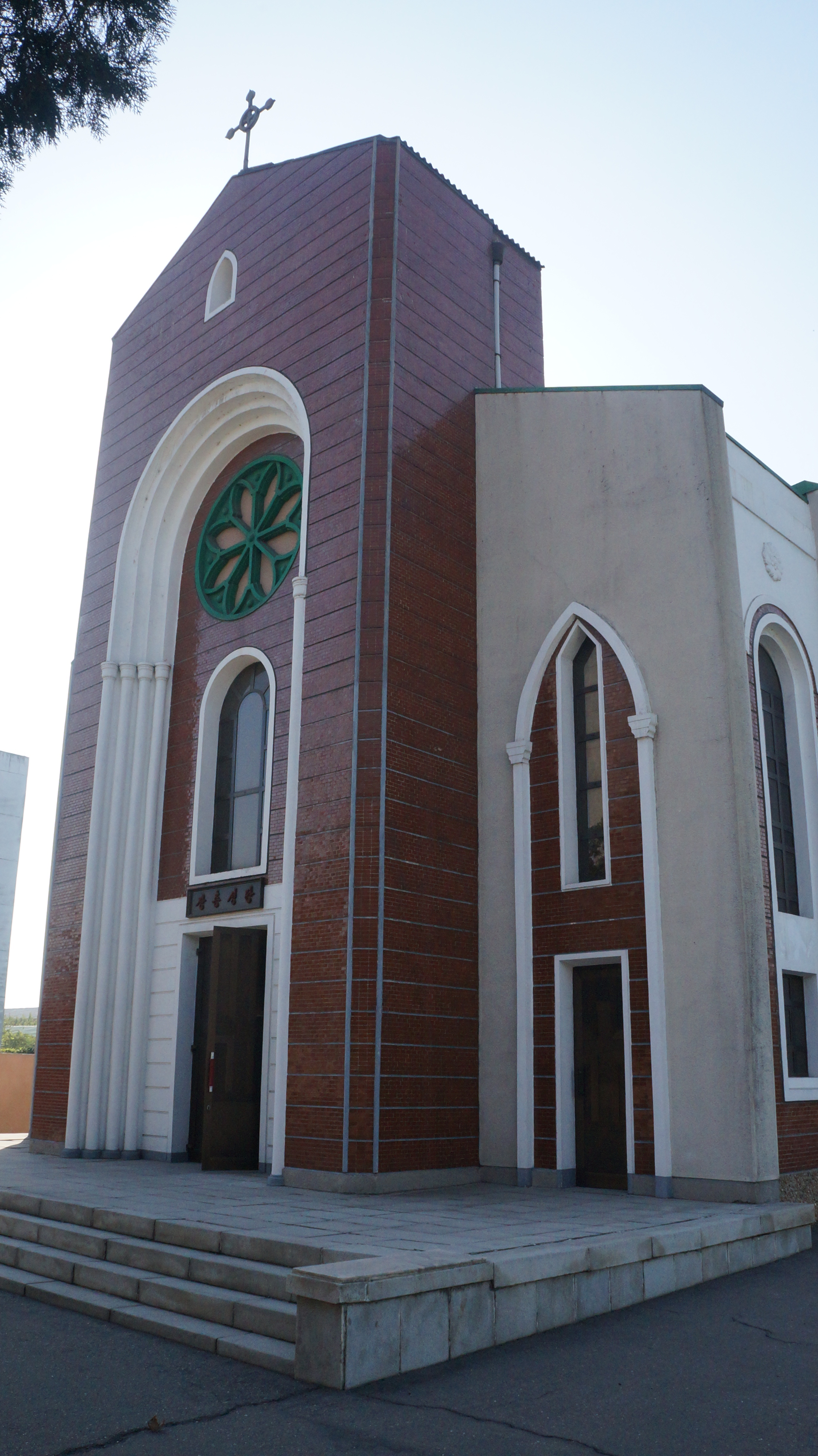
Changchung Cathedral, seat of the Roman Catholic Diocese of Pyongyang

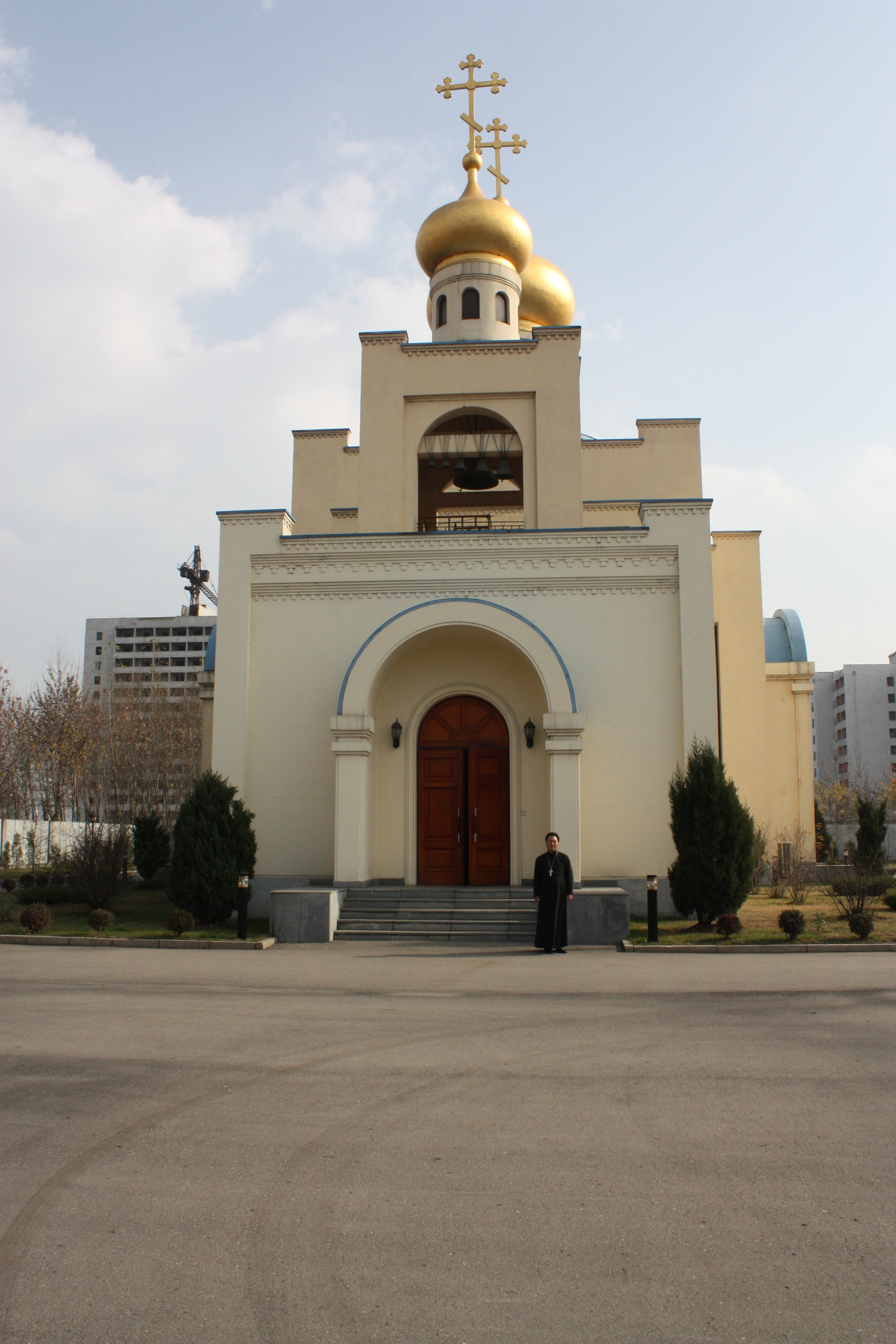
Church of the Life-Giving Trinity of the Russian Orthodox Church in Pyongyang

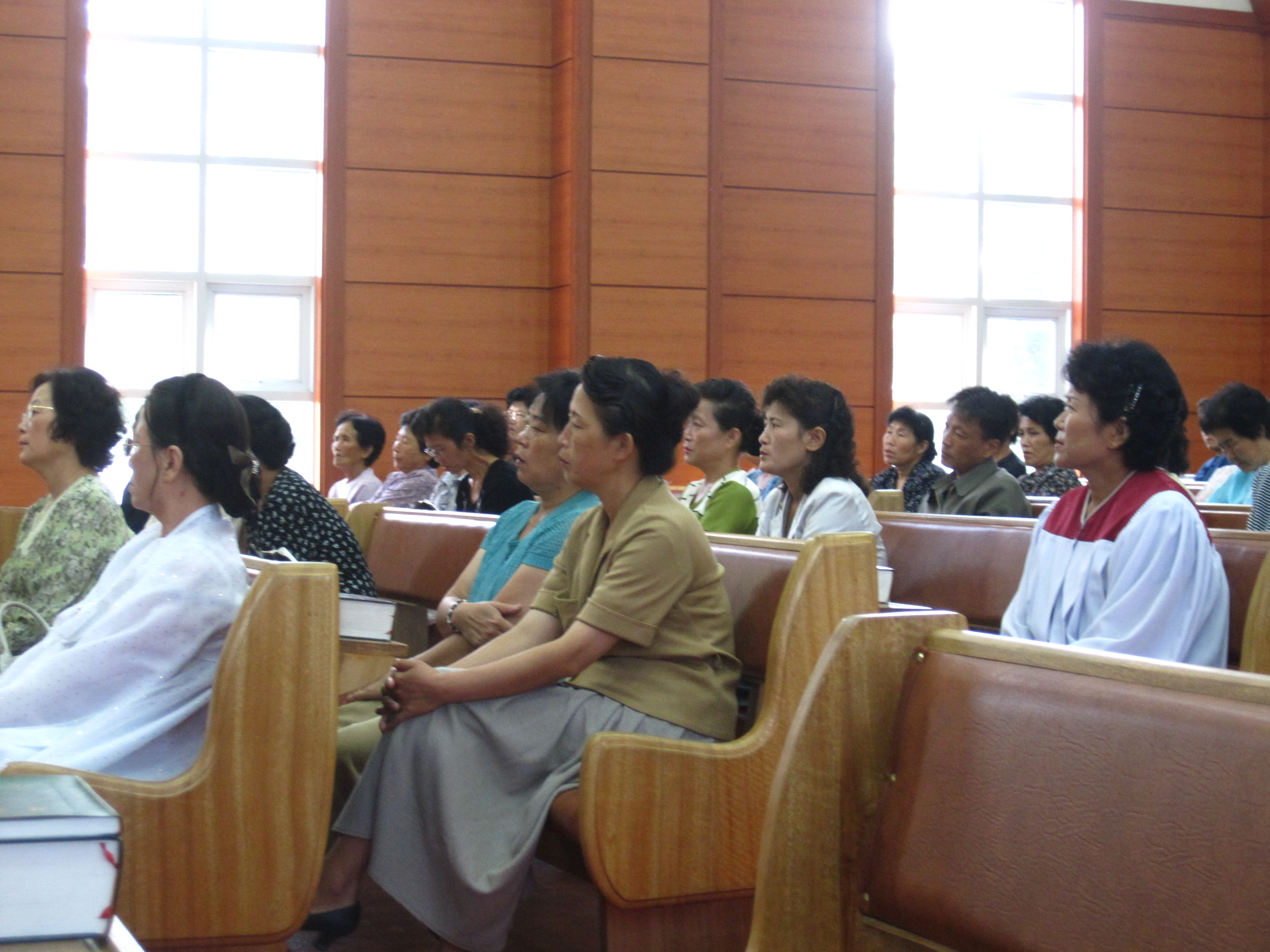
Attendees at the Protestant Bongsu Church in Pyongyang

Christianity (Korean: 그리스도교; MR: Kurisudogyo) became very popular in northern Korea from the late 18th century to the 19th century. The first Catholic missionaries arrived in 1794, a decade after the return of Yi Sung-hun, a diplomat who was the first baptised Korean in Beijing. He established a grassroots lay Catholic movement in the peninsula. However, the writings of the Jesuit missionary Matteo Ricci, who was resident at the imperial court in Beijing, had been already brought to Korea from China in the 17th century. Scholars of the Silhak ("Practical Learning"), were attracted to Catholic doctrines, and this was a key factor for the spread of the Catholic faith in the 1790s. The penetration of Western ideas and Christianity in Korea became known as Seohak ("Western Learning"). A study of 1801 found that more than half of the families that had converted to Catholicism were linked to the Silhak school. Largely because converts refused to perform Confucian ancestral rituals, the Joseon government prohibited the proselytisation of Christianity. Some Catholics were executed during the early 19th century, but the restrictive law was not strictly enforced.

Protestant missionaries entered Korea during the 1880s and, along with Catholic priests, converted a remarkable number of Koreans, this time with the tacit support of the royal government. Methodist and Presbyterian missionaries were especially successful. They established schools, universities, hospitals, and orphanages and played a significant role in the modernisation of the country. During the Japanese colonial occupation, Christians were in the front ranks of the struggle for independence. Factors contributing to the growth of Catholicism and Protestantism included the decayed state of Korean Buddhism, the support of the intellectual elite, and the encouragement of self-support and self-government among members of the Korean church, and finally the identification of Christianity with Korean nationalism.

A large number of Christians lived in the northern half of the peninsula (it was part of the so-called "Manchurian revival") where Confucian influence was not as strong as in the south. Before 1948, Pyongyang was an important Christian center: The city was known as the "Jerusalem of the East".

Many Korean Communists came from a Christian background; Kim Il-sung's mother, Kang Pan-sok, was a Presbyterian deaconess. He attended a mission school and played the organ in church. In his memoir With the Century, he wrote: "I do not think the spirit of Christianity that preaches universal peace and harmony contradicts my idea advocating an independent life for man". In 1945, with the establishment of the communist regime in the north, however, most Christians fled to South Korea to escape persecution. Christianity came to be discouraged by the North Korean government because of its association with America.

In the 1980s, North Korea produced its own translation of the Bible, which has since been used by Southern missionaries attempting to evangelize the North. By the late 1980s, it became apparent that Christians were active in the governmental elite. In those years, three new churches, two Protestant and one Catholic, were opened in Pyongyang. The number of churchgoing North Korean Christians more than doubled between the 1980s and the early 2000s, with a total of thirty ministers and 300 church officials. Proselytizing is prohibited based on the theory that it opens North Korea to impermissible foreign influence and the increase in churchgoing Christians is attributable to an active search for North Koreans who previously practiced privately or in small home congregations.

Other signs of the regime's changing attitude towards Christianity included holding the "International Seminar of Christians of the North and South for the Peace and Reunification of Korea" in Switzerland in 1988, allowing papal representatives to attend the opening of the Changchung Cathedral of Pyongyang in that same year, and sending two North Korean novice priests to study in Rome. A Protestant seminary in Pyongyang taught future leaders of the North Korean government. A new association of Roman Catholics was established in June 1988. A North Korean Protestant pastor reported at a 1989 meeting of the National Council of Churches in Washington that his country had 10,000 Protestants and 1,000 Catholics who worshiped in 500 home churches. Today, the total number of Christians in North Korea is liberally estimated to be no more than somewhere between 12,000 and 15,000. In 1992 and 1994, American evangelist Billy Graham visited North Korea. He met Kim Il-sung, giving him a Bible, and preached at Kim Il-sung University. In 2008, his son Franklin Graham visited the country. In 1991, North Korea invited the Pope to visit. In 2018, the government invited Pope Francis to visit. In late 2018, Metropolitan Hilarion Alfeyev of the Russian Orthodox Church visited North Korea, meeting with officials and leading a service at the Church of the Life-Giving Trinity in Pyongyang.

North Korean Christians are officially represented by the Korean Christian Federation, a state-controlled body responsible for contacts with churches and governments abroad. In Pyongyang there are five church buildings: the Catholic Changchung Cathedral, three Protestant churches inaugurated in 1988 in the presence of South Korean church officials, and a Russian Orthodox church consecrated in 2006.

The internationally supported Pyongyang University of Science and Technology, which opened in 2010, operates with a Christian ethos. Christian aid groups, including the American Friends Service Committee, the Mennonite Central Committee, the Eugene Bell Foundation, and World Vision, are able to operate in the country, but not allowed to proselytize.

In 2016, Christmas was celebrated in North Korea, but with the religious overtones downplayed. In 2018, the North Korean Council of Religionists sent a Christmas message to South Korea that expressed the wish that believers on both sides "go hand in hand towards peace and unification, filled with blessings by Christ the Lord".

North Korea is number one on Open Doors’ 2025 World Watch List, an annual ranking of the 50 countries where Christians face the most extreme persecution.

=== Islam ===
The Pew Research Center estimated that there were 3,000 Muslims in North Korea in 2010, an increase from the 1,000 Muslims in 1990.

Historically, Islam had little influence on the Korean Peninsula compared to Buddhism, Confucianism, and Christianity. The earliest documented Muslim contacts with Korea were associated with traders and diplomats from China and Central Asia. During the First Sino-Japanese War, the Chinese Muslim general Zuo Baogui was killed at the Battle of Pyongyang in 1894, an event that remains notable in Chinese Muslim historical memory, after that some Muslims settled in Korea.

According to James Hoare, some Muslims in North Korea are believed to be descended from the Hui.

North Korea has many Muslim-majority countries' embassies such as Palestine, Egypt, Pakistan, Syria, Indonesia and Malaysia in Pyongyang. There is a mosque in the Iranian embassy in Pyongyang called Ar-Rahman Mosque, the only mosque in the country. The mosque was built for the embassy staff, but visits by other foreigners are deemed possible, too.

== See also ==
- Ethnic minorities in North Korea
- Freedom of religion in North Korea
- Human rights in North Korea
- Misin tapa undong
- Religion in Japan
- Religion in Korea
- Religion in South Korea

== Sources ==
- Alton, David. Building Bridges: Is There Hope for North Korea?. Lion Hudson, 2013. ISBN 0745955983
- Baker, Donald L. (2008). Korean Spirituality. University of Hawaii Press. ISBN 978-0824832575.
- Choi, Joon-sik . Folk-Religion: The Customs in Korea. Ewha Womans University Press, 2006. ISBN 8973006282
- Chryssides, George D.; Geaves, Ron. The Study of Religion: An Introduction to Key Ideas and Methods. Continuum International Publishing Group, 2007. ISBN 0826464491
- Corfield, Justin. Historical Dictionary of Pyongyang. Anthem Press, 2013. ISBN 0857282344
- Grayson, James H. Korea – A Religious History. Routledge, 2002. ISBN 070071605X
- Kendall, Laurel. Shamans, Nostalgias, and the IMF: South Korean Popular Religion in Motion. University of Hawaii Press, 2010. ISBN 0824833988
- Lee, Chi-ran. Chief Director, Haedong Younghan Academy. The Emergence of National Religions in Korea.
- Lee, Jung Young (1981). Korean Shamanistic Rituals. Mouton De Gruyter. ISBN 9027933782.
- Lee, Sang Taek (1996). Religion and Social Formation in Korea: Minjung and Millenarianism. Walter de Gruyter & Co. ISBN 3110147971.
- Park, Young. Korea and the Imperialists: In Search of a National Identity. Author House, 2009. ISBN 1438931409
- Min, Pyong Gap. Development of Protestantism in South Korea: Positive and Negative Elements. On: Asian American Theological Forum (AATF) 2014, VOL. 1 NO. 3, ISSN 2374-8133
- Sorensen, Clark W. University of Washington. The Political Message of Folklore in South Korea's Student Demonstrations of the Eighties: An Approach to the Analysis of Political Theater. Paper presented at the conference "Fifty Years of Korean Independence", sponsored by the Korean Political Science Association, Seoul, Korea, July 1995.
- Tudor, Daniel. Korea: The Impossible Country. Tuttle Publishing, 2012. ISBN 0804842523
- Walter, Mariko N.; Eva J. Neumann Fridman. Shamanism: An Encyclopedia of World Beliefs, Practices, and Culture. ABC-CLIO, 2004. ISBN 1576076458
