= Military chaplain =

Ministers to military personnel

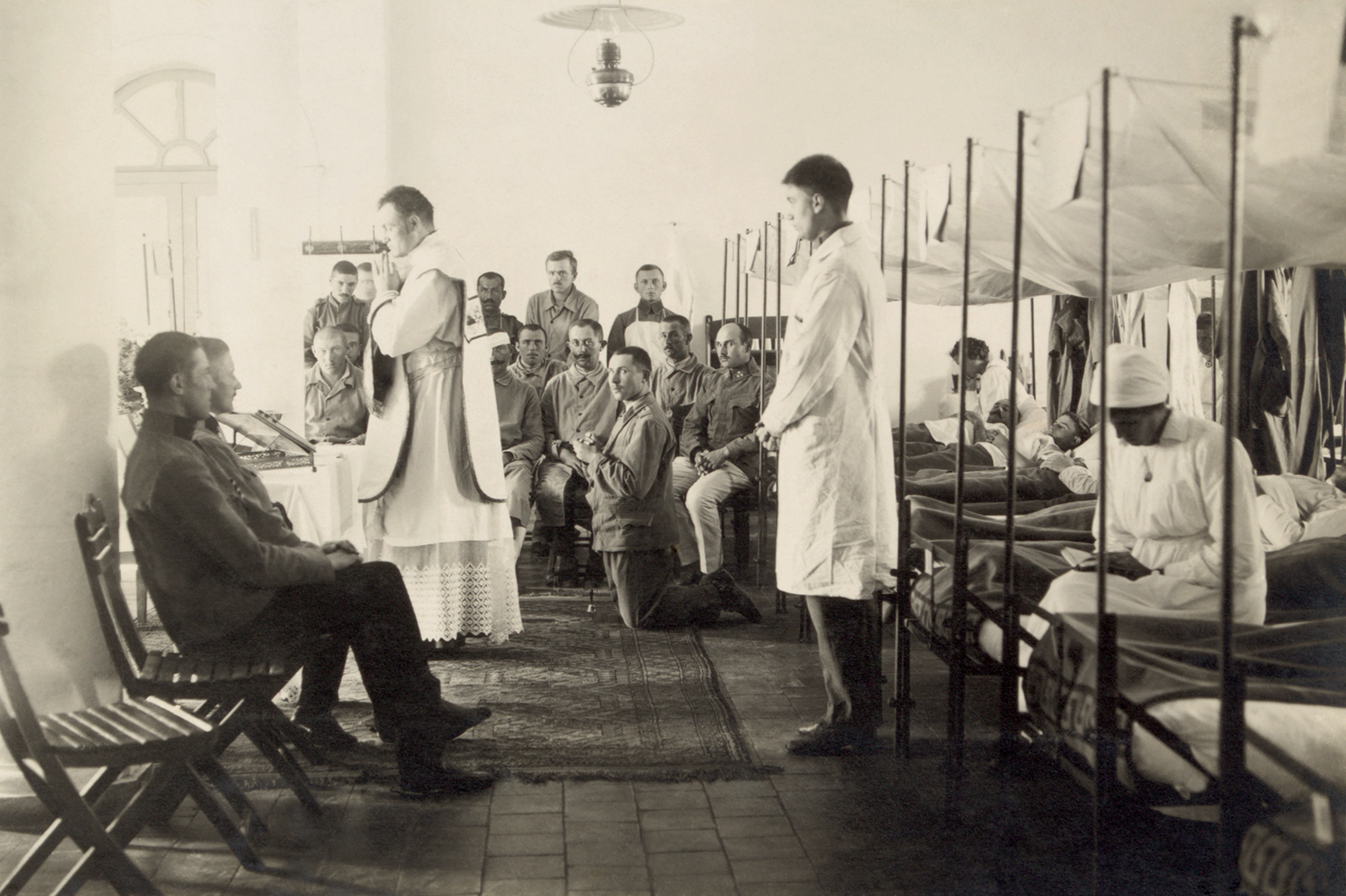
- A Catholic chaplain celebrating mass in an Austrian military hospital in 1916

Occupation
- Names: Chaplain, Rabbi, Purohit, Imam, Priest, Padre (Spanish), Cappellano Militare (Italian), MSWO
- Occupation type: Profession
- Activity sectors: Religion, morale, religious support

Description
- Competencies: Counseling
- Fields of employment: Military
- Related jobs: Chaplain assistant

A military chaplain ministers to military personnel and, in most cases, their families and civilians working for the military. In some cases, they will also work with local civilians within a military area of operations.

Although the term chaplain originally had Christian roots, it is generally used today in military organizations to describe all professionals specially trained to serve any spiritual need, regardless of religious, world philosophy or status. In addition to offering pastoral care to individuals and supporting their religious rights and needs, military chaplains may also advise their chain of command on issues of religion, ethics, morale, and morals as affected by religion, world philosophy or status. They may also liaise with local religious leaders in an effort to understand the role of religion as a factor both in hostility and war and in reconciliation and peace.

Military chaplains normally represent a specific religion or faith group but work with military personnel of all faiths. Some countries, like Australia, Belgium, Canada, the Netherlands, Norway and the United Kingdom also employ humanist or non-faith-based chaplains who offer a non-religious approach to chaplain support. From 1918 to 1942, political commissars in the Soviet Red Army monitored and shaped the beliefs, loyalties, and enthusiasms of Soviet soldiers and officers in a context of official state atheism.

== Nomination, selection, and commissioning ==
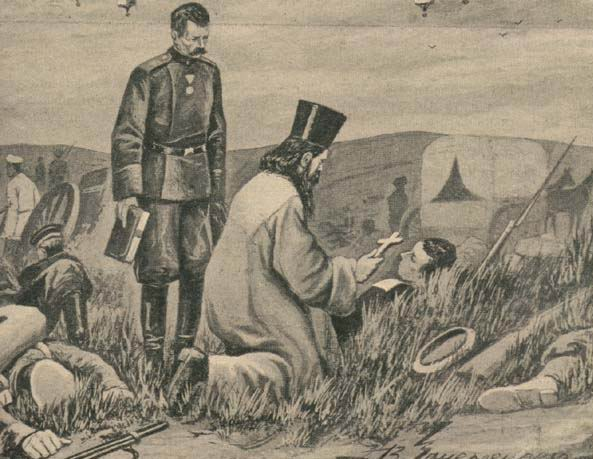
An Orthodox priest administers Holy Communion to a wounded Russian soldier during the Russo-Japanese War of 1904–1905

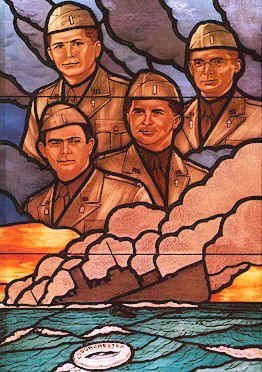
Stained glass window, Pentagon, honoring the Four Chaplains, SS Dorchester, 1943

In the United Kingdom, the Ministry of Defence employs chaplains, but their authority comes from their sending church or endorsing authorities. At the present time there are no non-religious chaplains. Royal Navy chaplains undertake a 16-week bespoke induction and training course, including a short course at Britannia Royal Naval College, and specialist fleet time at sea alongside a more experienced chaplain. Naval chaplains called to service with the Royal Marines undertake a commando course at Commando Training Centre Royal Marines, Lympstone and if successful serve with a front-line Royal Marines unit. British Army chaplains undertake seven-weeks training at The Armed Forces Chaplaincy Centre Amport House and the Royal Military Academy Sandhurst. Royal Air Force chaplains must complete 12 weeks Specialist Entrant course at the RAF College Cranwell followed by a Chaplains' Induction Course at Armed Forces Chaplaincy Centre Amport House of a further 2 weeks. Amport House was sold by the MOD in 2020.

In the United States, the term, nomination, is not generally applied to the process of becoming a military chaplain. Individuals volunteer, and if they are accepted, they are commissioned as military staff officers in the Chaplain Corps. Members of the clergy who meet the qualifications for service as an officer in the military are free to apply for service with any of the three United States Chaplain Corps: the Army, Navy, and Air Force each has a Chaplain Corps, with Navy chaplains also assigned to serve with Marine Corps units, Coast Guard units, and the Merchant Marine Academy. Some clergy, like rabbis, can apply without permission from any individual or organization within their faith group; others, in faith groups that have a hierarchy established to make decisions on the postings or positions of their members, must be granted permission from the appropriate official, such as the appropriate Bishop. As the application process proceeds, and the military determines whether the applicant will meet standards in areas such as health, physical fitness, age, education, citizenship, past criminal history, and suitability for service, which includes supporting the free exercise of religion for men and women of all faiths, an endorsement from an endorsing agency that is recognized by the Department of Defense, representing one or more faith groups in the United States, will be required, in part to ensure that the separation of church and state is honored. Neither the government as a whole nor the military in particular will be put into the position of determining whether an individual is a bona fide priest, minister, rabbi, imam, etc. (The requirement for such an endorsement has been in force since 1901, and today many of the various religious endorsing agencies work together under such non-governmental voluntary umbrella groups as the National Conference on Ministry to the Armed Forces.) Although ordination is usually required for chaplain service, some "equivalent" status is accepted for individuals from religious groups which do not have ordination, such as the Church of Christ. Additionally, in cases where an endorsing agency is not yet established for an individual's religion, it is possible for him or her to be endorsed by the endorsing agency of another group, a process which was followed for the first Muslim chaplains in the military. In any event, this endorsement is recognized as necessary, but not sufficient for acceptance as a chaplain: in other words, the military will not accept an individual for service as a chaplain, nor allow him or her to continue to serve, without such an endorsement remaining in force; however, the decision as to whether to accept that individual remains with the military service, and the individual can be rejected for a number of reasons, including the needs of the military, even with the endorsement of an endorsing agency.

== Non-combatant status ==
The Geneva Conventions are silent on whether chaplains may bear arms. However, the Conventions do state (Protocol I, 8 June 1977, Art 43.2) that chaplains are non-combatants: they do not have the right to participate directly in hostilities.

It is generally assumed that during World War II, chaplains were unarmed. Crosby describes an incident where a US chaplain became a trained tank gunner and was removed from the military for this "entirely illegal, not to mention imprudent" action. At least some British chaplains serving in the Far East, however, were armed: George MacDonald Fraser recalls "the tall figure of the battalion chaplain, swinging along good style with his .38 on his hip" immediately behind the lead platoon during a battalion attack. Fraser asks, "if the padre shot [an enemy], what would the harvest be ... apart from three ringing cheers from the whole battalion?" The Reverend Leslie Hardman, the British Second Army's senior Jewish chaplain, who became well known for his work amongst the liberated prisoners after the capture of Bergen-Belsen concentration camp, was another who insisted on being armed while on active service.

In recent years, both the UK and US have required chaplains, but not medical personnel, to be unarmed in combat, although the US does not prohibit chaplains from earning marksmanship awards or participating in marksmanship competitions. Other nations, notably Norway, Denmark and Sweden, and also Australia, make it an issue of individual conscience. There are anecdotal accounts that even US and UK chaplains have at least occasionally unofficially borne weapons: Chaplain (then Captain) James D. Johnson, of the 9th Infantry Division, Mobile Riverine Force in Vietnam describes (Combat Chaplain: A Thirty-Year Vietnam Battle) carrying the M-16 rifle while embedded with a combat patrol. Since 1909 US chaplains on operations have been accompanied by an armed chaplain assistant. However, perhaps on this occasion it was felt that an unarmed uniformed man would draw unwelcome attention.

Captured chaplains are not considered prisoners of war and must be returned to their home nation unless retained to minister to prisoners of war.

Inevitably, serving chaplains have died in action. The US Army and Marines lost 100 chaplains killed in action during World War II: the third highest casualty rate behind the infantry and the Army Air Forces. Many have been decorated for bravery in action (five have been awarded Britain's highest award for gallantry, the Victoria Cross, and nine have received the Medal of Honor). The Chaplain's Medal for Heroism is a special US military decoration given to military chaplains who have been killed in the line of duty, although it has to date only been awarded to the famous Four Chaplains, all of whom died in the Dorchester sinking in 1943 after giving up their lifejackets to others.

In 2006, training materials obtained by US intelligence showed that insurgent snipers fighting in Iraq were urged to single out and attack engineers, medics, and chaplains on the theory that those casualties would demoralize entire enemy units. Among the training materials, there included an insurgent sniper training manual that was posted on the Internet. Among its tips for shooting US troops, there read: "Killing doctors and chaplains is suggested as a means of psychological warfare."

== Chief of chaplains/chaplain general ==
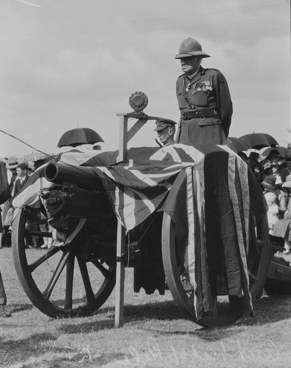
Anglican Archbishop Riley addressing a crowd as 'Chaplain-General to the AIF'

Military chaplains are often supervised by a chaplain general or chief of chaplains, on the staff of the leader of the nation's military forces. In some countries, like Israel, Canada, and South Africa, one chief of chaplains/chaplain general serves in that position for all chaplains of all religions, in all branches of the military. In many other countries, such as France, there is a separate chaplain general/chief of chaplains for each faith group represented by chaplains. In other countries, like the United States and United Kingdom, there is one chaplain general/chief of chaplains for each branch of the military. So, for example, in the United States, there is an Army, Navy, and Air Force chief of chaplains. They meet on as representatives to the Armed Forces Chaplains Board, to discuss issues that cross service lines, but each reports as a staff officer of his or her service, to the Chief of Staff of the Army or Air Force, or the Chief of Naval Operations of the Navy. (In the United States, Navy chaplains serve Navy, Marine Corps and Coast Guard personnel. Navy chaplains also assigned to the Merchant Marine Academy, for Merchant Marine personnel.)

== International organization ==
The International Military Chiefs of Chaplains Conference grew out of a conference NATO chiefs of chaplains organized by the United States European Command (USEUCOM) in 1990. It welcomes any chief of chaplains (or chaplain general, an equivalent term used by many nations).

== Religions and faith group organizations ==
=== Christianity ===
==== Catholic Church ====
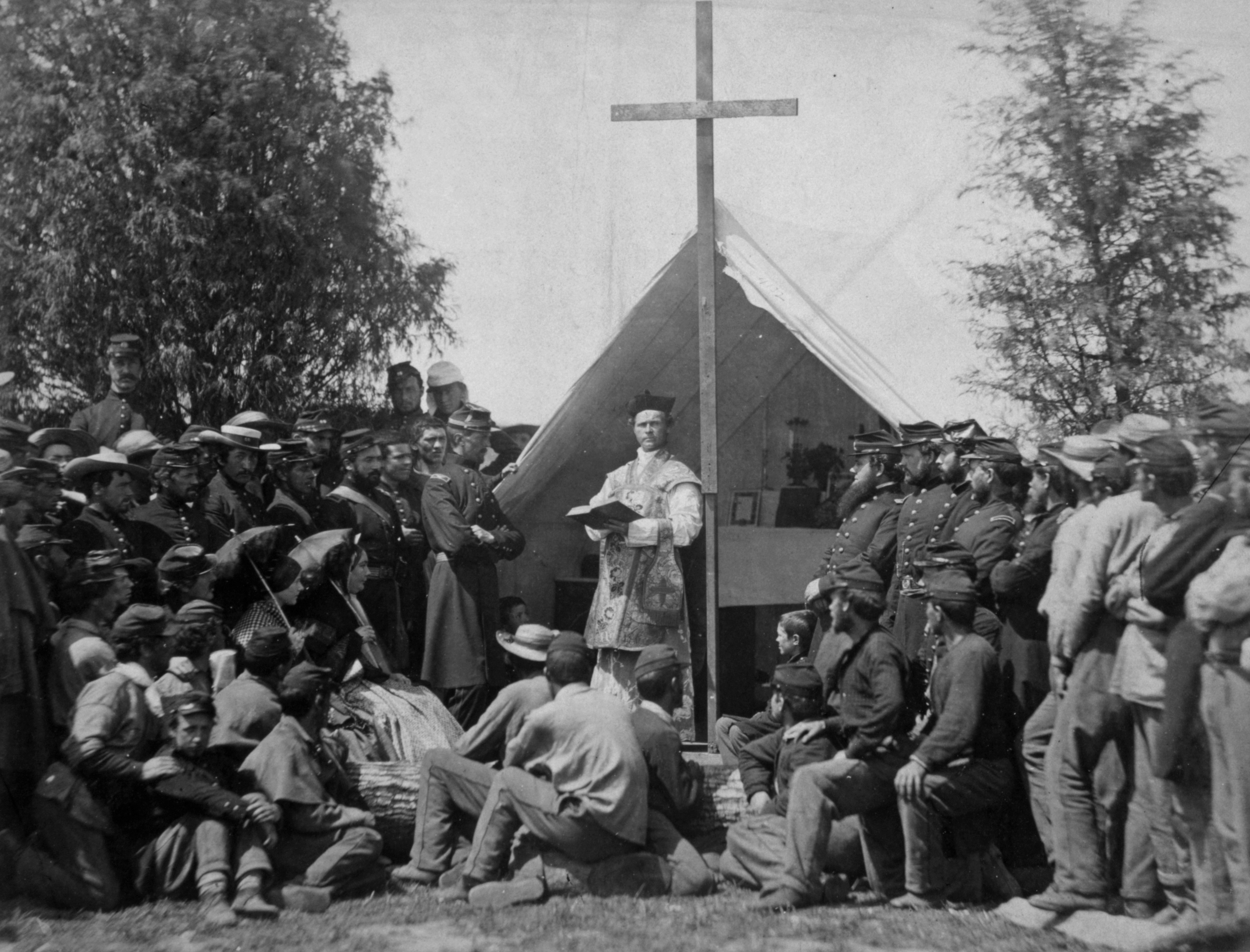
Fr. Thomas Mooney, a Catholic chaplain of the 69th Infantry Regiment of the New York State Militia, at a mass with fellow soldiers at Fort Corcoran, Arlington Heights, Virginia, 1861

Catholic chaplains are generally organized into military ordinariates, such as the Archdiocese for the Military Services, USA. Potential Roman Catholic chaplains must seek permission from their diocesan bishop or religious superior to serve as a military chaplain. While serving as a chaplain, the priest or deacon remains incardinated in his home diocese, but is temporarily under the direction of the prelate of the ordinariate for the duration of his service.

==== Protestant denominations ====
Each of the various Protestant Christian denominations may set its own requirements for certification as a minister.

=== Judaism ===
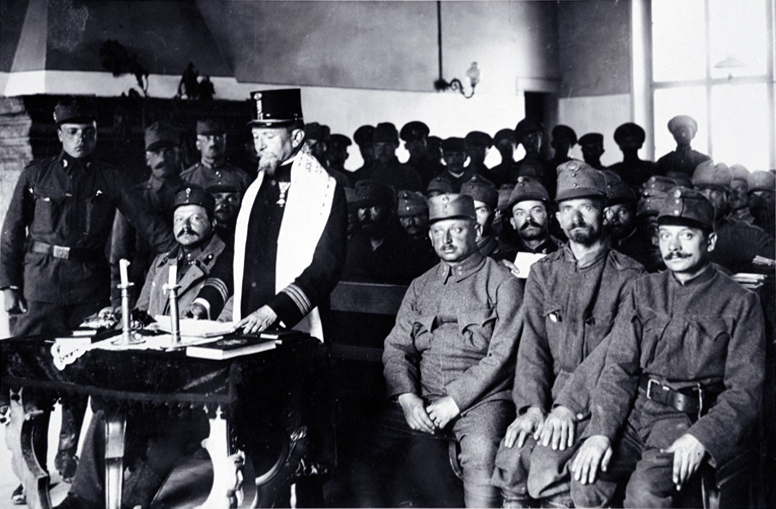
Austrian Jewish military service during WWI (1914–18).

Besides the Military Rabbinate of Israel, today, military rabbis serve throughout several countries of the world, most notably in the US military forces, and various European armies. Since the rise of the Christian religion in Europe and worldwide, as a matter of course Christians fought against Christians over and over again. During World War I, for the first time a substantial number of Jews served on all sides of the war, and so did military rabbis. As a result of 18th and 19th centuries` emancipation, "military field rabbis" served on all fronts and in all combating nations.

== Badges and insignia ==
Badges and insignia vary widely across nations and services; though generally include some form of symbol specific to the individual chaplain's religion.

In addition to badges and insignias for individual chaplains, certain nations, including the United States, fly a Church or Worship Pennant during the time a chaplain leads a religious worship service, especially on ships at sea. On United States Navy ships it is the only pennant that flies above the United States flag.

== Military chaplains by country ==
=== Argentina ===
Roman Catholic military chaplains served in the Argentine armed forces since the early nineteenth century, and wore officers´ uniforms and ranks. However, the use of these was discontinued in the 1970s in the Army and the Air Force, and in the 2000s in the Navy, due to allegations of some chaplains supposedly abusing their military position and thus discouraging their subordinates to approach them when in need. Nevertheless, chaplains continue to wear combat uniform (but no rank insignia) when accompanying the troops in field operations or exercises, and are still considered as a part of the officers corps; some chaplains in specific positions (such as the military bishop or the chief chaplain of each individual armed service) are given some ceremonial privileges, but no rank. No specific provisions exist for the spiritual support to non-Catholics, mostly due to their -still- low numbers, but it remains an open issue.

=== Armenia ===
External videos
- Chaplaincy Program in the Armenian Army (Preparations For the Parade)

The Armenian Army has a sponsored chaplaincy program which is jointly funded by the Ministry of Defence of Armenia and the Armenian Apostolic Church. More than 50 clergymen serve as chaplains in the Armed Forces of Armenia. They often organize religious programs and offer opportunities for prayer, especially before each military exercise conducted by the armed forces. The clergy program was created in 1997 on the initiative of Karekin I and the directive of Minister of Defense Vazgen Sargsyan. A combined clergy company will usually take part in the quinquennial Independence Day Parade on Republic Square. All military chaplains are commissioned army officers.

=== Australia ===
==== Army and Air Force ====
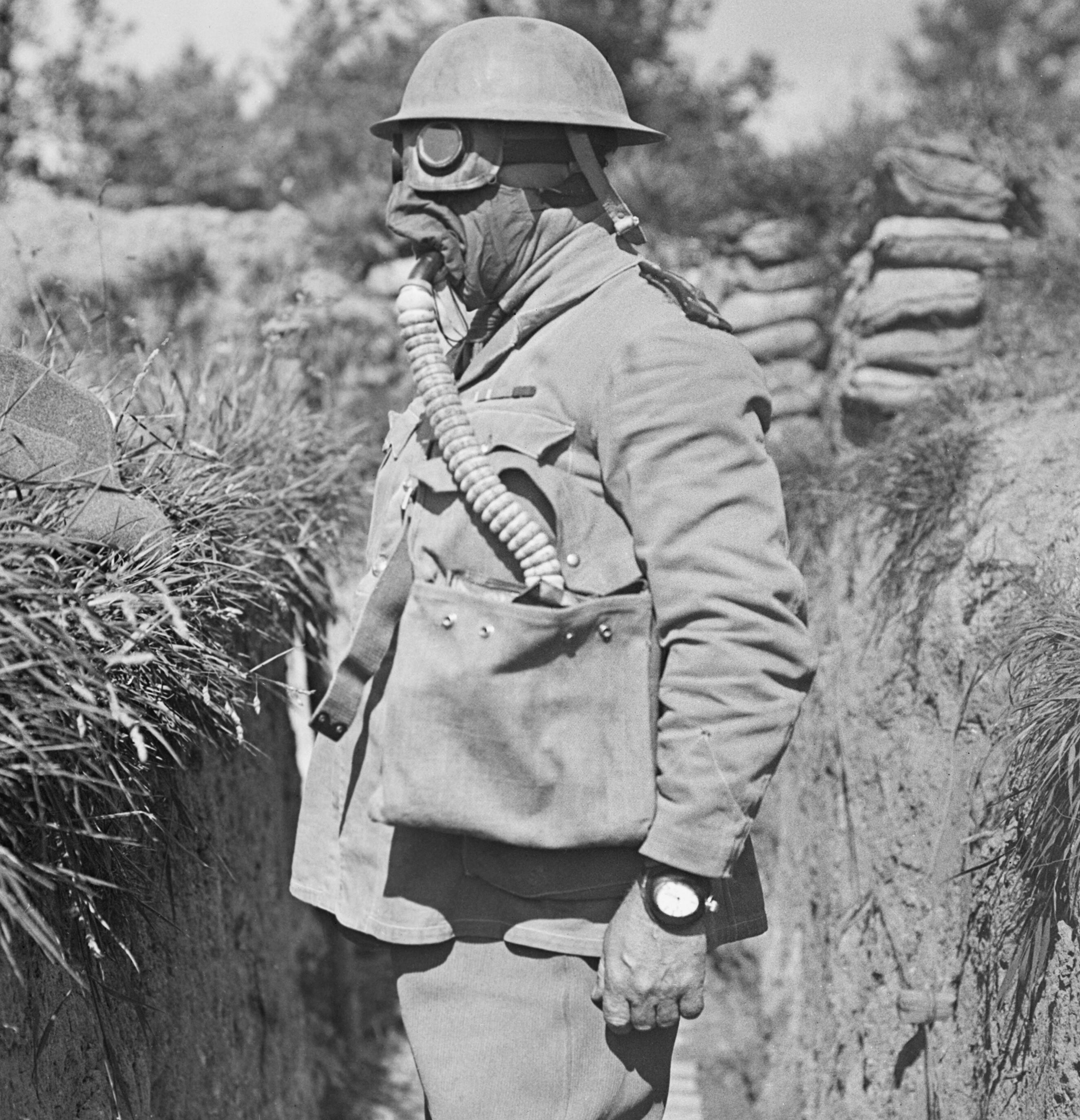
An Australian chaplain wearing the "Large Box Respirator" also known as the "Respiratory Tower" during the First World War, Bois Grenier Sector on 5 June 1916.

Chaplains in the Australian Defence Force (ADF) have almost the same status as chaplains in the British armed services. Chaplains in the Australian Army and Royal Australian Air Force (RAAF) are commissioned officers and wear the uniform of officers of their particular branch of the services as well as the rank to which they are qualified. Chaplains in the Australian Army and the Royal Australian Air Force begin their commission as a Captain (Army) or Flight Lieutenant (RAAF) respectively. There are five levels or "divisions" for the seniority of chaplains in the Australian Army and Air Force with each division corresponding to a worn rank. The highest "division" is Division 5 who are "principal chaplains," of which there are three per service representing the three major Christian denominations: Catholic, Anglican and Protestant. The principal chaplains of the Army wear the rank of brigadier and in the RAAF, air commodore. Australian Army chaplains, whatever their rank, are mostly referred to as "Padre" by officers and soldiers alike. The title is also widely used in the RAAF for their chaplains.

==== Navy ====
From July 2020, Maritime Spiritual Wellbeing Officers (MSWOs) were introduced to the Navy Chaplaincy Branch, designed to give Navy people and their families with professional, non-religious pastoral care and spiritual support.

Like chaplains in the Australian Army and RAAF, Royal Australian Navy (RAN) chaplains and MSWOs are commissioned officers and wear the uniform of an RAN officer, but like the British Royal Navy (RN) do not wear rank rank. For reasons of protocol, ceremonial occasions and for saluting purposes, they are normally grouped with Commanders (O-5). The more senior Division 4 Senior Chaplains are grouped with Captains (O-6) and Division 5 Principal Chaplains are grouped with Commodores (O-7), but their rank slide remains the same. Principal Chaplains and MSWOs, however, have gold braid on the peak of their white service cap.

The title "Padre" for chaplains is less common and not officially encouraged in the Royal Australian Navy, although it is known to be used by some sailors and Navy chaplains in preference to the more formal title of "chaplain" or form of address towards an officer such as "sir." Like British Royal Navy chaplains, Royal Australian Navy chaplains wear a slightly different peaked cap to other Navy officers which apparently was designed by Winston Churchill.

==== Heads of denominations ====
In the Australian Defence Force (ADF), the heads of military chaplaincy for those Christian denominations and of the Jewish faith that have an official association with the ADF, are also members of the ADF's "Religious Advisory Committee" (RAC). With respect to the Catholic and Anglican churches, their Bishops are members of RAC and they and the other members of RAC have the status of a two star General (US) or Major General (Australian Army), or Rear Admiral (RAN) or Air Vice-Marshal (RAAF).

The Anglican and Roman Catholic strands of Australian Defence Force Chaplaincy have websites that explain their church's mission within the Australian Defence Force. While the Protestant strand does not have a website, one of their chaplains has a representative blog site.

=== Belgium ===
Belgium has Catholic, Jewish, Protestant and Humanist chaplains.

=== Brazil ===
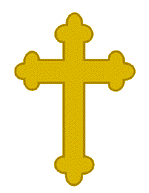
Catholic military chaplain badge of the Brazilian army

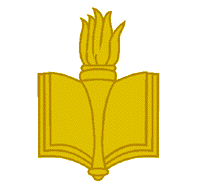
Protestant military chaplain badge of the Brazilian army

The Brazilian constitution in its article, 5-VII, guarantees religious assistance in civil or military institutions of collective detention, such as prison, hospital or any other institution. The Brazilian government hires a chaplain for every two thousand soldiers of a religion.

Brazilian law is not complied with, as there are only Catholic and Protestant chaplains, ignoring the Kardecist Spiritism religious group that has the minimum number required by law to have a chaplain. The inclusion of Afro-Brazilian religions was discussed in the judiciary, distinguished black militants asking for military chaplains in the Brazilian Armed Forces.

Brazil has a gigantic religious variety with Catholics, Protestants, Muslims, Jews, Kardecist Spiritism, afro-Brazilian religions, Brazilian animist religions, Brazilian Syncretic Religions, but in the Brazilian Armed Forces only Catholics and Protestants have chaplains. Brazil adopted professional military chaplains only in World War II, during which 25 Catholic priests and 2 Protestant reverends gave religious assistance to 45,000 Brazilian soldiers in the Italian campaign.

During the Paraguayan War, a German reverend enlisted as a soldier to provide religious assistance to Protestant soldiers, at the time 90% of Brazilians were Catholic.

=== Canada ===
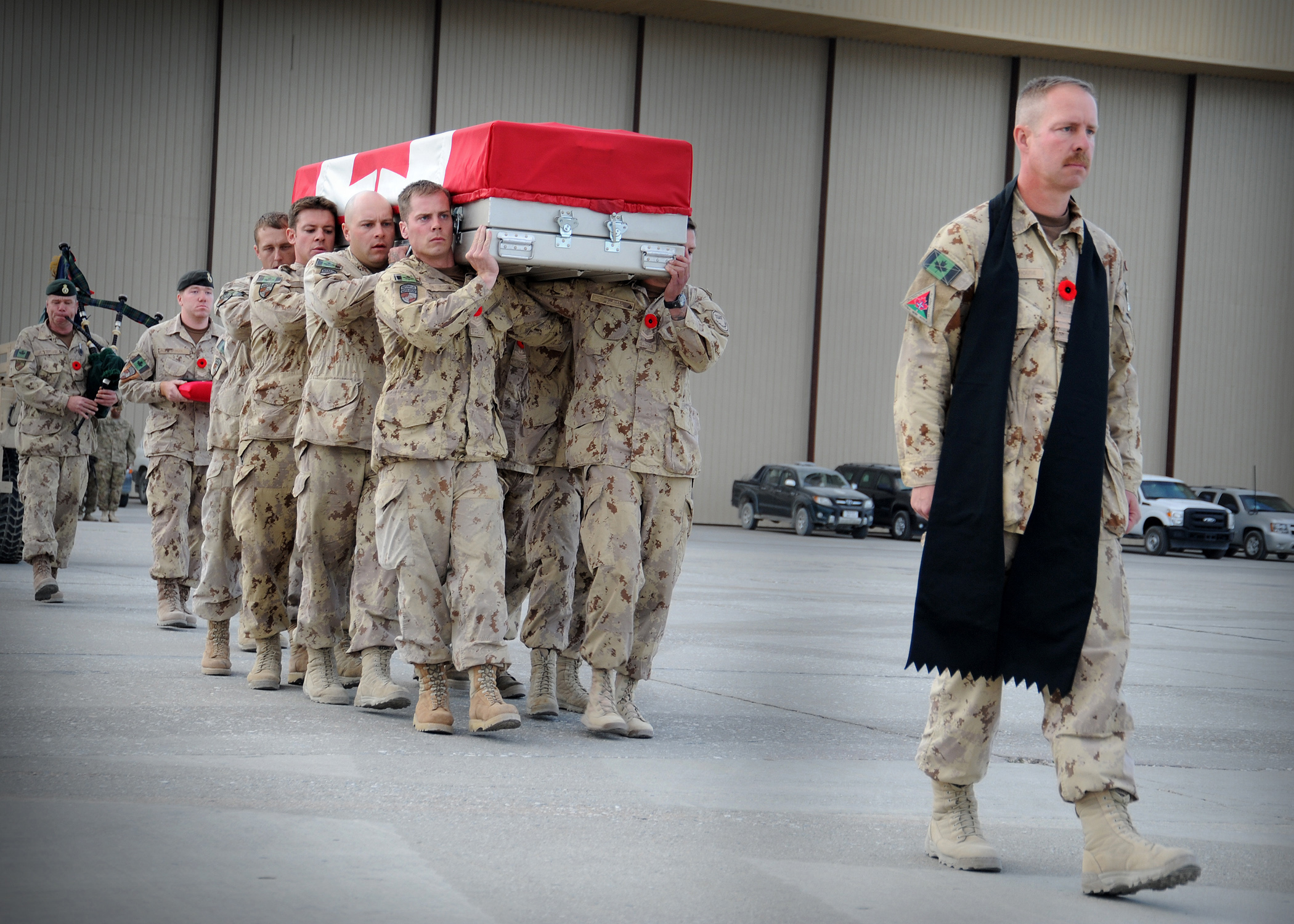
A cadre of Canadian service members, led by a chaplain, carry the transfer case

The Canadian Armed Forces Chaplaincy has approximately 192 Regular Force chaplains and 145 Reserve Force chaplains representing the Protestant, Roman Catholic, Muslim and Jewish faiths. The mission of this Branch is to "support and enhance the effectiveness of the CF as a whole – its leadership, the individual men and women who serve and their families – through the provision of comprehensive religious and spiritual support, advice, and care." The vision of the Chaplaincy is to "be an operationally relevant Chaplaincy that supports and cares for all CF personnel and their families, wherever they live and serve, empowering them spiritually and morally to meet the demands of military service."

Their role is to:

- Foster the religious, spiritual and moral well-being of members and their families
- Offer a ministry of presence in a multitude of environments (at home and abroad)
- Participate in the life of the worshipping community
- Officiate at special functions
- Advise the Commanding Officer regarding the spiritual and ethical well-being and morale of their unit
- Liaise with civilian religious faith groups
- Collaborate with other care providers
- Provide directed care after critical incidents

When offering prayers during parades and ceremonies, it is customary that the order to remove headdress be given to those on parade. In November 2004, Court Martial Appeal Court of Canada ruled that this order was "not lawful" since it unjustifiably required all attendees to show participation in a prayer that may not believe. Following this ruling, non-believers are now permitted to retain their headdress just like Jews and Sikhs do in accordance with their faith.

=== Denmark ===
Known in Danish as Feltpræsten (English: field priest), there are 95 Church of Denmark military chaplains serving in the Danish armed forces, ministering to all personnel regardless of their particular faith or lack of faith.

Chaplains are uniformed, and the chaplaincy service has a system of internal grades separate from the usual ranking system, allowing each chaplain to be regarded as equal in rank to the person he is addressing.

In most countries non-combatant personnel carry no weapons, but Danish chaplains are permitted to carry a sidearm for purposes of self-defence.

Grade	Navy	Army	Air Force
Dean			
Chaplain			
Conscript Chaplain			

=== Finland ===
Rank insignia for military chaplains of the Finnish Army. Left: Orthodox chaplain; right: Lutheran chaplain.

Finland has had Lutheran and Orthodox chaplains in the Finnish Defence Forces since 1922, headed by a Lutheran Field Bishop since 1941. Jewish chaplain services were also available during the Second World War.

==== History ====
Finnish units of the Swedish military (as Finland was a part of Sweden until 1809) have had Lutheran clergy attached to them since the 16th century.

In independent Finland, the military clergy were founded shortly after the foundation of the Finnish Defence Forces in 1918, on 31 March 1918, initially as Lutheran only. However, on 1922 an office for an Orthodox chaplain was also opened.

Coat of arms of the Field Bishop of the Finnish Army.

The title of Field Bishop was first granted by the President of Finland Risto Ryti to senior chaplain Johannes Björklund, on 11 July 1941, and the Lutheran Church amended its order of assembly on 3 October 1941, to include the Field Bishop. The actual rank of a Field Bishop (originally equivalent to Major General, nowadays Brigadier General after the rank was introduced) was founded in January 1943, and the office of the chaplain general (previously sotarovasti) was renamed respectively and elevated to a general officer rank. The Field Bishop is a member of the Episcopal Conference of the Evangelical Lutheran Church of Finland as well as the General Synod, but from a doctrinal viewpoint, not a bishop of the Evangelical Lutheran Church of Finland.

During the Second World War, 880 Lutheran priests served in the Finnish Defence Forces as chaplains, 63% of the whole clergy of the Evangelical Lutheran Church of Finland. A total of 35 chaplains were killed in action, 12 during the Winter War and 23 during the Continuation War. Throughout the wars, 12-16 Orthodox chaplains were also in service at a time. During the Second World War, Finland was unique among German allied Axis powers (Note: Finland was allied with Germany only during the Continuation War of 1941–1944.) in including Jewish soldiers in its military as well as having field chaplaincy services available for them. Jewish field chaplaincy services were established ad hoc by Isak Smolar with the help of Helsinki Synagogue, as there were no permanent office for a Jewish chaplain in the Finnish military.

==== Currently ====
As a requirement, the career Finnish military chaplains must be ordinated clergy of the Lutheran or Orthodox churches of Finland, thus also possessing the degree of Master of Theology in their respective denominations, as well as having served their mandatory military service. Senior chaplains must be eligible for the position of a rector (kirkkoherra), and the Field Bishop must possess the advanced pastoral qualification of the Evangelical Lutheran Church of Finland. Conscript chaplains (and reservists with training as a conscript chaplain) must be university students of Lutheran or Orthodox theology and members of their respective churches. Conscript deacons must be students in either social services or community education, with ecclesiastical eligibility. Conscripts from other denominations may also serve as conscript chaplains or deacons, provided they fulfill the same requirements of university studies but within their denomination.

In current peacetime organisation, there are 26 members of the Lutheran military clergy, the Field Bishop and 25 military chaplains. Currently no permanent duty Orthodox chaplains are in service, but ordinary Orthodox clergy serve these duties part-time; 5 priests in total, one in the Defence Command and four in each of the areas of the four former military provinces.

In regard to ecclesiastical duty, the Lutheran chaplains are subordinated to the Field Bishop, but juridically also to the Lutheran bishopric in whose area their permanent office posting is. On contrary, Orthodox chaplains are ecclesiastically only subordinated to the Orthodox bishopric in whose area their permanent office posting is. In other duties, the chaplains are subordinated to the standard military command structure. The chaplains, regardless of denomination, may choose whether to carry arms or not; Lutheran chaplains are allowed to use arms in collective defence, but Orthodox chaplains are not allowed to use lethal force.

The ranks of the military clergy are divided as follows:

NATO code	OF-6	OF-4	OF-2
Collar
Shoulder
Rank	Field Bishop	Senior Chaplain	Chaplain
Equivalent	Brigadier General	Lieutenant Colonel	Captain

Conscript chaplains and deacons may possess either the rank of a conscript NCO or enlisted men. To distinguish them from other conscripts, they carry specific arm insignia:

Conscript Chaplain/Deacon

=== France ===
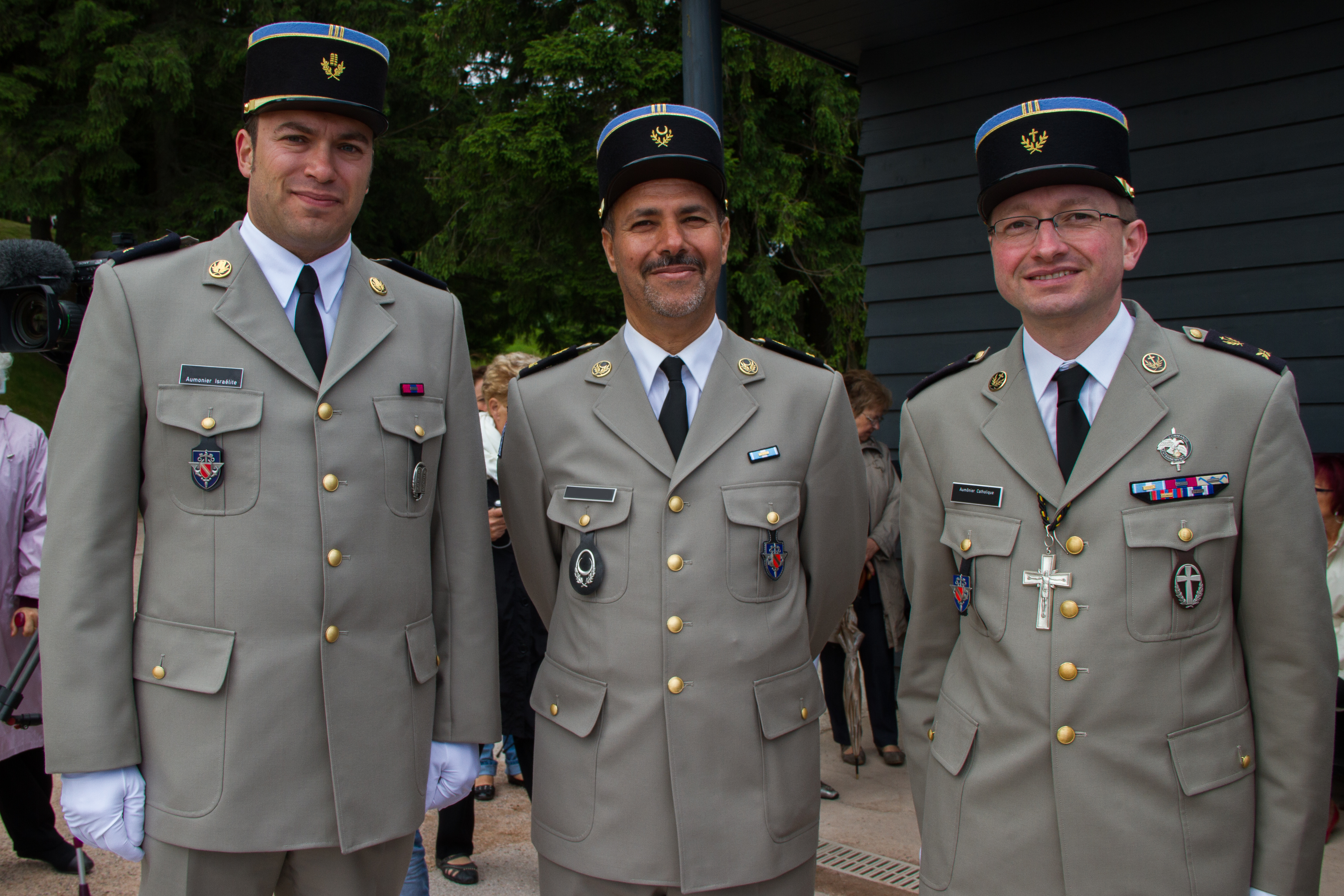
French military chaplains Jewish, Muslim and Catholic, Place de Strasbourg 2013

During the Middle Ages, the cloak of Saint Martin of Tours, (cappa Sancti Martini), one of the most sacred relics of the Frankish kings, would be carried everywhere the king went, even into battle, as a holy relic upon which oaths were sworn. The clergyman who served as custodian for the cloak in its reliquary was called a capellānus, and, by extension, all clergymen who officiated in reliquaries, sanctuaries, or chapels were eventually called cappellāni. This eventually gave chapelain in Old French and was borrowed into English.

Saint Louis was the king who gave legal status to the military chaplains, since chaplains serving under their lord in the Crusades were the first to be militarized. In 1531, during the Battle of Kappel, the Swiss reformist Huldrych Zwingli became the very first Protestant military chaplain to be killed on the battlefield.

The modern French Aumônerie militaire (military chaplaincy) was created and instituted by an 8 July 1880 Act of Parliament, which sets forth how the chaplaincy functions with regard to the Catholic, Protestant, and Jewish faiths. The Secularism Act (1905), which establishes a strict separation of church and state in the French government, does not however apply to the military. The defense minister appoints three command-level military chaplains—one per faith—in charge of all chaplains. The chaplains, serving in the army, are assigned by one of these three military chaplains. The first Muslim chaplain-general, Abdelkader Arbi, was commissioned in 2006.

French military chaplains wear a uniform since World War II, but have no rank or rank insignia. The modern military chaplaincy is rooted in that war, where military chaplains were incorporated in almost every Free French Forces fighting unit and made up of personnel from England, France, or any of its imperial domains. After the war, military chaplains were sent to occupation zones in Germany and Austria.

In the 1950s, military chaplains were sent in the French Union's territories, including Indochina and Algeria. In 1954, pastor Tissot was one of the last paratrooper volunteers to jump over the besieged Dien Bien Phu fortified camp in northern Vietnam. On 7 May, he was made prisoner of the Viet Minh and sent to a re-education camp, deep in the jungle.

Since 1984, French military chaplains are involved in every military operation—including the Gulf War—from Rapid Reaction Force (Force d'Action Rapide) units to navy ships.

In France, the existence of military chaplains has come under debate because of the separation of church and state; however, their position has been maintained as of 2004.

Chief Military Chaplain				
	French Army common services	French Navy	French Air and Space Force	National Gendarmerie
Deputy Chief Military Chaplain				
Regional military chaplain				
Military chaplain				
Lay person – military chaplain Catholic chaplaincy of the army				
Reserve military chaplain				

=== Germany ===
==== World War I and before ====
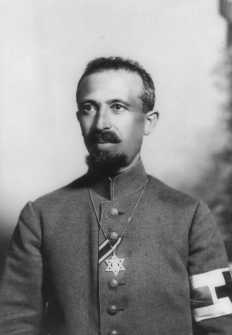
Field Rabbi Dr. Aaron Tänzer during World War I, with the ribbon of the Iron Cross. (Note: He also earned the Knight's Cross of the Order of Franz Joseph, among others. Tänzer served at the front, looked after soldiers, organised soup kitchens for the suffering populace and served in military hospitals.)The brassard of the red cross shows him as noncombatant. He wears the Star of David as insignium.

Initially only Christian chaplains worked in German armies. Only after the French Revolution did Jews become citizens with equal rights in Germany for the first time. An integration of Jewish soldiers within the army gave the German Reich the opportunity to recognize the Jewish urge to fight for the German "Fatherland". The times of common Christian suppression and supremachy status changed and more and more German Jews served in the liberal French Armies of the German territories under French influence, e.g. in the Bavarian army.

In Prussia, king Frederick the Great also showed religious tolerance, but in case of the Jews he exerted intolerance. The Jews were divided into six classes, and only the privileged first class had de facto equal rights as citizens. Very few Jewish soldiers in the Prussian army of the 18th century left historical traces, e.g. Konstantin Nathanel of Salomon, who was promoted to general in 1760. Although the Jewish presence in Germany is older than Christianity, the first "field rabbinat" was introduced during World War I. The German Kaiserreich appointed c. 30 military rabbis. Field rabbi Dr. Leo Baeck wrote the "Israelite Field Prayer Book".

==== World War II ====
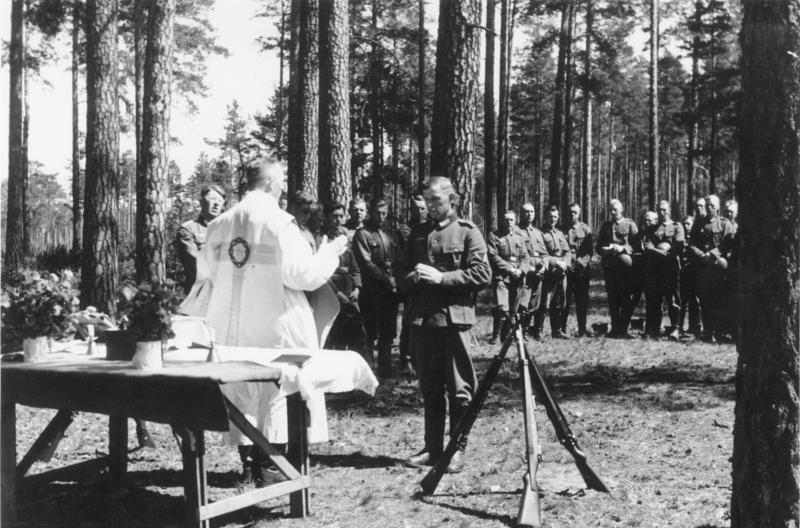
German Christian Field Service for German Soldiers during WWII, the army chaplain gives segen to the German troops with "God with us" on their belt buckle, 1941; 95% of all Germans being Christians

Germany had a tradition of appointing Catholic and Evangelical military chaplains and Jewish military field rabbis. This was continued in the Army and Navy of the Wehrmacht, for the Roman Catholic and Protestant denominations only. A total of 95% of all Germans being Christian, German soldiers during Nazi times continued to belong to the churches and had the words "Gott mit uns" (God with us) on the belt buckles of every Army and Navy enlisted men and non-commissioned officers. Despite this proportion of Christians, the totalitarian national socialistic government of the German Reich tried to weaken the authority and influence of the churches over their German adherents. Besides the international Jewish question, the international character of the Catholic church was another challenge. A few Catholics who devoutly resisted the Nazis, suffered imprisonment and hardship. The case was solved by the Reichskonkordat (1933) between the Holy See and Nazi Germany. The government of the German Reich early established a pastoral ministry for the German Army and the Reichskonkordat settled the appointment of an Army bishop. Therefore, the military chaplains could more freely operate out of the Catholic hierarchy. Franz Justus Rarkowski, S.M., became ordained the Catholic military Field Bishop (Feldbischof) of Nazi Germany in 1938 until 1945.

German military chaplains who served the Wehrmacht were part of the German mainstream and lent the Nazi war effort legitimacy. The Christian military chaplains served between strange poles. While the Nazi ideology was at its core anti-Christian, 95% of Germans were baptized Christians. German soldiers during the Nazi era continued to belong to the churches and had the words "Gott mit uns" (God with us) on their belt buckles. "Being a chaplain in the German army had always been a prestigious position and the Nazis wanted people who represented that old military tradition (..) and not sow discord or division. They wanted people who were not troublemakers." The German military chaplains mostly wanted to bring the word of the Christian God to men in the field and to deliver the sacraments, make their families proud and serve their country. "The motives of the chaplains were not unusual, (..) their noble, personal and professional motives turned them into a legitimating force in a war of annihilation." Military chaplains in Nazi Germany were rigorously screened. First, names were put on the desks of the local civilian bishops, and then the names had to be approved by the according Ministry for Church Affairs. Eventually the names were cleared by the military's chaplaincy office and the Gestapo ("Secret State Police").

===== Organization and clothing =====
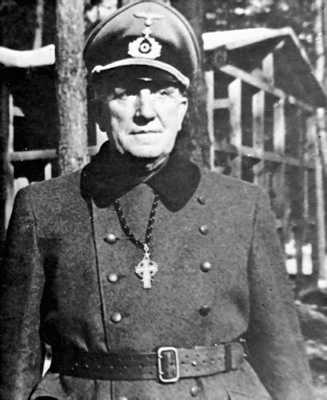
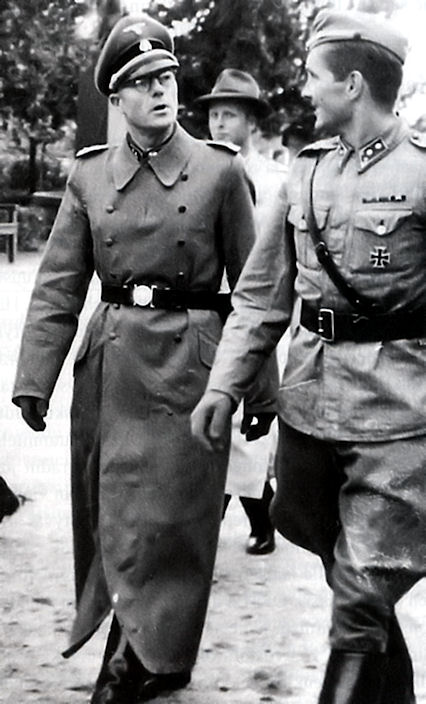
Waffen SS Chaplains: Obersturmbannführer Jean de Mayol de Lupé and Obersturmbannführer Kalervo Kurkiala (right)

Throughout the Third Reich period, the Army and Navy had military chaplains. When needed, other branches of the armed forces acquired chaplains from the Army or Navy or from nearby parish. On an occasion the SS units also had chaplains. In the Heer (Army), military chaplains were organized into Group 3b (Pastoral Group) of the General Army Office under the Army High Command. In mid 1935, four groups of military chaplains were introduced. In 1936, similar groups were introduced for the Kriegsmarine although the evolution over time was different. The groups are as follow.

- Oberpfarrer (Higher Priest)
- Pfarrer (Priest)
- Standortpfarrer im Hauptamt (Garrison Priest in Main Office)
- Standortpfarrer im Nebenamt (Garrison Priest for Outside Appointment)

German military chaplains did not get into the ordinary military rank system, but received privileges like any other regular officers. Army chaplains had four different types of clothing:

- Feldbluse (Field Dress). Field dress was identical for enlisted men, non-commissioned officers, and officers, and was worn on the battlefield. For military chaplains, the field dress was worn with officer-quality collar patches and without shoulder boards. Long trousers with shoes or breeches with officer boots could be worn. Two-pronged officer's belt was used.
- Dienstrock (Service Dress). Service dress was the typical dress for officers, with high-quality materials and tailor-made. For military chaplains, the field dress was worn with officer-quality collar patches and without shoulder boards. Service dress was normally used behind the lines although photographic evidences also show this kind of uniform was worn on the battlefield. Long trousers with shoes or breeches with officer boots could be worn. Two-pronged officer's belt was used, sometimes with cross strap.
- Überrock (Frock Coat). Frock coat was used for formal occasions and when ordered, and worn over the service dress. The piping was violet.
- Mantel (Overcoat). Overcoat worn by military chaplains was identical to those worn by officers. However, no shoulder boards were attached. This was worn over the field dress or service dress.

No weapon was permitted to be carried by chaplains, but one photographic evidence shows a chaplain with a pistol holster on his left waist.

For the headdresses of the Army chaplains, the most common were:

- Schirmmütze (Visor Cap). Officer-quality visor cap with violet as the branch color (Waffenfarbe) for military chaplains. Between the national eagle and cockade, there was a small Gothic cross, either made of metal or embroidered.
- Feldmütze (Field Cap). Officer-quality field cap with silver pipings and violet soutache as the Waffenfarbe. Between the national eagle and cockade, there was a small Gothic cross, usually embroidered.

All the buttons, national eagles, cockades, Gothic crosses, and cap chinstraps were silver for military chaplains and gold for Field Bishops. The collar patches had violet underlay and violet piping for Catholic chaplains, and field grey underlay and violet piping for Protestant (Evangelist) chaplains.

For the Kriegsmarine, the uniform was identical to naval jacket of regular officers, but without sleeve laces and with chaplain collar patches. The collar patches were different to those of the Army. Two-prong officer's belt or brocade belt could be worn.

Although the official regulation states that military chaplains had to wear golden pectoral cross, there were two standard-issue crosses that were worn:

- For Catholic chaplains, Corpus Christi was present on the cross. The cross itself was made either of metal or silver, with black wood insert. Long metal chains went through a loop at the top of the cross to be worn around the neck.
- For Protestant (Evangelist) chaplains, the cross was plain and made of metal or silver. Long metal chains went through a loop at the top of the cross to be worn around the neck.

Photographic evidences show numerous variety of pectoral crosses worn by German military chaplains during World War II.

Oftentimes, German military chaplains were issued an armband with a red cross sign and violet stripe to show their neutrality on the battlefield, in accordance with the Geneva Conventions, which designated chaplains as neutral parties. This was called Armbinde mit Neutralitätsabzeichen (Armband with Neutrality Sign).

Among other things, military chaplains also wore standard liturgical vestments such as chasuble, cope, and stole.

===== Gallery =====
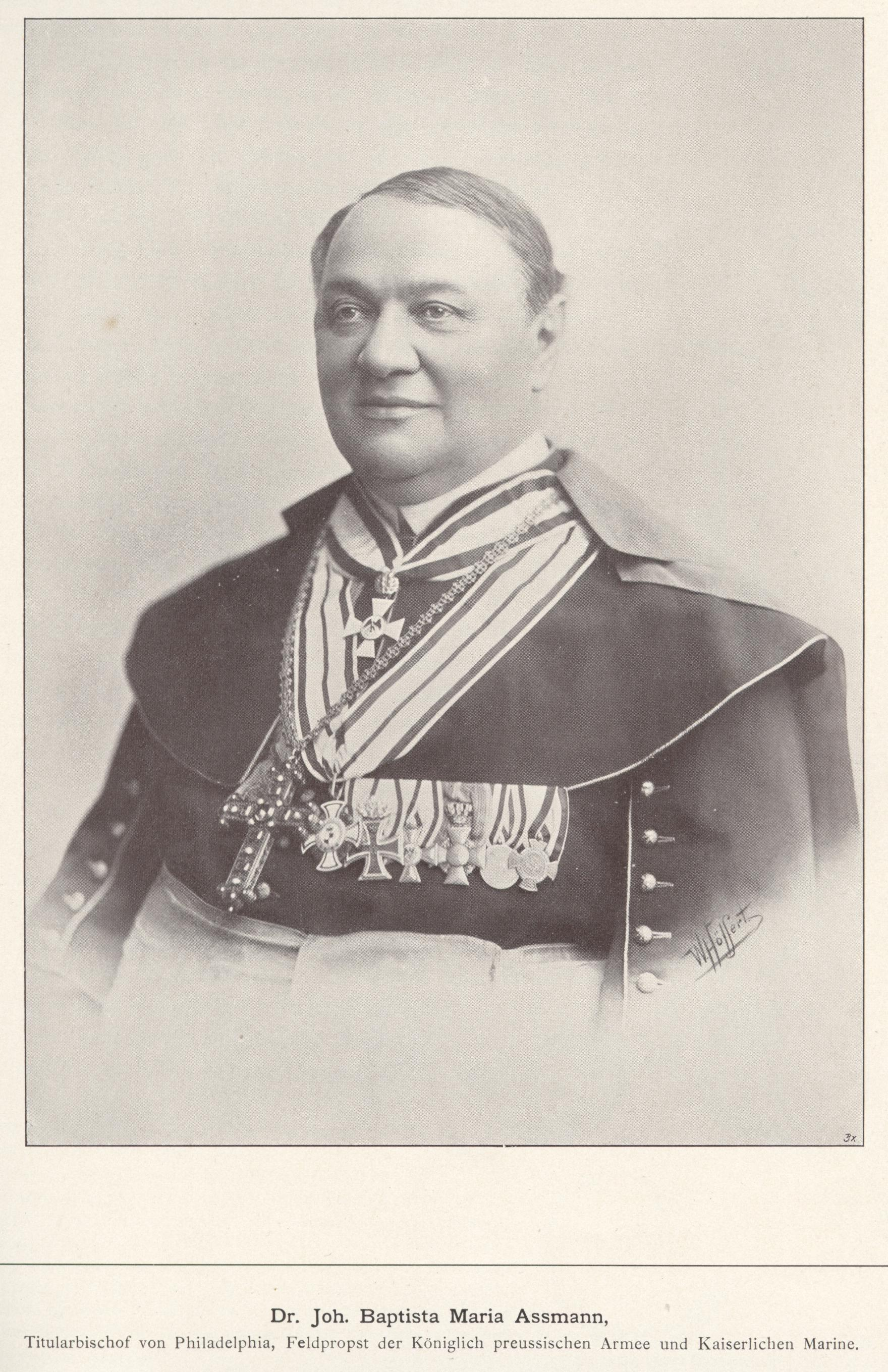
Johannes Maria Assmann, Catholic Prussian military bishop, 1899

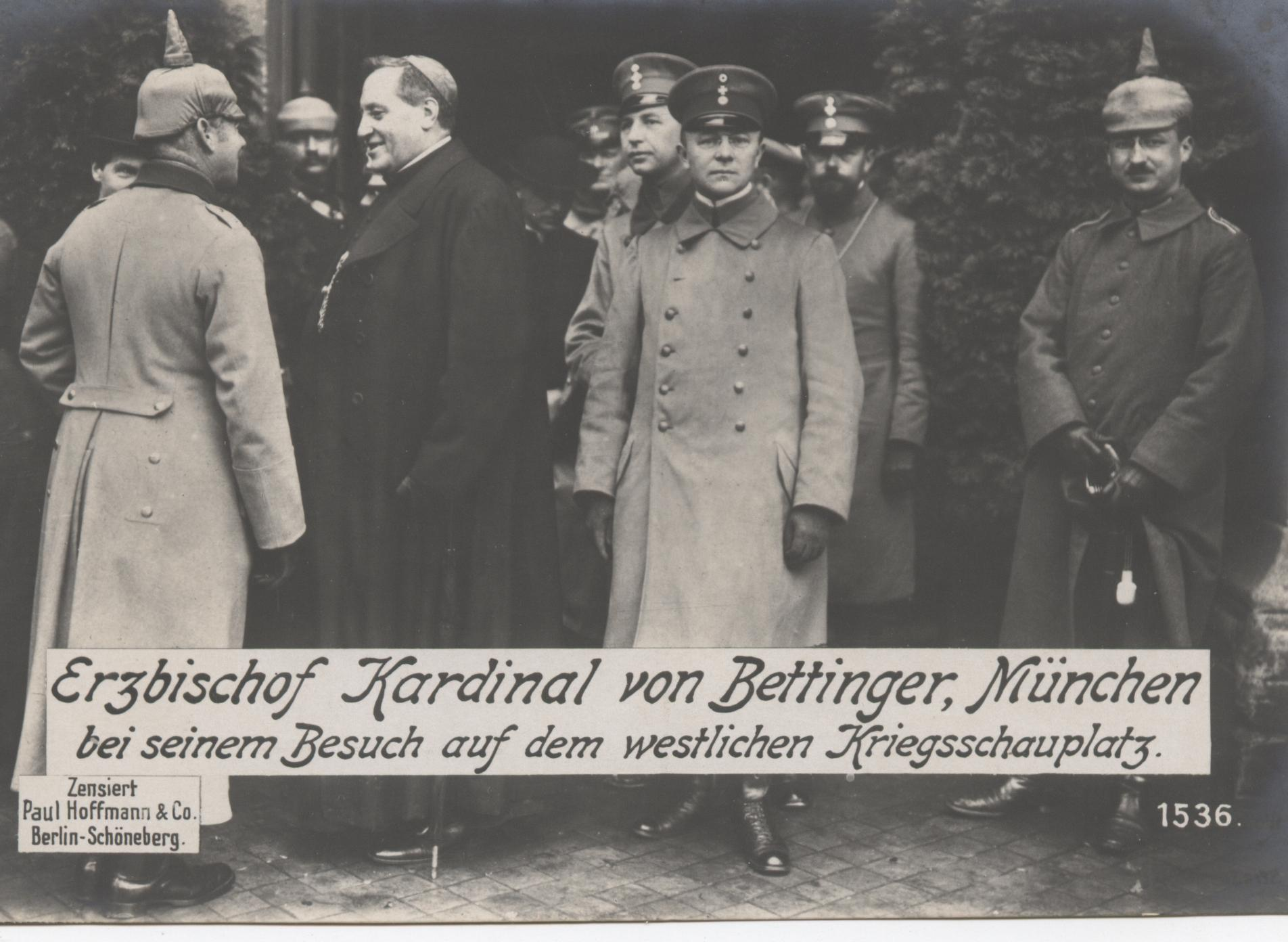
Catholic Archbishop Cardinal Bettinger visiting the German Western Front, 1916

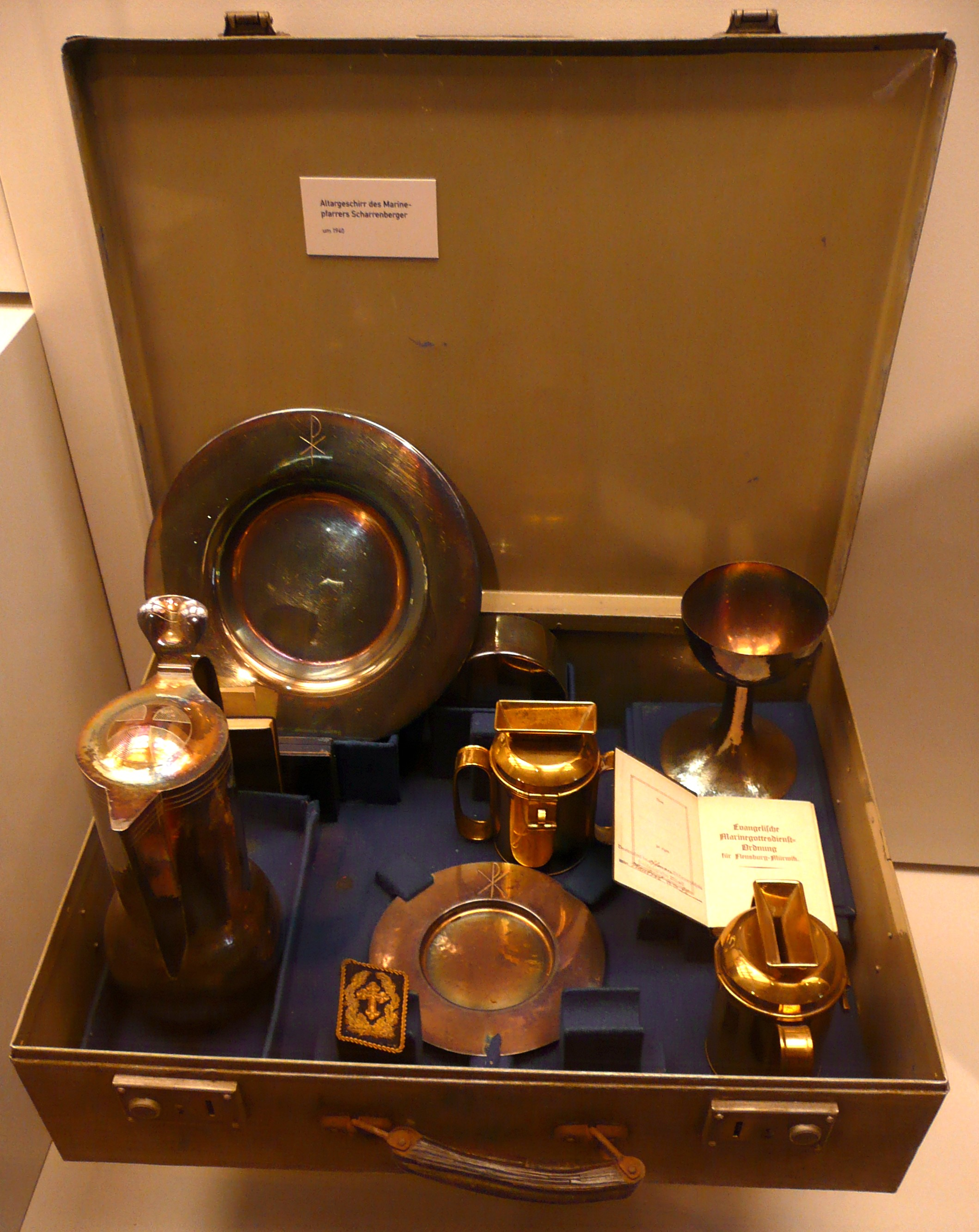
German Kriegsmarine suitcase with altar dishes of a Protestant military chaplain, 1940

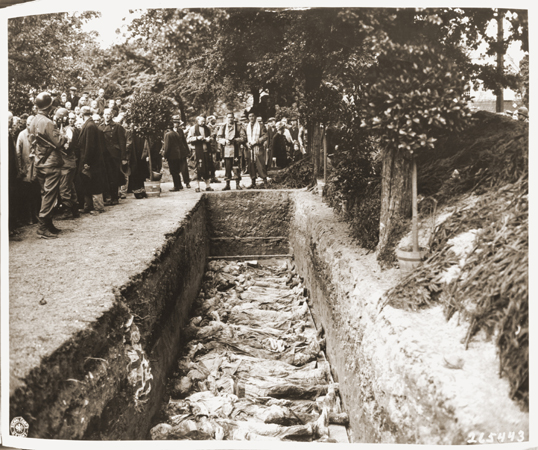
Liberated foreign Protestant, Catholic and Jewish chaplains conduct funeral services for the reburial of 71 political prisoners, exhumed from a mass grave near Solingen, Germany, in front of the city hall, May 1945

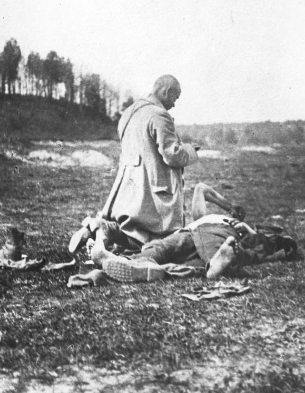
Polish–Soviet War, chaplain anointing a dying soldier

==== Federal Republic of Germany ====
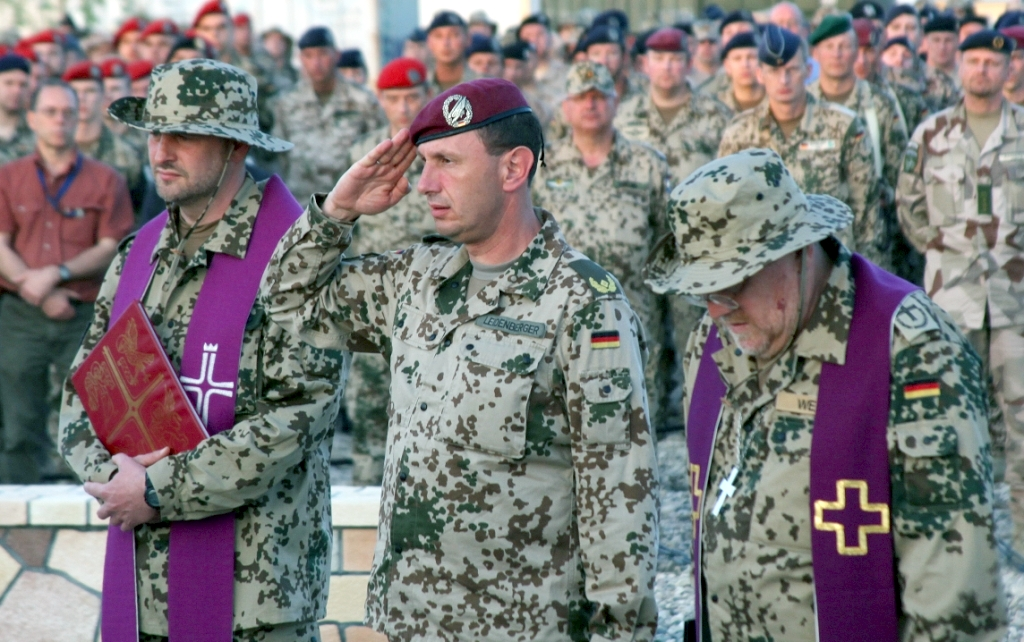
Ecumenicism in line of succession: Dean Dr. Slaczka, Brig Gen Leidenberger, and Chaplain Weeke at a funeral service, ISAF, 2009

German religious constitutional law and its state-church law is involved in the democratic national identity of modern Germany, especially in various articles of the German Constitution. Initially, a "military-chaplaincy" contract was only signed between the state and the Protestant Church, but was extended to all other religious communities for reasons of parity. Furthermore, the 1930s Reichskonkordat between the Holy See and Germany is still in force. In Germany, military chaplains of the Bundeswehr have no rank but have a special civilian status as part of the armed forces. Military rabbis (Militärrabbiner) or chaplain were banned during Hitler's rule and were reintroduced to the German military on 29 May 2020, by the Germany Parliament into law since 1957. It is the first expansion of the law on the military pastoral care. The Jewish chaplains serve the Bundeswehr's estimated 300 Jewish service members.

=== Israel ===
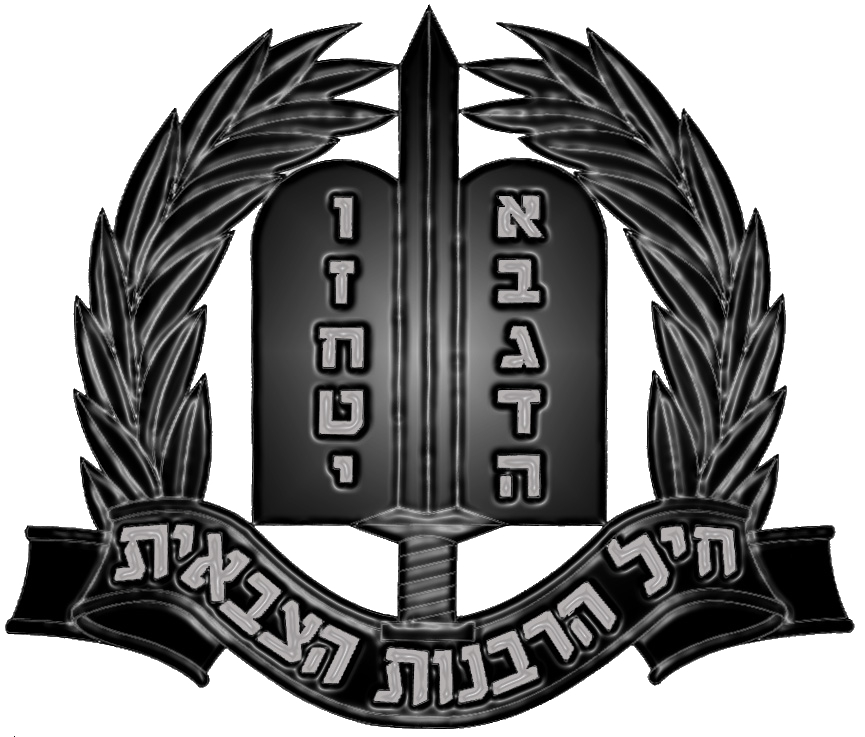
The Israeli Defense Force (IDF) Rabbinate Corps Insignia

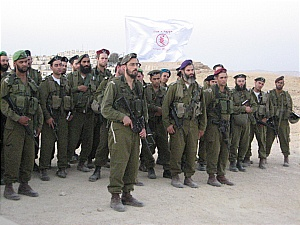
Military Rabbinate rabbis of the Israel Defense Forces during training, Israel 2009.

The Military Rabbinate is a unit in the Israel Defense Forces that provides religious services for military personnel, Jewish and non-Jewish, and makes decisions on issues of religion and military affairs. The Military Rabbinate is headed by the Chief Military Rabbi, who carries the rank of a Brigadier General.

The Military Rabbinate constitutes the body responsible for religious institutions in the military. In every unit or military base there are Military Rabbinate military personnel assigned responsibility for conducting or coordinating religious services, overseeing kashrut laws of the kitchen, and the maintenance of the synagogue and religious supplies. Actively serving military personnel can request Military Rabbinate representatives to perform marriage ceremonies and brit milah for baby boys. The unit also oversees the legal and religious certification of marriages and divorces of individuals during their military service.

The Military Rabbinate is responsible for treating the bodies of soldiers in accordance with religious law, including the identifications and post-mortem treatment of bodies, and conducting military funerals. The Military Rabbinate also coordinates the burial of enemy soldiers and the exhuming of bodies in conjunction with prisoner exchanges.

The Military Rabbinate was founded in 1948 by Rabbi Shlomo Goren, who headed it until 1968.

=== Japan ===
In most all naval ships, there is a Shinto Kamidana (神棚, God-shelf, lit).

Japan Maritime Self-Defense Force ships also often contain a Kamidana.

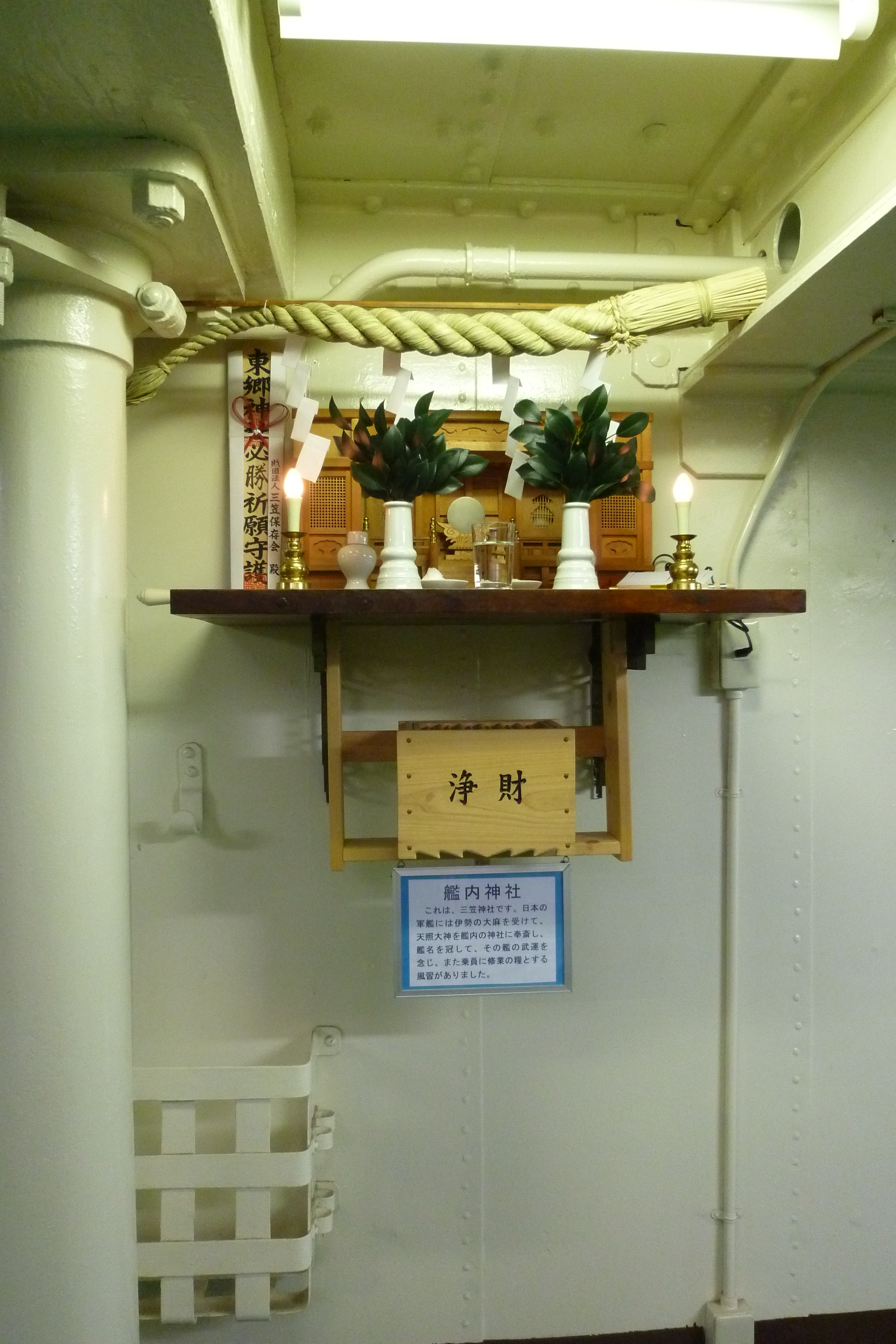
Kamidana of battleship IJN Mikasa

=== Korea ===
Korean Armed Forces operate 4 Religious affirmations of Chaplain Service. Two Christianity denominations such as Protestant and Catholic and non Christianity branches such as Buddhism and Won Buddhism.

Protestant is consisted by Presbyterian denominations such as Tonghap, Hapdong, Koshin and Kijang and other non Presbyterian denominations. Non Presbyterian denominations are consisted by Lutheran, Methodist, Baptist and Salviation Army. Anglican could not have vicar and ministers in the armed forces. Orthodox Church also could not send their ministers to Korean Armed Forces.

Buddhism Chaplains are belonged to Jogye Order of Mahayana. Unlike Protestant and like Catholic Church, only monks whose denominations are Jogye Order could be Military Chaplains for Buddhist.

=== Netherlands ===
In the Netherlands, there are chaplains of Protestant, Catholic, Jewish, Muslim, Hindu, and humanist faiths, provided by the De Diensten Geestelijke Verzorging (DGV) or the Spiritual Care Services. Chaplains are trained in Vormingscentrum Landgoed Beukbergen.

=== Norway ===
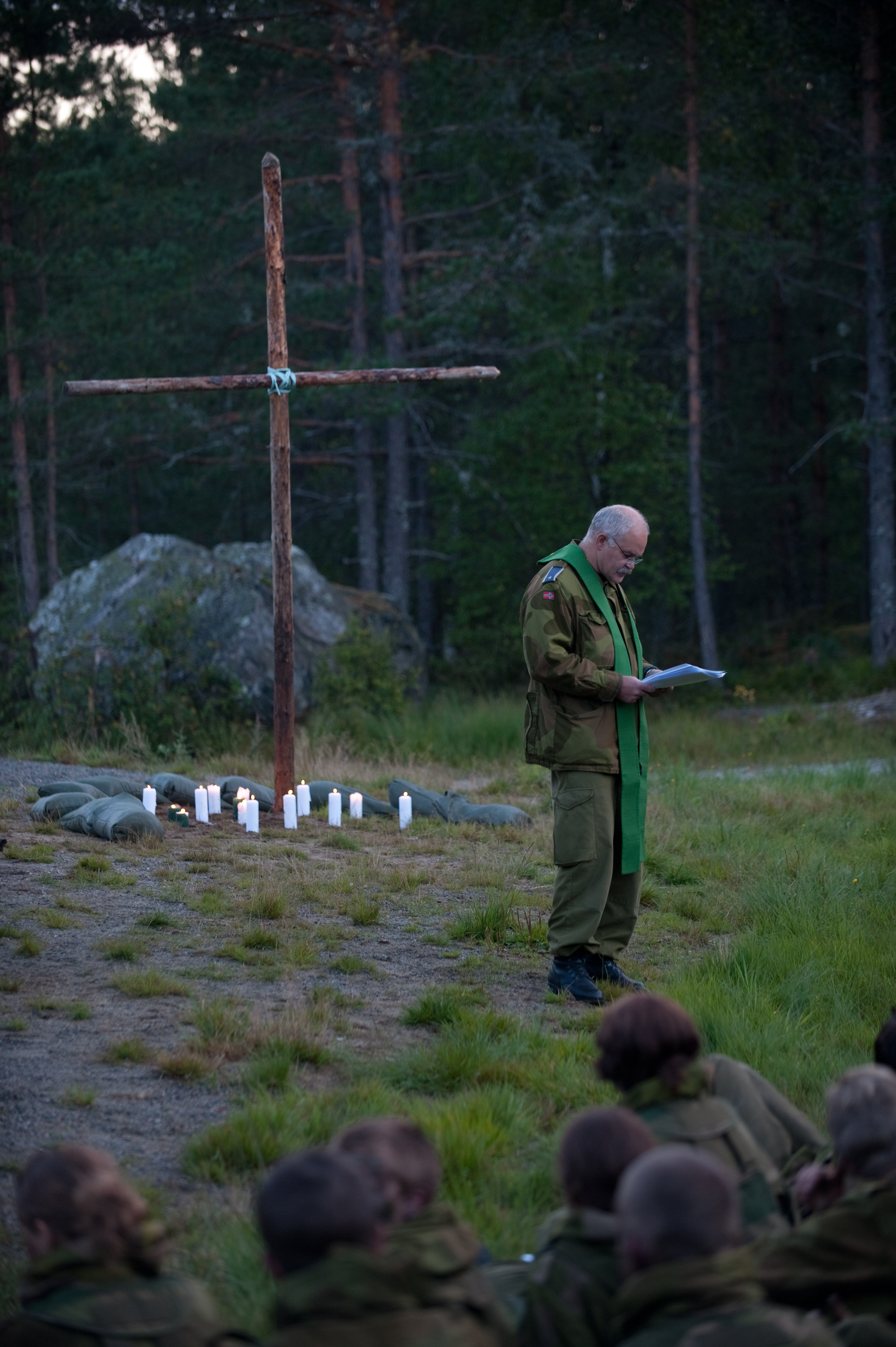
Military chaplain of the Norwegian Army in front of a Christian Cross, Oslo, 2010.

The chaplain service in Norway is called The Norwegian Armed Forces Chaplaincy, and is a joint Norwegian Armed Forces service.

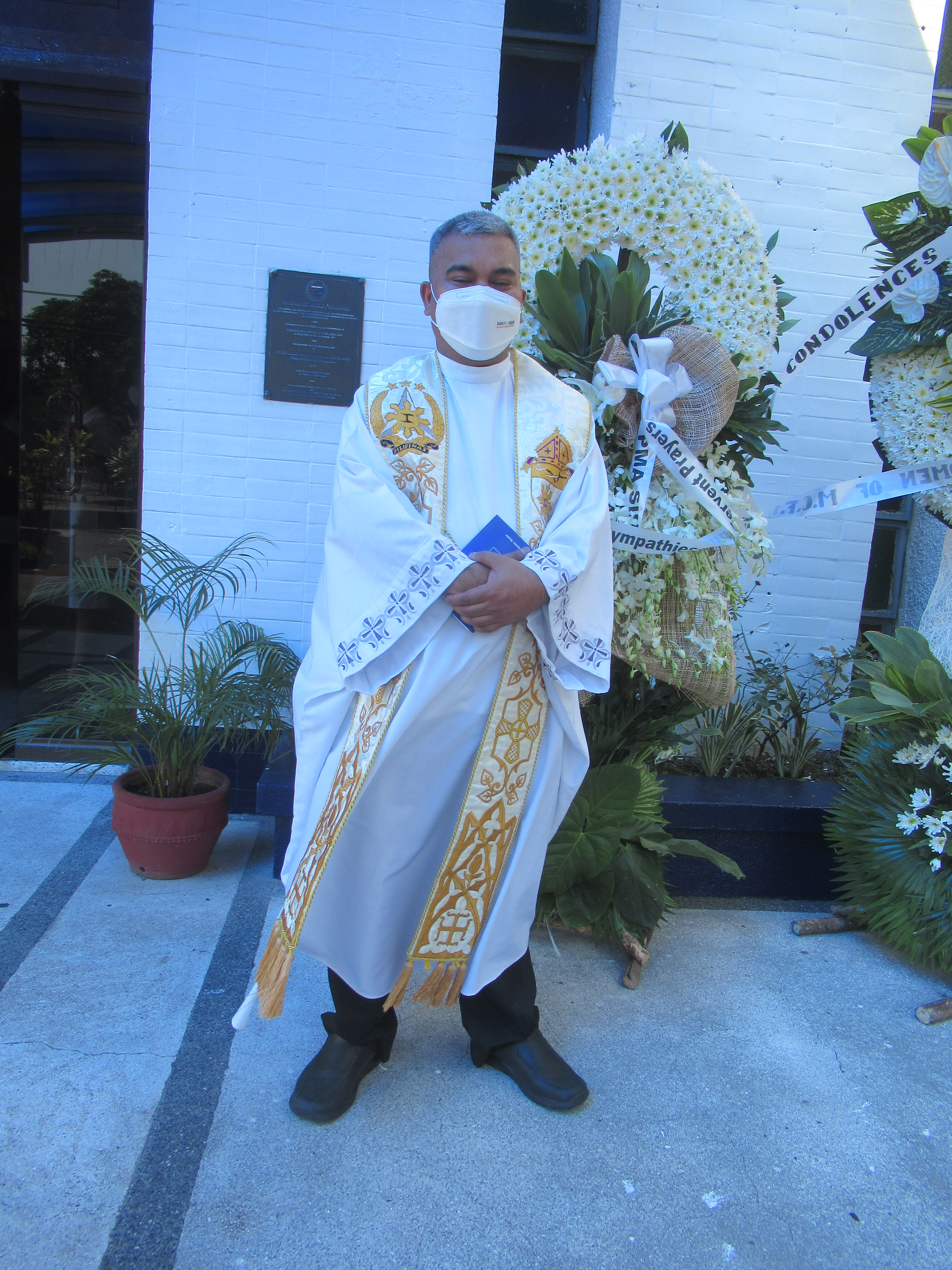
Navy of the Philippines chaplain

=== Poland ===
Chaplaincy in the Polish Armed Forces is led by the Military Ordinariate of Poland. Even during the Communist period, unlike most East Bloc states, the Polish military retained a "General Dean's Office of the Polish Army" to serve as a chaplain unit in the officially atheist military.

=== Russia ===
The position of chaplain in the army and navy of the Russian Empire was present until 1917. In 1914, there were about 730 priests and 150 deacons in the ranks of the Russian Imperial Army, and at the height of the war the number of chaplains in it was about 5,000 people.

The first All-Russian Congress of Military and Naval clergy in the Russian Empire was held in St. Petersburg from 1 to 11 July 1914, it was attended by 49 chaplains representing all 12 military districts of the state. It defined the range of duties of the military clergy: in addition to the priestly tasks themselves, chaplains were instructed to assist in wound dressing, to help in the evacuation of killed and wounded soldiers, to notify the relatives and friends of the killed soldiers of the death of soldiers, to participate in the organization of societies to help the disabled, as well as to take care of the arrangement of travelling libraries and military graves.

In the Russian Federation, Ukraine (and in most of the countries of the former Warsaw Pact) the institution of chaplaincy is being revived.

Airborne Orthodox churches have appeared in the Airborne Forces of the Russian Federation.

=== South Africa ===
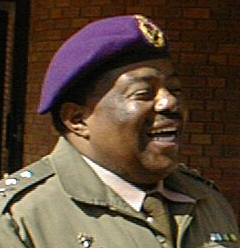
Fumanekile Gqiba, former Chaplain General of the S. African National Defense Force, and former South African Ambassador to Israel, 1998

Prior to 1968, chaplains wore badges of rank as commissioned officers.

Since 1968, however, all chaplains have been senior officers and accorded the protocol status of colonel / captain (navy). They carry the military rank of chaplain and the rank insignia, which is unique to the Chaplains Service, comprises a Chi Rho monogramme surrounded by a triangle. The monogramme represents the first two letters of Christ in Greek. It originates from the days of Constantine, the first Emperor of Rome to grant religious freedom to Christians. His own conversion to the Christian faith was initiated by a dream in which the Chi-Rho monogramme appeared to him. The triangle surrounding the monogramme is the symbolic representation of the Holy Trinity.

During the vision of the monogramme, Constantine heard the Latin words in hoc signo vinces. The English translation of these Latin words is: "In this sign, you will conquer". This is the motto of the Chaplains Service and forms part of the Corps Badge.

In 1998, after working as chaplain general in exile for the ANC, the African National Congress, during the fight against apartheid, Fumanekile Gqiba was appointed as the first black chaplain general for SANDF, the South African National Defense Force. In 2004, Major General Gqiba left the military to accept his appointment as South African Ambassador to Israel.

In the SANDF Chaplain Service, the Hindu faith is represented by a Regular Force chaplain. The rank is Cpln (Vipra) and the mode of address Vipra. The rank insignia is a deepa (lamp) with flame. This is the symbolic representation of enlightenment, the life objective of all Hindus.

Muslims do not have Regular Force chaplains in the SANDF because they are small in number. They are however served by part-time workers through the Chaplains Service of the SANDF and are addressed according to their religious customs as imams.

Christian chaplains are generally referred to and addressed as Padre. They may however, be addressed according to the practice of their religious bodies e.g., Father, Pastor, Umfundisi (Zulu and Xhosa), Moruti (Sotho), Dominee (Afrikaans) etc. The official written form of address is Cpln (for chaplain) followed by the appropriate ecclesiastical title of the respective chaplain e.g., Cpln (Rev), Cpln (Fr), Cpln (Pastor), Cpln, etc.

Along with chaplains from many other nations in the southern region of the continent of Africa, South African chaplains participate in SARMCA, the South Africa Regional Military Chaplains Association, which is a component organization of SADC, the Southern African Development Community.

South African Military Chaplains Insignia

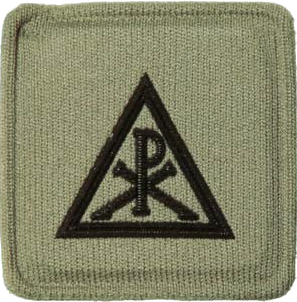
Chaplain Christian Rank Insignia

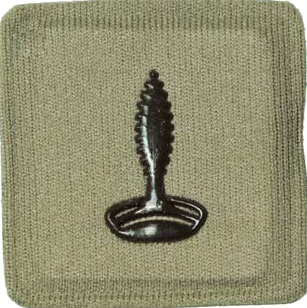
Chaplain Hindu Rank Insignia

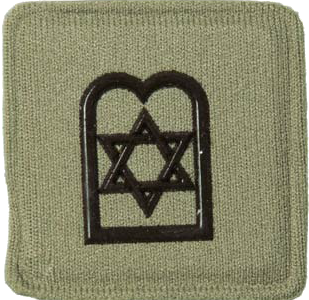
Chaplain Jewish Rank Insignia

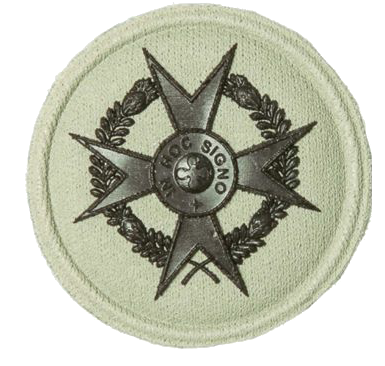
Chaplain Christian badge

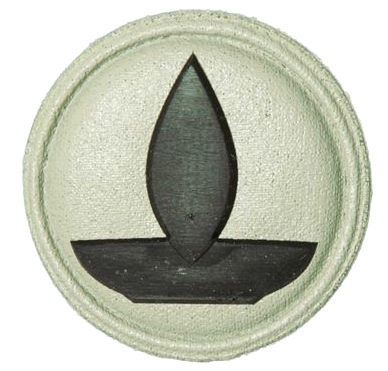
Chaplain Hindu badge

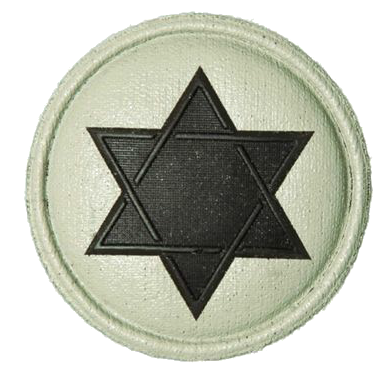
Chaplain Jewish badge

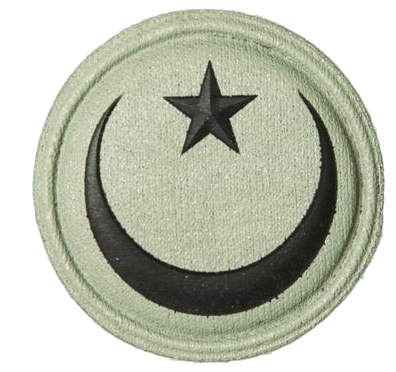
Chaplain Muslim badge

=== Ukraine ===
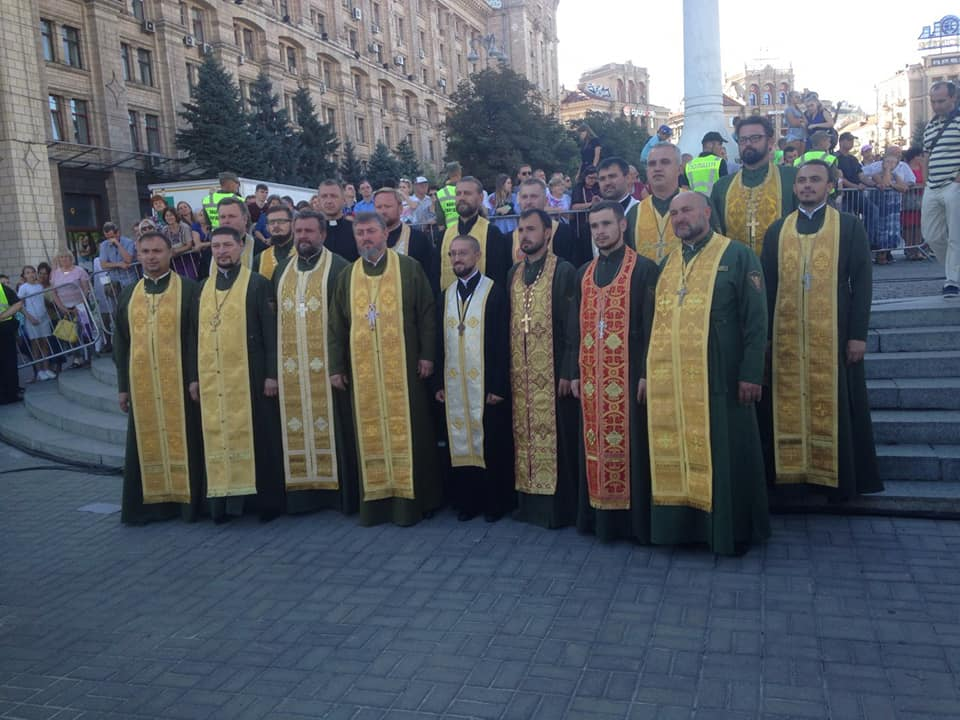
Military chaplains at the rehearsals for the 2018 Kyiv Independence Day Parade.

In recent years, military chaplains have taken a more important role in the Ukrainian Armed Forces. Since the Russian military intervention in Ukraine that began in 2014, many Ukrainian citizens with a religious background have volunteered to serve in the armed forces as chaplains to certain battalions and regiments in the Ukrainian Ground Forces fighting in the Anti-Terrorist Operation Zone during the War in Donbas. The purpose of utilizing these chaplains, according to Prime Minister of Ukraine Arseniy Yatsenyuk was to boost Ukrainian army morale during the conflict. Originally, the Ukrainian Catholic Church designated around 70 priests to work with their designated units, all of which came from the Catholic, Orthodox and Protestant faiths. The Center of Military Chaplaincy of the Ukrainian Greek-Catholic Church is a notable chaplaincy organization in Ukraine that provides counseling and pastoral care to officers, soldiers and their families. Today, a chaplain is not an official military position, but rather a volunteer service. A notable Ukrainian military chaplain is Ivan Hrynokh, who served with the Nachtigall Battalion during the Second World War.

=== United Kingdom ===
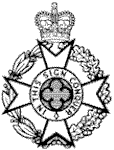
Cap Badge of the Royal Army Chaplains' Department

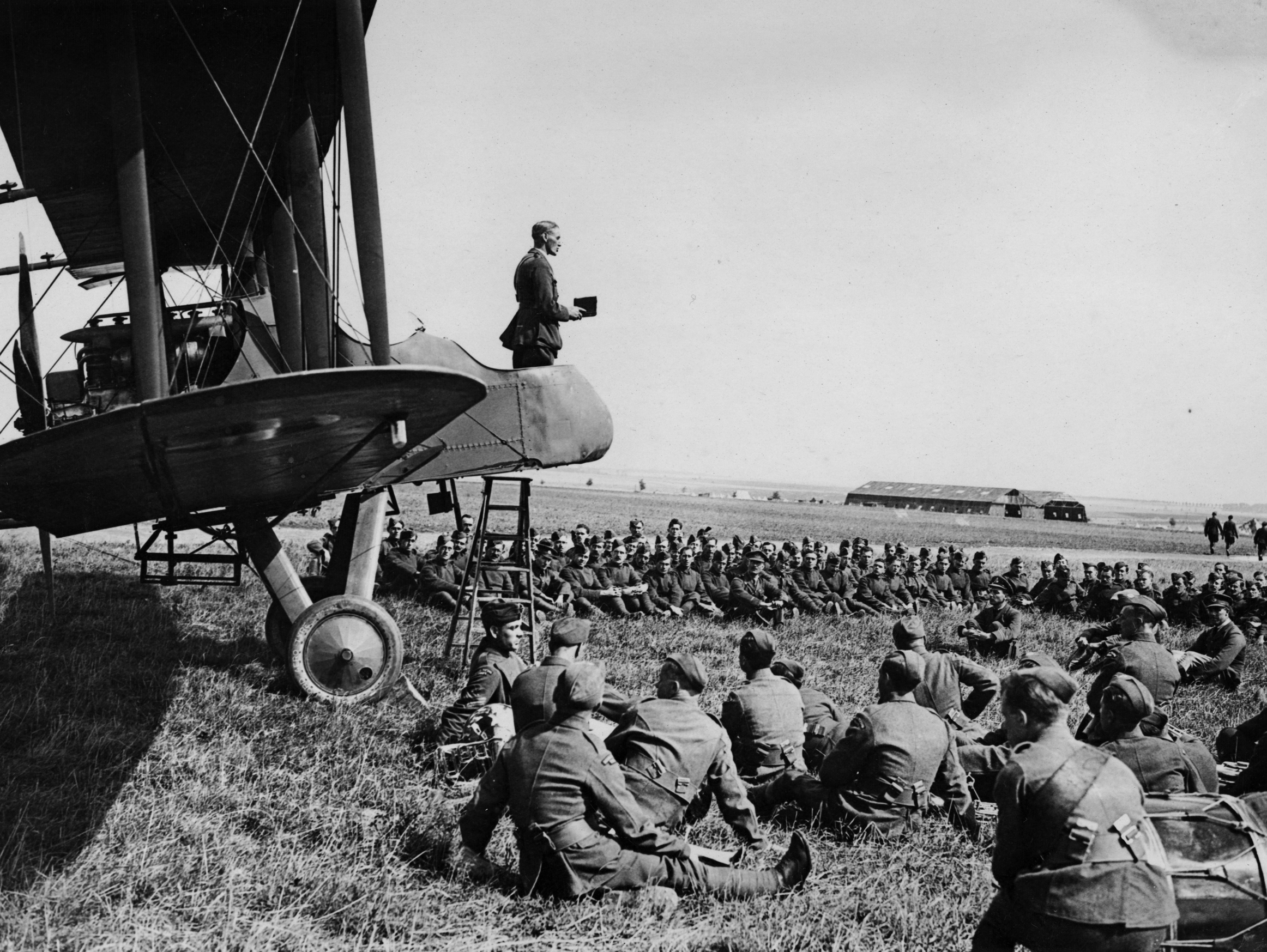
A chaplain conducting a service in France during World War I

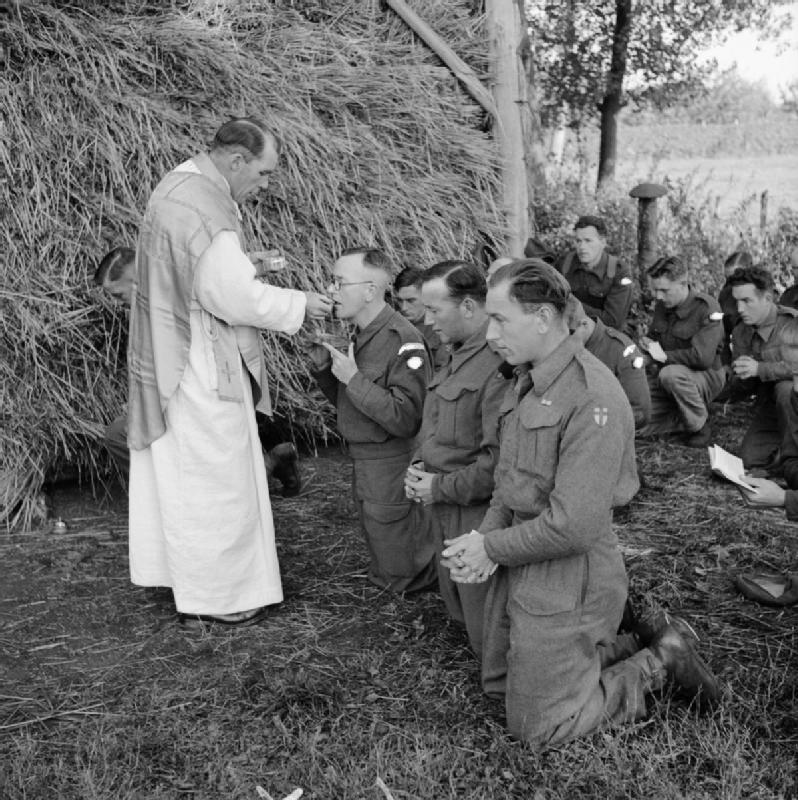
Father C. V. Murphy carries out Mass in a Dutch field in the front line, 6 October 1944

The first English military-oriented chaplains were priests on board proto-naval vessels during the eighth century AD. Land based chaplains appeared during the reign of King Edward I, although their duties included jobs that today would come under the jurisdiction of military engineers and medical officers. A priest attached to a feudal noble household would follow his liege lord into battle. In 1796 the Parliament of Great Britain passed a Royal Warrant that established the Army Chaplains' Department in the British Army.

The department was awarded its "Royal" prefix in 1919 in recognition of their chaplains' service during World War I, and the current form of military chaplain dates from that era. A chaplain provides spiritual and pastoral support for service personnel, including the conduct of religious services at sea or in the field. In the Royal Navy, chaplains are traditionally addressed by their Christian name, or with one of many nicknames (Bish; Sin-Bosun; Devil Dodger; Sky-pilot etc.). In the Army and Royal Air Force, chaplains are traditionally referred to (and addressed) as padre or as Sir/Ma'am (although not the latter in the RAF). Many Padres in the British Army will insist on not being referred to as Sir/Ma'am as they are explicitly outside of the chain of command in the units to which they have been attached, which emphasises their pastoral role rather than a command position.

In the Royal Navy, chaplains have no rank other than "chaplain", while in the Army they hold commissioned relative rank but are universally referred to as "padre". On the foundation of the Royal Air Force Chaplains' Branch an attempt was made to amalgamate these differing systems by creating "relative rank", where rank is worn but without executive authority. In practice chaplains of all three services work in similar ways, using what influence and authority they have on behalf of those who consult them or seek their advice.

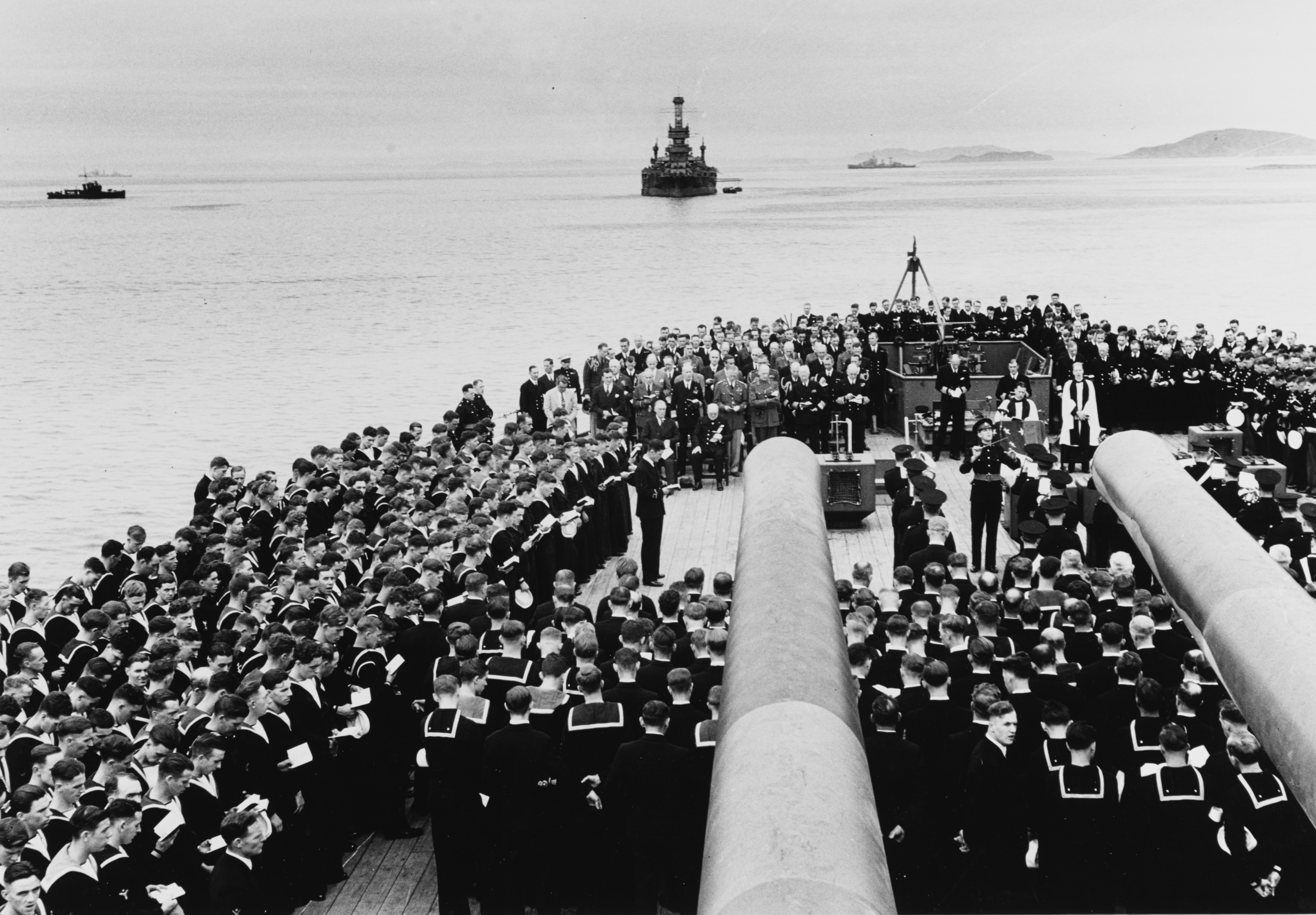
Church service aboard the British battleship HMS Prince of Wales in August 1941

During World War II the head of chaplaincy in the British Army was an Anglican chaplain-general (a major-general), who was formally under the control of the Permanent Under-Secretary of State. An assistant chaplain-general was a chaplain 1st class (full colonel) and a senior chaplain was a chaplain 2nd class (lieutenant colonel).

All chaplains are commissioned officers and wear uniform. Army and Air Force chaplains bear ranks and wear rank insignia, but Navy chaplains do not, wearing a cross and a special version of the officers' cap badge as their only insignia.

Chaplains in the armed forces were at first all Christian or Jewish. The first Jewish chaplain was appointed in 1892 and some 20 to 30 were commissioned during World War II. Until recent times, the Ministry of Defence (MoD) has employed only Christian chaplains, with the Jewish community providing an honorary chaplain under long-standing arrangements, although Jewish chaplains have served in the Territorial Army. In October 2005 the Ministry of Defence appointed four chaplains to the military; one each from the Buddhist, Hindu, Muslim and Sikh faith communities. The Royal Army Chaplains' Museum holds information and archive material relating to the history of the Army Chaplains' Department.

=== United States ===
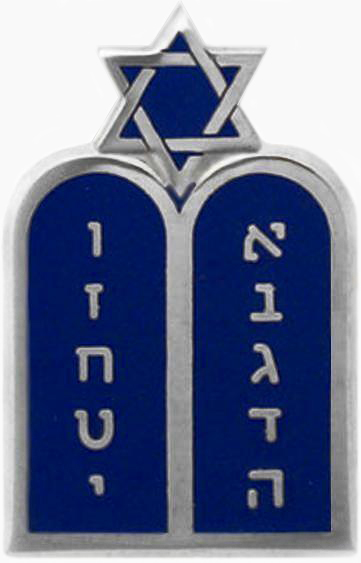
Jewish chaplain insignia, U.S. Air Force

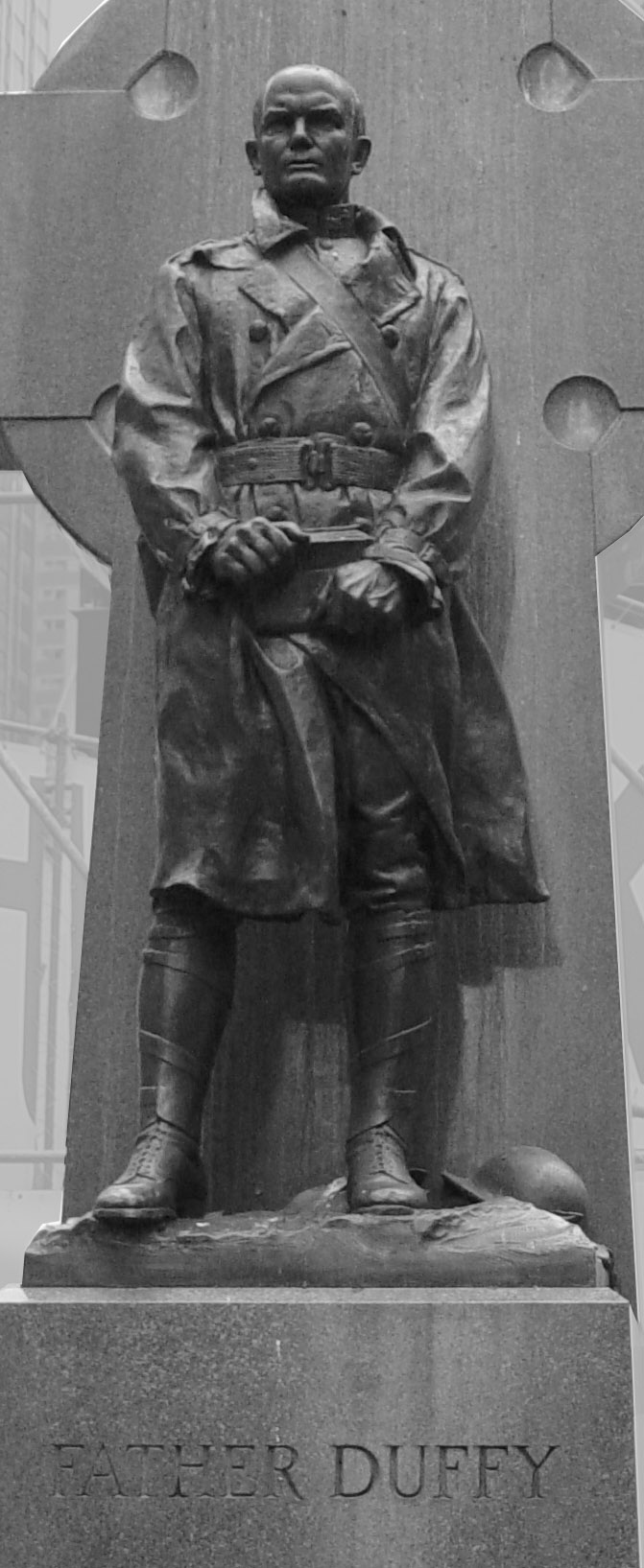
Monument to Catholic Father Francis P. Duffy in Times Square in front of a Celtic cross. He typically was involved in combat and became the most highly decorated cleric in the history of the US Army

In the United States, military chaplains have an officer's rank based on their years of service and promotion selection from among their peers. Chaplains serving in the US Armed Forces wear the uniform of their respective branch of service, and normally wear clerical attire only during the performance of a religious service. The position of rank and chaplain faith group insignia varies in each military department and may vary significantly from one type of uniform to another within a military department. The US Army, Air Force, and Navy (as a component of the Department of the Navy, the Marine Corps is supplied by US Navy chaplains) require an 'ecclesiastical endorsement' from the candidate's faith group (which in the case of the Navy must be one registered with the Department of Defense). There are currently more than 3,000 chaplains serving in the U.S. military.

Among the first US Army Chaplains was Israel Evans who served with George Washington at Valley Forge and during the surrender at Yorktown.

The Civil Air Patrol, the volunteer auxiliary of the US Air Force, also has chaplains, who must meet the same standards for appointment as active-duty Air Force, Air Force Reserve and Air National Guard chaplains. They wear the same insignia as US Air Force chaplains and can be called upon to assist Air Force chaplains.

US military chaplains, both individuals and in groups, have been involved in a number of controversies. Complaints have been made against chaplains for mandatory prayers, coercion, and using government money to promote Evangelical Christianity. Groups representing atheists have pushed for the appointment of someone representing their viewpoint to the chaplaincy. Individual cases include that of Air Force Lt. Col. Garland Robertson, discharged in 1993 after expressing political opinions in a letter to the Abilene Reporter-News and Navy Chaplain Lt. Gordon Klingenschmitt who, against direct orders to him personally, as well as military law and tradition, protested openly and publicly while in uniform against military policies which he believed restricted the free exercise of his religion.

The constitutionality of the US chaplaincy has been the subject of legal challenges and scholarly dispute. One appellate case, Katcoff v. Marsh (1985) upheld the system as a permissible attempt to support service members in the "free exercise" of their religious beliefs, though others have described the details of the chaplaincy system as violations of the legal principles that the federal government maintain neutrality and avoid becoming entangled in religious affairs.

More than 400 chaplains have died while serving in the US military.

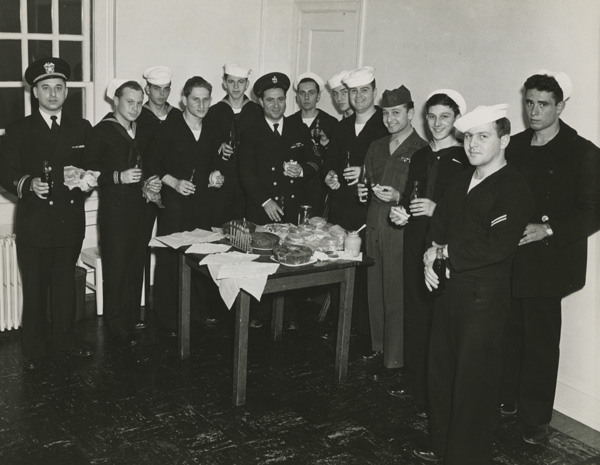
Hanukkah party held for Jewish servicemen, 1952

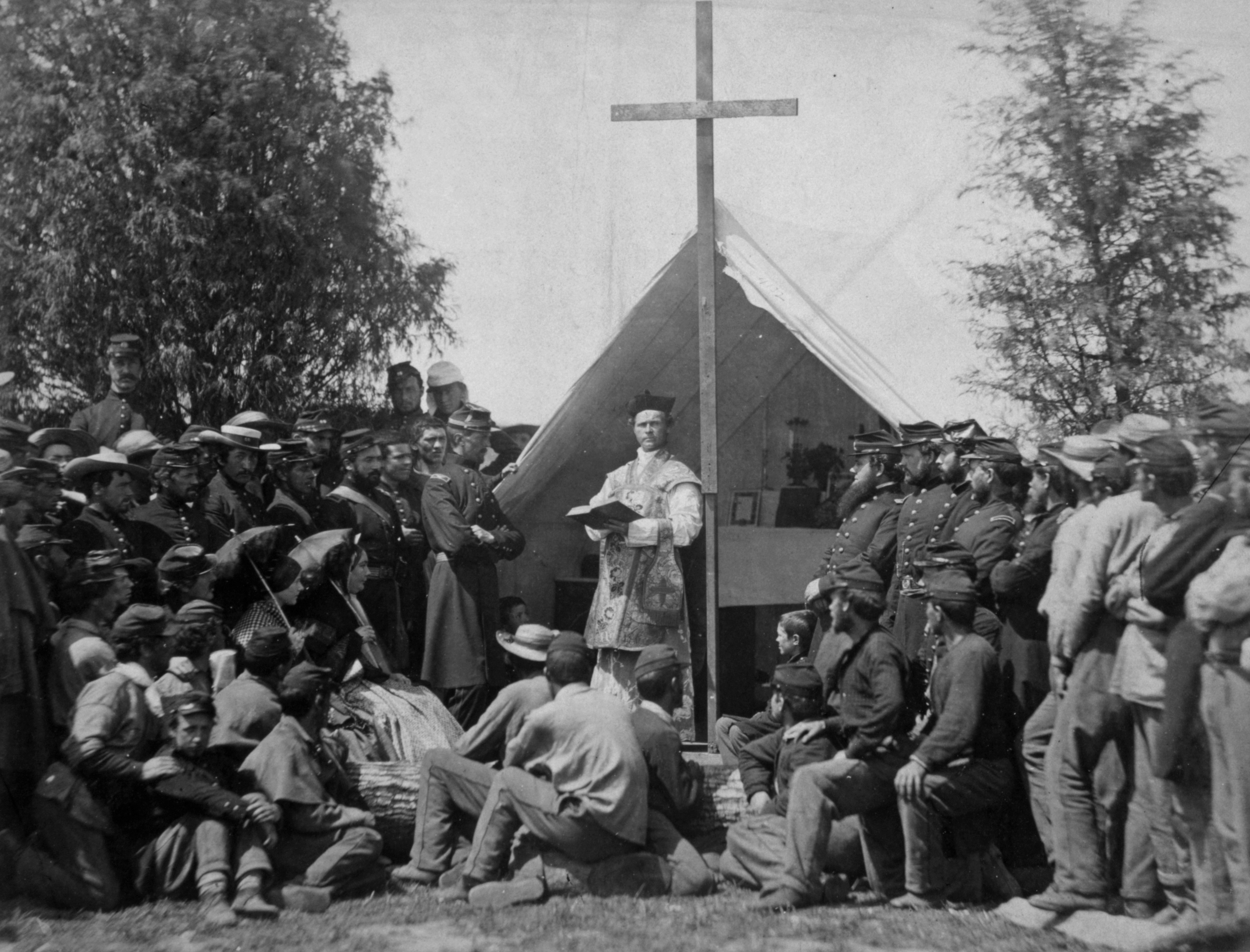
A Roman Catholic army chaplain celebrating a Mass for Union soldiers and officers during the American Civil War (1861–1865).

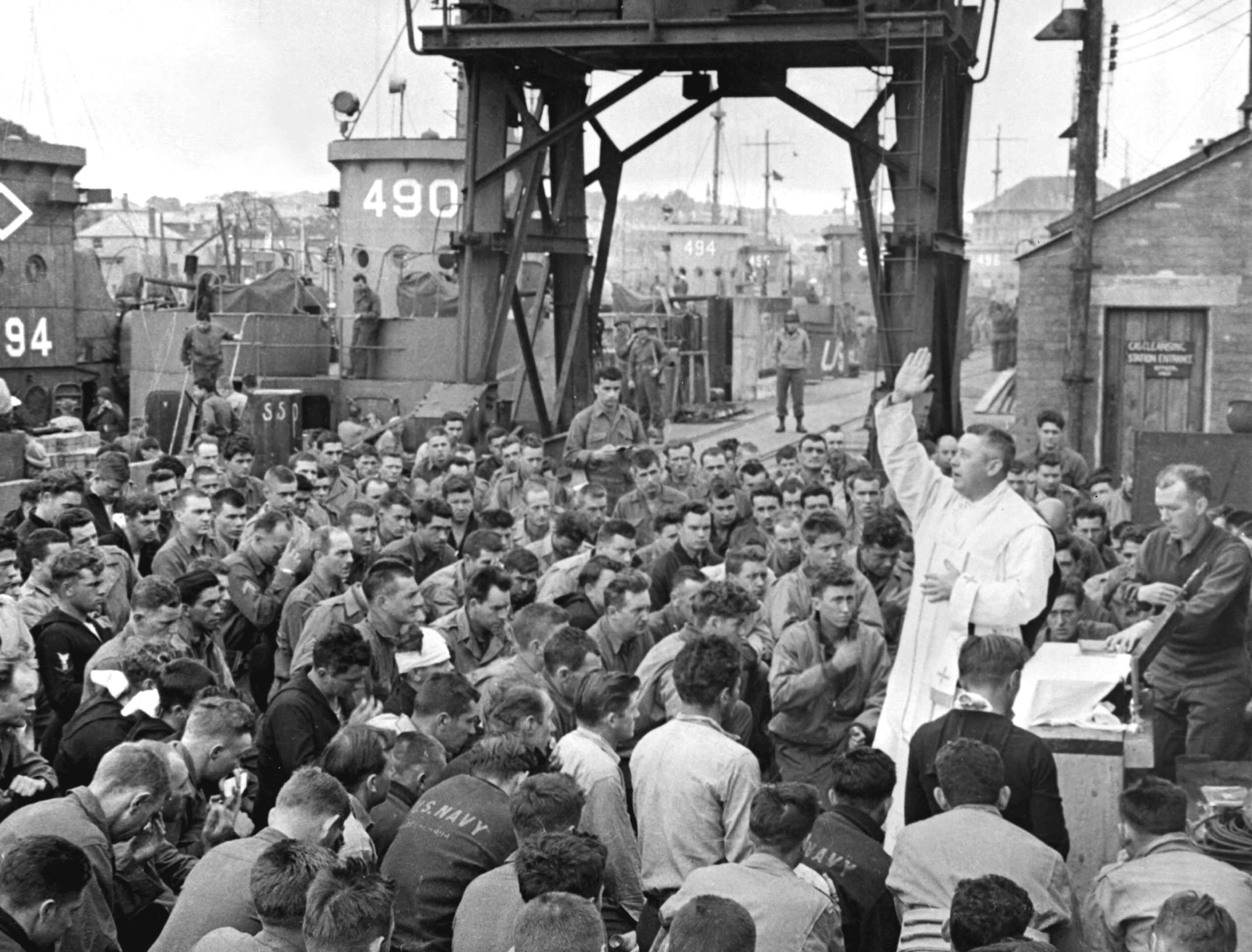
Military Catholic chaplain Father (Major) Waters conducts Divine Services, June 1944

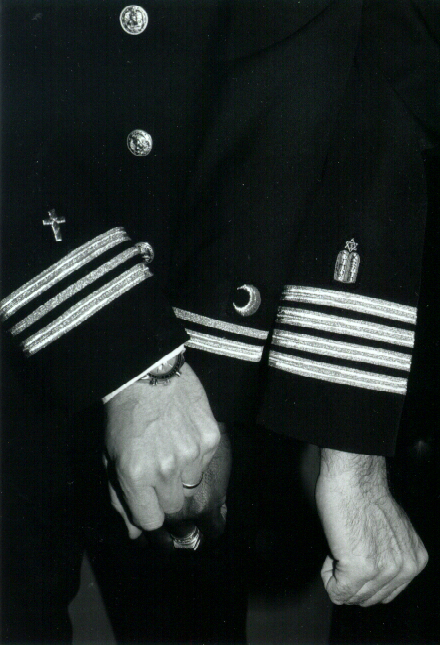
Insignia for Christian, Muslim, and Jewish chaplains on three US Navy chaplains' uniforms

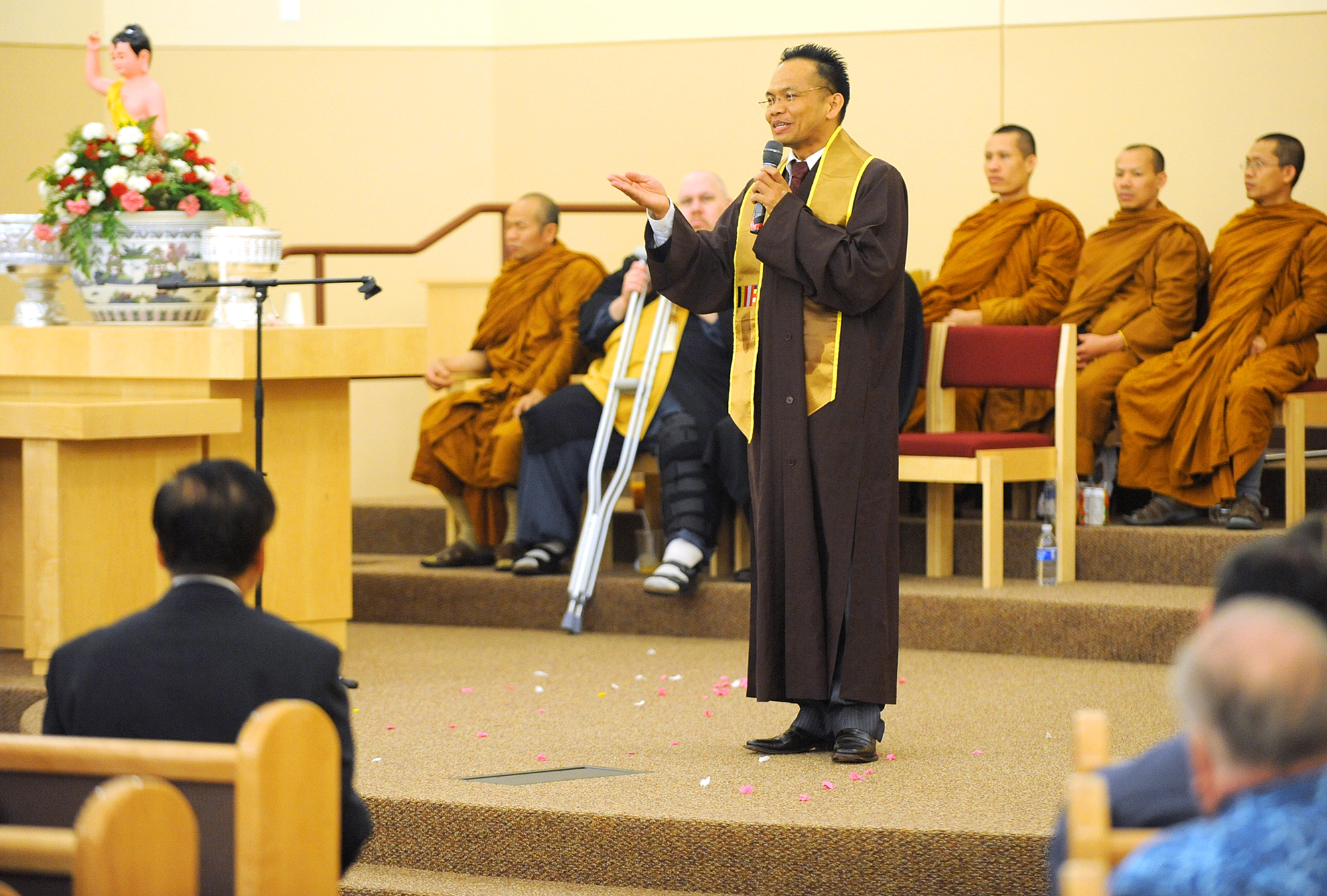
Buddhist US Army Chaplain (Captain) Somya Malasri leads a Buddhist service

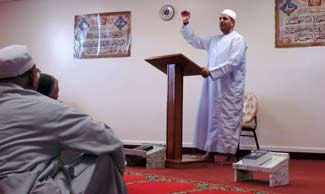
Muslim Air Force Chaplain (Captain) Walid Habash speaks to Muslim troops following a prayer service on Friday, 19 December 2009.'

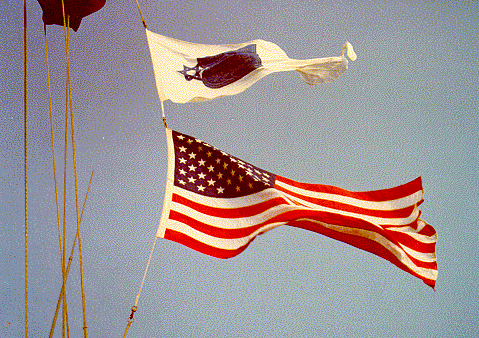
A worship pennant flying above the National Ensign (American flag) on a US Navy ship

== See also ==
- Armed priests
- New Testament military metaphors
- Political commissar — equivalent position in communist/Eastern Bloc militaries
