= Fumanekile Gqiba =

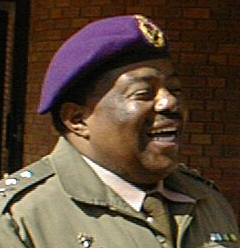
- Major General Fumanekile Gqiba

South African Ambassador to Israel
- In office 2004–2008

Personal details
- Born: 16 May 1951 (age 75) Cape Town, South Africa
- Spouse: Vuyisra Gqiba

Military service
- Allegiance: Republic of South Africa
- Branch: South African Army
- Rank: Major General
- Commands: Chaplain General

Fumanekile "Fumie" Gqiba (born 16 May 1951, in Cape Town) is an Anglican priest, a former chaplain general of the South African National Defense Force (serving at the rank of Major general), and a former South African Ambassador to Israel.

== Biography ==
Fumanekile Gqiba was born in Cape Town, South Africa. Gqiba studied theology at the University of Transkei and was ordained as an Anglican priest. He rose to the rank of commander in Umkhonto We Sizwe (MK or "Spear of the Nation") the guerrilla arm of the African National Congress (ANC).

He later joined the South African National Defense Force (SANDF) as a chaplain, after the military was integrated. In 1998, he was appointed Deputy Chaplain General, and then Chaplain General, responsible for military chaplains of all faiths. During his chaplain service he became an Honorary member of the North Atlantic Treaty Organization (NATO) Military Chaplains Association.

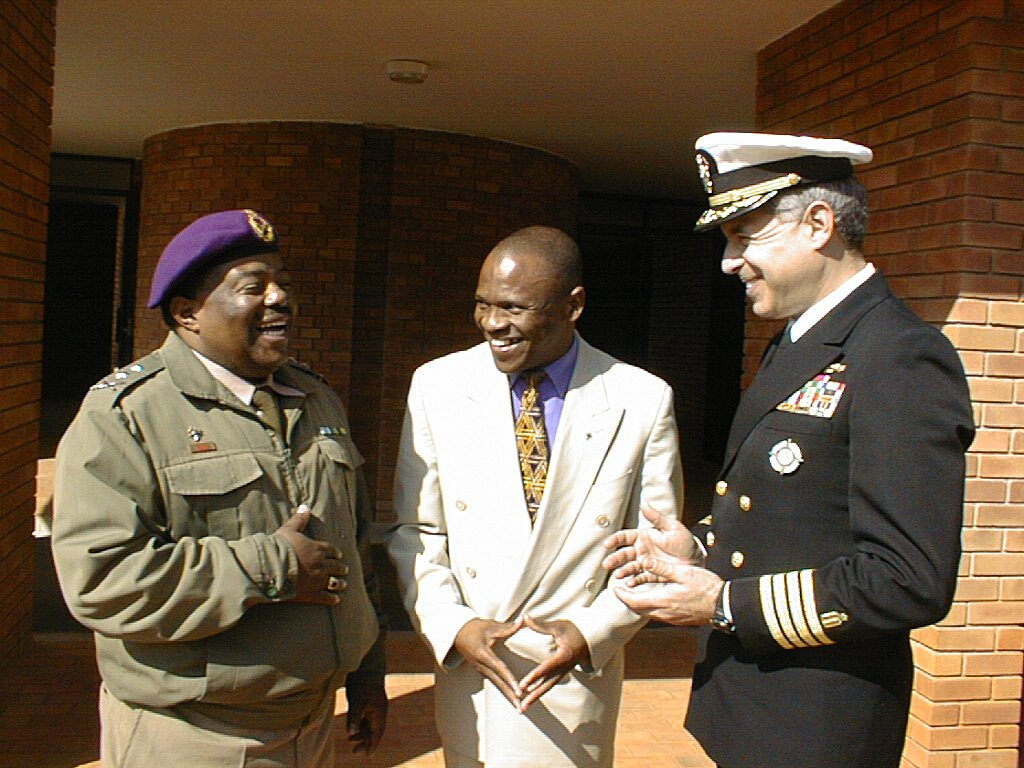
Gqiba (left) as SANDF Chaplain General, with Sabelo Maseko, Chaplain General of Swaziland, and Chaplain (Rabbi) Arnold E. Resnicoff, Command Chaplain for the U.S. European Command

He is also a social scientist, specialising in urban development planning, strategic management, and international relations. In January 2005 he co-founded the Azzurri Construction Company.

Gqiba has stated that the integration of South Africa's military was a matter not only of race, but also of religion – linked to the "first human right – religious freedom." In addition to his efforts to expand religious pluralism within SANDF, including the recruitment of its first Hindu chaplain, Gqiba helped create the Southern African Military Chaplains Association, an association of military chaplains from a number of nations in the southern part of the African continent. A primary purpose of that organisation, according to Gqiba, is the promotion of religious freedom as a human right throughout all the militaries in the region.

He worked with Elijah Loza, a trade unionist in Cape Town to recruit and transport young people for Umkhonto weSizwe, to fight the apartheid policies of South Africa. Gqiba was a founder-member of the ANC's Department of Religious Affairs in exile, in Lusaka, Zambia.

== Diplomatic career ==
In July 2004, Gqiba was appointed to the position of South Africa's Ambassador to Israel serving as South Africa's first black ambassador to that nation. His appointment was linked to the desire of the President of South Africa to make a "dramatic change" in the relationship between South Africa and Israel.

As Ambassador, Gqiba worked to dispel the idea that South Africa was "anti-Israel," but stated that much of the responsibility of strengthening relationships between the two countries belonged to Israel. While Gqiba's predecessors as Ambassador were members of the diplomatic corps in "the old South Africa," Gqiba's credentials in the liberation struggle in South Africa were recognised by some in Israel as a symbol of South Africa's desire to contribute to a solution of the Israeli-Palestinian conflict.

Among Gqiba's achievements as ambassador was a trip to South Africa for Israeli leaders of the then-ruling Likud party, in October 2004. Subsequent to that visit, he brought Ehud Olmert, the Israeli Minister of Trade and Industry, to meet with President Thabo Mbeki, in 2005, followed by a delegation of the African National Congress to meet with Israeli government officials in Israel.

Gqiba's no-nonsense approach to his position was often the subject of press coverage, including his admission that he was never trained as a diplomat, stating that "I'm a military man and I usually say what I think."

Gqiba served as Ambassador to Israel for four-and-a-half years, completing his assignment in 2008. One Israeli news article noted that the "good humor and ready smiles" of both Gqiba and his wife Vuyiswa had "won them many friends." Additionally, the article notes that they will never be able to forget their stay in Israel because the youngest of their children is a not only a sabra (born in Israel), but the Gqibas named her "Israela," in honour of her birthplace.

During Gqiba's term as Ambassador to Israel, he was the subject of an incident at Ben Gurion International Airport where he was allegedly "publicly humiliated and treated in a racist manner" by a border control officer. According to Gqiba, he was returning to Israel from a visit to South Africa when a border control officer confiscated his diplomatic passport, called the police, and treated him in a way he described as degrading, verbally abusive, and "bordering on a breach of basic human rights." Gqiba said that he had never before been treated in such a degrading manner--"even during the apartheid era in South Africa."

In interviews with the press, Gqiba praised Israelis as a "loving people" and stated that it was a problem with one individual, not the Israeli people in general, He said he preferred to handle the issue through official channels and was satisfied with the apology offered by both the Israeli Foreign Ministry and the Israel Airports Authority, which promised to pursue a thorough investigation of the incident.

== Views and opinions ==
Gqiba notes that the anti-apartheid struggle in his nation was different from the Israeli-Palestinian conflict in many ways, including the fact that the former was political, not religious:

"Ours was a political struggle, not a religious one. But central people were highly religious. Here the foundation is religious. Whenever religion is central to the struggle, it's difficult to control. There's hatred, hatred, hatred. It's very dangerous, because people want to prove that their God is superior."

Gqiba believes that Israelis and Palestinians could learn valuable lessons from the achievements of his nation. He stated that in South Africa, "we stopped being foolish and began accepting each other in the image of God," and believes that the day will come for Israels and Palestinians as well, when "It will be a new dawn of sustainable peace in which the children of Abraham will stop slaughtering each other."

Gqiba strongly criticised suicide bombings, calling "suicide terrorism" morally unjustified, against international law, and against the code of the military.

In response to a question about racism in an interview at Harvard Law School, Gqiba said that while much authority in Israel is in the hands of white citizens who came from countries like Poland, and represent Ashkenazic Judaism, it is not possible to define Israel as a "white nation":

"[Some people say]...that Israel is the extension of the racist, white South Africa. ...that was my understanding before I came here. I regarded Jews as whites. Purely whites. But when I came here I discovered that, no, these guys are not purely whites. They are mixed. It's some kind of a, shall we say, a melting pot. You’ve got people from all over the world. You’ve got Indian Jews, you’ve got African Jews, and you’ve got even Chinese Jews, right? I began to say to our comrades, "No, Israel is not a white country."

== Eulogy for chief rabbi ==
Gqiba delivered the eulogy at the funeral of Rabbi Cyril Harris, former Chief Rabbi of South Africa, at the Har Hamenuhot Cemetery in Israel, praising him as a prophet and a hero, who spoke out with a "bold and consistent voice" against the old apartheid system. He said that the rabbi's death "caused our young democratic state to weep," and that "a part of South Africa lies with him."
