= Brazilian Syncretic Religions =

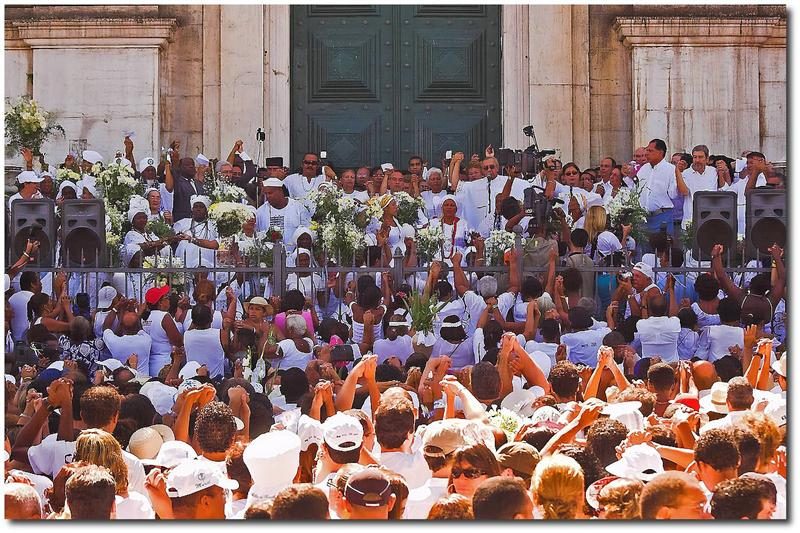
Candomblé members, celebrating a holy day inside a Catholic church.

Research indicates that 44% of Brazilians have two religions. Official data from the Brazilian census indicate that 1,011,507 Brazilians have two religions or follow a syncretic religion. This is in part due to many Brazilian people having parents from different cultures.

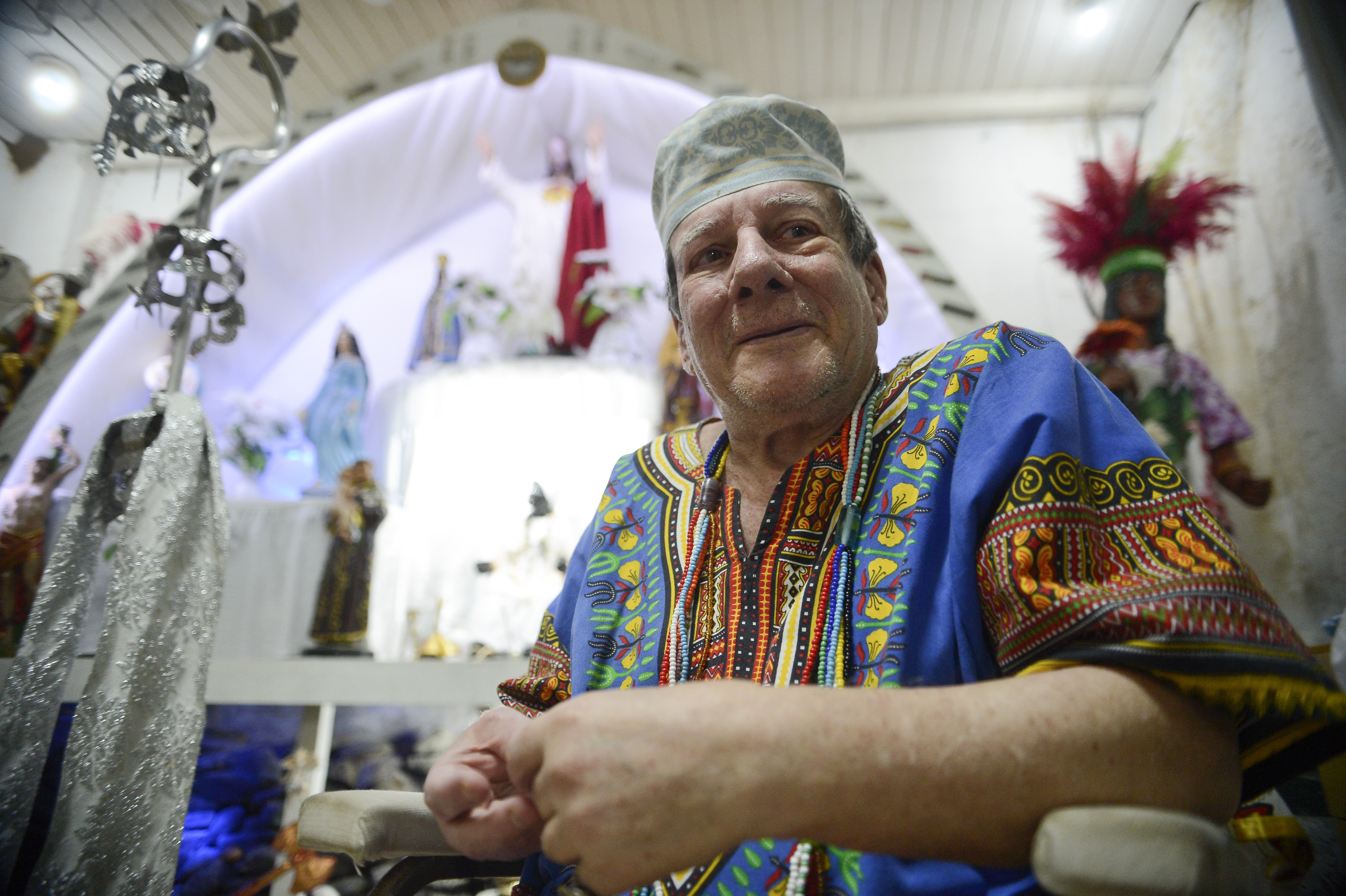
It is possible to see Christian and African elements and a white priest inside a temple in Umbanda.

Many Afro-Brazilian religions are called Macumba, but generally macumba is a vague word for any religion from Africa. Tambor de Mina is a highly syncretic religious tradition, combining cultural elements of colonial Brazil and Portuguese culture with elements of the religious culture of the first Brazilian African slaves. Candomblé is an Afro-Brazilian religion that mixes African beliefs with Catholic art and visuals. Many criticize that candomble is considered a syncretic religion, arguing that slaves needed to adopt Catholic elements so as not to be reprimanded by slave owners.

Santo Daime, is a religion founded by Raimundo Irineu Serra known as Mestre Irineu, Raimundo was a Catholic who served as a soldier in the Brazilian Amazon, during that period he had contact with indigenous cults involving the sacred ayahuasca plant, used by the natives of the Brazilian Amazon. Santo Daime is a religion that mixes Marianism with native Brazilian beliefs. Daime is an abbreviation of the Portuguese phrase 'give me love' (Dai-me Amor). The Santo Daime religion has managed to reach other countries, it is possible to consider that it is a world religion. Umbanda is a Kardecist Spiritism, Afro-Brazilian and Brazilian Shamanist religion, it emerged after a Kardecist medium Zélio Fernandino de Moraes came to accept the spirits of Natives and Blacks, Umbanda broke with traditional spiritism.

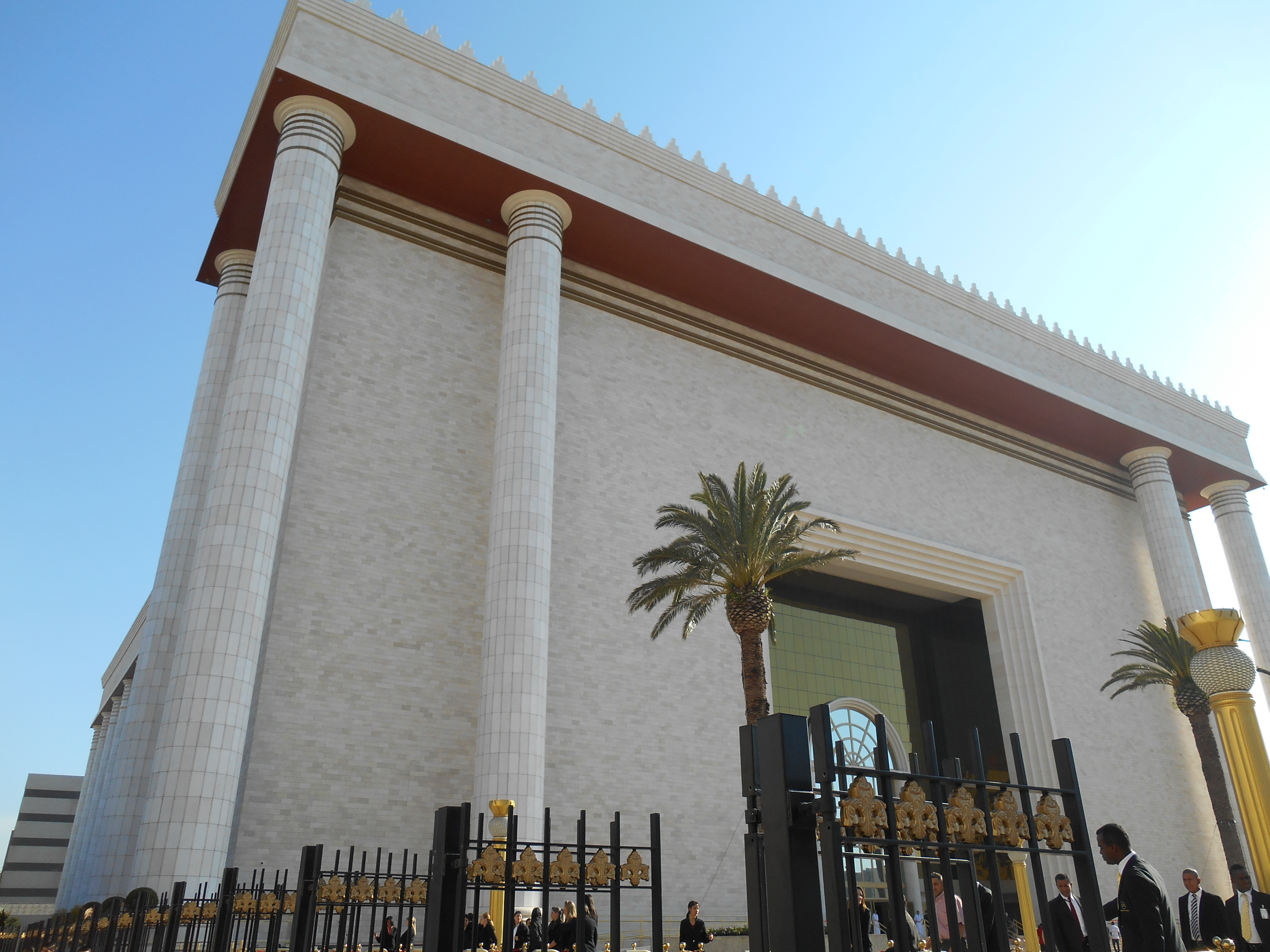
Brazilian Pentecostal church with Jewish elements.

Pentecostalism in Brazil has ritualistic characteristics of Afro-Brazilian religions, it is also very popular among black Brazilians, although Pentecostals deny that there is a syncretism between criticism and Afro-Brazilian religions. One of the most popular Pentecostal churches in Brazil, the IURD (Igreja Universal do Reino de Deus), has an open relationship of syncretisms with Judaism. Brazilian Jewish authorities reject this syncretism.
