= Christianity in Korea =

The practice of Christianity is marginal in North Korea, but significant in South Korea, which has a population of 8.6 million Protestants, mostly Presbyterians, and 5.8 million Catholics. Christianity in the form of Catholicism was first introduced during the late Joseon Dynasty period by Confucian scholars who encountered it in China. In 1603, Yi Su-gwang, a Korean politician, returned from Beijing carrying several theological books written by Matteo Ricci, an Italian Jesuit missionary to China. He began disseminating the information in the books, introducing Christianity to Korea. In 1758, King Yeongjo of Joseon officially outlawed Catholicism as an "evil practice," declaring it heretical and strictly banned. Catholicism was reintroduced in 1785 by Yi Seung-hun, and French and Chinese Catholic priests were soon invited by the Korean Christians.

Joseon royalty saw the new religion as a subversive influence and persecuted its earliest followers in Korea, culminating in the Catholic Persecution of 1866, in which 8,000 Catholics across the country were killed, including nine French missionary priests. Later in the 19th century, the opening of Korea to the outside world gradually brought more religious toleration toward Christians.

Sorae Church, which was the first Protestant church in Korea, was established by Seo Sang-ryun on 16 May 1883. Lee Soo-jung, one of the first Protestants in Korea, was baptized in Japan on 29 April 1883, and wrote an English article on the Missionary Review of the World to urge more American missionaries to enter Korea on 13 December 1883. Robert Samuel Maclay and Horace Newton Allen entered Korea one year later in 1884. Horace Allen was a North Presbyterian missionary who later became an American diplomat. He served in Korea until 1905, by which time he had been joined by many others. The Anglican Church of Korea can be traced back to 1890, when Charles Corfe, the first bishop of Joseon (Korea) landed in Korea; the first Anglican church in Korea Nae-dong Anglican Church was established in 1891 at Nae-dong, Jung-gu, Incheon.

The growth of Christian denominations was gradual before 1945. In that year, approximately 2% of the population was Christian. Rapid growth ensued after the war, when Korea was freed from Japanese occupation by the Allies: by 1991, 18.4% of the population (8.0 million) was Protestant, and 6.7% (2.5 million) was Catholic. The Catholic Church has increased its membership by 70% in the ten years leading up to 2007. Meanwhile, Eastern Orthodoxy accounts for about 4,000 adherents in South Korea, or 0.005% of the total population. Numerous unorthodox sects, such as the Unification Church founded in 1954 by Sun Myung Moon, have also developed in Korea. As of 2024, 31% of the South Korean population is Christian.

The influence on education has been decisive, as Christian missionaries started 293 schools and 40 universities including three of the top five academic institutions. Christianity was associated with more widespread education and Western modernization. Catholicism and Protestantism are seen as the religion of the middle class, youth, intellectuals, and urbanites, and has been central to South Korea's pursuit of modernity and westernization after the end of World War II and the liberation of Korea. In the early 21st century, however, the growth of Protestantism has declined, perhaps due to scandals involving church leadership, fundamentalism, and conflict among various sects. Some analysts also attribute this to overly zealous missionary work.

== Cultural significance ==
Christianity has been a dynamic force in Korean life, and had a positive influence on other religions. Buddhists compete for loyalty and attention, and it inspired numerous smaller sects. They adopted many of the methods pioneered by the Protestants. The influence on higher education in Korea has been decisive, as Christians founded 293 schools and 40 universities, including 3 of the top 5 academic institutions.

Prior to the Korean War (1950–1953), two-thirds of Korean Christians lived in the North, but most later fled to the South. It is not known exactly how many Christians remain in North Korea today. There is uncertainty about the exact number in South Korea. By the end of the 1960s, there were an estimated half a million Catholics and one million Protestants in South Korea, but during the "Conversion Boom" period ending in the 1980s, the number of Catholics and Protestants increased faster in South Korea than in any other country. The 2005 South Korean census showed 29.2 percent of the population identifying as Christian, up from 26.3 percent ten years previously. Catholics tend to be better educated than most other religious groups in South Korea, in the sense that they have a high number of college graduates (50.4%) and post-graduate degrees (11.6%) per capita. The Presbyterian Church has the highest number of members of any Protestant denomination in South Korea, with close to 20,000 churches affiliated with the two largest Presbyterian denominations in the country. The Orthodox Christianity under the jurisdiction of the Ecumenical Patriarchate of Constantinople is a small minority religion in South Korea with about 4,000 official members in 2013.

South Korea provides the world's second-largest number of Christian missionaries, surpassed only by the United States. GMS, the missionary body of the "Hapdong" General Assembly of Presbyterian Church of Korea, is the single largest missionary organization in South Korea.

South Korean missionaries have been serving in 10/40 Window nations, which are more hostile to Westerners. In 2000, there were 10,646 South Korean Protestant missionaries in 156 countries, along with an undisclosed number of Catholic missionaries. According to a 2004 article, "South Korea dispatched more than 12,000 missionaries to over 160 countries in comparison to about 46,000 American and 6,000 British missionaries, according to missionary organizations in South Korea and the West". According to a 2007 article, "Korea has 16,000 missionaries working overseas, second only to the US". In 1980, South Korea sent 93 missionaries and by 2009, some 20,000 Korean missionaries.

== Growth of Christianity ==
Christian share of South Korea's population

=== Appeal in the North ===
Christianity, especially Catholicism and Protestantism, had a special appeal to Koreans in the North. Between 1440 and 1560, there were migrations to the northern provinces, which were designed to strengthen the border. This created a society of mixed backgrounds without an aristocracy and without long-standing religious institutions. However, it did have a strong and ambitious merchant class, as well as a strong military tradition. Local elites gained administrative positions and adopted Confucian literati lifestyles but were not easy to attain high-level positions. During Japanese colonial rule from 1910 to 1945, the North became the more industrial region of Korea. The area was highly receptive to Catholic and Protestant missionaries in the late 19th century, who brought Western knowledge, and established hospitals and Western-style medical care, schools, and a window to the wider world. The middle-class elites sent their sons to the Catholic or Protestant schools. In turn the sons became strong nationalists who considered the United States a rallying point in opposition to Japanese colonial imperialism. In a reversal of previous Southern dominance, the North produced many influential figures in Korean history. After 1945, North Korea's Soviet-influenced state policy of atheism as a major facet of Juche caused most Christians to flee to South Korea in pursuit of religious freedom.

=== Academic sympathy ===
Matteo Ricci's books, which he created to use Chinese ideograms and concepts to introduce Catholicism, provoked academic controversy when Yi Gwang-jeong brought them into Korea. Academics remained critical of the new thought for many years. Early in the 17th century, Yi Su-gwang, a court scholar, and Yu Mong-in, a cabinet minister, wrote highly critical commentaries on Ricci's works. During the next two centuries, academic criticism of Catholic beliefs continued, as it overturned Confucian veneration of elders and tradition. Some scholars, however, were more sympathetic to Catholicism. Members of the Silhak (실학; "practical learning") school believed in social structure based on merit rather than birth (see class discrimination), and were therefore often opposed by the mainstream academic establishment.

Silhak scholars perceived Catholicism as providing an ideological basis for their beliefs and were therefore attracted to what they saw as the egalitarian values of Catholicism. When Catholicism was finally established in Korea in the 18th century, there was already a substantial body of educated opinion sympathetic to it, which was crucial to the spread of the Catholic faith in the 1790s. An 1801 study indicated that 55% of all Catholics had family ties to the Silhak school.

=== Lay leadership ===
As a result of the influence of the Silhak school, Catholicism in Korea began as an indigenous lay movement rather than being largely organized by a foreign missionaries. The first Catholic prayer-house was founded in 1784 at Seoul by Yi Seung-hun, a diplomat who had been baptized in Beijing. In 1786, Yi proceeded to establish a hierarchy of lay-priests. Although the Vatican ruled in 1789 that the appointment of lay-priests violated Canon law, in Korea indigenous lay-workers rather than foreign prelates carried Catholicism to many. Since Christianity began as largely a grassroots effort in Korea, it spread more quickly through the population.

=== Hangul, literacy and education ===
Hangul, a phonemic Korean alphabet invented around 1446 by scholars in the court of Sejong the Great, was little used for several centuries because of the perceived cultural superiority of Classical Chinese (a position similar to that of Latin in Europe). However, the Catholic Church became the first Korean religious organization to officially adopt Hangul as its primary script. Bishop Siméon-François Berneux (1814–1866) mandated that all Catholic children be taught to read it. Christian literature printed for use in Korea, including that used by the network of schools established by Christian missionaries, mostly used the Korean language and the easily learned Hangul script. This combination of factors resulted in a rise in the overall literacy rate, and enabled Christian teachings to spread beyond the elite, who mostly used Chinese. As early as the 1780s, portions of the Gospels were published in Hangul; doctrinal books such as the "Jugyo Yoji" (주교요지) appeared in the 1790s and a Catholic hymnal was printed around 1800.

John Ross, a Scottish Presbyterian missionary based in Shenyang, completed his translation of the New Testament into Korean in 1887, and Protestant leaders began a mass distribution effort. In addition, they established numerous schools, the first modern educational institutions in Korea. The Methodist Paichai School for boys was founded in 1885, and the Methodist Ewha School for girls (later to become Ewha Womans University) followed in 1886. These, and similar schools established soon afterward, helped the expansion of Protestantism among the common people. Protestants surpassed Catholics as the largest Christian group in Korea. Female literacy rose sharply, since women had previously been excluded from the educational system.

=== Christianity under Japanese occupation, 1910–1945 ===
Christianity grew steadily, with the Catholic population reaching 147,000, and the Protestants 168,000 by the mid-1930s. The stronghold for both groups was the North. From 1910 to 1945 the Japanese occupied all of the country, taking over its rule under a treaty forced on Korea. The Japanese-controlled police made systematic efforts to minimize the influence of the missionaries; this reduced conversions during the years 1911–1919. The idealistic pronouncements of the U.S. President Woodrow Wilson about self-determination of nations contributed to the rapid growth of Korean nationalism in the 1920s, but disillusionment set in after the movement failed to achieve meaningful reform. In 1924, Protestants founded the Korean National Christian Council to coordinate activities and divided the country into regions assigned to specific Protestant denominations for oversight. Korean Protestants also founded overseas missions to Koreans in China.

By 1937, the Presbyterian Church of Korea was largely independent of financial support from the United States; in 1934 the Methodist Church became autonomous and elected a Korean bishop. The most active missionaries among the Catholics were the Maryknoll order, which opened the Maryknoll School of Nursing in Pusan in 1964; it is now the Catholic University of Pusan.

==== Ritual controversies ====
Ritual controversies also marked the colonial era. Drawing on newspapers including the Tonga ilbo, Presbyterian and Methodist mission archives, as well as contemporaneous press photographs, historian Hajin Jun states how Protestant churches forbade Confucian ancestral rites (jesa) and popularised Western‑style church weddings and Sabbath observance, practices that quickly became highly visible social markers of conversion. When a widely publicised suicide in 1920 was blamed on a Protestant convert’s refusal to perform jesa, the Tonga ilbo opened a months‑long “jesa" controversy” in which cultural nationalists accused missionaries of “maligning Koreans as primitive,” while pastors defended abstention from jesa on theological grounds. Reformers then drafted non‑sectarian alternatives, such as the Enlightenment Fraternity’s “society‑style” civic wedding (1922) and Ko Yŏng‑hwan’s “Korean national wedding” (1931), to prevent chapel ceremonies from becoming the default elite norm. These debates were waged in the press and framed ritual as a matter of national (and not merely religious) concern and helped pave the way for the Japanese Government‑General’s 1934 Guidelines on Ritual Practice, which standardised life‑cycle rites for all Koreans regardless of creed.

=== Korean nationalism ===
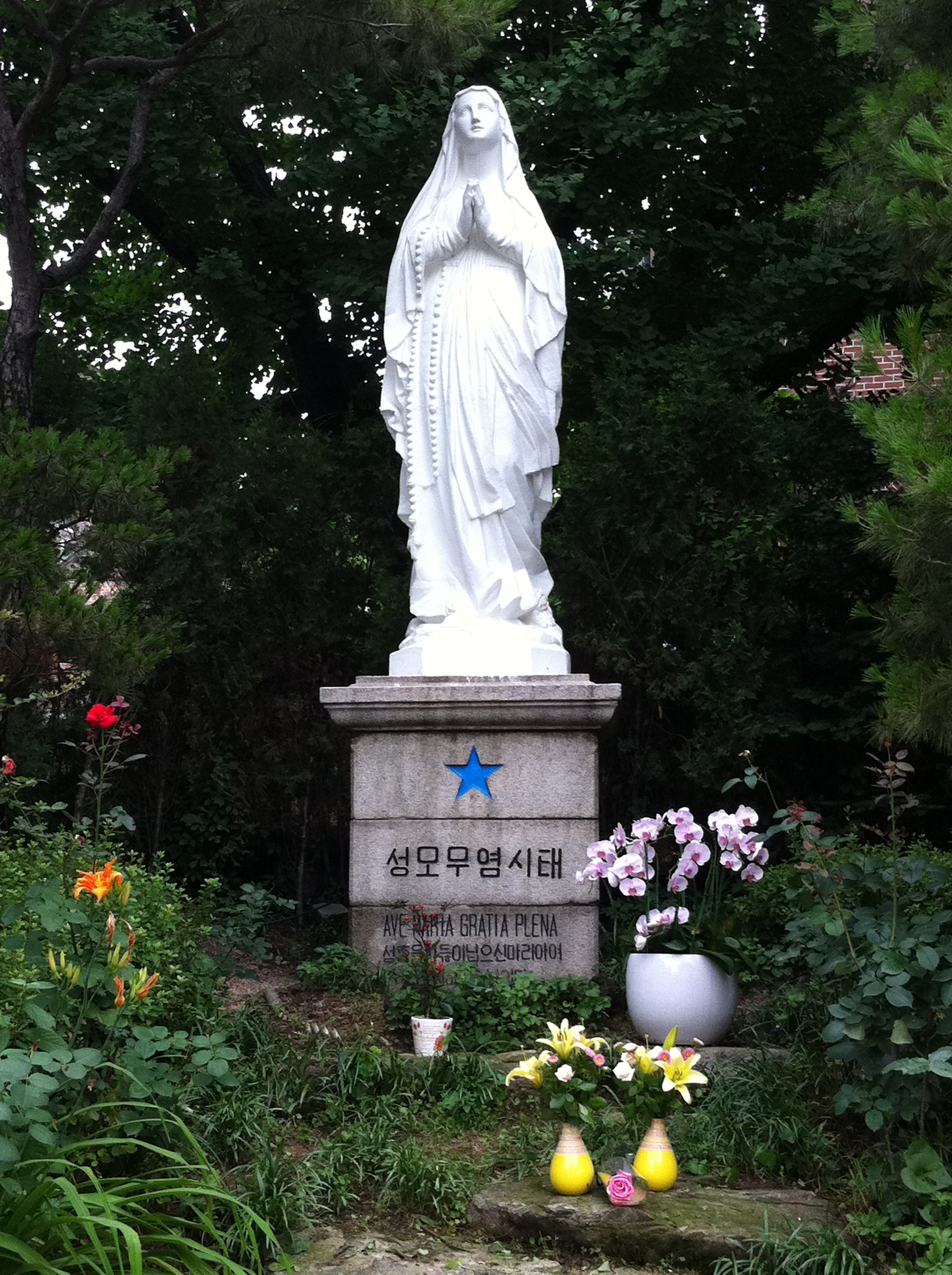
The Our Lady of the Immaculate Conception at the Myeongdong Cathedral

One of the most important factors leading to widespread acceptance of Christianity in Korea was the identification that many Christians forged with the cause of Korean nationalism during the Japanese occupation (1910–1945). During this period, Japan undertook a systematic campaign of cultural assimilation. There was an emphasis on Showa, so the Koreans would revere the Japanese emperor. In 1938, Japan prohibited the use of the Korean language in government, schools and businesses and even at home. The distinctly Korean nature of the church was reinforced during those years by the allegiance to the nation that was demonstrated by many Christians.

On 1 March 1919, an assembly of 33 religious and professional leaders, known as the "March 1 Movement", passed a Declaration of independence. Although organized by leaders of the Chondogyo religion, 15 of the 33 signatories were Protestants, including figures such as Gil Seon-ju. The Japanese imprisoned many in the movement. Also in 1919, the predominantly Catholic pro-independence movement called "Ulmindan" was founded. A China-based Korean government-in-exile was at one time led by Syngman Rhee, a Methodist.

Christianity was linked even more with the patriotic cause when some Christians refused to participate in worship of the Japanese Emperor, which was required by law in the 1930s. Although this refusal was motivated by theological rather than political convictions, the consequent imprisonment of many Christians strongly identified their faith, in the eyes of many Koreans, with the cause of Korean nationalism and resistance to the Japanese occupation. Especially the independence of Korea and the Korean War periods featured a further increase in Marian devotion among many Catholics that because Catholics thought the Blessed Virgin Mary who is patron saint of Korea helped Koreans against Japanese imperialism and communism. Both the date of Liberation Day in 1945 and the date of the establishment of the South Korean government in 1948 also overlap with the feast day of the Assumption of Mary.

=== Minjung theology ===
The Christian concept of individual worth has found expression in a lengthy struggle for human rights and democracy in Korea. In recent years, this struggle has taken the form of Minjung theology. Minjung theology is based on the "image of God" concept expressed in Genesis 1:26–27, but also incorporates the traditional Korean feeling of han, a word that has no exact English translation, but that denotes a sense of inconsolable pain and utter helplessness. Minjung theology depicts commoners in Korean history as the rightful masters of their own destiny. Two of the country's best known political leaders, Kim Young-sam, a Presbyterian, and Kim Dae-jung, a Roman Catholic, subscribe to Minjung theology. Both men spent decades opposing military governments in South Korea and were frequently imprisoned as a result, and both also served terms as President of the Republic after democracy was restored in 1988.

One manifestation of Minjung theology in the final years of the Park Chung Hee regime (1961–1979) was the rise of several Christian social missions, such as the Catholic Farmers Movement and the Protestant Urban Industrial Mission, which campaigned for better wages and working conditions for laborers. The military government imprisoned many of their leaders because it considered the movement a threat to social stability, and their struggle coincided with a period of unrest which culminated in the assassination of President Park on 26 October 1979.

=== Social change ===
Many Korean Christians believe that their values have had a positive effect on various social relationships. Traditional Korean society was hierarchically arranged according to Confucian principles. This structure was challenged by the Christian teaching that all human beings are created in the image of God and thus that every one of them is equal and has essential worth. According to Kim Han-sik, this concept also supported the idea of property being owned by individuals rather than by families.

Christians regarded the emperor as a mere man who was as much under God's authority as were his subjects, and Christian values favored the social emancipation of women and children. Christian parents were taught to regard their children as gifts from God, and were required to educate them. Youn Chul-ho insisted that Korean churches could transform the world through the serving and sacrifice of the church.

Most Korean Christians from philosophers, preachers, to laity incorporate the values of Confucianism into their lives, including "filial piety and loyalty" to family members.

=== Economic growth ===
South Korea's rapid economic growth in the 1960s and 1970s is usually credited to the policy of export-oriented industrialization led by Park Chung Hee to indigenous cultural values and work ethic, a strong alliance with the United States, and the infusion of foreign capital. Many South Korean Christians view their religion as a factor in the country's dramatic economic growth over the past three decades, believing that its success and prosperity are indications of God's blessing.

A 2003 study by economists Robert J. Barro and Rachel McCleary suggests that societies with high levels of belief in heaven and high levels of church attendance exhibit high rates of economic growth. Barro and McCleary's model has been influential in subsequent scholarship and, to some observers, it supports the belief that Christianity has played a major role in South Korea's economic success. The study has been criticised by scholars such as Durlauf, Kortellos and Tan (2006). There is a tendency to build megachurches since 2000, that leads some churches to financial debt.

=== World Mission and Evangelization ===
"In the 1960s the church reached out to people who were oppressed, such as prostitutes and new industrial laborers. As the Korean economy was burgeoning, the issue of the industrial labor force came to the fore as one of the most important areas of evangelization work. Churches established industrial chaplaincies among the workers within factories. In addition, with military service mandatory for men in South Korea, the part the chaplain's corps in the armed forces became equally important. Many soldiers converted to Christianity during their military service." Korea is now second only to the United States in terms of commissioned missionaries (30,000). The denomination with the highest number of missionaries is Presbyterian Church in Korea (Hapdong) with about 3,000 missionaries.

== Political and social issues ==
There have been various political and social criticisms in the Korean Christian scene since President Lee Myung-bak came into power. The South Korean government proposed to restrict South Korean citizens working for missionary works in the Middle East. Professor Son Bong-ho of Goshin University criticized the president for partaking in a national-level Christian prayers' gathering in March 2011 that signaled a potential danger of the strong Protestant influence in the secular South Korean politics. Increasing acts of hostility by Protestant Christians against Buddhism, have drawn strong criticism and backlash against Protestant churches by the South Korean public and has contributed in Protestantism's growing decline in Korea.

=== Seoul free lunch referendum ===
Former Mayor of Seoul, Oh Se-hoon, proposed a referendum on free school meals in Seoul on 24 August 2011. Pastors of multiple churches in Seoul were found to involve unlawfully with the lay people about the referendum and later being penalized by the Seoul Metropolitan election Commission (서울시선거관리위원회).

=== October 2011 by-election ===
A Christian group in Seoul had been indicted by the Seoul Metropolitan election Commission for sending politically motivated emails to the laypeople in order to vote for the conservative candidate, Na Kyung-won, before the 2011 South Korean by-elections.

=== Creationism ===
In South Korea, Protestant groups have been involved in the promotion of creationism, especially the Korea Association for Creation Research (KACR) which advocates creation following the Book of Genesis, and the Society for Textbook Revise (STR), an alternative translation Committee to Revise Evolution in Textbook (CREIT). CREIT is an independent offshoot of the KACR, and has distanced itself from the KACR doctrine. In early 2008, Seoul Land, a leading amusement park, hosted a "creation science" exhibit, organized by KACR, which was visited by over 116,000 visitors in three months, and as of 2012, the park was in talks to create a year-long exhibition.

In 2012, following pressure from STR, the Ministry of Education announced that many high-school textbooks would be revised to remove certain examples of evolution, such as of the horse and the dinosaur Archaeopteryx. The changes were limited to removal or revision of certain examples which were the subject of some debate; also, STR plans to submit further petitions to remove evolution of humans and the adaptation of finch beaks, with the end goal of diminishing the role of Darwinian evolution in teaching. This attempt was later denied by South Korean government in September of the same year.

=== Religious conflict ===
Fundamentalist Protestant antagonism against Buddhism has been a major issue for religious cooperation in South Korea, especially during the 1990s to late 2000s. Acts of vandalism against Buddhist amenities and "regular praying for the destruction of all Buddhist temples" have drawn criticism. Buddhist statues have been considered as idols, attacked and decapitated. Arrests are hard to enforce, as the perpetrators work by stealth at night. Such acts, which are supported by some Protestant leaders, have led to South Koreans having an increasingly negative outlook on Protestantism and being critical of church groups involved, with many Protestants leaving their churches in recent years.

However, a portion of South Korean Protestants continue to maintain friendly relations with other religious groups and encourage syncretism. Regarding Catholicism, relations between South Korean Catholics and Buddhists and other faiths has remained largely cooperative, partly due to the syncretism of many Buddhist and Confucian customs and philosophies into South Korean Catholicism, most notably the practice of jesa.

== Pope Francis' visit ==
Roman Catholic dioceses of Korea

Pope Francis accepted an invitation to visit South Korea in August 2014. The four-day visit (14–18 August) culminated with a Papal Mass at Myeongdong Cathedral, the seat of the Archdiocese of Seoul on 18 August. During a Mass on 16 August, the Pope beatified 124 Korean Catholic martyrs. An invitation for North Korea's Catholics to attend was declined, due to South Korea's refusal to withdraw from military exercises which it had planned with the United States.

== Notable Korean politicians ==
- Syngman Rhee – Protestant - Methodist; ROK President, 1948–1960
- Chang Myon – Roman Catholic; ROK Prime Minister, 1950–1952, 1960–1961; ROK Vice President, 1956–1960
- Yun Posun – Protestant - Presbyterian; Mayor of Seoul, 1948–1949; ROK President, 1960–1962
- Kim Young-Sam Protestant - Presbyterian; ROK President, 1993–1998
- Kim Dae-Jung Roman Catholic; Member of the ROK National Assembly, 1961, 1963–1972, 1988–1992; ROK President, 1998–2003
- Roh Moo-hyun nominally Roman Catholic; Member of the ROK National Assembly, 1988–1992, 1998–2000; ROK Minister of Oceans and Fisheries, 2000–2001; ROK President, 2003–2008
- Lee Myung-bak Protestant - Presbyterian; Member of the ROK National Assembly, 1992–1998; Mayor of Seoul, 2002–2006; ROK President, 2008–2013
- Moon Jae-in Roman Catholic; Member of the ROK National Assembly, 2012–2016; ROK President, 2017–2022
- Yoon Suk-yeol Roman Catholic; ROK President, 2022–2025
- Lee Jae-myung Protestant - Presbyterian; ROK President, 2025 - Incumbent

== See also ==
- Anglican Church of Korea
- Catholic Church in Korea
- Catholic Church in South Korea
- Evangelicalism#South Korea
- Korean Americans#Religion
- Lutheran Church in Korea
- National Council of Churches in Korea
- Korean Orthodox Church
- Presbyterianism in South Korea
- Religion in Korea
- Religion in North Korea
- Religion in South Korea
- Presbyterian Church in Korea (Tonghap)
- Presbyterian Church in Korea (HapDong)
- Presbyterian Church in Korea (Koshin)
- Presbyterian Church in the Republic of Korea
- The Church of Jesus Christ of Latter-day Saints in South Korea
