= Presbyterian Church of Korea =

Historical Christian denomination

The Presbyterian Church of Korea
- Classification: Protestant
- Orientation: Calvinist
- Polity: Presbyterian
- Region: Korea
- Origin: Early 1880s Hwanghae Province (Sorae Church) or Seoul (Saemoonan Church)
- Separations: Gosin (1952), Gijang (1953), Tonghap and Hapdong (1959)

Korean name
- Hangul: 대한예수교장로회
- Hanja: 大韓예수敎長老會
- RR: Daehan yesugyo jangnohoe
- MR: Taehan yesugyo changnohoe

The Presbyterian Church of Korea (PCK; Korean: 대한예수교장로회; Hanja: 大韓예수敎長老會), also known by the abbreviation "Yejang" (예장), is a Korean Calvinist Protestant denomination based in South Korea that adheres to the Westminster Confession of Faith.

Korean Presbyterianism originated in the early 1880s with the establishment of the Sorae Church by Seo Sang-ryun in 1884, following his conversion by Scottish Presbyterian missionaries.

As the Presbyterian mission expanded, the need for Korean pastors to serve congregations and provide theological education grew. In 1907, Presbyterians from the United States, Australia, and Canada established the first theological seminary in Korea, located in Pyongyang. In the same year, the Presbyterian Church of Korea organized its first presbytery and established a governing council.

Since the 1950s, the Presbyterian Church of Korea has undergone numerous schisms, resulting in multiple separate denominations such as the Presbyterian Church of Korea (TongHap) and the Presbyterian Church in Korea (HapDong), primarily over differences in ecclesiology and relations with ecumenical bodies. As of 2019, there were 286 branches in South Korea, with approximately four million church attendees. The numerous denominations that emerged from these schisms continue to incorporate "Presbyterian Church of Korea" in their official names.

== History ==
=== Early missionaries ===
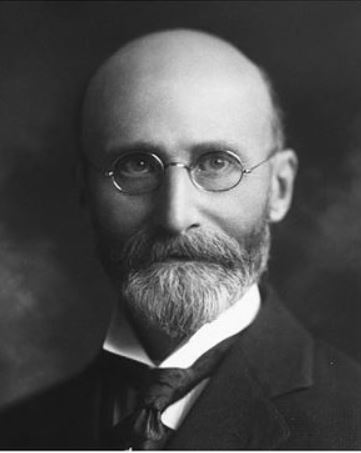
Horace Newton Allen

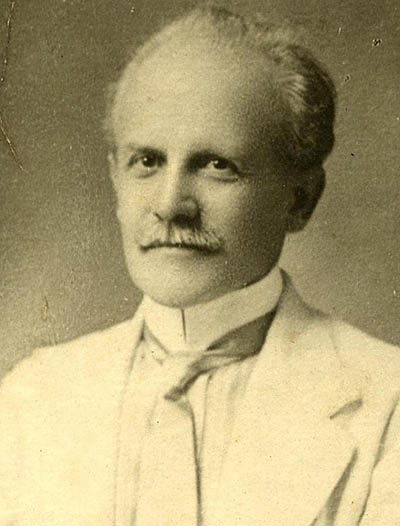
Horace Grant Underwood

Calvinism first arrived in Korea in August of 1866, when pastor Robert Jermain Thomas was captured and martyred during the General Sherman incident. The first Korean Presbyterian church was founded by Seo Sang-ryun in Hwanghae Province in 1884.

Large-scale missions began two decades later, when Horace Newton Allen of the Northern Presbyterian Church entered the royal court of Joseon as a physician. In 1885, Horace Underwood and John W. Heron arrived to establish a formal Presbyterian mission in Korea. Although the first Korean Bible was translated by John Ross in the 1870s, it was later printed by the British and Foreign Bible Society and the Scottish Bible Society in 1886.

Soon after, in 1889, missionaries James Scarth Gale and Joseph Henry Davies came from Canada and Australia, followed by Samuel Austin Moffett in 1890 from America. In 1891, teachers Isabella Menzies, Jean Perry, and Mary Fawcett arrived from Australia. Dr. James MacKenzie landed in 1893, and in 1898, Dr. Robert Grierson, pastor W. R. Foote, and Duncan MacRae of the Presbyterian Church in Canada joined the missionary effort.

McKenzie died a year and a half after his arrival while working in evangelism and medical care at Sorae Church, Hwanghae Province. His efforts led to the organization of the Korean mission church for the Presbyterian Church in Canada (캐나다장로회조선선교회) in Wonsan. Pastors William D. Reynolds and Lewis B. Tate arrived in 1892 and organized the Korean mission church for the Southern Presbyterian Church (남장로회조선선교회) in Jeolla Province.

In 1889, the Northern Presbyterian Church and the Presbyterian Church of Victoria created The United Council of Presbyterian Missions (장로교선교연합공의회; 長老敎宣敎聯合公議會), with John W. Heron as chairman, to settle issues over the unification of churches. In 1893, the United Council of Presbyterian Missions became the Council of Missions Holding the Presbyterian Form of Government (장로교선교공의회, also known as the Council of Missions). Both councils were made up entirely of foreign missionaries.

=== Birth of the PCK ===
Elections for the first Korean presbyters of the council began in 1900. Sŏ Kyŏng-cho (Hwanghae), Kim Chong-sŏp, and I Yŏng-ŭn (both South Pyongan) were elected as elders that year. (Note: I Yŏng-ŭn died before he was given an ordination) In 1901, Kil Sŏn-chu and Pang Kich'ang were also elected as elders. On September 20 of the same year, three Korean presbyters and six ministers, along with 25 missionaries, organized the Council of the Presbyterian Church of Korea (Chosun) (조선예수교장로회공의회; 朝鮮예수敎長老會公議會) at a missionary council held at the Saemoonan Church in Seoul. Missionary William L. Swallen was inaugurated as the first chairman. However, because the Council of Missions retained jurisdiction over church affairs, the Presbyterian Church of Korea initially functioned only as a fraternal organization. In 1902, Yang Chŏn-paek was appointed as an elder, and additional elders were elected in 1903.

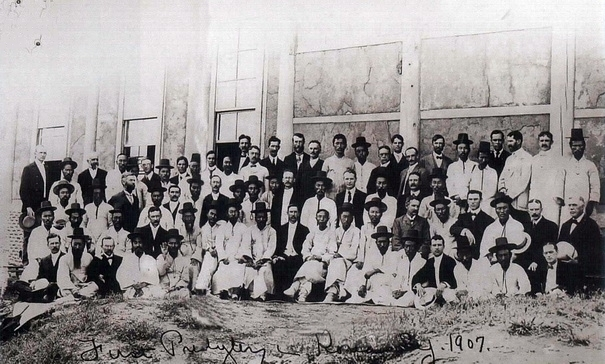
Organization of the Independent Council, September 17, 1907

In 1901, Samuel Moffett established the Pyongyang Theological Seminary and became its first principal. The spread of Presbyterianism was further intensified by the Great Pyongyang Revival of 1907. On June 20, 1907, Kil Sŏn-chu, Yang Chŏn-paek, Han Sŏk-chin, I Kip'ung, Sŏ Kyŏng-cho, Song In-sŏ, and Pang Kich'ang became the first graduates of the Pyongyang Theological Seminary. That same year, the United Council decided to appoint a party committee member to oversee church affairs for the five local councils of Pyeongan, Gyeongseong, Jeolla, Gyeongsang, and Hamgyeong.

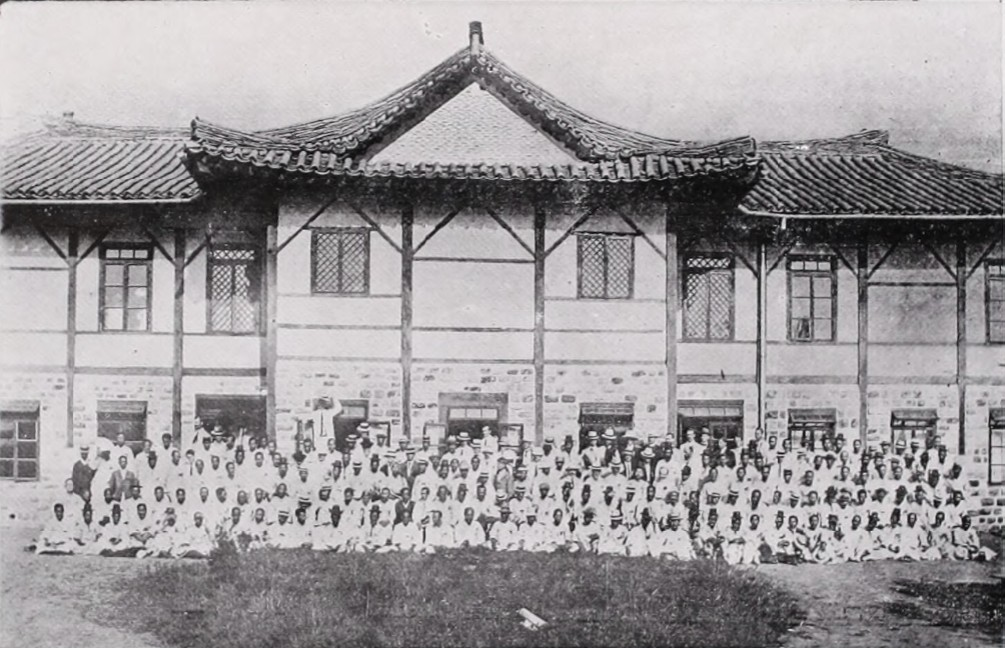
First General Assembly of the PCK, Pyongyang, September 1, 1912

On September 17, 1907, with the approval of four presbyters from the Mission Council, 33 missionaries and 38 presbyters organized the Presbyterian Church of Korea as an independent church. At the same time, the five local councils were reorganized into the seven sub-presbyteries (대리회; 代理會; Daeri-hoe) of Pyeongbuk, Pyeongnam, Hwanghae, Chungcheong, Jeolla, Hamgyong, and Gyeongsang. The PCK was also known during this era as the "Independent Council" (독노회; 獨老會; Dongnohoe). On September 17, 1911, during an assembly at Nammoon Church, Daegu, the Independent Council agreed to establish a General Assembly and convert the seven sub-presbyteries into official presbyteries. On September 1, 1912, the first General Assembly of the PCK took place in Pyongyang. In 1916, the Presbytery of Gyeongsang was divided into the presbyteries of Gyeongnam and Gyeongbuk, and the presbytery of Pyongseo (west Pyongan) was separated from the presbytery of Pyongbuk.

=== The colonial period ===
After the Japanese annexation of Korea in 1910, Korean Presbyterians were advised to remain uninvolved in any political cause. As a result, initial relationships between the colonial government and the Presbyterians were peaceful. Missionaries accepted Japanese rule as "the powers that be" and asserted a position of "loyal recognition" of the occupation. Nevertheless, many Korean Presbyterians were suspected by the colonial government of being political agents and were arrested, often without proper explanation or trial. In the 105-Man Incident, a group of Presbyterians was accused of plotting to assassinate then-Governor-General of Korea, Terauchi Masatake, in Sonchon. Missionaries were also charged with distributing firearms for the alleged assassination .

The Government-General of Chōsen actively pursued policies aimed at suppressing Christianity. A set of restrictions established in 1915 limited evangelist activities and placed sermons under police scrutiny. The same year, the colonial government further demanded that all schools in Korea discontinue all Bible studies courses within ten years. Tensions between Christians and the colonial government led many Korean Presbyterians, such as Kil Sŏn-chu, to become closely involved in the March First Movement of 1919.

The persecution of Christians intensified as a result of the movement. Police forces frequently destroyed Presbyterians' properties, and many missionaries were placed under scrutiny. By the end of June 1919, 1,461 Presbyterians had been arrested by Japanese police; within less than four months, the total number of Presbyterian arrests increased to 3,804. 41 of the Presbyterian leaders were killed, and twelve churches were destroyed. Horace Underwood made detailed accounts of the Jeam-ni Massacre during a trip to Suwon with his colleagues.

The March First Movement led to the resignation of Governor-General Hasegawa Yoshimichi on August 4, 1919, and the appointment of Saitō Makoto as his successor. Saitō accepted the Korean representatives' demands and agreed to alleviate restrictions on protests and the press. In September, a complaint documenting the requests of the church to the colonial government, which included an end to the ban on Bible study courses, was drafted among six missionary councils. The complaint was submitted to the Government-General, which accepted the requests.

By 1937, the Presbyterian churches were largely independent of financial support from the United States. Presbyterianism in Korea was reconstructed after World War II, and the General Assembly of the Presbyterian Church was re-established in 1947.

=== Schisms in the 1950s ===
In the 1950s, the Presbyterian Church of Korea suffered from a series of schisms over issues of theology, ecumenism, and worship.

In 1951, the first division occurred resulting in the Presbyterian Church in Korea (Kosin). due to a controversy that began in the 1930s, when Korea was still under Japanese rule. At that time, university students were instructed to bow to the Shinto shrine in worship, which was theologically and politically controversial among Christians. While many complied, some Christians at Pyongyang Theological Seminary adamantly opposed it, holding that the Bible prohibited such actions. After Korea's liberation from Japanese rule and subsequent division, many northern Koreans relocated to the south. Those who formerly opposed the Shinto shrine worship established a new seminary, Koryo Theological Seminary (now Kosin University) in 1946.

In 1953, the second division occurred, when progressives separated to form the Presbyterian Church of the Republic of Korea (KiJang). In the 1970s, the KiJang Presbyterians would produce some of the key leaders of minjung theology, a movement advocating social justice under the dictatorship of Park Chung Hee.

In 1959, at the 44th General Assembly, a third schism divided the Presbyterian Church of Korea into two equal branches: the Presbyterian Church of Korea (TongHap) and the Presbyterian Church in Korea (HapDong). The main issue was whether the Church should be a part of the ecumenical organization, the World Council of Churches (WCC). Park Hyun-nyon, President of the Presbyterian Seminary of the General Assembly, led the formation of the Evangelical "HapDong" (the union body), whereas those who supported relations with the WCC formed the ecumenical "TongHap" (the united body). Today, TongHap and HapDong represent the largest factions of Korean Presbyterianism.

== General assembly ==
General assembly	Date	Host	General Secretary	Note
1	1907		Samuel Austin Moffett	Dongnohoe
2	1908		James Scarth Gale	Dongnohoe
3	1909		Horace Grant Underwood	Dongnohoe
4	1910		James Scarth Gale	Dongnohoe
5	1911		W. D. Reynolds	Dongnohoe
1	September 1–4, 1912	Pyongyang Theological Seminary	Horace Grant Underwood	General assembly era
2	September 7–11, 1913	Soandong Church, Seoul	G. Engel	
3	September 6–9, 1914	Namsanhyeon Church, Chaeryong	Eugene Bell	
4	September 4–18, 1915	Seomunbak Church, Jeonju	Kim Pil-su	
5	September 2–6, 1916	Pyongyang Theological Seminary	Yang Jeon-baek	
6	September 1–6, 1917	Seungdong Church, Seoul	Han Seok-jin	
7	August 31–September 5, 1918	Sincheonbuk Church, Sinchon	Kim Seon-du	
8	October 4–9, 1919	Pyongyang Theological Seminary	Samuel Austin Moffett	
9	October 2–7, 1920	Andong Church, Seoul	Kim Ik-du	
10	September 10–15, 1921	Jangdaehyeon Church, Pyongyang	Lee Ki-pung	
11	September 10–15, 1922	Seungdong Church, Seoul	Kim Seong-taek	
12	September 8–13, 1923	Sinuiju Church	Ham Tae-yeong	
13	September 13–18, 1924	Sinchangni Church, Hamhung	Lee Ja-ik	
14	September 12–18, 1925	Seomunbak Church, Pyongyang	Im Taek-gwon	
15	September 11–17, 1926	Seomunbak Church, Pyongyang	Kim Seok-chan	
16	September 9–15, 1927	Gwangseok Church, Wonsan	Kim Yeong-hun	
17	September 7–13, 1928	Sinjeong Church, Daegu	Yeom Bong-nam	
18	September 6–12, 1929	Saemunan Church, Seoul	Cha Jae-myeong	
19	September 12–18, 1930	Seomunbak Church, Pyongyang	Hong Jong-pil	
20	September 11–17, 1931	Geumgangsan Church	Jang Gyu-myeong	
21	September 9–16, 1932	Changdong Church, Pyongyang	Namgung Hyeok	
22	September 8–15, 1933	Seoncheonnam Church, Sonchon	Jang Heung-beom	
23	September 7–14, 1934	Seomunbak Church, Pyongyang	Lee In-sik	
24	September 6–13, 1935	Seomunbak Church, Pyongyang	Jeong In-gwa	
25	September 11–19, 1936	Yangnim Church, Gwangju	Lee Seung-gil	
26	September 10–16, 1937	Daegu Jeil Church, Daegu	Lee Mun-ju	
27	September 9–15, 1938	Seomunbak Church, Pyongyang	Hong Taek-gi	
28	September 8–15, 1939	Sineuiju Jei Church, Sinuiju	Yun Ha-yeong	
29	September 6–13, 1940	Changdong Church, Pyongyang	Kwak Jin-geun	
30	November 21–26, 1941	Changdong Church, Pyongyang	Choi Ji-hwa	
31	October 16–20, 1942	Seomunbak Church, Pyongyang	Kim Eung-sun	1943–45: Discontinued due to World War II
32	June 11–14, 1946	Seungdong Church, Seoul	Bae Eun-hui	South Korea era
33	April 18–22, 1947	Daegu Jeil Church, Daegu	Lee Ja-ik	
34	April 20–23, 1948	Saemunan Church, Seoul	Lee Ja-ik	
35	April 19–23, 1949	Saemunan Church, Seoul	Choi Jae-hwa	
36	April 21–25, 1950	Daegu Jeil Church, Daegu		
36	May 25–29, 1951	Jungang Church, Busan	Kwon Yeon-ho	
37	April 29–May 2, 1952	Seomun Church, Daegu	Kim Jae-seok	
38	April 24–28, 1953	Seomun Church, Daegu	Myeong Sin-hong	
39	April 23–27, 1954	Jungang Church, Andong	Lee Won-yeong	
40	April 22–26, 1955	Yeongnak Church, Seoul	Han Gyeong-jik	
41	September 20–25, 1956	Saemunan Church, Seoul	Lee Dae-yeong	
42	September 19–24, 1957	Jungang Church, Busan	Jeon Pil-sun	
43	September 25–October 1, 1958	Yeongnak Church, Seoul	No Jin-hyeon	
44	September 24–29, 1959	Jungang Church, Daejeon		Schism

== Branches of the PCK ==
Church name	Founded	Number of congregations	Number of members	Notes
Conservative Presbyterian Church in Korea	1963	110	12,779	
Conservative Reformed Presbyterian Church in Korea	1980	126	7,687	
Fundamentalist Presbyterian General Assembly in Korea	1983	216	70,000	
Independent Reformed Church in Korea	1964	4	300	
Independent Reformed Presbyterian Church in Korea		8	600	
Korea Jesus Presbyterian Church	1975	135	21,712	
Korea Presbyterian Church	1984	425	345,000	
Korean Christian Fundamentalist Assembly	2014	116	18,262	
Korean Presbyterian Church (GaeHyuk I.)	1981	2,030	633,600	
Korean Presbyterian Church (HoHun)	1982	910	120,000	
Myungsung Presbyterian Church	1980	1	100,000	
Onnuri Community Church	1986		46,000	
Orthodox Presbyterian Church of Korea	2012			
Presbyterian Church in Korea (BaekSeok)	1982	1,700	611,000	
Presbyterian Church in Korea (BokUm)		122	27,000	
Presbyterian Church in Korea (BoSuHapDong II.)		408	101,400	
Presbyterian Church in Korea (BoSuHapDong)	1984	408	101,400	(Note: This one might be the same as the above.)
Presbyterian Church in Korea (BoSuJeongTong)		45	3,729	
Presbyterian Church in Korea (BoSuTongHap)	1976	102	6,000	
Presbyterian Church in Korea (BupTong)	1971	230	34,000	
Presbyterian Church in Korea (ChanYang)	1987	57	13,748	
Presbyterian Church in Korea (ChongHoe I)		64	3,511	
Presbyterian Church in Korea (ChongHoe II)		123	30,186	
Presbyterian Church in Korea (DaeHanShinChuk)		58	3,552	
Presbyterian Church in Korea (Daeshin)	1948	1,170	140,000	
Presbyterian Church in Korea (DaeShin II.)		125	15,200	
Presbyterian Church in Korea (DokNoHoe)	1954	87	15,000	
Presbyterian Church in Korea (DokNoHoe II)	1981	25	4,000	
Presbyterian Church in Korea (DongShin)	1972	56	5,264	
Presbyterian Church in Korea (GaeHyuk)		433	84,000	
Presbyterian Church in Korea (GaeHyukHapDong I)		179	24,000	
Presbyterian Church in Korea (GaeHyukHapDong II)		125	13,272	
Presbyterian Church in Korea (GaeHyukHapDong III)		23	4,065	
Presbyterian Church in Korea (HanGukBoSu)		132	6,900	
Presbyterian Church in Korea (HapDong)	1959	11,758	2,556,182	
Presbyterian Church in Korea (HapDongBokUm)	1984	272	35,000	
Presbyterian Church in Korea (HapDongBoSu I.)	1974	92	10,700	
Presbyterian Church in Korea (HapDongBoSu II.)		1,300	669,346	
Presbyterian Church in Korea (HapDongBoSu III.)		807	200,000	
Presbyterian Church in Korea (HapDongBoSu IV.)		127	30,122	
Presbyterian Church in Korea (HapDongBoSu)	1984	74	3,800	
Presbyterian Church in Korea (HapDongChinShin II.)	1993			
Presbyterian Church in Korea (HapDongChongHoe)				
Presbyterian Church in Korea (HapDongChongShin)	1985	100	11,765	
Presbyterian Church in Korea (HapDongChungYun)	1984	386	58,317	
Presbyterian Church in Korea (HapDongChunTong)	1979	1,700	611,000	
Presbyterian Church in Korea (HapDongEunChong)		67	2,392	
Presbyterian Church in Korea (HapDongGaeHyuk)		1,200	84,000	
Presbyterian Church in Korea (HapDongHwanWon)	1983	46	10,000	
Presbyterian Church in Korea (HapDongJangShin)		112	32,163	
Presbyterian Church in Korea (HapDongJeongShin)		186	112,275	
Presbyterian Church in Korea (HapDongJinRi)	1980	397	44,747	
Presbyterian Church in Korea (HapDongSeongHoe)	1987	78	10,013	
Presbyterian Church in Korea (HapDongTongHap)		133	22,932	
Presbyterian Church in Korea (HapDongYeChong I)		45	2,260	
Presbyterian Church in Korea (HapDongYeChong)	1988	65	32,178	
Presbyterian Church in Korea (HapDongYeSun)		31	2,814	
Presbyterian Church in Korea (HapDongYunHap)		400	85,841	
Presbyterian Church in Korea (HoHun II)		73	8,850	
Presbyterian Church in Korea (HoHun III)		310	51,481	
Presbyterian Church in Korea (HwanWon)		0	0	(Note: Defunct, merged into HapDongHwanWon)
Presbyterian Church in Korea (JaeGun)		113	23,600	
Presbyterian Church in Korea (JangShin)	1977	209	19,000	
Presbyterian Church in Korea (JapDongJungAng)		550	132,000	
Presbyterian Church in Korea (JeongRip)	1964	310	17,000	
Presbyterian Church in Korea (JeongTongChongHap)	1983	120	60,000	
Presbyterian Church in Korea (JeongTongGyeSeung)		56	1,200	
Presbyterian Church in Korea (JungAng)		355	60,500	
Presbyterian Church in Korea (JungRip)	1981	451	75,007	
Presbyterian Church in Korea (Ko-Ryu-Anti-Accusation)	1976	200	66,345	
Presbyterian Church in Korea (KoRyuPa)		500	80,000	
Presbyterian Church in Korea (Koshin)	1952	2,056	473,497	
Presbyterian Church in Korea (Logos)	1970	20	1,000	
Presbyterian Church in Korea (NamBuk)		213	310,000	
Presbyterian Church in Korea (PyeongAhn)		43	2,000	
Presbyterian Church in Korea (SungHapChuk)	1984	155	39,000	
Presbyterian Church in Korea (SunGyo)		10	1,000	
Presbyterian Church in Korea (TongHap)	1884	9,190	2,554,227	
Presbyterian Church in Korea (TongHapBoSu)		159	18,309	
Presbyterian Church in Korea (YeJangHapBo)	1980	300	187,500	
Presbyterian Church in Korea (YeJong)		50	5,000	
Presbyterian Church in Korea (YunShin)		88	6,469	
Presbyterian Church in the Republic of Korea	1960	998	335,000	
Pure Presbyterian Church in Korea	1956	25	12,775	
SaRang Community Church	1978		60,000	
Somang Presbyterian Church				
Union Presbyterian Church in Korea	1992	20	11,000	
United Presbyterian Church in Korea	1972	100	8,000	
Women Pastors Presbyterian Church in Korea	1984	103	15,407	
Young Nak Presbyterian Church	1945		10,000	

All of these churches have the same confessional basis, which are the Apostles' Creed and the Westminster Confession.

== See also ==
- Christianity in Korea
- Presbyterianism
- Presbyterianism in South Korea
- Christianity in Korea
- Christian revivals

== Bibliography ==
- Kang, Wi Jo (1984). "The Presbyterians and the Japanese in Korea". Journal of Presbyterian History. 62 (1): 35–50. JSTOR 23328501.
