= Presbyterian Church in Korea (HapDongJeongShin) =

Reformed denomination in South Korea

The Presbyterian Church in Korea (HapDongJeongShin) is a Reformed denomination in South Korea. It subscribes to the Apostles Creed and Westminster Confession. In 2004 the church had 112,275 members and 186 congregations.

In 1884, a Korean Christian, Seo Sang-ryun (who had been baptised in Manchuria, China by Scottish missionary John Ross) and his brother Seo Sang-u opened the first Korean Protestant church in Sorai, Hwanghae Province.

When the first Presbyterian missionaries from the US arrived in 1884, they found that the Seo and Ross had already translated the Bible in the Hangul language. Christian missionaries continued to arrive and founded many schools, hospitals and orphanages. The Presbyterian Pyongyang Theological Seminary was founded in 1901 and in 2023 is operating as the Presbyterian University and Theological Seminary (PUTS). The churches in Korea grew rapidly in the first half of the 20th century.

In 1953, in the aftermath of the Korean War, the church was officially divided into the Presbyterian Church in Korea and the Presbyterian Church in the Republic of Korea.

In 2023, the PCK is a member of the World Council of Churches, the World Communion of Reformed Churches and the Christian Conference of Asia. It also has working relationships with the Council of World Mission and the Evangelical Mission in Solidarity. In 2023, there are over 100 Presbyterian denominations across Korea and there are 799 missionaries of the Presbyterian Church of Korea are working in 77 countries.

- Presbyterian Church in the Republic of Korea
- Presbyterianism in South Korea
