= Presbyterianism in South Korea =

According to a 2021 Gallup Korea poll, 17% of South Koreans identify as Protestant; this is about 8.5 million people. About two-thirds of these are Presbyterians. Presbyterians in South Korea worship in over 100 different Presbyterian denominational churches which trace their history back to the United Presbyterian Assembly.

== History ==
The history of Christianity in Korea begins with the introduction of several theological works written by Matteo Ricci (an Italian Jesuit missionary to China) into Korea by Yi Su-gwang (a Korean politician, diplomat, and military official in the Joseon court) in 1603. Yi Su-gwang was not a convert; in fact, after introducing Ricci's works into Korea, he and Yu Mong-in (a member of the Joseon court's cabinet) wrote criticisms of these works in the context of neo-Confucianism, the official state philosophy of Joseon-era Korea. Christianity grew over time in Korea through indigenous prosletyzation, but its rejection of some traditional Korean cultural rites such as jesa led to government persecution, which saw it as a subversive influence; several persecutions of Korean Catholics culminated in the Catholic Persecution of 1866, in which some 8,000 Catholics and 9 French missionary priests were executed. One outcome of the martyrdom of Korean Catholics by their government is the canonization of 103 Korean saints and beatification of 124 others.

Protestant Christianity came later to Korea and followed after the persecutions of Catholics; it was introduced by predominantly American missionaries in the latter half of the 19th century, the majority of whom were of the Presbyterian and Methodist denominations. Protestantism was introduced to Korea in the late 19th century through missionaries. Lay people like Seo Sang-ryun and Baek Hong-Joon spread their knowledge of the Gospels after their conversion, and Christianity, of which the Catholic form had been suppressed in the middle of the 19th century, began to grow again in Korea.

Protestant missionaries in Korea

In 1883, Seo founded the first Protestant Christian community in Korea. The next year, the first American Protestant missionary and physician, Horace N. Allen of the Northern Presbyterians, arrived in Korea, and began medical work in 1885. Horace G. Underwood, a fellow Northern Presbyterian missionary, later joined this effort. His efforts were to "Christianize" the Koreans. Many people witnessed the extraordinary expansion of Protestant Christianity thanks to the early missionary method. Park (1992) states how the Nevius Plan and indirect missionary programs such as educational, medical, and social services. The indirect missionary method was effective because most Koreans in the beginning were apprehensive and hostile toward the Westerners to include missionaries. Through indirect programs, early missionaries slowly diminished the hostility and distrust of natives. The missionaries could communicate and sometimes convert Koreans. Clearly, the indirect missionary method worked well enough since small Protestant churches arose.

The Presbyterian Church of Victoria began mission work in 1889, followed in 1892 by the Southern Presbyterians, and in 1898 by the Presbyterian Church in Canada. Together they formed the Council of Mission of Presbyterian Churches and in 1901 opened the Pyongyang Theological Seminary in Pyongyang.

In 1907, the Independent Presbytery of Jesus Christ was formed, and seven Korean pastors were ordained. In 1921 the general assembly of the Presbyterian Church of Chosun was formed and sent seven missionaries to China.

During and even somewhat before the Japanese occupation, churches from practically all Christian denominations faced many hardships and were actively persecuted by the Japanese administration. The imposition of Shinto rites of worship further exacerbated religious persecution during the occupation. While Korea was under rule of Japan at the time, they decided to open up their “personal boundaries” to other countries, such as the United States, who were responsible for introducing Protestantism to Korea. During this era, Korea was mostly practicing Buddhism. Many Presbyterians were among those who resisted and fought for Korean independence. Following the conclusion the Second World War, the withdrawal of Japan, and the partitioning of Korea, Presbyterian churches in the communist-leaning northern parts of Korea were dissolved. In the Syngman Rhee-led parts of Korea south of the 38th Parallel they were reconstructed in 1946. The 33rd general assembly of the Presbyterian Church of Chosun was held in 1947. Two years later the name "Presbyterian Church in Korea" was adopted. Christianity expanded rapidly after the Korean War. People needed hope after such destruction and annihilation, many turned towards religion to keep hope alive.

== Korean Protestant churches ==
To be considered Protestant, Baker (2016) defines “those who confessed belief in a specific Protestant creed, and they were expected to meet regularly for worship services in a Protestant church”. Protestants gave more credit to women for institutional roles in the church, much farther than Catholics have. Also assigning women titles such as exhorter and deaconess. In 1989 there were nearly 30,000 Protestant churches. In the same time there were nearly one fourth of South Korea's 40 million people were Protestant Christian. No less than 25 percent of the population in South Korea is now Protestant Christian. Currently, Protestant churches are to be found in nearly all of the larger villages, also the towns and cities. Seoul is filled with so many church buildings and signs of the cross, that it has been called "a city of churches." In 2011, according to the Ministry of Culture, Sports and Tourism there were almost 78,000 Protestant churches in Korea. South Korea has the world's largest church congregation at the Yoido Full Gospel Church.

The following year saw significant growth for the Presbyterian church in Korea. Among the reasons contributing to the growth in size of Christian communities in Korea was that unlike in other countries, Christianity was not associated with colonial or imperialist power. The Protestant Christian message came to Korea at a time when the religious and cultural heritage of the country had lost much of its strength and relevance for the common people. In addition to being unencumbered by imperialist or colonial connotations, the Christian communities themselves contributed to their own growth. Presbyterian churches adopted what was called the "Möbius method" in which each new convert was strongly encouraged to become an evangelist and convert others, and much like the Möbius strip this practice is intended to make Christianity in Korea boundless. Together with the post-World War II revival movement, these factors contributed greatly to the immense growth of Christianity in Korea in the decades since.

Eventually, Korean Christians established their own churches not just in Korea but in other parts of the world; Korea is second only to the United States in the number of missionaries sent abroad. Several thousand Korean Presbyterian missionaries are active in many other countries.

Growth, however, was not free of turmoil, but accompanied by schisms. After World War II but before the end of the Korean War the Presbyterian Church in Korea (고신, Go-shin) and the Presbyterian Church in Korea (재건, Jae-gun) were formed. A few years later the conservative and progressive parts of the Presbyterian Church separated. As a result, in the last major Presbyterian schism, the Presbyterian Church in Korea (통합, Tong-hap) and the Presbyterian Church in Korea (합동, Hap-dong) were formed in 1959. From these bodies several denominations separated. Today there are more than 100 Presbyterian churches/denominations in South Korea. In the 21st century, a new General Assembly of the Orthodox Presbyterian Church of Korea (Founder. Ha Seung-moo) in 2012 declared itself an authentic historical succession of Scottish Presbyterian John Knox.

== Korean Protestant faith ==
The Korean Protestant belief in God or known as “Hananim”, meaning “God in heaven”. Their conception of the supreme God was that he presides over the affairs of heaven and earth, and controls the fate of humans. Contrary to Shamanism beliefs, which include but are not limited to seeking out a shaman for material wishes, longevity, health, male births and wealth -- Christians believe that God will supply their needs while they remain truthful, obedient and faithful to God. However, Korean Protestants were obligated to incorporate some aspects of shamanistic rituals.

Korean Presbyterians believe in a God who is also the creator and sustainer of the universe, with the power to liberate people from suffering, able to heal, and to provide salvation and consolation. Similarly to Korean Shamanism, shamans were thought to able to cast out evil spirits and cure diseases, just as Jesus Christ was supposed to be able to do.

== Confessional basis ==
- Westminster Confession of Faith
  - Westminster Larger Catechism
  - Westminster Shorter Catechism
- Apostles Creed

== See also ==
- Christianity in Korea
- Presbyterian Church of Korea
- Roman Catholicism in South Korea
