= Sooyoungro Presbyterian Church =

Church in Busan, South Korea

- Sooyoungro Presbyterian Church, Busan
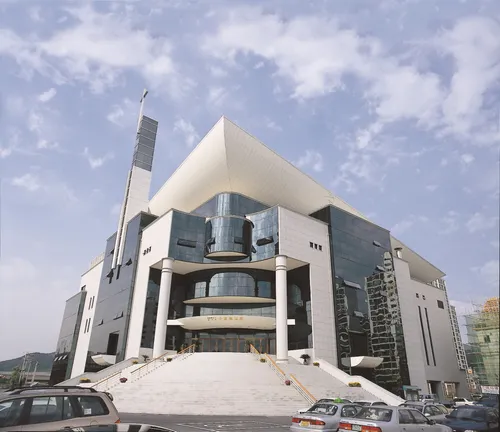
- Sooyoungro Presbyterian Church; Main Sanctuary (front).
- Sooyoungro Presbyterian Church
- 35.164601°N 129.139241°E
- Location: Busan
- Country: Republic of Korea
- Denomination: Presbyterian Church in Korea (HapDong)
- Previous denomination: Presbyterian Church of Korea
- Website: www.sooyoungro.org

History
- Founded: 1 June 1975

Korean name
- Hangul: 수영로교회
- Hanja: 水營路敎會
- RR: Suyeongno gyohoe
- MR: Suyŏngno kyohoe

Sooyoungro Presbyterian Church (Korean: 수영로교회) is a church in Busan, South Korea. It was founded on 1 June 1975 by Pil-do Jeong.

As of 2013, there are 62 pastors serving at Sooyoungro Church.

The main sanctuary on the second floor, Grace Hall, alone can accommodate 5,000 people, and when combined with the three other annex sanctuaries, the facility is large enough to accommodate 10,000 people at once.
