= Ryongyon County =

Ryongyon County 룡연군
- County

Korean transcription(s)
  - Hanja: 龍淵郡
  - McCune-Reischauer: Ryongyŏn-gun
  - Revised Romanization: Yongyeon-gun
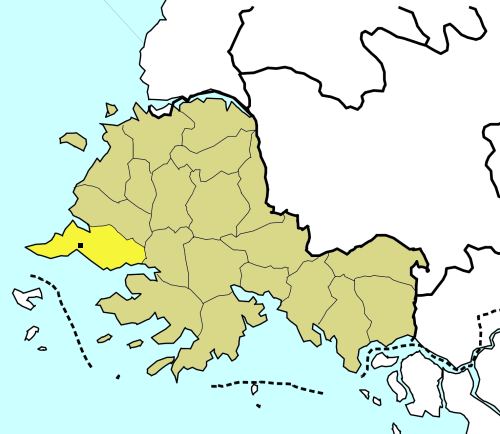
- Coordinates: 38°09′N 124°53′E
- Country: North Korea
- Province: South Hwanghae Province

Area
  - Total: 490.7 km^{2} (189.5 sq mi)

Population (2008)
  - Total: 90,102
  - Density: 183.6/km^{2} (475.6/sq mi)

Ryongyŏn County is a county in western South Hwanghae province, North Korea. Its Yellow Sea coast is known for its natural environment and as an important habitat for plants and birds. Ryongyŏn was the first place in which Protestant Christianity was established in Korea, in the late 19th century.

== Geography ==
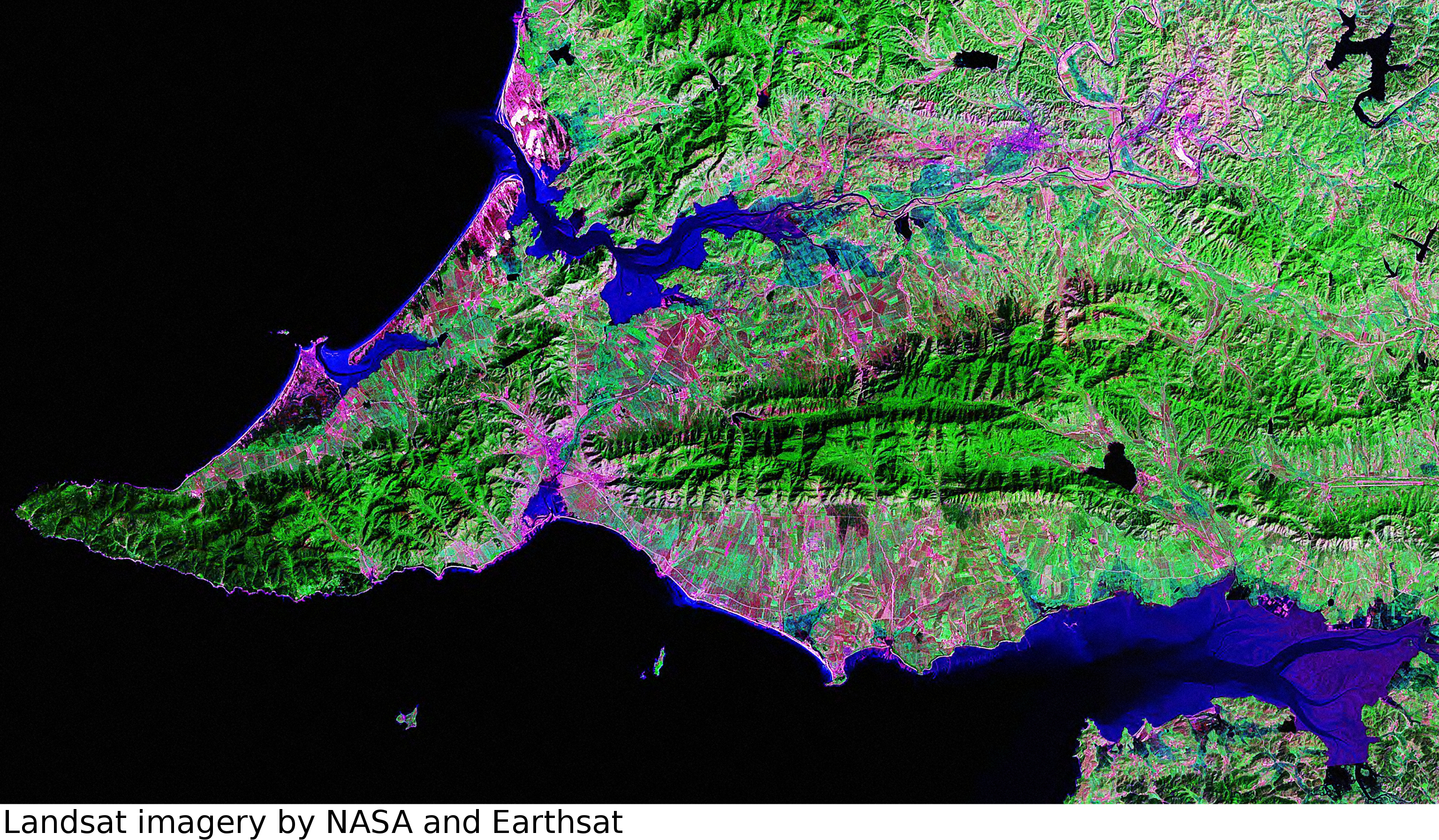
Ryongyŏn in NASA Landsat imagery

Ryongyŏn is a coastal county of 463 km^{2}, facing the Yellow Sea to the south and northwest. It also borders Changyon county to the northeast, and Taetan county to the east. Its territory includes several islands to the south: Wollaedo (Korean: 월내도), Ojakdo (오작도), and Yukdo (육도). Ryongyŏn is separated from the South Korean Baengnyeong Island by a strait 12 km wide, and can be clearly seen from South Korean resorts on clear days.

The Pult'a Mountains (불타산맥) run through the county from east to west. The western part of the chain projects into the Yellow Sea, forming the Ryongyŏn Peninsula, with Changsan Cape at its western end (장산곶). The territory is mainly mountainous, with beaches and some lowland to the north and south of the mountains. There are two main inlets or harbors: Monggŭmp'o (몽금포) in the north, and Kumip'o (구미포) in the south.

Two of North Korea's protected natural areas lie along the coastal strip. Changsan Cape contains a Protected Area covering 25.8 km^{2}, and another part of the cape has been established as a plant reserve. On the north side of the peninsula is Monggŭmp'o Sand Dune, a national monument of 0.1 km^{2}.

=== Climate ===
Climate data for Ryongyon (1991–2020)
Month	Jan	Feb	Mar	Apr	May	Jun	Jul	Aug	Sep	Oct	Nov	Dec	Year
Mean daily maximum °C (°F)	1.2 (34.2)	4.1 (39.4)	9.7 (49.5)	16.7 (62.1)	22.5 (72.5)	26.4 (79.5)	28.2 (82.8)	29.2 (84.6)	25.9 (78.6)	19.6 (67.3)	11.2 (52.2)	3.6 (38.5)	16.5 (61.7)
Daily mean °C (°F)	−3.7 (25.3)	−1.3 (29.7)	3.9 (39.0)	10.4 (50.7)	16.0 (60.8)	20.7 (69.3)	24.0 (75.2)	24.5 (76.1)	19.7 (67.5)	13.1 (55.6)	5.9 (42.6)	−1.1 (30.0)	11.0 (51.8)
Mean daily minimum °C (°F)	−8.4 (16.9)	−6.2 (20.8)	−1.3 (29.7)	4.4 (39.9)	10.2 (50.4)	15.9 (60.6)	20.6 (69.1)	20.5 (68.9)	14.2 (57.6)	6.9 (44.4)	0.9 (33.6)	−5.4 (22.3)	6.0 (42.8)
Average precipitation mm (inches)	9.4 (0.37)	14.5 (0.57)	18.7 (0.74)	44.1 (1.74)	74.7 (2.94)	81.3 (3.20)	205.7 (8.10)	182.3 (7.18)	81.7 (3.22)	32.5 (1.28)	37.6 (1.48)	18.1 (0.71)	800.6 (31.52)
Average precipitation days (≥ 0.1 mm)	4.4	3.4	3.3	4.7	5.7	6.3	9.7	8.6	5.0	4.2	6.5	7.0	68.8
Average snowy days	5.9	2.6	1.0	0.1	0.0	0.0	0.0	0.0	0.0	0.1	2.1	6.9	18.7
Average relative humidity (%)	72.4	69.5	67.1	66.6	71.6	78.2	86.0	84.5	78.9	74.3	75.0	74.9	74.9
Source: Korea Meteorological Administration

== Administrative divisions ==
The county is divided into one ŭp and twenty ri:

- Ryongyŏn-ŭp
- Changsal-li
- Hyangch'o-ri
- Kapy'ŏng-ri
- Kuhyŏl-li
- Kukch'ŏng-ri
- Kŭllong-ri
- Kumi-ri
- Kŭmsu-ri
- Monggŭmp'o-ri
- Namch'ang-ri
- Och'ajil-li
- Pongt'ae-ri
- P'yŏngch'ol-li
- Ryongho-ri
- Ryongjŏng-ri
- Sawŏl-li
- Sŏkkyo-ri
- Sŏnp'o-ri
- Sun'gye-ri
- Wŏnch'ol-li

== History ==
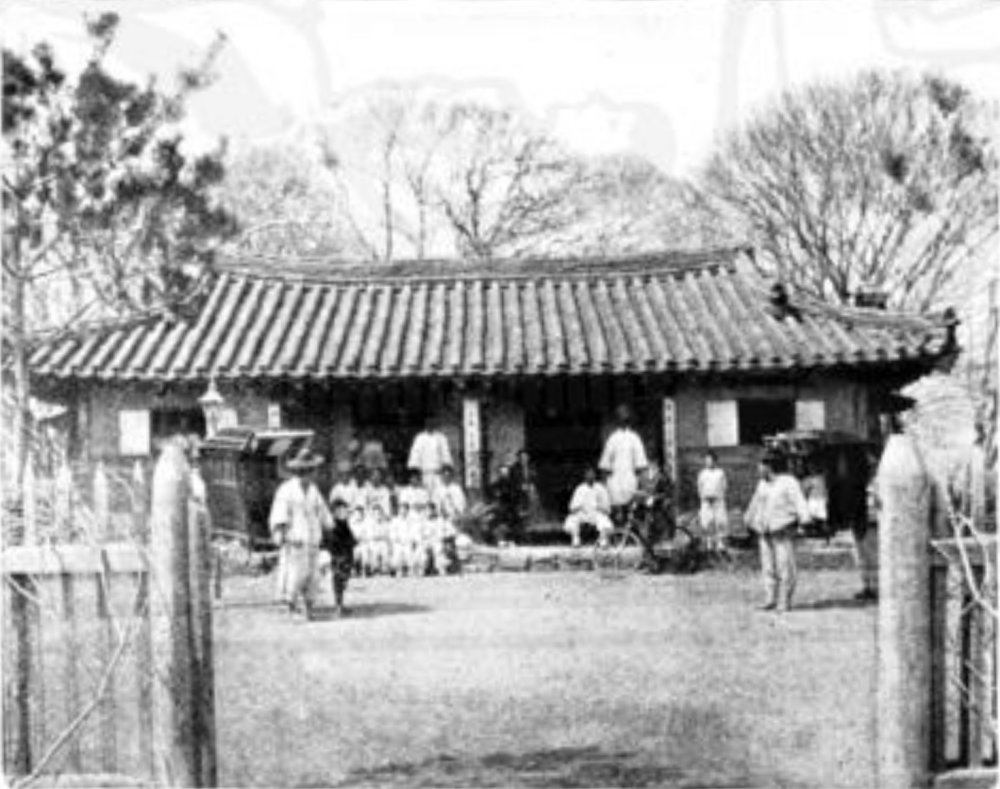
Church at Sorae, 1895 by Korean Christians

The first Protestant Christian church in Korea was founded at Sorae (Korean: 소래), on the southern coast of Ryongyŏn, in 1884 – before the beginning of foreign missionary activity in Korea. The church was founded by Suh Sang-Ryun (서상륜), who had been converted to Christianity while in Manchuria.

The church was visited and supported by English, Scottish, and American Presbyterian missionaries in the following years, including Horace Underwood. A permanent church building was constructed by the local Christians in 1895.

The territory of Ryongyŏn County lies just above the 38th parallel, and was included in the northern zone during the division of Korea. The nearby Ongjin Peninsula and Baengnyeong Island fell within the southern zone.

During the Korean War, the island Wollaedo was used as a base by pro-Southern partisans. This position was regularly bombarded by Northern artillery on the mainland of Cape Changsan. In 1952, a group of "White Tiger" partisans working together with United States Special Forces landed on the cape. They successfully took control of and destroyed the artillery site, escaping with small losses.

It has been reported by a former North Korean army officer that areas of the coast in Ryongyŏn are still defended by land mines.

The territory of Ryongyŏn County was previously part of Changyon County. In 1952, Changyon was split, and the new Ryongyŏn County was created.

== Economy ==
During the North Korean famine of the 1990s and 2000s, relief agencies have reported near-starvation conditions in Ryongyŏn. Western aid organizations have supported a Ryongyŏn Sustainable Food Security Programme to bring about "environmentally friendly community development at a group of four collective farms covering over 7,000 acres."

At an international conference on plans for a proposed Korea-China undersea tunnel, held in Seoul in 2008, Changsan was one of the locations considered for the terminus on the Korean side. Of the four suggested routes, the Ryongyŏn-Weihai line was the shortest, and the only one entering North rather than South Korea.

== See also ==
- Administrative divisions of North Korea
- Geography of North Korea
