= PCK =

PCK may stand for:

- Phua Chu Kang, a Singaporean sitcom
- Presbyterian Church of Korea
- Polish Red Cross (Polski Czerwony Krzyż)
