= Jerusalem of the East =

Jerusalem of the East as a nickname may refer to the following places:

- Pyongyang, North Korea
- Wenzhou, China

== See also ==
- Pyongyang Revival (1907)
