= Sonju =

Sonju is a name. Notable people with the name include:

- Jon Sonju (born 1975), American politician
- Kil Sŏnju (1869–1935), Korean Presbyterian minister
- Norm Sonju (born 1938), American basketball executive
