= Conservative Presbyterian Church in Korea =

- Classification: Protestant
- Orientation: Calvinist
- Polity: Presbyterian
- Region: Republic of Korea
- Origin: 1963
- Congregations: 110
- Members: 12,779

The Conservative Presbyterian Church in Korea was formed in 1963 when Pastor Kim Oh-Sung gathered 102 congregations to form a new denomination. Choi Sung-Gon became the moderator. Their conviction was that the neo-orthodox theology was the main reason of the division between the Presbyterian Church in Korea (TongHap) and the Presbyterian Church in Korea (HapDong). The conservative Calvinism was propagated in this new church. For 5–6 years the church was inactive. Graduates from SungHwa seminary—Cho Won-Kuk, Kim Duk-Sun, and Chung In-Young—met in 1972 and succeeded in restoring the denomination. When HapDong divided in 1979, many ministers and about 200 congregations joined non-mainline churches of HapDong. Only 22 stayed in BoSu. In 2004 it had 12,779 members and 110 congregations. It affirms the Westminster Confession and the Apostles Creed.
