= Somang Presbyterian Church =

Protestant church in Seoul, South Korea

- Hangul: 소망교회
- Hanja: 所望敎會
- Revised Romanization: Somang Gyohoe
- McCune–Reischauer: Somang Kyohoe

Somang Presbyterian Church(Korean: 소망교회) is a Presbyterian Church of Korea (PCK) church located in Gangnam-gu in Seoul, South Korea.

The church is located in the neighborhood of Sinsa-dong, Gangnam-gu. The church community was first established in Apgujeong-dong in 1977 and moved to its current location in 1981. It operates a welfare organization called Somang Welfare Foundation.

== Controversies related to Lee Myung-bak ==
The former South Korean President, Lee Myung-bak, also served as the elder of this church until December 2011. Some media outlets pointed out that some prominent figures of the Lee Myung-bak government attended the same church, and suggested that the church was one of the main source of his socio-political connections.

In 2011, The Hankyoreh reported that a producer of MBC's investigative journalist program PD Notebook, was replaced by another staff on early March 2011 after investigating the Somang Presbyterian Church. The staffs from MBC claimed that the president Lee Myung-bak was involved in this censorship-like action. A producer of an investigative journalist program from KBS was also later found out that was suddenly appointed to the International Department to stop any investigation towards the church.
