= Youngnam Theological University and Seminary =

University in Gyeongsan, South Korea

Coordinates: 35.8809°N 128.8180°E

- Hangul: 영남신학대학교
- Hanja: 嶺南神學大學校
- RR: Yeongnam sinhak daehakgyo
- MR: Yŏngnam sinhak taehakkyo

Youngnam Theological University and Seminary, also YTUS, is located in Gyeongsan City, North Gyeongsang province, South Korea, in an area inhabited by numerous other institutions of higher learning. It is officially a university, and is affiliated with the Presbyterian Church of Korea.

== History ==
The Bible school which would become YTUS was founded by James E. Adams, an American missionary, in 1913. After the end of the Korean War, a formal seminary was established on April 12, 1954. At that time it was called "Daegu Presbyterian Seminary" and was located in Daegu. The name changed to Youngnam Seminary in 1970, and the campus changed to its present location in 1987. In the same year, the seminary was accredited as a four-year college by the South Korean Ministry of Education. The school was reorganized as a university, and adopted its current lengthy name, in 1994. Two years later, the graduate school was established.

== See also ==
- List of colleges and universities in South Korea
- Education in South Korea
