= Presbyterian Church in Korea (Daeshin) =

- Hangul: 대한예수교장로회(대신)
- Hanja: 大韓예수敎長老會(大神)
- Revised Romanization: Daehan yesugyo jangnohoe Daesin
- McCune–Reischauer: Taehan yesugyo changnohoe Taesin

The church history dates back to 1948, the foundation of the DaeHan Seminary and with Rev. Kim Chi-sun, Pastor Kim Su-do, Rev. Yun Phil-sung started evening courses for the formation of the candidate of ministry. In 1960 the HapDong and TongHap split. Rev. Kim Chi-sun who belonged to hapDong founded the Bible Presbyterian Church in Korea. Soon tension arose between the Seminary and the Bible Presbyterian Church. In 1968 Kim withdrew from ICCC. Kim Chi-sun was running the Daeshin Seminary by himself. He tried to get his son appointed as director of the seminary. This idea was opposed by the professor of the Seminary, he was Choi Soon-jik who started with his follower the HapDongJinRi denomination, the leading figure was Huh Kwang-jae. In 1972 Kim Chi-sun and his son withdrew the denomination. The Daeshin group later revised its constitution. In 1974 the church adopted the "Declaration of the Church" and amended the new constitution in 1976. It joined the Council of Presbyterian Churches in Korea in 1980 and the World Alliance of Reformed Churches in 1992. Daeshin has experienced steady growth in recent years. It has 140,000 members in 1,170 congregations, 30 Presbyteries and a General Assembly. The church subscribes to the Apostles Creed and the Westminster Confession. Member of the World Communion of Reformed Churches.

== See also ==
- Anyang University
