= Women Pastors Presbyterian Church in Korea =

The Women Pastors Presbyterian Church in Korea was founded by women who had had difficulties in being ordained and recognised as pastors within their existing denomination, the Presbyterian Church in Korea (JungAng). They decided to create a Presbytery within JungAng, but later left to form their own General Assembly. A year later they opened a Theological Seminary. It subscribes the Apostles Creed and Westminster Confession. In 2004, there were 15,407 members in 103 congregations and 65 ordained ministers.
