= R. A. Hardie =

Canadian physician and evangelist

- Born: Robert Alexander Hardie; June 11, 1865; Haldimand County, Ontario, Canada
- Died: June 30, 1949 (aged 84); Lansing, Michigan, U.S.
- Education: Toronto School of Medicine, M.B., 1890
- Occupations: Missionary and physician
- Years active: 1890–1935
- Known for: Wŏnsan Revival Movement; Great Revival
- Spouse: Margaret "Matilda" Hardie (née Kelly) (m. 1886)

Robert Alexander Hardie (Korean: 하리영; RR: Ha Riyeong; June 11, 1865 – June 30, 1949) was a Canadian physician and Methodist evangelist who for 45 years served as a missionary in Korea. He is recognized as the catalyst for the Wŏnsan Revival (1903) and also inspired the Great Pyongyang Revival (1907) in what is now North Korea.

== Early life and education ==
Hardie was born on June 11, 1865, in Haldimand County, Ontario, south of Toronto. Of Scottish descent, he was the first of six children born to James and Abigail Hardie. Both his parents died before he was ten years old. Hardie was then raised by his aunt and uncle, Thomas and Fannie Shaw. He attended a school in Seneca, Haldimand County, earning a teacher's certificate in 1884, and worked as a teacher in Seneca for two years.

In 1886, Hardie enrolled at the Toronto School of Medicine. On December 27, 1886, he married Margaret "Matilda" Kelly of Hamilton, Ontario. As a medical student, he studied under Oliver R. Avison, who later travelled to Korea as an evangelist. Hardie graduated from University of Toronto with a Bachelor of Medicine degree in 1890.

== Career ==
=== Physician to missionary ===
In the summer of 1890, Hardie moved his family to Korea to serve as an independent and nondenominational medical missionary. The Toronto University Medical Student's YMCA (MS–YMCA) had funded his endeavour for the next eight years. For six months in late 1890 and early 1891, he served as a physician in the Chaejungwon (Extended Relief House: Royal Hospital) in Seoul. On April 14, 1891, he moved to Pusan and was later joined by his wife Margaret and two daughters at his residence which also served as the location of his medical practice. In 1892, the Hardies briefly moved to Nagasaki, Japan, on account of his poor health; they returned to Pusan later that year.

When Canadian missionary James Scarth Gale ended his association with his supporters from the University College's YMCA (UC–YMCA) in order join the American Presbyterian Mission, the UC–YMCA lost its only representative in Korea. At Hardie's suggestion, the MS–YMCA and UC–YMCA joined forces to form The Canadian Colleges' Mission (CCM) with Hardie as their representative and beneficiary in Korea. However, he faced competition from other missionaries in the Pusan area and financial hardship due to the limited support from Toronto. In November 1892, he decided to move his mission to Wŏnsan, where Gale and Malcolm C. Fenwick were then located. In Wŏnsan, Hardie began to emulate Fenwick's methods for self-sufficiency by supplementing his living with farming, "feeding cattle and growing fruit". The Hardie family stayed in Wŏnsan until 1896.

In July 1896, Hardie relocated his family to Canada, and returned alone to Wŏnsan in October 1897. In 1898, Gale moved to Seoul, and Hardie joined the American Methodist Episcopal Church, South, when his contract of support from the CCM ended. With the American Methodist mission, he was first tasked with establishing a medical practice in Songdo, Hwanghae Province, in present-day North Korea. He remained there for less than a year before relocating again to Seoul in August 1899. It was in Seoul, on November 11, 1900, that Bishop Alpheus Wilson ordained Hardie as a deacon in the Methodist Episcopal Church, South.

=== Revival movements ===
Sometime after 1900, Hardie stopped practicing medicine to concentrate on his missionary work. From 1902 to 1909, he was charged with the task of proselytising to the people of Wŏnsan and the greater Kangwon Province. In August 1903, at a Bible study with six other missionaries led by Moses Clark White who was visiting from China, Hardie spoke of prayer and the Holy Spirit. He read from Luke 11:13 and confessed about his low spirits and disappointment with his efforts to proselytise the Kangwon Province. During later meetings with larger congregations across northern Korea, he made similar confessions that inspired many western missionaries and native Koreans alike to confess their own sins, leading thousands of congregates to accept the missionaries' Christian teachings. From 1901 to 1909, there were almost 100,000 new Korean converts to the Christian faith.

Hardie's confessions became the catalyst for the Wŏnsan Revival which later inspired the Great Pyongyang Revival of 1907 in northern Korea. His expression of the feeling of "humiliation" at his failings in evangelizing people in the Kangwon Province had the paradoxical effect of inspiring a religious awakening that spread throughout the entire nation. Alfred Wasson, an American Methodist missionary to Korea, wrote in Church Growth in Korea (1934):

[The revival movement] spread until it became a conspicuous feature of the life of the entire Korean Church, and was widely commented on in distant parts of the world. The leader of the movement was the Reverend R. A. Hardie, MD.

=== Academic career ===
In 1905, Hardie started a mobile theological school named Sinhakdang (Hall of Theology). The school initially had no defined physical location as he travelled between Inch'ŏn, Kongju, Pyongyang, and Seoul to teach several months-long sessions. In 1909, he moved to Seoul and began teaching at the Pierson Memorial Bible School and the Methodist Biblical Institute. In 1913, he founded the Hyŏpsŏng sinhakkyo (Union Theological School) in Seoul. He served as the president of the school until 1922 and left the school in June 1923. From 1916, he also published a magazine entitled Sinak saekye (The World of Theology). In 1923, Hardie became the editor-in-chief of the Chosŏn Yesukyo Sŏhoe (now known as the Korean Christian Literature Society).

== Family and later years ==
When the Hardies arrived in Korea, they had with them a two-year-old daughter named Eva, their second child. Their first son Arthur Sidney had died as an infant in 1888. Their second daughter Annie Elizabeth was born in Seoul during the first year of their missionary life. The Hardies' third daughter Marie Mabel died only a day old but they had two more daughters, Gertrude Abigail and Sarah Grace, who lived to adulthood. Their seventh child Robert and youngest daughter Margaret Joy died at eleven and six years old, respectively. The Hardie family also adopted a Korean girl named Chuponia.

In 1935, Hardie retired from missionary work and moved with his wife to Lansing, Michigan, to live with their daughter Grace. In total, he had served as a medical and then an evangelical missionary for about 45 years of his life. Margaret died in 1945 and Robert on June 30, 1949.
