= Presbyterian Church of Korea (TongHap) =

Korean Christian denomination

The Presbyterian Church of Korea (Tonghap)
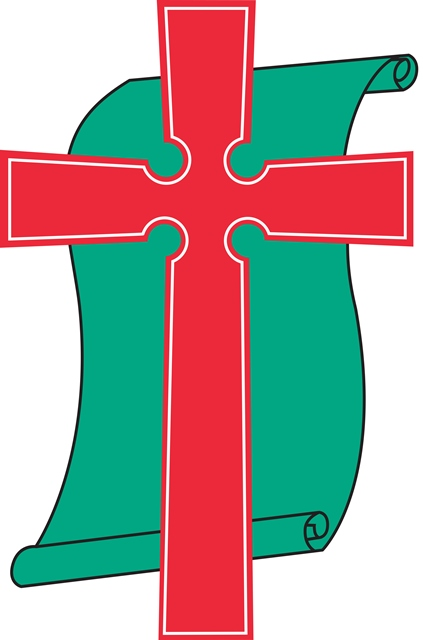
- Logo of the Presbyterian Church of Korea.
- Classification: Protestant
- Orientation: Presbyterian
- Theology: Reformed
- Polity: Presbyterian
- Moderator: Rev. Kwon We-young
- Associations: World Council of Churches, World Alliance of Reformed Churches, Council for World Mission, Christian Conference of Asia, National Council of Churches in Korea
- Region: South Korea
- Founder: Seo Sang-ryun
- Origin: 1884 when a church was founded in Hwanghae province.
- Separations: Gosin group Presbyterian Church of the Republic of Korea; Hapdong faction
- Congregations: 9,415
- Members: 2,140,910
- Ministers: 23,027
- Official website: http://www.pck.or.kr/ https://new.pck.or.kr/eng/(Eng)

- Presbyterian Church of Korea
- Hangul: 대한예수교장로회(통합)
- Hanja: 大韓예수敎長老會(統合)
- Revised Romanization: Daehan yesugyo jangnohoe (Tonghap)
- McCune–Reischauer: Taehan yesugyo changnohoe (T'onghap)

The Presbyterian Church of Korea, also known as Yejang Tonghap (Korean: 예장통합) or just Tonghap, is a mainline Protestant denomination based in South Korea; it currently has the 8th largest membership of all Presbyterian denomination in the world and largest in Korean Protestant denomination.

== History ==
In the 1950s, the Presbyterian Church of Korea suffered from a series of schisms over issues of theology, ecumenism, and worship.

In 1951, the first division occurred resulting in the Presbyterian Church in Korea (Kosin). due to a controversy that began in the 1930s, when Korea was still under Japanese rule. At that time, university students were instructed to bow to the Shinto shrine in worship, which was theologically and politically controversial among Christians. While many complied, some Christians at Pyongyang Theological Seminary adamantly opposed it, holding that the Bible prohibited such actions. After Korea's liberation from Japanese rule and subsequent division, many northern Koreans relocated to the south. Those who formerly opposed the Shinto shrine worship established a new seminary, Koryo Theological Seminary (now Kosin University) in 1946.

In 1953, the second division occurred, when progressives separated to form the Presbyterian Church of the Republic of Korea (KiJang). In the 1970s, the KiJang Presbyterians would produce some of the key leaders of minjung theology, a movement advocating social justice under the dictatorship of Park Chung Hee.

In 1959, at the 44th General Assembly, a third schism divided the Presbyterian Church of Korea into two equal branches: the Presbyterian Church of Korea (TongHap) and the Presbyterian Church in Korea (HapDong). The main issue was whether the Church should be a part of the ecumenical organization, the World Council of Churches (WCC). Park Hyun-nyon, President of the Presbyterian Seminary of the General Assembly, led the formation of the Evangelical "HapDong" (the union body), whereas those who supported relations with the WCC formed the ecumenical "TongHap" (the united body). Today, TongHap and HapDong represent the largest factions of Korean Presbyterianism.

== Organization ==
Today, the Tonghap Presbyterian denomination has about 2.14 million members in 9,415 congregations.

As an ecumenical denomination, it maintains relations with the World Council of Churches and is a member of the World Communion of Reformed Churches It has a daughter denomination in the United States, the Korean Presbyterian Church in America, which was later renamed in 2009 the Korean Presbyterian Church Abroad.

The denomination maintains seven colleges and theological seminaries to train its leaders:

1. Presbyterian University and Theological Seminary
2. Honam Theological University and Seminary
3. Hanil University and Presbyterian Theological Seminary
4. Youngnam Theological University and Seminary
5. Daejon Theological Seminary
6. Pusan Presbyterian Theological Seminary
7. Seoul Jangshin University and Theological Seminary

== Controversies ==
In September 2024, former constitutional chairpersons of the denomination's General Assembly sparked controversy by issuing a statement requesting the removal of Article 28, Section 6 of Part 2 of the Constitution, commonly known as the "Anti-Succession Law." Their main argument was that the law limits the autonomy of individual churches in appointing their pastors. However, at the 109th General Assembly, the motion to abolish the 'Anti-Hereditary Succession Law' was rejected, confirming that the majority of the delegates opposed the privatization of churches through succession.

The presbytery trial regarding the adultery allegations against Rev. Kim Ui-sik, the former moderator of the Presbyterian Church of Korea (PCK, Tonghap), was dismissed. Additionally, the General Assembly Court decided not to issue an indictment against him, sparking controversy.
