= Pure Presbyterian Church in Korea =

The origin of the Pure Presbyterian Church in Korea go back to the North. During the Japanese occupation five churches separated from NamHam Presbytery in HamKyungNamDo Province and kept their spirit of martyrdom. The leader was Pastor Lee Gye-Sil. During the Korean War Pastor Lee and hundreds of its follower fled to the South. After liberation they went their own way. They built a church and seminary in GuJae Island. In the same year they unite with Presbyterian Church in Korea (JaeGun), but the union was soon dissolved. and 6 JaeGun congregation stayed with SunJang. In 1956 they founded an independent seminary and the Dukchun Church. Pastor Lee become the president of the seminary. In 1979 it adopted the name SungJang. It subscribes the Apostles Creed and the Westminster Confession. In 2004 it had 12,775 members in 25 congregations and 9 Presbyteries of whom 3 outside Korea.
