= Kil Sŏnju =

Protestant Korean leader (1869–1935)

The Reverend Kil Sŏnju
- 길선주
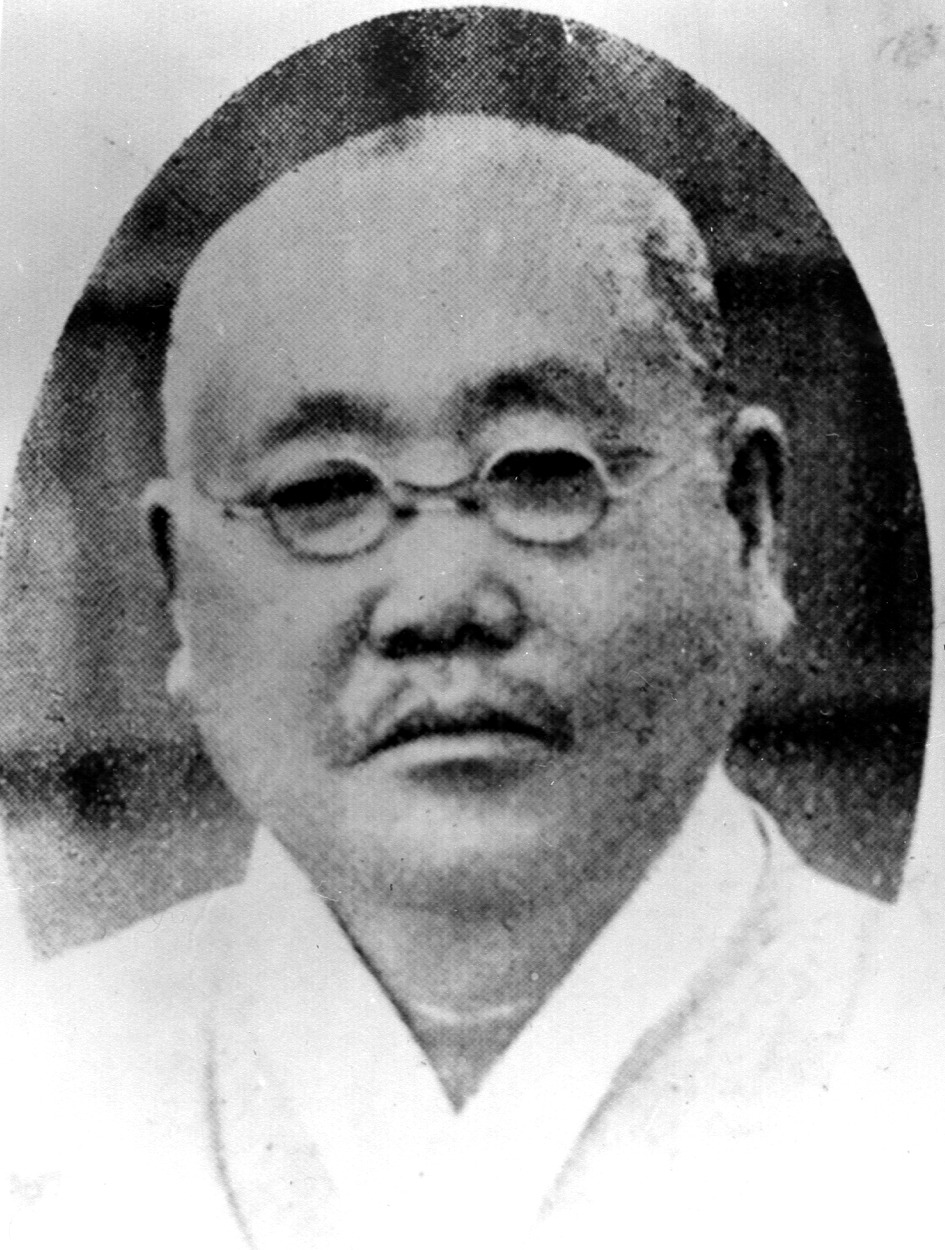
- Born: March 25, 1869
- Died: November 26, 1935 (aged 66)
- Education: Presbyterian Seminary in Pyongyang

Ecclesiastical career
- Church: Presbyterian Church of Korea

Korean name
- Hangul: 길선주
- Hanja: 吉善宙
- RR: Gil Seonju
- MR: Kil Sŏnju

Kil Sŏnju (Korean: 길선주; Hanja: 吉善宙; 25 March 1869 – 26 November 1935) was one of the first Koreans ordained as a Presbyterian minister. Considered by some to be the father of Korean Christianity, he was an early supporter of Korean nationalism, and shaped the nature of Korean Protestant Christianity.

== Biography ==
Kil Sŏnju converted to Christianity in 1897, after recognizing the dire state of Korea and claiming to have experienced a mysterious encounter with God during extended prayer. He was one of the first graduates of the Presbyterian Seminary in Pyongyang in 1907, and became the pastor of the Central Presbyterian Church of Pyongyang.

After graduating from seminary, Kil was involved in the Korean revival movement and would become one of the key figures of the Great Pyongyang revival of 1907. Bringing Korean folk religiosity into Christianity, Kil would also pioneer the spiritual practice of early morning prayers (Korean: 새벽기도; RR: saebyeok gido; MR: saebyŏk kido), which are characteristic expressions of Korean Christian spirituality.

Kil Sŏnju had a strong sense of Korean nationalism. He was involved with the March First Movement of 1919. After signing the Declaration of Independence, he was imprisoned under the Japanese occupation.

== 1907 Pyongyang Revival ==
As senior pastor of Jangdaehyun Church in Pyongyang, where the 1907 revival began, Kil's involvement was multifaceted, encompassing preaching, organizing, and advocacy. He was a gifted speaker, able to inspire audiences with his passionate and persuasive sermons. He was also closely involved in organizing the revival's activities, helping to coordinate prayer meetings, Bible studies, and other events that brought together large crowds of believers. On Sunday, January 6, 1907, foreign and Korean Christians gathered at Jangdaehyun for an evening revival service during which participants perceived the holy spirit to move throughout the congregation resulting in a chain reaction of public repentance, starting with Kil. This fervor spread throughout Pyongyang and the surrounding area. During this time, Korean Christians would devote a set period to evangelizing. At Jungdaehyun church, over 1,800 Christians offered 22,159 days of evangelism. This culminated in a campaign to evangelize "A Million Souls for Christ" in 1909 during which 100,000 days were offered for evangelism with the goal of .

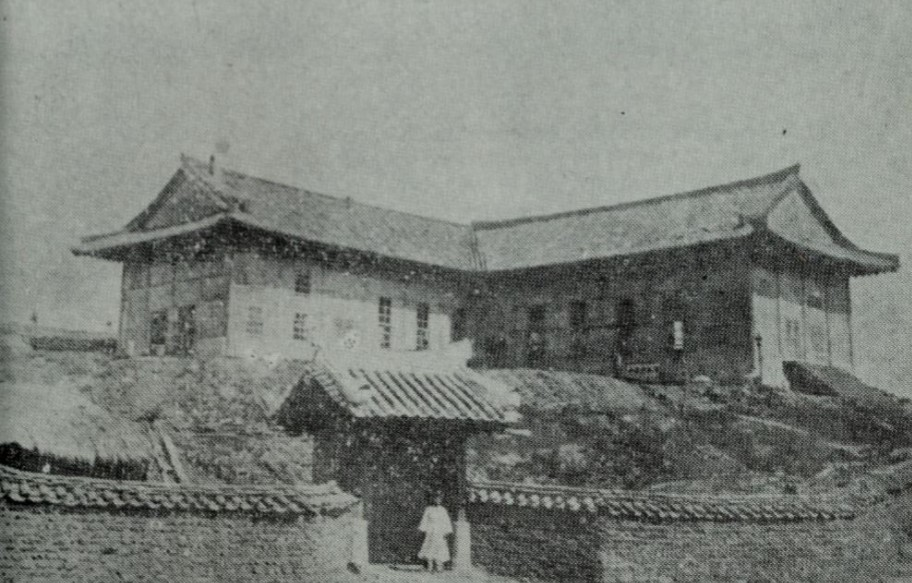
Jangdaehyun Church in Pyongyang, where the revival started

One of Kil's most significant contributions to the revival was his role in helping to establish the Young Men's Christian Association (YMCA) in Korea. The YMCA played a significant role in the Korean independence movement by providing a space for Koreans to gather, organize, and exchange ideas. The organization promoted education, social reform, and Christian values, which resonated with many Koreans who were looking for ways to challenge Japanese colonial rule and assert their national identity. Through his work with the YMCA, Kil helped to create a network of Christian leaders who would play a key role in shaping the future of Korea.

Kil's involvement in the revival helped to establish a strong and vibrant Christian community that has continued to thrive in the decades since. During his life, he delivered over 17,000 sermons witnessed by over 400,000 people. As Sebastian Kim notes, the revival "laid the foundations for the growth and dynamism of Korean Protestantism". Through his leadership and activism, Kil Sŏnju played a pivotal role in shaping this legacy, leaving an indelible mark on Korean history and culture.

== March First Movement ==
Kil was also an advocate for social reform and justice, using the revival as a platform to promote greater equality, justice, and opportunity for Koreans. As a prominent leader and organizer during the March First Movement, he played a key role in the planning and execution of the protests. In his hometown, Pyongyang, Kil Sŏnju's recruited, organized and trained activists, providing them with political education and organizational skills. He worked to mobilize Koreans to participate in the protests, using his skills as a speaker and organizer to spread the message of the movement and advocate for nonviolent resistance and a peaceful transition to independence. Lee Ki-bark states, "The success of the movement depended heavily on the work of the student organizations, which were often guided by intellectuals and public figures" like Kil.

Kil Sŏnju also played a key role in the drafting and signing of the March 1st Declaration, which outlined the movement's goals and demands. This Declaration was read aloud at protests across the country and helped to solidify support for the movement. Kil continued his work by maintaining the momentum of the March First Movement after the initial protests had taken place. He helped coordinate ongoing protests and resistance efforts, and worked tirelessly to keep the movement alive in the face of repression by the Japanese colonial authorities. Kil was also involved in the establishment of the provisional government of Korea in Shanghai China on April 11, 1919, following the March First Movement to provide a platform for the independence movement to organize and coordinate resistance against Japan.

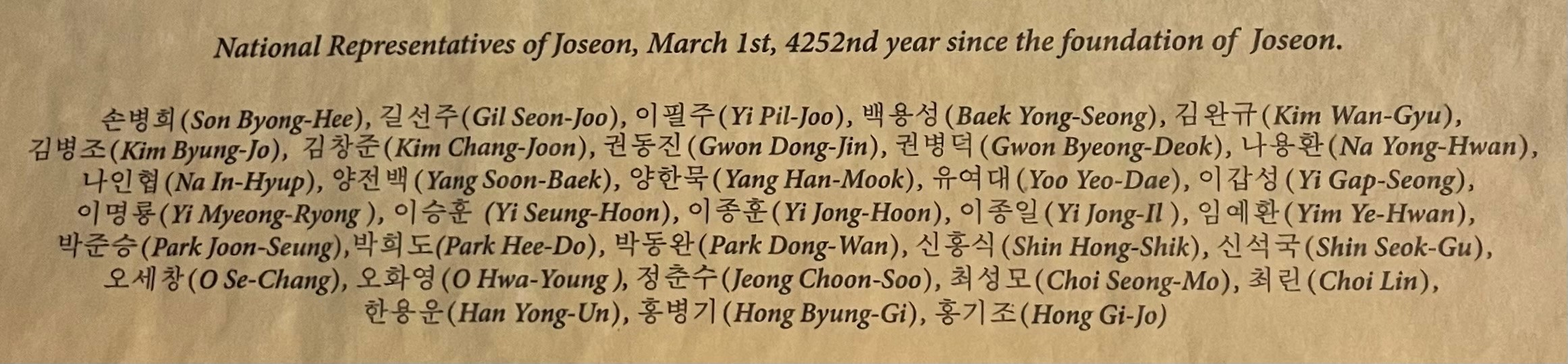
Kil Sŏnju listed as a signer of the Korean Declaration of Independence on May 1st, 1919

In his later life, Kil was arrested and spent two and a half years in prison for his commitment to independence. While in prison, Kil is said to have read the book of Revelation hundreds of times. Upon his return to Jungdaehyun church, he began preaching fervently about the second coming of Christ. Due to his increasingly conservative faith, Kil resigned as senior pastor of the church in 1926. Nearly blind, Kil continued his evangelism leading revival services and preaching about the second coming until his death.

== See also ==
- Christianity in Korea
