= Sorae Church =

First Protestant church in Korea

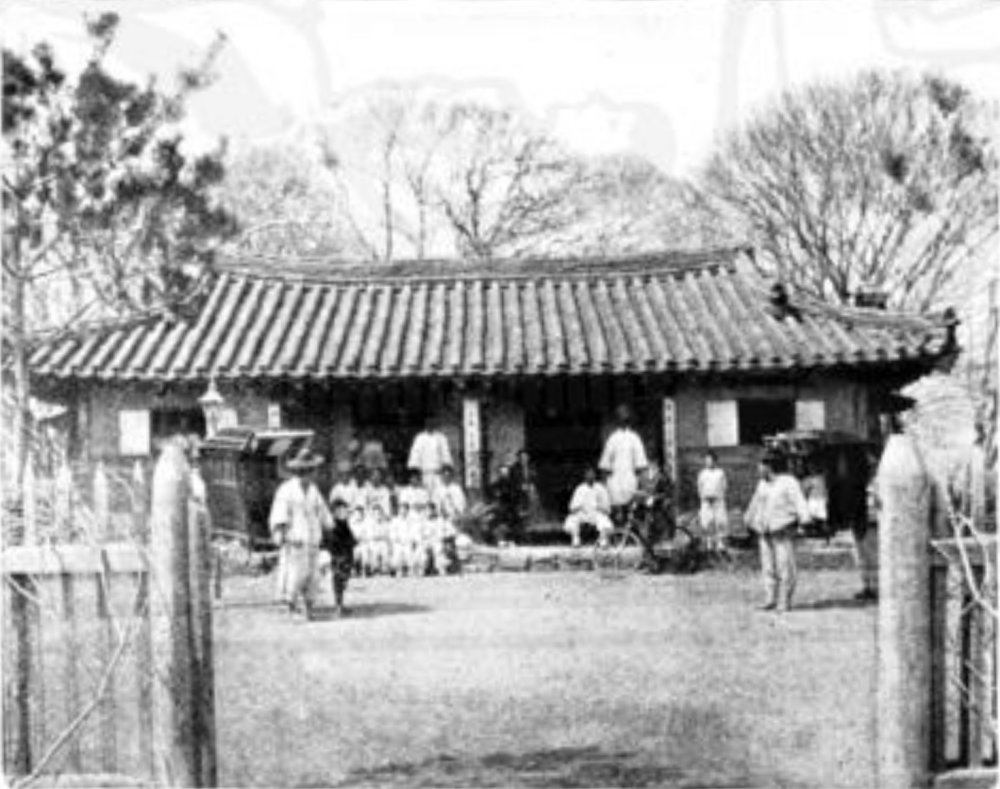
Sorae Church in 1895

Sorae Church or Solnae Church (Korean: 송천교회; Hanja: 松泉敎會) was established Songcheon (Korean: 송천) in 1883. It is considered the first Protestant church in Korea.

== Establishment ==
Seo Sang-ryun (서상륜) with his younger brother Gyeong-jo (경조) went to Manchuria in 1878 to peddle red ginseng, but he caught typhoid fever in Yingkou and he was in trouble no longer to peddle. At this time, with the help of Ross and Mcintire, he was hospitalized and treated for his illness, which led him to become a Christian. In 1883, he attempted to enter Korea with a Korean translated Bible, but was imprisoned by the Chinese government and soon escaped.

Seo Sang-ryun came to his hometown of Uiju (의주) in Korea for a while. He settled in Songcheon, Jangyeon-gun (장연군), Hwanghae-do (황해도) with his younger brother. He evangelized villagers there and a few months later he got 18 believers. They had held rallies every Sunday in secret locations since May 16. In general, it is presumed that the beginning of Sorae Church was in a shabby thatched house built in a mountainous corner.

On July 8, 1895, Sorae Church was built as 8 kans tile-roofed house, and in 1896, it was expanded to 16 kans and 32 pyeong.

== Legacy ==
The extended Sorae Church was restored in 1988 at Chongshin University Yangji Campus.
