= Youn Chul-ho =

South Korean theologian

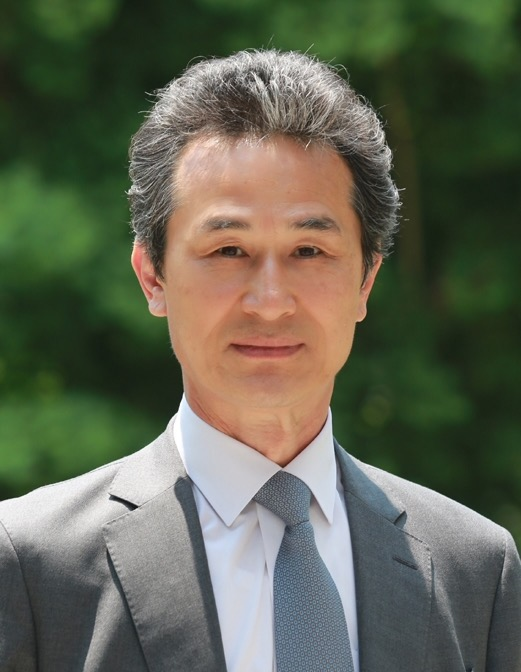
- Professor Youn in 2017
- Born: April 1, 1955 (age 71); South Korea
- Occupations: Professor, Academic and Theologian
- Title: Professor of the Systematic Theology
- Awards: the Ministry of Culture, Sports and Tourism(2008), The 31st Korean Christian Publishing Culture(2014)

Academic background
- Education: Th.B, Th.M., M.Div., Ph.D.
- Alma mater: Princeton Theological Seminary, Northwestern University
- Thesis: God's Relation to the World and Human Existence in the Theologies of Paul Tillich and John B. Cobb, Jr (1990)
- Doctoral advisor: James E. Will

Academic work
- Institutions: Presbyterian University and Theological Seminary in Seoul
- Website: https://www.fti.or.kr/

Youn Chul-ho (Korean: 윤철호; born 1 April 1955) is a Presbyterian theologian of South Korea. After teaching systematic theology and hermeneutics for 30 years at Presbyterian University and Theological Seminary, he has been an emeritus professor since June 2020. He has written books and articles of systematic theology. and has received several awards for his contribution to the development of theology of Korea.

== Life ==
Yoon Chul-ho was born in 1955 in Seoul as the youngest of ten siblings in a devout Christian family that had fled North Korea during the Korean War. His family's tragic separation and struggles deeply influenced his theology of reunification. Despite facing financial hardship, his mother's early death, and a severe back injury during military service, he remained steadfast in his faith. Viewing his hardships as divine refinement, he committed to becoming a pastor and enrolled in seminary.

== Education and influence ==
He entered Presbyterian University and Theological Seminary in 1980 and finished his M.Div. He received a Th.M. from Princeton Theological Seminary, and Ph.D. with the thesis "God's Relation to the World and Human Existence in the Theologies of Paul Tillich and John B. Cobb, Jr" (1990). He served as chairman of the Korean Systematic Theology Society, and established the Future Theology Institute in 2019, and is its director. His concern and study has been on the systematic theology and the dialogue between theology and science. He has contributed several articles to international journals and has published more than ten academic books. He insisted that Korean churches could transform the world through the serving and sacrifice of the church.

== Publications ==
=== Books ===
- Youn, Chul-ho (2020). Jerusalem and Athens: Theological Methodology. Seoul: Presbyterian University and Theological Seminary. ISBN 978-89-7369-463-1.
- Youn, Chul-ho (2000). Bible-Theology-Sermon: Systemic Theology Written in the Form of Sermon. Seoul: Presbyterian University and Theological Seminary. ISBN 89-7369-102-3.
- Youn, Chul-ho (2003). Modern Theology and Modern Reformation Theology. Seoul: Presbyterian University and Theological Seminary. ISBN 978-89-7369-133-3.
- Youn, Chul-ho (2004). Holistic Theology. Seoul: Presbyterian University and Theological Seminary. ISBN 89-7369-155-4.
- Youn, Chul-ho (2006). God in the Relationship with the World. Seoul: Presbyterian University and Theological Seminary. ISBN 89-398-0147-4.
- Youn, Chul-ho (2006). Theology and the Word. Seoul: Presbyterian University and Theological Seminary. ISBN 978-89-7369-213-2.
- Youn, Chul-ho (2011). The Triune God and the World. Seoul: Presbyterian University and Theological Seminary. ISBN 978-89-7369-278-1.
- Youn, Chul-ho (2011). The Glory and Shame of Sermon: The Theory and Practice of Sermon Criticism. Seoul: Presbyterian University and Theological Seminary. ISBN 978-89-7369-278-1.
- Youn, Chul-ho (2013). Who Do You Say I am: Holistic Doctrine of Jesus Christ. Seoul: Presbyterian University and Theological Seminary. ISBN 978-89-511-1654-4.
- Youn, Chul-ho (2017). Human Being: An Interdisciplinary Dialogue on the Nature and Destiny of Human Being. Seoul: holywavebooks. ISBN 979-11-6129-027-0.
- Youn, Chul-ho (2019). Public Theology for the Korean Church and the Kingdom of God. Seoul: holywavebooks. ISBN 979-11-6129-123-9.
- Youn, Chul-ho (2020). Discovery of the Gospel. Seoul: holywavebooks. ISBN 978-89-531-3724-0.
- Youn, Chul-ho (2020). Trust and Suspicion: Holistic Postmodern Christian Hermeneutics. Seoul: The Christian Literature Society of Korea. ISBN 978-89-511-0944-7.
- Youn, Chul-ho (2015). Introduction to Christian Theology. Seoul: The Christian Literature Society of Korea. ISBN 978-89-511-1798-5.

=== Translations ===
- Ricoeur, Paul (2016). Hermeneutics and Human Science. Cambridge: Cambridge University Press. ISBN 978-0-521-28002-0.
- Hodgson, Peter C (1999). Christian Theology. Seoul: Presbyterian University and Theological Seminary. ISBN 978-89-85467-38-4.
- Peters, Ted (2002). Science and Religion. Seoul: Dongyunbooks. ISBN 978-89-398-0125-7.
- McGrath, Alister E. (2016). A Brief History of Heaven. Seoul: ChristianHerold Press. ISBN 978-89-87118-12-3.
- Tracy, David (2007). Plurality and Ambiguity. Seoul: ChristianHerold Press. ISBN 978-89-87118-38-3.

=== International Professional Journal articles ===
- Youn, Chulho (2015). "Wolfhart Pannenberg's Eschatological Theology: In Memoriam". Neue Zeitschrift für Systematische Theologie und Religionsphilosophie. 57 (3): 398–417. doi:10.1515/nzsth-2015-0019.
- Youn, Chulho (2018). "Missio Dei Trinitatis and Missio Ecclesiae: A Public Theological Perspective". International Review of Mission. 107 (1): 225–239. doi:10.1111/irom.12219.
- Youn, Chulho (2020). "A Methodological Investigation on Christian Natural Theology". Neue Zeitschrift für Systematische Theologie und Religionsphilosophie. 62 (1): 41–57. doi:10.1515/nzsth-2020-0002. S2CID 212675651.
- Youn, Chulho (2020). "The Points and Tasks of Public Theology". International Journal of Public Theology. 11 (1): 64–87. doi:10.1163/15697320-12341472.

== Awards ==
- Excellent academic book by the Ministry of Culture, Sports and Tourism Award 2008
- The 31st Korean Christian Publishing Culture Award, Theology Division Grand Prize Award 2015
- The 23rd Korean Christian Publishing Culture Grand Prize in the Theology category Award 2006
- The 30th Korean Christian Publishing Culture Grand Prize Award, Theology Division 2013
- Korea Academy of Sciences Excellent Academic Books Award 2014

== See also ==
- John B. Cobb, Jr
- Paul Tillich
