= Presbyterian University and Theological Seminary =

Education organization in Seoul, South Korea

Coordinates: 37°32′59″N 127°06′14″E

- Motto: Pietatis et Scientia
- Motto in English: "Piety and Knowledge"
- Established: 1907
- Affiliations: Presbyterian Church of Korea
- President: Rev Dr Sung Bihn Yim
- Location: Seoul, South Korea
- Website: www.pcts.ac.kr/www/main/eng/_main/

The Presbyterian University and Theological Seminary (PUTS) is a university and seminary located in the Gwangjin District, Seoul, South Korea. PUTS is affiliated with the Presbyterian Church of Korea. Its school motto is Pietatis et Scientia ("Piety and Knowledge").

== History ==
It began as a small theological educational center, established by Samuel A. Moffett, an American PCUSA missionary. Teaching began at his home in 1901, before, in 1903, the Presbyterian Council formally agreed to the formation of a theological education center in Korea. In June 1907, the first class of seven students graduated from the theological course, and among them were the first Korean pastors ordained by the Presbyterian Church: Sun-Joo Kil, Suk-Jin Han, and Ki-Pung Lee.

In 1961, fifteen acres of land in Gwangjang-dong, Gwangjin-gu of Seoul was purchased, and new buildings were constructed on the site. A new school was launched, under the name of Presbyterian Seminary, gaining accreditation from the government of South Korea in the same year. Presbyterian Seminary opened its Graduate School in 1966. In 1973, the Seminary changed its name to Presbyterian Theological College, and established a joint Doctor of Ministry (D.Min.) program with San Francisco Theological Seminary. In the following year, the college received accreditation to open a Master of Divinity Program. With over 2,400 students, by the mid-1980s PUTS had become one of the largest Presbyterian seminaries in the world.

The year 1992 saw the School transfer its D.Min. program partnership to McCormick Theological Seminary. In 1993, Presbyterian Theological College changed its name to the Presbyterian University and Theological Seminary. The Graduate School of World Mission was established in the same year, quickly followed by the founding of the Graduate School of Ministry and the Graduate School of Education in 1995, and the Graduate School of Music in 1996. By 2001, the Graduate School of Ministry had broadened to offer Th.M. and D.Min. programs.

== Academics ==
The Presbyterian University and Theological Seminary is home to three different educational entities: the undergraduate college, the seminary, and the graduate school. Students of the college, seminary, and graduate school study a variety of different degrees.

PUTS is accredited by the Korean Council for University Education (KCUE). The institution is also a member institution of the Council for Christian Colleges and Universities (CCCU).

=== Affiliations ===
PUTS is affiliated with a number of different educational and research institutes. These include:

==== Affiliated educational institutes ====
- Women's Leadership Training Program
- PUTS Leadership Academy (for laypersons)
- PUTS Leadership Academy (for pastors)
- PUTS Language Education Institute

==== Affiliated research institutes ====
- Institute of Church and Society
- Institute for the Study of Church Music
- Institute of Church and Communication
- Christian Education Research Institute
- Institute for the Study of Christian Thought
- Institute of Counseling Ministry
- Institute of Biblical Studies
- Institute of Holy Land Studies
- Korean Institute of the Bible and Holy Land Studies in Jerusalem (KHLS)
- Center for World Mission
- Institute of History and Ecumenics
- Institute of Korean Church History

==== Student experience ====
PUTS is affiliated with the Presbyterian theologian and author Frederick Buechner. PUTS students are invited to submit an entry for the annual Excellence in Preaching and Excellence in Writing prizes named in honor of Buechner.

Due to its membership of the CCCU, students of PUTS are given the opportunity to apply for study abroad on the Best Semester program.

== See also ==
- Youn Chul-ho
- Ky-Chun So
