= Pyongyang Revival =

1907 Protestant revival in North Korea

Kil Sŏn-chu, a key figure in the revival

The Pyongyang Revival or the Great Pyongyang Revival of 1907 was a Protestant revival that occurred in and around the city of Pyongyang, which is today the capital of North Korea. A key figure of the movement is often seen to be Kil Sŏn-chu (or Gil Seon-ju), one of the first Korean Protestants ordained as a Presbyterian minister. R. A. Hardie, a Canadian physician and Methodist missionary who primarily worked in Wonsan, was also an inspiration for the movement.

== History ==
Prior to 1907, there were a series of local revivals in Korea. For instance, in 1903, due to famine in the center of the country, two local revivals were experienced in a Presbyterian church near Seoul and in a Methodist church in Wonsan. This would be followed by a series of revivals amongst Methodists (1904–1905) and Presbyterians (1906). Moreover, in the fall of 1906, Korean Christians began hearing reports about the Welsh revival (1904–1905) and Khasi Hills revival in India (1905–1906), and reportedly had "a great desire to have the same blessing."

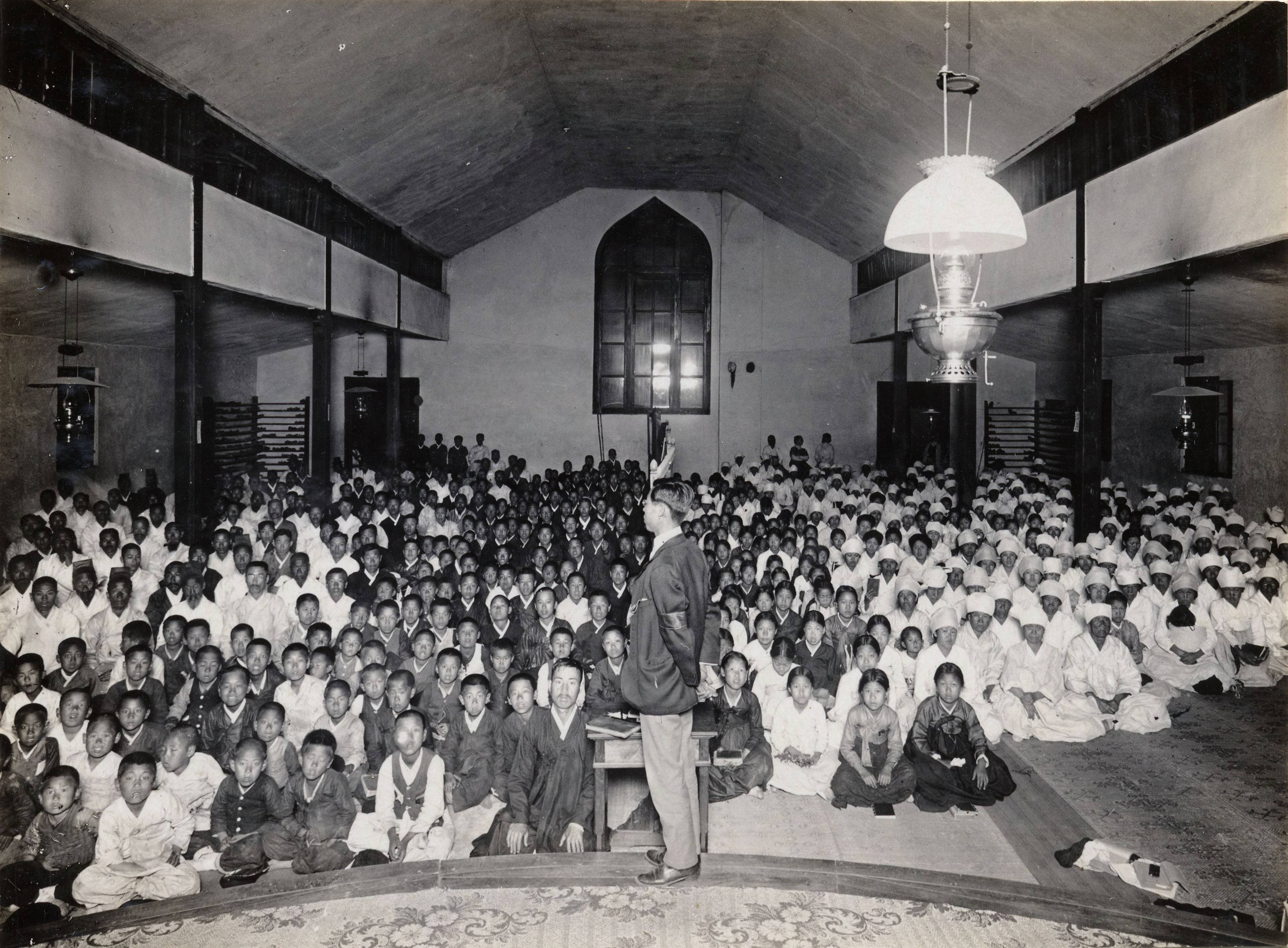
Prayer meeting in Pyongyang

In January 1907, across two weeks, the Presbyterian seminary in Pyongyang held a Bible conference of about 1500 Korean men. At the conference, through the dynamic preaching of Kil Sŏn-chu and his personal confession of sins, hundreds of others followed in public repentance. This would continue through a series of revival meetings in Pyongyang and other nearby cities, which eventually subsided in the spring of 1907 due to Kil's exhaustion from the meetings.

The Pyongyang revival resulted in an increase in the number of new Protestant converts and the growing establishment of Korean Christianity led by Korean Protestants. It also introduced key aspects of Korean Protestant Christian spirituality, such as early morning prayer and all-night prayer.

== See also ==
- 1904–1905 Welsh revival
- Manchurian revival
