= Kosin Presbyterian Church in Korea =

Protestant denomination in South Korea

- Classification: Protestant
- Orientation: Presbyterian
- Scripture: Protestant Bible
- Theology: Reformed; Evangelical
- Polity: Presbyterian
- Associations: International Conference of Reformed Churches
- Region: South Korea, United States, worldwide
- Origin: 1952; South Korea
- Branched from: Presbyterian Church of Korea
- Separations: Presbyterian Church in Korea (HapDong)
- Congregations: 2,056 (2017)
- Members: 473,497 (2017)
- Ministers: 3,753 (2017)

- Kosin Presbyterian Church in Korea
- Hangul: 대한예수교장로회(고신)
- Hanja: 大韓예수敎長老會(高神)
- Revised Romanization: Daehan yesugyo jangnohoe Gosin
- McCune–Reischauer: Taehan yesugyo changnohoe Kosin

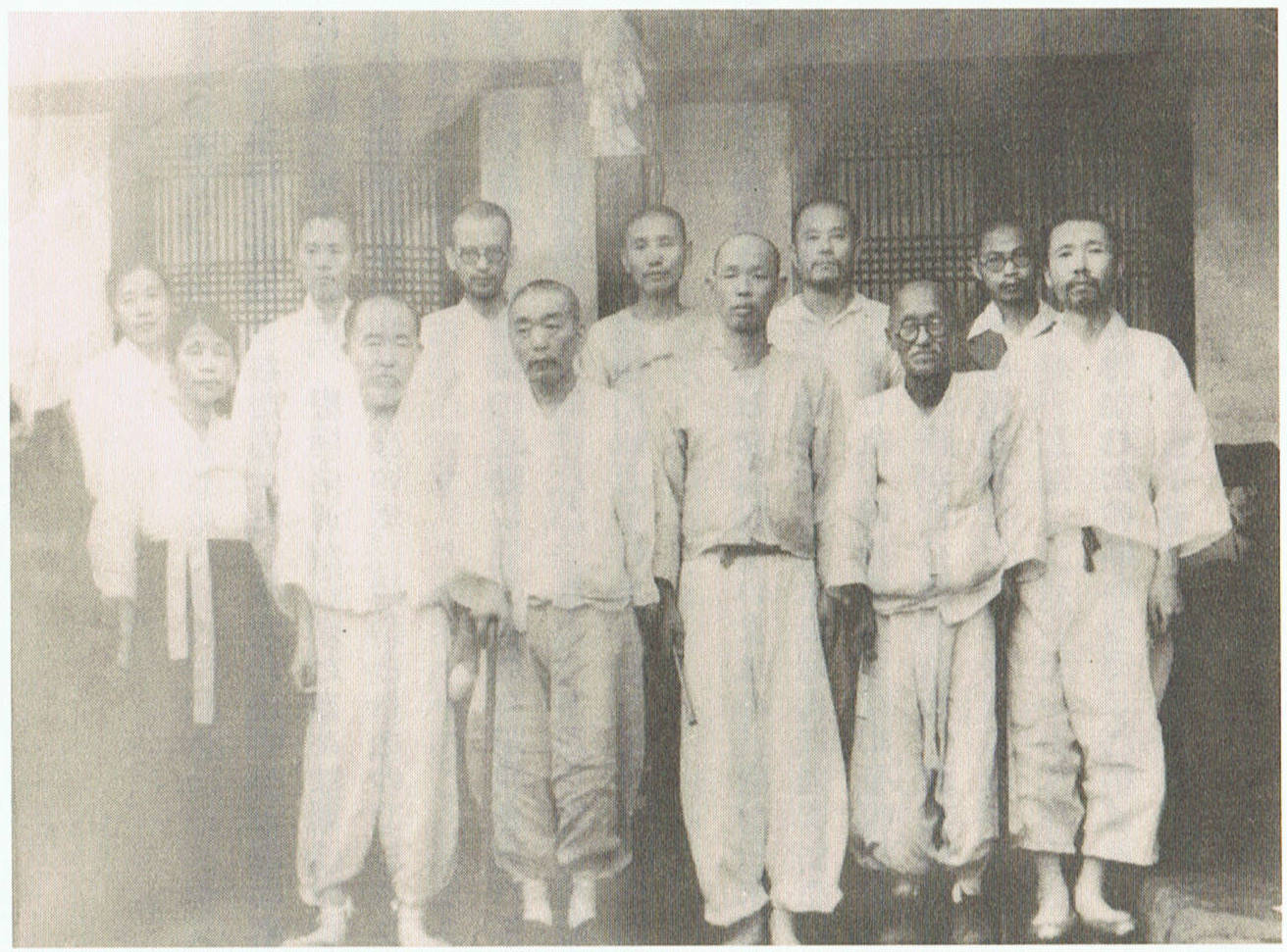

The Kosin Presbyterian Church in Korea, also called Korea-pa, is an Evangelical Reformed and Presbyterian denomination in the Republic of South Korea. Although, congregations have spread all over North America and in many other countries.

The key phrase used to identify the belief of Kosin is "Life before God (Coram Deo)", or "Life within the authentic (Apostle's) faith". The denomination was built upon the faith of martyrs who rejected shrine worship during the Japanese oppression. The ministers who established the synod of Kosin believed that the purpose of the establishment is not in martyrdom, but it is in the continuing existence of the Apostle's faith and teaching, purity of life, as well as foundation of churches in Korea and the world under the reformed faith. In order to preserve the catholic Christian faith, The Kosin Presbyterian Church in Korea embraces the Bible as the principle scripture, but also employs Westminster Standards as the primary documents.

The church proclaims the following phrases as the principles for life:

- God Centered
- Bible Centered
- Church Centered

== History ==
=== Mission in Korea and Growth of Presbyterian Church ===
The Presbyterian mission began in Korea by a medical missionary, Dr. H. N. Allen of Presbyterian Church in the United States of America. On April 5, 1885, Presbyterian missionary named H.G. Underwood arrived in Korea and the Presbyterian mission in Korea began to bloom. In January 1893, Congregation of Presbyterian Missionaries was established and on May 15, 1901, Pyongyang Presbyterian Theological Seminary was established. After few years, on September 17, 1907, the synod of Joseon Presbyterian Church was organized.

=== Colonial Oppression of Japan and Demand for Shrine Worship ===
In 1910, Japan enforced annexation of Joseon and proclaimed the slogan "Japan and Korea are One" as an effort to colonize Korea and other Asian countries using the idea of militaristic imperialism. The slogan was used to force people to become "japanized", by enforcing Japanese language, shrine worship and deification of the Japanese emperor, as well as enforcing Japanese culture. Christian schools were the first victim of Japanese colonization. While Japan exclaimed that, "shrine worship is not a religious ceremony but a nationalistic ceremony", many Christian schools resisted shrine worship and voluntarily closed. The churches in Korea was the next target and starting in 1935, many Christian denominations including Seventh-Day Adventist, Methodists, Salvationists, the Holiness Church, the Anglican church and Roman Catholic Church accepted the shrine worship.

As for the Presbyterian Church in Korea, the regional synod of Northern Pyongan was the first branch to accept the shrine worship and many other synods began to follow.

=== Resistance to Shrine Worship and Liberation of Korea ===
In efforts to preserve the Christian faith, movement of resistance to shrine worship was formed by a group of ministers who wanted to protect the Gospel. Many ministers at Pyongyang Presbyterian Theological Seminary were displaced and the seminary eventually closed. Reverends Joo Ki-Chul, Han Sang-Dong, Joo Nam-Sun and other ministers were arrested at Pyongyang imprisonment camp and tortured. Churches in Korea lost their functionality under Japanese oppression and on August 1, 1945, all churches were combined under Japan-Joseon Christian churches. During the oppression, Joo died while resisting the Japanese enforcement and the shrine worship.

When Korea was liberated on August 15, 1945, the remaining ministers who suffered from Japanese imprisonment were released. Recognizing the state of Christianity in Korea, they decided to establish a pure and conservative theological seminary built upon the foundation of reformed faith. In 1946, Han and Joo took the lead in establishing the seminary and as a result, Koryeo Theological Seminary opened.

Three pastors founded the Ko-Ryeo Seminary but the Presbyterian Church refused to recognize this seminary. Founders of KoRyu Seminary and BupDong presbytery established later, on September 11, 1952, the General Assembly of the Presbyterian Church in Korea (Kosin).

In December 1960 it was united with the mainline Presbyterian Church in Korea (HapDong), but it lasted until 1963 when the church withdrew from the union and returned to its original form and continues to this day. Only 150 churches remained with the Presbyterian Church (Hapdong). In 1976 a split occurred in the church, the Presbyterian Church in Korea (Ko-Ryeo Pa) was founded, but one part of this reunited with the Kosin church. The Kosin group developed steadily. The denominational headquarters is located in Seoul, South Korea. It consists of a variety of offices, like General Secretary, publishing house, Department of Church Education and the Mission Training Institute.

In 2002 it celebrated its 50th anniversary.

=== Separations ===
- In 1965 the Presbyterian Church in Korea (KoRyuPa) was formed.
- In 1976 the Presbyterian Church in Korea (Ko-Ryu-Anti-Accusation)
- In 1980 the Korea Jesus Presbyterian Church separated from the Kosin church.

== Theology ==
The Presbyterian Church in Korea (Kosin) is a Reformed church, and affirms the historic Presbyterian Confessions:

- Westminster Confession of Faith (1647)
- Westminster Larger Catechism
- Westminster Shorter Catechism
- Apostles Creed

== Statistics ==
The Presbyterian Church in Korea (Kosin) group has 34 Presbyteries that form the General Assembly, 1577 churches, 230,000 baptized, 350,000 communicant and non-communicant members, and 2,300 ordained pastors. There is no women's ordination.

== Institutions and Seminary ==
- The Kosin University was established in the 1950s. It was authorised by the Korean Ministry of Education in 1970 and now has more than 4,300 enrolled students, 221 professors, and 22 departments.
- Korea Theological Seminary has 400 full-time students and was founded in 1946. It offers M.Div degrees authorised by the Ministry Education and a Th.M.
- Kosin University Hospital is called the Gospel Clinic, presently has over 1,100 beds.
- In Kosin University Graduate School they offer PHD's in Theology and Medicine and Public Health.

== Missions ==
- foreign missions - the church has 220 missionaries in 46 countries
- home missions - the Committee of Evangelism is committed to plant churches across South Korea and there 30 chaplains to the Korean military, the Committee of Evangelism in Rural Areas is in charge of planting churches in rural areas

== International organisations ==
The Kosin group is a member of the International Conference of Reformed Churches. In mission field they work closely with the Orthodox Presbyterian Church in the USA. The Presbyterian Church in Korea (Kosin) has sister church relations with the following churches:

- Reformed Churches in the Netherlands (Liberated)
- Orthodox Presbyterian Church
- Reformed Church in Japan
- Canadian and American Reformed Churches
- Free Reformed Churches of Australia

== Controversies ==
- Some pastors and congregants within the Kosin denomination claim that Pastor Son Hyun-bo (Segyero Church) has recently delivered sermons that are close to political agitation, seriously damaging the essence of worship and the pulpit. Under the name "Gathering of Kosin-Loving Believers" (Gosamo), they issued a statement on February 17, 2025, demanding disciplinary action against Pastor Son from the Kosin General Assembly. Meanwhile, the group "Kosin Pastors Who Love the Nation" has declared their support for Pastor Son Hyun-bo (Saegero Church) and urged the dismissal of the impeachment motion against President Yoon Suk-yeol. As of now, approximately 150 Kosin-affiliated pastors are reported to have joined this initiative.

== See also ==
- Kosin University
- Presbyterian Church in Korea (HapDong)
- Korea Presbyterian Theological Seminary(KPTS)
