= Presbyterian Church in the Republic of Korea =

Presbyterian denomination in South Korea

- Classification: Protestant
- Orientation: Calvinist
- Theology: Reformed
- Polity: Presbyterian
- Associations: World Council of Churches, World Communion of Reformed Churches
- Region: South Korea
- Origin: 1960; Seoul
- Congregations: 998
- Members: 335,000
- Ministers: 830

Korean name
- Hangul: 한국기독교장로회
- Hanja: 韓國基督敎長老會
- Revised Romanization: Hanguk gidokgyo jangnohoe
- McCune–Reischauer: Han'guk kidokkyo changnohoe

The Presbyterian Church in the Republic of Korea (Korean: 한국기독교장로회) or the KiJang (Korean: 기장) Presbyterian Church is an ecumenically minded Presbyterian denomination in South Korea.

== History ==
The Presbyterian Church in Korea was established in 1902. The first General Assembly was held in 1912. Ministers from Australia, Canada and America came in increasing number to Korea. The church faced several hardships during the Japanese occupation. The Pyungyang Seminary was forced to close its doors in 1938. Some leaders went into exile. One year later Chosun Seminary was opened in the south, this become the nucleus of KiJang. In contrast with the Pyungyang Seminary, the Chosun Seminary adopted a progressive theological line. In 1946 the Presbyterian Church of Korea adopted the Chosun Seminary. The President of the Seminary, Dr. Kim Jae-Joon, published an essay that caused a violent debate between conservatives and progressive theological positions. Dr. Park Hyung-Ryong decided to leave the seminary and he was followed by 51 students in 1947. The Assembly also recognized this new Seminary. Now there were two competing seminaries under the authority of the General assembly. The Assembly urged to unite these 2 seminaries. Later, it became obvious to the Assembly that the theological position of Chosun Seminary could not be tolerated. In 1953 the church faced theological hardships, because of the theology, methods and biblical study taught in the Chosun Theological Seminary. The conservative and fundamentalist fraction of the church rejected this teachings. The Presbyterians split in 1953 to the Presbyterian Church in Korea and the Presbyterian Church in the Republic of Korea.

== Statistics ==
In 2004 there were 326,000 members and 801 congregations with 631 ordained ministers in 10 Presbyteries.

It had 335,000 members in almost 1,000 congregations and 830 pastors in 2006.

== Theology ==
Member of the World Communion of Reformed Churches. It affirms the Westminster Confession of Faith, the Westminster Larger Catechism and Westminster Shorter Catechism.

Sister Church relations established with :

- Church of Scotland
- United Protestant Church of France
- Swiss Reformed Church
- United Church of Canada

== See also ==
- Presbyterianism in South Korea
