= Presbyterian Church in Korea (HapDong) =

Christian denomination in South Korea

Presbyterian Church in Korea (Hapdong)
- Classification: Protestant
- Orientation: Presbyterian
- Theology: Evangelical Reformed
- Polity: Presbyterian
- Region: South Korea
- Origin: 1959; South Korea
- Separated from: Presbyterian Church in Korea (TongHap)
- Branched from: Presbyterian Church of Korea
- Separations: Presbyterian Church in Korea (Koshin)
- Congregations: 11,689
- Members: 2,116,250
- Ministers: 25,840
- Official website: gapck.org

- Presbyterian Church in Korea
- Hangul: 대한예수교장로회(합동)
- Hanja: 大韓예수敎長老會(合同)
- Revised Romanization: Daehan yesugyo jangnohoe (Hapdong)
- McCune–Reischauer: Taehan yesugyo changnohoe (Haptong)

The General Assembly of Presbyterian Church in Korea (GAPCK), also known as Yejang Hapdong (Korean: 예장합동) or just Hapdong, is an Evangelical Presbyterian denomination. It currently has the 9th largest membership in all Presbyterian denomination in the world, and 2nd biggest Christian church in South Korea. The headquarters of the church is in Seoul, South Korea.

== History ==
In the 1950s, the Presbyterian Church of Korea suffered from a series of schisms over issues of theology, ecumenism, and worship.

In 1951, the first division occurred resulting in the Presbyterian Church in Korea (Kosin). due to a controversy that began in the 1930s, when Korea was still under Japanese rule. At that time, university students were instructed to bow to the Shinto shrine in worship, which was theologically and politically controversial among Christians. While many complied, some Christians at Pyongyang Theological Seminary adamantly opposed it, holding that the Bible prohibited such actions. After Korea's liberation from Japanese rule and subsequent division, many northern Koreans relocated to the south. Those who formerly opposed the Shinto shrine worship established a new seminary, Koryo Theological Seminary (now Kosin University) in 1946.

In 1953, the second division occurred, when progressives separated to form the Presbyterian Church of the Republic of Korea (KiJang). In the 1970s, the KiJang Presbyterians would produce some of the key leaders of minjung theology, a movement advocating social justice under the dictatorship of Park Chung Hee.

In 1959, at the 44th General Assembly, a third schism divided the Presbyterian Church of Korea into two equal branches: the Presbyterian Church of Korea (TongHap) and the Presbyterian Church in Korea (HapDong). The main issue was whether the Church should be a part of the ecumenical organization, the World Council of Churches (WCC). Park Hyun-nyon, President of the Presbyterian Seminary of the General Assembly, led the formation of the Evangelical "HapDong" (the union body), whereas those who supported relations with the WCC formed the ecumenical "TongHap" (the united body). Today, TongHap and HapDong represent the largest factions of Korean Presbyterianism.

Hapdong was the more conservative group in the schism. Its conservative doctrinal basis made it possible to unite later with the Presbyterian Church in Korea (Koshin) in 1960. But this union did not last and a group of Koshin churches separated a few years later, although about 150 Koshin congregations stayed with HapDong. In 1961, another group separated to form the Bible Presbyterian Church, later to be called the Presbyterian Church in Korea (Daeshin).

At the 64th General assembly in 1979 the church suffered another division. Kim Hee Bo the President of the ChongShin Seminary advocated for the historical-critical approach to the Pentateuch. The church divided into a mainline and non-mainline groups. The debate centered about two issues: the authorship of the Pentateuch and the relationship with the ChongShin Seminary. The non-mainline section fragmented in the following years.

In the 1990s the Hapdong branch experienced phenomenal growth. By the early 2000s, Hapdong developed into the largest denomination in South Korea with more than 2.2 million communicant members, 5,123 congregations, and 6,300 ordained pastors. These figures differ from the statistics offered by Chongshin Seminary, which claims the church has 11,000 congregations and about 3 million members.

In South Korea there are about 15 million Protestants, about 9 million are Presbyterians in more than 100 denominations.

== Doctrine ==
Hapdong is a theologically conservative denomination. The Hapdong group subscribe the historic Presbyterian Confessions, such as the Apostles' Creed, the Westminster Confession of Faith, the Westminster Larger Catechism, and the Westminster Shorter Catechism.

=== Women in ministry ===
According to most conservative Presbyterian interpretations of the Apostle Paul's instructions, there are no women ordinations. However, at the 2024 109th General Assembly, the preaching rights of female ministers were officially approved.

=== The stance on homosexuality ===
Hapdong declare that homosexuality goes against God's creation order, calling it anti-biblical and unethical, and continue opposing the Supreme Court's ruling on same-sex partner rights. They emphasize the importance of maintaining a biblical understanding of gender and marriage. Additionally, they strongly oppose the comprehensive anti-discrimination law, citing concerns over the violation of fundamental rights such as freedom of conscience and religion.

== Theological education ==
The Chongshin University and the Chongshin Seminary are the only official educational institutions of the Hapdong Church to train pastors.

== Missions ==
The General Assembly of Presbyterian Church in Korea created the Global Missions Society (GMS) in South Korea to support evangelism and missions. The Global Mission Society, the missionary body of the Hapdong General Assembly of Presbyterian Churches of Korea, is the single largest Presbyterian missionary organization in South Korea and the world with over 2,500 missionaries working in Europe, Asia, Russia, Latin America, Africa.
