= Seo Sang-ryun =

Early Korean Protestant (Presbyterian) Christian (1848-1926)

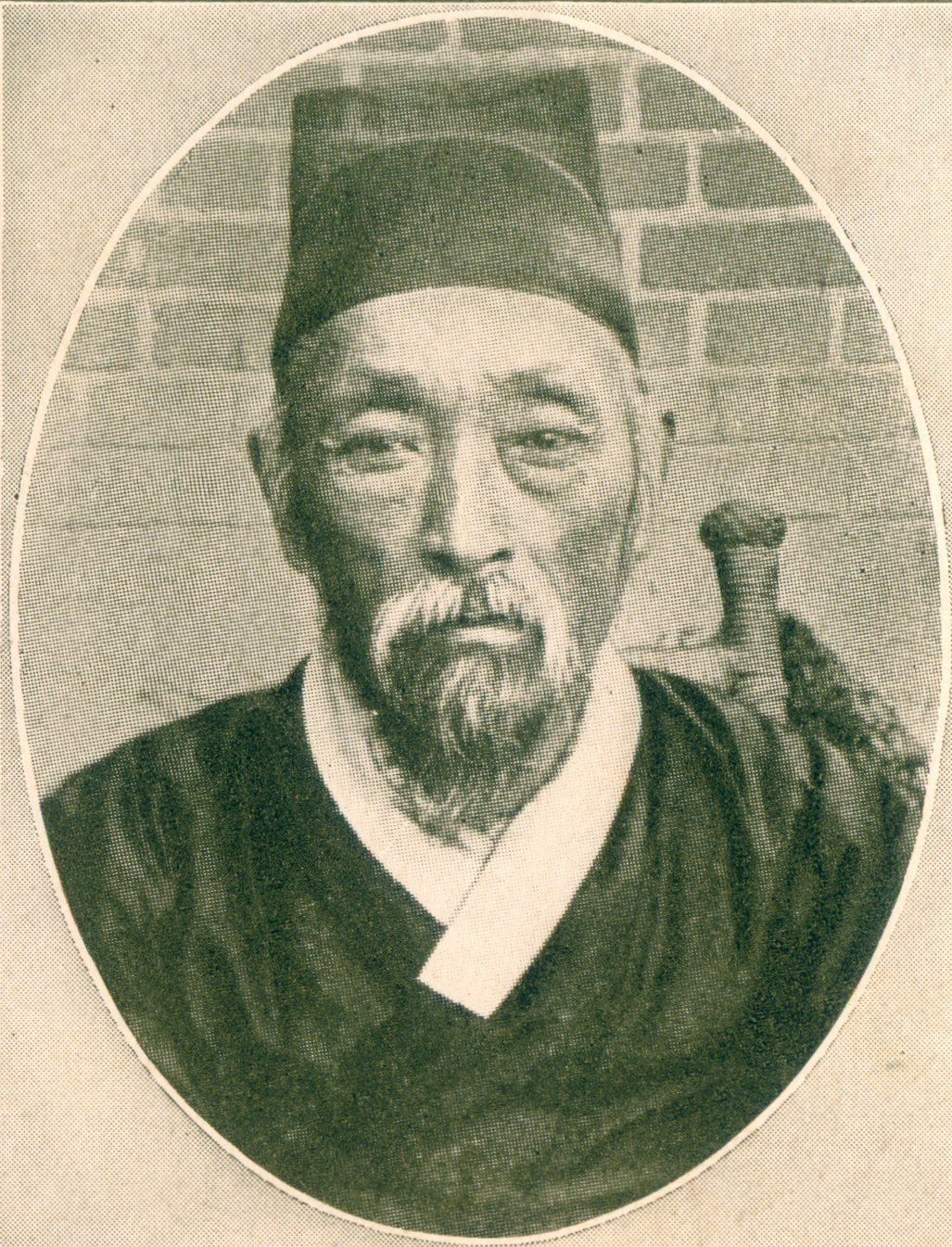
Seo in 1918

Seo Sang-ryun (Korean: 서상륜; Hanja: 徐相崙; RR: Seo Sangryun; MR: Sŏ Sangnyun, 1848–1926), along with his brother Seo Sang-u (Korean: 서상우; Hanja: 徐相佑; RR: Seo Sangu; MR: Sŏ Sangu), founded the first Protestant (Presbyterian ) church in Korea in 1884. It was established in the village of Sorae, Hwanghae Province, where his uncle lived. He was born into the Daegu Seo Clan.

Seo Sang-ryun was involved in the trade of ginseng in Manchuria and fell ill, coming close to death. He would be nursed back to health by the Scottish Presbyterian missionary John Macintyre and baptized by John Ross. Seo would later assist Ross in the translation of the gospel of Luke, helping to produce the first translation of the Bible into Korean.

== See also ==
- John Ross
- Korean Bible
