= Persecution of Christians in North Korea =

Ongoing persecution in North Korea

- Location: North Korea
- Date: 1949–present
- Victim: 50,000 to 70,000 Christians interned in prison camps
- Perpetrator: Government of North Korea

The persecution of Christians in North Korea is an ongoing and systematic human rights violation in North Korea. According to multiple resolutions which have been passed by the United Nations Commission on Human Rights, the North Korean government has "persistently persecuted" Christians outside of state-sanctioned religious organizations, because they could challenge the personality cult of Kim Il Sung and his family. The Workers' Party of Korea has cracked down on religious proselytizing since its founding, considering it a tool of "imperialist countries" who "dispach missionaries in order to invade other nations". The North Korean state uses this argument to justify its activities, with Kim Il Sung stating in 1946 that religion should be "subjected to the interests of the state".

In 2002, it was estimated that there were 12,000 Protestants and 800 Catholics in North Korea, but South Korean and international church-related groups gave considerably higher estimates, such as 406,000 Christians.

== History ==
=== Francis Hong Yong-ho ===
In 1949, Francis Hong Yong-ho, a North Korean prelate of the Catholic Church, was imprisoned under the rule of Kim II Sung and later declared to be missing. He was never found, and his death was officially acknowledged by the Holy See in June 2013.

== Treatment of Christians ==
According to the Christian organization Open Doors, North Korea persecutes Christians more than any other country in the world.

In a study of 117 North Koreans who had been affected by religious persecution, which was conducted by the Korea Future Initiative, it was found that Christians made up about 80% of the people who were surveyed.

=== Imprisonment ===
Christian Solidarity Worldwide says that there are numerous reports of people being sent to prison camps and subjected to torture and inhuman treatment because of their faith. The family members of reported Christians are also said to be targeted, including children. The youngest of these recorded detainees was two years old at the time of their arrest.

Open Doors estimates that 50,000–70,000 Christians are held in North Korean prison camps. According to the Korea Future Initiative, Christians are "disproportionally imprisoned" compared to North Koreans of other faiths.

According to interviews which have been given by refugees, if the North Korean authorities discover that North Korean refugees who were deported from China have converted to Christianity, they are subjected to harsher treatment, torture, and prolonged imprisonment.

=== Executions ===
According to AsiaNews, during Kim Il Sung's administration, all non-foreign Catholic priests were executed, and Protestant leaders who did not renounce their faith were purged as "American spies." The martyrdom of the Benedictine monks of Tokwon Abbey was documented as the process of beatification was initiated for them.

==== Public executions ====
There are reports of public executions of Christians, with a North Korean defector reporting that one Christian was publicly executed in front of a thousand people. For example, Ri Hyon-ok was allegedly publicly executed in Ryongchon on June 16, 2009, for giving out Bibles, while her husband and children were deported to the Hoeryong political prison camp.

=== Situation of churches ===
From 1949 to the mid-1950s, under the rule of Kim Il Sung, all churches were closed. However, since 1988, four church buildings have been erected in Pyongyang with foreign donations: one Catholic, two Protestant and one Russian Orthodox. The services are used to bring in foreign currency from foreign visitors, including South Koreans. It is claimed that the churches are solely there for propaganda purposes. Defectors to South Korea claim that most North Koreans are unaware that the churches exist. According to Christian Solidarity Worldwide, it is known that underground churches are mainly located along the western region of North Korea, possibly due to its proximity to China. These underground churches operate on a very small scale or within family units. The distribution of religious materials and evangelism is carried out in very small groups, maintaining an extremely high level of secrecy.

=== Bibles ===
The Bible is reported to have been banned in North Korea and several incidents have emerged in which Christians were arrested or executed for possessing and/or selling the book, while other reports state that they have their own translated Bible.

In 2014, an American citizen, Jeffrey Edward Fowle, was detained for several months for proselytism after authorities discovered him leaving a Bible behind in a public restroom during his vacation in the country.

== Detention of clergy ==
Several pastors, priests, and missionaries who have been campaigning against the persecution have been detained by the North Korean government, for periods ranging from a few weeks to more than two years, including:

- Hyeon Soo Lim, a Canadian pastor
- Robert Park, an American activist of North Korean Christian descent
- John Short, an Australian missionary
- Kenneth Bae, an American missionary

== Reactions ==
In 2023, the country was scored zero out of 4 for religious freedom; as of May 2021, Christian Solidarity Worldwide estimated that almost 200,000 people were held in prison camps, mainly due to their Christian beliefs.

In the same year, the country was ranked as the worst place in the world to be a Christian.

North Korea is listed as number one on Open Doors' 2025 World Watchlist, an annually updated ranking of the 50 countries in which Christians face the most extreme persecution.

The persecution has been condemned by a variety of different organizations and movements, including Genocide Watch, the SDLP, and the British Government.

== See also ==
- Anti-Christian sentiment
- Human rights in North Korea
- Prisons in North Korea
- Persecution of Christians
- Religion in North Korea
- Freedom of religion in North Korea
- Jaegaseung
