= List of foreign nationals detained in North Korea =

Foreign nationals who have been detained in North Korea. Excluded from the list are any persons who were detained while on active military duty and held as prisoners of war or military defectors. Also excluded are people abducted in other countries and brought into North Korea.

== Detained Australians ==
Name	Detained	Released	Days in detention	Reason for detention	Ref.
John Short	16 February 2014	3 March 2014	15	Unauthorized religious activity	
Alek Sigley	25 June 2019	4 July 2019	9	Espionage, was arrested while studying in Pyongyang. After negotiations through the Swedish embassy in North Korea, he was released.	

== Detained South Korean citizens ==
Name	Detained	Released	Days in detention	Reason for detention	Ref.
Min Young Mi	20 June 1999	25 June 1999	5	"Preaching defection". Detained after conversing with a North Korean tour guide.	
Kim Jung Wook (alternative spelling: Kim Jong Uk)	8 October 2013	In detention	4,799	Unknown, possibly connected with Christian missionary work. Alleged activities as a "South Korean National Intelligence Service agent".	
Joo Won Moon	22 April 2015	5 October 2015	166	Illegally entering North Korea via China	
Kim Kook Kie	June 2015	In detention	4,191	Committing "anti-DPRK espionage activities under the manipulation of the U.S. and puppet South Korea"	
Choi Chun Kil	June 2015	In detention	4,191	Committing "anti-DPRK espionage activities under the manipulation of the U.S. and puppet South Korea"	
Ko Hyon Chol	July 2016	In detention	3,795	Alleged kidnapping of orphans	

== Detained U.S. citizens ==
Name	Detained	Released	Days in detention	Reason for detention	Ref.
Evan Hunziker	24 August 1996	27 November 1996	95	Illegally entering North Korea	
Kwang Duk Lee	26 May 1998	27 August 1998	93	Espionage	
Karen Jung-sook Han	17 June 1999	20 July 1999	33	Committing "an illegal act". Was accused of insulting local officials.	
Euna Lee	17 March 2009	4 August 2009	140	Illegally entering North Korea (see 2009 imprisonment of American journalists by North Korea)	
Laura Ling	17 March 2009	4 August 2009	140	Illegally entering North Korea (see 2009 imprisonment of American journalists by North Korea)	
Robert Park	25 December 2009	6 February 2010	43	Illegally entering North Korea	
Aijalon Gomes	25 January 2010	26 August 2010	213	Illegally entering North Korea	
Eddie Yong Su Jun	November 2010	28 May 2011	~208	"Committing a crime" against North Korea	
Kenneth Bae	3 November 2012	8 November 2014	735	Unauthorized religious activity	
Merrill Newman	26 October 2013	7 December 2013	42	Issues related to his service in the Korean War	
Matthew Miller	10 April 2014	8 November 2014	212	Acts hostile to the DPRK while entering under the guise of a tourist. He had travelled to North Korea intending to get arrested.	
Jeffrey Fowle	4 May 2014	21 October 2014	170	Acting "contrary to the purpose of tourism" by leaving a Bible at a nightclub	
Arturo Pierre Martinez	10 November 2014	December 2014	~21	Illegally entering North Korea	
Sandra Suh	8 April 2015		0	Deported for "covertly producing photos and videos to use in the anti-DPRK smear campaign"	
Miles, no surname given	13 August 2015	October 2015	~49	Illegally entering North Korea. Previously sought legal long-term residence. Story initially went unreported, but was later verified and broken by NK News on condition of anonymity.	
Kim Dong Chul	October 2015	9 May 2018	952	Espionage	
Otto Warmbier	2 January 2016	13 June 2017 (Note: Warmbier died six days after being released.)	529	Committing "hostile acts" against the DPRK by allegedly stealing a propaganda poster from his hotel. Released back in a vegetative state, later succumbing to injuries inflicted from "severe brain damage".	
Sang-duk Kim (Tony Kim)	21 April 2017	9 May 2018	384	Committing "hostile criminal acts with an aim to subvert the country"	
Hak-song Kim	7 May 2017	9 May 2018	368	Committing "hostile acts" against the state	
Bruce Byron Lowrance (Note: Lowrance's surname was misspelled and transposed in some news reports.)	16 October 2018	16 November 2018	31	Illegally entering North Korea via China	
Travis King	18 July 2023	27 September 2023	71	Crossing the Military Demarcation Line into North Korea while on a civilian tour (Deemed an illegal intrusion/deported)	

== Other detained foreign citizens ==
Name	Country	Detained	Released	Days in detention	Reason for detention	Ref.
Alí Lameda	Venezuela	September 1967	27 September 1974	~2,555	Communist and translator working in the Foreign Affairs Ministry of North Korea, reportedly for joking about Kim Il-sung at an official feast. In a 1975 interview, Lameda expressed that his detention could have been a result of pressure by the Communist Party of Cuba after the Communist Party of Venezuela decided to accept pacification and abandon arms.	
Eduardo Murillo	Chile	September 1967	May 1968	~-243	Same background as Ali Lameda, see above	
Hyeon Soo Lim	Canada	February 2015	9 August 2017	~920	"Harming the dignity of the supreme leadership, trying to use religion to destroy the North Korean system"	
Jacques Sedillot	France	September 1967	27 September 1974	~2,555	Same background as Ali Lameda, see above	
Tomoyuki Sugimoto	Japan	27 August 2018		0	Alleged filming a military facility	

== See also ==
- North Korean abductions of Japanese citizens
- North Korean abductions of South Koreans
- China–North Korea border
- Travis King
- David Louis Sneddon
