= Aijalon Gomes =

American teacher detained after illegally entering North Korea

- Born: Aijalon Mahli Gomes; June 19, 1979; Boston, Massachusetts, U.S.
- Died: November 17, 2017 (aged 38); San Diego, California, U.S.
- Education: Bowdoin College
- Occupation: Teacher
- Known for: Arrest and detention in North Korea

Detainment
- Country: North Korea
- Detained: January 25, 2010
- Released: August 26, 2010
- Days in detention: 213
- Reason for detention: Illegally entering North Korea

Aijalon Mahli Gomes (/ˈaɪdʒɑːlɒn ˈɡoʊmz/; June 19, 1979 – November 17, 2017) was an American teacher who was detained in North Korea for illegally entering the country via China on January 25, 2010. On August 27, 2010, it was announced that former U.S. president Jimmy Carter had secured Gomes's release. In May 2015, Gomes published an autobiography, Violence and Humanity. In November 2017, he was found burned to death in what was ruled a suicide.

== Early life ==
Gomes was born and raised in Boston, Massachusetts. He graduated from Bowdoin College in 2001 and subsequently went to South Korea to teach English.

== Arrest in North Korea ==
For two years prior to his arrest, Gomes taught English at Chungui Middle School in Gyeonggi Province, South Korea for the GEPIK teaching program. As a devout Christian, who regularly attended the Every Nation Church in Seoul, it is thought that he crossed into North Korea to act as a missionary and offer humanitarian aid. Another worshiper at the same church, Korean-American Robert Park, had illegally walked into North Korea one month before Gomes did, but was released after being detained there for six weeks.

Gomes wrote in his autobiography that he had initially planned to enter North Korea directly from South Korea by crossing the Korean Demilitarized Zone in Cheorwon County on January 18, 2010, but found himself unable to navigate the area on foot. On January 24, he flew from South Korea to China's Yanji Chaoyangchuan Airport and travelled to Tumen City. On January 25 he crossed the Sino-Korean border by walking across a frozen stretch of the Tumen River into North Korea, where he was immediately apprehended by border guards for illegal entry. On April 6, 2010, he was sentenced to eight years of hard labor and fined $700,000 (USD). He was allowed to speak to his mother by phone on April 30, 2010.

In June 2010, North Korea threatened "harsher punishment" if the United States continued its "hostile approach" in the follow-up to the sinking of the ROKS Cheonan, a South Korean warship. It was concluded by the United Nations Security Council that the ship had been sunk by a North Korean submarine. North Korea denied any involvement, and threatened that if the dispute continued, they would feel compelled to consider "applying a wartime law" to Gomes, which could mean a life sentence or even the death penalty. The following month, Gomes was reported to have been hospitalized following a suicide attempt.

== Release ==
Starting in April 2010, a sustained human rights letter-writing campaign sprang up to insist upon Gomes' release. In August, a U.S. consular delegation visited Pyongyang to request permission to bring Gomes home, but were unsuccessful. Shortly afterward, former president Jimmy Carter flew out to North Korea to personally negotiate Gomes' release. The Obama administration stressed that this was a private humanitarian effort, and that Carter was acting solely in his capacity as a private citizen, and not on behalf of the United States government. Carter arrived in Pyongyang on August 25, and on August 26, Gomes was released. The Korean Central News Agency reported that "Jimmy Carter made an apology to Kim Yong Nam for American Gomes' illegal entry into North Korea and gave him the assurance that such case will never happen again".

On his repatriation to the U.S., family members reported that Gomes was a little thin but was otherwise in good physical health. Asked in an interview whether he had suffered torture in North Korea, Gomes responded that "there were moments of violence and of humanity." His remark became the title of his self-published 2015 autobiography, Violence and Humanity.

== Death ==
Gomes died on November 17, 2017, in the Mission Bay Park part of San Diego. Gomes was 38 years old at the time, had recently moved from Boston to San Diego, and was believed to be homeless at the time of his death. He was spotted on fire in a dirt field, running, and then collapsing. His death was ruled a suicide by the San Diego County Medical Examiner, whose report found that Gomes had suffered post-traumatic stress disorder following his release from North Korea.

== See also ==
- 2009 imprisonment of American journalists by North Korea
- Human Rights in North Korea
- List of Americans detained by North Korea
