= Jeffrey Edward Fowle =

American prisoner of North Korea

Jeffrey E. Fowle
- Born: 1958 (age 67–68); Miamisburg, Ohio, U.S.
- Occupation: Municipal worker
- Known for: Arrest and detention in North Korea

Detainment
- Country: North Korea
- Detained: May 4, 2014
- Released: October 21, 2014
- Days in detention: 170
- Reason for detention: Proselytism

Jeffrey Edward Fowle (born 1958) is an American citizen who was arrested during a vacation in North Korea in May 2014 for leaving a Bible in a club in the northern port city of Chongjin.

== Personal life ==
Fowle is from Miamisburg, Ohio, and worked in the Moraine, Ohio municipal street department. His wife, Tatyana, was born in Russia, and they have three children.

== Arrest ==
In May 2014, while on a guided tour of North Korea, Fowle deliberately left a Korean-English Bible in the restroom of the Chongjin Sailor's Club. Religious proselytism is a crime in North Korea. The Bible was discovered by a staff member and handed in to local authorities. Fowle was arrested at Pyongyang International Airport as his tour group was preparing to leave the country. At the time, Fowle was one of three U.S. citizens detained in North Korea, the others being Kenneth Bae and Matthew Todd Miller. They were individually granted interviews with two U.S. news outlets, CNN and Associated Press, pleading for assistance from the U.S. government.

== Release ==
On October 21, 2014, Fowle was released and flown out of North Korea on a U.S. government jet. Sweden facilitated Fowle's release in its capacity as the United States' protecting power in North Korea, as the United States and North Korea did not have formal diplomatic relations.
