= Sandra Suh =

American aid worker

Sandra Suh is an American aid worker deported from North Korea in 2015 on charges of "using her humanitarian status as a cover to gather and produce anti-Pyongyang propaganda."

== Humanitarian Efforts ==
In 1989, Suh founded a California-based organization, Wheat Mission Ministries. In 2005, Wheat Mission Ministries formally established itself as a non-profit organization. The organization provides food aid and medical technology to North Korea. The Korean Central News Agency said that Suh had frequently visited North Korea over the past 20 years.

=== Deportation ===
On 8 April 2015, Suh was deported "on charges of using her humanitarian status as a cover to gather and produce anti-Pyongyang propaganda", visiting "under the pretense of humanitarianism", and "secretly taken photos and produced videos that had then been used as "propaganda abroad". KCNA said "the decision to deport rather than detain her had been made "taking into full consideration her old age"".

As of 9 April 2015, US Department of State spokeswoman Marie Harf could not tell why Suh was deported.

== See also ==
- List of Americans detained by North Korea
