= North Korean Human Rights Act of 2004 =

United States law

- Long title: An act to promote human rights and freedom in the Democratic People's Republic of Korea, and for other purposes.
- Enacted by: the 108th United States Congress
- Effective: October 18, 2004

Citations
- Public law: 108-333
- Statutes at Large: 118 Stat. 1287, 1288, 1289, 1290, 1291, 1292, 1293, 1294, 1295, 1296 and 1297

Legislative history
- Introduced in the House as H.R. 4011 by James Leach (R-IA) on March 23, 2004; Committee consideration by International Relations and Judiciary; Passed the House on July 21, 2004 (voice vote); Passed the Senate on September 28, 2004 (unanimous consent) with amendment; House agreed to Senate amendment on October 4, 2004 (voice vote); Signed into law by President George W. Bush on October 18, 2004

Signed into U.S. law by President George W. Bush on October 18, 2004, the North Korean Human Rights Act was intended to promote human rights and freedom of North Korean refugees by:

1. Providing humanitarian assistance to North Koreans inside North Korea;
2. Providing grants to private, non-profit organizations to promote human rights, democracy, rule of law, and the development of a market economy in North Korea;
3. Increasing the availability of information inside North Korea;
4. Providing humanitarian or legal assistance to North Koreans who have fled North Korea.

== Background ==
The North Korean Human Rights Act of 2004 passed the U.S. Senate on September 28, 2004, after a lengthy amendment process, and, with no further changes, passed the U.S. House of Representatives on October 4. It was signed by President Bush on October 18, 2004.

According to a statement released by the White House on October 21, 2004, the "Act provides [the U.S.] with useful new tools to address the deplorable human rights situation in North Korea by focusing [U.S.] efforts to help both those who flee the regime and those who are trapped inside the country."

According to a March 23, 2004, House resolution, the intent of the Act is "[t]o promote human rights and freedom in the Democratic People's Republic of Korea, and for other purposes."

The Act earmarked $24 million a year and made North Koreans eligible for political asylum in the U.S.

The Act contains several statutes about promoting the Human Rights of North Koreans, assisting North Koreans in need, and protecting North Korean Refugees. Some are listed as following: Sec. 102. support for human rights and democracy programs, Sec. 105. United Nations Commission on Human Rights, Sec. 107. special envoy on human rights in North Korea, Sec. 202(a) Humanitarian assistance through Nongovernmental and International Organizations.

Sec. 302. Eligibility for refugee or asylum consideration Sec. 302(a) of the Act states that the purpose of the Act "is not intended in any way to prejudice whatever rights to citizenship North Koreans may enjoy under the Constitution of the Republic of Korea." However, interesting and potentially significant wording found in Sec. 302(b) states that "a national of the Democratic People's Republic of Korea shall not be considered a national of the Republic of Korea." Previously, North Koreans had been treated as citizens of South Korea.

On September 23, 2008, the U.S. Congress extended the Act for four more years. The North Korean Human Rights Reauthorization Act of 2008 was signed by President Bush on October 7, 2008. There were some revisions in this newest iteration of the Act, including elevating the post of U.S. special envoy on North Korean human rights to full ambassador while halving the funding for programs to promote human rights to $2 million from the initial $4 million.

== History of the North Korean Human Rights Act ==
The North Korean Human Rights Act of 2004 was originally sponsored by U.S. Senator Sam Brownback in response to "one of the worst human rights disasters in the world."

According to the Department of United States, the Government of North Korea is "a dictatorship under the absolute rule of Kim Jong Il" that continues to commit numerous, serious human rights abuses.

A large diaspora of refugees began fleeing North Korea in the mid-1990s due to ongoing privation, intermittent starvation, and political repression. Some have been resettled to South Korea, the United States, and other countries, but a large, unknown number remain in China and other East Asian nations.

Although not stated, but according to Brownback, the Act "calls on the United Nations High Commissioner for Refugees (UNHCR) to demand access to North Korean refugees in China, and urges heightened diplomatic pressure on China to reverse its policy of capturing and repatriating North Korean refugees. China must stop turning a blind eye to the suffering, persecution and execution of the citizens of its neighbor."

Despite China's obligations as a party to the 1951 United Nations Convention Relating to the Status of Refugees and the 1967 Protocol Relating to the Status of Refugees, China forcibly returns North Korean refugees back to North Korea where they face torture and imprisonment, and execution.

== Implementation ==
The law established an office at the State Department focused on North Korean human rights. It (1) authorized up to $20 million for each of the fiscal years 2005-2008 for assistance to North Korean refugees, $2 million for promoting human rights and democracy in North Korea and $2 million to promote freedom of information inside North Korea. (2) asserted that North Koreans are eligible for U.S. refugee status and instructs the State Department to facilitate the submission of applications by North Koreans seeking protection as refugees; and (3) required the President to appoint a Special Envoy to promote human rights in North Korea.

In the George W. Bush administration, the office was run by Special Envoy Jay Lefkowitz. At the conclusion of the administration, Lefkowitz issued a final report on developments since the law's enactment.

On May 5, 2006, the U.S. granted North Koreans asylum for the first time since the Act was signed. The group, six unnamed North Koreans, arrived from an unnamed Southeast Asia country, and four women of which said that they had been victims of forced marriages.

As of September 15, 2008, there have been 63 North Korean refugees who have been permitted to enter the United States, most notably the latest Kim Mi-ja (alias), who became the first North Korean defector to gain permanent residence in the U.S. without an interview. In January 2009, the United States had accepted 71 North Korean refugees for resettlement from undisclosed transit states.

North Korean Human Rights Act of 2004 called on the Broadcasting Board of Governors (BBG) to facilitate the unhindered dissemination of information in North Korea by increasing the amount of Korean-language broadcasts by Radio Free Asia RFA and Voice of America VOA. Content includes news briefs involving the Korean peninsula, interviews with North Korean defectors, and international commentary on events happening inside North Korea.

== Reauthorization ==
Although there were criticisms about the pace of the executive branch implementation of the original law; the small number of resettlements of North Korean refugees and the slow processing of such refugees overseas, H.R. 5834 The North Korean Human Rights Reauthorization Act was presented to the President on September 26, 2008 and was signed into effect on October 7, 2008.

The primary focus of the bill is to increase the United States' involvement in the assistance of North Korean refugees. The bill mentions several observations specifically regarding the minimal amount of progress that has taken place since the passage of the North Korean Human Rights Act 2004. The NKHRA was extended in 2008 highlighting the full-time position of the U.S. Special Envoy for North Korean Human Rights Issues. Julie Turner, the previous Special Envoy appointed in October 2023, served in the position until January 2025. The seat has remained vacant since. In 2012, NKHRA was extended until 2017 reaffirming China to halt repatriation of North Koreans. In its findings, Congress wrote that resettlement of North Koreans in the U.S. has risen and that they hope to make their resettlement program for North Koreans stronger.

== See also ==
- Human rights in North Korea
- Law of the United States
- North Korea–United States relations
