= Christian genocide =

Christian genocide may refer to:

- Armenian genocide (1915–1917), in the Ottoman Empire
- Sayfo or Assyrian genocide (1914–1924), in the Ottoman Empire
- Greek genocide (1913–1922), in the Ottoman Empire
- Late Ottoman genocides, historiographical approach for the Armenian, Greek, and Assyrian genocides as a single event in the Late Ottoman Empire

== See also ==
- Persecution of Christians by the Islamic State, mainly during the Syrian civil war in Iraq and Syria
- Persecution of Christians in North Korea
- Herder–farmer conflicts in Nigeria (alleged)
