= North Korean abductions =

North Korean abductions may refer to:

- North Korean abductions of South Koreans
- North Korean abductions of Japanese citizens
- Abduction of Shin Sang-ok and Choi Eun-hee
- Doina Bumbea, a Romanian abductee in North Korea
- Anocha Panjoy, a Thai abductee in North Korea
- Disappearance of David Louis Sneddon, an American possibly abducted to North Korea

== See also ==
- List of foreign nationals detained in North Korea
