= Detention of Alek Sigley =

2019 North Korean detention of Australian citizen

Alek Sigley
- Born: 3 November 1989 (age 37)
- Education: Kim Il-sung University (not completed)
- Occupations: Tour guide; Blogger
- Years active: 2013–2019
- Known for: Arrest and detention by North Korea

Detainment
- Country: North Korea
- Detained: 25 June 2019
- Charge: Espionage
- Released: 4 July 2019

Alek Sigley is an Australian national who was detained in North Korea in 2019 on espionage charges. He was released within a fortnight and expelled from the country.

== Early life ==
Sigley's father is Australian and his mother is Chinese. He finished school in Perth, Australia.

Sigley is fluent in Chinese, Japanese and Korean, holds a bachelor’s degree in Asian studies and philosophy from the Australian National University, and has also studied at Ritsumeikan Asia Pacific University, Fudan University and Sogang University.

== North Korea ==
Sigley visited the country as an exchange student in 2012. Sigley decided to start his own tour company on his fifth visit to North Korea in 2013. Sigley's tour company set itself apart from others by offering language classes from 2016 onwards. The first was held after the detention of Otto Warmbier, with Sigley in attendance as one of the participants.

In May 2018, he married his Japanese wife in Pyongyang. Guests of the wedding included South Korean celebrities Nikolai Johnsen and Carlos Gorito and Russian scholar Andrei Lankov. Sigley is said to have travelled to North Korea at least ten times before electing to enroll in tertiary education there.

In an article written for The Guardian, Sigley recounted that on Tuesday 25 June, he was approached in the internet room of the university's dormitory while he was finishing off homework about a North Korean short story ahead of an afternoon class, and ordered to attend a meeting. He was then ushered into a black Mercedes Benz, which took him to an undisclosed location, where he was detained for nine days in a room with no clock, completely cut off from the outside world, where he was made to write forced confessions to "crimes" he allegedly committed during his time studying in the country. When he was finally released from detention, he was made to read a "letter of apology" confessing to "threatening world peace", "infringing upon the sovereignty of the DPRK", among other heinous acts, while acknowledging that his human rights had been respected.

Swedish politician Kent Härstedt was responsible for negotiating the release of Sigley. Upon being released from detention, Sigley travelled to Beijing, then Tokyo. Before his expulsion from North Korea, Sigley was particularly keen on sharing photos of his trips on his tour company website and blogging about his experiences on the same website as well as news outlets such as The Guardian's opinion section and NK News. It has been suggested his contributions to NK News might have been the reason for his detention. NK News have confirmed this, but denied allegations that Sigley's articles were anti-DPRK or political in any way. After being released from detention, Sigley announced that his tour company would no longer be offering tours to the country. His business partner Michelle Joyce noted that their tour company hoped to re-establish tours to the country in the future. She also believed Sigley intends to return to North Korea.

== See also ==
- Troy Collings
- John Short (missionary)
- List of foreign nationals detained in North Korea
- Tourism in North Korea
- Australia–North Korea relations
