= Kosuke Takahashi =

Japanese journalist

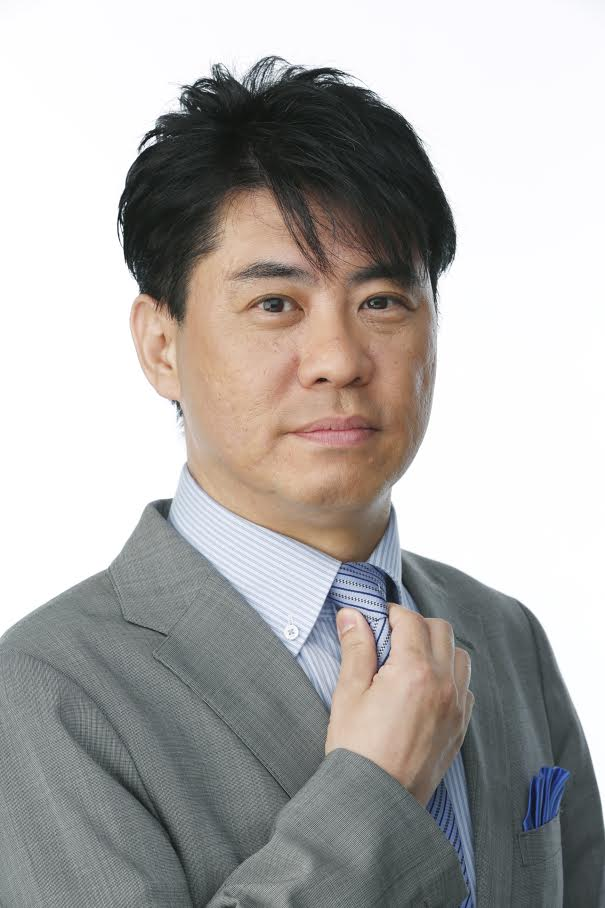
- Born: Kosuke Takahashi; 1968 (age 57–58); Kawasaki, Kanagawa, Japan
- Occupations: journalist, TV commentator

YouTube information
- Channel: Journalist Takahashi Kosuke's "Message to the Wolves"
- Years active: August 3, 2010 - present
- Genres: International affairs; news; politics; military; defense
- Subscribers: 7.270
- Views: 3,148,5132
- Last updated: September 17, 2026
- Website: www.kosuke.net

Kosuke Takahashi (高橋 浩祐, Takahashi Kōsuke; born October 13, 1968 in Kawasaki, Kanagawa) is a Japanese journalist. He contributes to IHS Jane's Defence, NK News, and Toyo Keizai Online among other media by writing in both English and Japanese. He is also currently a regular TV commentator of Tokyo MX's Morning Cross program.

Takahashi worked as the senior online news editor at Thomson Reuters in Tokyo from April 2016 to January 2017, where he focuses on expanding its online news coverage across multiple digital channels. He was appointed editor-in-chief of The Huffington Post Japan in September 2014 where he was in charge of overseeing all of the day-to-day editorial content and operations of the Huffington Post Japan. Previously, he has worked as Tokyo correspondent for IHS Jane's Defence Weekly from January 2009 to early September 2014, specializing in Japan's defense and politics as well as East Asian affairs such as on Sino-Japanese relations and Korean Peninsula issues. He also has worked for the Asahi Shimbun, Bloomberg News, Dow Jones Japan and The Wall Street Journal Japan as staff writer/editor, and Nikkei CNBC Japan as regular TV commentator. He used the pen name Kosuke Goto (後藤 浩祐, Goto Kosuke) at Bloomberg.

His work has appeared in the International Herald Tribune, The Guardian, The Straits Times, Institutional Investor magazine, Asia Times Online, The Diplomat, NK News and Japan's Tokyo Keizai magazine, among other publications.

His comments on international affairs have appeared in worldwide articles such as those of the Christian Science Monitor, the Australian, Italy's daily newspaper Il Foglio, the Taipei Times, the Ukrainian Week, China's Xinhua News Agency and South Korea's JoongAng Ilbo.

The news media Takahashi has worked for:

- Tokyo Correspondent for The Diplomat, May 2023– Present
- Tokyo Correspondent for Janes Defence Weekly, January 2017– April 2023
- Senior Online News Editor of Thomson Reuters, April 1, 2016– January 2017
- Editor-in-chief of The Huffington Post Japan, September 8, 2014– March 14, 2016
- Tokyo Correspondent for IHS Jane's Defence Weekly, January 2009– September 7, 2014
- Editor at Wall Street Journal Japan, Oct 2012 - Dec 2013
- Senior Writer at Asia Times Online, May 2004– Sept 2012
- TV Commentator at Nikkei CNBC Japan, March 2009– March 2012 (under his pen name Kosuke Goto)
- Freelancer for Institutional Investor Magazine, January 2009–December 2010
- Staff Writer at Bloomberg News, July 2005 - Sept 2008 (under his pen name Kosuke Goto)
- Staff Writer at RIM Intelligence Co, Feb 2004 - May 2005
- Intern at the Tokyo bureau of The New York Times, May- July, 2002
- Copy Editor at Dow Jones Japan, 2000–2001
- Staff Writer at The Asahi Shimbun, 1993–1999

Takahashi graduated from Keio University with a B.A. in economics in 1993. After working for The Asahi Shimbun and Dow Jones, he studied at Columbia University's Journalism School and School of International and Public Affairs (SIPA), and graduated with Master of Science in Journalism in 2003 and Master of International Affairs in 2004. Prior to joining the Asahi as a reporter in 1993, he worked for Baltimore Economic Development Corporation as an exchange trainee to a sister city program of Kawasaki City, and researched trade issues between the United States and Japan. He was awarded an Honorary citizenship of Baltimore for his work in 1988.
