= Jay Lefkowitz =

American lawyer (born 1962)

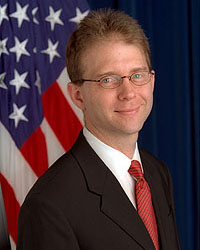
- Lefkowitz in 2005

United States Special Envoy for Human Rights in North Korea
- In office August 19, 2005 – January 20, 2009
- President: George W. Bush
- Preceded by: Position established
- Succeeded by: Robert R. King

Personal details
- Born: Jay Philip Lefkowitz; November 20, 1962 (age 63) New York City, New York, U.S.
- Spouse: Elena (m. 1991)
- Children: 3
- Education: Columbia University (BA); Columbia Law School (JD)
- Occupation: Lawyer; government official
- Website: www.jaylefkowitz.com

Jay Lefkowitz (born 20 November 1962) is an American lawyer. For more than three decades, he was a litigation partner at the Kirkland & Ellis law firm, where he was also a member of the worldwide management committee. He served in both Bush administrations, including as Deputy Assistant to the President for Domestic Policy under George W. Bush, and from 2005 to 2009 was the first Special Envoy for Human Rights in North Korea. In 2006, he was part of the legal team who represented Jeffrey Epstein, and engaged in negotiations with Alexander Acosta to secure Epstein's 2008 federal non-prosecution agreement.

== Early life and education ==
Lefkowitz was born in New York City, New York, in 1962. His father who was a lawyer, spoke to him only in Hebrew during his early childhood. He was educated at Jewish day schools, graduating from the Hebrew Academy of the Capital District in a class of seven students, and completed his secondary education with a program at Bar-Ilan University in Israel.

At Columbia College, Lefkowitz won the James A. Beard Political Science Prize in 1984 and spent a semester of his senior year in the Supreme Court's internship program. He received his B.A. in history in 1984 and his J.D. from Columbia Law School in 1987, where he was named a Harlan Fiske Stone Scholar.

As a student and young lawyer, Lefkowitz was active in the Soviet Jewry movement, participating in demonstrations in Washington and outside the United Nations and traveling to the Soviet Union to meet with refuseniks.

== Career ==
After law school he joined Paul, Weiss, Rifkind, Wharton & Garrison, where he worked closely with senior partner Morris Abram, then president of the National Conference on Soviet Jewry—a continuation of his earlier involvement in the movement—frequently serving as Abram's speechwriter. Abram introduced Lefkowitz to then–Vice President George H. W. Bush in 1987, beginning his association with the Bush family. He served as deputy director of Victory '88 during the 1988 presidential campaign.

=== George H. W. Bush administration ===
Lefkowitz served as deputy executive secretary to the Domestic Policy Council and then as director of cabinet affairs for President George H. W. Bush.

In 1992, he pushed for implementation of Communications Workers of America v. Beck, which Bush addressed by executive order that April; Lefkowitz was one of the advisers sustaining the president's domestic agenda.

In 1990, he was a public member of the U.S. delegation to the United Nations Human Rights Commission in Geneva, where he delivered a speech criticizing Iran over its fatwa against the writer Salman Rushdie.

=== Private practice ===
After the Clinton administration took office in January 1993, Lefkowitz spent about nine months at the American Enterprise Institute working with William Kristol on a project funded by the Lynde and Harry Bradley Foundation. He returned to private practice in late 1993, joining Kirkland & Ellis.

=== George W. Bush administration ===
Lefkowitz served as general counsel of the Office of Management and Budget and later as Deputy Assistant to the President for Domestic Policy. In April 2002, The Washington Post profiled him as the administration's domestic policy "point man," describing his path from hard-nosed commercial litigator to senior White House adviser.

He was credited as the architect of Bush's 2001 decision to permit limited federal funding for research using human embryonic stem cells. In his memoir Decision Points, Bush recounted that during the deliberations Lefkowitz read aloud to him in the Oval Office from Aldous Huxley's dystopian novel Brave New World, a moment Bush cited among the influences on his thinking about the ethical limits of biotechnology.

Following the September 11 attacks, Lefkowitz served as the White House architect of the September 11th Victim Compensation Fund, where he worked closely with Kenneth Feinberg, the fund's special master; Feinberg later described him as the fund's "secret weapon." By the end of 2003, ninety-seven percent of eligible families had opted into the fund rather than pursue litigation.

He was also closely involved in the development of the President's Emergency Plan for AIDS Relief (PEPFAR). As deputy assistant to the president for domestic policy, Lefkowitz was part of the small White House working group that designed the program, with many of its planning meetings held in his West Wing office.

He was given responsibility for the search that led to the appointment of Joseph O'Neill to run the White House Office of National AIDS Policy, and worked with deputy national security adviser Gary Edson on the program's architecture—including the decision to house it in the State Department under a single coordinator accountable to the president.

After leaving the White House in 2003, he was twice offered West Wing jobs. Lefkowitz returned to Kirkland & Ellis, joining the firm's New York office. Lefkowitz remained at the firm until March 2026, when he announced his retirement after roughly three decades.

=== North Korea ===
On August 19, 2005, President Bush appointed Lefkowitz the first Special Envoy for Human Rights in North Korea, a position created by the North Korean Human Rights Act of 2004. He held the post part-time while continuing his law practice in New York, serving until the end of the Bush administration in January 2009.

As envoy for North Korean human rights (2005–2009), Lefkowitz referred to the North Korean government as a "deeply oppressive nation". He criticized the creation of the Kaesong Industrial Region as exploitative, since it failed to bring true economic reform to North Korea and allowed South Korean corporations to pay North Korean workers as little as $2 a day.

He expanded on these criticisms in an April 2006 Wall Street Journal op-ed, raising concerns about worker exploitation at Kaesong, including wages paid indirectly through the North Korean state. The article prompted a South Korean official to publicly warn him against interfering in domestic affairs.

During his tenure, U.S. funding for Korean-language broadcasting by Radio Free Asia and Voice of America doubled, from $4 million in fiscal year 2006 to $8.1 million in fiscal year 2008, expanding broadcasts into North Korea to ten hours per day. The first North Korean refugees were admitted to the United States under the 2004 Act.

==== Advocacy for linking human rights and security ====
In a January 2008 speech at the American Enterprise Institute, Lefkowitz called for a revised approach to North Korea, arguing that Pyongyang was not seriously pursuing timely denuclearization and that human rights and security should be treated as inseparable elements of United States policy. He described North Korea as a "serial proliferator" and urged China and South Korea to exert greater pressure on its government.

Secretary of State Condoleezza Rice publicly rejected Lefkowitz's assessment, stating that he was not involved in the six-party negotiations.

Lefkowitz's position nevertheless received prominent support. Washington Post columnist Michael Gerson wrote that Lefkowitz had stated the obvious about North Korea's unwillingness to disarm and reported that State Department officials had attempted to limit his involvement in policy discussions and soften the department's reporting on North Korean human rights abuses.

The Wall Street Journal's editorial board also defended him after Rice's public rebuke, framing his American Enterprise Institute speech as unwelcome truth-telling and portraying the administration's diplomacy as a failing exchange in which Pyongyang won concessions at no cost to itself. Concluding that Rice's approach had produced no results, the editorial argued that "Mr. Bush would do better to listen to Mr. Lefkowitz," and—answering Rice's suggestion that Chinese and Russian officials would not recognize his name—proposed that she be the one to introduce him.

Lefkowitz continued to press for a stronger human rights focus, later describing freedom for North Koreans as a "pragmatic security necessity" for the United States. He remained special envoy until the end of the Bush administration.

==== Final report ====
In his final report to Congress, submitted on January 17, 2009, Lefkowitz presented a case for treating North Korea's human rights abuses as a concern of both morality and national security. Comparing the scale of such abuses with historical atrocities including the Holocaust, the Cambodian killing fields, and the Katyn and Srebrenica massacres, he recommended making human rights a permanent component of negotiations with North Korea, modeled on the linkage between security and human rights established by the Helsinki Accords.

Lefkowitz argued that raising human rights need not impede security diplomacy, noting that North Korea had returned to negotiations shortly after President George W. Bush publicly met with North Korean defector Kang Chul-hwan in 2005.

The report also criticized delays in the processing of North Korean refugees by the Department of Homeland Security, observing that only 67 North Korean refugees had been resettled in the United States through the end of 2008, while South Korea was by then admitting approximately 2,500 per year.

The post remained vacant after Lefkowitz's departure until November 2009, when Robert R. King, nominated by President Barack Obama and confirmed by the Senate, was sworn in as Special Envoy for North Korean Human Rights Issues.

== Notable litigation ==
=== Jackson v Benson ===
In 1998, Lefkowitz argued Jackson v. Benson before the Wisconsin Supreme Court on behalf of the state, defending the expansion of the Milwaukee Parental Choice Program—the first modern private school voucher program in the United States—to include religious schools. The court upheld the program, and the U.S. Supreme Court declined to review the decision.

=== PLIVA, Inc. v. Mensing ===
In two major cases before the Supreme Court of the United States, PLIVA, Inc. v. Mensing, 564 U.S. 604 (2011), and Mutual Pharmaceutical Co. v. Bartlett, 570 U.S. 472 (2013), as lead trial and appellate counsel Lefkowitz succeeded in persuading the Supreme Court that because federal law absolutely demands that generic drugs precisely follow the FDA-approved labels of the related brand-name drug produced by another manufacturer, states may not impose liability on generic manufacturers who do nothing but use the labels federal law requires them to use. Both cases were decided 5–4.

=== Teva Pharmaceuticals ===
Lefkowitz represented Teva in the Lamictal direct purchaser antitrust litigation, winning dismissal in December 2012 of a proposed class action alleging that a settlement between Teva and GlaxoSmithKline was an anticompetitive pay-for-delay agreement, for which The American Lawyer named him Lawyer of the Week.

=== Corber v. Xanodyne Pharmaceuticals Inc ===
In Corber v. Xanodyne Pharmaceuticals Inc., the United States Court of Appeals for the Ninth Circuit, sitting en banc, ruled in favor of Lefkowitz's client, Teva Pharmaceuticals. Hundreds of plaintiffs had brought actions against Teva in various California state courts and had asked that the cases be coordinated before one state court judge "for all purposes."

=== Class Action Fairness Act ===
The defendants sought to remove the cases to federal court pursuant to the Class Action Fairness Act ("CAFA"), on the ground that the plaintiffs had proposed a joint trial. But the District Court and a three-judge panel of the Ninth Circuit held that the cases were not removable because the plaintiffs had not explicitly asked that the cases be tried together, which is essential to the definition of a removable "mass action" under CAFA. The Ninth Circuit granted en banc review and ruled in favor of Lefkowitz's client, that the plaintiffs' request for coordination "for all purposes" necessarily encompassed a request for a joint trial. Hence, the case was properly removed to federal court.

=== Association for Accessible Medicines v. Frosh ===
In Association for Accessible Medicines v. Frosh, Lefkowitz secured a major victory on behalf of his client in the United States Court of Appeals for the Fourth Circuit. During its 2017 legislative session, the Maryland General Assembly had passed a law prohibiting a manufacturer or wholesale distributor from "engag[ing] in price gouging in the sale of an essential off-patent or generic drug." Md. Code Ann. Health Genera; § 2-802(a). The Court ruled that the statute violated the Commerce Clause of the United States Constitution because a state may not regulate transactions that occur completely out of that state. In the case of the Maryland statute, the state statute was impermissibly regulating transactions between manufacturers and distributors that took place wholly outside of Maryland.

=== Columbia University v. Trump Administration ===
In 2025, Lefkowitz, alongside then Kirkland & Ellis colleague Matt Owen, was retained by Columbia University and negotiated the settlement agreement between Columbia University and the Trump administration after Trump froze $400 million in grants to the university.

=== Jeffrey Epstein ===
In 2006, Lefkowitz was part of the team of lawyers who represented Jeffrey Epstein in negotiations with Alexander Acosta, then U.S. Attorney for the Southern District of Florida and formerly an associate at Kirkland & Ellis, resulting in Epstein's 2008 federal non-prosecution agreement.

In 2019, The Wall Street Journal reported on the extent of Lefkowitz's work for Epstein, including efforts by Epstein's defense team to challenge allegations made by Florida police and to argue that Epstein was not a "typical" sex offender.

According to The Miami Herald, after meeting with Acosta for negotiations, Lefkowitz emailed him to thank him, and mentioned that he hoped Acosta would keep his promise to keep the deal secret. Lefkowitz also exchanged many emails with the lead federal prosecutor in the case, A. Marie Villafaña, in which they often discussed ways to limit press coverage of the case.

In 2026, included among the documents released by the Department of Justice were email exchanges between Epstein and Lefkowitz. In September 2011, Lefkowitz invited Epstein to attend his son’s bar mitzvah in Jerusalem; Epstein said he was unable to attend.

== Notable pro bono representation ==
Lefkowitz has been deeply involved in the pro bono representation of New York parents who assert that the teacher-tenure system in place has led to inadequate education for countless students across the State because it often precludes dismissal of ineffective teachers. In 2018, a New York appellate court ruled that the case could go on, rejecting the State's argument that some changes the New York State Legislature had enacted necessarily served to solve the problems.

Following that decision, Lefkowitz said that New York's constitution guarantees every child in the state a sound basic education and that the existing teacher employment statutes were "failing our children by keeping ineffective teachers" in public schools, adding that the ruling would allow the plaintiffs to obtain evidence from the State.

In 2013–14, Lefkowitz provided pro bono representation to a group of Hassidic storekeepers who had posted signs on their stores with a dress code involving modest clothing. The New York City Commission on Human Rights imposed significant daily fines on the storekeepers, asserting that the dress code constituted gender-based discrimination even though it applied to both men and women, and even though dress codes that actually do distinguish between genders are prevalent in many settings, including the courts and restaurants.

On the eve of trial, following a ruling in the storekeepers' favor by the administrative judge, the Commission agreed to abandon its efforts to prosecute the storeowners.

== Academic positions ==
Lefkowitz has taught at Columbia Law School since at least 2010, where he serves as a lecturer in law. He has taught a seminar on the Supreme Court that uses a simulation method whereby students act in the roles of Supreme Court justices, hearing arguments and writing opinions in cases pending before the Court. He has also taught a course on presidential decision-making and administrative law.

He is a member of the visiting faculty of the Tikvah Fund, an educational foundation focused on Jewish thought and leadership.

== Writings ==
Lefkowitz has written widely on law and public policy for The Wall Street Journal, Commentary, the Jewish Review of Books, among others.

In 2014, Lefkowitz authored an article for Commentary titled "The Rise of Social Orthodoxy: A Personal Account." The article describes a phenomenon in which some adherents of Jewish modern orthodoxy are motivated to adhere to certain ritual practices by a strong desire to belong to a social group with traditions, as opposed to being motivated by a commitment to abide by God's commandments and demands. Indeed, some members of the group, even those who pray regularly, may not even believe in a God who issues such decrees.

The article triggered considerable critical response from some Orthodox rabbis and leaders. Commentary published a series of letters about the article, accompanied by Lefkowitz's response to each letter.

In 2009, Lefkowitz authored an article in Commentary titled "AIDS and the President—An Inside Account." Based on his service as deputy domestic policy adviser to President George W. Bush, Lefkowitz provided an account of the events leading to the United States making financial contributions of an unprecedented scope to the international fight against AIDS.

Rebutting claims that President George W. Bush was making token contributions just for show, Lefkowitz describes his observations of the President's deep moral commitment to fighting the epidemic, even to the point of providing funding to organizations that also perform abortions—something that drew bitter opposition from some core conservative groups.

Lefkowitz has continued to write regularly in recent years, principally for Commentary, where he has published a series of analyses of Jewish voting patterns in American presidential elections, including "The Jewish Vote in 2024." He has also contributed essays and reviews to the Jewish Review of Books, including a review of Dennis Ross's Doomed to Succeed on the history of the U.S.–Israel relationship across successive presidencies.

== Recognition ==
In 2004, Lefkowitz represented the United States at the International Conference on Anti-Semitism in Berlin, sponsored by the Organization for Security and Co-operation in Europe. In May 2008, President George W. Bush appointed him to the honorary delegation accompanying the president to Jerusalem for the celebration of the 60th anniversary of the State of Israel.

In December 2012, he was named Lawyer of the Week by The American Lawyer. In 2013, he was named as one of "The 100 Most Influential Lawyers in America".

He was named a Law360 "MVP of the Year" in 2011 for his appellate practice and in 2012, 2013, 2014, 2015 and 2016 for his life sciences work, one of three of the 189 MVPs named to the list six years in a row.

Kirkland & Ellis's litigation department, in which Lefkowitz was a senior partner, was named The American Lawyer's Litigation Department of the Year in January 2008.

Lefkowitz has received the Judge Joseph M. Proskauer Award from the UJA-Federation of New York (2019), the Gershom Mendes Seixas Award from Columbia/Barnard Hillel (2010), and the Public Service Award from the Orthodox Union (2004).

He was ranked by The Legal 500 U.S. and Chambers USA and recognized by Best Lawyers in product liability litigation.

== Boards and affiliations ==
Lefkowitz has served on the boards of several organizations connected to his professional and communal interests. He has been a trustee of the Tikvah Fund, a foundation supporting Jewish thought, education, and leadership, where he has also taught as a member of its visiting faculty.

He has also served on the board of directors of Commentary, the monthly magazine of politics and Jewish affairs to which he has been a frequent contributor, and on the advisory boards of the Manhattan Institute, a New York–based public policy think tank, and of Columbia/Barnard Hillel, the Jewish student organization at his alma mater.

== Personal life ==
Lefkowitz is an Orthodox Jew. He married Elena, a journalist who later became a documentary film producer, in 1991. They have three children and live in New York.

His Shabbat observance was accommodated during his White House service. For a White House dinner honoring the U.S. Holocaust Memorial Museum, Laura Bush arranged kosher catering and the purchase of new china so that observant guests could dine from the same service—reportedly the first formal dinner in the State Dining Room held without the White House china.

== Climbing ==
Lefkowitz is an avid rock and alpine climber with extensive climbing experience in the United States and Europe. Lefkowitz is featured in the documentary Looking Up, directed by his wife Elena Neuman. The film follows Eitan Armon, a young Israeli climber who, after losing approximately 95 percent of his vision to retinitis pigmentosa, sets out to climb El Capitan. Neuman has said the project began as a promotional video and became a feature film after Lefkowitz, who had previously climbed El Capitan by another route and was planning to climb the Zodiac route, invited Armon to join him. Looking Up premiered at the Miami Jewish Film Festival in January 2025 and screened at roughly twenty festivals; Neuman received the 2025 New York Women in Film and Television Award for Excellence in Documentary Directing for the film. Lefkowitz has also helped develop several new rock-climbing routes in Colorado, particularly around Independence Pass. Mountain Project credits him as a first ascensionist of Jay’s Arete and Hot Tamale.

== Selected works ==
- Lefkowitz, Jay P. (April 28, 2006). "Freedom for All Koreans". The Wall Street Journal.
- Lefkowitz, Jay P. (January 2008). "Stem Cells and the President—An Inside Account". Commentary.
- Lefkowitz, Jay P. (January 2009). "AIDS and the President—An Inside Account". Commentary.
- Lefkowitz, Jay P. (April 12, 2013). "U.S. Response to North Korea's Rhetoric Is Dangerously Naive". The Washington Post.
- Lefkowitz, Jay P. (April 2014). "The Rise of Social Orthodoxy: A Personal Account". Commentary.
- Lefkowitz, Jay P. (January 2025). "The Jewish Vote in 2024". Commentary.

Political offices
New title	United States Special Envoy for Human Rights in North Korea; 2005–2009	Succeeded by Robert R. King
