= NK News =

American news website about North Korea

- Website type: News website
- Available in: English
- Founded: April 2010; 16 years ago
- Owners: NK Consulting, Inc.
- CEO: Chad O'Carroll
- Website: www.nknews.org
- Commercial: Yes
- Registration: Optional
- Launched: 2011
- Current status: Active

NK News is an American subscription-based news website that provides stories and analysis about North Korea. The organization's main bureau is in Seoul, South Korea, with reporters in Washington, D.C., and London. Reporting is based on information collected from in-country sources, recently returned western visitors to North Korea, stories filed by the Korean Central News Agency (KCNA), interviews with defectors, and reports published by NGOs and western governments. The site's founder and Managing Director is Chad O'Carroll, a former employee of the German Marshall Fund, who has written on North Korea and North Korea issues for The Daily Telegraph.

== Regular features ==
- Ask a North Korean: a forum whereby readers can submit questions about daily life in North Korea which are answered by a panel of four defectors. The column covering Jang Song-thaek's execution received particular attention.
- Expert Survey: in which various Korean and Western experts on the politics, economics and history of North Korea provide answers to a questionnaire covering various aspects of North Korea's current situation and future prospects.
- Defector Survey: asking various North Korean defectors about daily life inside North Korea and their opinions on subjects such as tourism in North Korea, foreign aid and the things that defectors miss most after leaving.

== Subscription ==
NK News' sister platform, NK Pro, goes beyond the function of a news outlet and also provides subscription-based data analysis tools designed for use by experts and analysts in public and private sector research and analysis postings. These tools include the North Korea Leadership Tracker, the North Korea Ship Tracker, the North Korea Aviation Tracker, Leading Indicators, and KCNA Watch. Free of charge, KCNA Watch allows users to watch both archives and live streams of Korean Central Television.

== Media coverage ==
NK News gained international headlines in November 2012 for its "North Korean Leadership Tracker," which presents a graphic visualization of every event Kim Jong Il and his son Kim Jong Un have attended since 1994. The following year, NK News was credited with breaking news of a purported North Korean "strike plan" against U.S. targets, based on analysis of a photo published by North Korean media, and the site was subsequently named by KTXL news anchor Paul Robins as his "pick of the day."

Other scoops include the identification of Kim Jong Un's US$7 million yacht and images proving the date of the 2014 Pyongyang apartment collapse. NK News stories have been cited by USA Today, Österreich, Business Insider, and others.

Since 2014, NK News also operates a content syndication agreement with The Guardian, with various articles being published on The Guardian NK website.

== Controversies ==
In early 2014, NK News was partially blocked by the government of South Korea, ostensibly for violating the nation's National Security Law, a censorship regulation that prohibits some reports originating from North Korea.

In November 2014, NK News published a series of accusations by the former Associated Press stringer Nate Thayer, suggesting that the AP bureau in Pyongyang had signed secret agreements with the North Korean government that compromised its journalistic independence and integrity. AP denied the reports, and said that Thayer was merely a disgruntled former employee.

NK News has been accused of being a front for the Central Intelligence Agency by members of the Korean Friendship Association, which is a Spain-based friendship association with North Korea.

KCNA Watch, a sister site of NK News, has been criticized for providing incomplete archives of North Korean websites in comparison to those of the Internet Archive's Wayback Machine and web caches of various search engines.

In March 2025, North Korean state media accused NK News and its sister sites of claimed copyright infringement of websites run by North Korea and Chongryon.

== Journalists ==
Japanese journalist Kosuke Takahashi is a contributor to the site.

Alek Sigley, an Australian national who was a graduate student of Korean literature at Kim Il Sung University, contributed articles about daily life in Pyongyang. In June 2019, Sigley was detained and deported after being accused of espionage. The following year, he would go on to deny these charges and claimed that his confession was coerced.

== See also ==
- Media coverage of North Korea
- Daily NK
