= Alí Lameda =

Venezuelan politician once imprisoned in North Korea

- Born: June 12, 1924; Carora, Venezuela
- Died: November 30, 1995 (aged 71); Caracas, Venezuela
- Occupations: Translator and poet
- Known for: Imprisonment in North Korea
- Political party: Communist Party of Venezuela

Alí Lameda (June 12, 1924 — November 30, 1995) was a Venezuelan poet and translator who was once imprisoned in a North Korean concentration camp for seven years.

== Biography ==
He was born in Carora in the state of Lara. His youth was influenced (politically and intellectually) by his teacher and friend Cheo Zubillaga. After graduating, Lameda traveled to Colombia to study medicine. He returned to Venezuela a few years later and joined the Venezuelan Communist Party. He then went to Czechoslovakia, where he lived five years. There he studied the Czech language and translated works by Czech and French writers.

In 1965, while in East Berlin, he came into contact with North Koreans and became fascinated with the stories about their country. In the middle of the following year, he arrived in Pyongyang to work as an interpreter in the Spanish section of the Foreign Publications Department, within the Korean Ministry of Foreign Affairs. He personally met Kim Il-sung and Foreign Minister Pak Song-chol. His work dealt with the translation from English to Spanish. The department was joined by the Frenchman Jacques Sédillot, who in turn translated propaganda from English into French. They quickly became friends. Shortly after, a German woman, Elvira Tanzer, arrived in Pyongyang, who was romantically linked to Ali. However, shortly after the beginning of his work, Lameda, in private correspondence, began to criticise the prevailing system in North Korea, emphasising the state of poverty in which the population of most of the north lived.

In September 1967, during a banquet honouring the department's employees, he told several jokes, which were allusions to Kim Il-sung. Three days later, he was arrested by the security service and detained in the cell of the Ministry of the Interior. In a 1975 interview with El Nacional, Lameda expressed that his arrest could also have been the product of pressure from the Cuban Communist Party after the Venezuelan Communist Party decided to accept pacification and abandon its weapons.

In prison, he was subjected to torture: he was interrogated for 12 hours without interruption, he was beaten and left without food for long periods. He spent a year in prison. After this time, he was placed under house arrest. He was then assured that he could leave the country, but not before saying goodbye to his partner Elvira at the airport, but shortly after saying goodbye to her, Lameda was again arrested and put on trial. The trial lasted one day, after which Alí Lameda was sentenced to 20 years of hard work. He was sent to one of the concentration camps (called a re-education camp) for 7 years.

He was tortured in the concentration camp, including having to sit in one place every day for several hours. The official translation says that in this way the prisoner "must examine his conscience." During his stay he met a foreigner who claimed to be a Frenchman named Pierre. Due to poor conditions, lack of food and heat, and sitting for long periods of time in a fixed position every day, he suffered paralysis in his left leg. He lost more than 20 kilograms, and a tumor appeared on his back. He constantly suffered from diarrhea and fever. Through conversations between prisoners and guards, he learned that there were almost 20 camps across the country and nearly 150,000 people had been imprisoned.

During a visit to Caracas by the then Romanian president Nicolae Ceaușescu, the then Venezuelan president Rafael Caldera made a request to him to mediate for the release of Lameda. Similarly, the Venezuelan socialist leader Pompeyo Márquez in a meeting with Ceaușescu also advocated for his release, so Ceaușescu would begin to manage his case, immediately improving his condition. However, his release took place in 1974 when it served in itself as a requirement requested by former president Carlos Andrés Pérez. Likewise, the Communist Party of Venezuela was another important promoter of his liberation.

In 1973, North Korea sought allies in order to join the United Nations. Venezuela agreed to the proposal with the condition that Lameda be released. He was finally freed on September 27, 1974, seven years after the verdict. Ali was allowed to leave North Korea through an alliance between Pyongyang and Bucharest. According to historian Moe Taylor, Lameda's release was a result of Ceaușescu's personal intervention, Venezuelan government's efforts, as well as the support of Ahmed Sékou Touré, the president of Guinea.

Back in Berlin, he had surgery on the tumor and his leg. After coming back to Venezuela in 1974, Lameda became critical of the Venezuelan radical left, dismayed by its admiration for Juche. He denounced Juche as something "which deep down is nothing more than a very bland, mediocre and hollow lucubration" and described Kim Il Sung as "the opulent and plump communist boss, horny, bow-legged, of tanned skin and already half-blind". He also claimed that women are oppressed in North Korea, and that women were sent to prison for smoking. He also stated that North Korean television allocated roughly half of the broadcasting time to films about Kim Il Sung. Taylor wrote: "In the end, the most salient explanation as to why North Korea remained in high esteem within the Latin American Left in the 1960s and throughout the Cold War is the fact that the experiences of Lameda, Murillo, and others were rare exceptions. Thousands of foreigners visited North Korea in the same period, and many testified to a remarkable model of socialism for the global South."

At the end of December 1974, he left Venezuela and lived in London with his Venezuelan family. After his release, he worked as a cultural attaché in the Venezuelan embassies in Prague, Asunción and Athens.

In later years, Lameda stated that he was targeted by North Korean security because he did not conceal his criticism of the Kim personality cult, as he "grew irritated by the constant fanatical praise of Kim, and the superhuman feats attributed to him". Lameda stated that he had to routinely returgigate unbelievable claims about Kim Il Sung during his work as a translator, such as that Kim marched 80,000 kilometres or founded the Union to Overthrow Imperialism at the age of twelve. Given that the North Korean director of the Department of Foreign Publications was also arrested and imprisoned, Lameda believed that his case was not isolated but was a part of a larger alleged conspiracy that North Koreans believed to exist amongst their foreign translators. Taylor connected the fate of Lameda and his colleagues to geopolitical tensions:

How should we make sense of these events? In 1967, North Korea was essentially on a war footing. Since October 1966, Pyongyang had sharply escalated aggressive military actions against South Korea and US forces stationed there. The arrests of Lameda, Murillo, and Sedillot ccurred four months after the purge of the Gapsan faction at the WPK Fifteenth Plenum, and four months before the Blue House raid and the capture of the USS Pueblo. A January 1968 report from the East German embassy in Pyongyang reported that the North Korean government, convinced that war was imminent, had tightened restrictions on internal travel, and was resettling large segments of Pyongyang’s population to the countryside and relocating vital factories. It appears, therefore, that Lameda, Murillo, and others were the victims of the paranoia and obsession with fifth columns and foreign infiltration that often accompanies times of war, especially when a ruling group feels vulnerable and under siege. It is also likely that their ordeals were collateral damage from Kim’s moves to eliminate potential rivals within the WPK leadership and the intensification of his personality cult in the same period. The need to construct new, increasingly fantastic narratives around Kim, while erasing all references of his defeated rivals, inevitably put many working in the state propaganda apparatus in a precarious position.

Lameda died on November 30, 1995, in the city of Caracas.

== See also ==
- List of foreign nationals detained in North Korea
