= Matthew Todd Miller =

U.S. citizen formerly detained in North Korea

- Born: August 26, 1989 (age 37); Bakersfield, California U.S.
- Occupation: English teacher

Detainment
- Country: North Korea
- Detained: April 10, 2014
- Released: November 8, 2014
- Days in detention: 212
- Sentence: Six years of hard labor
- Likely reason for detention: Acts hostile to the DPRK while entering under the guise of a tourist.

Matthew Todd Miller (born August 26, 1989) is a U.S. citizen who was detained in North Korea (DPRK) after traveling there, tearing up his tourist visa, and requesting political asylum. He refused to be sent back, intending to get arrested to "have a face-to-face with North Koreans to answer [his] personal questions".

He was sentenced to six years of hard labor on September 14, 2014, for committing "acts hostile to the DPRK while entering under the guise of a tourist." He was released, along with Kenneth Bae, on November 8, 2014.

== Early life ==
Matthew Todd Miller was raised in Bakersfield, California. He is the youngest of four sons of Bill and K.C. Miller, both petroleum engineers, and is a 2008 graduate of Bakersfield High School. The Associated Press reported that Miller went to South Korea in 2010 to visit one of his brothers, an F-35 test pilot, who was stationed there at the time with the United States Air Force. Miller took a job teaching English and had learned some Korean in the process.

== Detention in North Korea ==
According to North Korean state-run media, Miller entered North Korea alone on April 10, 2014, on a tourist visa arranged by US-based tour operator Uri Tours. Initial reports said that he tore up the visa upon arrival at the airport and declared his intent to seek political asylum. He was arrested for "unruly behaviour".

Speaking from an undisclosed location in North Korea on August 1, 2014, Miller was permitted to give interviews to two American news organizations. He told reporters that he was being treated well while in custody, though the Associated Press noted the possibility that his comments may have been coerced. He stated he was expecting to be tried imminently, and asked the United States government to send an envoy to intervene on his behalf.

=== Conviction ===
Miller was charged under Article 64 of the North Korean criminal code concerning acts of espionage, and was put on trial on September 14, 2014. He was swiftly convicted and sentenced to six years of hard labor (euphemistically termed "labor re-education") for committing "hostile acts". Miller had no lawyer during the 90-minute hearing, described as a "show trial" by The Washington Post, and authorities indicated that there was no possibility of appeal.

Although earlier reports indicated that Miller sought political asylum in North Korea, the prosecution argued that this was a ruse intended to disguise Miller's real intention of committing espionage. According to the court, Miller admitted to having the "wild ambition" of experiencing conditions in prison to secretly investigate and expose the country's dim human rights situation. Miller later revealed that he was curious about the country and simply wanted to talk to North Korean people and ask them questions beyond what he could as a tourist. According to Miller, he achieved his goal while imprisoned. Nevertheless, Miller says when he issued an apology as part of the court process, he did so with sincerity.

=== Release ===
On November 8, 2014, Miller was released after seven months in North Korea, and allowed to leave along with one additional American prisoner, Kenneth Bae, thanks to an intervention by James Clapper, the Director of National Intelligence.

== Aftermath ==
After returning to the U.S., Miller told reporters he went to North Korea intending to get arrested, stating that "My main fear was that they would not arrest me when I arrived". Initially North Korean authorities had refused to arrest him and sought to return him on the next flight, but Miller refused. Miller had brought a notebook into North Korea incorrectly claiming he was a computer hacker involved with WikiLeaks and having attempted to access files at U.S. military bases in South Korea. He later assessed that this material was never taken seriously by the North Korean authorities, prompting them to ask him the real reasons behind his visit.

== See also ==
- Human rights in North Korea
- List of foreign nationals detained in North Korea
