= Robert R. King =

American Mormon missionary (born 1942)

Robert King
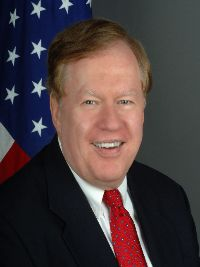

United States Special Envoy for North Korean Human Rights Issues
- In office November 24, 2009 – January 12, 2017
- President: Barack Obama
- Preceded by: Jay Lefkowitz
- Succeeded by: Julie Turner (2023)

Personal details
- Born: June 8, 1942 (age 84) Wyoming, U.S.
- Education: Brigham Young University; Tufts University

Robert R. "Bob" King (born June 8, 1942) is an American diplomat. He was nominated in September 2009 by President Barack Obama and confirmed by the United States Senate in November 2009, to serve as United States special envoy for North Korean Human Rights Issues, an ambassadorial ranked position.

== Life and career ==
King is a native of Wyoming. King holds a bachelor's degree from Brigham Young University and a Ph.D. from The Fletcher School of Law and Diplomacy at Tufts University. He worked for 24 years as the chief of staff to congressman Tom Lantos (along with his wife Kay) and at the same time Democratic Staff Director of the House Foreign Affairs Committee (2001–2009). Earlier he was Assistant Director of Research at Radio Free Europe in Munich, Germany, and as a White House Fellow (National Security staff), a member of the National Security Council Staff in the Carter Administration.

While working for Radio Free Europe in Germany, he proposed returning the Holy Crown of Hungary to Hungary to help improve relations with that nation in a mock memo as part of his application to work in a White House Fellow for the Carter Administration. Upon being accepted, doing so became part of his responsibilities.

King is the author of five books and some 40 articles on international relations topics. King received the Knight’s Cross Order of Merit of the Republic of Hungary. He is a Latter-day Saint and served from 1961 to 1963 as a missionary in the New England Mission of the LDS Church.

King and his wife Kay are the parents of three children. He is also a member of the Council on Foreign Relations.

== See also ==
- United States Special Representative for North Korea Policy

Political offices
Preceded by Jay Lefkowitz	United States Special Envoy for North Korean Human Rights Issues; 2009–2017	Succeeded by Julie Turner
