= Merrill Newman =

American businessman and soldier (1928–2022)

- Born: May 20, 1928; Sacramento, California, U.S.
- Died: January 17, 2022 (aged 93)
- Education: Yuba College
- Alma mater: University of California; Stanford University
- Occupation: Businessman
- Military career
- Branch: United States Army
- Service years: 1950–1953
- Rank: First lieutenant
- Unit: 8240th Army Unit
- Conflict: Korean War

Detainment
- Country: North Korea
- Reason: Korean War participation
- Detained: October 26, 2013
- Released: December 7, 2013
- Time held: 1 month and 11 days

Merrill Edward Newman (May 20, 1928 – January 17, 2022) was a businessman and former United States Army officer. In 2013, he was arrested in North Korea and released 42 days later.

== Early life and education ==
Newman studied at Yuba College for one year before transferring to the University of California, Berkeley, where he earned a bachelor's degree in zoology in 1950. Newman earned a master's degree from Stanford University.

== Career ==
According to Newman's family, he served as an infantry officer in the U.S. Army during the Korean War. As a member of the 8240th Army Unit he advised a 8240th Army Unit at some time between 1950 and 1953.

He later worked in technology and financial consulting. After serving in the army, Newman was a high school teacher and, later, an executive for technology companies in Silicon Valley.

== 2013 arrest ==
In October 2013, Newman left his home in Palo Alto, California, for North Korea as part of a nine-day trip organized by Juche Travel Services, a travel agency that specializes in trips to North Korea. According to family members, Newman had generally been enjoying his trip and had communicated with them via telephone and postcards.

On October 26, after boarding an Air Koryo airliner in Pyongyang on which he was scheduled to depart the country, Newman was removed by a single, uniformed official. Newman's traveling companion reported the arrest to U.S. officials via telephone upon the aircraft's arrival in Beijing later that day.

On November 20, the San Jose Mercury News first reported on Newman's detention. In response to media inquiries, the United States Department of State confirmed that a U.S. citizen had recently been arrested in North Korea, but refused to specifically discuss the case beyond generally noting they were working with Sweden, the protecting power of the United States, to secure his release. Officials noted that the individual in question (generally accepted to be Newman) had not filed a privacy act waiver, which legally prevented them from providing specifics regarding the case to the press.

On November 21, former New Mexico governor turned diplomat Bill Richardson confirmed to Reuters that he was "in touch with his North Korean contacts" regarding Newman. At some point by or before November 22, DPRK authorities acknowledged to Swedish consular staff that they were holding Newman.

On November 29, the Korean Central News Agency (KCNA) released a video showing Newman signing a letter of apology and confession for war crimes committed during the Korean War. According to the accompanying report, the video had been recorded the preceding November 9. It went on to state that Newman had "masterminded espionage and subversive activities against North Korea and in this course he was involved in killings of service personnel of the Korean People's Army and innocent civilians" and that, during his visit, Newman had been found with an e-book containing subversive material. The KCNA story also reported that Newman said he had served during the Korean War as a military adviser to the "Kuwol unit of the U.N. Korea 6th Partisan Regiment" and had asked his government tour guides to help him contact surviving members of the Kuwol Partisan Comrades-in-Arms Association. (United Nations Partisan Infantry Korea units were clandestine, special forces groups that operated during the Korean War and whose activities were not publicly acknowledged until 1990.)

Kim Heyon, a former member of Newman's Korean War military unit, said that the irregular warfare engaged in by the partisan units had left Newman a permanently marked man in North Korea: "They detained him because he served in the Kuwol regiment. He is just a very bad guy for them." Dan Sneider, a North Korea specialist at Stanford University, remarked that "it seems that Mr. Newman inadvertently walked into a historical minefield that he wasn't fully aware of."

Newman was held in a room in Yanggakdo Hotel, North Korea's largest operating hotel. By December 1, the Swedish ambassador to North Korea, Karl-Olof Andersson, had visited Newman for the first time and found him to be in good health. At the same time, the United States National Security Council issued a statement requesting Newman's release, referring to Newman by name and also calling for the repatriation of Kenneth Bae. A Reuters report published later that day confirmed Newman's membership in the Kuwol regiment of the United Nations Partisan Infantry Korea. The Reuters article also revealed that Newman had twice visited South Korea, on both occasions wearing a commemorative ring that identified him as a former partisan. (No mention was made as to whether Newman had worn the same ring during his trip to North Korea.)

Details of Newman's military exploits had been included in a book published in South Korea and edited by a member of Newman's unit, Kim Heyon. Another partisan veteran stated that North Korean intelligence had obtained the complete roster of the Kuwol regiment, on which Newman's name was included, prior to the Korean War armistice. Together, these facts seemed to indicate that Newman's background was beyond concealment.

On December 7, Newman was released. After flying from Pyongyang to Beijing, Newman met with U.S. Embassy officials, who bought him a ticket to San Francisco International Airport; a medical officer provided him with medications, and cleared him to fly. Newman boarded the flight the same day, declining an offer from Vice President Joe Biden, who was touring East Asia at the same time, to take a later flight out of Seoul on Air Force Two.

After returning to the United States, Newman declined interview requests from media but casually remarked he had been well taken care of and held in comfortable conditions during his detention. Newman did not immediately retract his written confession, however, and "smirked" at a reporter who asked him about it. In a subsequent written statement released by Newman's family, Newman declared his confession had been coerced, writing that "the words were not mine and were not delivered voluntarily." In the same statement, however, Newman confirmed the veracity of the earlier KCNA report that he had requested his North Korean tour guides put him in contact with former anti-communist insurgents, but claimed it was for reasons of "curiosity" and his intention in making contact with guerrilla fighters had been "misinterpreted ... as something more sinister."

In 2014, journalist Mike Chinoy published an e-book about Newman's detention, The Last P.O.W.

== Personal life ==
As of 2013, Newman was living with his wife in Channing House, a Palo Alto retirement community. Family members said that, at the time of his arrest, Newman suffered from a heart condition for which he needed medication.

Newman died on January 17, 2022, at age 93.

== See also ==
- List of Americans detained by North Korea
