= Kenneth Bae =

American missionary held as prisoner in North Korea

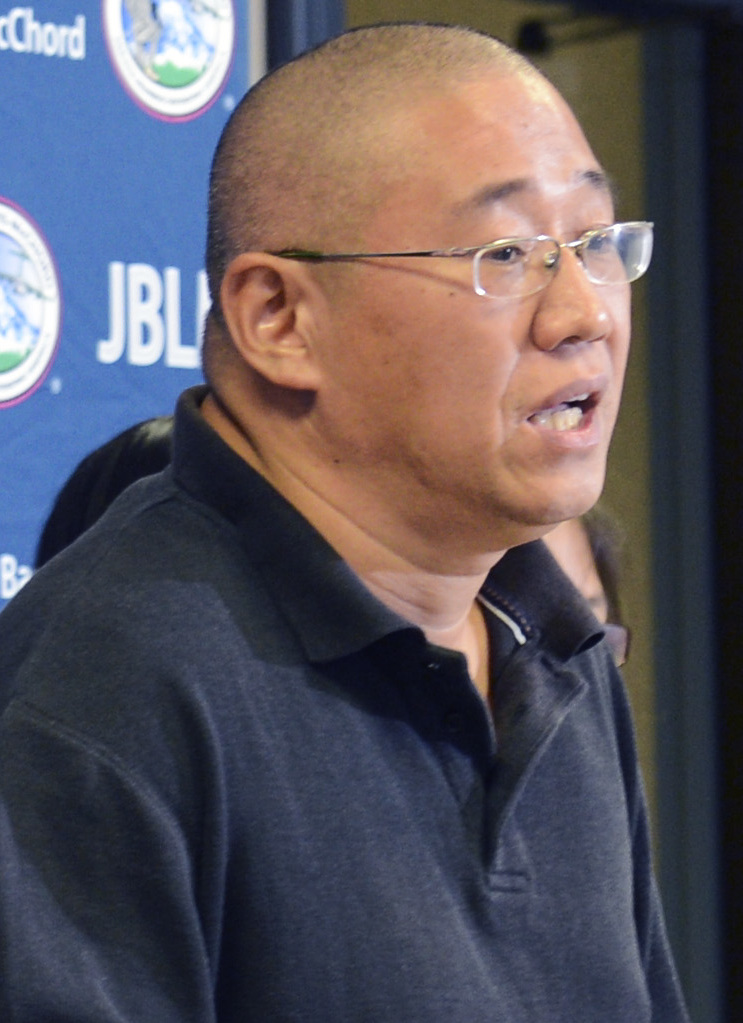
- Bae in 2014
- Born: Bae Jun-ho; August 1, 1968 (age 58); South Korea
- Citizenship: American, South Korean (former)
- Education: Covenant Theological Seminary (MDiv)
- Organization: NGI - Nehemiah Global Initiative
- Children: 3 biological, 1 stepchild

Korean name
- Hangul: 배준호
- RR: Bae Junho
- MR: Pae Chunho

Detainment
- Country: North Korea
- Detained: November 3, 2012
- Released: November 8, 2014
- Days in detention: 735
- Sentence: 15 years of hard labor
- Reason for detention: Hostile acts against the republic
- Website: http://ngikorea.org

Kenneth Bae (born Bae Jun-ho; born August 1, 1968) is a South Korean-born American Evangelical Christian missionary. Convicted by North Korea on charges of planning to overthrow the government, he was sentenced to 15 years of imprisonment in April 2013. Bae was released on November 8, 2014, along with fellow American Matthew Todd Miller.

In 2016, he founded the NGO named NGI – Nehemiah Global Initiative, whose goals consist of remembering, rescuing, and recovering North Korean refugees and rebuilding their lives in China and South Korea.

== Early life ==
Bae was born in South Korea in 1968. He moved to the United States at age 16 with his family in 1985, first settling in San Jose, California then later relocating to Torrance, California, in Los Angeles County. Bae (as Jun Ho Bae) graduated from West High School in Torrance in 1988, when he was 20 years old. He studied at the University of Oregon in Eugene, Oregon for two years, majoring in psychology and minoring in Chinese in preparation for possible ministerial work in China. Bae left schooling altogether for a time in order to support his family. Later, he studied at the San Francisco Bible College, graduating in 1996, as well as at Covenant Theological Seminary, where he earned a Master's of Divinity degree in 2002.

== Career and personal life ==
Bae met his wife, Lydia, two weeks after starting at the University of Oregon, and got married a year later. They have two children. Bae later moved to Dalian, China in 2006, and then to Dandong, China, near neighboring North Korea.

Bae lived in Lynnwood, Washington, in Snohomish County. Bae has a sister, Terri Chung, who is stated to live in Lynnwood and in Edmonds, which is also in Snohomish County.

As of January 2014, Bae is the father of two children in Arizona and of another child in Hawaii, ages 17, 22 and 23. Bae also has at least one stepdaughter.

Working with YWAM's University of the Nations, Bae lived in China with his wife and his step-daughter for seven years. He created a tourism company called "Nations Tour" for North Korean special economic zone visits that were stated to be Christian missionary trips.

== Arrest and prosecution ==
In December 2012, human rights activists in Seoul reported that an American had been held in North Korea for a month. On December 21, 2012, North Korea announced that it had charged an American identified as Bae Jun-ho with "hostile acts against the republic." Between January 7 and January 10, former UN ambassador Bill Richardson was unable to meet Bae and delivered a letter from Bae's son to North Korean authorities.

North Korean media stated Bae was prosecuted with:

- Working with evangelical organization Youth with a Mission (YWAM) and its missionary training center, the University of the Nations; Bae is accused of preaching against the North Korean government in American and South Korean churches.
- Planning an anti-North Korean religious coup d'état called "Operation Jericho" (a reference to the biblical city whose walls were toppled by the sound of the Israelites' trumpets), which began in the US, South Korea, and China long before Bae traveled to North Korea.
- Setting up bases in China for the purpose of toppling the DPRK.
- Encouraging North Korean citizens to bring down the government.
- Conducting a malignant smear campaign.

On April 30, 2013, North Korea's Supreme Court sentenced Bae to 15 years of hard labor.

== Prison life ==
On May 14, 2013, he was moved to a special prison. Bae would do eight hours of farm labor a day.

Bae sent hand-written letters to his family claiming that he was going blind and that help was needed. On July 3, 2013, an interview with Bae was released, in which he spoke of health problems including diabetes, high blood pressure, fatty liver, and a back problem. When asked if prison life was bearable, he replied: "Yes, people here are very considerate. But my health is not in the best condition, so there are some difficulties. But, everyone here is considerate and generous, and we have doctors here, so I'm getting regular check-ups." A Swedish ambassador met with Bae in a hospital in August 2013; his sister reported that he was moved from the camp because of deteriorating health and after losing more than 50 pounds (23 kg). Bae's mother, Myunghee Bae, arrived in North Korea on October 11 to visit her son for five days. She was allowed three visits, totaling six hours. In February 2014, Bae left the hospital and returned to the work camp.

== Reactions ==
=== United States ===
On the day he was sentenced, the United States called for the immediate release of Kenneth Bae on humanitarian grounds. During the 2013 Korean crisis, North Korea stated that the reason the country did not invite US officials to Pyongyang for Bae's release is that he is not a "political bargaining chip."

On July 3, 2013, an interview with Bae was released, in which he begged for forgiveness from his captors and for the United States' help. Despite getting a weekly update from the State Department, Kenneth's family insisted that the United States government wasn't doing a good enough job bringing him back. It was confirmed later in July that Jimmy Carter had no plans to visit North Korea regarding Bae.

On August 13, State Department spokeswoman Marie Harf stated that the United States was "willing to consider a number of different options to secure his release." On August 27, the United States announced that its North Korean human rights envoy, Robert R. King, would travel to Pyongyang and ask for the government to pardon Bae, but three days later North Korea rescinded its invitation. The reason given for the cancellation was that the United States used nuclear-capable bombers in military drills with South Korea.

On November 30, the United States called for the release of Bae and Merrill Newman, an American citizen also being detained who confessed to "indelible crimes" during his service in the Korean War. National Security Council spokeswoman Caitlin Hayden said: "We continue to urge the DPRK authorities to grant [Bae] amnesty and immediate release." American officials talked to relatives of both detainees. On December 7, Newman was released; Marie Harf stated: "We welcome the DPRK's decision to release [Newman]. This positive decision by the DPRK throws into sharper relief the continuing detention of Bae. We call on the DPRK once again to pardon and grant Mr. Bae special amnesty and immediately release him as a humanitarian gesture so that he too can return home to his family."

On January 20, 2014, Bae said in a statement that he had committed a "serious crime" against North Korea, and that the nation does "not abuse human rights." He asked the United States government "to make more active efforts and pay more attention." The United States then offered to send Robert R. King to North Korea.

=== Dennis Rodman ===
I'm gonna try and get the guy out... It's gonna be difficult.

— Dennis Rodman, May 10, 2013

On May 7, 2013, after reading an article from The Seattle Times, former professional basketball player Dennis Rodman sent out a tweet asking his "friend" Kim Jong Un to do him "a solid" and release Bae.

On May 10, Rodman promised that he would go to North Korea on August 1 to rescue Bae. Rodman criticized United States President Barack Obama, saying, "We got a black president [who] can't even go talk to [Jong-un] ... Obama can't do anything, I don't know why he won't go talk to him." Rodman did not go to North Korea in August, but did go in September 2013. While in Beijing, Rodman said he was visiting North Korea again to create a basketball league there and to fix North Korea–United States relations. Rodman declined to discuss Bae. The same month, Rodman returned from China and lost his temper when he was asked questions about Bae, saying that Bae was not his responsibility.

On January 7, 2014, while in North Korea, Rodman was asked if he would raise the issue of Kenneth Bae during a CNN interview. He became agitated and said, "Kenneth Bae did one thing ... If you understand what Kenneth Bae did. Do you understand what he did in this country? No, no, no, you tell me, you tell me. Why is he held captive here in this country, why? ... I would love to speak on this." The next day, Bae's sister said of Rodman's comments, "There is no diplomacy, only games, and at my brother's expense." Rodman apologized for his comments about Kenneth Bae on January 9, 2014, saying he had been drinking and was stressed when he made the remarks.

Kenneth Bae would later credit Dennis Rodman with his early release, saying that Rodman's rant raised awareness of his case and that he wished to personally thank him.

== Release ==
Bae was released by North Korean authorities on Saturday, November 8, 2014, along with fellow American Matthew Todd Miller.

In 2016, Bae published a book about his ordeal: Not Forgotten: The True Story of My Imprisonment in North Korea.

In 2017, Bae decided to fund a NGO to help North Korean refugees and raise the awareness of people around the world about the situation in North Korea.

As of 2026, Kenneth Bae seeks to launch a radio channel called "Korea Link", aiming to broadcast directly into North Korea to provide its citizens with news, information, and a connection to the outside world. The plan was announced by Bae's nonprofit organization, New Korea Foundation International, and 45 other South Korean civic and religious groups which formed a joint association.

== See also ==
- Human rights in North Korea
- List of Americans detained by North Korea
- Hyeon Soo Lim, a Canadian Christian detained in February 2015 under similar circumstances and sentenced to life in prison with hard labor.
