= Robert Park (activist) =

American activist

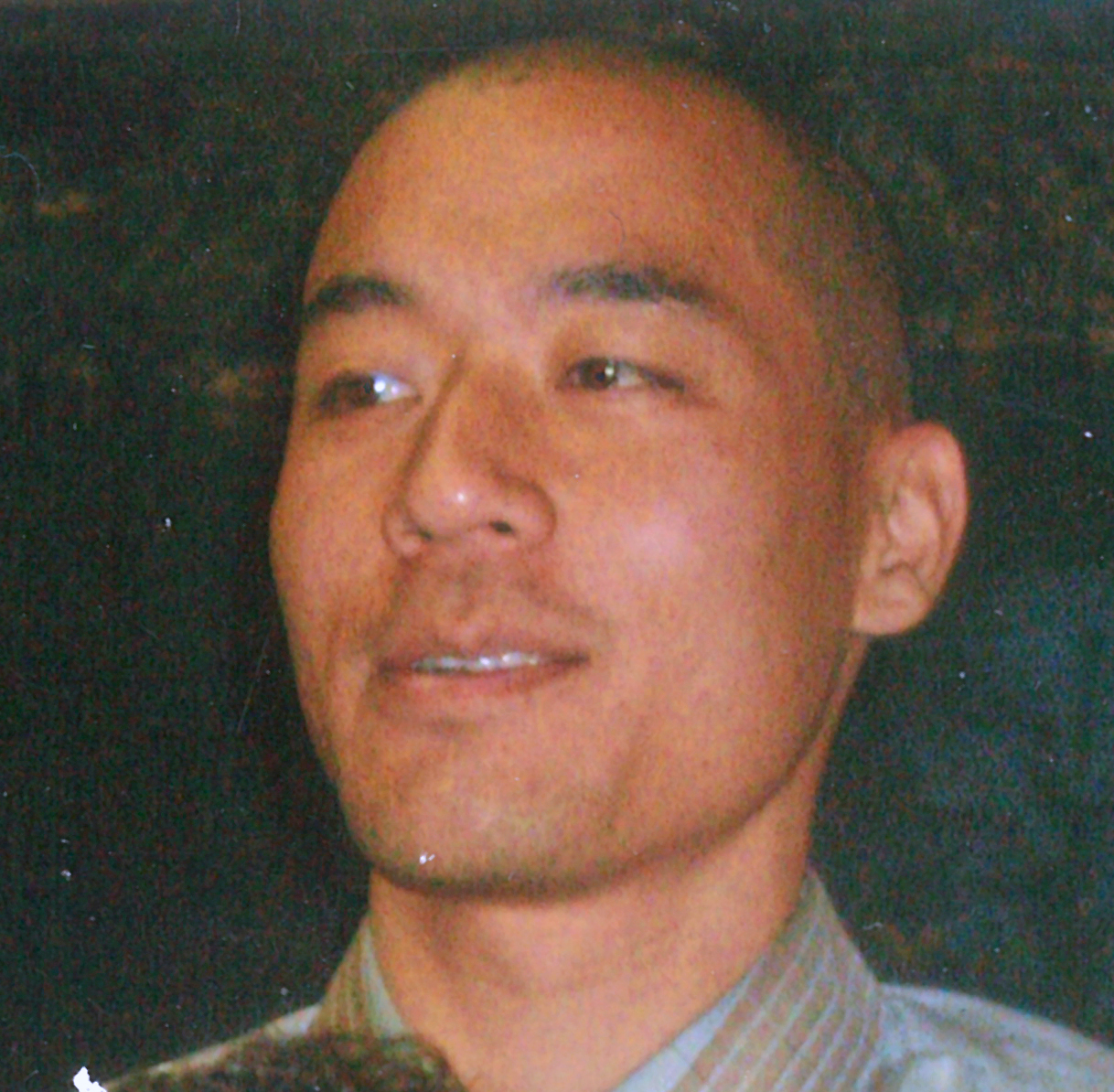
- Born: 1981 (age 44–45); Los Angeles, California, U.S.
- Occupations: Missionary, human rights activist, peace advocate, pro-unification columnist

Detainment
- Country: North Korea
- Detained: December 25, 2009
- Released: February 6, 2010
- Days in detention: 43
- Reason for detention: Illegally entering North Korea

Robert Park (born 1981) is a Korean-American missionary, musician, and human rights activist. A peace advocate and supporter of Korean reunification, he is a founding member of the nonpartisan Worldwide Coalition to Stop Genocide in North Korea and a frequent columnist for South Korea's largest English newspaper, The Korea Herald. In December 2009 he was detained in North Korea for illegal entry after crossing the Sino-Korean border on Christmas Day to protest against the country's human rights situation. He was released in February 2010 after being detained for 43 days. He reported having suffered torture during his detention.

== Early life ==
Park was born in Los Angeles, California. His Korean name is Park Dong-hoon (박동훈), and his grandparents were prominent Christians in North Korea before Korea's division. He spent much of his early life in California, Mexico and Arizona, where in 2007 he was ordained as a missionary by a non-denominational Church. Prior to his involvement with North Korea-related work, Park was active as a missionary in Sonora, Mexico, where he had assisted in the organization and delivery of humanitarian relief over several years.

== Detention in North Korea ==
On December 25, 2009, he crossed the Chinese border into North Korea by walking across a frozen stretch of the Tumen River. He was quickly apprehended by North Korean border guards for illegal entry. In a media interview conducted prior to his journey and published after his arrest, Park said he believed it was his duty as a Christian to do whatever he could to protest against human rights violations in the country, and that he was entering North Korea to call forcefully for the release of political prisoners, who he has argued through numerous articles are victims of genocide and crimes against humanity as defined under international law.

While under arrest, Park made a public confession and apology for his actions. On February 5, 2010, the North Korean government announced that it had pardoned Park. He was deported by plane to Beijing, China, from where he was then flown back to the United States. He later recanted his confession as having been made under duress, and reported having suffered torture and beatings during his detention. He was hospitalized for PTSD on multiple occasions following his detention, sometimes spanning a number of months.

== Post-release ==
As a victim of North Korean torture, Park is preparing to file a lawsuit in the U.S. Federal Court under the Torture Victims Protection Act of 1991.

His writings on the North Korean human rights situation have been published in the Harvard International Review, The Washington Post, Haaretz, San Jose Mercury News, Asia Times, South China Morning Post, National Post, The Diplomat, World Policy, Columbia Journal of International Affairs, The Hill, The Korea Times, and numerous other publications. He is a contributor to World Affairs Journal and a regular columnist for The Korea Herald.

On December 19, 2011, Genocide Watch, an international NGO and human rights watchdog, published a report which quoted heavily from a 2011 article penned by Park for the Asia Times, entitled "North Korea and the Genocide Convention." The paper concluded North Korea was actively committing genocide as defined by the UN Genocide Convention. Park has repeatedly called for concerned persons and organizations to increase financial support towards North Korean defectors, who are able to remit money back to their families in the North, potentially making possible an organized movement to halt atrocities.

Park had advocated for amnesty as an alternative to US military actions and advocates consistently for support and outreach to the North Korean people, whom he regards as victims of the forcibly installed Kim family dynasty. His closest friends are reportedly North Korean refugees.

== Music ==
Post-detention and release, Park began to compose music and poems to cope with trauma as well as continue to address human right issues. Concerning his song, "Indifference," recorded and released via music video in demo form, The Big Takeover site highlighted the track as "an enraged and sagacious masterpiece" and Park's songwriting in general as "heart-rending, relevant and timeless."

Blurt indicated the name of his music project as Malheur V.O.L., Malheur being the French word for "affliction" and V.O.L. being an acronym for "La Violencia del Amor," the title of a work by Oscar Romero. The project moniker is also directly inspired by Simone Weil's 1942 essay "L'amour de Dieu et le malheur."

== Writings ==
- "Protect North Korean refugees in China", Korea Joongang Daily, Feb 17, 2012
- "North Korean refugees face slaughter when China repatriates them", San Jose Mercury News, February 28, 2012
- "Remembering Godang Cho Man-sik (1883-1950)", The Korea Herald, Oct 19, 2016
- "Amnesty for NK officials Kim's strategic nightmare", The Korea Herald, Feb 6, 2017
- "Ji Seong-ho: Hero fostering unity and inspiring change", The Korea Herald, Apr 3, 2017
- "Instead of war, offer North Korea an amnesty in exchange for Kim", The Nation, May 17, 2017
- "Kim dynasty: "Nazi-like" fascism that imperialism begot", The Korea Herald, May 31, 2017
- "A path to free NK political prisoners", The Korea Herald, Jun 22, 2017
- "Nation or collateral damage of preventive war?", The Korea Herald, Sept 14, 2017
- "Former American prisoner of North Korea pleads for peace", The Korea Herald, Oct 11, 2017

== See also ==
- List of Americans detained by North Korea
- Genocide of Christians in North Korea
- "The song INDIFFERENCE on YouTube"
