= Julie Turner =

American diplomat

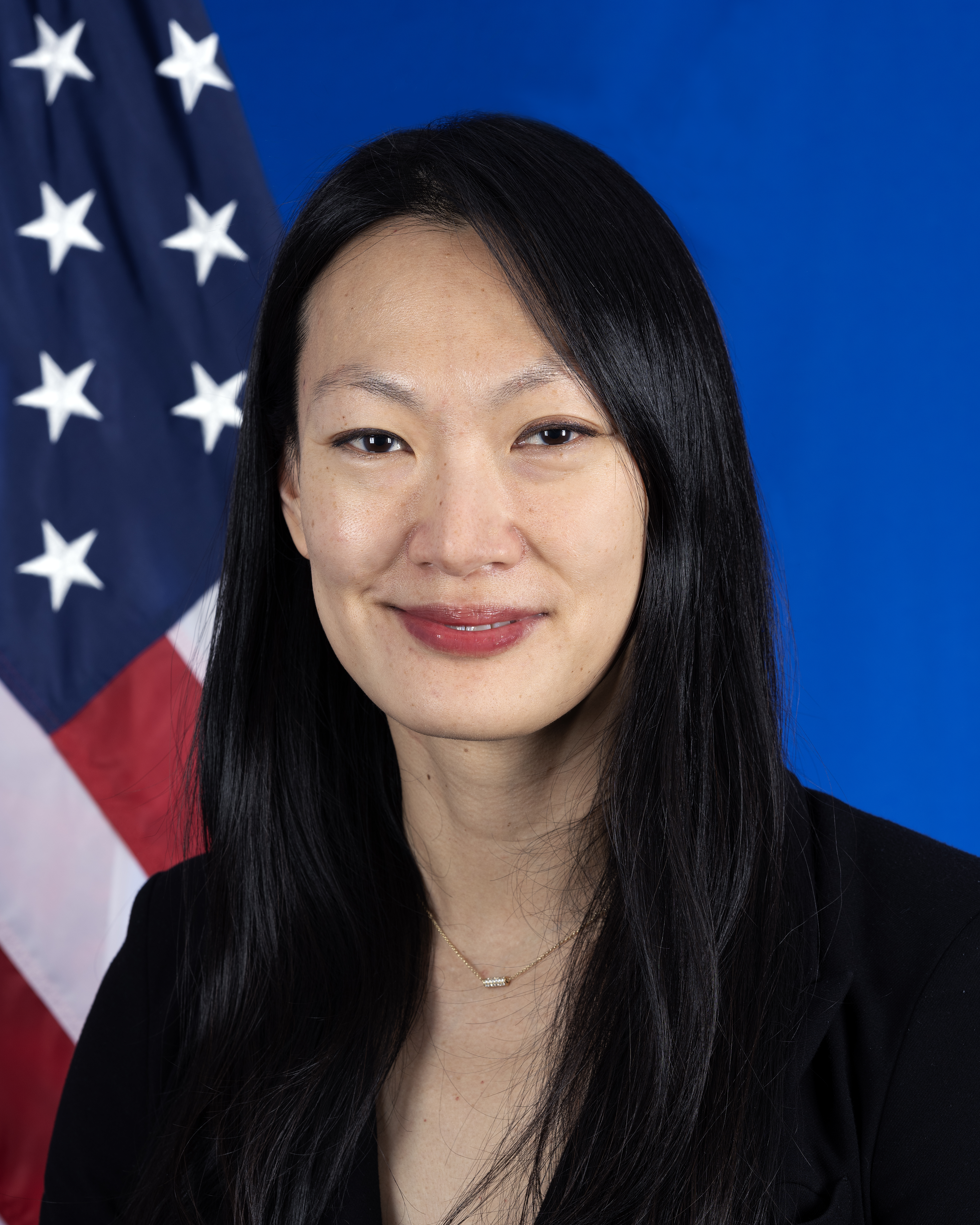

Special Envoy on North Korean Human Rights Issues
- In office October 13, 2023 – January 23, 2025
- President: Joe Biden; Donald Trump
- Preceded by: Robert R. King (2017)

Personal details
- Education: Pepperdine University (BA); University of Maryland, College Park (MA)

Julie Turner is an American diplomat who has served as acting Deputy Assistant Secretary of State in the Bureau of Democracy, Human Rights, and Labor. She had served as special envoy on North Korean human rights issues in the United States Department of State.

== Education ==
Turner earned a Bachelor of Arts degree from Pepperdine University and a Master of Arts from the University of Maryland, College Park.

== Career ==
A career diplomat, Turner served in the Bureau of East Asian and Pacific Affairs for 16 years. She recently served as director of the Office of East Asia and the Pacific in the Bureau of Democracy, Human Rights, and Labor and was director for Southeast Asia at the United States National Security Council.

=== North Korea Envoy Nomination ===
On January 23, 2023, President Joe Biden nominated Turner as Special Envoy on North Korean Human Rights Issues. Hearings on her nomination were held before the Senate Foreign Relations Committee on May 17, 2023. The committee favorably reported her nomination to the Senate floor on June 1, 2023. Her nomination was confirmed by the full United States Senate via voice vote on July 27, 2023.

Political offices
Preceded by Robert R. King	United States Special Envoy for North Korean Human Rights Issues; 2023–present	Incumbent
