= Disappearance of David Sneddon =

2004 abduction of an American student

David Sneddon
- Born: David Louis Sneddon; May 3, 1980; United States
- Disappeared: August 14, 2004 (aged 24); Yunnan Province, China
- Status: Missing for 22 years, 1 month and 17 days
- Spouse: Kim Eun Hye (presumed)
- Children: 2 (presumed)

David Louis Sneddon (born May 3, 1980; disappeared August 14, 2004), is an American university student who disappeared in Yunnan Province, China, after traveling alone through Tiger Leaping Gorge. Over 12 years later, on August 31, 2016, the Abductee's Family Union of South Korea claimed that it had gathered intelligence demonstrating Sneddon had been abducted by North Korean agents and taken to North Korea where he became the personal English language tutor to Kim Jong-un.

== Aftermath of disappearance ==
The official position of the Chinese government is that Sneddon died after falling into the Jinsha River, which passes through Tiger Leaping Gorge. However, no body has been recovered. The United States initially accepted the Chinese government's position. But after supposedly discovering evidence that Sneddon was abducted by the North Korean government, the U.S. House of Representatives unanimously voted on September 28, 2016, to direct the U.S. State Department and all other intelligence agencies to reopen the investigations into Sneddon's whereabouts. The U.S. Senate passed a similar resolution by unanimous vote more than two years later on November 29, 2018. North Korea has denied its involvement in Sneddon's disappearance. Local news sites say that Sneddon is married to Kim Eun Hye in North Korea, with whom he has two children, and goes by the name of Yoon Bong Soo.

== See also ==
- List of people who disappeared mysteriously (2000–present)
- North Korean abductions
