= John Short (missionary) =

Australian missionary

- Born: John Alexander Short; 26 January 1939 (age 87); Barmera, South Australia, Australia
- Occupation: Missionary
- Known for: Arrest and detention by North Korea

John Alexander Short (simplified Chinese: 苏约翰; traditional Chinese: 蘇約翰; pinyin: Sū Yuēhàn; Wade–Giles: Su Yüeh-han; Jyutping: sou^{1} joek^{3}hon^{6}; born 26 January 1939) is a Hong Kong-based Australian Christian missionary noted for his 2014 arrest in North Korea and subsequent release 15 days later.

== Early life and education ==
Short was born to working class Anglican parents in Barmera, South Australia. As a child, he attended Sunday School at church. He attended the Adelaide Boys High School and graduated from the Royal Adelaide Dental Hospital as a dental technician. In 1962, he joined the staff of the Adelaide YMCA and worked there until his departure in 1964.

== Work in Hong Kong ==
In 1964, Short moved to Hong Kong to do missionary work. He initially catered to Chinese refugees from the mainland while studying the Cantonese language in his free time. He later set up several churches in Hong Kong in the 1970s.

In 1976, while on a return visit to Australia, he met his future wife, Karen, whom he married in 1978. They had three sons, all of whom grew up in Hong Kong but now live outside Hong Kong.

After the end of the Cultural Revolution, Short expanded his work into mainland China. He was arrested on several occasions by Chinese authorities. On one particular occasion in 1996, he was banished from mainland China for two years until 1998, when he was allowed to re-enter the mainland.

== Arrest in North Korea ==
Short first visited North Korea in February 2013. He reportedly read his Bible and discussed his Christian faith with his government minders during that visit. On 15 February 2014, Short visited North Korea for a second time. Originally scheduled to return to Hong Kong on 20 February, Short was arrested on 16 February after authorities discovered that he left Korean-language pamphlets on Christianity at a Buddhist temple in Pyongyang. His arrest was first reported on 18 February.

On 3 March 2014, the Korean Central News Agency aired footage of Short writing and reciting a statement apologizing for his actions in North Korea. Short was released later that same day. He subsequently said that he had been "interrogated daily" during his detention in North Korea.

== See also ==
- Merrill Newman
- Kenneth Bae
