= Marie Harf =

Political commentator for Fox News

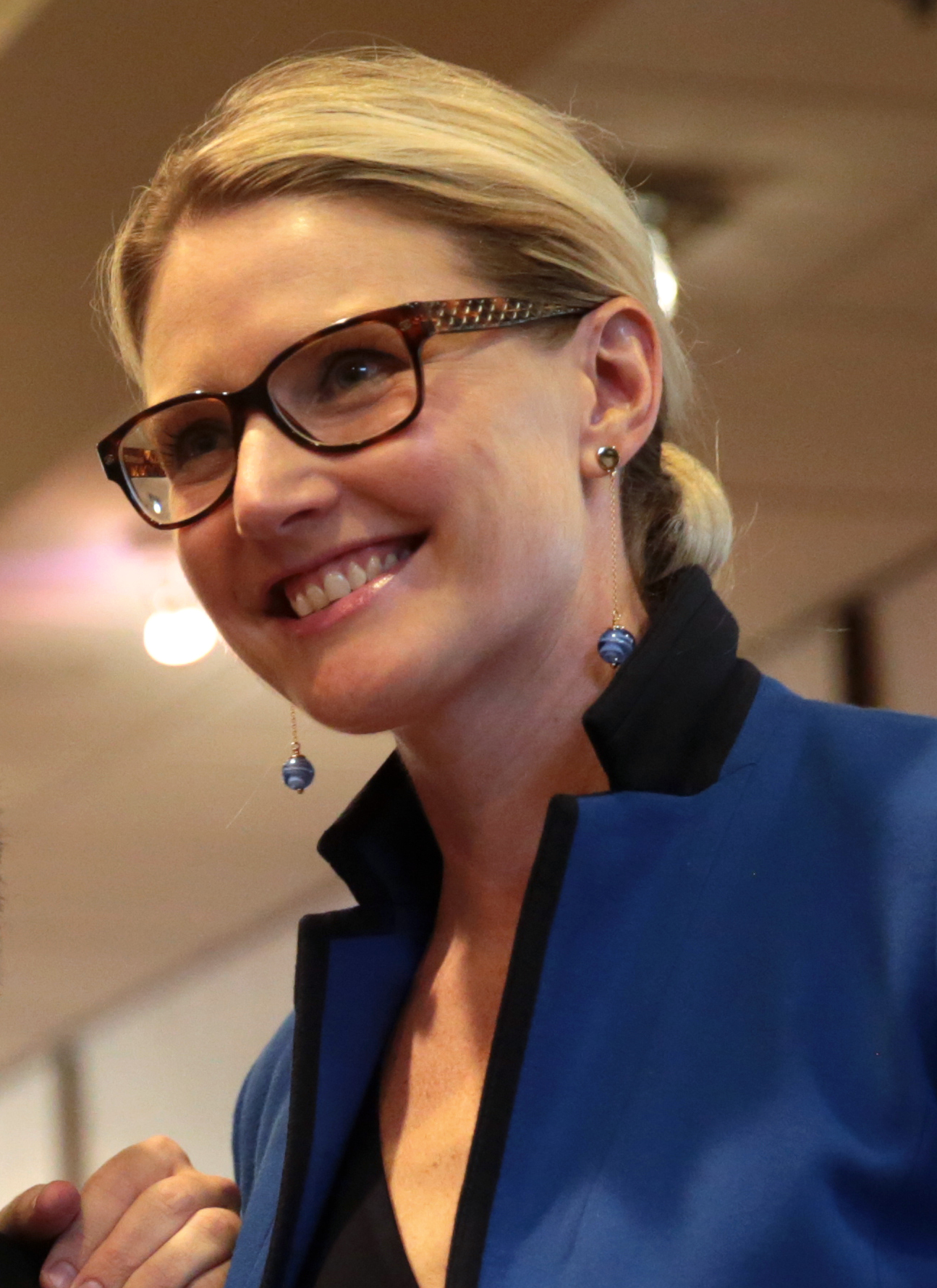

Deputy Spokesperson for the United States Department of State
- In office July 2013 – May 13, 2015
- President: Barack Obama
- Leader: Jen Psaki

Acting Spokesperson for the United States Department of State
- In office March 31, 2015 – May 13, 2015
- Preceded by: Jen Psaki
- Succeeded by: John Kirby

Personal details
- Born: Marie Elizabeth Harf; June 15, 1981 (age 45) Granville, Ohio, U.S.
- Party: Democratic
- Spouse: Joshua Lucas (m. 2012)
- Education: Indiana University Bloomington; University of Virginia

Marie Elizabeth Harf (born June 15, 1981) is an American political commentator for the Fox News Channel and former deputy campaign manager for policy and communications for the Representative Seth Moulton (D-Mass.) presidential campaign. She served as the Senior Advisor for Strategic Communications to U.S. Secretary of State John Kerry, leading the Iran nuclear negotiations communications strategy. Prior to that, Harf was Acting Spokesperson and Deputy Spokesperson for the United States Department of State.

== Early life ==
Harf is the daughter of Jane Ax Harf of Granville, Ohio and James E. Harf of St. Louis, Missouri, and is a native of Granville, Ohio. She graduated from Granville High School in 1999.

She graduated from Indiana University Bloomington with a BA in Political Science with concentrations in Jewish Studies and Russian and Eastern European Studies, and then received her master's degree in Foreign Affairs from the University of Virginia, where her thesis examined the prospects for continued regime stability in Saudi Arabia.

== Career ==
Harf began her career at the Directorate of Intelligence at the CIA as an analyst focusing on Middle Eastern leadership issues. She later became the media spokesperson for the CIA.

During the 2012 presidential election, she reportedly helped craft U.S. President Barack Obama's national security and communications strategy, and also served as campaign spokesperson on national security issues. After Obama's re-election to a second term of office, Harf was the press spokesperson for Chuck Hagel during his confirmation to be Secretary of Defense.

In June 2013, Harf was appointed Deputy Spokesperson for the Department of State, where she served under Jen Psaki.

Harf attracted controversy for an interview she gave on Hardball with Chris Matthews on February 16, 2015, following the release the day before of a video by the Islamic State of Iraq and Syria (ISIS) showing the beheading of 21 Egyptian Coptic Christians in Libya. In response to questioning from Matthews on the U.S.'s strategy toward ISIS, Harf said, "We cannot kill our way out of this war. We need in the medium to longer term to go after the root causes that leads people to join these groups, whether it's a lack of opportunity for jobs, whether ..." Her critics ridiculed her on social media with the hashtag "#JobsForISIS", which became a top 10 trending topic on U.S. Twitter.

In April 2015, Bloomberg News reported that retiring U.S. Navy Rear Admiral John Kirby would soon be appointed Spokesperson for the Department of State, replacing Acting Spokesperson Marie Harf, who had also interviewed for the position. In 2013, Kirby was selected rather than Harf for the spokesperson position at the U.S. Department of Defense under Secretary of Defense Chuck Hagel.

Harf served as Acting Spokesperson until May 13, 2015, and on June 1, 2015, she began a new role as Senior Advisor for Strategic Communications to Secretary of State John Kerry, continuing her work leading the Iran nuclear negotiations communications strategy.

In January 2017, she left U.S. government service to be a political commentator for Fox News. In May 2019, Harf left Fox News to work for Rep. Seth Moulton's presidential campaign. After Rep. Moulton suspended his campaign, she became the Executive Director of the progressive Serve America PAC, founded by Seth Moulton. She returned as a Fox News Contributor in September 2019.

== Personal life ==
Harf married Joshua Lucas on April 14, 2012.
