= Hyeon Soo Lim =

Korean Canadian pastor (born 1955)

- Born: February 16, 1955 (age 71); Seoul, South Korea
- Occupation: Pastor
- Known for: Imprisoned by North Korea

- Hyeon Soo Lim
- Hangul: 임현수
- RR: Im Hyeonsu
- MR: Im Hyŏnsu

Hyeon Soo Lim (Korean: 임현수; born February 16, 1955) is a Canadian pastor of the Big Light Korean Presbyterian Church in Mississauga. He is a South Korean-born Canadian citizen. He was operating humanitarian efforts in North Korea providing tens of millions of dollars' worth of aid before disappearing in February 2015. The DPRK had arrested him and in December 2015, Lim was sentenced to life with hard labour for crimes against the North Korean regime.

In August 2017, Prime Minister Justin Trudeau sent a Canadian international government delegation to Pyongyang to discuss the case. Lim was released from detention on August 9, 2017, and arrived in Canada on August 12, 2017.

== Early life ==
Lim was born in South Korea and grew up in Seoul. The family attended a devout Christian church that produced numerous pastors and missionaries. His father, who was born in North Korea, held an office job and his mother worked at a family supermarket.

A longtime friend, now a pastor in California, recalls that in high school it was already clear to the two of them that they "were going to do God's work." Lim was active with Campus Crusade for Christ.

Lim moved to Canada in January 1986, "as part of a missionary group." In Toronto, Lim studied theology at Knox College, a seminary of the Presbyterian Church in Canada. He became a Canadian citizen.

== Light Korean Presbyterian Church ==
Lim joined or founded and became the senior pastor of the Light Korean Presbyterian Church in Mississauga, Ontario. Under his leadership the congregation grew from a dozen people in 1986 to more than 3,000 members in 2015. It operates from a complex that includes a 1,773-seat sanctuary, an education wing of numerous classrooms, a 5,260-square-foot fellowship hall with a full commercial kitchen, a 6,650-square-foot gymnasium and a 248-seat chapel. He also runs a second young person-oriented church in downtown Toronto.

In 1996, during the North Korean four-year famine that killed an estimated 500,000 to 600,000 people, Lim took an interest in helping North Koreans and used his church as a support base.

== Humanitarian work ==
Lim has done humanitarian work in a variety of countries, but he has visited North Korea over 100 times since 1997. These humanitarian missions have included support for a nursing home, a nursery, an orphanage, and much more. While his church blocked efforts to talk to people working with Lim for his safety, The Globe and Mail found evidence of extensive efforts to start businesses, import and export food, glasses, fuel, and other goods, feed thousands of people, and even buy the largest hotel in North Korea. The for-profit business interests, in the magnitude of tens of millions of dollars, were used to fund humanitarian efforts. Lim maintained high-level contacts in North Korea and Canada, including with the Prime Minister's office. He cooperated with people around the world including the US, New Zealand, China and other places.

Working with government officials is unavoidable in a state where everything is under government control, but working with the North Korean government increases risk. Lim focused his efforts around Rajin, near the Rason Special Economic Zone which is an important North Korean effort to gain foreign investment. The Rason zone was led by Jang Song-thaek, an uncle of North Korean leader Kim Jong-un, whom Kim had executed in December 2013. Agence France-Presse first reported a link with Jang's circle, and Lim's cooperation with North Korean officials who had ties to Jang could have been a problem according to experts on the DPRK. Any links between Lim and political elites were denied by spokespersons from Lim's church.

== North Korean imprisonment ==
Lim travelled to North Korea on January 31, 2015, crossing the land border with China to visit the northeastern city of Rajin, and then disappeared. Much later it was determined he was arrested in February. In a video released by a North Korean propaganda website in August, Hyeon appeared to read from a script to a nearly empty state-operated Pongsu Church in Pyongyang. "The worst crime I committed was to rashly defame and insult the highest dignity and the system of the republic." Former prisoners in North Korea report being coerced into similar confessions.

According to the DPRK's official Korean Central News Agency (KCNA) Lim admitted during the trial to "not only viciously defaming the highest dignity of Korea and its system but also possessing the wicked intention of trying to topple the Republic by staging an anti-state conspiracy." According to China's official Xinhua news agency, "The court said Lim had attempted to overthrow the North Korean government and undermine its social system with 'religious activities' for the past 18 years". While North Korea was not specific about his alleged crimes, Xinhua reported that Lim confessed to helping people defect from North Korea, and that he had met the U.S. ambassador to Mongolia regarding the plans (Mongolia is a known path out for North Korean defectors). The Canadian Broadcasting Corporation (CBC) reported the trial lasted 90 minutes and the charges included "harming the dignity of the supreme leadership, trying to use religion to destroy the North Korean system, disseminating negative propaganda about the North to the overseas Koreans, and helping U.S. and the South Korean authorities lure and abduct North Korean citizens, along with aiding their programs to assist defectors from the North."

KCNA further said that the prosecution sought the death penalty, but the defense requested leniency despite the gravity of his crimes "so that he can witness for himself the reality of the nation of the Sun as it grows in power and prosperity," Lim's lawyer was reported to have claimed "he had frankly confessed to everything the prosecution had brought up."

On December 16, 2015, Lim was sentenced to life imprisonment with hard labour for crimes against the state of North Korea.

== Diplomatic efforts to secure release ==
Because of the sensitivity of the situation and privacy rules the Canadian Foreign Affairs office has said little about Lim's situation. North Korea and Canada do not have regular diplomatic relations, with Canada using the Swedish embassy in Pyongyang, which the Globe and Mail reported is staffed by a single person. Diplomatic contact between Canada and North Korea is also made via United Nations representatives. In recent years, Liberal Prime Minister Jean Chrétien established diplomatic ties with the DPRK in 2001 but Conservative Prime Minister Stephen Harper suspended most contact with North Korea in 2010, and then imposed strict trade and travel sanctions. Canadian officials were using back channels and meeting on the edge of world conferences to press for Lim's release. The election of a Liberal Party of Canada government was seen by his family as an opportunity for a breakthrough.

After the sentencing, the Canadian Department of Foreign Affairs stated that it had been an "unduly harsh sentence given to Mr. Lim by a North Korean court, particularly given his age and fragile health." The Canadian government had not been given access to Lim and that the lack of access represents "a serious violation of the Vienna Convention on Consular Relations and the right of states to have consular access to their citizens."

He was released on August 9, 2017, after a Canadian delegation visited Pyongyang and arrived back in Canada on August 12, 2017.

In a post-release interview, Lim attributed his arrest to a video clip of a speech he made at a Christian conference in the United States, where he stated that North Koreans should "believe in God instead of Kim Il-sung and Jesus instead of Kim Jong-Il", which was posted on the internet without his permission and noticed by North Korean authorities.

== See also ==
- Kenneth Bae, a Korean-American Christian missionary convicted of "anti-state" crimes and given a 15-year sentence in North Korea, but released in 2014.
