= Meanings of minor-planet names: 109001–110000 =

As minor planet discoveries are confirmed, they are given a permanent number by the IAU's Minor Planet Center (MPC), and the discoverers can then submit names for them, following the IAU's naming conventions. The list below concerns those minor planets in the specified number-range that have received names, and explains the meanings of those names.

Official naming citations of newly named small Solar System bodies are approved and published in a bulletin by IAU's Working Group for Small Bodies Nomenclature (WGSBN). Before May 2021, citations were published in MPC's Minor Planet Circulars for many decades. Recent citations can also be found on the JPL Small-Body Database (SBDB). Until his death in 2016, German astronomer Lutz D. Schmadel compiled these citations into the Dictionary of Minor Planet Names (DMP) and regularly updated the collection.

Based on Paul Herget's The Names of the Minor Planets, Schmadel also researched the unclear origin of numerous asteroids, most of which had been named prior to World War II. This article incorporates text from this source, which is in the public domain: SBDB New namings may only be added to this list below after official publication as the preannouncement of names is condemned. The WGSBN publishes a comprehensive guideline for the naming rules of non-cometary small Solar System bodies.

== 109001–109100 ==
Named minor planet	Provisional	This minor planet was named for...	Ref · Catalog
109097 Hamuy	2001 QM_{33}	Mario Hamuy (born 1960), Professor of Astronomy at the University of Chile	JPL · 109097

== 109101–109200 ==
back to top

Named minor planet	Provisional	This minor planet was named for...	Ref · Catalog
There are no named minor planets in this number range

== 109201–109300 ==
back to top

Named minor planet	Provisional	This minor planet was named for...	Ref · Catalog
There are no named minor planets in this number range

== 109301–109400 ==
back to top

Named minor planet	Provisional	This minor planet was named for...	Ref · Catalog
109330 Clemente	2001 QW_{142}	Roberto Clemente (1934–1972) was a Puerto Rican professional baseball player who played 18 seasons for the Pittsburgh Pirates. He died in a plane crash attempting to deliver supplies to earthquake victims in Managua, Nicaragua. He was the first Latin American player enshrined in the Hall of Fame.	JPL · 109330

== 109401–109500 ==
back to top

Named minor planet	Provisional	This minor planet was named for...	Ref · Catalog
109435 Giraud	2001 QB_{197}	Jean Giraud (1938–2012) was a French artist, cartoonist, and writer. Using an abstract and often surreal style, he produced a wide range of science fiction and fantasy works. He also contributed storyboards and concept designs to films such as Alien, The Fifth Element, Heavy Metal, the Abyss and Tron.	JPL · 109435

== 109501–109600 ==
back to top

Named minor planet	Provisional	This minor planet was named for...	Ref · Catalog
109573 Mishasmirnov	2001 QQ_{269}	Mikhail Alexandrovich Smirnov (1954–2006) was a Russian astronomer who researched small Solar System bodies, artificial satellites and the evolution of galaxies. He was on the staff of the Institute of Astronomy of the Russian Academy of Sciences and also popularized astronomy in Russia.	JPL · 109573

== 109601–109700 ==
back to top

Named minor planet	Provisional	This minor planet was named for...	Ref · Catalog
There are no named minor planets in this number range

== 109701–109800 ==
back to top

Named minor planet	Provisional	This minor planet was named for...	Ref · Catalog
109712 Giger	2001 RH_{46}	H. R. Giger (1940–2014), a Swiss painter, sculptor, set designer and film director. His themes included science fiction, the occult, and fantasy. He was part of a team that won an Academy Award for Best Achievement in Visual Effects for its work on the film Alien.	JPL · 109712

== 109801–109900 ==
back to top

Named minor planet	Provisional	This minor planet was named for...	Ref · Catalog
109879 Letelier	2001 SL	Patricio Letelier (1943–2011), a Chilean mathematician and physicist whose work contributed to general relativity, concerning black holes, chaos, topological defects, and exact solutions of the Einstein field equations	JPL · 109879

== 109901–110000 ==
back to top

Named minor planet	Provisional	This minor planet was named for...	Ref · Catalog
There are no named minor planets in this number range

back to top

Preceded by 108,001–109,000	Meanings of minor-planet names List of minor planets: 109,001–110,000	Succeeded by 110,001–111,000
