= List of minor planets: 109001–110000 =

The following is a partial list of minor planets, running from minor-planet number 109001 through 110000, inclusive. The primary data for this and other partial lists is based on JPL's "Small-Body Orbital Elements" and data available from the Minor Planet Center. Critical list information is also provided by the MPC, unless otherwise specified from Lowell Observatory. A detailed description of the table's columns and additional sources are given on the main page including a complete list of every page in this series, and a statistical break-up on the dynamical classification of minor planets.

Also see the summary list of all named bodies in numerical and alphabetical order, and the corresponding naming citations for the number range of this particular list. New namings may only be added to this list after official publication, as the preannouncement of names is condemned by the Working Group for Small Bodies Nomenclature of the International Astronomical Union.

Near-Earth obj.	MBA (inner)	MBA (outer)	Centaur
Mars-crosser	MBA (middle)	Jupiter trojan	Trans-Neptunian obj.
Unclassified

== 109001–109100 ==
Designation			Discovery			Properties		Ref
Permanent	Provisional	Named after	Date	Site	Discoverer(s)	Category	Diam.	Ref
109001	2001 PF_{65}	—	August 11, 2001	Haleakala	NEAT	·	2.4 km	MPC · JPL
109002	2001 PS_{65}	—	August 13, 2001	Haleakala	NEAT	·	2.3 km	MPC · JPL
109003	2001 PX_{65}	—	August 15, 2001	Haleakala	NEAT	NYS	1.5 km	MPC · JPL
109004	2001 PZ_{65}	—	August 15, 2001	Haleakala	NEAT	·	4.5 km	MPC · JPL
109005	2001 QP_{1}	—	August 16, 2001	Socorro	LINEAR	(43176)	4.5 km	MPC · JPL
109006	2001 QT_{1}	—	August 16, 2001	Socorro	LINEAR	·	1.9 km	MPC · JPL
109007	2001 QN_{2}	—	August 17, 2001	Reedy Creek	J. Broughton	(5)	2.7 km	MPC · JPL
109008	2001 QO_{2}	—	August 17, 2001	Reedy Creek	J. Broughton	·	2.6 km	MPC · JPL
109009	2001 QX_{2}	—	August 16, 2001	Socorro	LINEAR	NYS	2.9 km	MPC · JPL
109010	2001 QR_{3}	—	August 16, 2001	Socorro	LINEAR	·	2.2 km	MPC · JPL
109011	2001 QW_{3}	—	August 16, 2001	Socorro	LINEAR	·	2.6 km	MPC · JPL
109012	2001 QY_{3}	—	August 16, 2001	Socorro	LINEAR	NEM	5.4 km	MPC · JPL
109013	2001 QS_{4}	—	August 16, 2001	Socorro	LINEAR	moon	5.7 km	MPC · JPL
109014	2001 QV_{4}	—	August 16, 2001	Socorro	LINEAR	·	1.9 km	MPC · JPL
109015	2001 QX_{4}	—	August 16, 2001	Socorro	LINEAR	·	2.9 km	MPC · JPL
109016	2001 QG_{5}	—	August 16, 2001	Socorro	LINEAR	·	1.9 km	MPC · JPL
109017	2001 QT_{5}	—	August 16, 2001	Socorro	LINEAR	·	2.1 km	MPC · JPL
109018	2001 QA_{6}	—	August 16, 2001	Socorro	LINEAR	·	2.7 km	MPC · JPL
109019	2001 QT_{6}	—	August 16, 2001	Socorro	LINEAR	·	4.8 km	MPC · JPL
109020	2001 QN_{7}	—	August 16, 2001	Socorro	LINEAR	·	2.7 km	MPC · JPL
109021	2001 QV_{7}	—	August 16, 2001	Socorro	LINEAR	V	1.1 km	MPC · JPL
109022	2001 QY_{7}	—	August 16, 2001	Socorro	LINEAR	EOS	4.8 km	MPC · JPL
109023	2001 QF_{8}	—	August 16, 2001	Socorro	LINEAR	·	5.0 km	MPC · JPL
109024	2001 QS_{8}	—	August 16, 2001	Socorro	LINEAR	EMA	7.7 km	MPC · JPL
109025	2001 QC_{9}	—	August 16, 2001	Socorro	LINEAR	·	3.2 km	MPC · JPL
109026	2001 QG_{9}	—	August 16, 2001	Socorro	LINEAR	HYG	7.5 km	MPC · JPL
109027	2001 QQ_{9}	—	August 16, 2001	Socorro	LINEAR	AEO	2.9 km	MPC · JPL
109028	2001 QX_{9}	—	August 16, 2001	Socorro	LINEAR	·	5.2 km	MPC · JPL
109029	2001 QF_{10}	—	August 16, 2001	Socorro	LINEAR	·	2.5 km	MPC · JPL
109030	2001 QL_{10}	—	August 16, 2001	Socorro	LINEAR	NYS ·	3.5 km	MPC · JPL
109031	2001 QZ_{10}	—	August 16, 2001	Socorro	LINEAR	EUN	2.3 km	MPC · JPL
109032	2001 QK_{11}	—	August 16, 2001	Socorro	LINEAR	·	8.0 km	MPC · JPL
109033	2001 QU_{11}	—	August 16, 2001	Socorro	LINEAR	·	2.3 km	MPC · JPL
109034	2001 QV_{11}	—	August 16, 2001	Socorro	LINEAR	NYS	2.4 km	MPC · JPL
109035	2001 QE_{12}	—	August 16, 2001	Socorro	LINEAR	·	4.4 km	MPC · JPL
109036	2001 QO_{12}	—	August 16, 2001	Socorro	LINEAR	·	5.9 km	MPC · JPL
109037	2001 QQ_{12}	—	August 16, 2001	Socorro	LINEAR	·	2.6 km	MPC · JPL
109038	2001 QC_{13}	—	August 16, 2001	Socorro	LINEAR	NYS	2.1 km	MPC · JPL
109039	2001 QE_{13}	—	August 16, 2001	Socorro	LINEAR	(5)	2.8 km	MPC · JPL
109040	2001 QP_{13}	—	August 16, 2001	Socorro	LINEAR	·	2.4 km	MPC · JPL
109041	2001 QU_{13}	—	August 16, 2001	Socorro	LINEAR	·	2.4 km	MPC · JPL
109042	2001 QB_{14}	—	August 16, 2001	Socorro	LINEAR	(5)	2.6 km	MPC · JPL
109043	2001 QM_{14}	—	August 16, 2001	Socorro	LINEAR	·	2.6 km	MPC · JPL
109044	2001 QN_{14}	—	August 16, 2001	Socorro	LINEAR	·	1.8 km	MPC · JPL
109045	2001 QP_{14}	—	August 16, 2001	Socorro	LINEAR	·	2.5 km	MPC · JPL
109046	2001 QQ_{14}	—	August 16, 2001	Socorro	LINEAR	·	2.1 km	MPC · JPL
109047	2001 QS_{14}	—	August 16, 2001	Socorro	LINEAR	·	2.3 km	MPC · JPL
109048	2001 QT_{14}	—	August 16, 2001	Socorro	LINEAR	·	3.1 km	MPC · JPL
109049	2001 QY_{14}	—	August 16, 2001	Socorro	LINEAR	·	3.6 km	MPC · JPL
109050	2001 QB_{15}	—	August 16, 2001	Socorro	LINEAR	·	4.5 km	MPC · JPL
109051	2001 QK_{15}	—	August 16, 2001	Socorro	LINEAR	NYS	2.0 km	MPC · JPL
109052	2001 QL_{15}	—	August 16, 2001	Socorro	LINEAR	·	3.2 km	MPC · JPL
109053	2001 QG_{16}	—	August 16, 2001	Socorro	LINEAR	(5)	3.2 km	MPC · JPL
109054	2001 QH_{16}	—	August 16, 2001	Socorro	LINEAR	NYS	2.3 km	MPC · JPL
109055	2001 QP_{16}	—	August 16, 2001	Socorro	LINEAR	EUP	6.1 km	MPC · JPL
109056	2001 QX_{16}	—	August 16, 2001	Socorro	LINEAR	·	2.1 km	MPC · JPL
109057	2001 QT_{17}	—	August 16, 2001	Socorro	LINEAR	·	1.7 km	MPC · JPL
109058	2001 QV_{17}	—	August 16, 2001	Socorro	LINEAR	·	2.6 km	MPC · JPL
109059	2001 QX_{17}	—	August 16, 2001	Socorro	LINEAR	·	3.7 km	MPC · JPL
109060	2001 QA_{18}	—	August 16, 2001	Socorro	LINEAR	·	2.1 km	MPC · JPL
109061	2001 QE_{18}	—	August 16, 2001	Socorro	LINEAR	EOS	4.6 km	MPC · JPL
109062	2001 QM_{19}	—	August 16, 2001	Socorro	LINEAR	·	1.6 km	MPC · JPL
109063	2001 QP_{20}	—	August 16, 2001	Socorro	LINEAR	·	5.1 km	MPC · JPL
109064	2001 QR_{20}	—	August 16, 2001	Socorro	LINEAR	·	11 km	MPC · JPL
109065	2001 QU_{20}	—	August 16, 2001	Socorro	LINEAR	·	2.6 km	MPC · JPL
109066	2001 QE_{21}	—	August 16, 2001	Socorro	LINEAR	·	2.9 km	MPC · JPL
109067	2001 QO_{21}	—	August 16, 2001	Socorro	LINEAR	·	3.8 km	MPC · JPL
109068	2001 QT_{21}	—	August 16, 2001	Socorro	LINEAR	·	2.4 km	MPC · JPL
109069	2001 QZ_{21}	—	August 16, 2001	Socorro	LINEAR	V	3.2 km	MPC · JPL
109070	2001 QD_{22}	—	August 16, 2001	Socorro	LINEAR	EUN	4.8 km	MPC · JPL
109071	2001 QO_{22}	—	August 16, 2001	Socorro	LINEAR	·	2.7 km	MPC · JPL
109072	2001 QN_{23}	—	August 16, 2001	Socorro	LINEAR	PHO	4.2 km	MPC · JPL
109073	2001 QY_{23}	—	August 16, 2001	Socorro	LINEAR	·	2.7 km	MPC · JPL
109074	2001 QG_{24}	—	August 16, 2001	Socorro	LINEAR	·	2.1 km	MPC · JPL
109075	2001 QO_{24}	—	August 16, 2001	Socorro	LINEAR	EUN	2.1 km	MPC · JPL
109076	2001 QS_{24}	—	August 16, 2001	Socorro	LINEAR	·	8.6 km	MPC · JPL
109077	2001 QR_{25}	—	August 16, 2001	Socorro	LINEAR	·	2.5 km	MPC · JPL
109078	2001 QA_{26}	—	August 16, 2001	Socorro	LINEAR	·	2.5 km	MPC · JPL
109079	2001 QE_{26}	—	August 16, 2001	Socorro	LINEAR	PHO	3.0 km	MPC · JPL
109080	2001 QM_{26}	—	August 16, 2001	Socorro	LINEAR	·	2.9 km	MPC · JPL
109081	2001 QA_{27}	—	August 16, 2001	Socorro	LINEAR	·	2.0 km	MPC · JPL
109082	2001 QB_{27}	—	August 16, 2001	Socorro	LINEAR	V	1.6 km	MPC · JPL
109083	2001 QE_{27}	—	August 16, 2001	Socorro	LINEAR	·	3.8 km	MPC · JPL
109084	2001 QH_{27}	—	August 16, 2001	Socorro	LINEAR	·	3.7 km	MPC · JPL
109085	2001 QF_{28}	—	August 16, 2001	Socorro	LINEAR	NYS	3.4 km	MPC · JPL
109086	2001 QY_{28}	—	August 16, 2001	Socorro	LINEAR	·	3.2 km	MPC · JPL
109087	2001 QE_{29}	—	August 16, 2001	Socorro	LINEAR	slow	6.4 km	MPC · JPL
109088	2001 QL_{29}	—	August 16, 2001	Socorro	LINEAR	(5)	2.7 km	MPC · JPL
109089	2001 QT_{29}	—	August 16, 2001	Socorro	LINEAR	·	4.0 km	MPC · JPL
109090	2001 QX_{29}	—	August 16, 2001	Socorro	LINEAR	EUN	2.6 km	MPC · JPL
109091	2001 QA_{31}	—	August 16, 2001	Socorro	LINEAR	·	6.8 km	MPC · JPL
109092	2001 QG_{31}	—	August 16, 2001	Socorro	LINEAR	TIR	7.6 km	MPC · JPL
109093	2001 QS_{31}	—	August 16, 2001	Socorro	LINEAR	·	2.8 km	MPC · JPL
109094	2001 QX_{31}	—	August 16, 2001	Socorro	LINEAR	(5)	2.5 km	MPC · JPL
109095	2001 QB_{33}	—	August 17, 2001	Palomar	NEAT	·	1.9 km	MPC · JPL
109096	2001 QJ_{33}	—	August 16, 2001	Ondřejov	P. Kušnirák, U. Babiaková	·	3.3 km	MPC · JPL
109097 Hamuy	2001 QM_{33}	Hamuy	August 19, 2001	Pla D'Arguines	R. Ferrando	·	3.3 km	MPC · JPL
109098	2001 QG_{34}	—	August 19, 2001	Reedy Creek	J. Broughton	·	2.3 km	MPC · JPL
109099	2001 QW_{34}	—	August 16, 2001	Socorro	LINEAR	·	2.6 km	MPC · JPL
109100	2001 QG_{35}	—	August 16, 2001	Socorro	LINEAR	ERI	3.6 km	MPC · JPL

== 109101–109200 ==
back to top

Designation			Discovery			Properties		Ref
Permanent	Provisional	Named after	Date	Site	Discoverer(s)	Category	Diam.	Ref
109101	2001 QH_{35}	—	August 16, 2001	Socorro	LINEAR	·	4.5 km	MPC · JPL
109102	2001 QR_{35}	—	August 16, 2001	Socorro	LINEAR	·	7.1 km	MPC · JPL
109103	2001 QW_{35}	—	August 16, 2001	Socorro	LINEAR	HYG	5.2 km	MPC · JPL
109104	2001 QV_{36}	—	August 16, 2001	Socorro	LINEAR	PHO	3.3 km	MPC · JPL
109105	2001 QP_{37}	—	August 16, 2001	Socorro	LINEAR	·	3.3 km	MPC · JPL
109106	2001 QU_{37}	—	August 16, 2001	Socorro	LINEAR	·	3.1 km	MPC · JPL
109107	2001 QB_{38}	—	August 16, 2001	Socorro	LINEAR	·	3.7 km	MPC · JPL
109108	2001 QG_{38}	—	August 16, 2001	Socorro	LINEAR	·	2.3 km	MPC · JPL
109109	2001 QU_{38}	—	August 16, 2001	Socorro	LINEAR	·	3.6 km	MPC · JPL
109110	2001 QW_{38}	—	August 16, 2001	Socorro	LINEAR	·	2.9 km	MPC · JPL
109111	2001 QD_{39}	—	August 16, 2001	Socorro	LINEAR	·	9.8 km	MPC · JPL
109112	2001 QR_{39}	—	August 16, 2001	Socorro	LINEAR	·	2.7 km	MPC · JPL
109113	2001 QB_{41}	—	August 16, 2001	Socorro	LINEAR	·	2.1 km	MPC · JPL
109114	2001 QE_{41}	—	August 16, 2001	Socorro	LINEAR	URS	7.8 km	MPC · JPL
109115	2001 QV_{41}	—	August 16, 2001	Socorro	LINEAR	NYS	1.9 km	MPC · JPL
109116	2001 QD_{42}	—	August 16, 2001	Socorro	LINEAR	·	3.0 km	MPC · JPL
109117	2001 QE_{42}	—	August 16, 2001	Socorro	LINEAR	(5)	2.6 km	MPC · JPL
109118	2001 QH_{42}	—	August 16, 2001	Socorro	LINEAR	·	2.5 km	MPC · JPL
109119	2001 QB_{43}	—	August 16, 2001	Socorro	LINEAR	·	4.7 km	MPC · JPL
109120	2001 QO_{43}	—	August 16, 2001	Socorro	LINEAR	·	6.5 km	MPC · JPL
109121	2001 QU_{43}	—	August 16, 2001	Socorro	LINEAR	·	3.0 km	MPC · JPL
109122	2001 QZ_{43}	—	August 16, 2001	Socorro	LINEAR	·	8.6 km	MPC · JPL
109123	2001 QX_{44}	—	August 16, 2001	Socorro	LINEAR	(5)	2.8 km	MPC · JPL
109124	2001 QT_{45}	—	August 16, 2001	Socorro	LINEAR	EOS	4.3 km	MPC · JPL
109125	2001 QT_{46}	—	August 16, 2001	Socorro	LINEAR	EOS	4.1 km	MPC · JPL
109126	2001 QK_{48}	—	August 16, 2001	Socorro	LINEAR	·	3.8 km	MPC · JPL
109127	2001 QQ_{48}	—	August 16, 2001	Socorro	LINEAR	·	2.3 km	MPC · JPL
109128	2001 QW_{48}	—	August 16, 2001	Socorro	LINEAR	·	2.7 km	MPC · JPL
109129	2001 QV_{49}	—	August 16, 2001	Socorro	LINEAR	·	1.9 km	MPC · JPL
109130	2001 QK_{51}	—	August 16, 2001	Socorro	LINEAR	·	2.4 km	MPC · JPL
109131	2001 QV_{51}	—	August 16, 2001	Socorro	LINEAR	·	2.3 km	MPC · JPL
109132	2001 QE_{52}	—	August 16, 2001	Socorro	LINEAR	·	7.0 km	MPC · JPL
109133	2001 QH_{52}	—	August 16, 2001	Socorro	LINEAR	THM	6.2 km	MPC · JPL
109134	2001 QF_{53}	—	August 16, 2001	Socorro	LINEAR	·	4.7 km	MPC · JPL
109135	2001 QK_{53}	—	August 16, 2001	Socorro	LINEAR	(5)	1.8 km	MPC · JPL
109136	2001 QM_{54}	—	August 16, 2001	Socorro	LINEAR	·	2.0 km	MPC · JPL
109137	2001 QO_{54}	—	August 16, 2001	Socorro	LINEAR	·	2.6 km	MPC · JPL
109138	2001 QF_{55}	—	August 16, 2001	Socorro	LINEAR	·	2.1 km	MPC · JPL
109139	2001 QJ_{55}	—	August 16, 2001	Socorro	LINEAR	·	2.5 km	MPC · JPL
109140	2001 QK_{55}	—	August 16, 2001	Socorro	LINEAR	MAR	2.2 km	MPC · JPL
109141	2001 QZ_{55}	—	August 16, 2001	Socorro	LINEAR	·	2.2 km	MPC · JPL
109142	2001 QP_{56}	—	August 16, 2001	Socorro	LINEAR	·	1.6 km	MPC · JPL
109143	2001 QC_{57}	—	August 16, 2001	Socorro	LINEAR	·	2.6 km	MPC · JPL
109144	2001 QN_{57}	—	August 16, 2001	Socorro	LINEAR	NYS	2.2 km	MPC · JPL
109145	2001 QO_{57}	—	August 16, 2001	Socorro	LINEAR	·	2.0 km	MPC · JPL
109146	2001 QS_{57}	—	August 16, 2001	Socorro	LINEAR	·	2.9 km	MPC · JPL
109147	2001 QZ_{57}	—	August 16, 2001	Socorro	LINEAR	SUL ·	4.1 km	MPC · JPL
109148	2001 QL_{58}	—	August 16, 2001	Socorro	LINEAR	·	2.6 km	MPC · JPL
109149	2001 QR_{58}	—	August 16, 2001	Socorro	LINEAR	MAR	3.1 km	MPC · JPL
109150	2001 QW_{58}	—	August 17, 2001	Socorro	LINEAR	·	2.0 km	MPC · JPL
109151	2001 QH_{59}	—	August 17, 2001	Socorro	LINEAR	·	2.8 km	MPC · JPL
109152	2001 QA_{60}	—	August 18, 2001	Socorro	LINEAR	(5)	2.4 km	MPC · JPL
109153	2001 QH_{60}	—	August 18, 2001	Socorro	LINEAR	·	6.7 km	MPC · JPL
109154	2001 QN_{60}	—	August 18, 2001	Socorro	LINEAR	·	2.1 km	MPC · JPL
109155	2001 QR_{60}	—	August 16, 2001	Palomar	NEAT	·	7.9 km	MPC · JPL
109156	2001 QV_{60}	—	August 16, 2001	Socorro	LINEAR	MAR	2.1 km	MPC · JPL
109157	2001 QW_{60}	—	August 17, 2001	Socorro	LINEAR	EOS	4.7 km	MPC · JPL
109158	2001 QW_{61}	—	August 16, 2001	Socorro	LINEAR	·	3.8 km	MPC · JPL
109159	2001 QY_{61}	—	August 16, 2001	Socorro	LINEAR	NYS	2.6 km	MPC · JPL
109160	2001 QM_{62}	—	August 16, 2001	Socorro	LINEAR	·	2.2 km	MPC · JPL
109161	2001 QN_{62}	—	August 16, 2001	Socorro	LINEAR	·	1.6 km	MPC · JPL
109162	2001 QW_{62}	—	August 16, 2001	Socorro	LINEAR	V	1.2 km	MPC · JPL
109163	2001 QX_{62}	—	August 16, 2001	Socorro	LINEAR	·	2.8 km	MPC · JPL
109164	2001 QA_{63}	—	August 16, 2001	Socorro	LINEAR	·	2.1 km	MPC · JPL
109165	2001 QF_{63}	—	August 16, 2001	Socorro	LINEAR	NYS	2.2 km	MPC · JPL
109166	2001 QH_{63}	—	August 16, 2001	Socorro	LINEAR	·	5.3 km	MPC · JPL
109167	2001 QO_{63}	—	August 16, 2001	Socorro	LINEAR	(5)	2.2 km	MPC · JPL
109168	2001 QE_{64}	—	August 16, 2001	Socorro	LINEAR	·	3.2 km	MPC · JPL
109169	2001 QF_{64}	—	August 16, 2001	Socorro	LINEAR	slow	3.1 km	MPC · JPL
109170	2001 QK_{64}	—	August 16, 2001	Socorro	LINEAR	(5)	2.5 km	MPC · JPL
109171	2001 QP_{64}	—	August 16, 2001	Socorro	LINEAR	EUN	2.3 km	MPC · JPL
109172	2001 QT_{64}	—	August 16, 2001	Socorro	LINEAR	·	3.3 km	MPC · JPL
109173	2001 QZ_{64}	—	August 16, 2001	Socorro	LINEAR	·	3.9 km	MPC · JPL
109174	2001 QS_{65}	—	August 17, 2001	Socorro	LINEAR	·	3.3 km	MPC · JPL
109175	2001 QB_{66}	—	August 17, 2001	Socorro	LINEAR	·	1.5 km	MPC · JPL
109176	2001 QE_{66}	—	August 17, 2001	Socorro	LINEAR	·	3.6 km	MPC · JPL
109177	2001 QL_{66}	—	August 17, 2001	Socorro	LINEAR	V	1.9 km	MPC · JPL
109178	2001 QS_{66}	—	August 17, 2001	Socorro	LINEAR	·	6.8 km	MPC · JPL
109179	2001 QX_{66}	—	August 18, 2001	Socorro	LINEAR	·	2.4 km	MPC · JPL
109180	2001 QD_{67}	—	August 18, 2001	Socorro	LINEAR	·	8.4 km	MPC · JPL
109181	2001 QN_{67}	—	August 19, 2001	Socorro	LINEAR	·	3.0 km	MPC · JPL
109182	2001 QV_{67}	—	August 19, 2001	Socorro	LINEAR	·	5.7 km	MPC · JPL
109183	2001 QO_{68}	—	August 20, 2001	Oakley	Wolfe, C.	·	3.3 km	MPC · JPL
109184	2001 QE_{69}	—	August 17, 2001	Socorro	LINEAR	HIL · 3:2	10 km	MPC · JPL
109185	2001 QA_{70}	—	August 17, 2001	Socorro	LINEAR	·	3.0 km	MPC · JPL
109186	2001 QB_{70}	—	August 17, 2001	Socorro	LINEAR	·	2.7 km	MPC · JPL
109187	2001 QK_{71}	—	August 16, 2001	Palomar	NEAT	V	1.3 km	MPC · JPL
109188	2001 QE_{72}	—	August 21, 2001	Desert Eagle	W. K. Y. Yeung	·	3.6 km	MPC · JPL
109189	2001 QT_{72}	—	August 19, 2001	Haleakala	NEAT	·	2.0 km	MPC · JPL
109190	2001 QK_{73}	—	August 19, 2001	Socorro	LINEAR	·	7.1 km	MPC · JPL
109191	2001 QS_{73}	—	August 16, 2001	Socorro	LINEAR	(5)	3.4 km	MPC · JPL
109192	2001 QU_{73}	—	August 16, 2001	Socorro	LINEAR	·	3.4 km	MPC · JPL
109193	2001 QL_{74}	—	August 16, 2001	Socorro	LINEAR	·	4.4 km	MPC · JPL
109194	2001 QB_{75}	—	August 16, 2001	Socorro	LINEAR	·	7.1 km	MPC · JPL
109195	2001 QE_{75}	—	August 16, 2001	Socorro	LINEAR	HNS	2.8 km	MPC · JPL
109196	2001 QA_{76}	—	August 16, 2001	Socorro	LINEAR	·	2.6 km	MPC · JPL
109197	2001 QN_{76}	—	August 16, 2001	Socorro	LINEAR	(5)	3.1 km	MPC · JPL
109198	2001 QP_{76}	—	August 16, 2001	Socorro	LINEAR	·	3.4 km	MPC · JPL
109199	2001 QV_{77}	—	August 16, 2001	Socorro	LINEAR	GEF	3.3 km	MPC · JPL
109200	2001 QA_{78}	—	August 16, 2001	Socorro	LINEAR	·	3.6 km	MPC · JPL

== 109201–109300 ==
back to top

Designation			Discovery			Properties		Ref
Permanent	Provisional	Named after	Date	Site	Discoverer(s)	Category	Diam.	Ref
109201	2001 QH_{78}	—	August 16, 2001	Socorro	LINEAR	·	3.8 km	MPC · JPL
109202	2001 QQ_{79}	—	August 16, 2001	Socorro	LINEAR	·	3.6 km	MPC · JPL
109203	2001 QY_{79}	—	August 16, 2001	Socorro	LINEAR	·	2.6 km	MPC · JPL
109204	2001 QE_{81}	—	August 17, 2001	Socorro	LINEAR	slow	3.2 km	MPC · JPL
109205	2001 QP_{81}	—	August 17, 2001	Socorro	LINEAR	·	2.1 km	MPC · JPL
109206	2001 QL_{82}	—	August 17, 2001	Socorro	LINEAR	·	3.8 km	MPC · JPL
109207	2001 QQ_{82}	—	August 17, 2001	Socorro	LINEAR	·	6.0 km	MPC · JPL
109208	2001 QT_{82}	—	August 17, 2001	Socorro	LINEAR	·	4.1 km	MPC · JPL
109209	2001 QX_{82}	—	August 17, 2001	Socorro	LINEAR	·	3.3 km	MPC · JPL
109210	2001 QJ_{83}	—	August 17, 2001	Socorro	LINEAR	GEF	2.5 km	MPC · JPL
109211	2001 QO_{83}	—	August 17, 2001	Socorro	LINEAR	(5)	3.0 km	MPC · JPL
109212	2001 QR_{83}	—	August 17, 2001	Socorro	LINEAR	·	3.0 km	MPC · JPL
109213	2001 QT_{84}	—	August 18, 2001	Socorro	LINEAR	·	3.9 km	MPC · JPL
109214	2001 QJ_{85}	—	August 19, 2001	Socorro	LINEAR	·	8.4 km	MPC · JPL
109215	2001 QP_{85}	—	August 19, 2001	Socorro	LINEAR	MAR	2.5 km	MPC · JPL
109216	2001 QU_{85}	—	August 22, 2001	Desert Eagle	W. K. Y. Yeung	·	2.6 km	MPC · JPL
109217	2001 QX_{85}	—	August 22, 2001	Desert Eagle	W. K. Y. Yeung	·	2.1 km	MPC · JPL
109218	2001 QM_{86}	—	August 16, 2001	Palomar	NEAT	·	3.4 km	MPC · JPL
109219	2001 QT_{86}	—	August 16, 2001	Palomar	NEAT	·	3.4 km	MPC · JPL
109220	2001 QE_{87}	—	August 17, 2001	Palomar	NEAT	·	8.6 km	MPC · JPL
109221	2001 QM_{87}	—	August 17, 2001	Palomar	NEAT	MAR	2.1 km	MPC · JPL
109222	2001 QN_{87}	—	August 17, 2001	Palomar	NEAT	EUN	2.6 km	MPC · JPL
109223	2001 QW_{87}	—	August 22, 2001	Needville	Needville	·	2.1 km	MPC · JPL
109224	2001 QE_{89}	—	August 22, 2001	Desert Eagle	W. K. Y. Yeung	·	3.9 km	MPC · JPL
109225	2001 QH_{89}	—	August 16, 2001	Palomar	NEAT	·	2.7 km	MPC · JPL
109226	2001 QH_{91}	—	August 22, 2001	Socorro	LINEAR	·	4.0 km	MPC · JPL
109227	2001 QB_{92}	—	August 19, 2001	Socorro	LINEAR	·	4.0 km	MPC · JPL
109228	2001 QN_{92}	—	August 22, 2001	Socorro	LINEAR	·	4.7 km	MPC · JPL
109229	2001 QC_{93}	—	August 22, 2001	Socorro	LINEAR	·	9.0 km	MPC · JPL
109230	2001 QD_{93}	—	August 22, 2001	Socorro	LINEAR	·	3.2 km	MPC · JPL
109231	2001 QF_{93}	—	August 22, 2001	Socorro	LINEAR	·	4.0 km	MPC · JPL
109232	2001 QJ_{93}	—	August 22, 2001	Socorro	LINEAR	·	2.8 km	MPC · JPL
109233	2001 QV_{93}	—	August 22, 2001	Socorro	LINEAR	·	12 km	MPC · JPL
109234	2001 QX_{93}	—	August 22, 2001	Socorro	LINEAR	EUN	4.0 km	MPC · JPL
109235	2001 QH_{94}	—	August 23, 2001	Desert Eagle	W. K. Y. Yeung	·	2.2 km	MPC · JPL
109236	2001 QR_{94}	—	August 23, 2001	Desert Eagle	W. K. Y. Yeung	EUN	2.5 km	MPC · JPL
109237	2001 QT_{96}	—	August 16, 2001	Socorro	LINEAR	·	2.7 km	MPC · JPL
109238	2001 QX_{96}	—	August 17, 2001	Socorro	LINEAR	(5)	2.3 km	MPC · JPL
109239	2001 QP_{97}	—	August 17, 2001	Socorro	LINEAR	·	7.6 km	MPC · JPL
109240	2001 QD_{98}	—	August 19, 2001	Socorro	LINEAR	·	6.8 km	MPC · JPL
109241	2001 QH_{98}	—	August 19, 2001	Socorro	LINEAR	·	2.4 km	MPC · JPL
109242	2001 QT_{98}	—	August 20, 2001	Socorro	LINEAR	·	4.2 km	MPC · JPL
109243	2001 QV_{98}	—	August 21, 2001	Socorro	LINEAR	·	8.2 km	MPC · JPL
109244	2001 QZ_{98}	—	August 22, 2001	Socorro	LINEAR	slow	2.4 km	MPC · JPL
109245	2001 QE_{99}	—	August 22, 2001	Socorro	LINEAR	·	4.5 km	MPC · JPL
109246	2001 QP_{99}	—	August 16, 2001	Socorro	LINEAR	·	4.7 km	MPC · JPL
109247	2001 QN_{101}	—	August 18, 2001	Socorro	LINEAR	·	1.8 km	MPC · JPL
109248	2001 QV_{101}	—	August 18, 2001	Socorro	LINEAR	EUN	2.2 km	MPC · JPL
109249	2001 QV_{102}	—	August 19, 2001	Socorro	LINEAR	·	6.9 km	MPC · JPL
109250	2001 QX_{102}	—	August 19, 2001	Socorro	LINEAR	·	6.9 km	MPC · JPL
109251	2001 QY_{102}	—	August 19, 2001	Socorro	LINEAR	NYS	1.7 km	MPC · JPL
109252	2001 QC_{103}	—	August 19, 2001	Socorro	LINEAR	NYS	2.0 km	MPC · JPL
109253	2001 QT_{103}	—	August 19, 2001	Socorro	LINEAR	PHO	1.8 km	MPC · JPL
109254	2001 QJ_{104}	—	August 20, 2001	Socorro	LINEAR	·	3.4 km	MPC · JPL
109255	2001 QB_{105}	—	August 22, 2001	Socorro	LINEAR	(5)	2.7 km	MPC · JPL
109256	2001 QQ_{105}	—	August 23, 2001	Socorro	LINEAR	·	6.4 km	MPC · JPL
109257	2001 QR_{105}	—	August 23, 2001	Socorro	LINEAR	·	2.3 km	MPC · JPL
109258	2001 QY_{105}	—	August 18, 2001	Anderson Mesa	LONEOS	PHO	2.1 km	MPC · JPL
109259	2001 QB_{106}	—	August 18, 2001	Anderson Mesa	LONEOS	EUN ·	4.2 km	MPC · JPL
109260	2001 QT_{106}	—	August 21, 2001	Socorro	LINEAR	·	1.7 km	MPC · JPL
109261	2001 QB_{108}	—	August 25, 2001	Anderson Mesa	LONEOS	·	6.0 km	MPC · JPL
109262	2001 QE_{108}	—	August 25, 2001	Anderson Mesa	LONEOS	·	7.5 km	MPC · JPL
109263	2001 QO_{108}	—	August 24, 2001	OCA-Anza	White, M., M. Collins	EOS	3.9 km	MPC · JPL
109264	2001 QJ_{109}	—	August 20, 2001	Haleakala	NEAT	·	4.0 km	MPC · JPL
109265	2001 QX_{109}	—	August 21, 2001	Haleakala	NEAT	EUP	7.9 km	MPC · JPL
109266	2001 QL_{110}	—	August 19, 2001	Ondřejov	P. Kušnirák	L5	10 km	MPC · JPL
109267	2001 QM_{111}	—	August 26, 2001	Farpoint	Farpoint	·	4.4 km	MPC · JPL
109268	2001 QQ_{111}	—	August 22, 2001	Socorro	LINEAR	·	8.2 km	MPC · JPL
109269	2001 QR_{111}	—	August 22, 2001	Socorro	LINEAR	·	3.1 km	MPC · JPL
109270	2001 QA_{112}	—	August 24, 2001	Socorro	LINEAR	TEL	3.9 km	MPC · JPL
109271	2001 QQ_{112}	—	August 25, 2001	Socorro	LINEAR	EUN	2.3 km	MPC · JPL
109272	2001 QY_{112}	—	August 25, 2001	Socorro	LINEAR	EOS	4.6 km	MPC · JPL
109273	2001 QG_{114}	—	August 17, 2001	Socorro	LINEAR	·	4.3 km	MPC · JPL
109274	2001 QQ_{114}	—	August 17, 2001	Socorro	LINEAR	·	2.6 km	MPC · JPL
109275	2001 QX_{114}	—	August 17, 2001	Socorro	LINEAR	EUN	3.4 km	MPC · JPL
109276	2001 QN_{115}	—	August 17, 2001	Socorro	LINEAR	·	2.0 km	MPC · JPL
109277	2001 QO_{116}	—	August 17, 2001	Socorro	LINEAR	·	4.5 km	MPC · JPL
109278	2001 QP_{116}	—	August 17, 2001	Socorro	LINEAR	·	2.5 km	MPC · JPL
109279	2001 QF_{118}	—	August 17, 2001	Socorro	LINEAR	·	2.6 km	MPC · JPL
109280	2001 QO_{118}	—	August 17, 2001	Socorro	LINEAR	·	3.5 km	MPC · JPL
109281	2001 QX_{118}	—	August 17, 2001	Socorro	LINEAR	·	4.8 km	MPC · JPL
109282	2001 QU_{119}	—	August 18, 2001	Socorro	LINEAR	·	2.9 km	MPC · JPL
109283	2001 QY_{119}	—	August 18, 2001	Socorro	LINEAR	·	1.8 km	MPC · JPL
109284	2001 QP_{120}	—	August 19, 2001	Socorro	LINEAR	·	4.6 km	MPC · JPL
109285	2001 QR_{120}	—	August 19, 2001	Socorro	LINEAR	ADE ·	5.1 km	MPC · JPL
109286	2001 QR_{121}	—	August 19, 2001	Socorro	LINEAR	·	7.5 km	MPC · JPL
109287	2001 QF_{122}	—	August 19, 2001	Socorro	LINEAR	EOS	3.9 km	MPC · JPL
109288	2001 QY_{122}	—	August 19, 2001	Socorro	LINEAR	·	4.5 km	MPC · JPL
109289	2001 QB_{123}	—	August 19, 2001	Socorro	LINEAR	TEL	2.9 km	MPC · JPL
109290	2001 QG_{123}	—	August 19, 2001	Socorro	LINEAR	NYS	2.1 km	MPC · JPL
109291	2001 QN_{123}	—	August 19, 2001	Socorro	LINEAR	·	3.6 km	MPC · JPL
109292	2001 QB_{124}	—	August 19, 2001	Socorro	LINEAR	NYS	2.2 km	MPC · JPL
109293	2001 QJ_{124}	—	August 19, 2001	Socorro	LINEAR	·	1.7 km	MPC · JPL
109294	2001 QN_{124}	—	August 19, 2001	Socorro	LINEAR	·	2.1 km	MPC · JPL
109295	2001 QQ_{124}	—	August 19, 2001	Socorro	LINEAR	·	5.6 km	MPC · JPL
109296	2001 QM_{125}	—	August 19, 2001	Socorro	LINEAR	·	5.9 km	MPC · JPL
109297	2001 QN_{127}	—	August 20, 2001	Socorro	LINEAR	PHO	3.2 km	MPC · JPL
109298	2001 QQ_{127}	—	August 20, 2001	Socorro	LINEAR	·	2.7 km	MPC · JPL
109299	2001 QJ_{128}	—	August 20, 2001	Socorro	LINEAR	·	2.9 km	MPC · JPL
109300	2001 QK_{128}	—	August 20, 2001	Socorro	LINEAR	·	6.3 km	MPC · JPL

== 109301–109400 ==
back to top

Designation			Discovery			Properties		Ref
Permanent	Provisional	Named after	Date	Site	Discoverer(s)	Category	Diam.	Ref
109301	2001 QR_{128}	—	August 20, 2001	Socorro	LINEAR	EOS	4.0 km	MPC · JPL
109302	2001 QW_{129}	—	August 20, 2001	Socorro	LINEAR	EUN	3.3 km	MPC · JPL
109303	2001 QC_{130}	—	August 20, 2001	Socorro	LINEAR	V	1.4 km	MPC · JPL
109304	2001 QQ_{130}	—	August 20, 2001	Socorro	LINEAR	·	2.3 km	MPC · JPL
109305	2001 QG_{131}	—	August 20, 2001	Socorro	LINEAR	·	4.0 km	MPC · JPL
109306	2001 QO_{131}	—	August 20, 2001	Socorro	LINEAR	·	2.9 km	MPC · JPL
109307	2001 QZ_{131}	—	August 20, 2001	Socorro	LINEAR	·	2.4 km	MPC · JPL
109308	2001 QR_{132}	—	August 20, 2001	Socorro	LINEAR	·	2.8 km	MPC · JPL
109309	2001 QM_{133}	—	August 21, 2001	Socorro	LINEAR	·	5.0 km	MPC · JPL
109310	2001 QN_{133}	—	August 21, 2001	Socorro	LINEAR	·	2.5 km	MPC · JPL
109311	2001 QB_{134}	—	August 21, 2001	Socorro	LINEAR	·	5.8 km	MPC · JPL
109312	2001 QQ_{134}	—	August 22, 2001	Socorro	LINEAR	·	4.8 km	MPC · JPL
109313	2001 QR_{134}	—	August 22, 2001	Socorro	LINEAR	EOS	6.1 km	MPC · JPL
109314	2001 QU_{134}	—	August 22, 2001	Socorro	LINEAR	·	11 km	MPC · JPL
109315	2001 QM_{135}	—	August 22, 2001	Socorro	LINEAR	·	2.6 km	MPC · JPL
109316	2001 QO_{135}	—	August 22, 2001	Socorro	LINEAR	·	2.9 km	MPC · JPL
109317	2001 QB_{136}	—	August 22, 2001	Socorro	LINEAR	·	3.3 km	MPC · JPL
109318	2001 QU_{137}	—	August 22, 2001	Socorro	LINEAR	·	3.1 km	MPC · JPL
109319	2001 QC_{138}	—	August 22, 2001	Socorro	LINEAR	·	2.9 km	MPC · JPL
109320	2001 QD_{138}	—	August 22, 2001	Socorro	LINEAR	·	2.4 km	MPC · JPL
109321	2001 QS_{139}	—	August 22, 2001	Socorro	LINEAR	·	4.8 km	MPC · JPL
109322	2001 QU_{139}	—	August 22, 2001	Socorro	LINEAR	·	2.8 km	MPC · JPL
109323	2001 QW_{139}	—	August 22, 2001	Socorro	LINEAR	·	5.1 km	MPC · JPL
109324	2001 QA_{140}	—	August 22, 2001	Socorro	LINEAR	EUN	4.2 km	MPC · JPL
109325	2001 QH_{140}	—	August 22, 2001	Socorro	LINEAR	·	2.4 km	MPC · JPL
109326	2001 QN_{140}	—	August 22, 2001	Socorro	LINEAR	·	8.4 km	MPC · JPL
109327	2001 QU_{140}	—	August 22, 2001	Socorro	LINEAR	·	4.8 km	MPC · JPL
109328	2001 QE_{141}	—	August 23, 2001	Socorro	LINEAR	EUN	2.5 km	MPC · JPL
109329	2001 QG_{141}	—	August 24, 2001	Socorro	LINEAR	·	2.0 km	MPC · JPL
109330 Clemente	2001 QW_{142}	Clemente	August 24, 2001	Goodricke-Pigott	R. A. Tucker	·	3.8 km	MPC · JPL
109331	2001 QY_{142}	—	August 24, 2001	Goodricke-Pigott	R. A. Tucker	·	2.4 km	MPC · JPL
109332	2001 QD_{143}	—	August 21, 2001	Kitt Peak	Spacewatch	·	2.1 km	MPC · JPL
109333	2001 QE_{143}	—	August 21, 2001	Kitt Peak	Spacewatch	·	1.5 km	MPC · JPL
109334	2001 QL_{143}	—	August 21, 2001	Kitt Peak	Spacewatch	·	2.0 km	MPC · JPL
109335	2001 QP_{143}	—	August 21, 2001	Kitt Peak	Spacewatch	EOS	2.4 km	MPC · JPL
109336	2001 QF_{144}	—	August 21, 2001	Kitt Peak	Spacewatch	·	2.8 km	MPC · JPL
109337	2001 QZ_{146}	—	August 20, 2001	Palomar	NEAT	·	3.1 km	MPC · JPL
109338	2001 QW_{147}	—	August 20, 2001	Palomar	NEAT	·	4.0 km	MPC · JPL
109339	2001 QA_{148}	—	August 20, 2001	Palomar	NEAT	HNS	1.8 km	MPC · JPL
109340	2001 QF_{148}	—	August 20, 2001	Palomar	NEAT	·	4.2 km	MPC · JPL
109341	2001 QN_{148}	—	August 20, 2001	Haleakala	NEAT	EUN	2.3 km	MPC · JPL
109342	2001 QR_{148}	—	August 20, 2001	Haleakala	NEAT	·	6.4 km	MPC · JPL
109343	2001 QE_{149}	—	August 21, 2001	Haleakala	NEAT	AGN	2.2 km	MPC · JPL
109344	2001 QG_{149}	—	August 22, 2001	Haleakala	NEAT	·	3.4 km	MPC · JPL
109345	2001 QH_{150}	—	August 25, 2001	Palomar	NEAT	·	2.5 km	MPC · JPL
109346	2001 QK_{150}	—	August 27, 2001	Palomar	NEAT	·	2.6 km	MPC · JPL
109347	2001 QM_{151}	—	August 23, 2001	Socorro	LINEAR	H	1.5 km	MPC · JPL
109348	2001 QG_{152}	—	August 22, 2001	Desert Eagle	W. K. Y. Yeung	·	2.4 km	MPC · JPL
109349	2001 QH_{152}	—	August 23, 2001	Desert Eagle	W. K. Y. Yeung	·	2.2 km	MPC · JPL
109350	2001 QM_{152}	—	August 25, 2001	Desert Eagle	W. K. Y. Yeung	·	4.7 km	MPC · JPL
109351	2001 QX_{152}	—	August 27, 2001	Farpoint	G. Hug	·	2.4 km	MPC · JPL
109352	2001 QR_{153}	—	August 18, 2001	Kvistaberg	Uppsala-DLR Asteroid Survey	·	1.8 km	MPC · JPL
109353	2001 QS_{153}	—	August 26, 2001	Ondřejov	Ondrejov	·	2.5 km	MPC · JPL
109354	2001 QU_{153}	—	August 26, 2001	Ondřejov	P. Pravec, P. Kušnirák	·	2.5 km	MPC · JPL
109355	2001 QC_{154}	—	August 28, 2001	Farpoint	G. Hug	·	2.7 km	MPC · JPL
109356	2001 QF_{155}	—	August 23, 2001	Anderson Mesa	LONEOS	V	1.5 km	MPC · JPL
109357	2001 QM_{155}	—	August 23, 2001	Anderson Mesa	LONEOS	EUN	3.6 km	MPC · JPL
109358	2001 QR_{155}	—	August 23, 2001	Anderson Mesa	LONEOS	·	4.0 km	MPC · JPL
109359	2001 QZ_{155}	—	August 23, 2001	Anderson Mesa	LONEOS	·	2.5 km	MPC · JPL
109360	2001 QF_{156}	—	August 23, 2001	Anderson Mesa	LONEOS	EOS	3.5 km	MPC · JPL
109361	2001 QX_{156}	—	August 23, 2001	Anderson Mesa	LONEOS	·	3.0 km	MPC · JPL
109362	2001 QO_{157}	—	August 23, 2001	Anderson Mesa	LONEOS	V · slow?	1.4 km	MPC · JPL
109363	2001 QU_{157}	—	August 23, 2001	Anderson Mesa	LONEOS	·	4.2 km	MPC · JPL
109364	2001 QW_{157}	—	August 23, 2001	Anderson Mesa	LONEOS	·	2.1 km	MPC · JPL
109365	2001 QC_{158}	—	August 23, 2001	Anderson Mesa	LONEOS	·	2.6 km	MPC · JPL
109366	2001 QK_{158}	—	August 23, 2001	Anderson Mesa	LONEOS	·	1.9 km	MPC · JPL
109367	2001 QL_{158}	—	August 23, 2001	Anderson Mesa	LONEOS	·	2.3 km	MPC · JPL
109368	2001 QM_{158}	—	August 23, 2001	Anderson Mesa	LONEOS	CLA	3.2 km	MPC · JPL
109369	2001 QA_{159}	—	August 23, 2001	Anderson Mesa	LONEOS	·	6.8 km	MPC · JPL
109370	2001 QU_{159}	—	August 23, 2001	Anderson Mesa	LONEOS	·	2.8 km	MPC · JPL
109371	2001 QY_{159}	—	August 23, 2001	Anderson Mesa	LONEOS	·	1.9 km	MPC · JPL
109372	2001 QS_{160}	—	August 23, 2001	Anderson Mesa	LONEOS	(5)	2.3 km	MPC · JPL
109373	2001 QQ_{161}	—	August 23, 2001	Anderson Mesa	LONEOS	·	6.3 km	MPC · JPL
109374	2001 QF_{162}	—	August 23, 2001	Anderson Mesa	LONEOS	THM	4.9 km	MPC · JPL
109375	2001 QR_{162}	—	August 23, 2001	Anderson Mesa	LONEOS	EOS	5.0 km	MPC · JPL
109376	2001 QE_{163}	—	August 23, 2001	Anderson Mesa	LONEOS	·	2.6 km	MPC · JPL
109377	2001 QF_{163}	—	August 23, 2001	Anderson Mesa	LONEOS	·	3.2 km	MPC · JPL
109378	2001 QN_{163}	—	August 31, 2001	Desert Eagle	W. K. Y. Yeung	·	3.5 km	MPC · JPL
109379	2001 QU_{163}	—	August 31, 2001	Desert Eagle	W. K. Y. Yeung	·	2.4 km	MPC · JPL
109380	2001 QP_{164}	—	August 22, 2001	Palomar	NEAT	·	7.1 km	MPC · JPL
109381	2001 QA_{165}	—	August 22, 2001	Haleakala	NEAT	·	3.5 km	MPC · JPL
109382	2001 QG_{165}	—	August 24, 2001	Haleakala	NEAT	·	7.3 km	MPC · JPL
109383	2001 QR_{165}	—	August 24, 2001	Haleakala	NEAT	·	5.1 km	MPC · JPL
109384	2001 QJ_{166}	—	August 24, 2001	Haleakala	NEAT	·	6.7 km	MPC · JPL
109385	2001 QH_{168}	—	August 25, 2001	Haleakala	NEAT	·	3.3 km	MPC · JPL
109386	2001 QJ_{168}	—	August 25, 2001	Haleakala	NEAT	·	2.4 km	MPC · JPL
109387	2001 QL_{168}	—	August 25, 2001	Palomar	NEAT	·	2.5 km	MPC · JPL
109388	2001 QB_{169}	—	August 26, 2001	Palomar	NEAT	·	2.2 km	MPC · JPL
109389	2001 QE_{169}	—	August 26, 2001	Haleakala	NEAT	·	2.4 km	MPC · JPL
109390	2001 QS_{169}	—	August 22, 2001	Socorro	LINEAR	(5)	2.5 km	MPC · JPL
109391	2001 QY_{171}	—	August 25, 2001	Socorro	LINEAR	slow	4.3 km	MPC · JPL
109392	2001 QV_{172}	—	August 25, 2001	Socorro	LINEAR	·	7.7 km	MPC · JPL
109393	2001 QT_{173}	—	August 25, 2001	Socorro	LINEAR	EOS	3.9 km	MPC · JPL
109394	2001 QX_{173}	—	August 25, 2001	Socorro	LINEAR	(5)	2.2 km	MPC · JPL
109395	2001 QK_{175}	—	August 21, 2001	Kitt Peak	Spacewatch	·	6.4 km	MPC · JPL
109396	2001 QV_{177}	—	August 25, 2001	Palomar	NEAT	·	4.8 km	MPC · JPL
109397	2001 QM_{178}	—	August 26, 2001	Haleakala	NEAT	·	6.5 km	MPC · JPL
109398	2001 QW_{178}	—	August 27, 2001	Palomar	NEAT	·	5.4 km	MPC · JPL
109399	2001 QV_{179}	—	August 25, 2001	Palomar	NEAT	·	7.4 km	MPC · JPL
109400	2001 QY_{179}	—	August 25, 2001	Palomar	NEAT	EOS	5.1 km	MPC · JPL

== 109401–109500 ==
back to top

Designation			Discovery			Properties		Ref
Permanent	Provisional	Named after	Date	Site	Discoverer(s)	Category	Diam.	Ref
109401	2001 QG_{180}	—	August 25, 2001	Palomar	NEAT	·	5.0 km	MPC · JPL
109402	2001 QM_{180}	—	August 25, 2001	Palomar	NEAT	·	2.2 km	MPC · JPL
109403	2001 QV_{180}	—	August 26, 2001	Palomar	NEAT	T_{j} (2.99) · EUP	8.2 km	MPC · JPL
109404	2001 QD_{181}	—	August 27, 2001	Palomar	NEAT	·	2.5 km	MPC · JPL
109405	2001 QH_{181}	—	August 27, 2001	Palomar	NEAT	EUN	2.9 km	MPC · JPL
109406	2001 QC_{182}	—	August 30, 2001	Palomar	NEAT	·	4.0 km	MPC · JPL
109407	2001 QM_{182}	—	August 29, 2001	Palomar	NEAT	·	4.2 km	MPC · JPL
109408	2001 QL_{184}	—	August 21, 2001	Socorro	LINEAR	·	3.1 km	MPC · JPL
109409	2001 QM_{184}	—	August 21, 2001	Socorro	LINEAR	EOS	4.2 km	MPC · JPL
109410	2001 QR_{184}	—	August 21, 2001	Socorro	LINEAR	·	2.6 km	MPC · JPL
109411	2001 QV_{184}	—	August 21, 2001	Socorro	LINEAR	·	6.2 km	MPC · JPL
109412	2001 QC_{186}	—	August 21, 2001	Haleakala	NEAT	·	3.0 km	MPC · JPL
109413	2001 QH_{186}	—	August 21, 2001	Palomar	NEAT	HNS	2.9 km	MPC · JPL
109414	2001 QE_{187}	—	August 21, 2001	Palomar	NEAT	·	2.8 km	MPC · JPL
109415	2001 QV_{187}	—	August 21, 2001	Haleakala	NEAT	·	3.8 km	MPC · JPL
109416	2001 QB_{189}	—	August 22, 2001	Kitt Peak	Spacewatch	·	2.5 km	MPC · JPL
109417	2001 QT_{191}	—	August 22, 2001	Socorro	LINEAR	·	6.6 km	MPC · JPL
109418	2001 QL_{192}	—	August 22, 2001	Socorro	LINEAR	·	5.7 km	MPC · JPL
109419	2001 QM_{192}	—	August 22, 2001	Socorro	LINEAR	EUN	2.7 km	MPC · JPL
109420	2001 QT_{192}	—	August 22, 2001	Socorro	LINEAR	·	2.7 km	MPC · JPL
109421	2001 QY_{192}	—	August 22, 2001	Socorro	LINEAR	·	3.8 km	MPC · JPL
109422	2001 QZ_{192}	—	August 22, 2001	Socorro	LINEAR	·	7.9 km	MPC · JPL
109423	2001 QJ_{193}	—	August 22, 2001	Socorro	LINEAR	·	4.0 km	MPC · JPL
109424	2001 QO_{194}	—	August 22, 2001	Socorro	LINEAR	·	3.9 km	MPC · JPL
109425	2001 QU_{194}	—	August 22, 2001	Socorro	LINEAR	EUN	3.9 km	MPC · JPL
109426	2001 QX_{194}	—	August 22, 2001	Socorro	LINEAR	·	2.7 km	MPC · JPL
109427	2001 QN_{195}	—	August 22, 2001	Palomar	NEAT	·	7.9 km	MPC · JPL
109428	2001 QO_{195}	—	August 22, 2001	Socorro	LINEAR	EUP	10 km	MPC · JPL
109429	2001 QQ_{195}	—	August 22, 2001	Socorro	LINEAR	·	3.1 km	MPC · JPL
109430	2001 QT_{195}	—	August 22, 2001	Socorro	LINEAR	EUN	2.6 km	MPC · JPL
109431	2001 QV_{195}	—	August 22, 2001	Palomar	NEAT	·	2.9 km	MPC · JPL
109432	2001 QA_{196}	—	August 22, 2001	Socorro	LINEAR	EUN	2.6 km	MPC · JPL
109433	2001 QC_{196}	—	August 22, 2001	Haleakala	NEAT	·	7.1 km	MPC · JPL
109434	2001 QV_{196}	—	August 22, 2001	Kitt Peak	Spacewatch	·	3.3 km	MPC · JPL
109435 Giraud	2001 QB_{197}	Giraud	August 22, 2001	Goodricke-Pigott	R. A. Tucker	·	10 km	MPC · JPL
109436	2001 QO_{198}	—	August 22, 2001	Socorro	LINEAR	·	3.1 km	MPC · JPL
109437	2001 QT_{198}	—	August 22, 2001	Socorro	LINEAR	·	3.1 km	MPC · JPL
109438	2001 QR_{199}	—	August 22, 2001	Socorro	LINEAR	·	7.9 km	MPC · JPL
109439	2001 QX_{199}	—	August 22, 2001	Socorro	LINEAR	·	4.4 km	MPC · JPL
109440	2001 QZ_{199}	—	August 22, 2001	Socorro	LINEAR	(5)	3.3 km	MPC · JPL
109441	2001 QA_{200}	—	August 22, 2001	Palomar	NEAT	·	4.5 km	MPC · JPL
109442	2001 QT_{200}	—	August 22, 2001	Socorro	LINEAR	·	3.2 km	MPC · JPL
109443	2001 QC_{201}	—	August 22, 2001	Socorro	LINEAR	EUN	2.2 km	MPC · JPL
109444	2001 QG_{201}	—	August 22, 2001	Kitt Peak	Spacewatch	HYG	5.4 km	MPC · JPL
109445	2001 QX_{201}	—	August 22, 2001	Palomar	NEAT	EUN	2.7 km	MPC · JPL
109446	2001 QS_{204}	—	August 23, 2001	Anderson Mesa	LONEOS	·	5.9 km	MPC · JPL
109447	2001 QO_{205}	—	August 23, 2001	Socorro	LINEAR	V	1.7 km	MPC · JPL
109448	2001 QC_{206}	—	August 23, 2001	Anderson Mesa	LONEOS	·	3.0 km	MPC · JPL
109449	2001 QD_{206}	—	August 23, 2001	Anderson Mesa	LONEOS	·	1.4 km	MPC · JPL
109450	2001 QP_{206}	—	August 23, 2001	Anderson Mesa	LONEOS	·	3.5 km	MPC · JPL
109451	2001 QF_{207}	—	August 23, 2001	Anderson Mesa	LONEOS	THM	5.6 km	MPC · JPL
109452	2001 QB_{208}	—	August 23, 2001	Anderson Mesa	LONEOS	·	6.4 km	MPC · JPL
109453	2001 QA_{209}	—	August 23, 2001	Anderson Mesa	LONEOS	·	5.6 km	MPC · JPL
109454	2001 QQ_{209}	—	August 23, 2001	Anderson Mesa	LONEOS	HNS	2.3 km	MPC · JPL
109455	2001 QG_{210}	—	August 23, 2001	Kitt Peak	Spacewatch	·	2.0 km	MPC · JPL
109456	2001 QU_{210}	—	August 23, 2001	Anderson Mesa	LONEOS	·	3.8 km	MPC · JPL
109457	2001 QZ_{210}	—	August 23, 2001	Anderson Mesa	LONEOS	·	3.3 km	MPC · JPL
109458	2001 QG_{211}	—	August 23, 2001	Anderson Mesa	LONEOS	·	2.7 km	MPC · JPL
109459	2001 QS_{211}	—	August 23, 2001	Anderson Mesa	LONEOS	THM	5.7 km	MPC · JPL
109460	2001 QZ_{211}	—	August 23, 2001	Anderson Mesa	LONEOS	·	2.7 km	MPC · JPL
109461	2001 QR_{212}	—	August 23, 2001	Anderson Mesa	LONEOS	EOS	4.2 km	MPC · JPL
109462	2001 QS_{212}	—	August 23, 2001	Anderson Mesa	LONEOS	·	2.2 km	MPC · JPL
109463	2001 QH_{213}	—	August 23, 2001	Anderson Mesa	LONEOS	(5)	2.2 km	MPC · JPL
109464	2001 QX_{213}	—	August 23, 2001	Anderson Mesa	LONEOS	·	2.1 km	MPC · JPL
109465	2001 QQ_{215}	—	August 23, 2001	Anderson Mesa	LONEOS	·	2.5 km	MPC · JPL
109466	2001 QW_{215}	—	August 23, 2001	Anderson Mesa	LONEOS	·	5.2 km	MPC · JPL
109467	2001 QG_{216}	—	August 23, 2001	Anderson Mesa	LONEOS	·	2.2 km	MPC · JPL
109468	2001 QG_{217}	—	August 23, 2001	Anderson Mesa	LONEOS	·	2.9 km	MPC · JPL
109469	2001 QK_{217}	—	August 23, 2001	Anderson Mesa	LONEOS	·	3.2 km	MPC · JPL
109470	2001 QM_{217}	—	August 23, 2001	Anderson Mesa	LONEOS	·	1.7 km	MPC · JPL
109471	2001 QH_{218}	—	August 23, 2001	Anderson Mesa	LONEOS	NYS	2.1 km	MPC · JPL
109472	2001 QP_{218}	—	August 23, 2001	Anderson Mesa	LONEOS	·	2.5 km	MPC · JPL
109473	2001 QV_{218}	—	August 23, 2001	Anderson Mesa	LONEOS	EUN	2.3 km	MPC · JPL
109474	2001 QH_{219}	—	August 23, 2001	Desert Eagle	W. K. Y. Yeung	(5)	2.9 km	MPC · JPL
109475	2001 QL_{219}	—	August 23, 2001	Socorro	LINEAR	·	4.8 km	MPC · JPL
109476	2001 QS_{220}	—	August 24, 2001	Anderson Mesa	LONEOS	·	2.8 km	MPC · JPL
109477	2001 QY_{220}	—	August 24, 2001	Anderson Mesa	LONEOS	EOS	3.4 km	MPC · JPL
109478	2001 QJ_{221}	—	August 24, 2001	Anderson Mesa	LONEOS	·	3.4 km	MPC · JPL
109479	2001 QR_{221}	—	August 24, 2001	Anderson Mesa	LONEOS	EUN	2.3 km	MPC · JPL
109480	2001 QF_{222}	—	August 24, 2001	Anderson Mesa	LONEOS	·	4.9 km	MPC · JPL
109481	2001 QR_{222}	—	August 24, 2001	Anderson Mesa	LONEOS	·	6.1 km	MPC · JPL
109482	2001 QT_{222}	—	August 24, 2001	Anderson Mesa	LONEOS	·	5.0 km	MPC · JPL
109483	2001 QU_{222}	—	August 24, 2001	Anderson Mesa	LONEOS	·	3.7 km	MPC · JPL
109484	2001 QN_{223}	—	August 24, 2001	Anderson Mesa	LONEOS	NYS	2.3 km	MPC · JPL
109485	2001 QP_{223}	—	August 24, 2001	Anderson Mesa	LONEOS	·	7.5 km	MPC · JPL
109486	2001 QA_{224}	—	August 24, 2001	Anderson Mesa	LONEOS	·	2.7 km	MPC · JPL
109487	2001 QE_{224}	—	August 24, 2001	Anderson Mesa	LONEOS	·	5.5 km	MPC · JPL
109488	2001 QF_{225}	—	August 24, 2001	Socorro	LINEAR	NYS	2.5 km	MPC · JPL
109489	2001 QW_{225}	—	August 24, 2001	Anderson Mesa	LONEOS	EOS	7.7 km	MPC · JPL
109490	2001 QQ_{226}	—	August 24, 2001	Anderson Mesa	LONEOS	·	4.1 km	MPC · JPL
109491	2001 QF_{227}	—	August 24, 2001	Anderson Mesa	LONEOS	·	5.1 km	MPC · JPL
109492	2001 QG_{228}	—	August 24, 2001	Anderson Mesa	LONEOS	·	2.3 km	MPC · JPL
109493	2001 QM_{228}	—	August 24, 2001	Anderson Mesa	LONEOS	·	6.4 km	MPC · JPL
109494	2001 QW_{228}	—	August 24, 2001	Anderson Mesa	LONEOS	·	4.0 km	MPC · JPL
109495	2001 QX_{228}	—	August 24, 2001	Anderson Mesa	LONEOS	·	4.3 km	MPC · JPL
109496	2001 QA_{229}	—	August 24, 2001	Anderson Mesa	LONEOS	·	4.5 km	MPC · JPL
109497	2001 QL_{230}	—	August 24, 2001	Anderson Mesa	LONEOS	VER	6.2 km	MPC · JPL
109498	2001 QR_{231}	—	August 24, 2001	Anderson Mesa	LONEOS	AEG	7.7 km	MPC · JPL
109499	2001 QV_{231}	—	August 24, 2001	Anderson Mesa	LONEOS	KRM	4.3 km	MPC · JPL
109500	2001 QC_{232}	—	August 24, 2001	Anderson Mesa	LONEOS	·	5.2 km	MPC · JPL

== 109501–109600 ==
back to top

Designation			Discovery			Properties		Ref
Permanent	Provisional	Named after	Date	Site	Discoverer(s)	Category	Diam.	Ref
109501	2001 QE_{232}	—	August 24, 2001	Desert Eagle	W. K. Y. Yeung	NYS	2.3 km	MPC · JPL
109502	2001 QF_{232}	—	August 24, 2001	Desert Eagle	W. K. Y. Yeung	·	4.6 km	MPC · JPL
109503	2001 QL_{233}	—	August 24, 2001	Socorro	LINEAR	·	3.4 km	MPC · JPL
109504	2001 QV_{233}	—	August 24, 2001	Socorro	LINEAR	PHO	1.8 km	MPC · JPL
109505	2001 QA_{234}	—	August 24, 2001	Socorro	LINEAR	·	2.6 km	MPC · JPL
109506	2001 QO_{234}	—	August 24, 2001	Socorro	LINEAR	EOS	4.0 km	MPC · JPL
109507	2001 QT_{234}	—	August 24, 2001	Socorro	LINEAR	THM	5.0 km	MPC · JPL
109508	2001 QV_{234}	—	August 24, 2001	Socorro	LINEAR	·	4.8 km	MPC · JPL
109509	2001 QY_{234}	—	August 24, 2001	Socorro	LINEAR	·	2.3 km	MPC · JPL
109510	2001 QM_{235}	—	August 24, 2001	Socorro	LINEAR	MAS	1.4 km	MPC · JPL
109511	2001 QY_{235}	—	August 24, 2001	Socorro	LINEAR	·	4.0 km	MPC · JPL
109512	2001 QA_{236}	—	August 24, 2001	Socorro	LINEAR	ERI	5.0 km	MPC · JPL
109513	2001 QQ_{236}	—	August 24, 2001	Socorro	LINEAR	·	4.2 km	MPC · JPL
109514	2001 QB_{237}	—	August 24, 2001	Socorro	LINEAR	·	1.9 km	MPC · JPL
109515	2001 QC_{238}	—	August 24, 2001	Socorro	LINEAR	·	2.6 km	MPC · JPL
109516	2001 QM_{238}	—	August 24, 2001	Socorro	LINEAR	THM	5.7 km	MPC · JPL
109517	2001 QR_{238}	—	August 24, 2001	Socorro	LINEAR	·	5.2 km	MPC · JPL
109518	2001 QC_{239}	—	August 24, 2001	Socorro	LINEAR	(5)	2.0 km	MPC · JPL
109519	2001 QT_{239}	—	August 24, 2001	Socorro	LINEAR	·	8.0 km	MPC · JPL
109520	2001 QX_{241}	—	August 24, 2001	Socorro	LINEAR	·	2.5 km	MPC · JPL
109521	2001 QV_{242}	—	August 24, 2001	Socorro	LINEAR	·	2.8 km	MPC · JPL
109522	2001 QU_{243}	—	August 24, 2001	Kitt Peak	Spacewatch	EOS	5.5 km	MPC · JPL
109523	2001 QM_{244}	—	August 24, 2001	Socorro	LINEAR	·	2.8 km	MPC · JPL
109524	2001 QT_{244}	—	August 24, 2001	Socorro	LINEAR	·	3.8 km	MPC · JPL
109525	2001 QQ_{245}	—	August 24, 2001	Socorro	LINEAR	·	2.8 km	MPC · JPL
109526	2001 QS_{245}	—	August 24, 2001	Socorro	LINEAR	·	4.1 km	MPC · JPL
109527	2001 QU_{246}	—	August 24, 2001	Socorro	LINEAR	·	5.7 km	MPC · JPL
109528	2001 QW_{247}	—	August 24, 2001	Socorro	LINEAR	·	3.0 km	MPC · JPL
109529	2001 QE_{248}	—	August 24, 2001	Socorro	LINEAR	·	1.9 km	MPC · JPL
109530	2001 QK_{248}	—	August 24, 2001	Socorro	LINEAR	·	3.6 km	MPC · JPL
109531	2001 QP_{248}	—	August 24, 2001	Socorro	LINEAR	·	2.0 km	MPC · JPL
109532	2001 QM_{249}	—	August 24, 2001	Socorro	LINEAR	·	3.3 km	MPC · JPL
109533	2001 QX_{249}	—	August 24, 2001	Haleakala	NEAT	·	2.7 km	MPC · JPL
109534	2001 QF_{250}	—	August 24, 2001	Haleakala	NEAT	·	2.8 km	MPC · JPL
109535	2001 QP_{250}	—	August 24, 2001	Haleakala	NEAT	·	2.9 km	MPC · JPL
109536	2001 QT_{250}	—	August 24, 2001	Haleakala	NEAT	·	2.3 km	MPC · JPL
109537	2001 QU_{250}	—	August 24, 2001	Haleakala	NEAT	·	1.9 km	MPC · JPL
109538	2001 QV_{250}	—	August 24, 2001	Haleakala	NEAT	·	3.3 km	MPC · JPL
109539	2001 QR_{251}	—	August 25, 2001	Socorro	LINEAR	EOS	3.3 km	MPC · JPL
109540	2001 QN_{252}	—	August 25, 2001	Socorro	LINEAR	·	4.7 km	MPC · JPL
109541	2001 QY_{252}	—	August 25, 2001	Socorro	LINEAR	EOS	4.1 km	MPC · JPL
109542	2001 QS_{254}	—	August 25, 2001	Socorro	LINEAR	·	1.8 km	MPC · JPL
109543	2001 QB_{255}	—	August 25, 2001	Anderson Mesa	LONEOS	·	6.4 km	MPC · JPL
109544	2001 QH_{255}	—	August 25, 2001	Socorro	LINEAR	·	4.1 km	MPC · JPL
109545	2001 QF_{256}	—	August 25, 2001	Socorro	LINEAR	·	1.7 km	MPC · JPL
109546	2001 QP_{256}	—	August 25, 2001	Socorro	LINEAR	·	2.6 km	MPC · JPL
109547	2001 QZ_{256}	—	August 25, 2001	Socorro	LINEAR	·	4.8 km	MPC · JPL
109548	2001 QE_{257}	—	August 25, 2001	Socorro	LINEAR	·	2.8 km	MPC · JPL
109549	2001 QM_{257}	—	August 25, 2001	Socorro	LINEAR	L5	20 km	MPC · JPL
109550	2001 QA_{258}	—	August 25, 2001	Socorro	LINEAR	EUN	3.0 km	MPC · JPL
109551	2001 QL_{259}	—	August 25, 2001	Socorro	LINEAR	·	2.5 km	MPC · JPL
109552	2001 QW_{259}	—	August 25, 2001	Socorro	LINEAR	·	6.8 km	MPC · JPL
109553	2001 QF_{260}	—	August 25, 2001	Socorro	LINEAR	EOS	3.6 km	MPC · JPL
109554	2001 QO_{260}	—	August 25, 2001	Socorro	LINEAR	EOS	4.3 km	MPC · JPL
109555	2001 QS_{260}	—	August 25, 2001	Socorro	LINEAR	HOF	6.3 km	MPC · JPL
109556	2001 QZ_{260}	—	August 25, 2001	Socorro	LINEAR	·	2.6 km	MPC · JPL
109557	2001 QS_{261}	—	August 25, 2001	Socorro	LINEAR	·	4.6 km	MPC · JPL
109558	2001 QT_{261}	—	August 25, 2001	Socorro	LINEAR	·	6.1 km	MPC · JPL
109559	2001 QH_{262}	—	August 25, 2001	Socorro	LINEAR	·	2.1 km	MPC · JPL
109560	2001 QN_{262}	—	August 25, 2001	Socorro	LINEAR	EOS	3.9 km	MPC · JPL
109561	2001 QO_{263}	—	August 25, 2001	Socorro	LINEAR	EUN	2.8 km	MPC · JPL
109562	2001 QY_{263}	—	August 25, 2001	Anderson Mesa	LONEOS	·	4.2 km	MPC · JPL
109563	2001 QF_{264}	—	August 25, 2001	Anderson Mesa	LONEOS	·	4.2 km	MPC · JPL
109564	2001 QP_{264}	—	August 26, 2001	Črni Vrh	Skvarč, J.	·	3.0 km	MPC · JPL
109565	2001 QQ_{264}	—	August 26, 2001	Anderson Mesa	LONEOS	HNS	2.1 km	MPC · JPL
109566	2001 QM_{265}	—	August 26, 2001	Anderson Mesa	LONEOS	·	2.8 km	MPC · JPL
109567	2001 QB_{267}	—	August 20, 2001	Socorro	LINEAR	·	2.8 km	MPC · JPL
109568	2001 QE_{267}	—	August 20, 2001	Socorro	LINEAR	·	3.6 km	MPC · JPL
109569	2001 QR_{267}	—	August 20, 2001	Palomar	NEAT	·	8.7 km	MPC · JPL
109570	2001 QJ_{268}	—	August 20, 2001	Socorro	LINEAR	·	4.7 km	MPC · JPL
109571	2001 QV_{268}	—	August 20, 2001	Palomar	NEAT	·	3.6 km	MPC · JPL
109572	2001 QJ_{269}	—	August 20, 2001	Haleakala	NEAT	·	6.5 km	MPC · JPL
109573 Mishasmirnov	2001 QQ_{269}	Mishasmirnov	August 20, 2001	Crimea-Simeis	Crimean Astrophysical Observatory	·	2.8 km	MPC · JPL
109574	2001 QV_{269}	—	August 19, 2001	Socorro	LINEAR	·	3.4 km	MPC · JPL
109575	2001 QQ_{270}	—	August 19, 2001	Socorro	LINEAR	·	4.3 km	MPC · JPL
109576	2001 QB_{271}	—	August 19, 2001	Socorro	LINEAR	GEF	2.4 km	MPC · JPL
109577	2001 QD_{271}	—	August 19, 2001	Socorro	LINEAR	·	2.9 km	MPC · JPL
109578	2001 QV_{271}	—	August 19, 2001	Socorro	LINEAR	·	5.9 km	MPC · JPL
109579	2001 QL_{273}	—	August 19, 2001	Socorro	LINEAR	·	3.7 km	MPC · JPL
109580	2001 QN_{273}	—	August 19, 2001	Socorro	LINEAR	·	4.1 km	MPC · JPL
109581	2001 QO_{274}	—	August 19, 2001	Socorro	LINEAR	CYB	8.5 km	MPC · JPL
109582	2001 QL_{275}	—	August 19, 2001	Anderson Mesa	LONEOS	·	12 km	MPC · JPL
109583	2001 QP_{275}	—	August 19, 2001	Haleakala	NEAT	EOS	5.4 km	MPC · JPL
109584	2001 QZ_{275}	—	August 19, 2001	Socorro	LINEAR	·	4.0 km	MPC · JPL
109585	2001 QO_{276}	—	August 19, 2001	Socorro	LINEAR	·	2.0 km	MPC · JPL
109586	2001 QG_{277}	—	August 19, 2001	Socorro	LINEAR	·	3.6 km	MPC · JPL
109587	2001 QJ_{277}	—	August 19, 2001	Socorro	LINEAR	slow	7.6 km	MPC · JPL
109588	2001 QN_{277}	—	August 19, 2001	Socorro	LINEAR	·	2.3 km	MPC · JPL
109589	2001 QD_{278}	—	August 19, 2001	Socorro	LINEAR	·	1.9 km	MPC · JPL
109590	2001 QF_{279}	—	August 19, 2001	Socorro	LINEAR	·	5.3 km	MPC · JPL
109591	2001 QV_{279}	—	August 19, 2001	Socorro	LINEAR	·	3.9 km	MPC · JPL
109592	2001 QJ_{280}	—	August 19, 2001	Socorro	LINEAR	·	5.9 km	MPC · JPL
109593	2001 QS_{280}	—	August 19, 2001	Socorro	LINEAR	·	1.7 km	MPC · JPL
109594	2001 QD_{281}	—	August 19, 2001	Socorro	LINEAR	·	4.0 km	MPC · JPL
109595	2001 QJ_{281}	—	August 19, 2001	Socorro	LINEAR	THB	8.2 km	MPC · JPL
109596	2001 QK_{281}	—	August 19, 2001	Socorro	LINEAR	·	3.5 km	MPC · JPL
109597	2001 QU_{281}	—	August 19, 2001	Socorro	LINEAR	·	2.6 km	MPC · JPL
109598	2001 QD_{282}	—	August 19, 2001	Anderson Mesa	LONEOS	H	1.3 km	MPC · JPL
109599	2001 QF_{282}	—	August 19, 2001	Anderson Mesa	LONEOS	·	7.9 km	MPC · JPL
109600	2001 QJ_{282}	—	August 19, 2001	Socorro	LINEAR	·	2.4 km	MPC · JPL

== 109601–109700 ==
back to top

Designation			Discovery			Properties		Ref
Permanent	Provisional	Named after	Date	Site	Discoverer(s)	Category	Diam.	Ref
109601	2001 QM_{282}	—	August 19, 2001	Anderson Mesa	LONEOS	·	3.1 km	MPC · JPL
109602	2001 QN_{282}	—	August 19, 2001	Anderson Mesa	LONEOS	·	4.3 km	MPC · JPL
109603	2001 QD_{283}	—	August 18, 2001	Palomar	NEAT	PHO	3.4 km	MPC · JPL
109604	2001 QZ_{283}	—	August 18, 2001	Anderson Mesa	LONEOS	EUN	6.4 km	MPC · JPL
109605	2001 QL_{284}	—	August 18, 2001	Anderson Mesa	LONEOS	·	3.2 km	MPC · JPL
109606	2001 QB_{285}	—	August 23, 2001	Haleakala	NEAT	MAS	1.4 km	MPC · JPL
109607	2001 QK_{285}	—	August 23, 2001	Haleakala	NEAT	·	2.4 km	MPC · JPL
109608	2001 QL_{287}	—	August 17, 2001	Socorro	LINEAR	·	2.0 km	MPC · JPL
109609	2001 QZ_{287}	—	August 17, 2001	Socorro	LINEAR	·	2.9 km	MPC · JPL
109610	2001 QA_{289}	—	August 16, 2001	Socorro	LINEAR	HYG	7.5 km	MPC · JPL
109611	2001 QD_{289}	—	August 16, 2001	Socorro	LINEAR	MAS	1.3 km	MPC · JPL
109612	2001 QF_{289}	—	August 16, 2001	Socorro	LINEAR	HIL · 3:2	8.8 km	MPC · JPL
109613	2001 QL_{289}	—	August 16, 2001	Socorro	LINEAR	·	2.0 km	MPC · JPL
109614	2001 QR_{290}	—	August 16, 2001	Socorro	LINEAR	·	1.8 km	MPC · JPL
109615	2001 QT_{290}	—	August 16, 2001	Socorro	LINEAR	·	2.3 km	MPC · JPL
109616	2001 QN_{291}	—	August 16, 2001	Socorro	LINEAR	·	3.1 km	MPC · JPL
109617	2001 QC_{292}	—	August 16, 2001	Palomar	NEAT	·	4.9 km	MPC · JPL
109618	2001 QN_{293}	—	August 25, 2001	Bergisch Gladbach	W. Bickel	·	2.7 km	MPC · JPL
109619	2001 QX_{293}	—	August 24, 2001	Anderson Mesa	LONEOS	·	6.4 km	MPC · JPL
109620	2001 QF_{294}	—	August 24, 2001	Anderson Mesa	LONEOS	MAS	1.3 km	MPC · JPL
109621	2001 QO_{294}	—	August 24, 2001	Anderson Mesa	LONEOS	·	2.3 km	MPC · JPL
109622	2001 QQ_{294}	—	August 24, 2001	Anderson Mesa	LONEOS	ADE	4.9 km	MPC · JPL
109623	2001 QT_{295}	—	August 24, 2001	Socorro	LINEAR	·	4.4 km	MPC · JPL
109624	2001 QY_{295}	—	August 24, 2001	Socorro	LINEAR	EUN	3.4 km	MPC · JPL
109625	2001 QK_{296}	—	August 24, 2001	Socorro	LINEAR	·	3.7 km	MPC · JPL
109626	2001 QL_{296}	—	August 24, 2001	Socorro	LINEAR	ADE	3.6 km	MPC · JPL
109627	2001 QE_{297}	—	August 24, 2001	Anderson Mesa	LONEOS	·	3.7 km	MPC · JPL
109628	2001 QP_{323}	—	August 27, 2001	Anderson Mesa	LONEOS	·	5.4 km	MPC · JPL
109629	2001 QR_{323}	—	August 27, 2001	Anderson Mesa	LONEOS	EOS	6.3 km	MPC · JPL
109630	2001 QT_{323}	—	August 27, 2001	Anderson Mesa	LONEOS	EUN	2.5 km	MPC · JPL
109631	2001 QT_{326}	—	August 23, 2001	Palomar	NEAT	slow	5.0 km	MPC · JPL
109632	2001 QF_{328}	—	August 25, 2001	Palomar	NEAT	·	1.9 km	MPC · JPL
109633	2001 QP_{328}	—	August 29, 2001	Palomar	NEAT	VER	7.1 km	MPC · JPL
109634	2001 QQ_{328}	—	August 29, 2001	Palomar	NEAT	·	5.5 km	MPC · JPL
109635	2001 QE_{329}	—	August 17, 2001	Socorro	LINEAR	·	3.4 km	MPC · JPL
109636	2001 QD_{330}	—	August 25, 2001	Anderson Mesa	LONEOS	GEF	2.5 km	MPC · JPL
109637	2001 QU_{330}	—	August 27, 2001	Anderson Mesa	LONEOS	·	4.8 km	MPC · JPL
109638	2001 QV_{330}	—	August 27, 2001	Anderson Mesa	LONEOS	EOS	3.1 km	MPC · JPL
109639	2001 RA	—	September 2, 2001	Farpoint	G. Hug	HNS	2.7 km	MPC · JPL
109640	2001 RJ	—	September 6, 2001	Socorro	LINEAR	PAL	7.2 km	MPC · JPL
109641	2001 RQ	—	September 7, 2001	Socorro	LINEAR	EUP	12 km	MPC · JPL
109642	2001 RA_{1}	—	September 7, 2001	Socorro	LINEAR	MAS	1.2 km	MPC · JPL
109643	2001 RW_{1}	—	September 7, 2001	Socorro	LINEAR	·	7.0 km	MPC · JPL
109644	2001 RO_{2}	—	September 9, 2001	Prescott	P. G. Comba	(5)	1.9 km	MPC · JPL
109645	2001 RD_{3}	—	September 8, 2001	Anderson Mesa	LONEOS	·	2.7 km	MPC · JPL
109646	2001 RW_{3}	—	September 7, 2001	Socorro	LINEAR	·	4.5 km	MPC · JPL
109647	2001 RD_{4}	—	September 8, 2001	Socorro	LINEAR	·	2.6 km	MPC · JPL
109648	2001 RU_{4}	—	September 8, 2001	Socorro	LINEAR	·	3.0 km	MPC · JPL
109649	2001 RC_{5}	—	September 8, 2001	Socorro	LINEAR	·	2.5 km	MPC · JPL
109650	2001 RZ_{6}	—	September 10, 2001	Desert Eagle	W. K. Y. Yeung	NEM	4.9 km	MPC · JPL
109651	2001 RE_{7}	—	September 10, 2001	Desert Eagle	W. K. Y. Yeung	EUN	2.0 km	MPC · JPL
109652	2001 RJ_{7}	—	September 10, 2001	Desert Eagle	W. K. Y. Yeung	·	2.3 km	MPC · JPL
109653	2001 RS_{7}	—	September 8, 2001	Socorro	LINEAR	·	3.4 km	MPC · JPL
109654	2001 RV_{8}	—	September 9, 2001	Socorro	LINEAR	·	2.7 km	MPC · JPL
109655	2001 RW_{8}	—	September 9, 2001	Socorro	LINEAR	·	5.1 km	MPC · JPL
109656	2001 RY_{8}	—	September 7, 2001	Socorro	LINEAR	KOR	2.8 km	MPC · JPL
109657	2001 RQ_{10}	—	September 11, 2001	Fountain Hills	C. W. Juels	·	4.7 km	MPC · JPL
109658	2001 RZ_{10}	—	September 11, 2001	San Marcello	A. Boattini, L. Tesi	·	5.5 km	MPC · JPL
109659	2001 RF_{11}	—	September 10, 2001	Desert Eagle	W. K. Y. Yeung	CYB	10 km	MPC · JPL
109660	2001 RF_{15}	—	September 10, 2001	Socorro	LINEAR	·	4.7 km	MPC · JPL
109661	2001 RQ_{16}	—	September 12, 2001	Prescott	P. G. Comba	·	1.9 km	MPC · JPL
109662	2001 RM_{18}	—	September 7, 2001	Socorro	LINEAR	·	3.2 km	MPC · JPL
109663	2001 RO_{18}	—	September 7, 2001	Socorro	LINEAR	·	6.5 km	MPC · JPL
109664	2001 RX_{18}	—	September 7, 2001	Socorro	LINEAR	·	2.7 km	MPC · JPL
109665	2001 RM_{19}	—	September 7, 2001	Socorro	LINEAR	·	2.0 km	MPC · JPL
109666	2001 RR_{19}	—	September 7, 2001	Socorro	LINEAR	·	4.5 km	MPC · JPL
109667	2001 RW_{19}	—	September 7, 2001	Socorro	LINEAR	·	2.7 km	MPC · JPL
109668	2001 RA_{22}	—	September 7, 2001	Socorro	LINEAR	·	4.3 km	MPC · JPL
109669	2001 RH_{22}	—	September 7, 2001	Socorro	LINEAR	·	2.0 km	MPC · JPL
109670	2001 RR_{22}	—	September 7, 2001	Socorro	LINEAR	·	2.7 km	MPC · JPL
109671	2001 RC_{23}	—	September 7, 2001	Socorro	LINEAR	NYS	1.8 km	MPC · JPL
109672	2001 RE_{23}	—	September 7, 2001	Socorro	LINEAR	(5)	2.2 km	MPC · JPL
109673	2001 RF_{23}	—	September 7, 2001	Socorro	LINEAR	(5)	2.4 km	MPC · JPL
109674	2001 RG_{23}	—	September 7, 2001	Socorro	LINEAR	·	1.4 km	MPC · JPL
109675	2001 RP_{24}	—	September 7, 2001	Socorro	LINEAR	·	2.9 km	MPC · JPL
109676	2001 RC_{25}	—	September 7, 2001	Socorro	LINEAR	·	2.4 km	MPC · JPL
109677	2001 RP_{25}	—	September 7, 2001	Socorro	LINEAR	·	2.0 km	MPC · JPL
109678	2001 RW_{25}	—	September 7, 2001	Socorro	LINEAR	·	2.6 km	MPC · JPL
109679	2001 RA_{26}	—	September 7, 2001	Socorro	LINEAR	·	2.1 km	MPC · JPL
109680	2001 RJ_{26}	—	September 7, 2001	Socorro	LINEAR	THM	5.2 km	MPC · JPL
109681	2001 RO_{26}	—	September 7, 2001	Socorro	LINEAR	·	4.9 km	MPC · JPL
109682	2001 RS_{29}	—	September 7, 2001	Socorro	LINEAR	EOS	3.6 km	MPC · JPL
109683	2001 RA_{30}	—	September 7, 2001	Socorro	LINEAR	·	3.2 km	MPC · JPL
109684	2001 RJ_{30}	—	September 7, 2001	Socorro	LINEAR	(5)	1.8 km	MPC · JPL
109685	2001 RZ_{30}	—	September 7, 2001	Socorro	LINEAR	·	3.4 km	MPC · JPL
109686	2001 RF_{31}	—	September 7, 2001	Socorro	LINEAR	·	4.0 km	MPC · JPL
109687	2001 RP_{32}	—	September 8, 2001	Socorro	LINEAR	·	4.6 km	MPC · JPL
109688	2001 RP_{33}	—	September 8, 2001	Socorro	LINEAR	EOS	5.2 km	MPC · JPL
109689	2001 RY_{33}	—	September 8, 2001	Socorro	LINEAR	·	2.6 km	MPC · JPL
109690	2001 RM_{34}	—	September 8, 2001	Socorro	LINEAR	·	2.5 km	MPC · JPL
109691	2001 RR_{35}	—	September 8, 2001	Socorro	LINEAR	·	4.4 km	MPC · JPL
109692	2001 RV_{35}	—	September 8, 2001	Socorro	LINEAR	·	2.8 km	MPC · JPL
109693	2001 RS_{36}	—	September 8, 2001	Socorro	LINEAR	·	4.0 km	MPC · JPL
109694	2001 RC_{37}	—	September 8, 2001	Socorro	LINEAR	·	2.0 km	MPC · JPL
109695	2001 RC_{38}	—	September 8, 2001	Socorro	LINEAR	THM	6.0 km	MPC · JPL
109696	2001 RL_{38}	—	September 8, 2001	Socorro	LINEAR	·	2.9 km	MPC · JPL
109697	2001 RM_{38}	—	September 8, 2001	Socorro	LINEAR	·	3.1 km	MPC · JPL
109698	2001 RS_{38}	—	September 9, 2001	Socorro	LINEAR	·	2.6 km	MPC · JPL
109699	2001 RL_{39}	—	September 10, 2001	Socorro	LINEAR	URS	8.2 km	MPC · JPL
109700	2001 RU_{40}	—	September 11, 2001	Socorro	LINEAR	·	7.1 km	MPC · JPL

== 109701–109800 ==
back to top

Designation			Discovery			Properties		Ref
Permanent	Provisional	Named after	Date	Site	Discoverer(s)	Category	Diam.	Ref
109701	2001 RY_{40}	—	September 11, 2001	Socorro	LINEAR	·	6.5 km	MPC · JPL
109702	2001 RK_{41}	—	September 11, 2001	Socorro	LINEAR	·	3.1 km	MPC · JPL
109703	2001 RX_{41}	—	September 11, 2001	Socorro	LINEAR	·	4.8 km	MPC · JPL
109704	2001 RJ_{42}	—	September 11, 2001	Socorro	LINEAR	·	4.4 km	MPC · JPL
109705	2001 RE_{43}	—	September 9, 2001	Palomar	NEAT	·	2.2 km	MPC · JPL
109706	2001 RU_{43}	—	September 10, 2001	Desert Eagle	W. K. Y. Yeung	(5)	2.3 km	MPC · JPL
109707	2001 RK_{44}	—	September 12, 2001	Palomar	NEAT	·	3.8 km	MPC · JPL
109708	2001 RL_{44}	—	September 12, 2001	Palomar	NEAT	EUN	2.4 km	MPC · JPL
109709	2001 RG_{45}	—	September 12, 2001	Palomar	NEAT	(5)	3.1 km	MPC · JPL
109710	2001 RN_{45}	—	September 14, 2001	Palomar	NEAT	·	2.3 km	MPC · JPL
109711	2001 RQ_{45}	—	September 14, 2001	Palomar	NEAT	·	4.1 km	MPC · JPL
109712 Giger	2001 RH_{46}	Giger	September 12, 2001	Goodricke-Pigott	R. A. Tucker	JUN	1.7 km	MPC · JPL
109713	2001 RZ_{47}	—	September 15, 2001	Bisei SG Center	BATTeRS	EUN	3.5 km	MPC · JPL
109714	2001 RL_{48}	—	September 11, 2001	Desert Eagle	W. K. Y. Yeung	slow	6.2 km	MPC · JPL
109715	2001 RO_{48}	—	September 10, 2001	Socorro	LINEAR	·	4.4 km	MPC · JPL
109716	2001 RM_{49}	—	September 10, 2001	Socorro	LINEAR	EOS	3.0 km	MPC · JPL
109717	2001 RT_{50}	—	September 11, 2001	Socorro	LINEAR	KON	4.5 km	MPC · JPL
109718	2001 RB_{53}	—	September 12, 2001	Socorro	LINEAR	·	6.5 km	MPC · JPL
109719	2001 RG_{53}	—	September 12, 2001	Socorro	LINEAR	·	4.7 km	MPC · JPL
109720	2001 RR_{53}	—	September 12, 2001	Socorro	LINEAR	NAE	4.8 km	MPC · JPL
109721	2001 RE_{54}	—	September 12, 2001	Socorro	LINEAR	·	2.8 km	MPC · JPL
109722	2001 RL_{55}	—	September 12, 2001	Socorro	LINEAR	·	4.0 km	MPC · JPL
109723	2001 RR_{55}	—	September 12, 2001	Socorro	LINEAR	·	4.8 km	MPC · JPL
109724	2001 RS_{55}	—	September 12, 2001	Socorro	LINEAR	·	1.8 km	MPC · JPL
109725	2001 RG_{56}	—	September 12, 2001	Socorro	LINEAR	(5)	2.7 km	MPC · JPL
109726	2001 RY_{56}	—	September 12, 2001	Socorro	LINEAR	·	2.0 km	MPC · JPL
109727	2001 RD_{58}	—	September 12, 2001	Socorro	LINEAR	·	5.8 km	MPC · JPL
109728	2001 RF_{58}	—	September 12, 2001	Socorro	LINEAR	·	1.4 km	MPC · JPL
109729	2001 RP_{58}	—	September 12, 2001	Socorro	LINEAR	·	2.3 km	MPC · JPL
109730	2001 RC_{59}	—	September 12, 2001	Socorro	LINEAR	·	1.6 km	MPC · JPL
109731	2001 RD_{59}	—	September 12, 2001	Socorro	LINEAR	·	2.8 km	MPC · JPL
109732	2001 RU_{59}	—	September 12, 2001	Socorro	LINEAR	HYG	7.7 km	MPC · JPL
109733	2001 RZ_{60}	—	September 12, 2001	Socorro	LINEAR	HYG	7.1 km	MPC · JPL
109734	2001 RM_{61}	—	September 12, 2001	Socorro	LINEAR	·	2.2 km	MPC · JPL
109735	2001 RZ_{61}	—	September 12, 2001	Socorro	LINEAR	·	7.7 km	MPC · JPL
109736	2001 RV_{62}	—	September 12, 2001	Socorro	LINEAR	·	2.7 km	MPC · JPL
109737	2001 RX_{62}	—	September 12, 2001	Socorro	LINEAR	BRA	4.3 km	MPC · JPL
109738	2001 RS_{63}	—	September 11, 2001	Anderson Mesa	LONEOS	·	6.3 km	MPC · JPL
109739	2001 RU_{63}	—	September 11, 2001	Anderson Mesa	LONEOS	·	7.6 km	MPC · JPL
109740	2001 RY_{63}	—	September 10, 2001	Socorro	LINEAR	·	2.2 km	MPC · JPL
109741	2001 RA_{64}	—	September 10, 2001	Socorro	LINEAR	·	7.4 km	MPC · JPL
109742	2001 RM_{64}	—	September 10, 2001	Socorro	LINEAR	·	3.0 km	MPC · JPL
109743	2001 RV_{65}	—	September 10, 2001	Socorro	LINEAR	·	3.3 km	MPC · JPL
109744	2001 RV_{66}	—	September 10, 2001	Socorro	LINEAR	·	4.0 km	MPC · JPL
109745	2001 RJ_{67}	—	September 10, 2001	Socorro	LINEAR	V	2.0 km	MPC · JPL
109746	2001 RT_{67}	—	September 10, 2001	Socorro	LINEAR	·	3.6 km	MPC · JPL
109747	2001 RH_{68}	—	September 10, 2001	Socorro	LINEAR	·	4.9 km	MPC · JPL
109748	2001 RJ_{68}	—	September 10, 2001	Socorro	LINEAR	·	3.7 km	MPC · JPL
109749	2001 RO_{68}	—	September 10, 2001	Socorro	LINEAR	EOS	4.7 km	MPC · JPL
109750	2001 RP_{68}	—	September 10, 2001	Socorro	LINEAR	·	3.2 km	MPC · JPL
109751	2001 RR_{68}	—	September 10, 2001	Socorro	LINEAR	·	3.4 km	MPC · JPL
109752	2001 RV_{68}	—	September 10, 2001	Socorro	LINEAR	ADE	5.8 km	MPC · JPL
109753	2001 RV_{69}	—	September 10, 2001	Socorro	LINEAR	·	6.8 km	MPC · JPL
109754	2001 RM_{70}	—	September 10, 2001	Socorro	LINEAR	·	5.8 km	MPC · JPL
109755	2001 RL_{71}	—	September 10, 2001	Socorro	LINEAR	·	2.2 km	MPC · JPL
109756	2001 RQ_{71}	—	September 10, 2001	Socorro	LINEAR	·	3.2 km	MPC · JPL
109757	2001 RV_{71}	—	September 10, 2001	Socorro	LINEAR	·	3.6 km	MPC · JPL
109758	2001 RW_{71}	—	September 10, 2001	Socorro	LINEAR	·	3.1 km	MPC · JPL
109759	2001 RJ_{72}	—	September 10, 2001	Socorro	LINEAR	HYG	7.8 km	MPC · JPL
109760	2001 RO_{74}	—	September 10, 2001	Socorro	LINEAR	AGN	2.3 km	MPC · JPL
109761	2001 RG_{75}	—	September 10, 2001	Socorro	LINEAR	·	3.3 km	MPC · JPL
109762	2001 RG_{76}	—	September 10, 2001	Socorro	LINEAR	·	2.8 km	MPC · JPL
109763	2001 RV_{76}	—	September 10, 2001	Socorro	LINEAR	·	4.8 km	MPC · JPL
109764	2001 RE_{77}	—	September 10, 2001	Socorro	LINEAR	·	3.5 km	MPC · JPL
109765	2001 RT_{77}	—	September 10, 2001	Socorro	LINEAR	·	4.9 km	MPC · JPL
109766	2001 RU_{77}	—	September 10, 2001	Socorro	LINEAR	·	4.3 km	MPC · JPL
109767	2001 RH_{78}	—	September 10, 2001	Socorro	LINEAR	·	9.0 km	MPC · JPL
109768	2001 RJ_{78}	—	September 10, 2001	Socorro	LINEAR	URS	8.0 km	MPC · JPL
109769	2001 RU_{78}	—	September 10, 2001	Socorro	LINEAR	·	1.6 km	MPC · JPL
109770	2001 RC_{79}	—	September 10, 2001	Socorro	LINEAR	·	4.2 km	MPC · JPL
109771	2001 RE_{79}	—	September 10, 2001	Socorro	LINEAR	·	3.1 km	MPC · JPL
109772	2001 RJ_{79}	—	September 10, 2001	Socorro	LINEAR	·	2.7 km	MPC · JPL
109773	2001 RV_{79}	—	September 12, 2001	Socorro	LINEAR	·	1.7 km	MPC · JPL
109774	2001 RG_{80}	—	September 12, 2001	Palomar	NEAT	·	7.7 km	MPC · JPL
109775	2001 RO_{80}	—	September 14, 2001	Palomar	NEAT	(5)	2.5 km	MPC · JPL
109776	2001 RB_{81}	—	September 13, 2001	Palomar	NEAT	·	3.3 km	MPC · JPL
109777	2001 RY_{81}	—	September 14, 2001	Ondřejov	P. Kušnirák	EUN	2.3 km	MPC · JPL
109778	2001 RM_{83}	—	September 11, 2001	Anderson Mesa	LONEOS	·	2.0 km	MPC · JPL
109779	2001 RB_{84}	—	September 11, 2001	Anderson Mesa	LONEOS	·	6.8 km	MPC · JPL
109780	2001 RF_{84}	—	September 11, 2001	Anderson Mesa	LONEOS	·	2.1 km	MPC · JPL
109781	2001 RK_{84}	—	September 11, 2001	Anderson Mesa	LONEOS	·	5.6 km	MPC · JPL
109782	2001 RN_{86}	—	September 11, 2001	Anderson Mesa	LONEOS	·	4.2 km	MPC · JPL
109783	2001 RZ_{86}	—	September 11, 2001	Anderson Mesa	LONEOS	·	2.9 km	MPC · JPL
109784	2001 RV_{87}	—	September 11, 2001	Anderson Mesa	LONEOS	·	2.6 km	MPC · JPL
109785	2001 RY_{87}	—	September 11, 2001	Anderson Mesa	LONEOS	·	3.1 km	MPC · JPL
109786	2001 RB_{89}	—	September 11, 2001	Anderson Mesa	LONEOS	NYS	3.3 km	MPC · JPL
109787	2001 RO_{89}	—	September 11, 2001	Anderson Mesa	LONEOS	·	2.0 km	MPC · JPL
109788	2001 RT_{89}	—	September 11, 2001	Anderson Mesa	LONEOS	·	2.1 km	MPC · JPL
109789	2001 RX_{89}	—	September 11, 2001	Anderson Mesa	LONEOS	·	2.9 km	MPC · JPL
109790	2001 RY_{90}	—	September 11, 2001	Anderson Mesa	LONEOS	·	5.6 km	MPC · JPL
109791	2001 RL_{91}	—	September 11, 2001	Anderson Mesa	LONEOS	THM	5.6 km	MPC · JPL
109792	2001 RN_{91}	—	September 11, 2001	Anderson Mesa	LONEOS	·	2.5 km	MPC · JPL
109793	2001 RK_{92}	—	September 11, 2001	Anderson Mesa	LONEOS	·	2.4 km	MPC · JPL
109794	2001 RL_{92}	—	September 11, 2001	Anderson Mesa	LONEOS	·	3.0 km	MPC · JPL
109795	2001 RM_{92}	—	September 11, 2001	Anderson Mesa	LONEOS	·	5.7 km	MPC · JPL
109796	2001 RX_{92}	—	September 11, 2001	Anderson Mesa	LONEOS	·	3.0 km	MPC · JPL
109797	2001 RY_{92}	—	September 11, 2001	Anderson Mesa	LONEOS	·	5.0 km	MPC · JPL
109798	2001 RZ_{92}	—	September 11, 2001	Anderson Mesa	LONEOS	·	3.9 km	MPC · JPL
109799	2001 RP_{93}	—	September 11, 2001	Anderson Mesa	LONEOS	·	5.2 km	MPC · JPL
109800	2001 RC_{94}	—	September 11, 2001	Anderson Mesa	LONEOS	THM	6.1 km	MPC · JPL

== 109801–109900 ==
back to top

Designation			Discovery			Properties		Ref
Permanent	Provisional	Named after	Date	Site	Discoverer(s)	Category	Diam.	Ref
109801	2001 RE_{94}	—	September 11, 2001	Anderson Mesa	LONEOS	·	5.0 km	MPC · JPL
109802	2001 RU_{94}	—	September 11, 2001	Anderson Mesa	LONEOS	(5)	5.2 km	MPC · JPL
109803	2001 RE_{95}	—	September 11, 2001	Anderson Mesa	LONEOS	·	2.6 km	MPC · JPL
109804	2001 RU_{95}	—	September 11, 2001	Kitt Peak	Spacewatch	KOR	2.3 km	MPC · JPL
109805	2001 RW_{100}	—	September 12, 2001	Socorro	LINEAR	KOR	2.7 km	MPC · JPL
109806	2001 RW_{101}	—	September 12, 2001	Socorro	LINEAR	·	5.0 km	MPC · JPL
109807	2001 RG_{102}	—	September 12, 2001	Socorro	LINEAR	TEL	2.5 km	MPC · JPL
109808	2001 RL_{102}	—	September 12, 2001	Socorro	LINEAR	·	4.0 km	MPC · JPL
109809	2001 RT_{102}	—	September 12, 2001	Socorro	LINEAR	·	2.7 km	MPC · JPL
109810	2001 RZ_{102}	—	September 12, 2001	Socorro	LINEAR	NYS	1.4 km	MPC · JPL
109811	2001 RN_{103}	—	September 12, 2001	Socorro	LINEAR	·	4.3 km	MPC · JPL
109812	2001 RO_{103}	—	September 12, 2001	Socorro	LINEAR	·	5.5 km	MPC · JPL
109813	2001 RP_{104}	—	September 12, 2001	Socorro	LINEAR	·	2.8 km	MPC · JPL
109814	2001 RU_{105}	—	September 12, 2001	Socorro	LINEAR	(5)	2.3 km	MPC · JPL
109815	2001 RY_{105}	—	September 12, 2001	Socorro	LINEAR	NYS	1.8 km	MPC · JPL
109816	2001 RN_{106}	—	September 12, 2001	Socorro	LINEAR	·	2.3 km	MPC · JPL
109817	2001 RS_{106}	—	September 12, 2001	Socorro	LINEAR	NYS	2.0 km	MPC · JPL
109818	2001 RM_{107}	—	September 12, 2001	Socorro	LINEAR	·	2.3 km	MPC · JPL
109819	2001 RO_{107}	—	September 12, 2001	Socorro	LINEAR	·	1.7 km	MPC · JPL
109820	2001 RL_{109}	—	September 12, 2001	Socorro	LINEAR	·	1.8 km	MPC · JPL
109821	2001 RN_{109}	—	September 12, 2001	Socorro	LINEAR	·	1.8 km	MPC · JPL
109822	2001 RC_{111}	—	September 12, 2001	Socorro	LINEAR	·	3.0 km	MPC · JPL
109823	2001 RG_{111}	—	September 12, 2001	Socorro	LINEAR	MAS	1.6 km	MPC · JPL
109824	2001 RC_{114}	—	September 12, 2001	Socorro	LINEAR	·	2.6 km	MPC · JPL
109825	2001 RG_{114}	—	September 12, 2001	Socorro	LINEAR	·	2.6 km	MPC · JPL
109826	2001 RQ_{114}	—	September 12, 2001	Socorro	LINEAR	·	1.8 km	MPC · JPL
109827	2001 RW_{114}	—	September 12, 2001	Socorro	LINEAR	·	1.9 km	MPC · JPL
109828	2001 RR_{116}	—	September 12, 2001	Socorro	LINEAR	EUN	1.6 km	MPC · JPL
109829	2001 RK_{118}	—	September 12, 2001	Socorro	LINEAR	·	6.0 km	MPC · JPL
109830	2001 RZ_{118}	—	September 12, 2001	Socorro	LINEAR	·	2.4 km	MPC · JPL
109831	2001 RX_{119}	—	September 12, 2001	Socorro	LINEAR	·	1.7 km	MPC · JPL
109832	2001 RY_{119}	—	September 12, 2001	Socorro	LINEAR	·	2.1 km	MPC · JPL
109833	2001 RM_{121}	—	September 12, 2001	Socorro	LINEAR	KOR	2.6 km	MPC · JPL
109834	2001 RC_{122}	—	September 12, 2001	Socorro	LINEAR	·	2.5 km	MPC · JPL
109835	2001 RJ_{123}	—	September 12, 2001	Socorro	LINEAR	·	3.9 km	MPC · JPL
109836	2001 RQ_{123}	—	September 12, 2001	Socorro	LINEAR	·	1.5 km	MPC · JPL
109837	2001 RD_{124}	—	September 12, 2001	Socorro	LINEAR	·	3.0 km	MPC · JPL
109838	2001 RN_{124}	—	September 12, 2001	Socorro	LINEAR	(12739)	3.8 km	MPC · JPL
109839	2001 RQ_{124}	—	September 12, 2001	Socorro	LINEAR	·	3.1 km	MPC · JPL
109840	2001 RV_{124}	—	September 12, 2001	Socorro	LINEAR	·	2.5 km	MPC · JPL
109841	2001 RH_{125}	—	September 12, 2001	Socorro	LINEAR	·	2.0 km	MPC · JPL
109842	2001 RS_{125}	—	September 12, 2001	Socorro	LINEAR	TEL	2.5 km	MPC · JPL
109843	2001 RP_{126}	—	September 12, 2001	Socorro	LINEAR	EUN	1.6 km	MPC · JPL
109844	2001 RN_{127}	—	September 12, 2001	Socorro	LINEAR	·	2.4 km	MPC · JPL
109845	2001 RZ_{127}	—	September 12, 2001	Socorro	LINEAR	·	4.3 km	MPC · JPL
109846	2001 RY_{128}	—	September 12, 2001	Socorro	LINEAR	·	5.4 km	MPC · JPL
109847	2001 RQ_{129}	—	September 12, 2001	Socorro	LINEAR	·	1.7 km	MPC · JPL
109848	2001 RS_{129}	—	September 12, 2001	Socorro	LINEAR	EOS	3.5 km	MPC · JPL
109849	2001 RZ_{130}	—	September 12, 2001	Socorro	LINEAR	·	4.6 km	MPC · JPL
109850	2001 RO_{131}	—	September 12, 2001	Socorro	LINEAR	·	2.4 km	MPC · JPL
109851	2001 RG_{132}	—	September 12, 2001	Socorro	LINEAR	·	2.2 km	MPC · JPL
109852	2001 RR_{132}	—	September 12, 2001	Socorro	LINEAR	·	3.8 km	MPC · JPL
109853	2001 RJ_{133}	—	September 12, 2001	Socorro	LINEAR	·	4.8 km	MPC · JPL
109854	2001 RZ_{133}	—	September 12, 2001	Socorro	LINEAR	·	2.5 km	MPC · JPL
109855	2001 RU_{134}	—	September 12, 2001	Socorro	LINEAR	ADE	5.6 km	MPC · JPL
109856	2001 RZ_{134}	—	September 12, 2001	Socorro	LINEAR	MAR	2.3 km	MPC · JPL
109857	2001 RK_{136}	—	September 12, 2001	Socorro	LINEAR	·	3.4 km	MPC · JPL
109858	2001 RS_{136}	—	September 12, 2001	Socorro	LINEAR	·	2.9 km	MPC · JPL
109859	2001 RB_{137}	—	September 12, 2001	Socorro	LINEAR	·	5.0 km	MPC · JPL
109860	2001 RW_{139}	—	September 12, 2001	Socorro	LINEAR	CYB	6.5 km	MPC · JPL
109861	2001 RC_{140}	—	September 12, 2001	Socorro	LINEAR	·	3.3 km	MPC · JPL
109862	2001 RR_{142}	—	September 11, 2001	Palomar	NEAT	EUN	2.7 km	MPC · JPL
109863	2001 RU_{142}	—	September 11, 2001	Palomar	NEAT	·	6.0 km	MPC · JPL
109864	2001 RD_{143}	—	September 15, 2001	Palomar	NEAT	MAR	2.9 km	MPC · JPL
109865	2001 RY_{144}	—	September 6, 2001	Palomar	NEAT	HNS	3.3 km	MPC · JPL
109866	2001 RS_{146}	—	September 9, 2001	Socorro	LINEAR	·	3.3 km	MPC · JPL
109867	2001 RA_{147}	—	September 9, 2001	Anderson Mesa	LONEOS	JUN	2.0 km	MPC · JPL
109868	2001 RS_{147}	—	September 10, 2001	Anderson Mesa	LONEOS	·	2.7 km	MPC · JPL
109869	2001 RH_{149}	—	September 10, 2001	Palomar	NEAT	·	4.4 km	MPC · JPL
109870	2001 RS_{149}	—	September 11, 2001	Anderson Mesa	LONEOS	·	5.5 km	MPC · JPL
109871	2001 RD_{151}	—	September 11, 2001	Anderson Mesa	LONEOS	·	5.4 km	MPC · JPL
109872	2001 RL_{151}	—	September 11, 2001	Anderson Mesa	LONEOS	·	2.3 km	MPC · JPL
109873	2001 RA_{152}	—	September 11, 2001	Anderson Mesa	LONEOS	·	4.4 km	MPC · JPL
109874	2001 RX_{153}	—	September 14, 2001	Palomar	NEAT	·	5.8 km	MPC · JPL
109875	2001 RZ_{153}	—	September 14, 2001	Palomar	NEAT	GEF	2.7 km	MPC · JPL
109876	2001 RT_{154}	—	September 11, 2001	Anderson Mesa	LONEOS	·	7.7 km	MPC · JPL
109877	2001 RZ_{154}	—	September 12, 2001	Socorro	LINEAR	·	1.7 km	MPC · JPL
109878	2001 SG	—	September 16, 2001	Fountain Hills	C. W. Juels, P. R. Holvorcem	(5)	3.0 km	MPC · JPL
109879 Letelier	2001 SL	Letelier	September 16, 2001	Fountain Hills	C. W. Juels, P. R. Holvorcem	·	1.8 km	MPC · JPL
109880	2001 SZ	—	September 17, 2001	Desert Eagle	W. K. Y. Yeung	·	2.7 km	MPC · JPL
109881	2001 SE_{1}	—	September 17, 2001	Desert Eagle	W. K. Y. Yeung	·	5.0 km	MPC · JPL
109882	2001 SM_{2}	—	September 17, 2001	Desert Eagle	W. K. Y. Yeung	·	4.0 km	MPC · JPL
109883	2001 SC_{4}	—	September 18, 2001	Fountain Hills	C. W. Juels, P. R. Holvorcem	·	3.1 km	MPC · JPL
109884	2001 SO_{7}	—	September 18, 2001	Kitt Peak	Spacewatch	·	2.5 km	MPC · JPL
109885	2001 SP_{8}	—	September 18, 2001	Kitt Peak	Spacewatch	·	4.5 km	MPC · JPL
109886	2001 SX_{8}	—	September 19, 2001	Fountain Hills	C. W. Juels, P. R. Holvorcem	·	3.0 km	MPC · JPL
109887	2001 SW_{9}	—	September 18, 2001	Desert Eagle	W. K. Y. Yeung	GEF	2.5 km	MPC · JPL
109888	2001 SY_{9}	—	September 18, 2001	Desert Eagle	W. K. Y. Yeung	·	3.5 km	MPC · JPL
109889	2001 SB_{10}	—	September 20, 2001	Desert Eagle	W. K. Y. Yeung	(5)	2.0 km	MPC · JPL
109890	2001 SF_{10}	—	September 20, 2001	Desert Eagle	W. K. Y. Yeung	·	5.2 km	MPC · JPL
109891	2001 SU_{10}	—	September 16, 2001	Socorro	LINEAR	·	5.6 km	MPC · JPL
109892	2001 SZ_{10}	—	September 16, 2001	Socorro	LINEAR	·	7.0 km	MPC · JPL
109893	2001 ST_{12}	—	September 16, 2001	Socorro	LINEAR	·	2.3 km	MPC · JPL
109894	2001 SC_{16}	—	September 16, 2001	Socorro	LINEAR	·	2.5 km	MPC · JPL
109895	2001 SC_{18}	—	September 16, 2001	Socorro	LINEAR	MIS	3.8 km	MPC · JPL
109896	2001 SD_{18}	—	September 16, 2001	Socorro	LINEAR	·	3.3 km	MPC · JPL
109897	2001 SZ_{18}	—	September 16, 2001	Socorro	LINEAR	·	2.2 km	MPC · JPL
109898	2001 SE_{20}	—	September 16, 2001	Socorro	LINEAR	·	6.6 km	MPC · JPL
109899	2001 SG_{20}	—	September 16, 2001	Socorro	LINEAR	·	4.7 km	MPC · JPL
109900	2001 SS_{20}	—	September 16, 2001	Socorro	LINEAR	·	2.7 km	MPC · JPL

== 109901–110000 ==
back to top

Designation			Discovery			Properties		Ref
Permanent	Provisional	Named after	Date	Site	Discoverer(s)	Category	Diam.	Ref
109901	2001 SU_{20}	—	September 16, 2001	Socorro	LINEAR	·	3.1 km	MPC · JPL
109902	2001 SH_{21}	—	September 16, 2001	Socorro	LINEAR	·	2.5 km	MPC · JPL
109903	2001 SL_{21}	—	September 16, 2001	Socorro	LINEAR	PAD	4.8 km	MPC · JPL
109904	2001 ST_{21}	—	September 16, 2001	Socorro	LINEAR	·	2.7 km	MPC · JPL
109905	2001 SB_{22}	—	September 16, 2001	Socorro	LINEAR	·	3.2 km	MPC · JPL
109906	2001 SC_{22}	—	September 16, 2001	Socorro	LINEAR	·	2.4 km	MPC · JPL
109907	2001 SZ_{23}	—	September 16, 2001	Socorro	LINEAR	·	2.6 km	MPC · JPL
109908	2001 SP_{24}	—	September 16, 2001	Socorro	LINEAR	·	2.2 km	MPC · JPL
109909	2001 SR_{24}	—	September 16, 2001	Socorro	LINEAR	GEF	4.0 km	MPC · JPL
109910	2001 SY_{24}	—	September 16, 2001	Socorro	LINEAR	·	3.6 km	MPC · JPL
109911	2001 SK_{25}	—	September 16, 2001	Socorro	LINEAR	THM	5.7 km	MPC · JPL
109912	2001 SU_{25}	—	September 16, 2001	Socorro	LINEAR	THM ·	4.6 km	MPC · JPL
109913	2001 SV_{25}	—	September 16, 2001	Socorro	LINEAR	·	2.7 km	MPC · JPL
109914	2001 SF_{26}	—	September 16, 2001	Socorro	LINEAR	·	2.5 km	MPC · JPL
109915	2001 SU_{26}	—	September 16, 2001	Socorro	LINEAR	·	2.7 km	MPC · JPL
109916	2001 SE_{27}	—	September 16, 2001	Socorro	LINEAR	·	2.3 km	MPC · JPL
109917	2001 SF_{27}	—	September 16, 2001	Socorro	LINEAR	·	7.3 km	MPC · JPL
109918	2001 SY_{27}	—	September 16, 2001	Socorro	LINEAR	·	6.4 km	MPC · JPL
109919	2001 SB_{29}	—	September 16, 2001	Socorro	LINEAR	·	5.2 km	MPC · JPL
109920	2001 SJ_{29}	—	September 16, 2001	Socorro	LINEAR	·	3.6 km	MPC · JPL
109921	2001 SY_{29}	—	September 16, 2001	Socorro	LINEAR	·	2.9 km	MPC · JPL
109922	2001 SU_{30}	—	September 16, 2001	Socorro	LINEAR	·	1.9 km	MPC · JPL
109923	2001 SF_{31}	—	September 16, 2001	Socorro	LINEAR	EOS	3.6 km	MPC · JPL
109924	2001 SO_{31}	—	September 16, 2001	Socorro	LINEAR	EUN	2.7 km	MPC · JPL
109925	2001 SP_{31}	—	September 16, 2001	Socorro	LINEAR	·	2.9 km	MPC · JPL
109926	2001 SU_{31}	—	September 16, 2001	Socorro	LINEAR	·	3.2 km	MPC · JPL
109927	2001 SA_{32}	—	September 16, 2001	Socorro	LINEAR	·	1.9 km	MPC · JPL
109928	2001 SD_{32}	—	September 16, 2001	Socorro	LINEAR	·	3.4 km	MPC · JPL
109929	2001 SH_{33}	—	September 16, 2001	Socorro	LINEAR	·	5.1 km	MPC · JPL
109930	2001 SZ_{34}	—	September 16, 2001	Socorro	LINEAR	EOS	3.7 km	MPC · JPL
109931	2001 SZ_{35}	—	September 16, 2001	Socorro	LINEAR	·	2.4 km	MPC · JPL
109932	2001 SA_{37}	—	September 16, 2001	Socorro	LINEAR	·	6.1 km	MPC · JPL
109933	2001 SW_{37}	—	September 16, 2001	Socorro	LINEAR	EUN	1.8 km	MPC · JPL
109934	2001 SL_{38}	—	September 16, 2001	Socorro	LINEAR	THM	5.1 km	MPC · JPL
109935	2001 SC_{39}	—	September 16, 2001	Socorro	LINEAR	·	7.7 km	MPC · JPL
109936	2001 SD_{39}	—	September 16, 2001	Socorro	LINEAR	·	3.2 km	MPC · JPL
109937	2001 SX_{39}	—	September 16, 2001	Socorro	LINEAR	·	2.2 km	MPC · JPL
109938	2001 SL_{40}	—	September 16, 2001	Socorro	LINEAR	MRX	2.7 km	MPC · JPL
109939	2001 SU_{40}	—	September 16, 2001	Socorro	LINEAR	·	2.4 km	MPC · JPL
109940	2001 SR_{41}	—	September 16, 2001	Socorro	LINEAR	·	5.4 km	MPC · JPL
109941	2001 SJ_{42}	—	September 16, 2001	Socorro	LINEAR	·	4.7 km	MPC · JPL
109942	2001 SW_{42}	—	September 16, 2001	Socorro	LINEAR	AGN	2.0 km	MPC · JPL
109943	2001 SY_{42}	—	September 16, 2001	Socorro	LINEAR	·	2.3 km	MPC · JPL
109944	2001 SN_{43}	—	September 16, 2001	Socorro	LINEAR	(5)	2.0 km	MPC · JPL
109945	2001 SU_{43}	—	September 16, 2001	Socorro	LINEAR	·	3.7 km	MPC · JPL
109946	2001 SH_{44}	—	September 16, 2001	Socorro	LINEAR	·	4.8 km	MPC · JPL
109947	2001 SM_{44}	—	September 16, 2001	Socorro	LINEAR	·	2.4 km	MPC · JPL
109948	2001 SN_{45}	—	September 16, 2001	Socorro	LINEAR	·	5.1 km	MPC · JPL
109949	2001 SY_{45}	—	September 16, 2001	Socorro	LINEAR	·	4.4 km	MPC · JPL
109950	2001 SB_{46}	—	September 16, 2001	Socorro	LINEAR	·	8.2 km	MPC · JPL
109951	2001 SF_{46}	—	September 16, 2001	Socorro	LINEAR	·	4.1 km	MPC · JPL
109952	2001 SK_{46}	—	September 16, 2001	Socorro	LINEAR	·	6.0 km	MPC · JPL
109953	2001 SA_{47}	—	September 16, 2001	Socorro	LINEAR	·	7.5 km	MPC · JPL
109954	2001 SC_{47}	—	September 16, 2001	Socorro	LINEAR	ADE	3.5 km	MPC · JPL
109955	2001 SK_{47}	—	September 16, 2001	Socorro	LINEAR	·	2.5 km	MPC · JPL
109956	2001 SS_{47}	—	September 16, 2001	Socorro	LINEAR	·	4.8 km	MPC · JPL
109957	2001 SW_{47}	—	September 16, 2001	Socorro	LINEAR	EOS	3.5 km	MPC · JPL
109958	2001 SD_{48}	—	September 16, 2001	Socorro	LINEAR	·	4.9 km	MPC · JPL
109959	2001 SP_{48}	—	September 16, 2001	Socorro	LINEAR	(31811)	5.3 km	MPC · JPL
109960	2001 SX_{48}	—	September 16, 2001	Socorro	LINEAR	HYG	5.8 km	MPC · JPL
109961	2001 SE_{49}	—	September 16, 2001	Socorro	LINEAR	·	6.1 km	MPC · JPL
109962	2001 SN_{49}	—	September 16, 2001	Socorro	LINEAR	3:2	9.5 km	MPC · JPL
109963	2001 SW_{49}	—	September 16, 2001	Socorro	LINEAR	·	4.0 km	MPC · JPL
109964	2001 SX_{49}	—	September 16, 2001	Socorro	LINEAR	HNS	2.1 km	MPC · JPL
109965	2001 SY_{49}	—	September 16, 2001	Socorro	LINEAR	·	5.4 km	MPC · JPL
109966	2001 SF_{50}	—	September 16, 2001	Socorro	LINEAR	·	5.3 km	MPC · JPL
109967	2001 SQ_{50}	—	September 16, 2001	Socorro	LINEAR	V	1.9 km	MPC · JPL
109968	2001 SA_{51}	—	September 16, 2001	Socorro	LINEAR	·	4.4 km	MPC · JPL
109969	2001 SV_{51}	—	September 16, 2001	Socorro	LINEAR	·	6.4 km	MPC · JPL
109970	2001 SW_{51}	—	September 16, 2001	Socorro	LINEAR	·	4.5 km	MPC · JPL
109971	2001 SP_{52}	—	September 16, 2001	Socorro	LINEAR	MRX	1.6 km	MPC · JPL
109972	2001 SR_{52}	—	September 16, 2001	Socorro	LINEAR	MAR	1.9 km	MPC · JPL
109973	2001 SK_{53}	—	September 16, 2001	Socorro	LINEAR	·	2.9 km	MPC · JPL
109974	2001 SL_{53}	—	September 16, 2001	Socorro	LINEAR	·	1.7 km	MPC · JPL
109975	2001 SM_{53}	—	September 16, 2001	Socorro	LINEAR	·	2.1 km	MPC · JPL
109976	2001 SN_{53}	—	September 16, 2001	Socorro	LINEAR	(5)	2.1 km	MPC · JPL
109977	2001 SU_{53}	—	September 16, 2001	Socorro	LINEAR	slow	2.8 km	MPC · JPL
109978	2001 ST_{54}	—	September 16, 2001	Socorro	LINEAR	HYG · slow	6.7 km	MPC · JPL
109979	2001 SB_{55}	—	September 16, 2001	Socorro	LINEAR	·	5.5 km	MPC · JPL
109980	2001 SC_{55}	—	September 16, 2001	Socorro	LINEAR	·	5.2 km	MPC · JPL
109981	2001 SF_{55}	—	September 16, 2001	Socorro	LINEAR	·	2.9 km	MPC · JPL
109982	2001 SQ_{55}	—	September 16, 2001	Socorro	LINEAR	·	3.7 km	MPC · JPL
109983	2001 SY_{55}	—	September 16, 2001	Socorro	LINEAR	EUN	3.2 km	MPC · JPL
109984	2001 SB_{57}	—	September 16, 2001	Socorro	LINEAR	JUN	2.0 km	MPC · JPL
109985	2001 SG_{57}	—	September 16, 2001	Socorro	LINEAR	·	3.8 km	MPC · JPL
109986	2001 SN_{57}	—	September 16, 2001	Socorro	LINEAR	BRG	2.5 km	MPC · JPL
109987	2001 SO_{57}	—	September 17, 2001	Socorro	LINEAR	·	4.7 km	MPC · JPL
109988	2001 SR_{57}	—	September 17, 2001	Socorro	LINEAR	·	2.0 km	MPC · JPL
109989	2001 SX_{57}	—	September 17, 2001	Socorro	LINEAR	HYG	5.1 km	MPC · JPL
109990	2001 SS_{58}	—	September 17, 2001	Socorro	LINEAR	·	7.4 km	MPC · JPL
109991	2001 SF_{59}	—	September 17, 2001	Socorro	LINEAR	·	1.5 km	MPC · JPL
109992	2001 SV_{59}	—	September 17, 2001	Socorro	LINEAR	·	2.9 km	MPC · JPL
109993	2001 SC_{60}	—	September 17, 2001	Socorro	LINEAR	EUN	2.2 km	MPC · JPL
109994	2001 SA_{61}	—	September 17, 2001	Socorro	LINEAR	·	2.0 km	MPC · JPL
109995	2001 SJ_{61}	—	September 17, 2001	Socorro	LINEAR	·	2.4 km	MPC · JPL
109996	2001 SW_{61}	—	September 17, 2001	Socorro	LINEAR	THM	5.0 km	MPC · JPL
109997	2001 SA_{62}	—	September 17, 2001	Socorro	LINEAR	·	2.8 km	MPC · JPL
109998	2001 SN_{62}	—	September 17, 2001	Socorro	LINEAR	·	2.6 km	MPC · JPL
109999	2001 SZ_{62}	—	September 17, 2001	Socorro	LINEAR	·	6.9 km	MPC · JPL
110000	2001 SM_{63}	—	September 17, 2001	Socorro	LINEAR	·	2.4 km	MPC · JPL

back to top

== See also ==
- Meanings of minor-planet names: 109001–110000
