= Religion in Manchukuo =

Religion in Manchukuo, a Japanese puppet state, included State Shinto, Chinese folk religion, Buddhism, shamanism, along with both Russian Orthodoxy and Catholicism. Puyi, the Emperor of Manchukuo, took an interest in traditional Chinese religions, such as Confucianism and Buddhism, but this was disallowed by the Japanese who enforced a policy of State Shinto. Puyi was known to consult oracles and recite prayers.

The Human Rights Protection Law of 1932 (Jinken hoshōhō 人権保障法)) promised to defend the people's right to life, business, and declared equality of race and religion. It also guaranteed the right to petition the government and protection from corrupt officials. However, these rights were poorly defined and able to be taken away by the state during "war and times of crisis".

== Christianity ==
=== Catholicism ===
In the 1930s, Manchukuo was home to approximately 120 missionaries, 800 catechists and 120,000 baptized people. However, the Japanese invasion had it made it nearly impossible to contact the Apostolic Delegation in Beijing. On 28 May 1931 as Apostolic Administration of Harbin was founded, on territory split off from the Apostolic Vicariate of Siberia. By 1938, Japan sent Admiral Yamamoto Shinjiro to the Vatican in order to request a representative of the Catholic Church arrive in Manchukuo, Shinjiro claimed that "there are many important Catholic interests" in the nation. In addition, he spoke with Pope Pius XI regarding matters of militarism in Japan.

The Vatican soon after recognized the independence of Manchukuo by the Congregation De Propaganda Fide (a purely religious body responsible for missions) and not by the Secretariat of State responsible for diplomatic relations with states. The Vatican also appointed André Sagard to manage relations and for his service, Emperor Puyi gave Sagard the medal of Commander of the Order of the Pillars of the State of Manchukuo, a high honor for foreigners.

Although the vast majority of the White Russians in Manchukuo remained Orthodox, a small number converted to Catholicism. The Russian Catholic Apostolic Exarchate of Harbin was established in 1928 to serve both Byzantine Rite Russian Catholics as well as for other Eastern Catholics in Harbin, such as Ukrainians. Its clergy included Russian Orthodox convert priests and priests of the Society of Jesus. It eventually had a cathedral in Harbin, the Cathedral of St Vladimir.

==== Notable Catholic Churches ====
- Sacred Heart of Jesus Cathedral
- Harbin Nangang Christian Church (formerly Catholic, now Protestant)

=== Orthodoxy ===
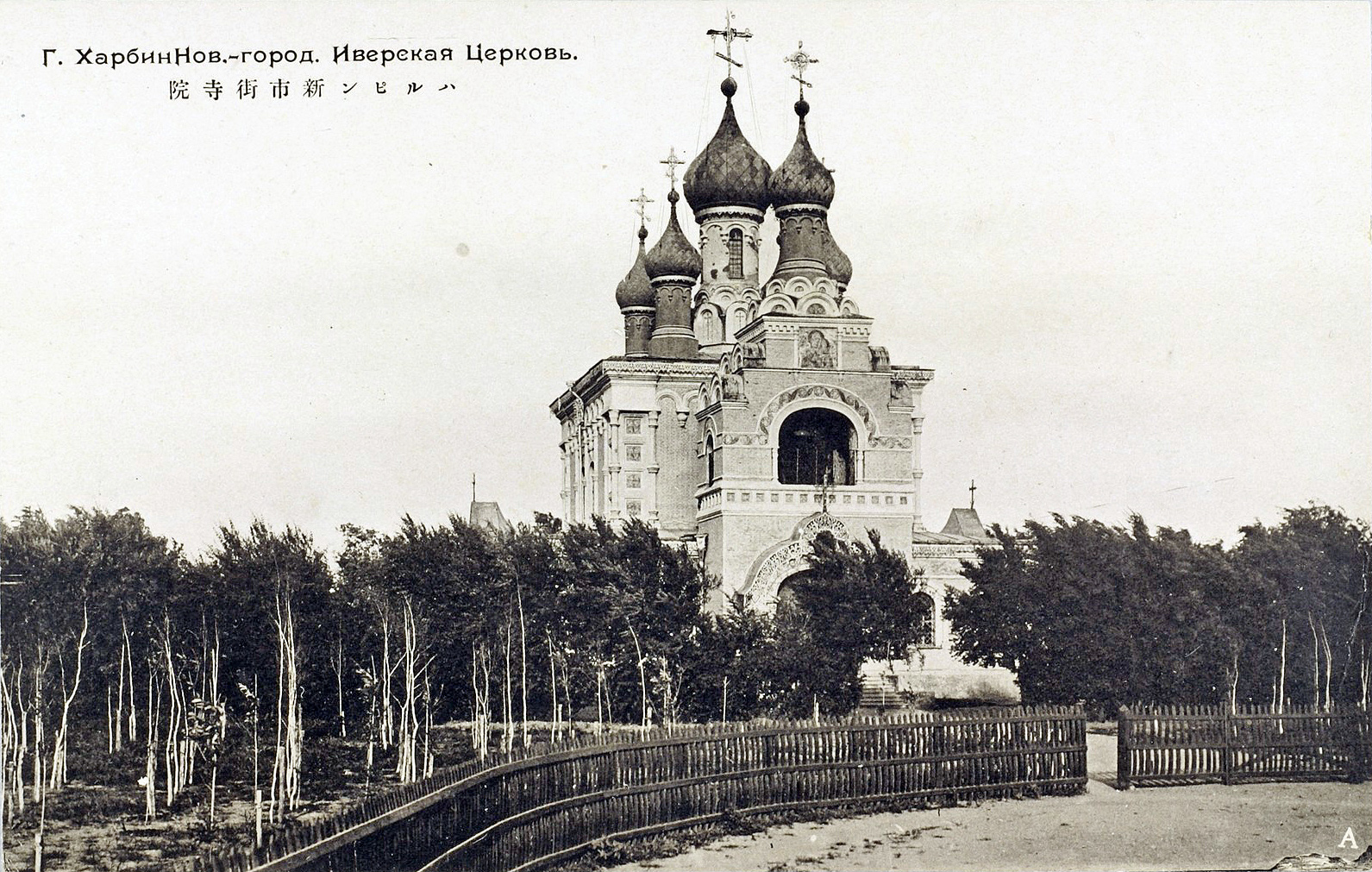
A Russian Orthodox Church in Harbin, pictured in 1930

From approximately 1898, the city of Harbin had a majority-Russian population, initial settlers were mostly the builders and employees of the Chinese Eastern Railway. Many of these Russians brought their Orthodox religion with them. In the time between 1913 and 1923, Russia went through World War I, the Russian Revolution, and the Russian Civil War. In the 1920s Harbin was flooded with 100,000 to 200,000 White émigrés fleeing from Russia.

As of 1939 the Russian Orthodox Church in Manchukuo had 100,000 believers and 200 priests in 60 parishes, and also its own seminary, university, convent, and monastery.

==== Notable Orthodox Churches ====
- Saint Sophia Cathedral
- Church of the Intercession

== State Shinto ==
The Japanese Government built a total of 345 Shinto shrines across Manchukuo.

Starting with the Religions Law of May 1938, a cult of Emperor-worship closely modeled after the Imperial cult in Japan where Hirohito was worshiped as a living god, began in Manchukuo. Just as in Japan, schoolchildren began their classes by praying to a portrait of the emperor while imperial rescripts, and the imperial regalia become sacred relics imbued with magical powers by being associated with the god-emperor. As the Emperor Puyi was considered to be a living god, his will could not be limited by any law, and the purpose of the law was starkly reduced down to serving the will of the emperor rather than upholding values and rules.

As in Japan, the idea governing the legal philosophy in Manchukuo was the Emperor was a living god who was responsible to no-one and who delegated some of his powers down to mere human beings who had the duty of obeying the will of the god-emperors. In Japan and Manchukuo, the actions of the god-emperors were always just and moral because gods could never do wrong, rather than because the god-emperors were acting to uphold moral values that existed a priori. Puyi later stated that Shinto was "a dangerous cult" and a tool for the Japanese to "control the world" while testifying to an International Military Tribunal, he also declared that the Japanese government restrained him and coerced into issuing Pro-Japanese laws.

== Folk Religion and Shamanism ==
Manchukuo also promoted a racially centered, ethnic religion for each of the races inhabiting Manchuria. For example, under the suggestions of Ogasawara Shozo [ja] that the Mongols "need(ed) a new religion, specifically a new god" they promoted the worship of Genghis Khan that continues today in northern China. The Shinto shrine of Kalgan (now Zhangjiakou, Hebei) incorporated Genghis Khan worship and was opened to local Mongols.

== Judaism ==
The Jewish community in Manchukuo was not subjected to the official persecution that Jews experienced under Japan's ally Nazi Germany, and Japanese authorities were involved in closing down local anti-Semitic publications such as the Russian Fascist Party's newspaper Nash Put. However, Jews in Manchukuo were victims of harassment by antisemitic elements among the White Russian population, one notable incident being the murder of Simon Kaspé. In 1937 the Far Eastern Jewish Council was created, chaired by the Harbin Jewish community leader Dr. Abraham Kaufman. Nearly 70% of Jews in Harbin fled China as a result of Kaspé's murder.
