= Orthodox Diocese of Harbin and Manchuria =

Diocese of Harbin and Manchuria 哈尔滨教区 Харбинская и Маньчжурская епархия
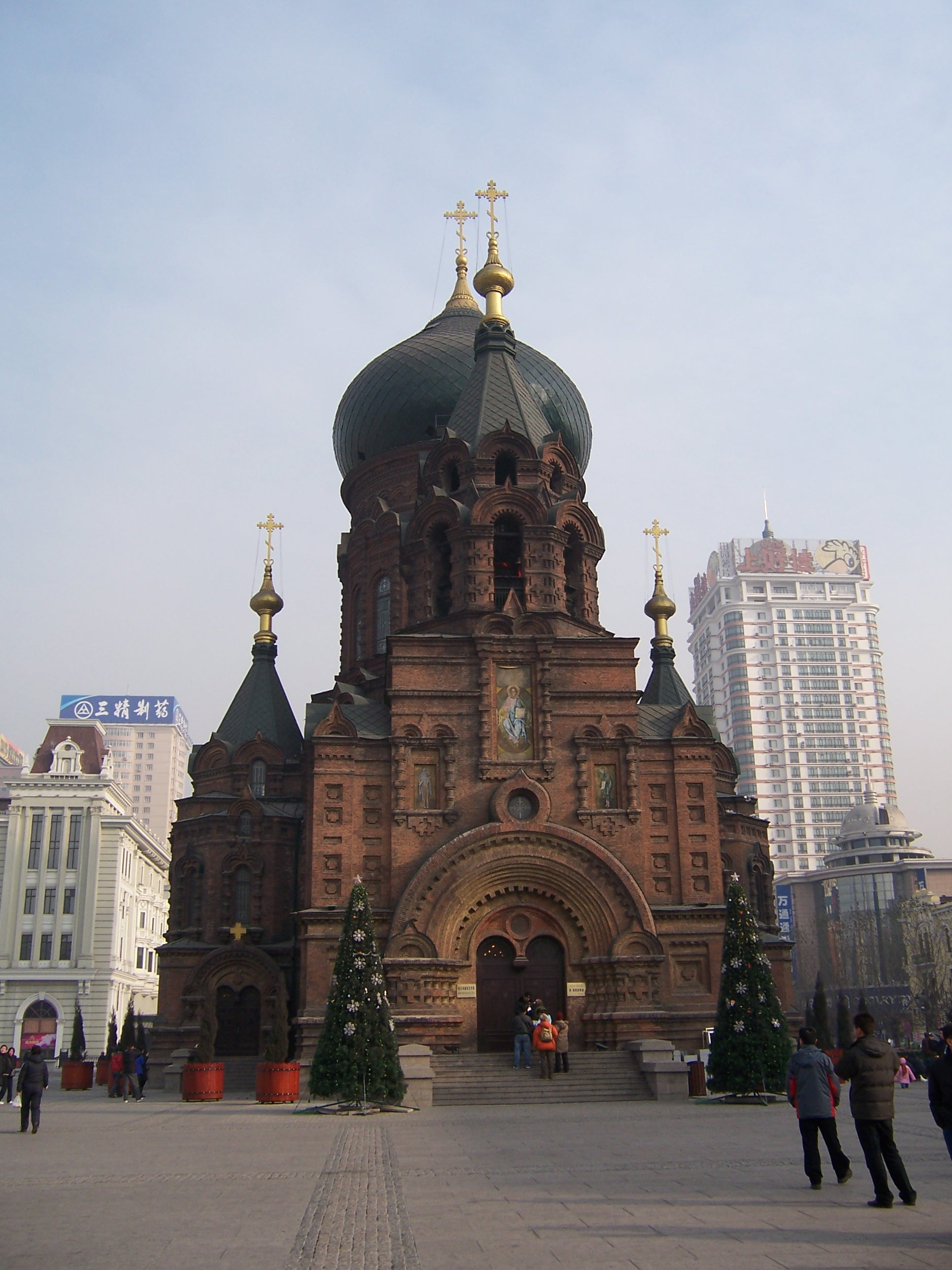
- St. Sophia Cathedral

Location
- Country: China
- Territory: Harbin

Information
- Established: 1922
- Cathedral: St. Nicholas Cathedral

The Diocese of Harbin and Manchuria (Chinese: 哈尔滨教区, Russian: Харбинская и Маньчжурская епархия) is a canonical, structural and territorial-administrative subdivision of the Chinese Orthodox Church.

From 1922 to 1945 it was under the jurisdiction of the Russian Orthodox Church Abroad. The cathedral church is St. Nicholas Cathedral in Harbin. The second cathedral church is St. Sophia Cathedral.

== History ==
Since 1898, parishes in Manchuria were subordinated to the Russian Spiritual Mission in Beijing. However in 1907 the parishes of the CER alienation strip were administratively subordinated to Vladivostok diocese.

A diocese with a cathedra was established in Harbin, for the Orthodox diaspora which had appeared in the territory of Manchuria after the Russian Revolution. The ruling bishop was assigned a title: bishop of Harbin and Tsitsikarsky. The Harbin diocese was independent of the Russian Spiritual Mission in Beijing and was directly subordinate to the Synod of Bishops of the Russian Orthodox Church Abroad.

== Diocesan hierarchs ==
- Methodius (Gerasimov) (March 24, 1922 — March 28, 1931)
- Meletius (Zaborovsky) (April 1, 1931 — April 6, 1946)
- Nestor (Anisimov) (April 1946 - August 18, 1950) imprisoned since June 1948
- Nicander (Viktorov) (June 1948 — February 7, 1956)
- Basil (Shuang) (May 30, 1957 — January 3, 1962) locum tenens, Bishop of Beijing

== See also ==
- Church of the Intercession, Harbin
- Harbin Russians
