= Saint Sophia Cathedral, Harbin =

Former Russian Orthodox Church located in Harbin, Heilongjiang, China

Saint Sophia Cathedral 圣索菲亚教堂 Софийский собор
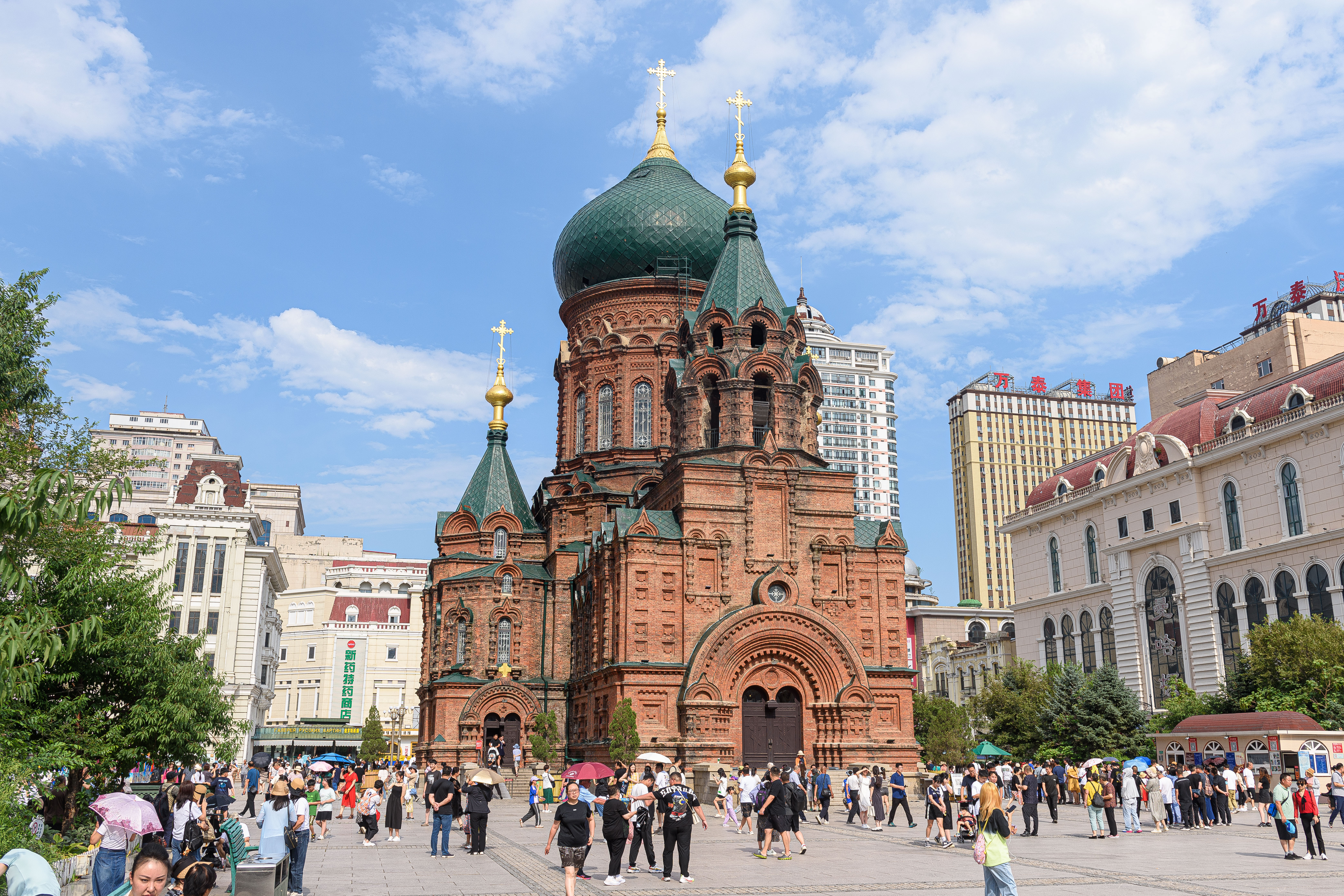
- The Cathedral of the Holy Wisdom of God in Harbin, China. Built in 1907 and expanded from 1923–32, it was closed during the Great Leap Forward and Cultural Revolution periods, and turned into a museum in 1997.

Religion
- Affiliation: None (formerly Russian Orthodox Church)
- Status: Museum

Location
- Location: Harbin, China
- Interactive map of Saint Sophia Cathedral 圣索菲亚教堂; Софийский собор
- Coordinates: 45°46′05″N 126°37′17″E

Architecture
- Type: Church
- Style: Russian Revival architecture
- Groundbreaking: 1907
- Completed: 1932
- Height (max): 53.35 m

Saint Sophia Cathedral, Harbin

Chinese name
- Simplified Chinese: 圣索菲亚教堂
- Traditional Chinese: 聖索菲亞教堂
Transcriptions
Standard Mandarin
- Hanyu Pinyin: Shèng Suǒfēiyà Jiàotáng

Russian name
- Russian: Софийский собор в Харбине
- Romanization: Sofiyskiy sobor v Kharbine

The Cathedral of the Holy Wisdom of God or Saint Sophia Cathedral in Harbin (Chinese: 圣索菲亚教堂; Russian: Софийский собор) is a former Russian Orthodox church located in the central district of Daoli, Harbin, Heilongjiang, China.

== History ==
St. Sophia Orthodox Cathedral was built in 1907 after the completion of the Trans-Siberian Railway in 1903, which connected Vladivostok to northeast China. The Russian No. 4 Army Division arrived in this region just after Russia's loss to the Japanese in the Russo-Japanese War (1904–1905). St. Sophia Church was built and completed of timber in March, 1907 as part of a plan to reconsolidate the confidence of the army by building an imposing spiritual symbol.

In 1921, Harbin had a population of 300,000, including 100,000 Russians. The church was expanded and renovated from September 23, 1923, when a ceremony was held to celebrate the laying of the cornerstone, to its completion on November 25, 1932, after nine years. The present-day St. Sophia Church was hailed as a monumental work of art and the largest Orthodox church in the Far East.

According to Harbin municipal religious and Daoli district archives, Fotiy Huo Desheng was the ninth rector of St. Sophia Church of Harbin.

=== Description ===
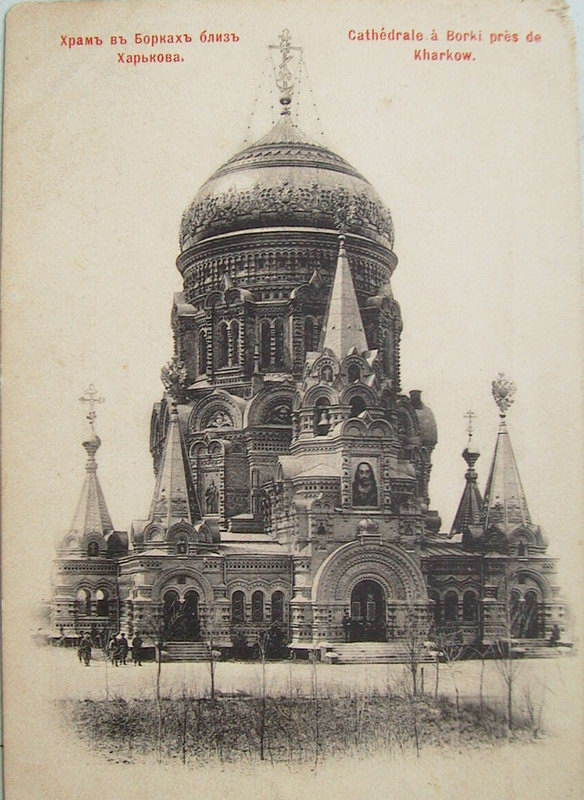
The ornate Christ the Savior Cathedral in Birky, Ukraine, ca. 1894, was the inspiration for the St. Sophia Cathedral in Harbin.

The church is located on the corner of Toulong Street (Toulong Jie) and Zhaolin Street. It stands at 53.3 meters (175 feet) tall, occupies an area of 721 square meters (0.178 acres), and is an example of Russian Revival architecture, inspired by the Cathedral of Christ the Savior in Birky, Ukraine. The main structure is laid out like a cross with the main hall topped with a huge green-tipped dome. Under the bright sun, the church and the square area it stands on look quite like Red Square in Moscow.

=== Closure ===
Following the establishment of the People's Republic of China (PRC) in mainland China in 1949 by the victorious Communists, who ended all Christian missionary work, treaties were signed between the Soviet and Chinese governments that provided for the turning over of Russian churches to Chinese control. The cathedral was thus closed from the period of the Great Leap Forward (1958–61) through the Cultural Revolution (1966–76).

Although the cathedral's sturdy structure withstood its intended destruction during the Cultural Revolution, its empty hull became a warehouse for a nearby state-run department store, its windows were bricked up and saplings grew from the roof. Prefabricated concrete high-rises boxed the church in on all four sides, coming within yards of its walls, making the cathedral inaccessible and invisible from the street. For decades it remained the invisible center of the city, surrounded by decorative material stalls, an auto body shop, a pen factory, and apartments for city government employees, until the Beijing government designated the cathedral a national cultural heritage site in 1996 as part of a nationwide campaign to protect historical sites.

=== Restoration of the Cathedral (Old Harbin Nostalgia) ===
Following its designation in 1996 as a national cultural heritage site (First class Preserved Building), a newspaper article about the "hidden" cathedral prompted donations from locals to restore the church. Local corporations, individual businesses as well as workers from nearby department stores donated money to restore the cathedral and renovate the square. A total of 12,000,000 yuan (approximately $1.5 million US) were eventually gathered and the cathedral regained its visibility in 1997, as the surrounding buildings were torn down.

A new "Harbin Architecture Square" highlighted the cathedral with a fountain at its entrance when it was re-opened to the public.

=== Museum ===
As of 1997 the cathedral was turned into the Municipal Architecture and Art Museum (Harbin Architectural Art Gallery), showcasing the multi-cultural architectural developments of Harbin throughout the ages. At the official ceremony on September 2, 1997, to celebrate the restoration of Hagia Sophia Cathedral, Mayor Wang Guangdao underlined the cultural and economic benefits expected from the project:

"The restoration of Hagia Sophia Cathedral inspired the people of Harbin, raised the level of our culture, let the whole of China and foreign friends know China, and opened a way for faster economic development."

The restoration was the culmination of the Harbin municipal government's attempt to turn the city's colonial era structures into tourist attractions by restoring and granting them landmark status. The restored structures are said to signify civilization (wenming) and culture (wenhua).

== Gallery ==
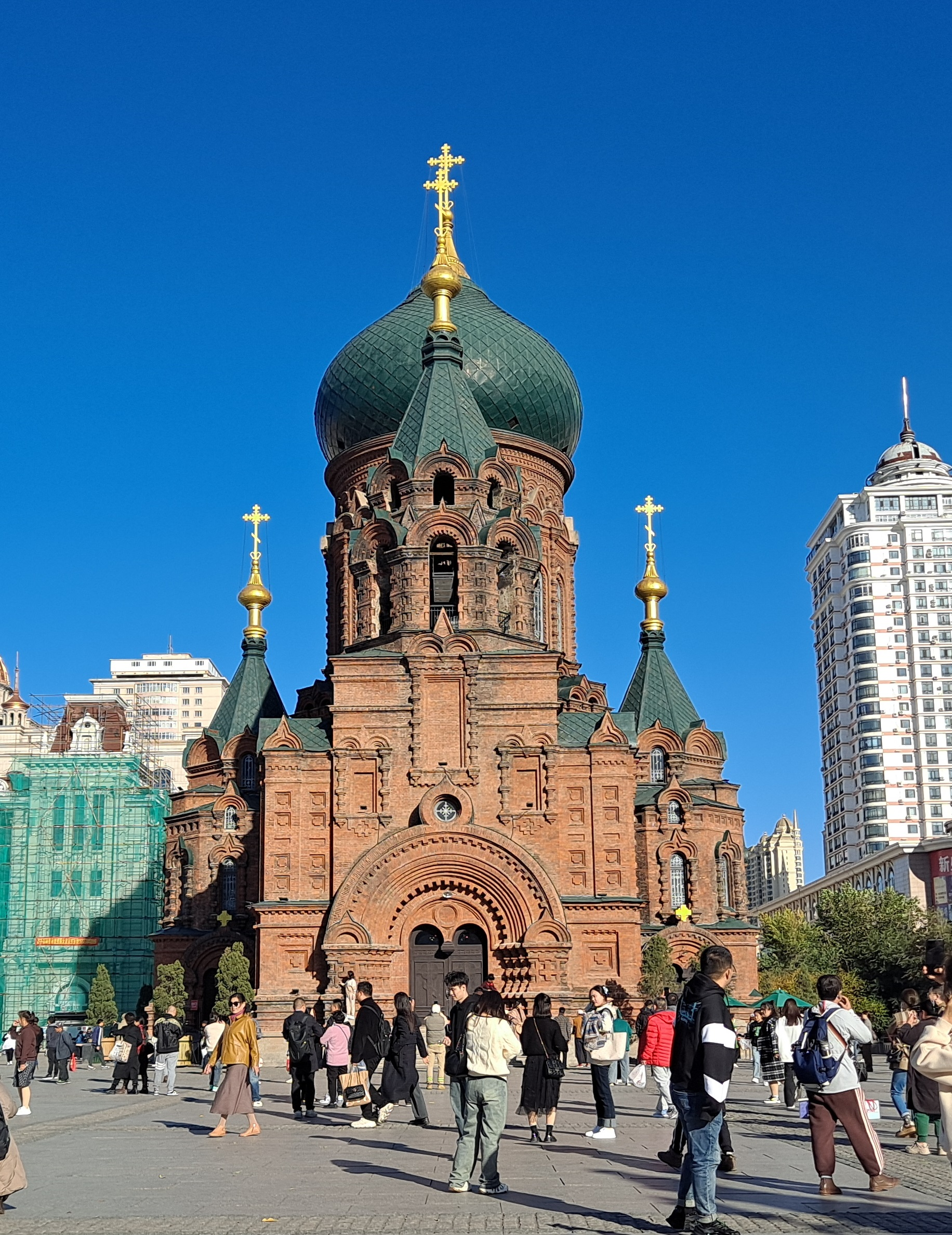

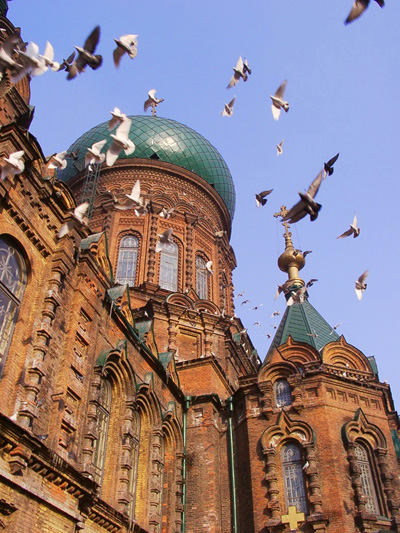

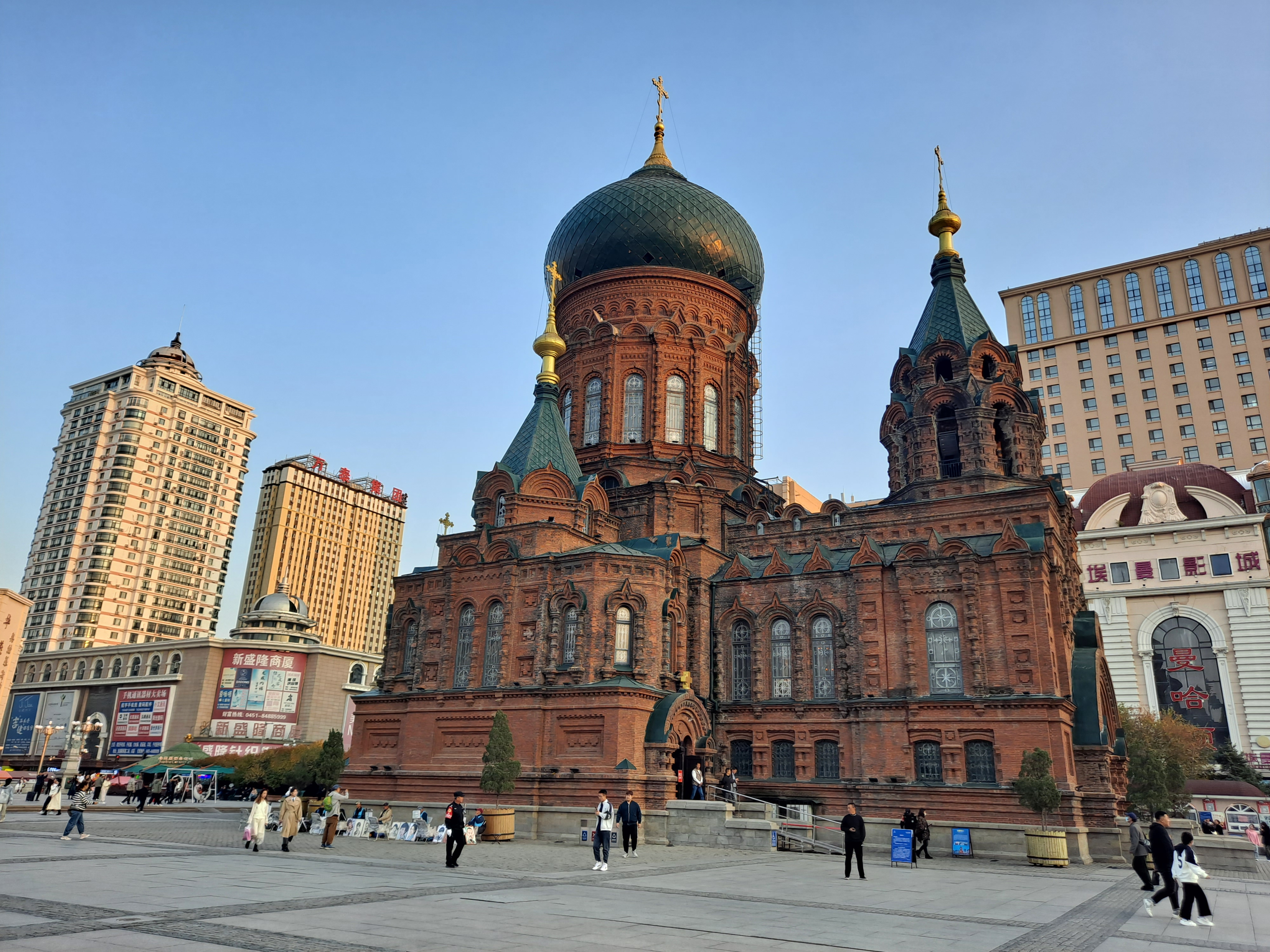

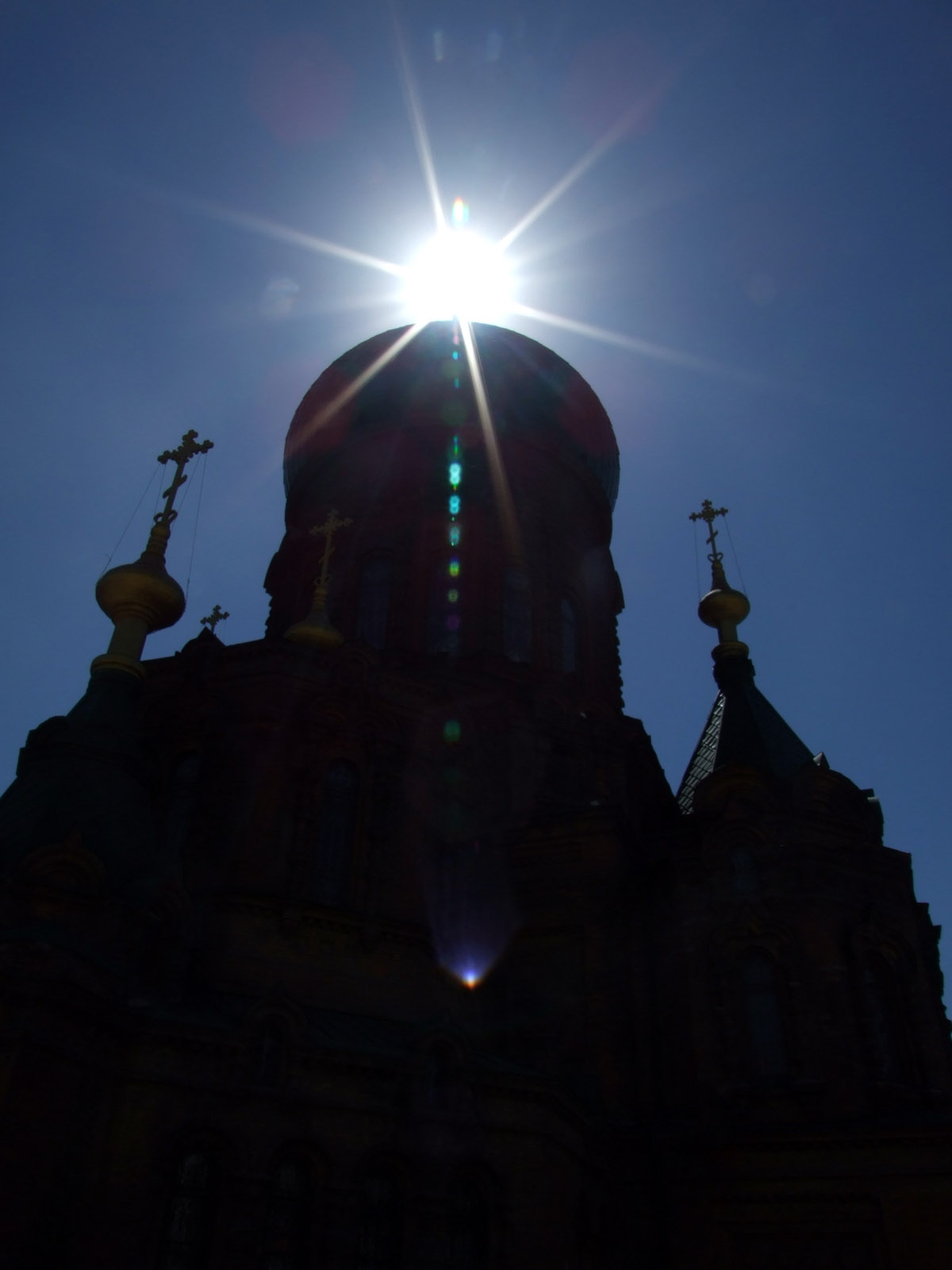

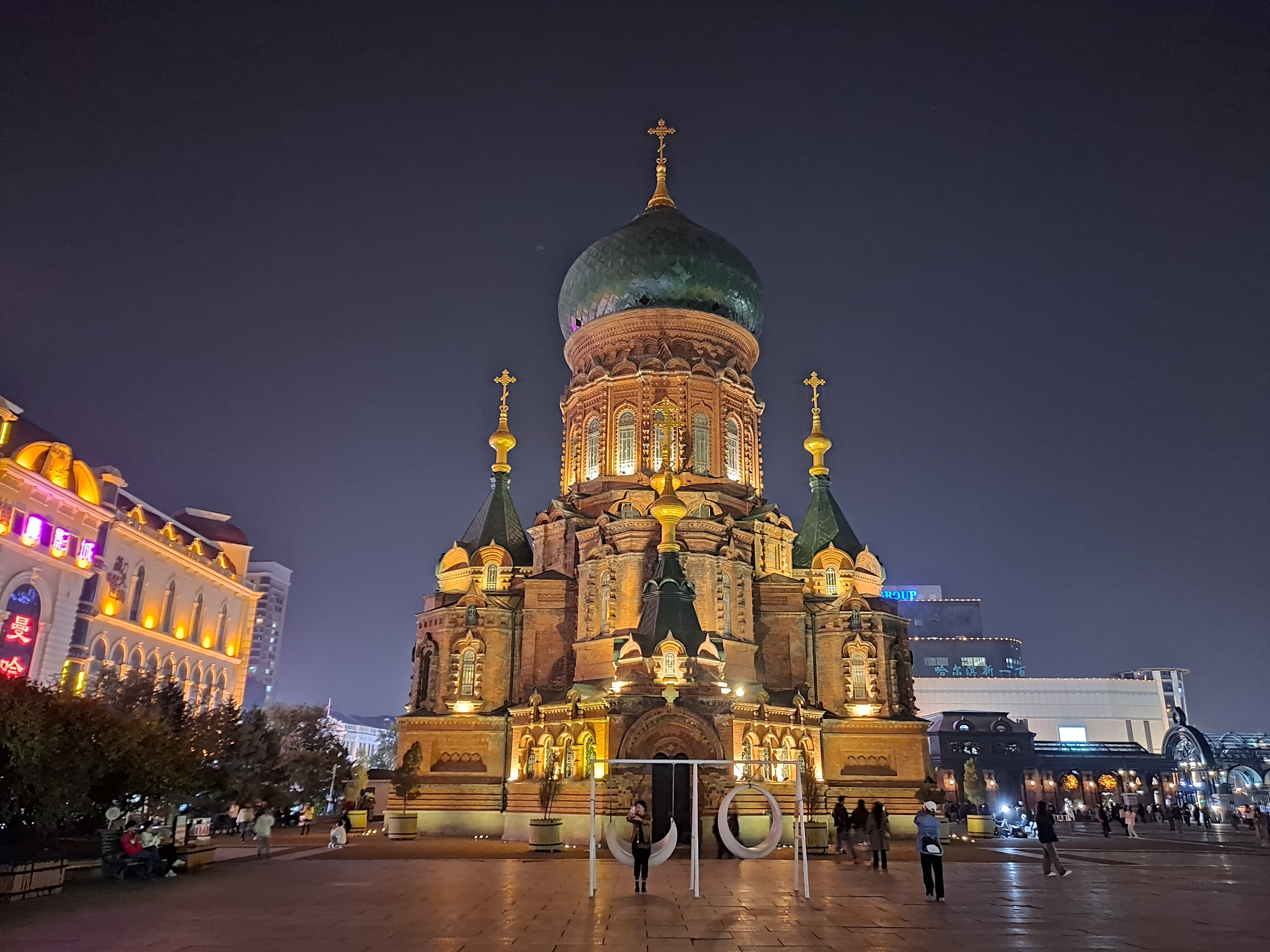

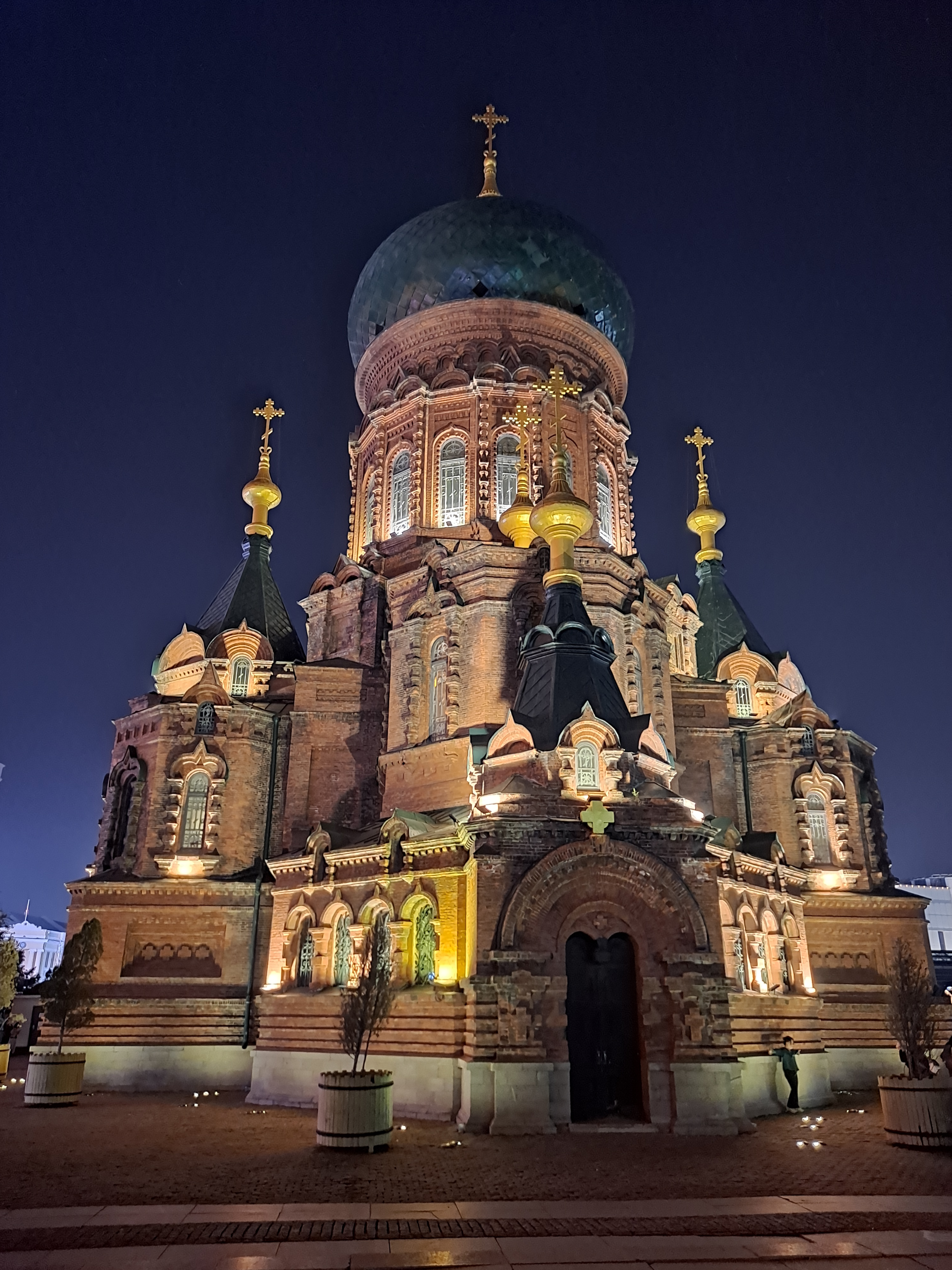

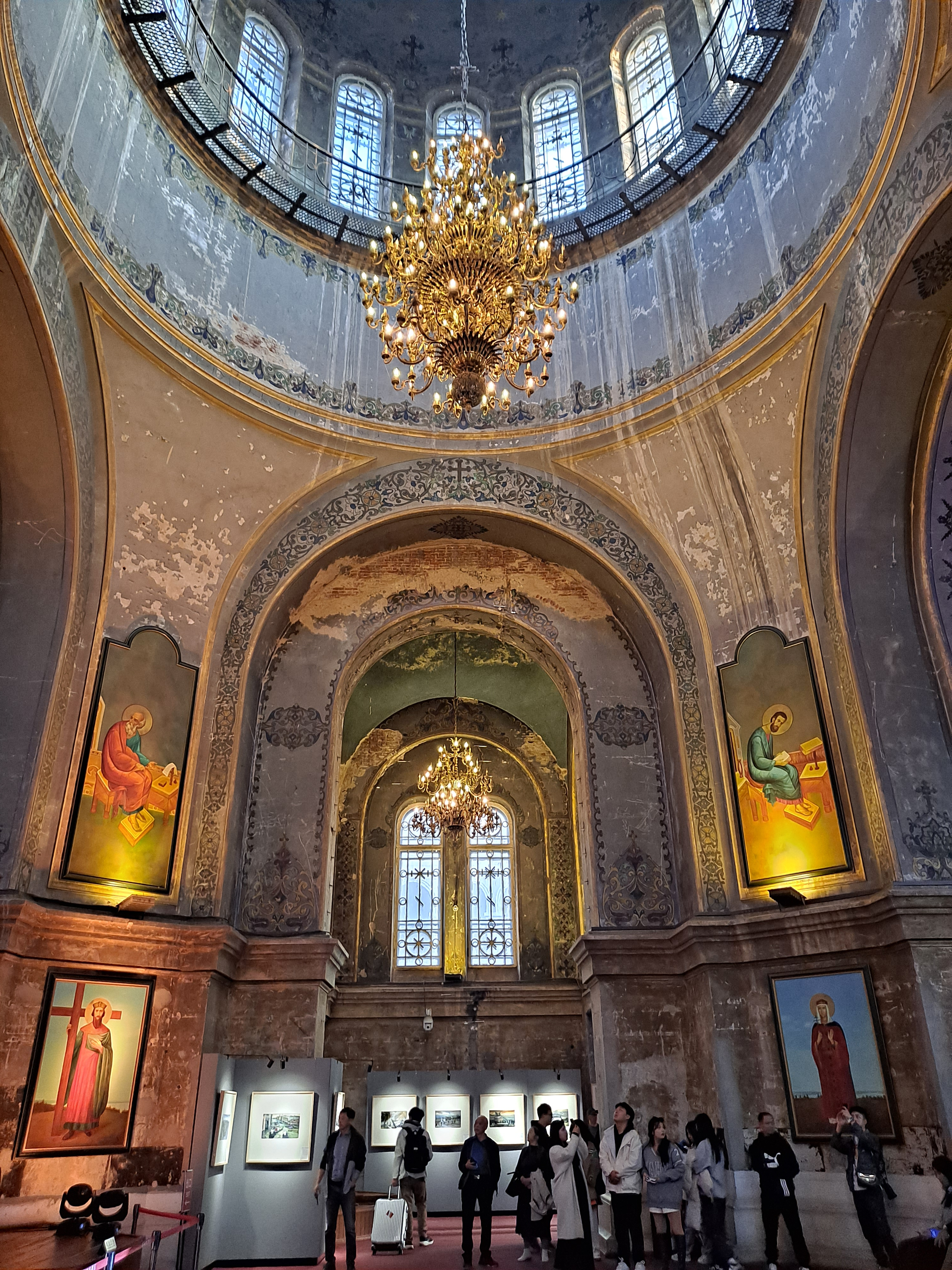

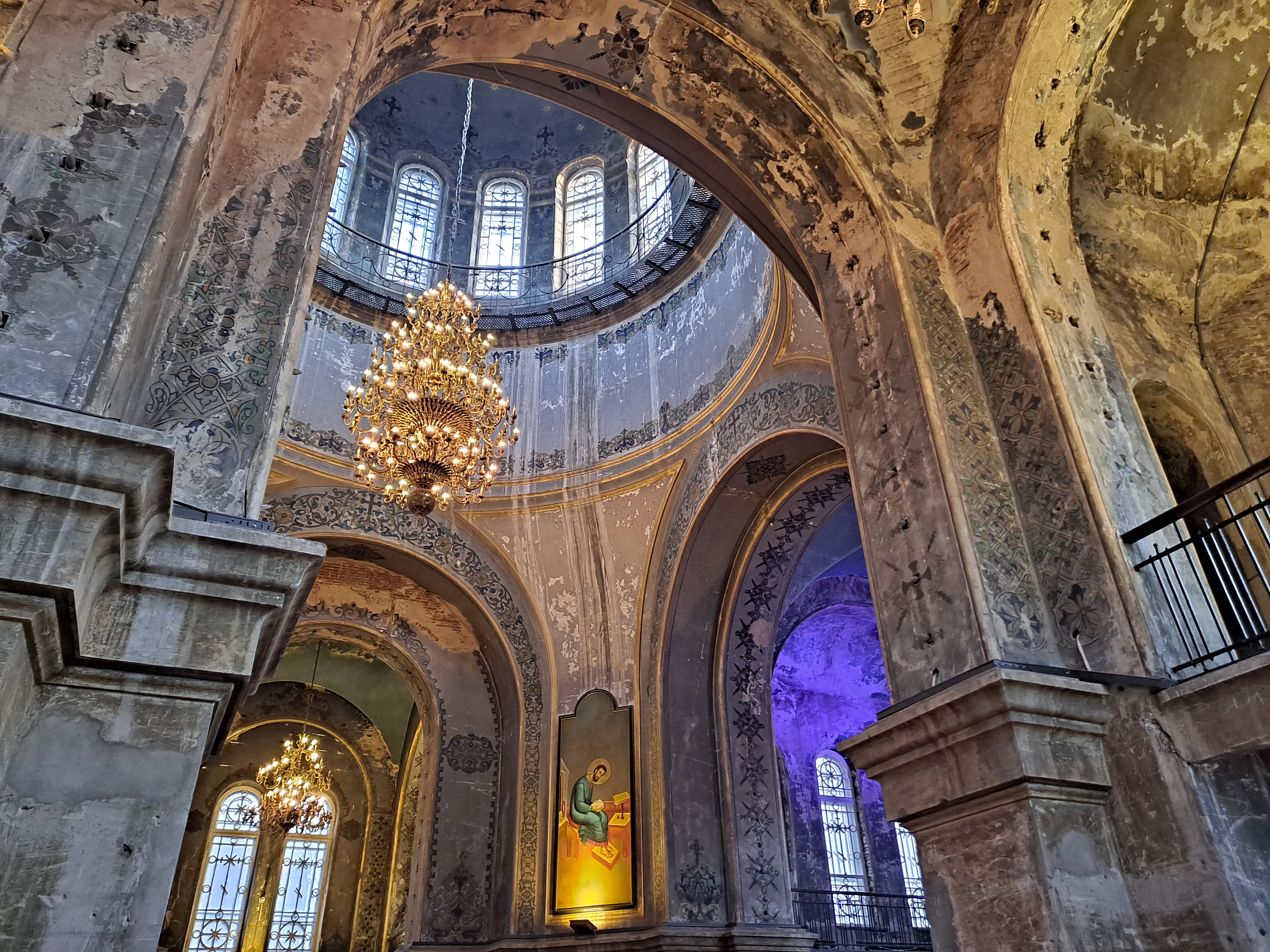

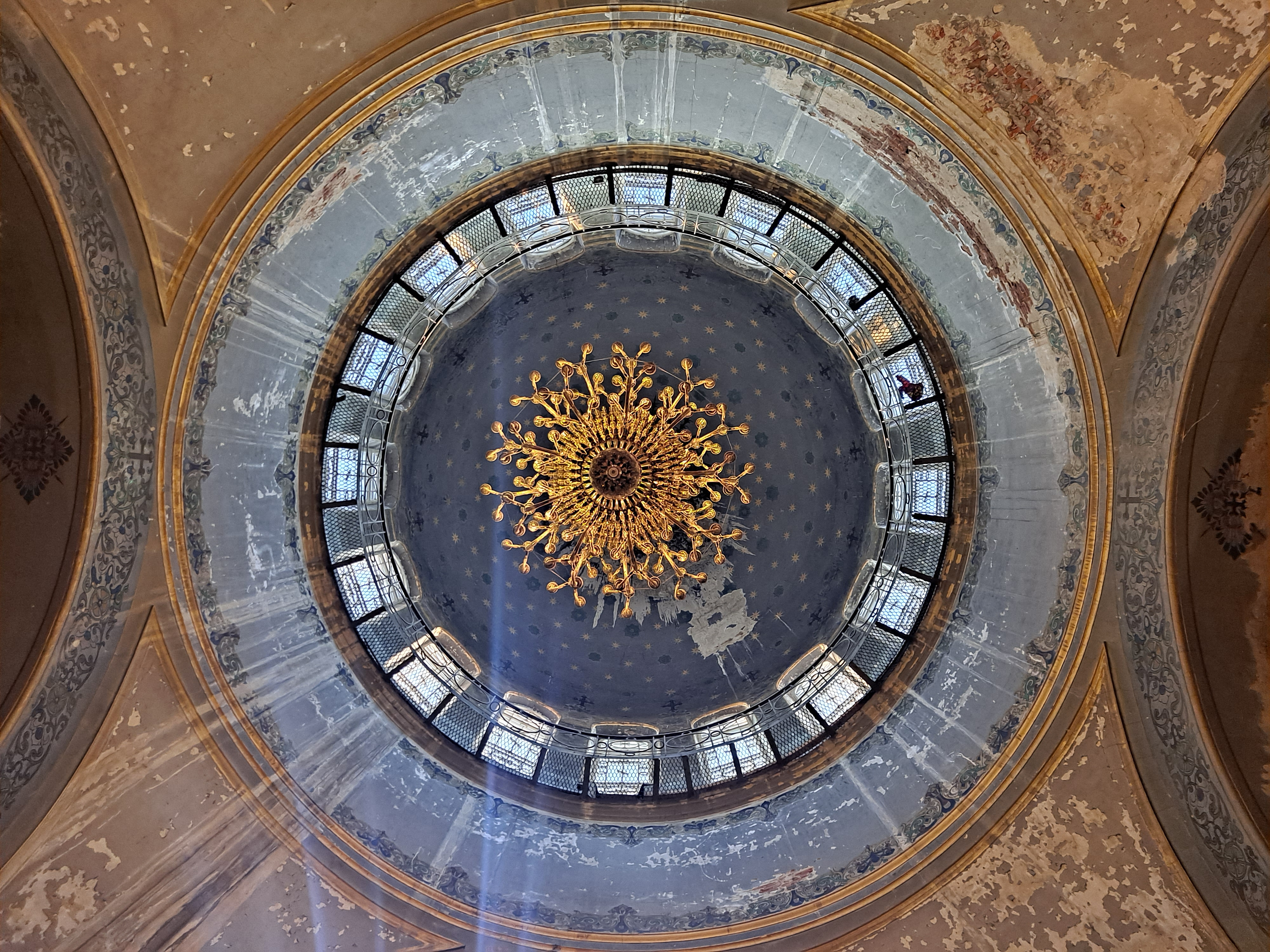

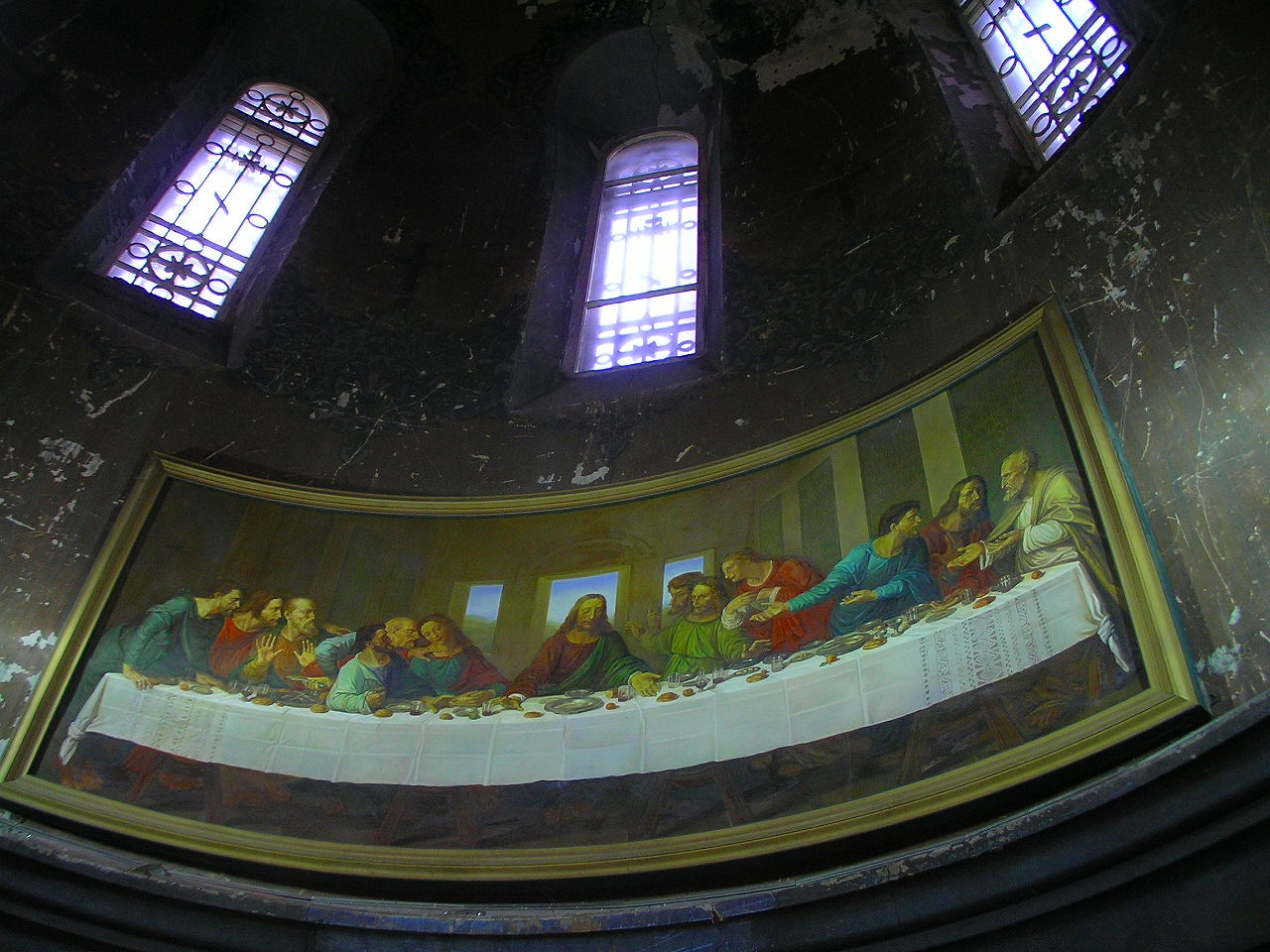

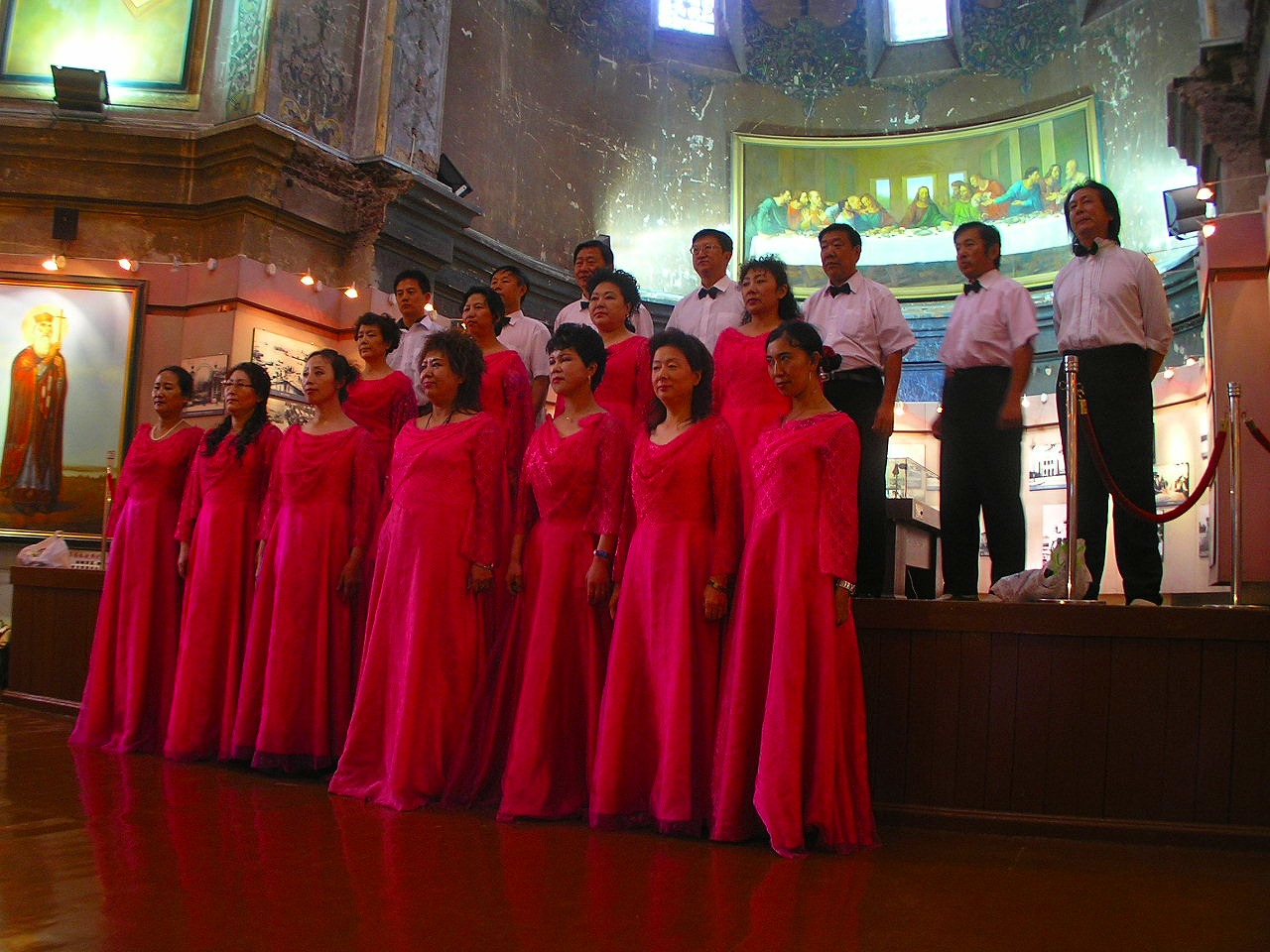

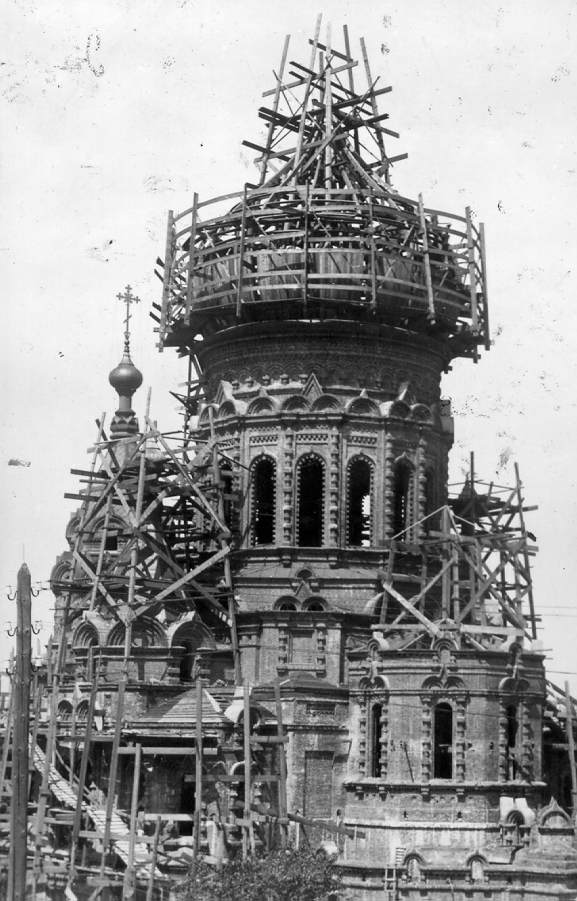

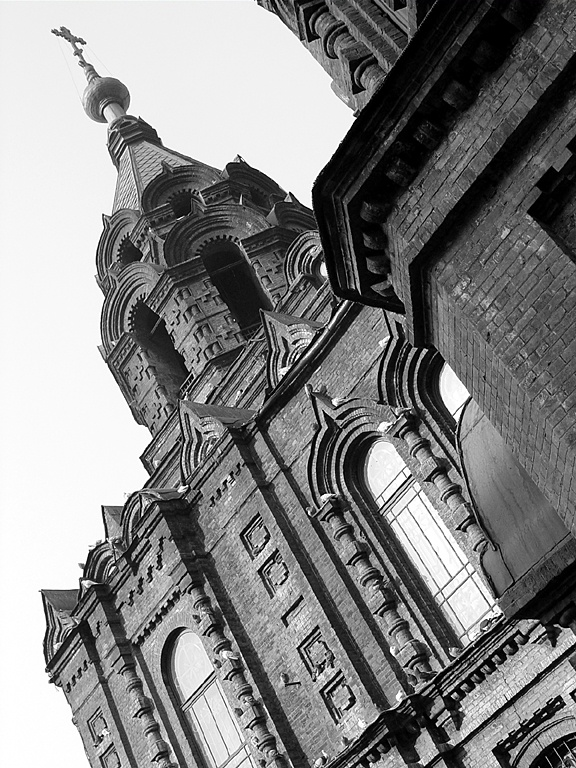

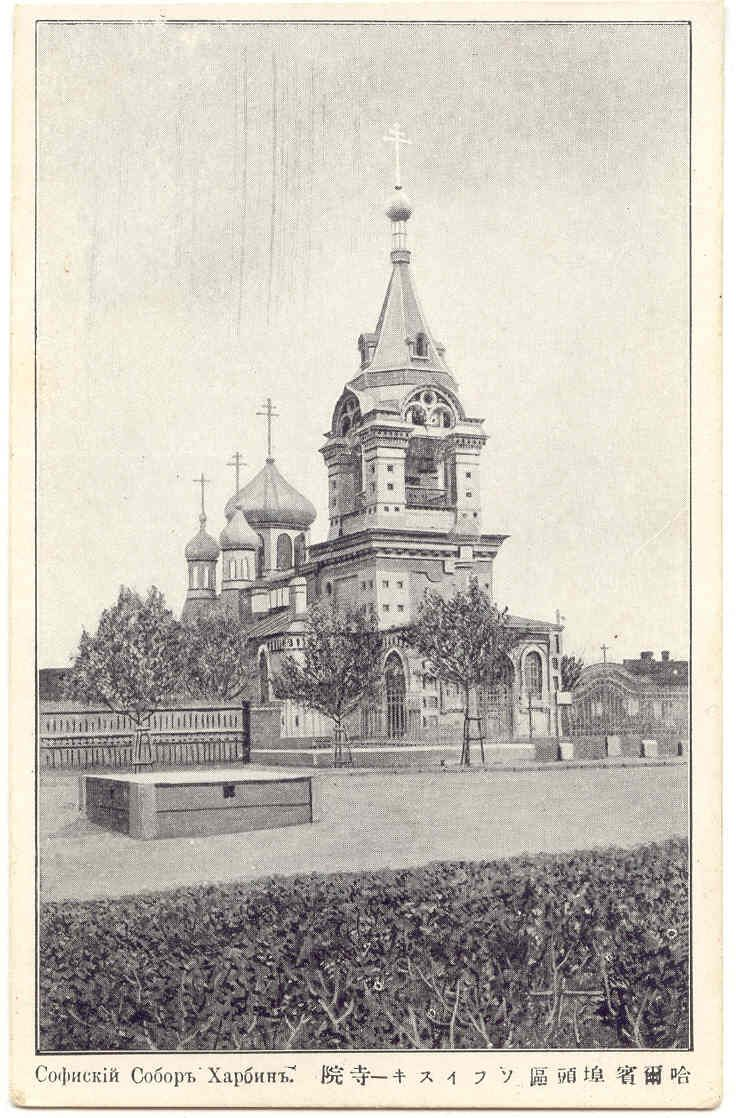
St. Sofia church in Harbin before reconstruction

== See also ==
- Russian Revival architecture
- Chinese Orthodox Church
- Christianity in China
- Harbin Russians
- Russians in China
- Russian Orthodox Church

Churches in Harbin

- Church of the Intercession in Harbin (Orthodox)
- Harbin Nangang Christian Church (Protestant)
- Sacred Heart Cathedral of Harbin (Roman Catholic)

== Sources and further reading ==
- David Wolff. To the Harbin Station: The Liberal Alternative in Russian Manchuria, 1898-1914. Stanford University Press, 1999.
- Yukiko Koga. "The Atmosphere of a Foreign Country": Harbin's Architectural Inheritance. In: Anne M. Cronin, Kevin Hetherington. Consuming the Entrepreneurial City: Image, Memory, Spectacle. Routledge, 2008.
- Saint-Sophia Church. Government of Harbin website.
- "PRESERVED BUILDINGS." Harbin Urban and Rural Planning Bureau.
- "St. Sophia Church." China Spring Tour.
