= Harbin Russians =

Several generations of Russians who lived in Harbin, Heilongjiang, China

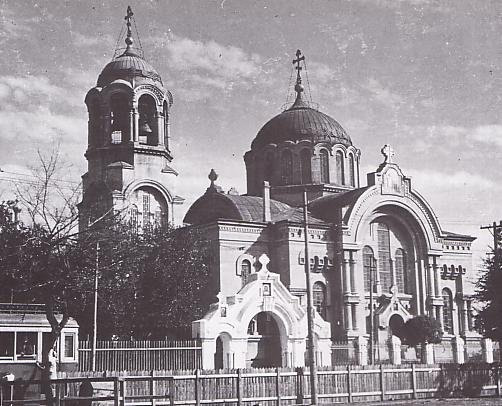
Blagoveshchensky (Annunciation) Church, a Russian Orthodox church in Harbin

Harbin Russians or Russian Harbinites (Russian: харбинские русские, romanized: kharbinskiye russkie, Chinese: 哈尔滨白俄; pinyin: Hā'ěrbīn bái'è; lit. 'Harbin White Russians') refers to several generations of Russians who lived in the city of Harbin, Heilongjiang, China. Russian settlers were responsible for turning Harbin into a Russian city with the majority of the population being from Russian ethnic groups, from approximately 1898 to the mid-1960s. Harbin, a major junction city on the Chinese Eastern Railway (CER), came successively under the control of the Qing dynasty, under Russia's sphere of influence, the Republic of China, Japanese puppet state Manchukuo, the USSR and the People's Republic of China in this period.

The people in the Soviet Union used the terms "KVZhDist" (Russian: КВЖДист, "person of the China Eastern Railway" Russian: КВЖД) and "Harbinets" (Харбинец, "Harbinite/person from Harbin") to refer to a person with any type of ties to the China Eastern Railway.

== History ==
=== Settlement ===
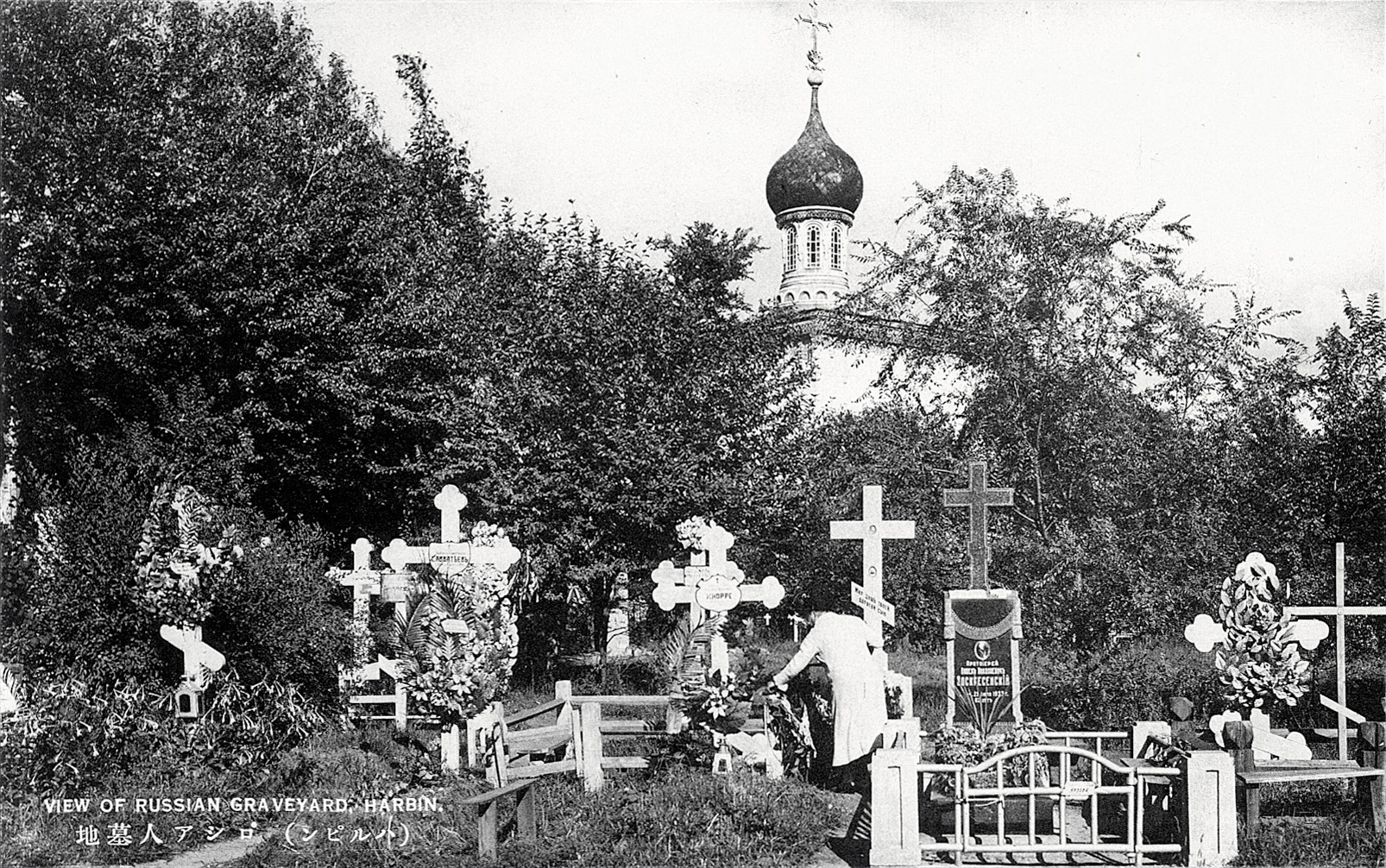
Russian orthodox churchyard in Harbin

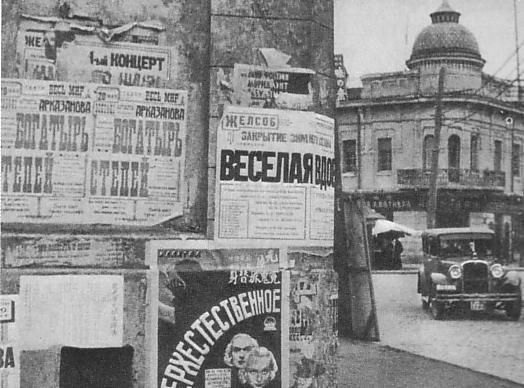
Russian advertisements in Harbin

The first generation of Harbin Russians were mostly the builders and employees of the Chinese Eastern Railway. They moved to Harbin in order to work on the railroad. At the time Harbin was not an established city. The city was built almost entirely from scratch by the builders and early settlers. Houses were constructed, furniture and personal items were brought in from Russia. After the Russo-Japanese War, while many Russians left Harbin, a lot of long-time residents decided to stay. By 1913, Harbin had become an established Russian colony for the construction and maintenance work on the China Eastern Railway. A record shows Harbin had a total of 68,549 people, most of Russian and Chinese descent. There were a total of 53 different nationalities. Along with Russian and Chinese, there were 45 spoken languages used in Harbin at the time. Only 11.5% of all residents were born in Harbin. There were also lively religious activities, by the Russians (Saint Sophia Cathedral in Harbin), Ukrainians (Church of the Intercession in Harbin), Poles (Sacred Heart Cathedral of Harbin), Germans (Harbin Nangang Christian Church), Danish (Danish Lutheran Church), Russian Molokane, and others. A few kilometers from Harbin, around the railway station of Asheng (Ashihé), there was, until 1955, a settlement of hundreds of White Russians. A large community, it had an orthodox church, independent college, library and social club. The common language was Russian, with some Siberian variations. Many Czarist Imperial officers amongst "old believers" contributed to maintain strong links to Russian culture, literature and music. Almost the entire population of Asheng emigrated to Australia and Brazil.

=== World War I and the Russian Revolution ===
In the decade from 1913 to 1923, Russia went through World War I, the Russian Revolution, and the Russian Civil War. In the 1920s Harbin was flooded with 100,000 to 200,000 White émigrés fleeing from Russia. They were mostly officers and soldiers involved in the White movement, members of the White governments in Siberia and Russian Far East. There were both the intelligentsia and ordinary people. While many fleeing the Russian Revolution and Civil War stayed in Harbin, large numbers merely used Harbin as a way point to other destinations across the Pacific. Harbin held the largest Russian population outside of the state of Russia.

=== Under Chinese control ===
On September 8, 1920, the Republic of China announced that it would no longer recognize the Russian consulates in China. On September 23, China ceased relations with representatives of the Russian Empire and deprived Russians of extraterritorial rights. Overnight, Russians in China found themselves stateless. Shortly afterward, the Chinese government took over control of institutions in Harbin such as courts, police, prison, post office, and some research and educational institutions.

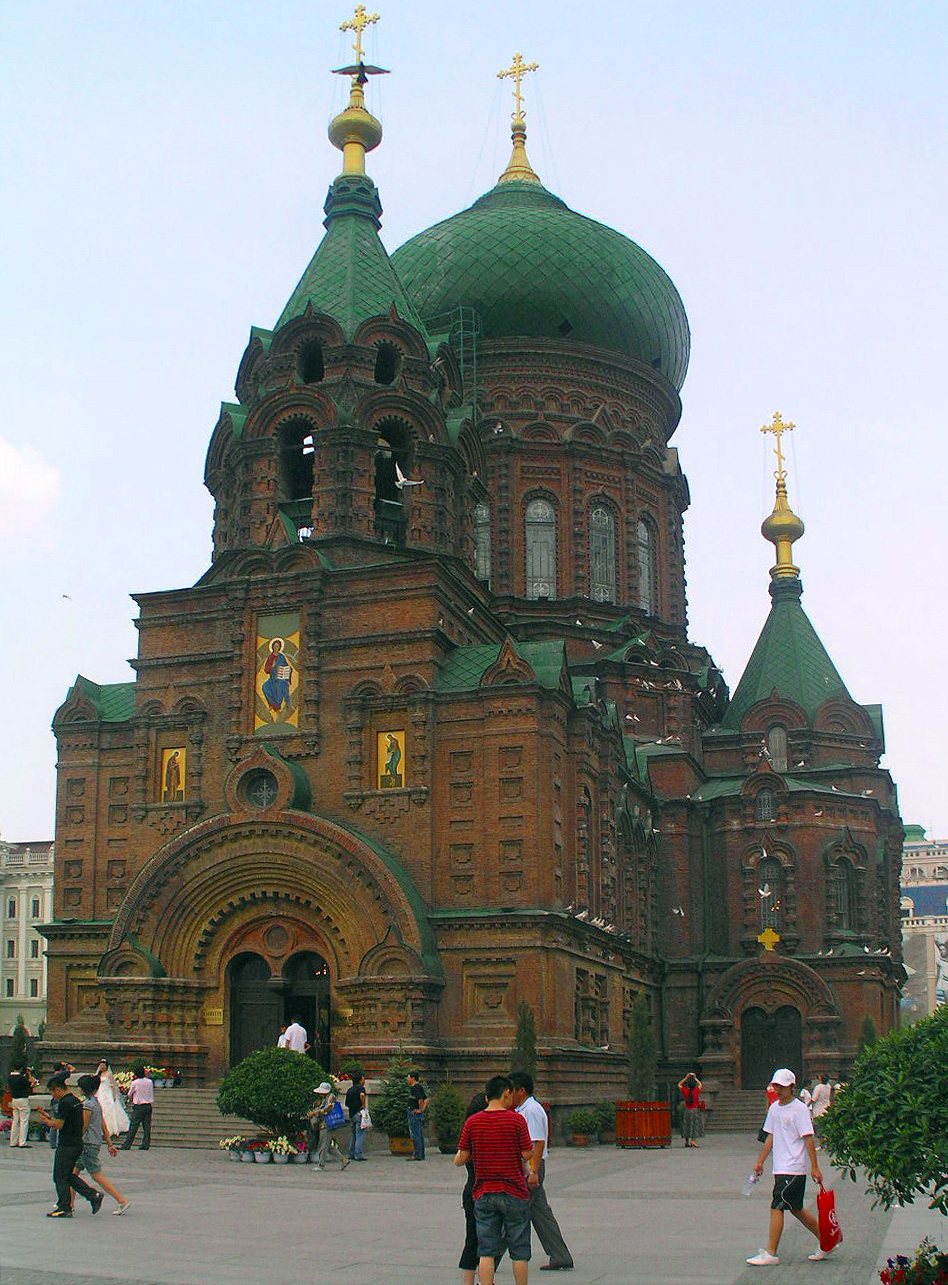
Russian Orthodox Saint Sofia Church built in 1907, Harbin

In 1924, an agreement was signed in Beijing regarding the control of the Chinese Eastern Railway. The agreement stated that only Soviet and Chinese citizens could be employed by the CER. This meant the Harbin Russians had to choose not only their nationality, but also their political identity. Many Harbin Russians took Soviet citizenship for patriotic reasons or a genuine support for communism. However, there were also Harbin Russians who remained stateless who were eventually let go from CER. Gradually, the national and the political identity of the Harbin Russians split the group into opposing sides. This eventually led to a strongly pro-Soviet sentiment in Harbin.

In 1929, the Congregation of Marian Fathers of the Immaculate Conception opened the Lyceum St. Nicholas, which educated the Christian male elite until 1949.

=== Japanese occupation ===
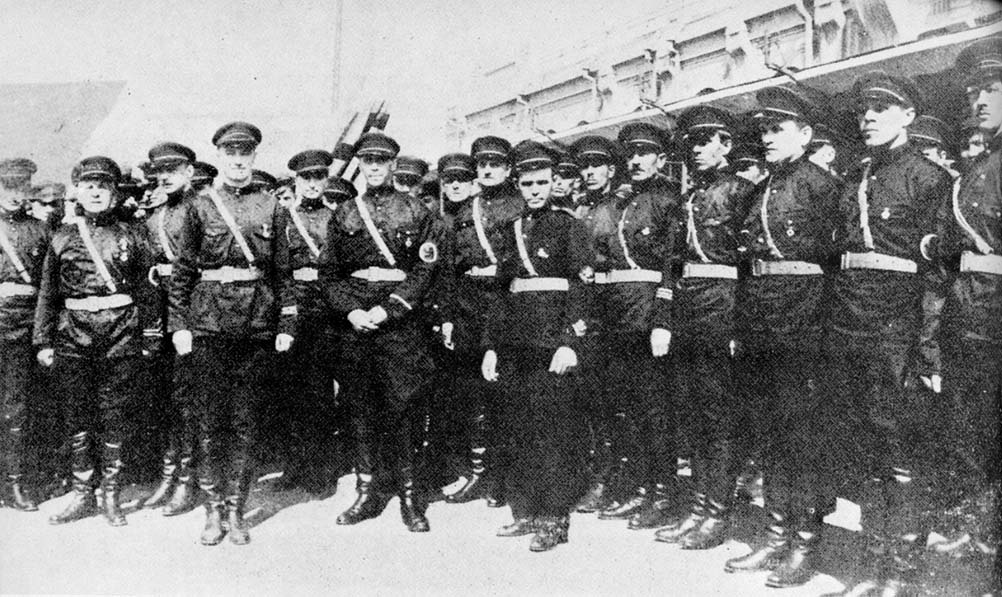
Anti-Soviet Russian Fascists, inspired by Italian fascism, in Harbin, 1934.

In the 1930s, the Japanese occupied Manchuria, and turned it into the puppet state of Manchukuo. In 1935, the Soviet Union sold its share of the China Eastern Railway to Japan via Manchukuo. In the spring and summer of 1935, thousands of Harbin Russians went on trains with their passports and belongings, and left for the Soviet Union.

Many Harbin Russians returned to the Soviet Union after 1935. After the return most of them were arrested, accused of anti-Soviet activities and a large number of them were executed.

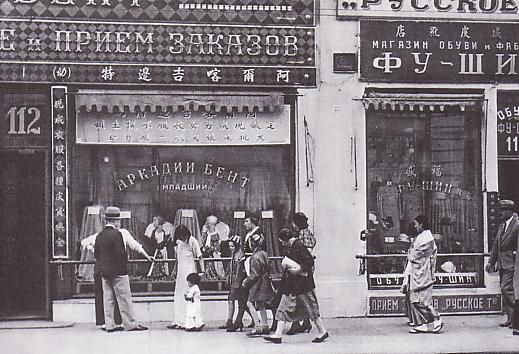
Russian stores in Harbin

Some Harbin Russians moved to other cities, such as Shanghai, Beijing, Tianjin, and Qingdao, and eventually left China. By the 1930s, Shanghai's Russian community had grown to 25,000.

The anti-Communist Harbin Russians formed the Russian Fascist Party (RFP). The RFP was anti-semitic and harassed the Jewish Harbin Russians with, among other things, kidnappings, and many Russian Jews therefore left Harbin. In 1934, the Japanese formed the Bureau for Russian Emigrants in Manchuria, (BREM} who were nominally under the control of RFP; the BREM provided identification papers necessary to live, work and travel in Manchukuo. White General Vladimir Kislitsin acted as BREM's chairman between 1938 and 1942. Ataman Grigory Semyonov, himself much in favor with the Japanese, replaced him from 1943 to 1945.

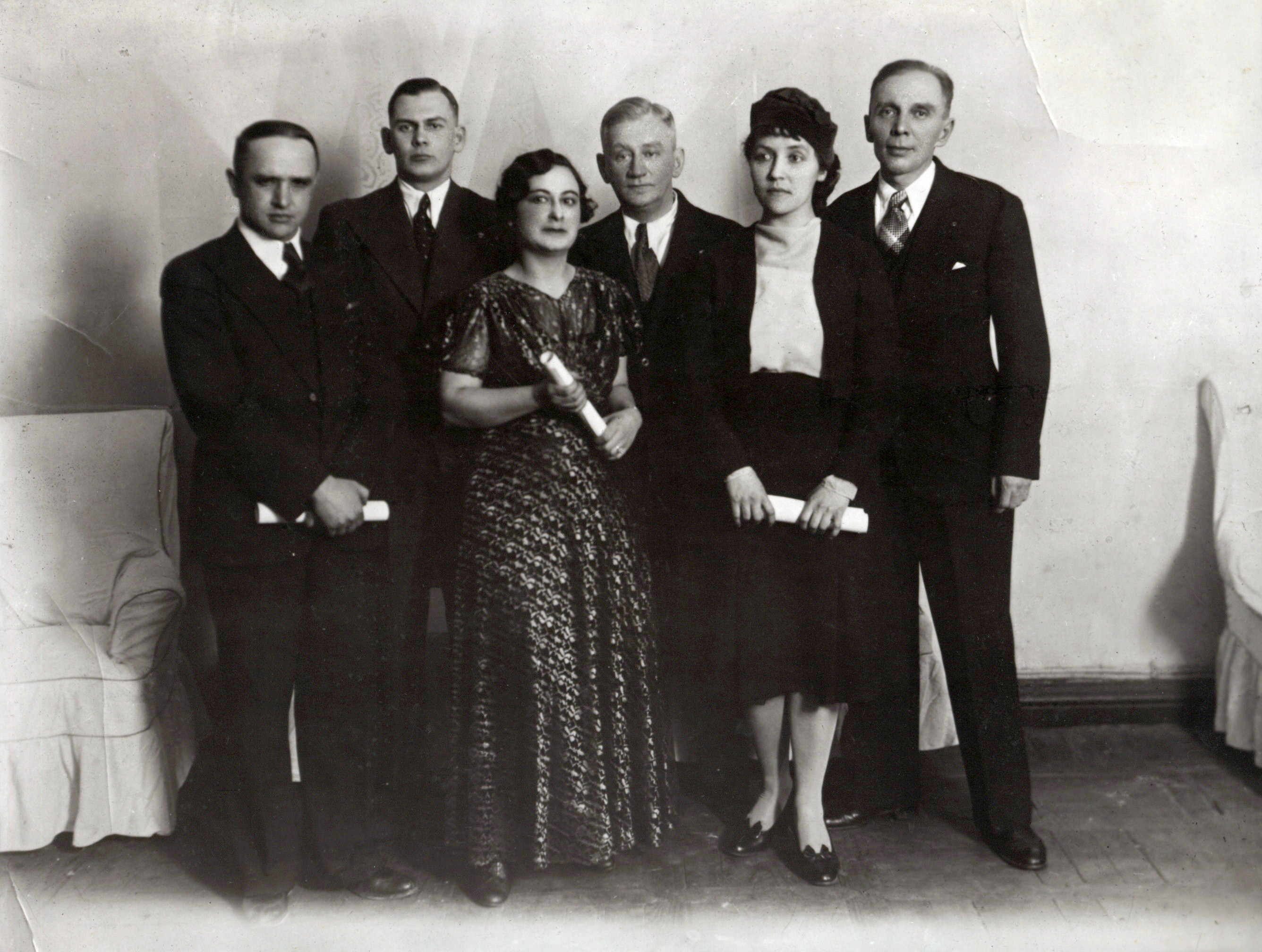
Russian poets in Harbin, 1930s

The Harbin Russians were left to choose between a Soviet citizenship or to remain stateless by support of the BREM. The stateless Russians were officially favored by the regime, but in reality, they were not trusted and exposed to a great risk of being arrested as spies for the Soviet Union. They were also often enlisted in the army for work along the border to the Soviet Union. After the Nazis invaded the Soviet Union in 1941 they were in an even more sensitive situation. To separate the anti-Soviet Russians from the Soviet Russians, the former were ordered to wear a badge with the colors of the Czar — later, a white numbered disk of aluminum.

The Soviet Russians were excluded from the Russian schools and their property was often confiscated, but they were under the protection of the Soviet Embassy.

=== After World War II ===
In 1945, after the Soviet Army occupied Harbin, the Soviets held a series of trials for all the Harbin Russians they identified as White Guardists and those who had collaborated with the Japanese authorities; many were sentenced to labour camps.

In 1949, following the establishment of the People's Republic of China — some Harbin Russians migrated to Taiwan, the United Kingdom, the United States, Canada, Australia.

After 1952, the Soviet Union initiated a second wave of repatriation of Harbin Russians. By the mid-1960s virtually all Harbin Russians had left Harbin, most of them immigrating to the USSR. There were several Russian connections in Australia resulting from refugees leaving Harbin. A good portion of the Russian Old Believers went to South America.

== See also ==
- Ethnic Russians in China
- Shanghai Russians
- Albazin Cossacks
- Chinese Eastern Railway Zone
- Orthodox Diocese of Harbin and Manchuria
- Ukrainians in China
