= Basil Shuang =

Chinese Orthodox Church

His Grace Basil
- Bishop of Beijing
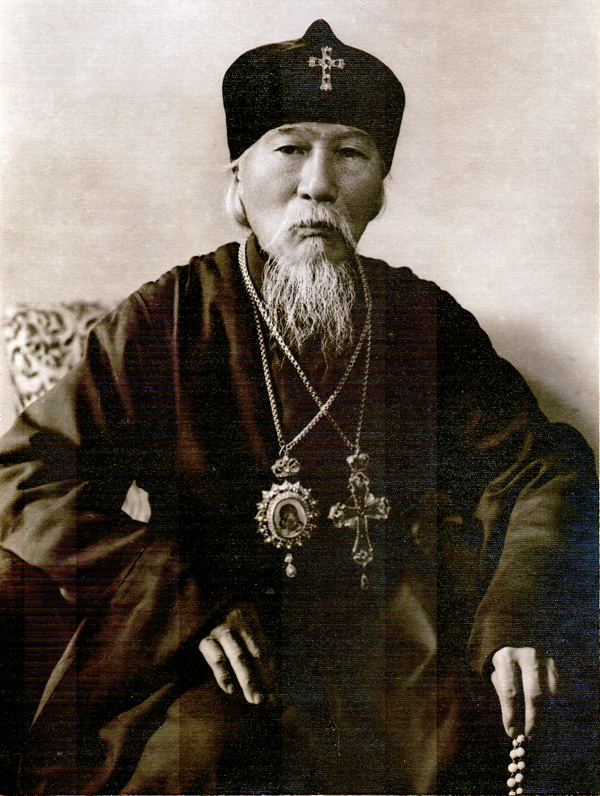
- Native name: Waxili Fu'an
- Church: Chinese Orthodox Church
- Appointed: 1957
- Predecessor: Victor (Svyatin)
- Successor: Vacant

Orders
- Ordination: 1948
- Consecration: 30 May 1957 by Victor (Victorovitch)

Personal details
- Born: Yao Fu'an; 23 December 1888 Beijing, China
- Died: 3 January 1962 (aged 73) Beijing, People's Republic of China

Bishop Basil (Chinese: 主教瓦西里, born Yao Fu'an, Chinese: 姚福安, or Yao Shuanglin, Chinese: 姚双林; 23 December 1888 – 3 January 1962) was a bishop of the Chinese Orthodox Church who served as bishop of Beijing.

== Biography ==
Yao was born in Beijing on 23 December 1888. He graduated from theological seminary at the Russian Orthodox Mission in Beijing and was ordained to the diaconate on 11 May 1915 by Bishop Innocent (Figurovsky).

He served a deacon during 33 years. In 1948, he was ordained to the priesthood. He was elevated to the rank of hegumen in 1948. In 1951, Patriarch Alexy I of Moscow consecrated him as bishop of Tianjin, however Yao did not accept the patriarch's consecration.

In May 1957, he was consecrated as bishop of Beijing. His service continued until the year of 1962 when he died in January of that year.

He was among the only two Chinese priests who became Orthodox bishops. The other was Bishop Symeon Du of Shanghai. After his death, no succeeding bishops were elected in Beijing. The position remains vacant.
