= Church of the Intercession, Harbin =

Eastern Orthodox church in Harbin, China

Coordinates: 45°45′42″N 126°38′41″E

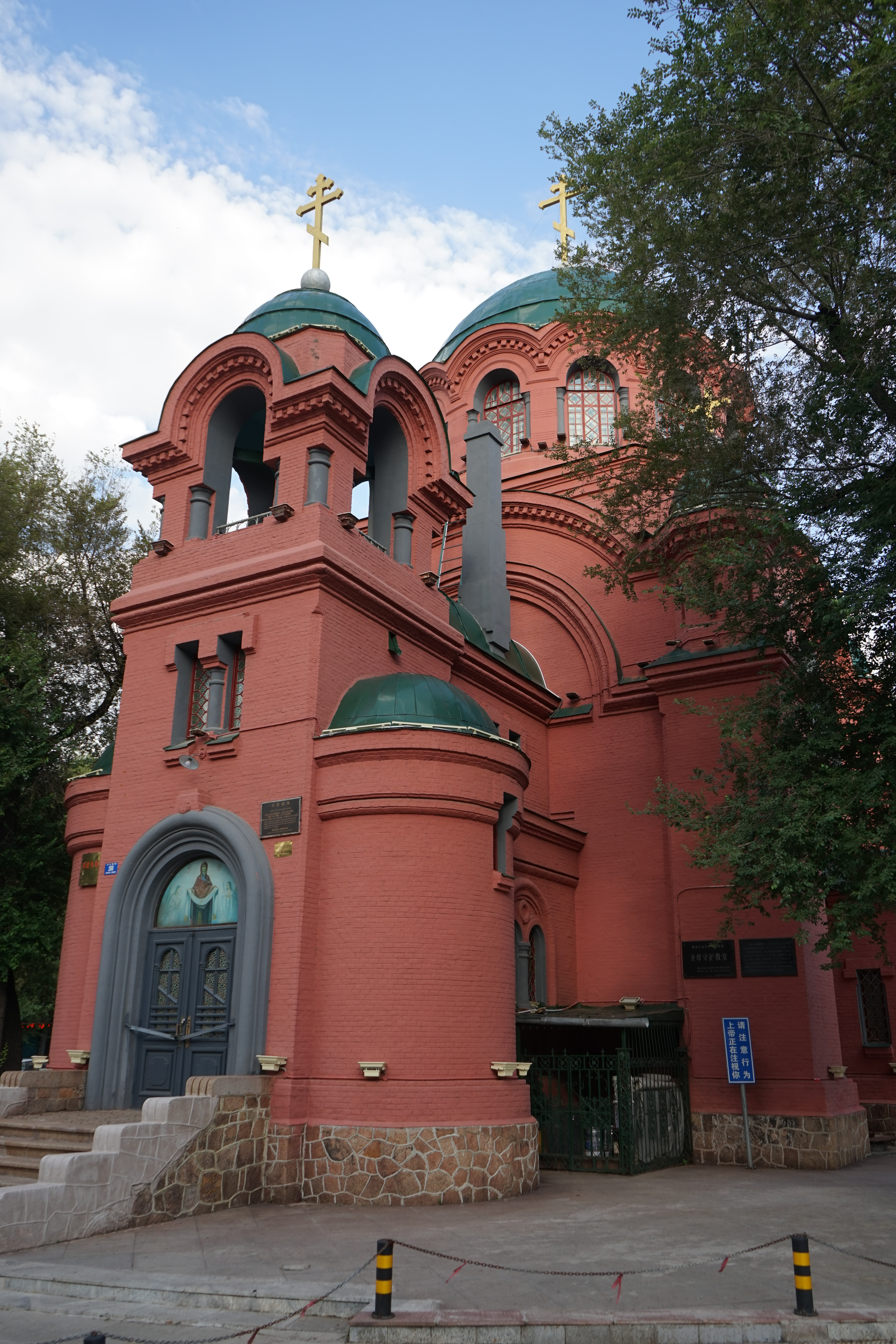
The Church of Our Lady of Harbin

The Church of the Intercession of the Mother of God in Harbin (Note: Chinese: 哈尔滨圣母帡幪教堂; pinyin: Hā'ěrbīn shèngmǔ píng méng jiàotáng; Russian: Храм Покрова Пресвятой Богородицы в Харбине, romanized: Khram Pokrova Presvyatoy Bogoroditsy v Kharbine; Ukrainian: Церква Покрови Пресвятої Богородиці у Харбіні, romanized: Tserkva Pokrovy Presvyatoyi Bohorodytsi u Kharbini) is an Eastern Orthodox church in Harbin, China.

This church is located in the "church street", north east of "Hongbo Square" (where St. Nicolas' Central Church used to be), on East Dazhi Avenue, where there are also Harbin Nangang Christian Church (Protestant) and Sacred Heart Cathedral of Harbin (Catholic).

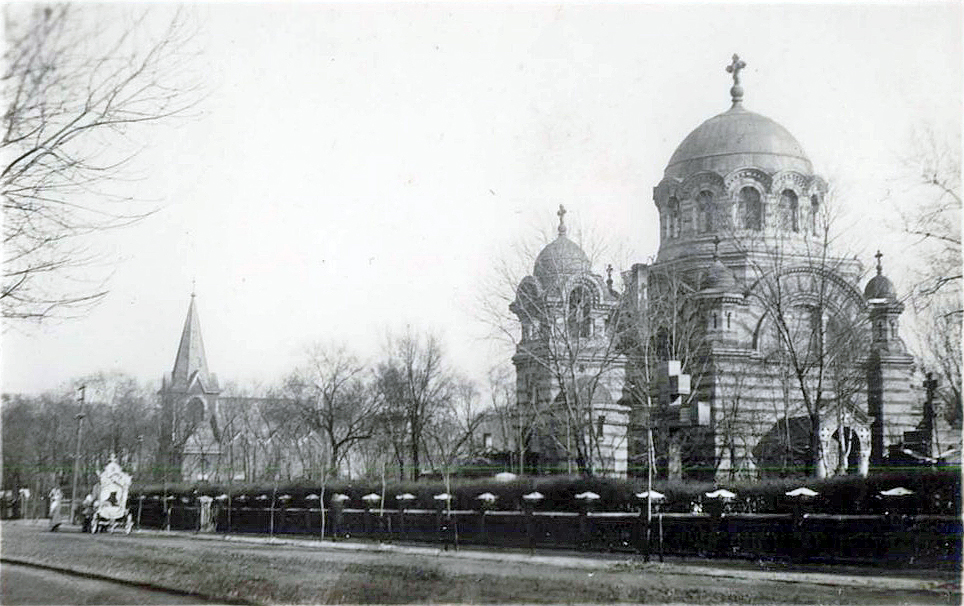
Photo of the church between the years 1920 and 1940

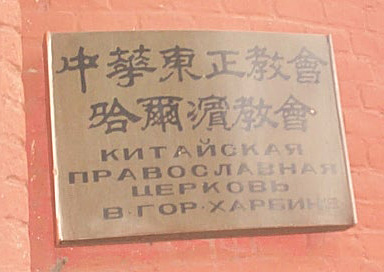
On the Wall of the Church (2002)

The Church of the Intercession, formerly also called the Ukrainian Church in Harbin, is currently the only Orthodox Church in Harbin, and indeed in all of mainland China, open to Chinese nationals for regular worship.

Its summarized history is as follows:

- In 1902, a prayer house was built in the Russian cemetery.
- In 1922, as the China Eastern Railway was being built, the Russians built a wooden church building at the site of current church.
- In 1930, the China Eastern Railway donated the present stone church building. The architect was Tidanov.
- Until 1947, the congregation was composed predominantly of Ukrainians who had fled east from the Russian Revolution in 1917.
- In 1958, during the Great Leap Forward and Cultural Revolution, as the Chinese-Soviet relationship soured, the Russians and Ukrainians left China, forcing discontinuance of the church activities.
- On 14 October [O.S. 1 October] 1984, coinciding with the church's patron saint's feast day, the restoration of the temple was finally completed, and it reopened for worship services, conducted by Father Gregory Zhu, who served at the church from its re-opening until his passing in 2000, leaving the temple without a permanent rector for fifteen years, until the installation of recently-ordained Father Alexander Yu, whose first liturgy was the Orthodox Easter Service on April 18, 2016.
- On 17 May 2024, during his state visit to China, Russian president Vladimir Putin paid visit to, and attended the prayers service in the church in private.

== Services ==
The church is open from 9 to 11am on Sundays and Typica is usually prayed in Chinese at 10am.

== See also ==
- Christianity in China
- Chinese Orthodox Church
- Russian Orthodox Church
- Ukrainian Orthodox Church
- Orthodox Diocese of Harbin and Manchuria
- Saint Sophia Cathedral in Harbin
- Harbin Russians
