= André Sagard =

French missionary (1894 - 1945)

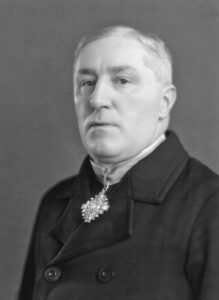
- Archdiocese: Roman Catholic Archdiocese of Shenyang
- Diocese: Roman Catholic Diocese of Jilin
- Elected: 1933
- In office: 1933-1945

Personal details
- Born: August 11, 1849 Ménil-sur-Belvitte, French
- Died: February 11, 1946 (age 96) Changchun, Manchukuo

André Marie Lucien Sagard (August 11, 1849 – February 11, 1946), sometimes known by his Chinese name Sha, was a French missionary who served as Auxiliary Bishop of Apostolic Vicariate of Jilin from 1933 until his death.

He began working as a missionary in Manchuria in 1924 and was awarded the Commander of the Order of the Pillars of the State of Manchukuo from Emperor Puyi for his role negotiating Vatican-Manchukuo relations. Sagard died of typhus during the Russian occupation of Manchukuo on February 11, 1946.
