= Chinese Orthodox Church =

Eastern Orthodox church in China

Coordinates: 39.9443°N 116.4210°E

- 中华东正教会
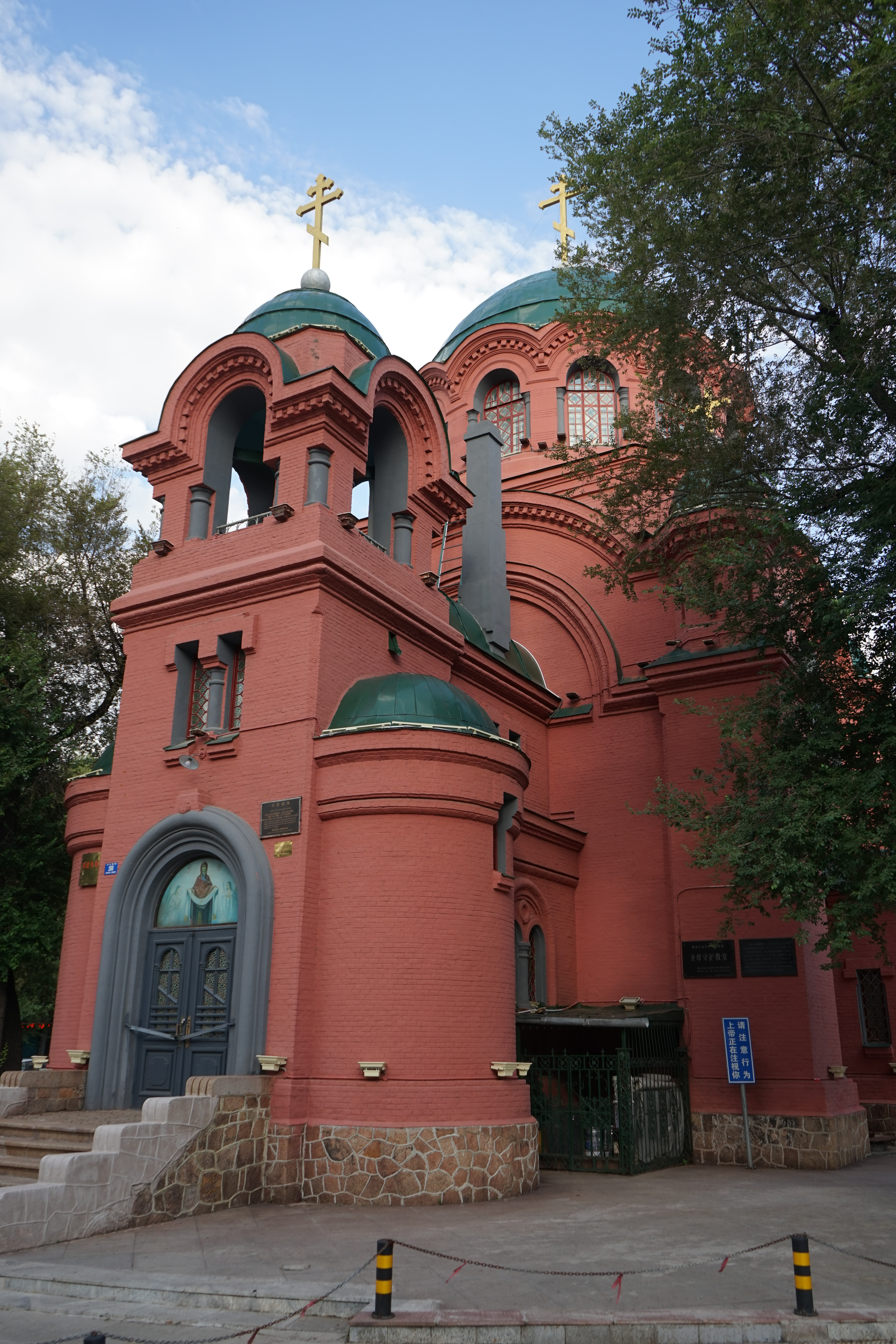
- Church of the Intercession, Harbin
- Abbreviation: COC
- Classification: Eastern Orthodox
- Bishops: 0
- Parishes: 13
- Liturgy: Byzantine Rite
- Territory: People's Republic of China
- Members: 15,000
- Official website: https://orthodoxchina.cn/

The Chinese Orthodox Church (simplified Chinese: 中华东正教会; traditional Chinese: 中華東正教會; pinyin: Zhōnghuá Dōngzhèngjiàohuì, Russian: Китайская православная церковь) is an autonomous Eastern Orthodox Christian church in China. An organized Orthodox presence was maintained in the region as early as the 17th century as a child of the Russian Orthodox Church, which granted the Chinese Church autonomy in 1957 amidst its ongoing suppression in the Soviet Union.

== Earlier forms of Eastern Christianity ==
Christianity is said to have entered China by the apostle Thomas around the year 68 AD, as part of his mission to India. There is also speculative evidence to suggest the missionary of a few Church of the East Assyrian Christians during the Eastern Han Dynasty (25-220AD).

The earliest archeological evidence of Christianity in China, is from the Church of the East in the seventh century. The Eastern Christianity of that period is commemorated by a stele and the Daqin Pagoda of Xi'an. Though it was suppressed in the ninth century, Christianity was reintroduced in the 13th century. It again declined rapidly with the coming of the native Chinese Ming dynasty in the 14th century.

== Russian Orthodox mission ==
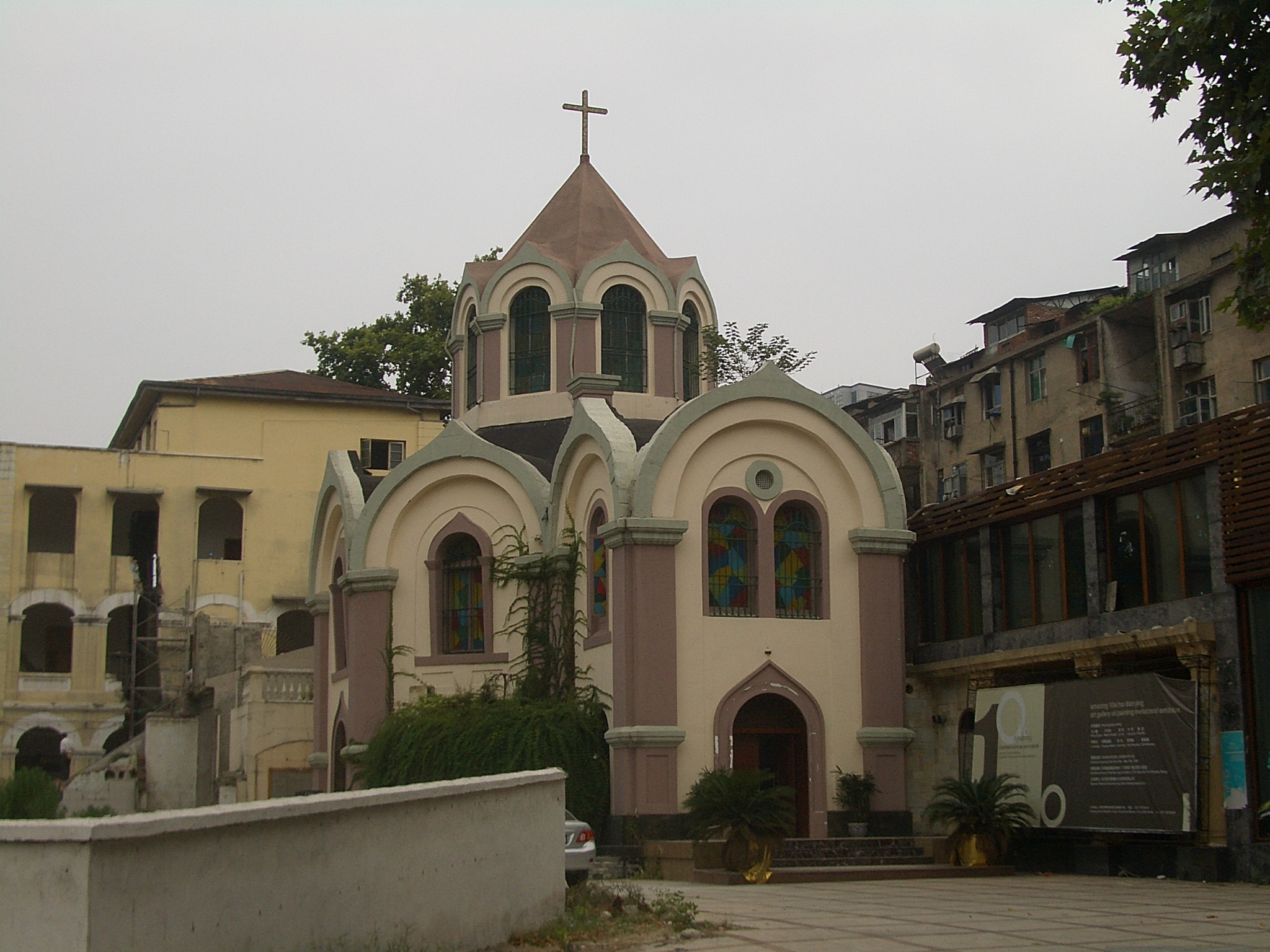
Former Orthodox church in Wuhan

The religious and missionary spirit of the Russian Orthodox church towards China was considerably minimal and was often a low priority compared to strategic, political, and diplomatic interests.

During the 1680s, Siberian Cossacks along with a few Orthodox clerics, created a settlement at Albazin on the Amur River. The Kangxi Emperor considered Albazin within Qing territory so he set out a force of 10,000 troops to assault the Russian garrison there. Most of the Cossacks retreated back to Siberia while 30 joined the Qing army.

After the Treaty of Nerchinsk of 1689, along with other concessions, a biannual Russian caravan was allowed to enter Beijing for trade. These trade caravans would soon lead to it being closely knit with the ecclesiastical Russian mission. The mission was at first meant to cater to the Albazinians in Beijing. In the late 1690s, Peter the Great saw Russian trade in Beijing as a potential method to press for Russian interests in China so he sent an Archimandrite priest to China. He also requested that priest and clerics be trained as missionaries and ordered the Metropolite of Kiev to dispatch two or three monks along with a priest to Beijing so that they could learn Chinese. A Russian-Chinese negotiation in 1713 brought the first archimandrite priests to Beijing to cater to Russian merchants and the Albazinians.

The first mission establishment was begun in 1715 at Beijing by an Orthodox archimandrite, Hilarion. This mission is first recorded in the Russo-Chinese Treaty of Kyakhta (1727). Under Sava Vladislavich's pressure, the Chinese government conceded to the Russians the right to build an Orthodox chapel at the ambassadorial quarters of Beijing. The mission published four volumes of research in Chinese studies in the 1850s and 1860s. Two clerics became well known for scholarship in the subject, the monk Iakinf and Archimandrite Palladius, who also compiled a dictionary.

=== Boxer Rebellion ===
The Boxer Rebellion of 1898–1900 targeted foreign missionaries and Chinese converts to Christianity. The mission suffered greatly, and the Boxers burned the mission's library in Beijing.

The Orthodox liturgical calendar for June 24 remembers 222 Chinese Orthodox Christians, including Father Mitrophan, who were slaughtered in 1900, as the Holy Martyrs of China.

In spite of the uprising, by 1902, there were 32 Orthodox churches in China with close to 6,000 adherents. The church also ran schools and orphanages.

=== Leaders of the Russian mission ===
- Father Maxim Leontieff, 1685–1712.
- Archimandrite Hilarion (Lezhaysky), 1715–1728.
- Archimandrite Anthony (Platkovsky), 1729–1735.
- Archimandrite Hilarion (Trusov), 1736–1743.
- Archimandrite Gervasius (Lentsovsky), 1744–1755
- Archimandrite Ambrose (Yumatoff), 1755–1771
- Archimandrite Nicholas (Tsvet), 1771–1781
- Archimandrite Joachim (Shishkovsky), 1781–1794
- Archimandrite Sophronius (Gribovsky), 1794–1807
- Archimandrite Hyacinth (Bichurin), 1806–1821
- Archimandrite Peter (Kamensky), 1821–1830
- Archimandrite Benjamin (Morachevich), 1830–1840
- Archimandrite Polycarp (Tougarinoff), 1840–1849
- Archimandrite Palladius (Kafarov), 1849–1859 and 1864–1878
- Archimandrite Gurias (Karpoff), 1858–1864
- Archimandrite Flavian (Gorodetsky), 1878–1884
- Archimandrite Amphilochius (Loutovinoff), 1883–1896
- Metropolitan Innocent (Figourovsky). Archimandrite 1897–1901, Bishop of Beijing 1902–1921, Archbishop of Beijing and All-China 1922–1928, Metropolitan 1928–1931
- Archbishop Simon (Vinogradov), 1928–1933
- Archbishop Victor (Svjatin), 1933–1956

== Chinese Orthodox Church ==
With the establishment of the People's Republic of China in 1949, Archbishop Victor set out ambitious plans to continue the work of the Russian mission and Russian leadership, through the expansion of evangelization operations and the creation of new seminaries. Instead, the Moscow Patriarchate ordered Victor to speed up transition the mission into a Chinese church within ten years. However, in the 1950s, resources were stripped as Russia and China were involved in the Korean War, and China saw an exodus of Russian expatriates. The Moscow Patriarchate formally granted autonomy in 1957 to the Chinese Orthodox Church, but transferred mission properties to the Russian and Chinese governments. While now run by Chinese clergy, the eventual Anti-Rightist Campaign posed a difficult time for all Christians, Orthodox or otherwise, and all public religious activity came to an end by the Cultural Revolution in 1966.

== Today ==
Since the 1980s, the government of the People's Republic of China extends official recognition to five religious communities: Buddhism, Taoism, Islam, Catholicism (through the Catholic Patriotic Association) and Protestantism (through the Three-Self Patriotic Movement). However, this recognition has not been extended to the Orthodox Church. Nonetheless, in the 2010s tentative steps have been taken between China and Russia to revive the Chinese Orthodox Church.

At present, there are only three communities in mainland China with regular weekly services and resident clergy. The Beijing community meets at the restored Church of the Dormition in the grounds of the Russian Embassy in Dongzhimen; the Shanghai community at the Russian Consulate; and the Church of the Intercession, Harbin, the only one open to Chinese nationals for regular worship. Elsewhere, priestless congregations continue to meet in Northeast China (in Heilongjiang and elsewhere) and in Western China (Xinjiang – Ürümqi and Ghulja) with, apparently, the tacit consent of the government. There are also Orthodox parishes in the province of Guangdong and in Shanghai; two former Orthodox churches in Shanghai are currently in a process of being returned to the church but no activities are currently held inside them.

In March 2018, the Chinese Orthodox church acquired the government's approval to prepare new priests in Russian theological seminaries.

The Orthodox Church operates relatively freely in Hong Kong, where there are two parishes: Saint Luke Greek Orthodox Cathedral (Eastern Orthodox Metropolitanate of Hong Kong and Southeast Asia under the Ecumenical Patriarchate) and the Russian Orthodox parish of Saints Peter and Paul under the Moscow Patriarchate. There is also a presence in Taiwan (where Archimandrite Jonah George Mourtos leads a mission church).

== Orthodox Evenkis ==
Although many of them have adopted Tibetan Buddhism, the Evenks of both the Russian Federation and China are Orthodox Christian people. They are one of the Asiatic peoples who practice Orthodox Christianity, which they voluntarily adopted. There are also around 3000 Evenks in neighbouring Heilongjiang.

== See also ==
- Christianity in China
  - Timeline of Orthodoxy in China
  - Catholic Church in China
  - Protestantism in China
- Albazinians
- Oros Niru
- Amur Cossacks
- Harbin Russians
- Orthodox Diocese of Harbin and Manchuria
- Chinese characters for transcribing Slavonic
