= Sacred Heart of Jesus Cathedral, Harbin =

Church building in Harbin, China

Coordinates: 45°45′43″N 126°38′38″E

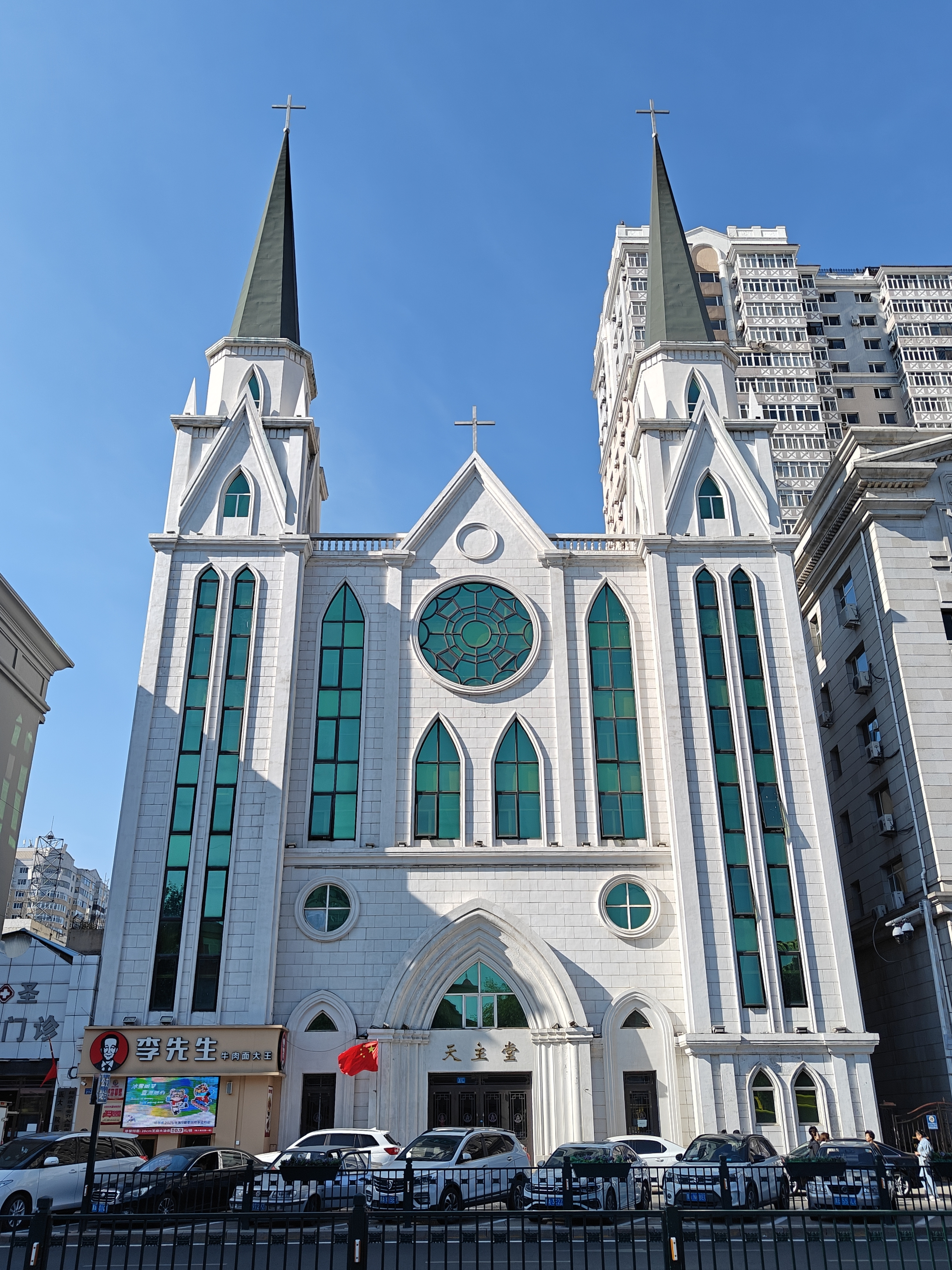
Sacred Heart Cathedral of Harbin (re-built in 2004)

The Cathedral of the Sacred Heart of Jesus (in Chinese: 哈尔滨圣心天主教堂) is a Roman Catholic church in Harbin, Heilongjiang Province, China. Its official name is Sacred Heart of Jesus Diocesan Cathedral of Harbin.

== General ==
=== Under construction ===
Sacred Heart Cathedral of Harbin is a Roman Catholic church in Harbin, Heilongjiang Province, China.

The church's history can be summarized as follows:

- ca. 1900, while China Eastern Railway being built, many Polish people came to Harbin to work. The greater majority of them were Catholics.
- 1906 - The cornerstone was set by the priest Dominik Przyłuski and the construction of a Catholic church began. It was completed and dedicated in the following year. The church was also called Polish Catholic Church or East Dazhi Avenue Catholic Church
- Thereafter, the church came under St. Petersburg, Vladivostok, Beijing and Jilin Dioceses
- 1959 - The church became the diocesan cathedral of Heilongjiang Diocese
- 1966 - During the Cultural Revolution, the church building was abolished
- 2004 - The church building was re-built

The address of the church is: No. 211, East Dazhi Avenue, Nangang District, Harbin. Phone: 0451-5365-3007. The church is located in the "church street", north east of "Hongbo Square' (where Czar Nicolas' Central Church was), on East Dazhi Avenue, where there are also Harbin Nangang Christian Church (Protestant) and Church of the Intercession in Harbin (Eastern Orthodox).

== See also ==
- Christianity and Catholicism
- Christianity in China
- Roman Catholicism in China
- Chinese Patriotic Catholic Association
- List of Catholic cathedrals in China
- Some Christian churches in Northeast China:

Catholic: Dalian Catholic Church, Sacred Heart Cathedral of Shenyang, St. Theresa's Cathedral of Changchun, Sacred Heart Cathedral of Harbin, etc.; Protestant: Dalian Yuguang Street Church, Shenyang Dongguan Church, Changchun Christian Church, Harbin Nangang Christian Church, etc.; and Eastern Orthodox: Church of the Intercession in Harbin, etc.
