= Harbin Nangang Christian Church =

Church in Harbin, Heilongjian, China

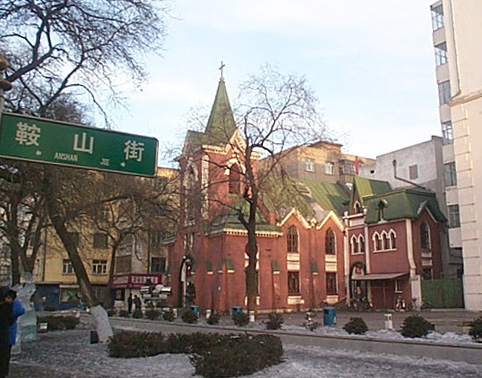
Harbin Nangang Christian Church - Front View (2002)

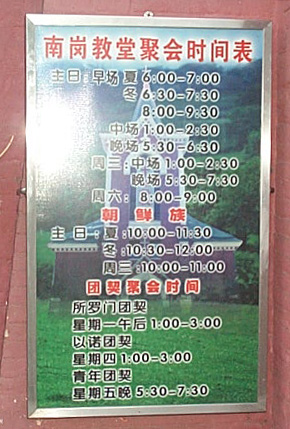
Harbin Nangang Christian Church - Activities (2002)

Harbin Nangang Christian Church (simplified Chinese: 哈尔滨南岗基督教会; traditional Chinese: 哈爾濱南崗基督教會) is a Protestant (formerly Lutheran) church in Harbin, Heilongjiang Province, China. The current building was built in 1916 and is located in Church Street, along East Dazhi Avenue, northeast of Hongbo Square. Its address is: No. 252, East Dazhi Avenue, Nangang District, Harbin. The church is next to the Eastern Orthodox Church of the Intercession and is almost identical in color to the Orthodox church beside it, with the same red walls and green roofs.

== Brief history ==
- 1901 - As the construction of the Chinese Eastern Railway started, some Germans came to Harbin, for whom a Baptist church was built nearby, which was the first Protestant church in Harbin
- 1914 - A Lutheran church was built
- 1916 - The Lutheran church was re-built and known as Ni-ai-la-yi Church (尼埃拉依教堂)
- 1967 - Closed during the Cultural Revolution
- 1980 - Re-opened for worship

== Activities ==
The Nangang Christian Church holds a Chinese-language service and as of 2002, an ethnic Korean service. As of 2017, the church hosted an English fellowship with a mixed congregation of Chinese nationals and overseas citizens. The Sunday morning English service is held from 10:20 - 11:30 AM.

== See also ==
- Dalian Lutheran Church
- Holy Cross Church, Wanzhou
- Lutheran Church of China
