= Romanization of Korean =

Writing Korean using the Latin script

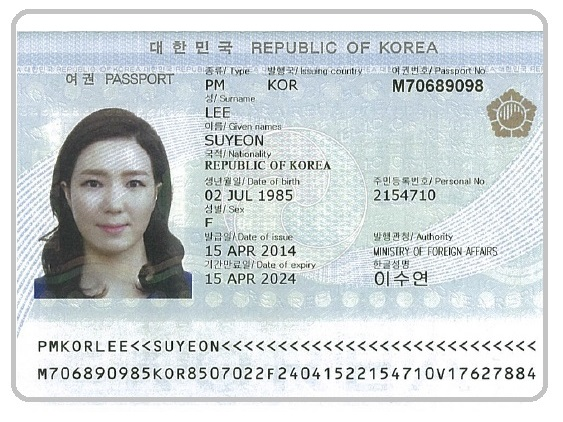
A specimen of the identity information page of a South Korean passport, displaying the romanization of the bearer's name (Lee Suyeon) for international legibility.

The romanization of Korean is the use of the Latin script to transcribe the Korean language.

There are multiple romanization systems in common use. The two most prominent systems are McCune–Reischauer (MR) and Revised Romanization (RR). MR is almost universally used in Western academic Korean studies, and a variant of it has been the official system of North Korea since 1992. RR is the official system of South Korea and has been in use since 2000.

The earliest romanization systems for Korean emerged around the mid-19th century. Due to a number of factors, including the properties of the Korean language and alphabet, as well as social and geopolitical issues, a single settled standard did not emerge. By 1934, there were 27 extant romanization systems, and by 1997, there were over 40.

== Major systems ==
The following systems are currently the most widely used:

- McCune–Reischauer ("MR"; 1939): Basis for various romanization systems. Almost universally used by international academic journals on Korean studies.
  - Romanization of Korean (1992): The official romanization in North Korea, with some differences from the original MR.
  - ALA-LC romanization for Korean, first published in 1997 and revised in 2009, is a modification of MR made for use in libraries. It was developed by the American Library Association (ALA) and Library of Congress (LC).
- Revised Romanization of Korean ("RR"; 2000): South Korea's official romanization system.
- Yale romanization of Korean (1942): Standard for almost exclusively international linguists.

== History ==
Philipp Franz von Siebold's first romanization system for Korean, published 1832

The earliest known romanization system for Korean was devised in 1832 by the German physician Philipp Franz von Siebold, while he was living in Japan. Another early romanization system was an 1835 unnamed and unpublished system by missionary Walter Henry Medhurst, used in his translation of a comparative book on the Chinese, Korean, and Japanese languages. (Note: English title of work was Translation of a comparative Vocabulary of the Chinese, Corean and Japanese, to Which is Added the thousand Character Classic, in Chinese and Corean, the Whole Accompanied by Copious Indexes of All the Chinese and English Words Occurring in the Work. It was a translation of an 18th-century text by the Joseon government agency Bureau of Interpreters. Holstein claims this is the first romanization system, but Fouser provides an earlier example.) Medhurst's romanization scheme was not significantly used. In 1874, the Dallet system was introduced; it was based on French phonology. It was the first to use the digraphs eo and eu, and the first to use diacritics for Korean romanization; it used the grave and acute accents over the letter "e". The first system to achieve significant usage was the Ross system, named for John Ross, which was designed in 1877. (Note: Holstein gives the wrong date; he is referring to the publication of Ross's 1877 book Corean Primer, which contains the romanization system.) It saw adoption by missionaries.

In 1897, James Scarth Gale introduced his system in his work A Korean-English Dictionary. This system achieved limited adoption; it was reportedly adopted by the Harvard Journal of Asiatic Studies. Despite this, some scholars criticized these early systems. More systems by Westerners emerged, based on English, French, and German phonology. Japanese scholars also developed their own romanizations for Korean, many of which were built on the work of Siebold and Dallet. In 1935, Jeong In-seop published The International Phonetic Transcription of Korean Speech Sounds.

Systems continued to be developed to address shortcomings in other systems. By 1934, according to Japanese linguist Shinpei Ogura's count, there were at least 27 extant systems. Whereas Hepburn romanization had already become the widely accepted standard for the romanization of Japanese by the 1930s, Korean continued to lack such a standard. This led to significant diversity and inconsistency in romanization, not only between scholars but even within the works of individual authors.

=== Challenges for developing a standard romanization ===
The task of developing a standard romanization scheme for Korean was complicated by a number of factors.

Even into the 20th century, there were significant variations in the pronunciation and spelling of the Korean language and Hangul respectively, often due to the dialects of Korean. Attempts were made to standardize the Korean language, but these efforts were made by multiple authorities. Two rivaling societies for standardizing Korean emerged: the Korean Language Society (조선어학회) and the Chŏson Ŏhak Yŏn'guhoe (조선어학연구회); they published separate guidances. Eventually, the Korean Language Society's standard became the basis for the standards of both North and South Korea. Other references for spelling included those used in Gale's dictionary, guidances from the Government-General of Chōsen, and a French dictionary.

Other challenges were fundamental to properties of the Korean language and script, which make the language difficult to map onto the Latin script. McCune and Reischauer claimed in 1939 that there are eight to ten vowels in Korean (this topic was still debated by that point). As there are only five vowels in the Latin script, the other vowel sounds had to be rendered either using multiple letters in the form of digraphs (e.g. eo for ㅓ) or by using diacritics. Also, in many cases, pronunciation does not exactly match what is written in Hangul; similar phenomena occurs with all other major scripts as well. For example, due to linguistic assimilation, the state Silla is written in Korean as 신라 (sin-la), but pronounced sil-la.

Some challenges were social and geopolitical. Early scholars often wrote about Korea from Sinocentric or Japanese perspectives; Korean place names were often rendered using pronunciations from Chinese or Japanese. Furthermore, after Korea went under Japanese rule, the official names of many places were treated as Japanese language names. In addition, the Japanese colonial government implemented various restrictions on the use of the Korean language around the mid-1930s; the Korean Language Society was also persecuted in one incident.

Regardless of romanization systems, many Koreans chose and continue to choose to spell their names in Latin script in an ad hoc manner. For example, 이/리 (李) is variously romanized as Lee, Yi, I, or Rhee. In some cases, single families romanized their surnames differently on South Korean passports. For example, within a single 심 family, a father's surname was rendered as "Shim" and the son's as "Sim".

=== McCune–Reischauer ===
McCune–Reischauer (MR) is a system that was first introduced in 1939, in the journal Transactions of the Royal Asiatic Society Korea Branch. It is named for George M. McCune and Edwin O. Reischauer; the two developed the system together in consultation with Korean linguists Choe Hyeon-bae, Jeong In-seop, and Kim Seon-gi.

The system has proved controversial with especially native Korean speakers. It was developed mainly for use in Western academia, and reflected pronunciation rules that many Koreans were not consciously aware of, as they are not reflected in Hangul. Linguist Robert J. Fouser argued that another point of contention was nationalism; some disliked that the system had been developed by foreigners during the Japanese colonial period, and wanted a natively developed alternative.

=== After the liberation and division of Korea ===
In 1945, Korea was liberated, as well as divided. Both Koreas began to develop separate language standards. South Korea adopted MR in 1948. According to Reischauer, McCune "persuaded the American Army Map Service to adopt [the McCune–Reischauer system], and through the Korean War it became the foundation for most current Romanizations of Korean place names". After the 1950–1953 Korean War, romanization was seen as a minor concern, compared to improving domestic literacy in Hangul. Meanwhile, romanization systems continued to emerge; by 1997, there were more than 40 romanization systems.

In 1956, North Korea published its new official romanization system. This system combines features of the Dallet and 1933 Unified Orthography. It was revised in 1986.

In 1959, the South Korean Ministry of Education published a romanization system, which has since been dubbed the Ministry of Education system (MOE). The system received immediate backlash, mainly from foreigners. Fouser evaluated the system as prioritizing use for Koreans; it had a one-to-one correspondence from Hangul to Latin script, and did not account for the pronunciation changes that Hangul did not reflect. The system also tended to produce romanizations that bore superficial resemblance to English words, some of which were seen as odd or humorous, such as Dogribmun (Korean: 독립문; RR: Dongnimmun; MR: Tongnimmun), which evokes the ribs of dogs. The Ministry of Education met in 1978 and 1979 and drafted several alterations, although these did not come to pass allegedly because of political turmoil around that time. Eventually, the South Korean government began considering a more foreigner-friendly system in anticipation of the 1988 Summer Olympics in Seoul. Various attempts were made to measure objective and subjective metrics of the various systems, for example how frequently systems deviated from expected pronunciation or which systems produced the most accurate pronunciations by foreigners. In 1984, a slightly modified version of McCune–Reischauer was adopted, amid pushback from Koreans.

In 1968, Samuel E. Martin introduced a system that has since been called the Yale system. The system became widely used in the international academic linguistics community, although few others adopted it. Fouser argues that while the system allowed for reversibility, it is "unsightly", suited to those who already know Hangul, and does not adequately communicate pronunciation, even in comparison to the MOE system.

==== Computer age ====
With the spread of computers and the Internet by the 1980s and 1990s, complaints about MR grew. The breves used in MR are not easily accessible on a standard keyboard. Some took to replacing the breve with alternate characters or simply omitting it altogether; the diversity of practice and ambiguity if breves were not used led to confusion. In 1986, the International Organization for Standardization (ISO) requested both North and South Korea to work together on developing a standard romanization. The two countries held a series of meetings, during which they failed to reach a consensus.

Some created new systems and others proposed reverting to previous ones. In 1991, the South Korean National Academy of the Korean Language (NAKL; 국립국어연구원) proposed its own new system. Concurrently, Bok Moon Kim produced his own romanization system. Despite Kim's advocacy for his system, it never saw adoption; some of the romanizations it produced (e.g. "Dongnipmoon") were mocked in the press as humorous. In 1997, the South Korean government began moving to revise or switch romanization systems. The topic was hotly debated in South Korean press and foreigner communities. One concern was the estimated expenses needed to repaint all road signs with new romanizations.

In 1997, the National Academy of the Korean Language System was jointly proposed by the National Commission of Romanization of Korean and the Academy of Korean Language. The system is transliteration based; journalist Choe Yong-shik of The Korea Times alleged that it was designed without the input of non-Koreans and mostly intended for ease of use for Koreans. Under that system, Tongnimmun is rendered Dogribmun.

=== Revised Romanization of Korean ===
On July 7, 2000, the NAKL and Ministry of Culture and Tourism announced that South Korea would adopt a new system: Revised Romanization (RR). Road signs and textbooks were required to follow these rules as soon as possible, at an estimated cost of US$500–600 million.

In a 2020 book, linguists Sungdai Cho and John Whitman argued that RR's lack of diacritics has "helped it gain widespread acceptance on the Internet".

== Romanization systems of the Soviet Union ==
In the late 1920s to 1930s, the Soviet Latinization movement, which sought to standardize the use of Latin script variants across the Soviet Union, attempted to supplant Hangul as the primary script for Korean. Koreans publicly debated whether to Latinize (i.e. use a Latin script in place of Hangul), with some publishing articles in the newspaper Sŏnbong. According to a 1931 article by B. K. Pashkov, a 1930 meeting by Korean members of the Communist Party and Komsomol in Vladivostok concluded with a resolution to Latinize as soon as possible. Meanwhile, Russian scholars and bureaucrats also began proposing the same.

The below plans were debated, with alternatives proposed, including ones by Kim Naksŏn (김낙선) and Pak Yŏngbin (박영빈). Overall, such proposals were never successful, and poorly received by Koreans. By around 1934, the overall Soviet Latinization movement began to decline.

=== Primorsky Committee romanization ===
The first Soviet romanization scheme was the Primorsky (Maritime) Committee romanization scheme, which was published in November 1931 by the Primorsky Committee based in Khabarovsk. Its Korean name was given as Rat'enhwahan Koryŏ kŭlcha ch'oan (라텐화한고려글자초안).

Latin	a	b	c	d	e	f	g	h	i	j	k	l	m	n	ng	o	p	r	s	t	u	j	v	w	x	y	z	ch	kh	th	ph
Hangul	ㅏ	ㅂ	ㅉ	ㄷ	ㅓ	ㅍ	ㄱ	ㅎ	ㅣ	ㅣ	ㄱ	ㄹㄹ	ㅁ	ㄴ	ㅇ	ㅗ	ㅃ	ㄹ	ㅅ	ㄸ	ㅜ	ㅡ	ㅂ	ㅜ	ㅆ	ㅣ	ㅈ	ㅊ	ㅋ	ㅌ	ㅍ

J and w are semivowels used before vowels to make diphthongs (e.g. ja for ㅑ and wy for ㅟ). Y is a short vowel used after vowels to make diphthongs (e.g. oy for ㅚ and йy for ㅢ). An apostrophe (') is used to prevent occurrences of ng that are not meant to represent ㅇ from being read this way, for example chen'ge for 천거 (distinguishing it from 청어).

=== Moscow romanization ===
The Moscow romanization scheme was published around the same time as the Maritime Committee scheme in 1931.

Latin	A	ə	B	C	Ch	D	E	ь	G	H	I	J	K	Kh	L	M	N	O	Ø	P	Ph	R	S	Sh	T	Th	U	W	Y	Z	n
Hangul	ㅏ	ㅐ	ㅂ	ㅉ	ㅊ	ㄷ	ㅔ	ㅓ	ㄱ	ㅎ	ㅣ	ㅣ	ㄲ	ㅋ	ㄹㄹ	ㅁ	ㄴ	ㅗ	ㅚ	ㅃ	ㅍ	ㄹ	ㅆ	ㅅ	ㄸ	ㅌ	ㅜ	ㅜ	ㅣ	ㅈ	ㅇ

While some diphthongs are represented by single symbols (e.g. Ø for ㅚ), others are represented by joining the semi-vowels j and w to other vowels (e.g. jь for ㅕ and wj for ㅟ).

=== O Sŏngmuk romanization ===
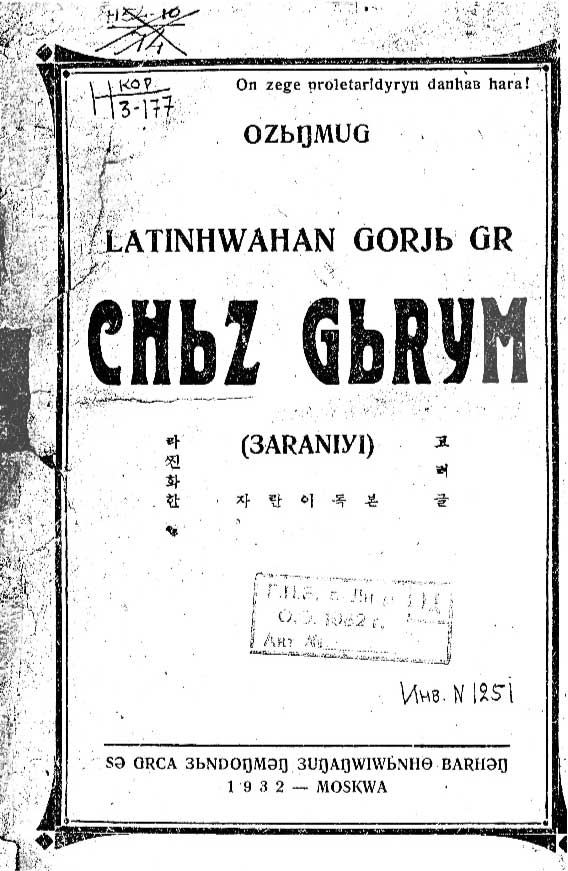

Koryo-saram O Sŏngmuk (오성묵; 吳成默) devised his own romanization system, which is attested in a surviving 1932 publication entitled First Steps in Latinized Korean (라ᄶᅵᆫ화한 고려글 자란이독본; Latinizirovannyi Koreiskii Bukvar’). The system used Soviet I with bowl and imported ɜ from Cyrillic.

Vowels: a ㅏ, e ㅔ, ə ㅐ, i ㅣ, o ㅗ, ɵ ㅚ, u ㅜ, y ㅡ, ь ㅓ
Semi-vowels: j, w
Consonants: ʙ ㅂ, c ㅉ, d ㄷ, g ㄱ, h ㅎ, k ㄲ, l ㄹㄹ, m ㅁ, n ㄴ, ŋ -ㅇ, p ㅃ, r ㄹ, s ㅆ, t ㄸ, z ㅅ, ɜ ㅈ.

For example, 온 세게 프롤레따리들은 단합하라! was rendered as On zege proletaridyryn danhaʙ hara! and 새 글짜 전동맹 중앙위원회 발행 was rendered as Sə grca ɜьndoŋməŋ zuŋaŋwiwьnhɵ barhəŋ.

O's proposal was approved and published by the All-Union Central Committee for the New Alphabet, in Moscow. However, it was likely rejected at some point afterwards.

=== Kholodovich romanization ===
Aleksandr Kholodovich proposed the following romanization scheme in 1935:

Latin	a	ʙ	d	e	æ	g	h	i	y	k	kh	l	r	m	n	ng	o	ө	ə	p	ph	s	t	th	u	z
Hangul	ㅏ	ㅂ	ㄷ	ㅔ	ㅐ	ㄱ	ㅎ	ㅣ	ㅡ	ㄲ	ㅋ	ㄹㄹ	ㄹ	ㅁ	ㄴ	ㅇ	ㅗ	ㅚ	ㅓ	ㅃ	ㅍ	ㅆ	ㄸ	ㅌ	ㅜ	ㅅ

== List of romanization systems ==
- Siebold romanization (1832)
- Medhurst romanization (1835)
- Dallet system (1874)
- Félix-Clair Ridel dictionary (1880)
- Ross system (1882)
- Gale system (1897)
- Eckardt system (1923)
- Primorsky (Maritime) Committee romanization (1931)
- Moscow romanization (1931)
- O Sŏngmuk romanization (1932)
- Unified Han'gŭl Orthography System appendix (1933)
- Ogura system (1934)
- Jung romanization (1935 or 1936)
- Kholodovich romanization (1935)
- McCune–Reischauer (1939)
  - ALA-LC romanization
  - Ministry of Education system ("MOE-1984"; 1984)
- Lukoff romanization (1945), developed by Fred Lukoff
- Yale romanization of Korean (1950s)
- Ministry of Education system ("MOE-1959"; 1959)
- Korean Language Society ("KLS-1984"; 1984)
- The Shibu Shohei System (1990)
- Korean Romanization for Data Application (1992)
- You Mahn-gun's System (1992)
- Korean romanization of INALCO (1992)
- Lee Hyun Bok's Computer-Communication System (1994)
- Bok Moon Kim romanization (1996)
- HanSe System (1996)
- ISO/TR 11941 (1996): This actually is two different standards under one name: one for North Korea (DPRK) and the other for South Korea (ROK). The initial submission to the ISO was based heavily on Yale and was a joint effort between both states, but they could not agree on the final draft. Linguists Sungdai Cho and John Whitman claimed the system was never adopted by any organization or state and never saw significant use.
- National Academy of the Korean Language System (1997)
- Revised Romanization of Korean (2000)

== Comparison of various systems ==
Comparison of romanization of consonants
Hangul	IPA	RR	MR	Yale	DPRK	USSR	Shibu	Han	Lukoff	Mahn-gun
ㅁ	/m/	m	m	m	m	m	m	m	m	m
ㅂ	/p/	b/p (Note: The first alternative is used before a vowel; the second is used elsewhere.)	p/b	p	p	b	b	b	p	b
ㅃ	/p͈/	pp	pp	pp	pp	p	bb	bb	pp	p
ㅍ	/pʰ/	p	p'	ph	ph	ph	p	p	ph	ph
ㄴ	/n/	n	n	n	n	n	n	n	n	n
ㄷ	/t/	d/t	t/d	t	t	d	d	d	t	d
ㄸ	/t͈/	tt	tt	tt	tt	t	dd	dd	tt	t
ㅌ	/tʰ/	t	t'	th	th	th	t	t	th	th
ㄹ	/l/ [l]~[ɾ]	r/l	r/l	l	r	r	r	l	l	l/r
ㅅ	/s/	s	s	s	s	z	s	s	s	s
ㅆ	/s͈/	ss	ss	ss	ss	s	ss	ss	ss	ss
ㅈ	/t͡ɕ/~/t͡s/	j	ch/j	c	ts	з	j	z	j	j
ㅉ	/t͈͡ɕ/~/t͈͡s/	jj	tch	cc	tss	c	jj	zz	jj	cz
ㅊ	/t͡ɕʰ/~/t͡sʰ/	ch	ch'	ch	tsh	ch	c	c	jh	ch
ㄱ	/k/	g/k	k/g	k	k	g	g	g	k	g
ㄲ	/k͈/	kk	kk	kk	kk	k	gg	gg	kk	k
ㅋ	/kʰ/	k	k'	kh	kh	kh	k	k	kh	kh
ㅎ	/h/	h	h	h	h	h	h	h	h	h
ㅇ	silent / /ŋ/ (Note: Nothing in syllable-initial position, ng syllable-finally.)	-/ng	-/ng	-/ng	-/ng	ŋ	'/q	g	ng	ng

Comparison of romanization of vowels
Hangul	IPA	RR	MR	Yale	DPRK	USSR	Shibu	Han	Lukoff	Mahn-gun
ㅏ	/a/	a	a	a	a	a	a	a	a	a
ㅓ	/ʌ/	eo	ŏ	e	ŏ	ь	e	e	ø	au
ㅗ	/o/	o	o	(w)o	o	o	o	o	o	o
ㅜ	/u/	u	u	wu	u	u	u	u	u	ou
ㅡ	/ɯ/ [ɯ]~[ɨ]	eu	ŭ	u	ŭ	y	y	w	ʉ	u
ㅣ	/i/	i	i	i	i	i	i	i	i	i/y
ㅐ	/ɛ/	ae	ae	ay	ae	ə	ai	ae	ä	ai
ㅔ	/e/	e	e	ey	e	e	ei	é	e	e
ㅚ	/ø/ [ø]~[we]	oe	oe	(w)oy	oe	ø	oi	ó	ö	we
ㅟ	/y/ [y]~[ɥi]	wi	wi	wi	we	ui	ui	uj	wi	wi
ㅢ	/ɰi/ [ɰi]~[ɨ̯i]~[i]	ui	ŭi	uy	ŭi	yi	yi	wj	ʉ	ui
ㅑ	/ja/	ya	ya	ya	ya	ja	ia	ja	ya	ya
ㅕ	/jʌ/	yeo	yŏ	ye	yŏ	jь	ie	je	yø	yau
ㅛ	/jo/	yo	yo	yo	yo	jo	io	jo	yo	yo
ㅠ	/ju/	yu	yu	yu	yu	ju	iu	ju	yu	you
ㅒ	/jɛ/	yae	yae	yay	yae	jə	iai	jae	yä	yai
ㅖ	/je/	ye	ye	yey	ye	je	iei	jé	ye	ye
ㅘ	/wa/	wa	wa	wa	wa	wa	oa	ōa	wa	wa
ㅝ	/wʌ/	wo	wŏ	we	wŏ	wь	ue	ōe	wø	wau
ㅙ	/wɛ/	wae	wae	way	wae	wə	oai	óae	wä	wai
ㅞ	/we/	we	we	wey	we	we	uei	ōé	we	we

== Examples ==
English	Hangul	IPA	RR (RR transliteration in brackets)	MR	Yale
wall	벽	[pjʌk̚]	byeok (byeog)	pyŏk	pyek
on the wall	벽에	[pjʌ.ɡe̞]	byeoge (byeog-e)	pyŏge	pyek ey
outside (uninflected)	밖	[pak̚]	bak (bakk)	pak	pakk
outside	밖에	[pa.k͈e̞]	bakke (bakk-e)	pakke	pakk ey
kitchen	부엌	[pu.ʌk̚]	bueok (bueok)	puŏk	puekh
to/in the kitchen	부엌에	[pu.ʌ.kʰe̞]	bueoke (bueok-e)	puŏk'e	puekh ey
Wikipedia	위키백과	[yk.çi.be̞k̚.k͈wa̠]	wikibaekgwa (wikibaeggwa)	wikibaekkwa	wikhi payk.kwa
Hangul	한글	[han.ɡɯl]	hangeul or han-geul (hangeul)	han'gŭl	hānkul
character, letter	글자	[kɯl.t͈ɕa]	geulja (geulja)	kŭlcha	kulqca
(an) easy (+ noun)	쉬운	[ɕɥi.un]	swiun (swiun)	shwiun	swīwun
Korea has four distinct seasons.	한국은 네 계절이 뚜렷하다.	[han.ɡu.ɡɯn ne̞ kje̞.dʑʌ.ɾi t͈u.ɾjʌ.tʰa.da]	Hangugeun ne gyejeori tturyeotada. (Hangug-eun ne gyejeol-i ttulyeoshada.)	Han'gugŭn ne kyejŏri tturyŏthada.	Hānkwuk un nēy kyēycel i ttwulyes hata.
Just check the line color and width you want.	원하시는 선 색깔과 굵기에 체크하시면 됩니다.	[wʌn.ɦa.ɕi.nɯn sʌn sɛ̝k̚.k͈al.ɡwa kul.k͈i.e̞ tɕʰe̞.k͡xɯ.ɦa.ɕi.mjʌn twe̞m.ɲi.da]	Wonhasineun seon saekkkalgwa gulkkie chekeuhasimyeon doemnida. (Wonhasineun seon saegkkalgwa gulggie chekeuhasimyeon doebnida.)	Wŏnhasinŭn sŏn saekkalgwa kulkie ch'ek'ŭhasimyŏn toemnida.	Wēn hasinun sen sayk.kkal kwa kwulk.ki ey cheykhu hasimyen toypnita.

== See also ==
- Cyrillization of Korean
