= Zhonghelu Church =

Church in Fushun, China

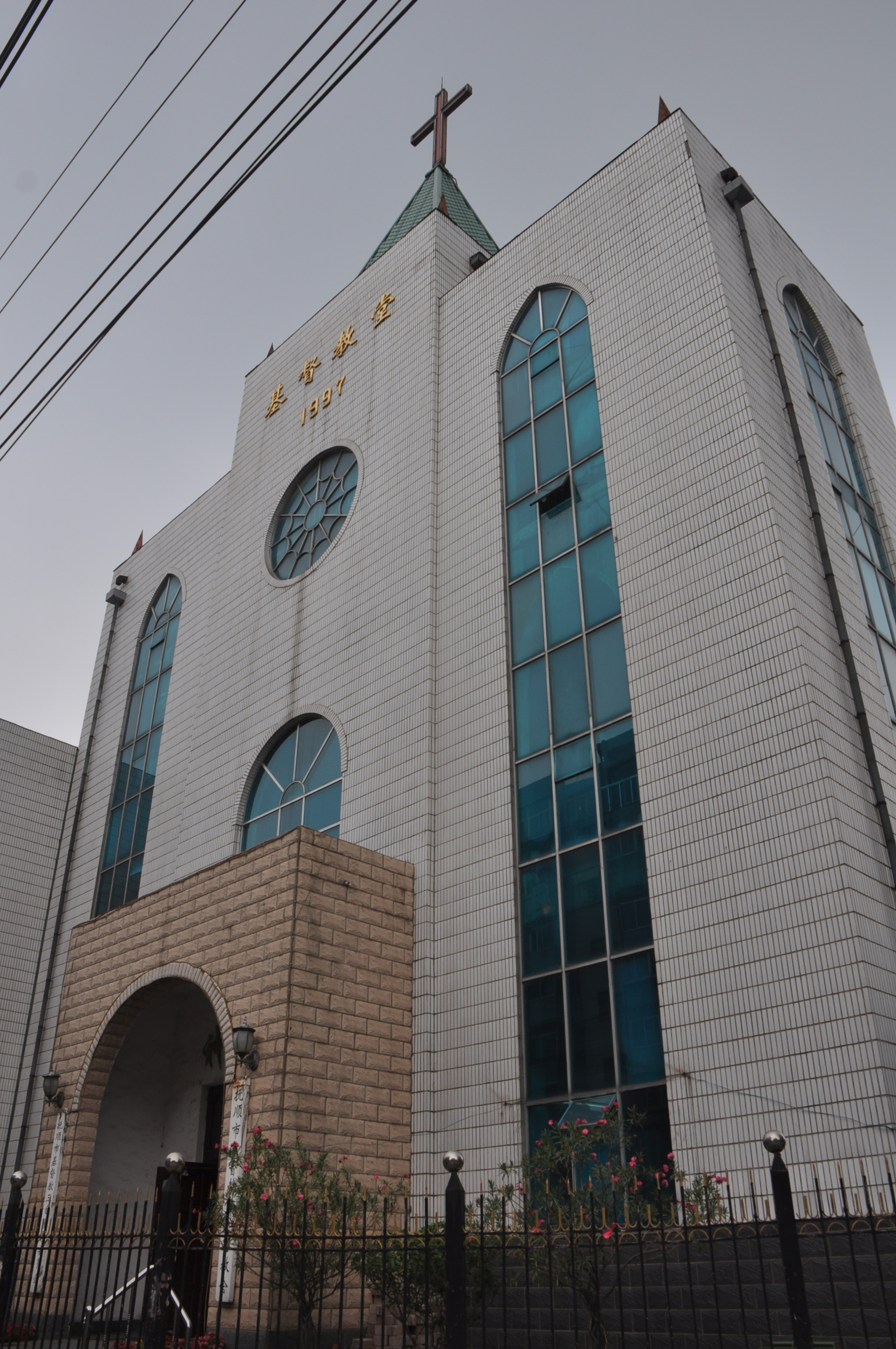
Zhonghelu Protestant Church, Fushun, China

Zhonghelu Church (Chinese: 中和路教会) is a Protestant church located in Fushun, Liaoning Province, China. The current building was completed in 1998, after absorbing the Yingkelu Church. The church celebrated its 130th anniversary in 2012.

== History ==
The church has the following history:

- Early Stage: 1882-1927 年

John Ross, a Presbyterian missionary stationed in Fengtian, started his mission in Fushun (1882). Later a Japanese church, ministered by Tamio Kishda (Japanese: 岸田民雄) at Minamidai (Japanese: 南台), which after the end of the war would become the Yingkelu Church, the Qingyuanxian Church (Chinese: 清原县教会) for the ethnic Koreans in China, and other churches were established.

- Separate Presbyterian & Assemblies of God Churches: 1928-1958

The Presbyterian Church of Fengtian approved the establishment of the Presbyterian Church of Fushun (1928). An Assemblies of God church was also made in 1936. In 1942, all Protestant churches were included in the Church of Christ in Manchuria (Chinese: 满洲基督教会). In 1945, the Fushun church was re-established under the Church of Christ in China (Chinese: 中华基督教会).

- One Unified Presbyterian & Assemblies of God Church: 1959-1978

The Fushun City Three-Self Patriotic Movement Committee was established in 1958, and the Presbyterian and Assemblies of God churches were merged to become the Yingkelu Church (Chinese: 迎客路教会) in the following year. During the ten years of the Cultural Revolution, the church was persecuted and the believers held worship at home.

- Recovery and prosperity period: 1979-2012

Worship resumed at Yingkelu Church on 28 October 1980. Because the church building became dangerously old, a new building was built and consecrated at Zhonghelu Church on 17 July 1998, absorbing Yingkelu Church. In 2012, the church celebrated the 130th anniversary of the Gospel reaching Fushun.

Address: Zhonghe Road at Yidao Street, Xinfu District, Fushun City, Liaoning Province.

== See also ==
- Christianity in China
- Protestantism in China
- John Ross
- Protestant churches in Northeast China:

Dalian Yuguang Street Church, Shenyang Dongguan Church, Changchun Christian Church, Harbin Nangang Christian Church, etc.
