= Bible translations into Korean =

Until the 1990s, most Korean Bible translations used old-fashioned, antiquated language. This made it difficult for Christians that preferred colloquial terms to comprehend what the Bible said. By the 1990s, more colloquial and contemporary versions of the Korean Bible translations came about for Christians, which made it easier for them to comprehend and understand the words from the Bible in a more precise way.

== Conventional ==
=== Prior to 1784 ===
Prior to 1784, the small number of upper class Roman Catholic Christians in Korea had used Chinese Bibles, as those were translated into Classical Chinese by Jesuit Missionaries, which are shared between the two countries.

1784 – Roman Catholics translated a commentary on the exposition of the Bible, called the "Interpretation of the Bible" (성경직해). This contained various passages of scripture and proverbs translated from the Chinese Bible.

=== Before 1945 ===
- 1887 – The Ross New Testament (all New testament Books) by John Ross et al., at Dongguan Church in Mukden, Manchuria
- 1900 – Henry G. Appenzeller New Testament. Methodist Episcopal. Appenzeller's team includes Horace Grant Underwood, William B. Scranton and James Scarth Gale
- 1910 – Four Gospels (사사성경) by the Roman Catholic Diocese of Korea. Rev. Paul Han Gi Gun (한기근 바오로) and Rev. James Son Sung Jae (손성재 야고보) complete the Gospels from the Vulgate Latin version.
- 1910 – Korean Bible. William D. Reynolds (레널즈) with Lee Seung Doo (이승두) and Kim Jeong Sam (김정삼) complete the Old Testament.
- 1922 – The Acts Of The Apostles by the Roman Catholic Diocese of Korea.
- 1925 – The Gale Bible. James Scarth Gale's private translation
- 1923 – Fenwick New Testament. Malcolm C. Fenwick (1863–1935)
- 1938 – Old Korean Revised Version (성경개역) KBS
- 1941 – The EpistlesㆍApocalypse (신약성서 서간ㆍ묵시편) by Rev. Arnulf Schleicher, O.S.B.

=== Post-war ===
- 1958 – Book Of Genesis by Rev. Lawrence Seon Jong Wan (선종완 라우렌시오) of Roman Catholic.
- 1959 – Books Of ExodusㆍLeviticusㆍNumbersㆍDeuteronomyㆍJoshuaㆍJudgesㆍRuthㆍ1&2 Samuelㆍ1&2 Kings and Prophecy Of Isaias by Rev. Lawrence Seon Jong Wan of Roman Catholic.
- 1961 – KRV Korean Revised Version (개역한글). This version used to be a standard version for several decades in most Korean Protestant denominations and it was replaced by the New Korean Revised Version (NKRV) in mainstream Korean Protestant denominations in the mid-2000s. However, it is still in use in few conservative minor Protestant denominations. Korean Bible Society (KBS) (대한성서공회)
- 1963 – Prophecy&Lamentations Of Jeremias and Prophecy Of Baruch by Rev. Lawrence Seon Jong Wan of Roman Catholic.
- 1968 – Book Of Psalms by Rev. John Choi Min Sun (최민순 요한) of Roman Catholic.
- 1971 – CTNT Common Translation New Testament (공동번역 신약성서) KBS.
- 1977 – CTB Common Translation Bible (공동번역성서 共同翻譯聖書). 1999 Common Translation with minor corrections (공동번역 성서 개정판) KBS. Worked by Catholic priests and liberal Protestant scholars or pastors. This ecumenical translation had been a standard bible for the Roman Catholic Church in Korea from 1977 to 2005. This revised version in 1999 is used by the Anglican Church of Korea and the Orthodox Church of Korea.
- 1983/1984 – CTBP Common Translation Bible Pyongyang version (공동번역성서 평양교정본). Produced by the government controlled Korean Christian Association in North Korea, it is based on the CTB. The New Testament was printed in 1983 and the Old Testament in 1984. The revised edition from 1990 contains both in one volume.
- 1985 – KLB Korean Living Bible (현대인의성경). A Korean re-translation of the Living Bible (생명의 말씀사)
- 1991 – 200th Year Anniversary Edition of the New Testament (한국천주교 창립 200주년 신약성서) – Waegwan Abbey, revised in 1998
- 1991 – TKV Today's Korean Version (현대어성경) (성서원). It was replaced by the Korean Common Language Bible in 2012.
- 1993 – NKSV New Korean Standard Bible, (표준새번역) Its literary style is contemporary. However, due to disputes by conservative evangelicals, it failed to gain the status as the standard lectionary bible in mainstream Korean Protestant churches. rev. 2001. It was replaced by the Revised New Korean Standard Version (RNKSV) in 2004.
- 1997 – True Bible (바른 성경) Korean Society of the Holy Bible (KSHB; not to be confused with KBS) (한국성경공회)
- 1998 – NKRV New Korean Revised Version (개역개정) KBS. Some archaic words are revised into contemporary words, but the old-fashioned literary style of the Korean Revised Version is still retained. It is the standard Bible in use in most Korean Protestant denominations, replacing the Korean Revised Version.
- 1998 – Revised 200th Year Anniversary Edition of the New Testament (한국천주교 창립 200주년 신약성서 개정판) – Waegwan Abbey
- 1999 – New World Translation (NWT) (신세계역 성경) Jehovah's Witnesses(여호와의 증인) in contemporary language.
- 1999 – Revised Common Translation Bible (RCTB) with minor corrections (공동번역 성서 개정판) KBS. This revised version in 1999 is used by the Anglican Church of Korea and the Orthodox Church of Korea.

== 21st century ==
- 2001 – Agape Easy Bible (아가페 쉬운 성경). Agape publisher(아가페 출판사)
- 2004 – RNKSV Revised New Korean Standard Version (새번역 성경), replacing the New Korean Standard Version (NKSV). Korean Bible Society (KBS) (대한성서공회)
- 2004 – DKV Duranno Korean Version (우리말 성경) = Woorimal Bible. 두란노 서원
- 2005 – The Holy Bible (성경) – Catholic Bishops' Conference of Korea (CBCK: 한국천주교주교회의) This version is the standard Bible for the Roman Catholic Church in Korea since 2005, replacing the Common Translation Bible.
- 2006 – Braille Bible (점자 성경) – Catholic Bishops' Conference of Korea (CBCK: 한국천주교주교회의)
- 2012 – Korean Common Language Bible (쉬운말 성경) replacing the Today's Korean Version (TKV). Bible House (성서원)
- 2014 – Revised New World Translation (신세계역 개정판), Jehovah's Witnesses (여호와의 증인)
- 2017 – God's Promises: New Testament (하나님의 약속: 예수 후전), Pyongyang Bible Institute (for North Korea)
- 2024 – NKT New Korean Translation (새한글 성경). Korean Bible Society (KBS) (대한성서공회)

== Authorization by major denominations ==
- The Holy Bible (성경), translated by the Catholic Bishop's conference in 2005, which became the standard Bible for the Catholic Church in Korea.
- Protestant denominations authorize NKRV New Korean Revised Version (개역개정), KRV Korean Revised Version (개역한글) and RNSV Revised New Korean Standard Version (새번역) (the order of popularity) for their services.
- The conservative denominations in the Christian Council of Korea commonly authorize KRV Korean Revised Version (개역한글) and NKRV New Korean Revised Version (개역개정). NKRV is more popular for liturgical uses, but due to its old-fashioned style, other versions with the contemporary language are frequently read in the youth services.
- Other mainstream denominations with the liberal affiliations choose RNSV (새번역) as well.
- CTB Common Translation Bible (공동번역), once used in the Catholic Church and a number of Protestant churches in the 1990s, lost its popularity as the Catholic Church moves out from using it for liturgical purposes. RCTB Revised Common Translation Bible in 1999 is now authorized by the Anglican Church of Korea and Korean Orthodox Church.

== Comparison ==
Translation	Genesis (창세기) 1:1–3	John (요한 복음서) 3:16
The Old Catholic Version	비롯음에 천주께서 하늘과 땅을 창조하셨느니라. 땅은 아직 꼴을 갖추지 못하고 비었으며, 온 심연 위를 어두움이 덮었더라. 그런데 천주의 기운이 물 위에 빙빙 돌으시더니 천주께서 가라사대 "빛이 생기어라!" 하시매, 빛이 생기니라.	천주 이처럼 세상을 사랑하사 당신 독생성자를 주시기까지 하사 무릇 저를 믿는 자로 하여금 멸망치 아니하고 오직 영생을 얻게 하셨으니
Korean Revised Version (개역한글) (KRV)	태초에 하나님이 천지를 창조하시니라 땅이 혼돈하고 공허하며 흑암이 깊음 위에 있고 하나님의 신은 수면에 운행하시니라 하나님이 가라사대 빛이 있으라 하시매 빛이 있었고	하나님이 세상을 이처럼 사랑하사 독생자를 주셨으니 이는 저를 믿는 자마다 멸망치 않고 영생을 얻게 하려 하심이니라
Common Translation Bible (공동번역) (CTB)	한 처음 하느님께서 하늘과 땅을 지어 내셨다. 땅은 아직 모양을 갖추지 않고 아무 것도 생기지 않았는데, 어둠이 깊은 물 위에 뒤덮여 있었고 그 물 위에 하느님의 기운이 휘돌고 있었다. 하느님께서 "빛이 생겨라!" 하시자 빛이 생겨났다.	하느님은 이 세상을 극진히 사랑하셔서 외아들을 보내 주시어 그를 믿는 사람은 누구든지 멸망하지 않고 영원한 생명을 얻게 하여 주셨다.
Korean Living Bible (현대인의성경) (KLB)	태초에 하나님이 우주를 창조하셨다. 지구는 아무 형태도 없이 텅 비어 흑암에 싸인 채 물로 뒤덮여 있었고 하나님의 영은 수면에 활동하고 계셨다. 그때 하나님이 '빛이 있으라' 라고 말씀하시자 빛이 나타났다.	하나님이 세상을 무척 사랑하셔서 하나밖에 없는 외아들마저 보내 주셨으니 누구든지 그를 믿기만 하면 멸망하지 않고 영원한 생명을 얻는다.
New Korean Standard Bible, (표준새번역) (NKSB)	태초에 하나님이 천지를 창조하셨다. 땅이 혼돈하고 공허하며, 어둠이 깊음 위에 있고, 하나님의 영은 물 위에 움직이고 계셨다. 하나님이 말씀하시기를 "빛이 생겨라" 하시니, 빛이 생겼다.	하나님이 세상을 이처럼 사랑하셔서 독생자를 주셨으니, 누구든지 그를 믿으면 멸망하지 않고 영생을 얻을 것이다.
Today's Korean Version (현대어성경) (TKV)	태초에 하나님이 하늘과 땅을 창조하셨다. 땅은 아직도 제대로 꼴을 갖추고 있지 않은 상태였으며, 또한 아무 것도 생겨나지 않아 쓸쓸하기 그지 없었다. 깊디깊은 바다는 그저 캄캄한 어둠에 휩싸여 있을 뿐이었고 하나님의 영이 그 어두운 바다 위를 휘감아 돌고 있었다. 하나님께서 '빛이 생겨나 환히 비춰라' 하고 명령하시자 빛이 생겨나 환히 비추었다.	하나님이 이처럼 세상을 극진히 사랑하셔서 외아들을 보내주셨으니 이는 누구든지 그를 믿는 사마다 멸망하지 않고 영원한 생명을 얻게 하려는 것이다.
Agape Easy Bible (아가페 쉬운 성경)	태초에 하나님께서 하늘과 땅을 창조하셨습니다. 그런데 그 땅은 지금처럼 짜임새 있는 모습이 아니었고, 생물 하나 없이 텅 비어 있었습니다. 어둠이 깊은 바다를 덮고 있었고, 하나님의 영은 물 위에서 움직이고 계셨습니다. 그 때에 하나님께서 말씀하셨습니다. "빛이 생겨라!" 그러자 빛이 생겼습니다.	이와 같이 하나님께서는 세상을 사랑하여 독생자를 주셨다. 이는 누구든지 그의 아들을 믿는 사람은 멸망하지 않고 영생을 얻게 하려 하심이다.
Duranno Korean Version (DKV) = Woorimal Bible (우리말 성경)	하나님께서 태초에 하늘과 땅을 창조하셨습니다. 땅은 형태가 없고 비어 있었으며 어둠이 깊은 물 위에 있었고 하나님의 영은 수면 위에 움직이고 계셨습니다. 하나님께서 말씀하시기를 “빛이 있으라” 하시니 빛이 생겼습니다.	하나님께서 세상을 이처럼 사랑하셔서 독생자를 주셨으니 이는 그를 믿는 사람마다 멸망하지 않고 영생을 얻게 하려는 것이다.
New Korean Revised Version (개역개정) (NKRV)	태초에 하나님이 천지를 창조하시니라 땅이 혼돈하고 공허하며 흑암이 깊음 위에 있고 하나님의 영은 수면 위에 운행하시니라 하나님이 이르시되 빛이 있으라 하시니 빛이 있었고	하나님이 세상을 이처럼 사랑하사 독생자를 주셨으니 이는 그를 믿는 자마다 멸망하지 않고 영생을 얻게 하려 하심이라
Holy Bible (성경) (Catholic)	한처음에 하느님께서 하늘과 땅을 창조하셨다. 땅은 아직 꼴을 갖추지 못하고 비어 있었는데, 어둠이 심연을 덮고 하느님의 영이 그 물 위를 감돌고 있었다. 하느님께서 말씀하시기를 “빛이 생겨라.” 하시자 빛이 생겼다.	하느님께서는 세상을 너무나 사랑하신 나머지 외아들을 내주시어, 그를 믿는 사람은 누구나 멸망하지 않고 영원한 생명을 얻게 하셨다.
