= Changchun Christian Church =

Protestant church in China

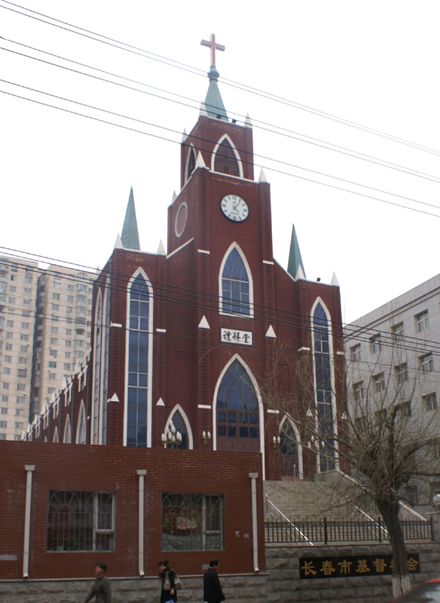
Changchun Christian Church, Changchun, China

Changchun Christian Church (Chinese: 长春基督教会) is one of the largest and historically important Protestant churches in Changchun, Jilin Province, China.

== General ==
Changchun Christian Church is one of the largest and historically important Protestant churches in Changchun, Jilin Province, China. Also housed here are the Three-Self Patriotic Movement Committees of Changchun City and Jilin Province.

The church's address is: No. 131, West Wuma Road, Nanguan District, Changchun City, 134402. It is also called the Xiwu Road church. Worship is held at 8:00 Sunday, 16:00 Wednesday, 16:00 Friday and 9:00 Saturday.

=== Brief history ===
- In 1886, the Irish Presbyterian Mission (Thomas Crosby Fulton, in Chinese: 傅多玛) was sent to Changchun.
- In 1893, joined by the English Presbyterian Mission (English name uncertain, in Chinese: 纪里备), which four years later built a church at the present site.
- In 1902, a medical hospital was built next to the church, which remains as Changchun Women's Hospital.
- In 1930, the church's annex building was built.
- In 1941, as the British-Japanese relations soured, the church was ceded to the Japanese and it became the Manchurian United Christian Church headquarters.
- After 1959, the church participates in the Three-Self Patriotic Movement and belongs to the China Christian Council.
- In 1998, the 3-storey present church building was built in an Irish Protestant church style. It can accommodate 6,000 people.

== See also ==
- Presbyterian Church
- Manchukuo
- Three-Self Patriotic Movement
- China Christian Council
- Protestant churches in Northeast China:

Dalian Yuguang Street Church, Shenyang Dongguan Church, Changchun Christian Church, Harbin Nangang Christian Church, etc.
