= Romanization of Korean (North Korea) =

Official romanization of North Korea

Rules of the Latin Alphabetical Transcriptions of the Korean Language is the official Korean-language romanization system in North Korea. Announced by the Academy of Social Sciences (Sahoe Kwahagwŏn), it is an adaptation of the older McCune–Reischauer system, which it replaced in 1992. It was updated in 2002 and 2012.

== Transcription rules ==
Vowels
Hangul	ㅏ	ㅑ	ㅓ	ㅕ	ㅗ	ㅛ	ㅜ	ㅠ	ㅡ	ㅣ	ㅐ	ㅒ	ㅔ	ㅖ	ㅚ	ㅟ	ㅢ	ㅘ	ㅝ	ㅙ	ㅞ
Romanization	a	ya	ŏ	yŏ	o	yo	u	yu	ŭ	i	ae	yae	e	ye	oi (Note: The 1992 version used oe instead; Rodong Sinmun still uses oe as of 2022.)	wi	ŭi	wa	wŏ	wae	we

Consonants
Hangul		ㄱ	ㄴ	ㄷ	ㄹ	ㅁ	ㅂ	ㅅ	ㅈ	ㅊ	ㅋ	ㅌ	ㅍ	ㅎ	ㄲ	ㄸ	ㅃ	ㅆ	ㅉ	ㅇ
Romanization	Initial	k	n	t	r	m	p	s	j	ch	kh	th	ph	h	kk	tt	pp	ss	jj	—
Romanization	Final	k	n	t	l	m	p	t	t	t	k	t	p	t	k	—	—	t	—	ng

- In double consonants in the end of a word or before a consonant, only one of them is written:

- 닭섬 → Taksŏm
- 물곬 → Mulkol

- However, in the case before a vowel, both consonants are written:

- 붉은 바위 → Pulgŭnbawi
- 앉은 바위 → Anjŭnbawi

- The soft voiceless consonants between vowels ㄱ, ㄷ, and ㅂ and those between resonant sounds and vowels are transcribed as g, d, and b.
- Final consonants may undergo assimilation before resonants.

- 백마산 → Paengmasan
- 꽃마을 → KKonmaŭl
- 압록강 → Amrokgang

- When lax consonants become tense in compound words, they are transcribed as tense consonants if they are preceded by a vowel. Also, if the next element begins with a resonant, then n is added before it.

- 기대산 → Kittaesan
- 새별읍 → Saeppyŏl-ŭp
- 뒤문 → Twinmun

- The consonant clusters ㄴㄹ and ㄴㄴ are only transcribed as ll if they correspond with longstanding usage; ㄹㄹ does not have a special transcription.

- 천리마 → Chŏllima
- 한나산 → Hallasan
- 찔레골 → JJilregol

- Double consonants may be capitalized as a single unit: kk → KK.

== Guide ==
A personal name is written by family name first, followed by a space and the given name with the first letter capitalized. Also, each letter of a name of Chinese character origin is written separately. The given name's first initial is transcribed in a voiceless letter, even when it becomes resonant in pronunciation.

- 김꽃분이 → Kim KKotpuni
- 박동구 → Pak Tong Gu
- 안복철 → An Pok Chŏl

However, it is not really possible to follow this rule because a certain name written in hangul can be a native Korean name, or a Sino-Korean name, or even both. For example, 보람 (Po Ram / Poram) can not only be a native Korean name, but can also be a Sino-Korean name (e.g. 寶濫). In some cases, parents intend a dual meaning: both the meaning from a native Korean word and the meaning from hanja. ALA-LC, which has a similar rule about given names (see McCune–Reischauer § ALA-LC variant), admitted that it is not really possible to determine whether a certain given name is Sino-Korean or not.

A name for administrative units is hyphenated from the placename proper:

- 도 → -do
- 시 → -si
- 군 → -gun
- 면 → -myŏn
- 리 → -ri
- 동 → -dong
- 구 → -gu
- 구역 → -guyŏk

However, a name for geographic features and artificial structures is not hyphenated:

- 산 → san
- 거리 → gŏri
- 고개 → gogae
- 대 → dae
- 봉 → bong
- 교 → gyo
- 골 → gol
- 각 → gak
- 벌 → bŏl
- 관 → gwan
- 곶 → got
- 강 → gang

Sound changes are not transcribed in the suffixes above:

- 삿갓봉 → Satkatbong
- 압록강 → Amrokgang

Transcription of geographical names may be simplified by removing breves and by reducing initial double consonants to single consonants:

- 서포 → Sŏpho → Sopho
- 찔레골 → JJilregol → Jilregol
