= McCune–Reischauer =

Korean language romanization system

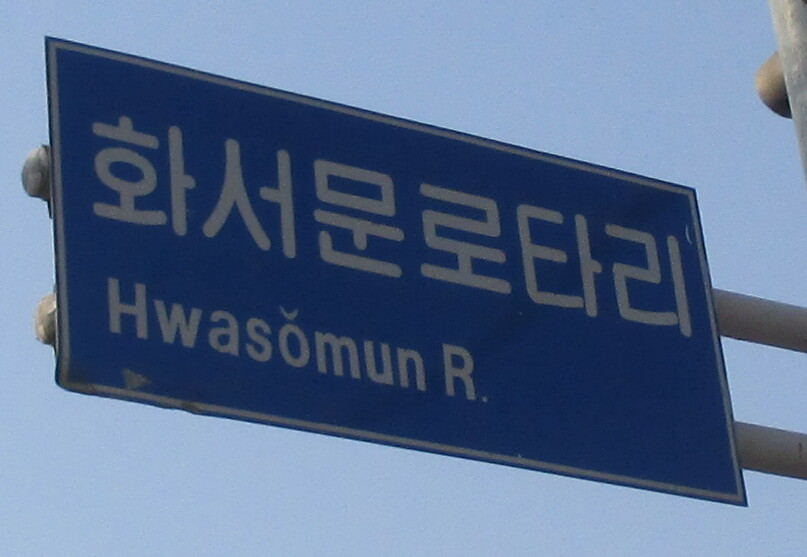
In this 2014 photo of a road sign in Suwon, 화서문 is romanized Hwasŏmun, using McCune–Reischauer. It would be Hwaseomun in Revised Romanization.

McCune–Reischauer (MR; /məˈkjuːn ˈraɪʃaʊ.ər/ mə-KEWN RYSHE-ow-ər) is a romanization system for the Korean language. It was first published in 1939 by George M. McCune and Edwin O. Reischauer. Significant work on the system was done by Korean linguists Choe Hyeon-bae, Jeong In-seop, and Kim Seon-gi.

According to Reischauer, McCune "persuaded the American Army Map Service to adopt [the McCune–Reischauer system], and through the Korean War it became the foundation for most current Romanizations of Korean place names."

A variant of McCune–Reischauer is currently used as the official system in North Korea. Another variant is currently used for standard romanization library catalogs in North America. On the other hand, South Korea formerly used yet another variant as its official system from 1984 to 2000, but replaced it with the Revised Romanization of Korean in 2000.

== Characteristics ==
The following are some characteristics of the McCune–Reischauer system:

- With a few exceptions, it does not attempt to transliterate Korean hangul but rather represents the phonetic pronunciation.
  - Example: 독립 (pronounced [동닙]) tongnip (not *tokrip)
- The voiceless and voiced allophones of the Korean phonemes /ㄱ/, /ㄷ/, /ㅂ/, and /ㅈ/ are transcribed differently.
  - Examples: 가구 kagu, 등대 tŭngdae, 반복 panbok, 주장 chujang
- The apostrophe is used for transcribing strongly aspirated consonants ㅋ, ㅌ, ㅍ, and ㅊ (k', t', p' and ch' respectively), and for distinguishing ㄴㄱ (n'g) from ㅇㅇ (ng).
  - Examples: 투표 t'up'yo; 연구 yŏn'gu (cf. 영어 yŏngŏ)
- The breve is used for the vowels ㅓ (ŏ) and ㅡ (ŭ), and diphthongs containing those sounds (ㅕ yŏ, ㅝ wŏ; ㅢ ŭi).

=== Use of diacritics and their omission ===
McCune–Reischauer employs dual use of apostrophes, with the more common being for syllabic boundaries. Therefore, it may take some time for learners to familiarise themselves with the placement of apostrophes to determine how a romanized Korean word is pronounced. For example, 마찬가지 → mach'an'gaji, which consists of the syllables ma, ch'an, ga, and ji.

In the early days of the Internet, the apostrophe and breve were even omitted altogether for both technical and practical reasons, which made it impossible to differentiate the strongly aspirated consonants k', t', p' and ch' from the unaspirated consonants k, t, p and ch, and the vowels ㅓ and ㅡ from ㅗ and ㅜ.

For example, if the diacritics in the MR rendering of the name of South Korean city Ch'ŏngju (청주; Cheongju) are omitted (Chongju), it overlaps with the name of North Korean city Chongju (정주; Jeongju). There is a claim of uncertain veracity (Note: A number of later news articles describe this story as only a rumor. One journalist claimed the story went that the US almost but did not actually bomb Cheongju. However, other articles have presented the story as true.) that, during the 1950–1953 Korean War, the US Army accidentally (or almost) bombed the wrong city due to this.

As a result, the South Korean government introduced a revised system of romanization in 2000. However, Korean critics claimed that the Revised System fails to represent ㅓ and ㅡ in a way that is easily recognizable and misrepresents the way that the unaspirated consonants are actually pronounced.

== Guide ==
This is a simplified guide for the McCune–Reischauer system.

=== Vowels ===
Hangul	ㅏ	ㅐ	ㅑ	ㅒ	ㅓ	ㅔ (Note: 에 is romanized ë after ㅏ and ㅗ. This is to distinguish ㅏ에 (aë) from ㅐ (ae), and ㅗ에 (oë) from ㅚ (oe).)	ㅕ	ㅖ	ㅗ	ㅘ	ㅙ	ㅚ	ㅛ	ㅜ	ㅝ	ㅞ	ㅟ	ㅠ	ㅡ	ㅢ	ㅣ
Romanization	a	ae	ya	yae	ŏ	e	yŏ	ye	o	wa	wae	oe	yo	u	wŏ	we	wi	yu	ŭ	ŭi	i

=== Consonants ===
==== Word-initially and word-finally ====
Hangul		ㄱ	ㄲ	ㄴ	ㄷ	ㄸ	ㄹ	ㅁ	ㅂ	ㅃ	ㅅ (Note: ㅅ is romanized sh before ㅟ (wi).)	ㅆ (Note: While ㅆ is also used as a syllabic final (unlike ㄸ, ㅃ, and ㅉ which are only used as syllabic initials), it does not occur at the end of a word.)	ㅇ (Note: As a syllabic initial, ㅇ is not romanized, since it stands for the absence of a consonant sound in this position.)	ㅈ	ㅉ	ㅊ	ㅋ	ㅌ	ㅍ	ㅎ
Romanization	Word-initial	k	kk	n	t	tt	r	m	p	pp	s	ss	—	ch	tch	ch'	k'	t'	p'	h
Romanization	Word-final	k	k	n	t	—	l	m	p	—	t	—	ng	t	—	t	k	t	p	t

The heterogeneous consonant digraphs (ㄳ, ㄵ, ㄶ, ㄺ, ㄻ, ㄼ, ㄽ, ㄾ, ㄿ, ㅀ, and ㅄ) exist only as syllabic finals and are transcribed by their actual pronunciation.

==== Word-medially ====
The following table is sufficient for the transcription of most proper names.

Final consonant of the previous syllable + initial consonant of the next syllable
		Initial (Note: Any syllabic final + syllabic initial combination with the syllabic initial ㅊ (ch'), ㅋ (k'), ㅌ (t'), or ㅍ (p') is the same as concatenating the word-final and word-initial values above (e.g. ㄱㅊ is simply kch', ㅇㅍ is simply ngp', and so on), hence not shown in this table.)														
		ㅇ —	ㄱ k	ㄲ kk	ㄴ n	ㄷ t	ㄸ tt	ㄹ r	ㅁ m	ㅂ p	ㅃ pp	ㅅ s	ㅆ ss	ㅈ ch	ㅉ tch	ㅎ h
Final	(vowel) (Note: When the previous syllable ends in a vowel (e.g. 아주 is romanized aju, not achu).)	—	g	kk	n	d	tt	r	m	b	pp	s	ss	j	tch	h
Final	ㄱ k	g	kk	kk	ngn	kt	ktt	ngn	ngm	kp	kpp	ks	kss	kch	ktch	kh
Final	ㄴ n	n	n'g	nkk	nn	nd	ntt	ll	nm	nb	npp	ns	nss	nj	ntch	nh
Final	ㄷ t	d	tk	tkk	nn	tt	tt	nn	nm	tp	tpp	ss	ss	tch	tch	th
Final	ㄹ l	r	lg	lkk	ll	ld (Note: In Sino-Korean words, usually lt.)	ltt	ll	lm	lb	lpp	ls	lss	lj (Note: In Sino-Korean words, usually lch.)	ltch	rh
Final	ㅁ m	m	mg	mkk	mn	md	mtt	mn	mm	mb	mpp	ms	mss	mj	mtch	mh
Final	ㅂ p	b	pk	pkk	mn	pt	ptt	mn	mm	pp	pp	ps	pss	pch	ptch	ph
Final	ㅇ ng	ng	ngg	ngkk	ngn	ngd	ngtt	ngn	ngm	ngb	ngpp	ngs	ngss	ngj	ngtch	ngh

The following subsections are for cases not covered by the table above, or for cases where the result should be different from the table.

===== Any non-ㅎ syllabic final + syllabic initial ㅇ =====
In this combination, the syllabic final (except ㅇ, which is always ng) is

1. either directly transferred to the syllabic initial position of the next syllable (i.e. replacing the ㅇ),
  - Examples: 독일 [도길] Togil, 낟알 [나달] nadal, 촬영 [촤령] ch'waryŏng, 답안 [다반] taban, 웃어라 [우서라] usŏra, 낮은 [나즌] najŭn
  1. When the syllabic final ㄷ or ㅌ (including ㄾ) is followed by 이, palatalization occurs.
    - Examples: 미닫이 [미다지] midaji, 같이 [가치] kach'i, 훑이다 [훌치다] hulch'ida
  2. Syllabic final digraphs are split.
    - Examples: 앉아 [안자] anja, 읊어 [을퍼] ŭlp'ŏ
2. or neutralized to one of {ㄱ, ㄴ, ㄷ, ㄹ, ㅁ, ㅂ} first, and then transferred to the syllabic initial position of the next syllable.
  - Examples: 웃어른 [욷어른→우더른] udŏrŭn, 값어치 [갑어치→가버치] kabŏch'i

===== Any non-ㅎ syllabic final + syllabic initial {ㄱ, ㄷ, ㅂ, ㅈ} =====
If the syllabic initial is pronounced

- {[ㄱ], [ㄷ], [ㅂ], [ㅈ]}, they are romanized {g, d, b, j}. When g is preceded by n, an apostrophe is added between them (i.e. n'g).
- {[ㄲ], [ㄸ], [ㅃ], [ㅉ]}, they are romanized {k, t, p, ch} (not {kk, tt, pp, tch}).

Examples:

- 대궐 [대궐] taegwŏl vs. 태권도 [태꿘도] t'aekwŏndo
- 전등 [전등] chŏndŭng vs. 손등 [손뜽] sontŭng
- 물방아 [물방아] mulbanga vs. 물방울 [물빵울] mulpangul
- 환자 [환자] hwanja vs. 한자(漢字) [한짜] hancha

===== Any syllabic final + syllabic initial ㅎ =====
Any combination with the syllabic initial ㅎ is transcribed based on the actual pronunciation, except when the result is [ㅋ], [ㅌ], or [ㅍ]; these are treated as ㄱㅎ (kh), ㄷㅎ (th), and ㅂㅎ (ph) respectively.

- Examples: 앉히다 [안치다] anch'ida, 굳히다 [구치다] kuch'ida, 맞히다 [마치다] mach'ida
- Examples of exceptions:
  - 속히 ([소키], but treated as [속히]) sokhi
  - 못하다 ([모타다], treated as [몯하다]) mothada
  - 곱하기 ([고파기], treated as [곱하기]) kophagi

===== Syllabic final ㅎ + any syllabic initial =====
Any combination with the syllabic final ㅎ (including ㄶ and ㅀ) is transcribed based on the actual pronunciation.

- Examples: 좋다 [조타] chot'a, 많네 [만네] manne, 끓고 [끌코] kkŭlk'o

=== Personal names ===
The rules stated above are also applied in personal names, except between a surname and a given name. A surname and a given name are separated by a space, but multiple syllables within a surname or within a given name are joined without hyphens or spaces.

The original 1939 paper states the following:

The Romanization of Proper Names and Titles

Proper names like words should not be divided into syllables, as has often been done in the past. For example, the geographic term 光州 should be romanized Kwangju. Irregularities occurring in proper names such as in P'yŏngyang 平壤 which is colloquially pronounced P'iyang or P'eyang, should usually be ignored in romanizations intended for scholarly use.

Personal names demand special consideration. As in China, the great majority of surnames are monosyllables representing a single character, while a few are two character names. The given name, which follows the surname, usually has two characters but sometimes only one. In both two character surnames and two character given names the general rules of euphonic change should be observed, and the two syllables should be written together.

The problem of the euphonic changes between a surname and given name or title is very difficult. A man known as Paek Paksa 백 박사 (Dr. Paek) might prove to have the full name of Paeng Nakchun 백낙준 because of the assimilation of the final k of his surname and the initial n of his given name. The use in romanization of both Dr. Paek and Paeng Nakchun for the same person would result in considerable confusion. Therefore it seems best for romanizations purposes to disregard euphonic changes between surnames and given names or titles, so that the above name should be romanized Paek Nakchun.

For ordinary social use our romanization often may not prove suitable for personal names. Even in scholarly work there are also a few instances of rather well-established romanizations for proper names which might be left unchanged, just as the names of some of the provinces of China still have traditional romanizations not in accord with the Wade–Giles system. There is, for example, Seoul, which some may prefer to the Sŏul of our system. Another very important example is 李, the surname of the kings of the last Korean dynasty and still a very common Korean surname. Actually it is pronounced in the standard dialect and should be romanized I, but some may prefer to retain the older romanization, Yi, because that is already the familiar form. In any case the other romanizations of 李, Ri and Li, should not be used.

The original paper also gives McCune–Reischauer romanizations for a number of other personal names:

- Ch'oe Hyŏnbae (최현배), Chŏng Insŏp (정인섭), Kim Sŏn'gi (김선기)
- Ch'oe Namsŏn (최남선; 崔南善)
- Kim Yongun (김용운; 金龍雲), O Sejun (오세준; 吳世𤀹)

== History ==
George M. McCune, son of Pyongyang-based missionary George Shannon McCune, was born in Korea in 1905. After attending university in the United States, he returned to Korea (which was then under Japanese rule) in the summer of 1937 to work on his PhD dissertation for the University of California, Berkeley. In Korea, he studied at Chōsen Christian College (predecessor to Yonsei University) in Seoul (then called "Keijō") under the Korean linguists Choe Hyeon-bae, Jeong In-seop, and Kim Seon-gi. Around September of that year, Japanologist Edwin O. Reischauer became stranded in Keijō while he was en route to Beijing due to the Second Sino-Japanese War. During Reischauer's two-month stay there, he and McCune worked with Choe, Jeong, and Kim to develop what would become the McCune–Reischauer romanization system. Work continued on the system even after Reischauer departed Korea to China. Eventually, the system was published in 1939 in the journal Transactions of the Royal Asiatic Society Korea Branch.

In 1980, Reischauer wrote in a letter that the system was devised at his suggestion because he "found absolutely no uniform system of any sort, and [he] needed something for the Korean names that appeared in [his] studies on the travels of the [Japanese] monk Ennin". He also wrote that they designed the system "with only scholars in mind", and that he felt it was too complicated for regular use. He expressed hope that a new romanization that "everyone would use for both scholarly and popular use [would] be worked out and adopted".

English-language newspaper The Korea Times adopted the system in the 1950s. The system received pushback from Koreans. It came to be seen as more intuitive for foreigners and less intuitive for Koreans, as it reflected pronunciation changes that most Koreans were not consciously aware of. Fouser argued that another point of contention was related to nationalism; some disliked that the system had been developed by foreigners during the Japanese colonial period, and wanted a natively developed alternative. In 1959, the South Korean Ministry of Education published a romanization system, which has since been dubbed the Ministry of Education system (MOE). The system was immediately controversial, especially among foreigners. Fouser evaluated the system as prioritizing use for Koreans; it had a one-to-one correspondence from Hangul to Latin script and did not reflect pronunciation changes that Hangul did not. In June 1981, a number of scholars met at the University of Hawaii's Center for Korean Studies and developed a number of proposed changes to MR. The changes were largely based on a draft proposal from the US Library of Congress and were meant to aid use by librarians. For example, it was designed to promote reversibility, which was to the interest of librarians. In the 1980s, the South Korean government began considering whether to use a more foreigner-friendly system in anticipation of the 1986 Asian Games and the 1988 Summer Olympics, which were to be held in Seoul. In 1984, a slightly modified version of McCune–Reischauer was adopted. Some South Koreans reportedly had negative reactions to the system, which they viewed as confusing and overly beholden to pronunciation.

With the spread of computers and the Internet in the 1990s, complaints and debate about MR grew. This was primarily related to the system's use of diacritics, which are difficult to access on standard keyboards. In 1997, the South Korean government began moving to revise or switch romanization systems.

In contemporary South Korea, which has since adopted Revised Romanization, MR has left a lasting legacy in a number of cases:

- "TK" standing for Daegu and Gyeongbuk (from the MR spellings "Taegu" and "Kyŏngbuk")
  - First used on December 23, 1987
- "PK" standing for Busan and Gyeongnam (from the MR spellings "Pusan" and "Kyŏngnam")
- Some IATA airport codes
  - "CJU" for Jeju International Airport (from "Cheju")
  - "PUS" for Gimhae International Airport (from "Pusan", the city in which this airport is located)
  - "TAE" for Daegu International Airport (from "Taegu")
  - "HIN" for Sacheon Airport (from "Chinju", an adjacent city)
  - "KWJ" for Gwangju Airport (from "Kwangju")
  - "CHN" for Jeonju Airport (from "Chŏnju")
  - "KAG" for Gangneung Air Base (from "Kangnŭng")

== Variants ==
=== North Korean variant ===
A variant of McCune–Reischauer is currently in official use in North Korea. The following are the differences between the original McCune–Reischauer and the North Korean variant:

- Aspirated consonants are represented by adding an h instead of an apostrophe.
  - However, ㅊ is transcribed as ch, not chh.
- ㅈ is transcribed as j even when it is voiceless.
- ㅉ is transcribed as jj instead of tch.
- ㄹㄹ is transcribed as lr instead of ll.
- ㄹㅎ is transcribed as lh instead of rh.
- When ㄹ is pronounced as ㄴ, it is still transcribed as r instead of n.
- ㄴㄱ and ㅇㅇ are differentiated by a hyphen.
  - But when ng is followed by y or w, a hyphen is not used, like the original system.
- In personal names, each syllable in a Sino-Korean given name is separated by a space with the first letter of each syllable capitalized (e.g. 안복철 An Pok Chŏl). Syllables in a native Korean name are joined without syllabic division (e.g. 김꽃분이 Kim KKotpuni).
  - However, it is not really possible to follow this rule. See the § ALA-LC variant section below.

The following table illustrates the differences above.

Hangul	McCune–Reischauer	North Korean variant	Meaning
편지	p'yŏnji	phyŏnji	letter (message)
주체	Chuch'e	Juche	Juche
안쪽	antchok	anjjok	inside
빨리	ppalli	ppalri	quickly
발해	Parhae	Palhae	Parhae
목란	mongnan	mongran	Magnolia sieboldii
연구	yŏn'gu	yŏn-gu	research, study
영어	yŏngŏ	yŏng-ŏ	English language
안복철	An Pokch'ŏl	An Pok Chŏl	personal name (surname 안, given name 복철)

=== South Korean variant ===
A variant of McCune–Reischauer was in official use in South Korea from 1984 to 2000. The following are the differences between the original McCune–Reischauer and the South Korean variant:

- 시 was written as shi instead of the original system's si. When ㅅ is followed by ㅣ, it is realized as [ɕ] (similar to English [ʃ] (sh as in show)) instead of [s]. The original system uses sh only in 쉬, as shwi.
- ㅝ was written as wo instead of the original system's wŏ. Because the diphthong w (ㅗ or ㅜ as a semivowel) + o (ㅗ) does not exist in Korean phonology, the South Korean government omitted the breve in wŏ.
- Hyphens were used to distinguish between ㄴㄱ and ㅇㅇ, between ㅏ에 and ㅐ, and between ㅗ에 and ㅚ in this variant system, instead of the apostrophes and ë in the original version. Therefore, apostrophes were used only for aspiration marks and ë was not used in the South Korean system.
- ㄹㅎ was written as lh instead of rh.
- Assimilation-induced aspiration by a syllabic initial ㅎ was indicated. ㄱㅎ is written as kh in the original system and as k' in the South Korean variant.
- In personal names, each syllable in a given name was separated by a hyphen. The consonants ㄱ, ㄷ, ㅂ, and ㅈ right after a hyphen were transcribed using the voiceless letter (k, t, p, and ch respectively) even when they are voiced (e.g. 남궁동자 Namgung Tong-cha). But a hyphen can be omitted in non-Sino-Korean names (e.g. 한하나 Han Hana).
  - However, it is not really possible to follow this rule. See the § ALA-LC variant section below.
- When there are technical difficulties, omitting breves and apostrophes was allowed as long as there is no confusion in meaning.
  - In practice, English-language newspapers such as The Korea Herald usually omitted them when writing place names.
- The breve and the apostrophe were given Korean names: the breve was called 반달표 (pandalp'yo; 'half moon mark') and the apostrophe was called 어깻점 (ŏkkaetchŏm; 'shoulder dot'). (Note: Ironically, "pandalp'yo" does not contain a breve, but contains an apostrophe; "ŏkkaetchŏm" does not contain an apostrophe, but contains breves.)

The following table illustrates the differences above.

Hangul	McCune–Reischauer	South Korean variant	Meaning
시장	sijang	shijang	market
쉽다	shwipta	swipta	easy
소원	sowŏn	sowon	wish
연구	yŏn'gu	yŏn-gu	research, study
영어	yŏngŏ	yŏng-ŏ	English language
회사에서	hoesaësŏ	hoesa-esŏ	at a company
차고에	ch'agoë	ch'ago-e	in a garage
발해	Parhae	Palhae	Parhae
낙하산	nakhasan	nak'asan	parachute
못하다	mothada	mot'ada	to be poor at
곱하기	kophagi	kop'agi	multiplication
남궁동자	Namgung Tongja	Namgung Tong-cha	personal name (surname 남궁, given name 동자)

=== ALA-LC variant ===
Among the various ALA-LC romanization systems is one for Korean. It is currently used for standard romanization library catalogs in North America. It is based on but deviates from McCune–Reischauer. The following are some differences between the original McCune–Reischauer and the ALA-LC variant:

- Unlike the original McCune–Reischauer, it addresses word division in 29 pages of detail.
  - A postposition (or particle) is separated from its preceding word, even though the original McCune–Reischauer paper explicitly states that this should not be done.
- /ㄷ/ + /ㅆ/ is written as ts instead of ss.
- The surname 이 is written as Yi instead of I.
- For given names:
  - A hyphen is inserted between the syllables of a two-syllable given name only when it is preceded by a surname, with the sound change between the syllables indicated (e.g. 이석민 Yi Sŏng-min). The original McCune–Reischauer paper explicitly states that this also should not be done.
  - If a given name is three syllables long or is of non-Sino-Korean origin, the syllables are joined without syllabic division (e.g. 신사임당 Sin Saimdang, 김삿갓 Kim Satkat).
  - However, it is not really possible to follow this rule because a certain name written in hangul can be a native Korean name, or a Sino-Korean name, or even both. For example, 보람 can not only be a native Korean name, but can also be a Sino-Korean name (e.g. 寶濫). In some cases, parents intend a dual meaning: both the meaning from a native Korean word and the meaning from hanja. In fact, ALA-LC admitted that it is not really possible to determine whether a certain given name is Sino-Korean or not.

The following table illustrates the differences above.

Hangul	McCune–Reischauer	ALA-LC variant	Meaning
꽃이	kkoch'i	kkot i	flower + (subject marker)
굳세다	kusseda	kutseda	strong, firm
이석민	I Sŏngmin	Yi Sŏng-min	personal name (surname 이, given name 석민)

The older (1997) version of the ALA-LC rule used ʻ for strongly aspirated consonants and ʼ for ㄴㄱ (e.g. 마찬가지 machʻanʼgaji), even though the original McCune–Reischauer paper uses the ’ shape for both. This distinction in the older ALA-LC rule was removed in the new ALA-LC rule above.
