= A Korean-English Dictionary =

Dictionary first published in 1897

A Korean-English Dictionary (Korean: 한영자전; 한영자뎐; 한영ᄌᆞ뎐; Hanja: 韓英字典) is an 1897 dictionary originally compiled by Canadian missionary in Korea James Scarth Gale that described words in the Korean language in English. It was the second ever English-Korean dictionary (after Horace Grant Underwood's 한영ᄌᆞ뎐), and the largest at the time of its publication. The dictionary played a major role in the learning of English in Korea, and reportedly remained significant even until 1968, when a new major dictionary was published. The dictionary also contained one of the earliest major romanization systems for Korean, which achieved some adoption by other missionaries.

The dictionary was first published by Kelly & Walsh in Yokohama, Empire of Japan and printed by The Yokohama Bunsha. It originally consisted of two sections: a Korean-English dictionary and a Chinese-English dictionary. The book was originally bound in leather. It was revised and republished three times over time. In its 1911 edition under a different Korean title (한영사전; 韓英辭典), the word order was rearranged, new words were added, and the Chinese portion of the dictionary was deleted. It was reprinted a third time in 1931 in Keijō (Seoul), under a different Korean title (한영대사전; 韓英大辭典).
