= Korean Catholic Bible =

Korean catholicism

- Full name: Holy Bible
- Abbreviation: KCB
- Language: Korean
- Complete Bible published: September 20, 2005
- Publisher: Catholic Bishops' Conference of Korea
- Religious affiliation: Catholic
- Genesis 1:1–3 한처음에 하느님께서 하늘과 땅을 창조하셨다. 땅은 아직 꼴을 갖추지 못하고 비어 있었는데, 어둠이 심연을 덮고 하느님의 영이 그 물 위를 감돌고 있었다. 하느님께서 말씀하시기를 “빛이 생겨라.” 하시자 빛이 생겼다. John 3:16 하느님께서는 세상을 너무나 사랑하신 나머지 외아들을 내주시어, 그를 믿는 사람은 누구나 멸망하지 않고 영원한 생명을 얻게 하셨다.

The Korean Catholic Bible (Korean: 한국 가톨릭 성경; RR: Hangug gatollig seonggyeong) is the Holy Bible (성경; Seonggyeong) translated in Korean language for use of Korean Catholics. This version is the standard Bible for the Roman Catholic Church in Korea since 2005, replacing the Common Translation Bible. The Tetragrammaton for the name of God in the Old Testament is rendered as 야훼 [Yah-whe], instead of traditional rendering 여호와 [Yeo-ho-wa].

== History ==
In 1988, the New Bible Translation Project was constituted by the Catholic Bishop’s Conference of Korea. The new translation begun in 1989 and completed in late 2002. In 2005, the Korean Catholic Bible was released to the public through 17-year efforts which original texts(the Hebrew Bible and Greek Old/New Testaments) are fully translated into modern Korean.

- Texts Sources (OT: Biblia Hebraica Stuttgartensia, Apocrypha: Septuagint, NT: UBS Greek New Testament 4th Edition)

== See also ==
- Bible translations
- Bible translations into Korean
- Christianity in South Korea
- Catholic Church in South Korea
