= Shannon Boyd-Bailey McCune =

American geographer (1913–1993)

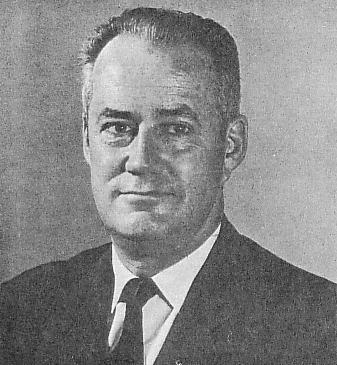
- McCune in 1962
- Born: April 6, 1913; Suncheon, Korea, Empire of Japan
- Died: January 4, 1993 (aged 79); Gainesville, Florida, U.S.
- Education: College of Wooster BA); Syracuse University (MA); Clark University (PhD)
- Relatives: George M. McCune (brother)
- Scientific career
- Fields: Geography, Korean studies
- Institutions: Ohio State University; Colgate University; University of Massachusetts Amherst

Shannon Boyd-Bailey McCune (April 6, 1913 – January 4, 1993) was an American geographer who was the civil administrator of the Ryukyu Islands from 1962 to 1964, the first civilian to hold that office. He was president of the University of Vermont from 1964 to 1966.

== Early life and education ==
Shannon Boyd-Bailey McCune was born in Suncheon, Korea, Empire of Japan, on April 6, 1913, to George Shannon McCune and Helen Bailey McAfee McCune, who were Presbyterian missionaries that came to Korea in 1905. George M. McCune was his brother. He received his elementary and high school education in Korea.

McCune graduated from the College of Wooster with a bachelor's degree in 1935, from Syracuse University with a master of arts in geography in 1937, and from Clark University with a Doctorate of Philosophy in geography in 1939. He was a member of the Sigma Xi and Phi Beta Kappa fraternities.

== Career ==
=== Academic ===
McCune became a teacher at Ohio State University in 1939. He served as the chair of the geography department at Colgate University from 1947 to 1955. From 1955 to 1961, he was the provost of the University of Massachusetts Amherst. He was president of the University of Vermont from 1965 to 1966, when he resigned to do research for UVM in Asia.

McCune was a visiting professor to the University of Tokyo from 1953 to 1954, Soongsil University from 1975 to 1976, and the University of Hawaiʻi at Mānoa in 1976. He worked at the University of Florida as a professor and chair of the geography department before retiring in 1979.

The National Geographical Society of India awarded McCune the Pandit Madan Mohan Malaviya Medal in 1950. Clark University awarded him an honorary Doctor of Law in 1960. From 1967 to 1969, McCune was the director of the American Geographical Society of New York.

McCune authored 139 journal articles and book chapters dealing with the political and economic geography of Asia, international affairs, and higher education.

=== Governance ===
McCune worked for the Foreign Economic Administration in Washington, D.C. from 1942 to 1943, British Raj from 1943 to 1944, British Ceylon in 1944, and China from 1944 to 1945. He was awarded the Presidential Medal of Freedom in 1946, for his work at the Foreign Economic Administration in China. From 1961 to 1962, he worked for UNESCO in Paris. He was an educational consultant for a development mission by the United Nations in Western New Guinea in 1967.

In 1962, McCune became the first civilian to serve as the Civil Administrator of the Ryukyu Islands. He served in the position until 1964. He was present in Seoul for the centennial celebration of the Joseon–United States Treaty of 1882.

== Personal life ==
McCune married Edith Blair, with whom he had three children, in 1936. McCune died in Gainesville, Florida, on January 4, 1993, due to congestive heart failure.

== Bibliography ==
- Korea's Heritage, a Regional and Social Geography (1956)
- Korea: Land of Broken Calm (1966)
- The Ryuku Islands (1975)
- Views of the Geography of Korea, 1935-1960 (1980)

== Works cited ==
=== Journals ===
- Ginsburg, Norton (1994). "Shannon McCune 1913-1993". Annals of the American Association of Geographers. 84 (3). Taylor & Francis: 493–499. doi:10.2307/2563780. JSTOR 2563780.

=== News ===
- Howe, Marvine (January 8, 1993). "Shannon McCune, 79, Educator, Geographer and Asia Expert, Dies". The New York Times. Archived from the original on July 13, 2025.

=== Web ===
- "Distinguished Alumni Award". College of Wooster. Archived from the original on January 4, 2014.
- "Shannon Boyd-Bailey McCune Papers, Shannon McCune Collection" (PDF). University of Hawaiʻi at Mānoa. 2023. Archived (PDF) from the original on December 24, 2024.
- "McCune (Shannon) papers". California Digital Library. Archived from the original on July 13, 2025.
