= ALA-LC romanization for Korean =

Romanization system for Korean

Among the various ALA-LC romanization systems is a romanization system for the Korean language. It was promulgated by and named for the American Library Association (ALA) and Library of Congress (LC). It was first published in 1997. It was significantly revised in 2009 and received a minor revision in 2025. It is based on the McCune–Reischauer (MR) romanization system, which was published in 1939. ALA-LC is meant for use in organizing and retrieving materials in libraries.

== Description ==
ALA-LC follows McCune–Reischauer (MR) except for exceptions listed in its documentation. They are summarized below.

=== General rules ===
- When romanization rules conflict with pronunciation, defer to pronunciation.
- Hyphens are used to separate out generic terms in administrative divisions, except for special administrative districts, such as those of South Korea.
- Sound changes are reflected before and after hyphens, except for when numbers are involved or when abbreviated forms of proper nouns are combined.
- Changes are made to how certain consonants are romanized in various cases.
- Words of Western origin are romanized like normal except for if they begin with "ㄹ"; in which case use either "r" or "l" for that initial "ㄹ" depending on what the Western counterpart does.
- Romanize archaic Hangul following its original spelling, and not by its current pronunciation or spelling.
- Publication titles are rendered in sentence case.
- The interpunct should be rendered either as a comma or hyphen. If appropriate, it can be excluded.
- Brackets used like quotation marks should be transcribed as quotation marks.

=== People names and titles ===
Hyphens are used in two-character Sino-Korean given names (or pseudonyms) of people if those names are preceded by family names. Given names of native Korean origin or that have three or more characters are not hyphenated. Do not capitalize the second particle after the hyphen. Assume the initial "ㄹ" in personal names is always pronounced. Romanize it as "r", except for names of Western origin; in which case use either "r" or "l" depending on what the Western name does.

The family name 이; 리; 李; 異 is always rendered "Yi". Multiple syllable family names are rendered without hyphens. Family names that are a combination of two family names should have a space between those two family names.

Buddhist religious or posthumous names are not hyphenated. Official titles and honorifics (including 씨, with some exceptions) should have a space between them and the rest of the name. Titles and terms of address should be capitalized.

=== Organizations, places, and architectural features ===
Geographical and architectural features (like rivers, mountains, roads, and buildings) should not have a hyphen or space before the generic term at the end. Apply assimilation in the name, even for the generic term.

Company names should have spacing applied, generally between general terms, and each spaced out element should be capitalized.

=== Word division ===
Word divisions are determined by following a set of rules, that in general separate by parts of speech. When in doubt, refer to dictionaries approved by the LC. If still in doubt or if sources differ, prefer to separate.

The rules of ALA-LC for Korean do not account for every instance of romanized text, and subjective variations are possible, particularly on issues of word division. This subjectivity can hurt consistency and thus retrieval of information. Thus, a number of organizations have developed additional tables and lists of common terms in certain spellings. For example, with the 2009 revision of ALA-LC for Korean, the Library of Congress published a spreadsheet of common terms and their standardized romanizations.

=== Standard dictionaries ===
Like MR, the ALA-LC system reflects the pronunciation of words in its spelling. Because pronunciation can vary, the system designates several standard dictionaries as references for pronunciation.

Dictionaries recommended for use in ALA-LC
Purpose	Title	Author/publisher	Additional information
Contemporary South Korean works	Standard Korean Language Dictionary	National Institute of Korean Language	Available online.
Contemporary North Korean works	Chosŏn mal sajŏn (조선 말 사전 [sic])	Kwahak Paekkwa Sajŏn Ch'ulp'ansa (과학 백과 사전 출판사 [sic])	Published in 2004.
Reading and pronouncing Hanja	Tae Han–Han sajŏn (대한한사전; 大漢韓辭典)	Chang Samsik (장삼식; 張三植), Seongmunsa (성문사)	Published in 1964.
Reading and pronouncing Hanja	Sin chajŏn (신 자전; 新字典 [sic])	Sinmun'gwan (신문관)	Originally published in 1915, reprinted in 1973.

=== Automated tools ===
A number of automated tools implement the system. These systems do not automatically account for word division. Two systems are given in the ALA-LC documentation. The first is BIBFRAME ScriptShifter by the Library of Congress. It has two different modes for romanizing Korean: Korean and Korean for people names (with surnames). The second is K-Romanizer. It was developed by Hyoungbae Lee, a Korean studies librarian at Princeton University.

== History and reception ==
McCune–Reischauer (MR) was first published in 1939. According to Reischauer, McCune "persuaded the American Army Map Service to adopt [the MR system], and through the [1950–1953] Korean War it became the foundation for most current Romanizations of Korean place names."

The first official LC guidelines for cataloging Korean-language materials was the 1957 Preliminary Rules and Manual for Cataloging Chinese, Japanese and Korean Materials. MR was adopted for these guidelines. The LC began to catalogue its Korean-language materials the following year. The guidelines were revised in 1967 with the Anglo-American Cataloguing Rules (AACR1) and in 1978 with AACR2. In 1979, the LC, Online Computer Library Center (OCLC), and Research Libraries Group (RLG) began making machine-readable bibliographic records for East Asian materials. In 1987, the OCLC began the CJK (Chinese, Japanese, and Korean) Cataloguing Project. Around this time, the Council on East Asian Libraries (CEAL), particularly via its suborganization the Committee on Korean Materials (CKM), worked on various related projects to cataloguing East Asian materials, such as the Handbook for Korean Studies Librarianship Outside of Korea.

The ALA-LC romanization tables, including that for Korean, were first promulgated in 1997.

ALA-LC romanization for Korean has long been controversial and subject to criticism. In 2006, Kim SungKyung argued that confusion about the system was visible in the many mistakes in its application. The breves used in the system are not reflected in standard keyboards, and are sometimes rendered incorrectly in digitized materials. Scholar Chris Doll wrote in 2017 that many online search engines drop diacritics from search terms, leading to poorer quality results. MR's reflection of pronunciation rules that are not reflected in Hangul itself are explicitly meant for ease of use by non-Koreans. Korean speakers reportedly often find such pronunciation spellings confusing. Scholar Jung-ran Park argued that most users of libraries looking for Korean studies materials will have some familiarity with Korean, making MR less useful to them. Furthermore, the system renders the names of people in a way that most Koreans do not. ALA-LC recommends that all Korean names are written according to its rules and not according to personal preferred spelling. For example, it renders the surname "이" as "Yi", but around 95% of Koreans spell it "Lee".

In 2004, CKM members met with the LC to discuss revisions to the ALA-LC romanization for Korean. LC established a task force to this end. In March 2008, it began applying its revised system, with general use scheduled for October 2009. Joy Kim argued in 2009 that updates were seen as improvements but still inadequate. For example, hyphens were kept in given names despite requests to remove them. In 2007, the Research Libraries Information Network (RLIN) of RLG began merging with the systems of OCLC. The two systems had maintained separate rules around spacing, and they needed to be unified. To this end, CEAL organized a panel on the topic in 2008.

In 2000, the government of South Korea promulgated its Revised Romanization system, which has since become widely adopted in South Korea. Whether libraries should adopt this system instead is a subject of debate. Scholar Joy Kim argued that, while the system has features that make it appealing to Koreans, it is inadequate for use by librarians. Namely, it allows for flexibility (particularly in word divisions) in ways that are ill-suited for use in libraries. In 2017, Doll advocated for switching to RR. Doll argued that the LC had previously lagged behind the rest of the world in adopting the pinyin romanization system for Chinese, although it did eventually switch over beginning in 1997, as fewer and fewer people could use the previous system, Wade–Giles.
