= George M. McCune =

American linguist (1908–1948)

George McAfee McCune
- Born: June 16, 1908; Pyongyang, Korean Empire
- Died: November 5, 1948 (aged 40); Berkeley, California, United States
- Education: University of California, Berkeley (PhD); Occidental College (Bachelors, Masters)
- Occupation: Linguist
- Known for: McCune–Reischauer system of romanization of Korean

George McAfee "Mac" McCune (/məˈkjuːn/ mə-KEWN; June 16, 1908 – November 5, 1948) was an American scholar of Korea. He was one of the creators and namesakes of the McCune–Reischauer system for the romanization of Korean, along with Edwin O. Reischauer. Significant work on the system was done by Korean linguists Choe Hyeon-bae, Jeong In-seop, and Kim Seon-gi. McCune taught Korean history and language at Occidental College and the University of California, Berkeley.

== Early life and education ==
Born in Pyongyang, Imperial Korea, George McAfee McCune was the son of Helen McAfee and George Shannon McCune, American Presbyterian educational missionaries who had sailed to the country in 1905. Korea was annexed by Japan in 1910.

The McCunes worked in Pyongyang and Sinch'ŏn. The young George had a younger brother, Shannon, and two sisters, Catherine and Margaret. They received their elementary educations in Korea.

McCune moved to the United States to attend Huron College in South Dakota, where his father was president, and after a year transferred to Rutgers University in New Jersey. He graduated from Occidental College with a bachelor's degree in 1930. McCune returned to Korea for a few years, and taught at Union Christian College in Pyongyang, where his parents were working. He also owned and managed Taeon, a formerly Chinese-owned business, which enabled him to finance his graduate education.

McCune returned to the US and completed his MA at Occidental College in 1935. He started doctoral work at the University of California, Berkeley. He was granted a Mills Traveling Fellowship to continue his studies in Korea. He spent a year working on the official Yi dynasty chronicles in connection with his dissertation. In 1941, he received his PhD from Berkeley.

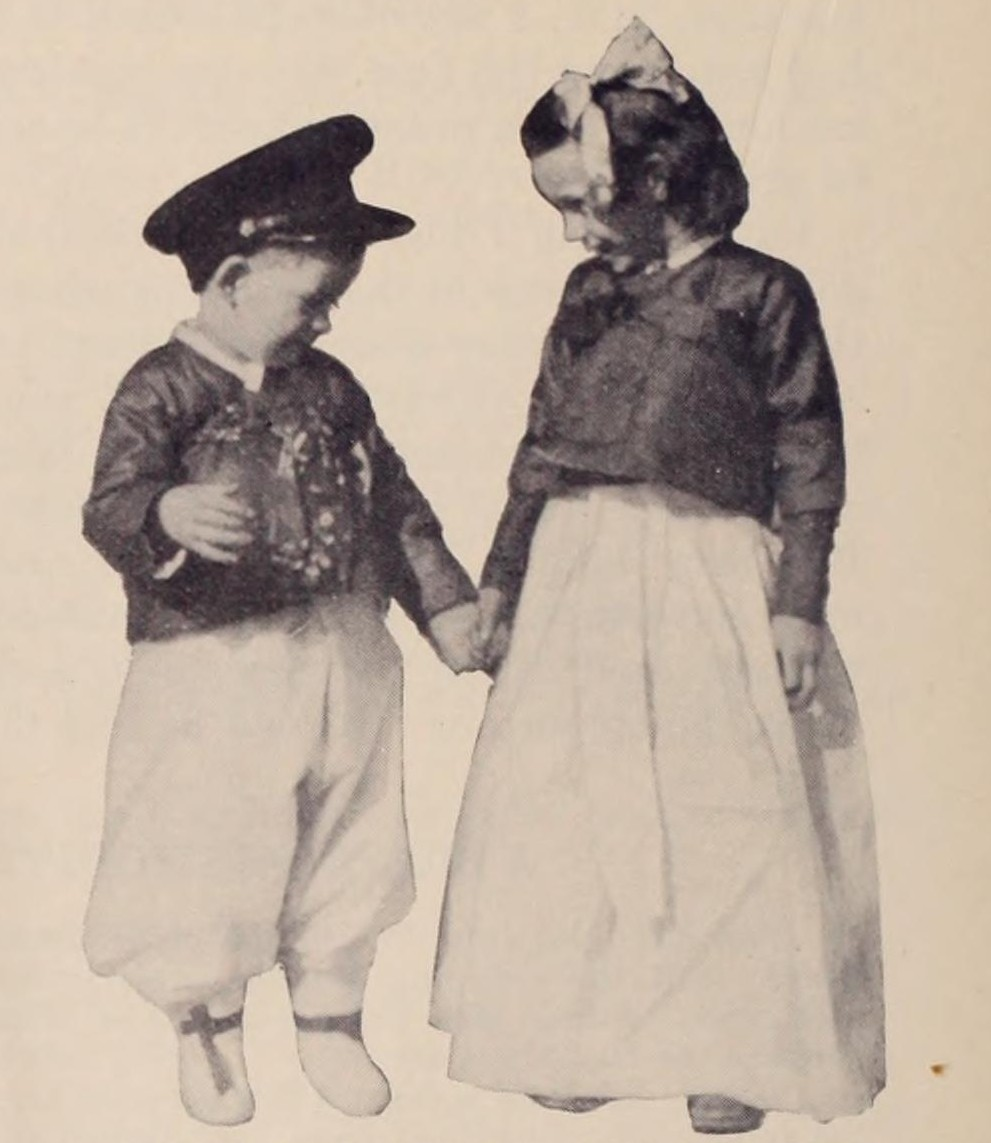
George M. McCune dressed in Korean clothing alongside his sister Anna, 1915

In 1939, he and Edwin O. Reischauer, also an East Asian scholar, published their McCune–Reischauer romanization of the Korean language, which was widely used for decades.

== Marriage and family ==
He married Evelyn Margaret Becker (1907-2012) in Honolulu, Hawaii, on April 22, 1933. She was a child of American Methodist missionary parents and also had been born in Pyongyang. They had met there while both were visiting their respective families. She was teaching at the Seoul Foreign School in Seoul, Korea, after getting her BA at University of California, Berkeley.

They became engaged and then married during a crisis because of McCune's health problems; his heart had been weakened by the rheumatic fever that he suffered from as a child.

== Career ==
McCune began teaching Korean language and history at Occidental College, where he taught from 1939 to 1946, advancing from the rank of Instructor to Associate Professor.

Soon after the Japanese attack on Pearl Harbor, the United States entered World War II. In 1942, McCune was given a leave of absence to serve the war effort. He worked as a Social Science Analyst in the Office of Strategic Services (OSS), the precursor to the Central Intelligence Agency (CIA). After serving in the OSS for two years and briefly on the Board of Economic Warfare, McCune was appointed as officer of the Korea Desk in the State Department. During those years, he was "generally recognized as the government's leading expert on Korean affairs."

In 1946, he began teaching at UC, Berkeley. In 1948, he was promoted to associate professor of history at Berkeley, but he died that year because of heart problems.

At Berkeley, he had helped establish an intensive course in the Korean language in the Far Eastern and Russian Language School of the University Extension. In addition, he acquired for the East Asiatic Library several hundred volumes in the Korean language: "These constitute one of the first such collections in this country."

"He was a member of the Far Eastern Association, the Foreign Policy Association, the American Historical Association, the Council on Foreign Relations, the Institute of Pacific Relations, the American Association of University Professors and the World Affairs Institute. In 1947 he was appointed a member of the Advisory Editorial Board of the Far Eastern Quarterly and in the same year was a delegate to the National Conference of the Institute of Pacific Relations, at Coronado, California."

His brother, Shannon Boyd-Bailey McCune (1913–1993), became a geographer and wrote several books about Korea for the general public.
