= Bo-ram =

- Hangul: 보람
- RR: Boram
- MR: Poram

Bo-ram, also spelled Bo-lam, is a Korean given name. The word itself is a native Korean word meaning "valuable" or "worthwhile" and does not have corresponding hanja. However, since Korean given names can be created arbitrarily, it may also be a name with hanja (e.g. 寶濫). According to a 2010 study by Chosun University professor Kang Hui-suk, it was the sixth-most common given name among women who graduated from the university that year.

People with this name include:

- Jeon Boram (born 1986), South Korean singer and actress
- Hwang Bo-ram (born 1987), South Korean football player
- Lee Bo-ram (born 1987), South Korean singer and actress
- Park Bo-ram (1994–2024), South Korean singer
- Park Bo-ram (director), South Korean television director

== See also ==
- List of Korean given names
