= John Ross (missionary) =

Scottish Presbyterian missionary in China, translated the Bible to Korean (1842–1915)

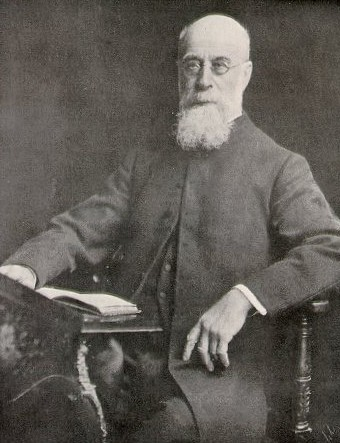
Photo of John Ross

John Ross (1842–1915), (his Chinese name: Chinese: 羅約翰) was a Scottish Presbyterian missionary to Northeast China who established Dongguan Church in Shenyang. He is also known for translating the first Korean Bible and being the first to introduce spacing to Korean punctuation.

== Life ==
John Ross was born at Rarichie in Easter Ross, where Scottish Gaelic was his native language. He received his education at Fearn School, University of Glasgow and Theological Hall, Edinburgh. In 1872 he was sent by the Scottish United Presbyterian Mission (Chinese: 蘇格蘭長老會差會) to Northeast China, known at that time as Manchuria. John Ross, called in Chinese: 羅約翰, went first to Yingkou, then moved to Mukden (the present-day Shenyang) and established a church there in 1889. This church was called Dongguan Church (East Gate Church) because it was built just outside East Gate, as Christian churches were not allowed within the city wall. It was rebuilt after the Boxer Rebellion, and is now still used as a Protestant church. He also started a mission in Fushun.

While in China, John Ross met traders from Korea one day and decided to make a Korean translation of the New Testament, which was completed in 1887 and brought to Korea. This was the first Korean version In 1892 he was visited from Korea by James Scarth Gale.

Ross returned to Scotland in 1910, but continued to help the Scotland-China Society. He died in Edinburgh in 1915. He is buried there mid-way along the east side of the main north-south path in Newington Cemetery. There is a plaque commemorating John Ross on the seafront at Balintore in Easter Ross.

== Family ==
He was first married to Mary Anne Stewart, who died in Manchuria on March 31st, 1873, some time after giving birth to their son (Drummond Stewart Ross). In February 1881 he remarried Isabella Strapp McFadyen (d.1930).

== Recognition ==
In 1877, John Gilbert Baker named Iris rossii in his honour. Ray Desmond (Editor).

== Works ==
- Corean primer: being lessons in Corean on all ordinary subjects, transliterated on the principles of the "Mandarin primer", by the same author (1877)
- The Manchus, or The reigning dynasty of China: their rise and progress (1891)
- History of Corea, Ancient and Modern; with Description of Manners and Customs, Language and Geography (1891)

== See also ==
- Christianity in China
- Christianity in Korea
- Korean Bible
- Scottish United Presbyterian Mission
- Seo Sang-ryun
