= James Scarth Gale =

Canadian missionary (1863–1937)

- Born: February 19, 1863; Alma, Ontario, Canada
- Died: January 31, 1937 (aged 73); Bath, England
- Education: University of Toronto
- Known for: Early missionary in Korea, translating the Bible to Korean

James S. Gale (February 19, 1863 – January 31, 1937) was a Canadian Presbyterian missionary, educator and Bible translator in Korea.

In old Sino-Korean, he was known as Ki Il (Korean: 기일; Hanja: 奇一).

== Early life ==
Gale was born on February 19, 1863, in Alma, Ontario, Canada. His father John Gale was a Scottish immigrant who moved to Canada in 1832. His Pennsylvania Dutch mother Miami Bradt was from Hamilton, Ontario. Together they had six children, of which James was the fifth.

In 1882 Gale entered St. Catharine's Collegiate Institute, St. Catharines, Ontario. From 1884 to 1888 Gale studied arts at the University of Toronto, including the summer of 1886 at the Collège de France, Paris on a language course. During his first year of study he heard Dwight L. Moody preach and was deeply impressed. Gale graduated with a B.A. from the University College of the University of Toronto in 1898.

== Career ==
After graduation, on April 12, 1888, he was appointed a missionary of Toronto University's YMCA and was sent to Korea. On November 13, 1888, he set sail from Vancouver, arriving in Pusan on 12 December, from where he took a coastal vessel to Jemulpo, present-day Incheon.

In 1889 he visited Haeju, in Hwanghae province and from there moved to Sollae (often called Sorae) village, in Jangyeon District, Hwanghae from March to June. This village was home to Seo Sang-ryun, one of the first Korean Protestants and his brother, who had been baptized by Horace Grant Underwood. From August 1889 to May 1890 he lived in Pusan. In 1890 he taught English at the "Christian School" (예수교 학당). In February 1891 he and Samuel A. Moffet visited John Ross (who had first attempted to translate the Bible into Korean) in Mukden, Manchuria and returned to Seoul in June.

In August 1891, terminating the relationship with the Toronto University YMCA, he moved to the American Presbyterian Mission Board, North. From 1892 to 1897 the Gales lived in Wonsan while Gale served as member of the "Board of Official Translators" of the Korean Bible. He worked with Henry G. Appenzeller, Horace G. Underwood, William B. Scranton, and William D. Reynolds.

In 1897 he returned to Canada and the US, and on May 13 was ordained as a Presbyterian minister at New Albany Presbytery, Indiana. In 1900 he became the first minister of Yondong Presbyterian Church (연동교회) in Seoul.

As an educationalist, he founded the Jesus Church Middle School, present Kongsin Middle and High School, as well as Yondong Girls' School, presently Chongsin Girls' School, in Seoul. He was also a professor of Pyongyang Theological Seminary. In 1904 he organized the Association of Korean Education with the members of the Yondong Church. In 1917 he founded the Korean Music Society.

In May 1927 he resigned as pastor of Yondong Church, leaving Korea on June 22, a year before official retirement (he officially retired from mission work on August 31, 1928). Gale died on January 31, 1937, at the age of 74 in Bath, England. He is buried in Lansdown Cemetery, Bath.

== Personal life ==
He married twice. On April 7, 1892, he married Harriet E. Gibson Heron, the widow of John W. Heron, M.D., also of the American Presbyterian Mission, North, who had died in Korea on June 26, 1890. Harriet Gale died on March 29, 1908, aged 48. On April 7, 1910, he was remarried to Ada Louisa Sale (born in Cheshire, England, 1871). Her father, George Sale, was a businessman in Japan.

== Legacy ==
His linguistic skills were essential in the work of Bible translation. He was unable to publish a considerable portion of what he wrote or translated and much remains to be published in his papers in the University of Toronto.

- Gale commenced work as part of Henry G. Appenzeller's Bible translation team in 1892 and worked on part of Gospel of Matthew and Ephesians, then the Book of Acts (1893) and Gospel of John (1895) Gale's work has considerable influence on all following Korean versions.
- In 1890 Gale worked with Horace G. Underwood on A Concise Dictionary of the Korean Language, a small booklet. His own A Korean-English Dictionary appeared in 1897. A Korean-English Dictionary followed in 1914.
- In 1893 he was also the translator of the first work of Western literature to be printed in the Korean hangul script, Pilgrim's Progress by John Bunyan (in Korean 천로역정).
- Gale translated some pages of ancient Korean history from the Dongguk Tonggam publishing them in the monthly magazine Korean Repository between 1893 and 1896. He also translated (for the first time) a number of sijo poems, publishing them in the same magazine
- In 1897 Gale published the book Korean Sketches (Chicago: Fleming H. Revell), a collection of often amusing essays about daily life in Korea, some previously published in the Repository.
- In 1899 Gale became correspondent for "North China Daily News" of Shanghai, China. He was also editor "Kurisdo Sinmun" (Christian News)1905 and "Yesukyo Sinbo" (Christian Herald) 1907.
- In 1900 the first Mrs. Gale, who was suffering from tuberculosis, went to Switzerland with her daughters, where they remained for six years.
- In 1900 Gale founded Yeondong Church in Seoul, where he remained as pastor until he left Korea. In the same year, he was one of the founding members of the Royal Asiatic Society Korea Branch, of which he became Corresponding Secretary, and on October 24 he presented the first paper, on "The Influence of China upon Korea." Later, in 1915, he served as the Society's president.
- In 1903 Gale travelled via the Trans-Siberian Railway to Switzerland, where he spent six months. At this time he wrote and published his only work of fiction, the novel The Vanguard (New York: Fleming H. Revell).
- 1909, a year before Korea was annexed by Japan, Gale published Korea in Transition which focusses mainly on the changes in Korean society introduced by the work of the Protestant missions.
- In 1917 Gale established the monthly Korea Magazine (published in English). He was its editor and almost its only contributor. The magazine ceased publication in April 1919, amidst the Japanese crackdown after the March 1 Independence Movement.

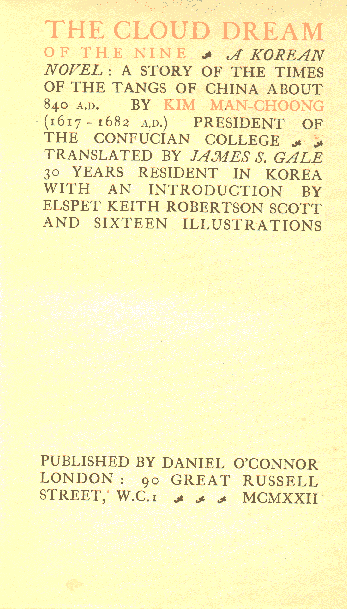
The title page of Gale's translation

- 1922 Gale published the first literary work of Korean to be translated into English The Cloud Dream of the Nine (구운몽,九雲夢) by Kim Manjung (김만중) 1637–1692.
- Disagreeing with some of the over-literal translations in the official version of the Bible, in 1925 he published his own private translation of New and Old Testaments.
- In 1924–1926 Gale wrote his History of the Korean People, publishing it in installments in The Korea Mission Field. This was a much more personal and poetic vision of Korean history than the scholarly History published by Homer Hulbert nearly two decades before.
- Among the many institutions Gale founded or was involved in founding, in 1903 Gale was one of the founding members of the Hansong Young Men's Christian Association, presently the Korean YMCA and was elected as its first president.
- In memory of Gale's achievements, the Centre for the Study of Korea (CSK) at the University of Toronto hosts the annual James Scarth Gale translation prize for non-fiction pieces of writing on Korea. The top prize-winner is awarded a sum of $2,500.

== Korean mythological origins ==
James Scarth Gale said that Koreans claimed to be descended from the gods with slight admixture from Chinese.
