= Yuguang Street Church =

Protestant church in Dalian, China

Coordinates: 38.91988°N 121.64290°E

Yuguang Street Church (simplified Chinese: 玉光街礼拜堂; traditional Chinese: 玉光街禮拜堂) is a Protestant church in Dalian, Liaoning, China. It is the former Dalian Anglican Church (traditional Chinese: 大連聖公會教堂; simplified Chinese: 大连圣公会教堂; Japanese: 大連聖公会教会) and the building is a Historical Protected Building of Dalian City. The building is to the west of the Zhongshan Square.

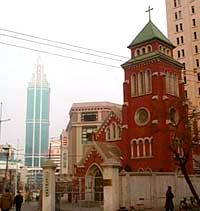
The church with Zhongshan Square and Dalian World Trade Center Building in the background

== Brief history ==
In the early 20th century an Anglican church was built on the premises of the British consulate in Dalian. In 1928 the second-generation church building was built by a joint effort of the Church of England and the Anglican-Episcopal Church of Japan. It was named Dalian Anglican Church. Services were held in English and Japanese. The church belonged to the North China Diocese of the Anglican-Episcopal Province of China.

At the end of the Second World War, all Japanese-owned buildings were confiscated by the Chinese. As Britain owned half of the church, it was left as a Christian church and was renamed "Yuguang Street Church". During the Cultural Revolution of 1966-1977 when all religious activities were suppressed, the stained glass windows were smashed broken and the church was used as a place for children's activities.

As Christian services restarted in the early 1980s, the church came under the post-denominational China Christian Council. It came under the control of the Dalian Three-Self Patriotic Movement (TSPM) in 1986.

In 2001, it was listed as one of Dalian City's 100 or so Protected Historical Buildings. It is still listed as such in 2026.

== Cornerstone ==
The cornerstone to the right of the church entrance says in English (on the left side) and Japanese (on the right, written vertically): "To the glory of God this stone was dedicated May 6th 1928 by Francis Lushington Norris D.D. bishop in north China".

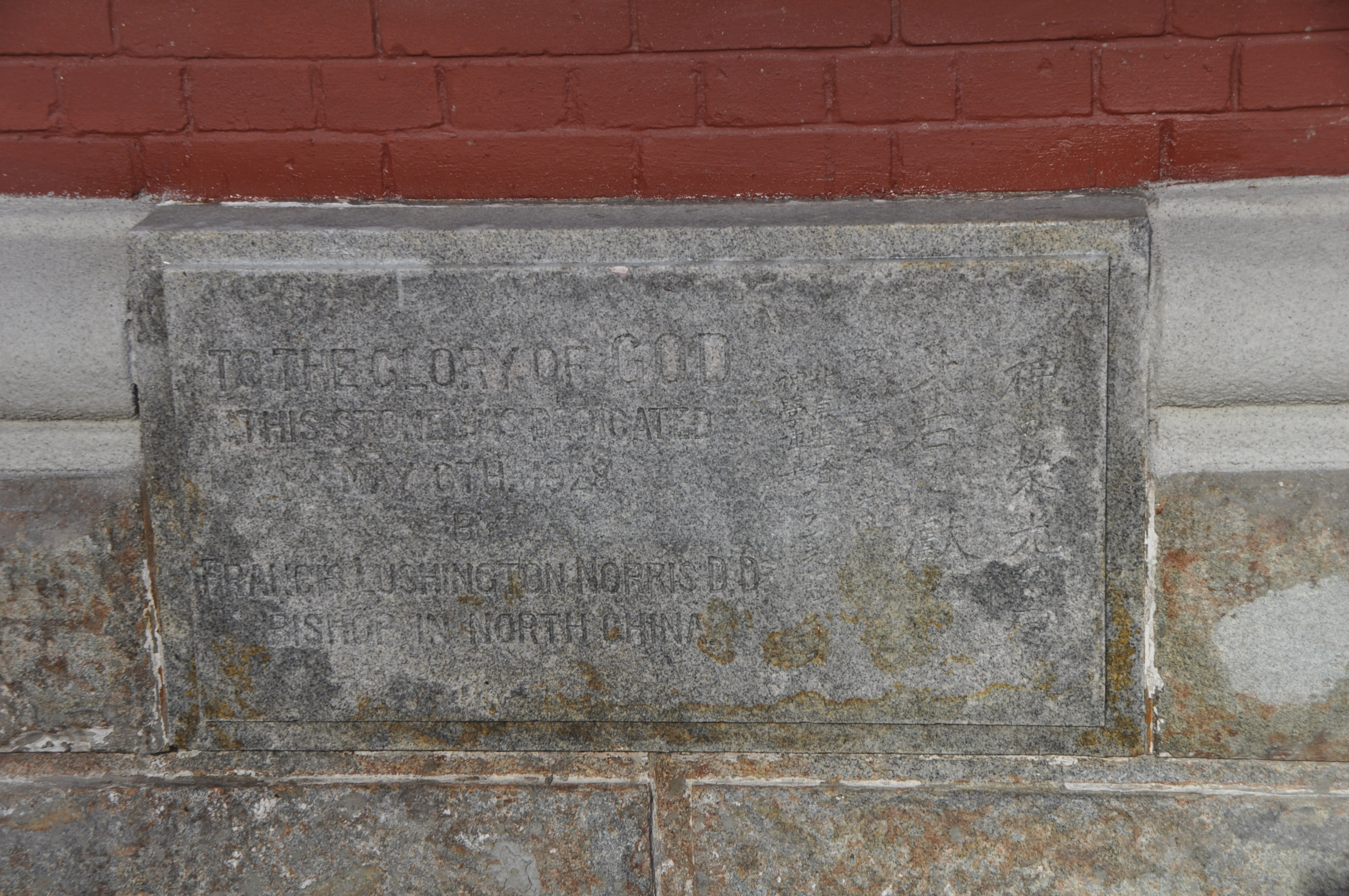
Cornerstone

== See also ==
- Protestantism in China
