= ALA-LC romanization =

American set of romanization standards

ALA-LC (American Library Association – Library of Congress) is a set of standards for romanization, the representation of text in other writing systems using the Latin script.

== Applications ==
The system is used to represent bibliographic information by North American libraries and the British Library (for acquisitions since 1975) and in publications throughout the English-speaking world.

The Anglo-American Cataloguing Rules require catalogers to romanize access points from their non-Roman originals. However, as the MARC standards have been expanded to allow records containing Unicode characters, many cataloguers now include bibliographic data in both Roman and original scripts. The emerging Resource Description and Access continues many of AACR's recommendations but refers to the process as "transliteration" rather than "Romanization."

== Scripts ==
The ALA-LC Romanization includes over 70 romanization tables. Here are some examples of tables:

- A Cherokee Romanization table was created by the LC and ALA in 2012 and subsequently approved by the Cherokee Tri-Council meeting in Cherokee, North Carolina. It was the first ALA-LC Romanization table for a Native American syllabary.
- The Chinese Romanization table used the Wade–Giles transliteration system until 1997, when the Library of Congress (LC) announced a decision to switch to the Pinyin system.
- ALA-LC romanization for Korean
- ALA-LC romanization for Russian

== See also ==
- Devanagari transliteration
- Romanization of Arabic
- Romanization of Armenian
- Romanization of Belarusian
- Romanization of Bulgarian
- Romanization of Khmer
- Romanization of Georgian
- Romanization of Persian
- Romanization of Ukrainian
- Romanization of Urdu
