= Dongguan Church =

Protestant church in China

Coordinates: 41.7986°N 123.4658°E

Donguang Church (Chinese: 東關教會), located in Shenyang, Liaoning Province, China, is one of the largest and oldest Protestant churches in Northeast China. It is also known as the cradle of Christianity of the Koreans in China and in the Korean Peninsula.

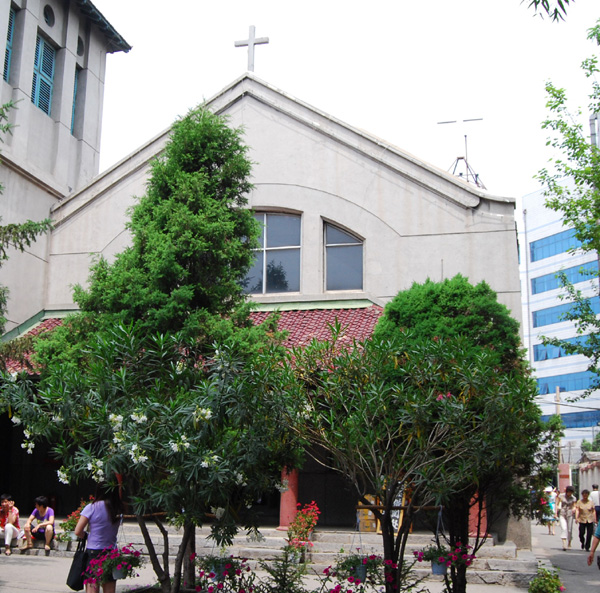
Dongguan Church, Shenyang, China

== General ==
Donguan Church, built in the second half of the 19th century, is located in Shenyang, Liaoning Province, China. It is one of the largest and oldest Protestant churches in Northeast China. It was so named because it was built just outside East Gate, also called Dongguan (East Barrier), as a church was not allowed within the city wall.

John Ross (his Chinese name: Chinese: 羅約翰), sent by the United Presbyterian Church, Scotland, to Manchuria, went first to Yingkou, then moved to Mukden (Shenyang) and established a church here in 1889. This church building was destroyed during the Boxer Rebellion in 1900, but was reconstructed in 1907. It was damaged during the Cultural Revolution, yet enlarged in 1992. An Annex was built in 1998. The centennial of the 1907 church building dedication was celebrated in 2007.

Today, Christian worship is held in the main Church building and, on Sundays (7:00, 9:00 and 11:00 am), relayed also to the 5-storey Annex building behind, by cable TV. On the right of the main building is John Ross Memorial Hall, which is also open to the public.

== First Korean Bible translation ==
While in China, John Ross met traders from Korea one day, and decided to get a Korean translation of the New Testament Bible, which was completed in 1887 and brought to Korea.

== See also ==
- Christianity in China
- Christianity in Korea
- Korean Bible translation
- Xita Church
