= V. A. Smirnov =

V. A. Smirnov may refer to:

- Vasily Smirnov (writer) (Vasily Alexandrovich Smirnov, 1904/1905–1979), Soviet writer
- Vladimir Aleksandrovich Smirnov (1932–1996), Russian philosopher
- Vasily Smirnov (serial killer) (Vasily Alexandrovich Smirnov, 1947–1980), Soviet serial killer and criminal
- Vladimir Alexeyevich Smirnov (born 1957), Russian scientist and businessman
- Vladimir Anatolyevich Smirnov (born 1977), Russian footballer

== See also ==
- Wladimir Smirnoff (1917–2000), also known as Vladimir A. Smirnoff, Soviet-born Canadian entomologist
- Vasily Smirnov (disambiguation)
- Vladimir Smirnov (disambiguation)
- Smirnov (disambiguation)
