= Sergey Smirnov =

Sergey Smirnov may refer to:

- Sergei Smirnov (intelligence officer) (born 1950), Russian KGB/FSB official
- Sergei Smirnov (footballer) (born 1981), Russian footballer
- Sergey Smirnov (geologist) (1895–1947), Russian geologist
- Sergey Smirnov (writer) (1915–1976), Russian writer
- Sergey Smirnov (artist) (1953–2006), Russian artist
- Sergey Smirnov (shot putter) (born 1960), Soviet shot putter
- Sergei Smirnov (figure skater), Russian former pair skater
- Sergey Smirnov (rower) (born 1961), Soviet Olympic rower
- Sergey Smirnov (journalist) (born 1975), Russian journalist, editor-in-chief, Mediazona
- Sergei Smirnov, a fictional character in the anime series, Mobile Suit Gundam 00

== See also ==
- Smirnov
- Smirnoff (surname)
