= Boris Smirnov =

Boris Smirnov may refer to:

- Boris Alexandrovich Smirnov (actor) (1908–1982), Soviet actor in the film Zhukovsky
- Boris Smirnov-Rusetsky (1905–1993), Russian painter
- Boris Smirnov (ethnologist) (1924–1979), Russian ethnologist

== See also ==
- Smirnov (surname)
- Smirnoff (surname)
