= Russian Spiritual Mission in Beijing =

Religious mission

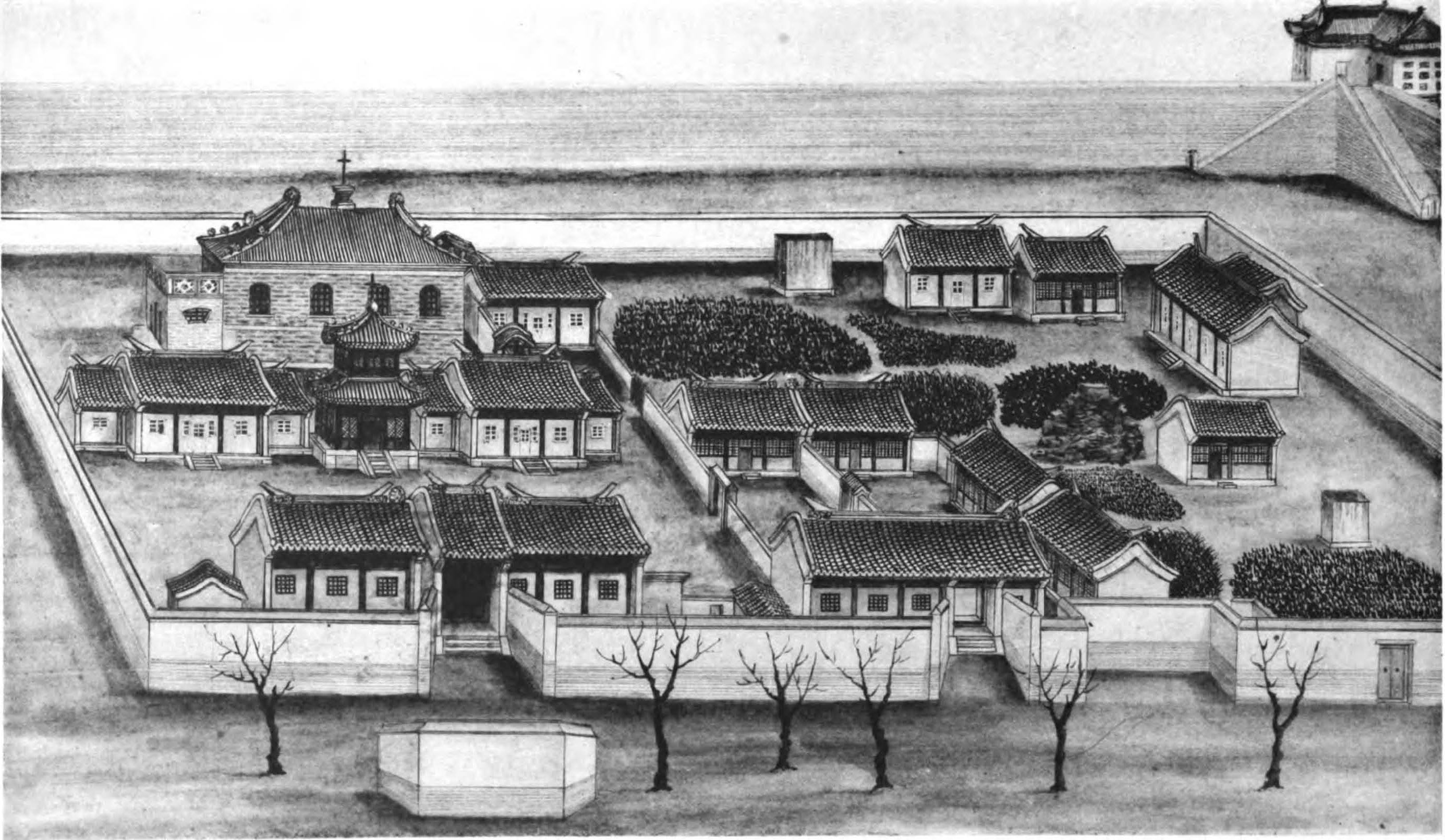
View of the Northern Compound of the Russian Orthodox Mission in Beijing, 1805.

The Russian Spiritual Mission in Beijing was a religious and political representation of the Russian Orthodox Church and the Russian Empire that operated in Beijing from the 17th to the 20th centuries.

The Mission's activities were organized in alignment with Russian domestic and foreign policy interests. It played a significant role in establishing and maintaining Russian-Chinese relations, served as a center for the scholarly study of China, and trained Russia's first sinologists. Due to the absence of formal diplomatic relations between the two states, mission members often served as unofficial representatives of the Russian government in the Qing Empire.

== Albazinians ==
In the 17th century, Russia began exploring Eastern Siberia and first encountered China. Early contacts were marked by border conflicts, the most significant being the Qing army's capture of the Russian fortress Albazino on the Amur River in 1685. Forty-five Cossacks were taken as prisoners and resettled in Beijing, marking the start of a long Russian presence in China. While the Chinese referred to them as Russians, the group likely included baptized Buryats, Kalmyks, and descendants of mixed marriages.

The Albazinians were settled in Beijing's Inner City near the Dongzhimen gate. The Manchu Emperor Kangxi enrolled them into the prestigious military caste of the Qing Empire, assigning them to the "Russian Company" of the imperial guard's yellow-bordered banner, receiving state-provided housing, funds for initial settlement, land allotments. A Buddhist temple, Guandi Temple (dedicated to the God of War) was granted to them for worship. The first Orthodox priest in China, Maxim Leontyev, converted it into a chapel in honor to Nicholas the Wonderworker, where he led services until 1695.

Upon learning of Father Maxim's efforts to preserve Orthodoxy among the Albazinians, the Russian government requested the Chinese emperor to release the prisoners or allow them to build a church in Beijing. In 1696, Father Maxim, with Russian clergy, consecrated a church dedicated to Saint Sophia, though it was commonly called the Nicholas Church after the icon of Saint Nicholas.

== Orthodox Mission in the 18th Century ==
Peter I's decree of June 18, 1700, tasked the Tobolsk metropolitan with baptizing as many Chinese as possible, whose piety and worldly success were meant to persuade the Qing emperor to adopt Orthodoxy. It raised the idea of establishing a spiritual mission in Beijing. It was the first government directive addressing the Russian Orthodox Church's mission in China, emphasizing the need for Russian subjects to study local languages, customs, and culture to effectively preach Orthodoxy, aligning with Russia's political and trade interests in the Qing Empire. Thus, the Russian Orthodox Mission in Beijing was intended to be a center for both Orthodoxy and Russian academic researches on China.

After the father Maxim's death in 1712 and there was a request for a new priest accelerated the mission's organization. In 1714, Archimandrite Ilarion (Lezhaysky) was sent to Beijing with icons, church utensils, liturgical books, and a mitre. In 1716, the mission arrived in the Qing Empire, where its members were warmly received and enrolled in imperial service. They were provided state housing near the Albazinian church and temporary allowances. In addition to a one-time grant from the Board of Foreign Affairs (Lifanyuan), they received monthly salaries. The Manchu government treated the missionaries as it did Chinese subjects, as they served the spiritual needs of the Qing guard's Russian Company, composed of Albazinian captives and other Russians in the Qing Empire. In Russia, the mission was placed under the jurisdiction of the Siberian metropolitans, based in Tobolsk.

The Second Mission was granted a prestigious location in central Beijing at the ambassadorial compound, near the imperial city, government offices, and commercial streets, previously reserved for vassal princes. With Qing government funding, a stone church dedicated to the Presentation of the Lord was built at the Southern Compound (Nanguan), distinct from the Northern Compound (Beiguan) where Albazinians lived. The church, constructed using traditional Chinese techniques, housed the Saint Nicholas icon and served Russian trade caravans visiting Beijing. It withstood the 1730 Beijing earthquake, which killed around 75,000 people in Beijing and destroyed many buildings, including the original Albazinian chapel. A new church dedicated to the Dormition of the Theotokos was later built on its site.

After Peter I's death, Russian missionaries did not actively spread Orthodoxy among Chinese or Manchus, neither took part in court intrigues. The mission focused on maintaining the faith among Albazinians, fulfilling Russian government diplomatic tasks, and supporting trade caravans. Its students studied Chinese and Manchu. Due to these characteristics, Qing authorities treated the mission leniently, sparing it from persecutions faced by other Christian groups.

Since the 1760s, restrictions on Russian trade caravans and intermittent halts in Russo-Qing border trade reduced Russian merchant visits to China. Russian envoys also failed to secure Qing permission for a secular diplomatic mission in Beijing. Consequently, the spiritual mission effectively became Russia's diplomatic mission and the primary reliable source of information on Qing affairs.

== Orthodox Mission in the 19th Century – Cradle of Russian Sinology ==
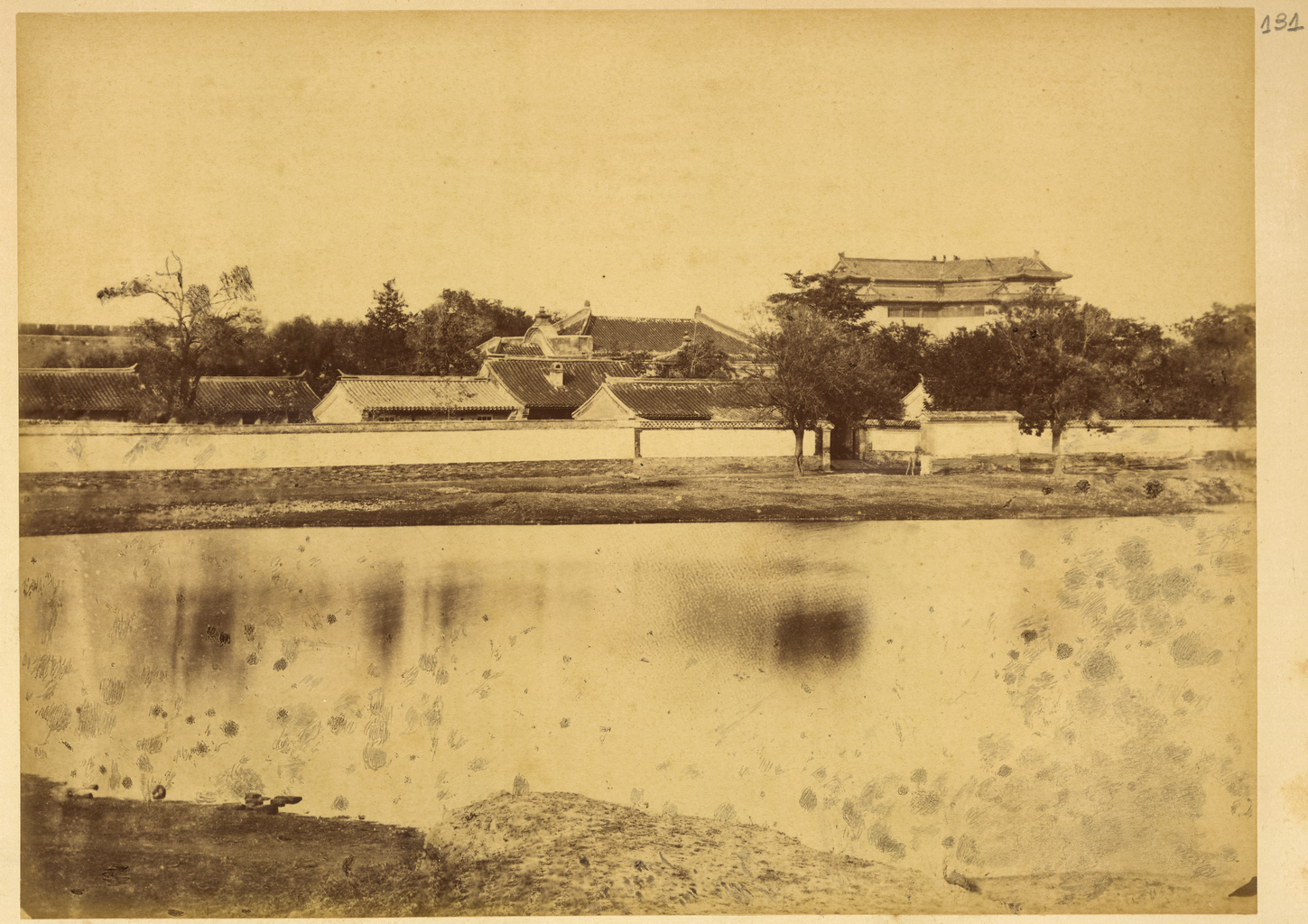
Russian Orthodox Mission in northeast Beijing, 1874. The mission was destroyed in 1900 during the Boxer Uprising.

The mission's members had to study Manchu, Chinese, and Mongolian, as well as China's history, culture, and religion. Secular members included young students from higher education institutions and the Theological Academy, assigned studies in medicine, mathematics, literature, philosophy, Confucian systems, history, geography, statistics, and Chinese jurisprudence based on their skills and interests. The Beijing Mission produced Russia's first prominent sinologists: I. K. Rossokhin (1707–1761), A. L. Leontyev (1716–1786), I. Ya. Bichurin (1777–1853), O. M. Kovalevsky (1800–1878), I. P. Voytsekhovsky (1793–1850), I. I. Zakharov (1814–1885), P. I. Kafarov (1817–1878), and V. P. Vasilyev (1818–1900). Their scholarly legacy remains a treasure of Russian sinology. For instance, Archimandrite Hyacinth (Bichurin), head of the ninth mission, authored a description of Beijing that became the foundation for subsequent European guidebooks to the Qing capital.

Bichurin led the o mission from 1807 to 1821, one of the most distinguished in the mission's history. While its missionary work was limited, Bichurin and his students left a significant mark on global sinology. Bichurin quickly mastered Chinese, formed extensive connections, and gained invaluable insight into Chinese customs. His 14 years in Beijing prepared him for his scholarly and literary career, producing works on Chinese geography, history, literature, and neighboring countries, as well as dictionaries. His contributions were recognized by the Russian Academy of Sciences and the Asiatic Society of Paris.

According to J. Y. Wong (1998), in the 1850s, the mission's religious activities served as a cover for diplomatic functions.

== Orthodox Mission After the Opium Wars ==
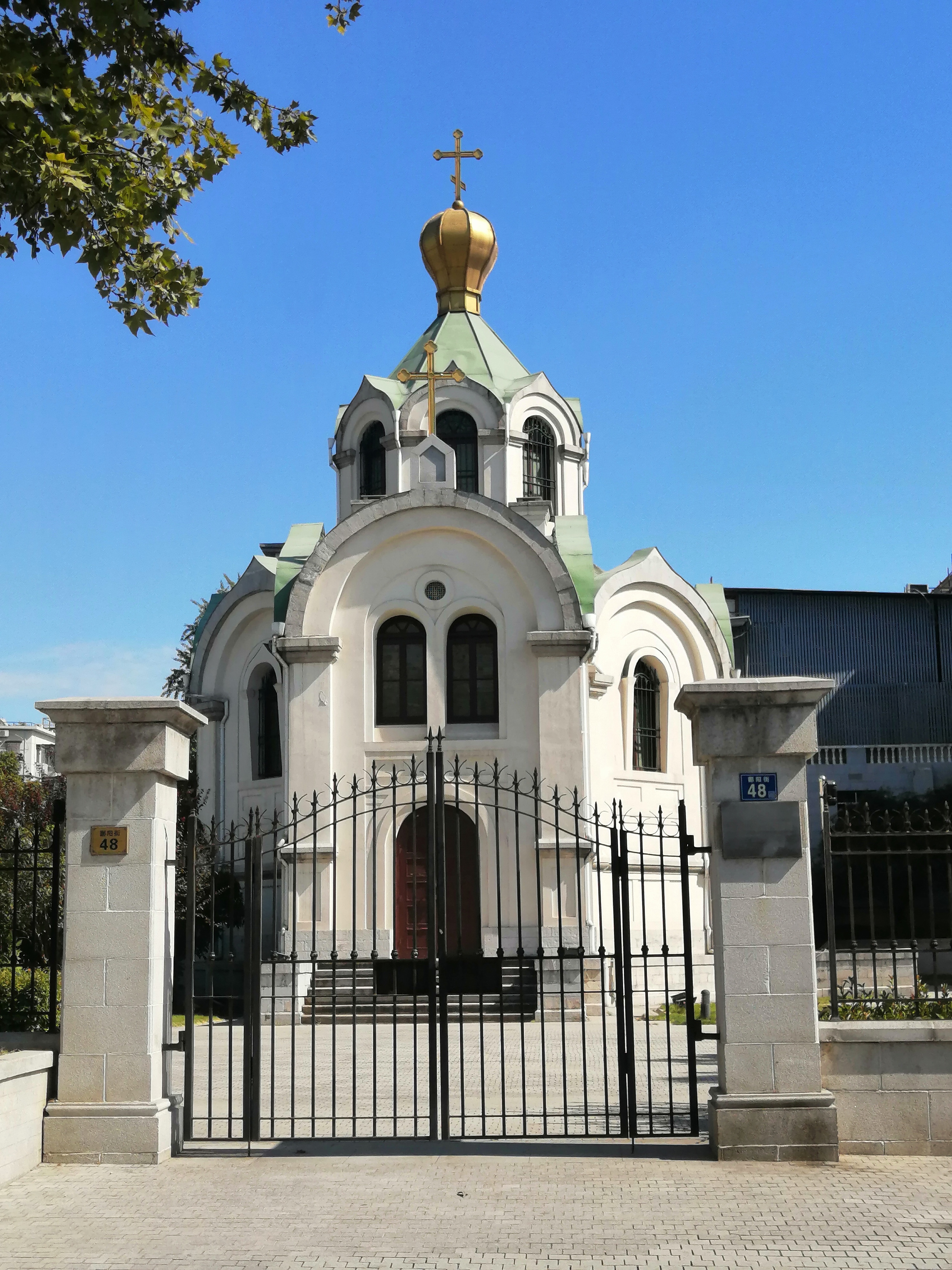
Hankou: Former Russian church (1876)

Russia did not participate directly in the Opium Wars against China and, after the Crimean War, remained at odds with Britain and France, the wars' victors, while sympathizing with the anti-British Sepoy Rebellion. However, Russian diplomats leveraged the threat of invasion during the Christian Taiping Rebellion to secure vast territories claimed by the Manchus(Transbaikal, Khabarovsk Krai, Primorsky Krai, Sakhalin, etc.) through the Treaty of Aigun (1858), the Treaties of Tianjin, and the Convention of Peking (1860). Following these treaties, Western states, including Russia, established diplomatic missions in Beijing. In 1861, Russia's first permanent envoy, L. F. Balluzek, arrived, and the Russian diplomatic mission was established, taking over the spiritual mission's diplomatic and educational roles. The spiritual mission became solely religious, transitioning from the Ministry of Foreign Affairs to ecclesiastical oversight, with its staff reduced.

The Qing government, recognizing Christianity's role in fostering order, pledged not to persecute its Christian subjects. This policy enabled the mission to expand religious activities, preaching Orthodoxy among Chinese. Many liturgical books were translated and published in Chinese, often used by Protestants, contributing to 75 million of China's 105.4 million Christians being Protestant today. Russian concessions were opened in Tianjin, Fuzhou, and Hankou by the late 19th century.

On March 10, 1862, the first liturgy was held in a specially arranged space in Dundin village, 53 km east of Beijing. In 1863, Russian press reported that Russian merchants trading in China, funded by baptized Chinese, planned to build an Orthodox church there. From 1864, the mission lost its diplomatic role, becoming solely religious and educational. In 1882, the first Chinese Orthodox priest, Mitrofan Ji, began conducting services in Chinese, a practice Catholics adopted only after the Second Vatican Council in 1964.

In 1895, Russia capitalized on China's defeat in the First Sino-Japanese War, seizing the Liaodong Peninsula, building Port Arthur, and declaring Manchuria a sphere of influence, constructing the Chinese Eastern Railway from Chita to Vladivostok and Port Arthur.

== Orthodox Mission in the 20th Century ==
The mission's relatively stable existence was disrupted in 1900 by the Boxer Rebellion, during which Christian churches were burned, and baptized Chinese were massacred (see Chinese Martyrs). Rebels besieged the diplomatic quarter. The mission's Northern Compound was looted and destroyed. Archimandrite Innokentiy (Figurovsky) and his group took refuge in the Russian diplomatic mission for two months. After the rebellion's suppression, Innokentiy found shelter in a corner of the Buddhist Yonghe Temple, establishing a temporary church and preventing its looting by the foreign troops.

In July 1901, after the mission's destruction, ober-procurator Konstantin Pobedonostsev proposed to close it, but it was rejected. Within a few years, the mission was restored with well-equipped mechanical workshops, a bakery, soap factory, foundry, boiler room, printing press, bookbindery, meteorological station, bathhouse, mill, dairy farm, orchards, and vegetable gardens. Its apiary produced up to 80 poods of honey annually. Near Mentoucunt, the mission purchased an abandoned temple and land, establishing the Exaltation of the Cross Skete. It also owned farms and stations around Beijing and neighboring provinces.

Russia's defeat in the Russo-Japanese War, fought on Chinese soil, the Xinhai Revolution of 1911, the fall of the Qing dynasty, and China's fragmentation did not halt the mission's work. By 1916, there were 5,587 Orthodox Chinese, with 583 baptized in 1915. According to a 1916 report, the mission managed two monasteries in Beijing, one skete near Beijing, five compounds in Russia, 19 churches, three chapels, five cemeteries, a seminary in Beijing, 18 male and three female schools, and an almshouse.

After the 1917 Russian Revolution, during the Russian Civil War and subsequent decades, the mission prioritized aiding Russian refugees. It provided temporary shelter and work, with some refugees becoming monks at the Dormition Monastery, while most used it as a stopover for emigration. In 1919, all Orthodox missionary stations in China were closed, shifting the mission's priorities. To support refugees, Archbishop Innokentiy lent them much of the mission's property.

In April 1920, the bodies of the Alapaevsk Martyrs were brought to Beijing, met with a cross procession, and placed in the Church of Seraphim of Sarov at the mission's cemetery. After a memorial service, eight coffins were placed in a crypt. A crypt under the church's ambo was later built with funds from ataman G. M. Semyonov to house them. In November 1920, the bodies of Elisabeth Feodorovna and her cellmate Varvara were moved to Jerusalem, while Prince Vladimir Paley's body was buried at the mission's cemetery at his family's request. During the interwar period, missionary work among native Chinese decreased. The mission's clergy and leadership, predominantly Russian, sometimes caused conflict among converted Chinese Orthodox.

== Mission's closure ==
After World War II, the Communist victory in China brought an anti-religious ideology. In 1946, the mission's head, Archbishop Viktor, was arrested for alleged collaboration with the Japanese and the Anti-Communist Committee of North China but was released after a week under Soviet pressure. After the People's Republic of China was established in 1949, most of Beijing's Russian community emigrated to the US, Australia, and Europe. In 1955, the mission closed due to lack of funds and parishioners. Archbishop Viktor returned to the Soviet Union. The Northern Compound and its properties were transferred to the Soviet state. Between 1956 and 1959, during the construction of a new Soviet embassy complex, most buildings, including churches, were demolished. In 1956, the bell tower was destroyed, and in 1957, the Church of All Holy Martyrs, housing the relics of Chinese martyrs and remains of the Alapaevsk imperial family members, was blown up. The Dormition Church became a garage, the sacristy a consular office, and the mission's extensive library was burned. The Southern Compound was transferred to the Chinese government, along with all Orthodox Church properties, following the dissolution of the Moscow Patriarchate's East Asian Exarchate in China. It is now a municipal park. During the Cultural Revolution, many centuries-old Orthodox cultural artifacts in China were destroyed. Late ordinations of Chinese bishops Vasily (Shuan) and Simeon (Du) by Patriarch Alexy I did not alter Chinese suspicion toward the Russian Church.

Preserved at the embassy are the bishop's quarters (a Chinese-style pavilion from Prince Lü's former estate, now called the Red Fanza), a residential building (also called the "fraternal" building, now a hotel), the sacristy and library building (now the consular department), and fragments of utility structures. In 2009, Dormition Church used as a garage in Soviet times, was restored and reconsecrated. A small square before the Red Fanza features the oldest Beiguan relic —a large iron tripod incense burner from the 17th century, made under Emperor Kangxi, possibly from the temple given to the Albazinians.

== Heads of the Mission ==
- 1715–1728 Hilarion (Lezhaysky), Archimandrite
- 1729–1735 Anthony (Platkovsky), Archimandrite
- 1736–1743 Hilarion (Trusov), Archimandrite
- 1744–1755 Gervasius (Lintsevsky), Archimandrite
- 1755–1771 Ambrose (Yumatov), Archimandrite
- 1771–1781 Nicholas (Tsvet), Archimandrite
- 1781–1794 Joachim (Shishkovsky), Archimandrite
- 1794–1807 Sophronius (Gribovsky), Archimandrite
- 1807–1821 Hyacinth (Bichurin), Archimandrite
- 1821–1830 Peter (Kamensky), Archimandrite
- 1830–1840 Benjamin (Morachevich), Archimandrite
- 1840–1849 Polykarp (Tugarinov), Archimandrite
- 1850–1858 Palladius (Kafarov), Archimandrite
- 1858–1864 Gurias (Karpov), Archimandrite
- 1865–1878 Palladius (Kafarov), Archimandrite
- 1879–1884 Flavian (Gorodetsky), Archimandrite
- 1884–1896 Amphilohius (Lutovinov), Archimandrite
- 1896–1931 Innocent (Figurovsky), Bishop
- 1931–1933 Simon (Vinogradov), Archbishop
- 1933–1954 Victor (Svyatin), Metropolitan

== Sources ==
- Краткая история Русской православной миссии в Китае : составленная по случаю исполнившегося в 1913 году двухсотлетнего юбилея ее существования [Short History of the Russian Orthodox Mission in China: Compiled on the Occasion of Its 200th Anniversary in 1913] (in Russian). Beijing: Типография Успенского Монастыря. 1916.
- Petrov, V. P. (1968). Российская Духовная миссия в Китае [Russian Spiritual Mission in China] (in Russian). Washington: Russian Book Business in the USA. p. 96.
- Kuznetsova T. V. (1997). Издательская деятельность Русской Духовной миссии (на примере изданий из фонда Дальневосточной государственной научной библиотеки) [Publishing Activities of the Russian Spiritual Mission (Based on Editions from the Far Eastern State Scientific Library)] (in Russian). Khabarovsk: ДВГУ. pp. 80–85.
- Tikhvinsky, S. L. (1997). История Российской духовной миссии в Китае [History of the Russian Spiritual Mission in China] (in Russian). Moscow: Svyato-Vladimir Brotherhood. p. 414. ISBN 5-900249-22-0.
- Alexandrov, B. G. (2006). Бэй-гуань: краткая история российской духовной миссии в Китае [Beiguan: A Short History of the Russian Spiritual Mission in China] (in Russian). Moscow; Saint Petersburg: Alliance-Archeo. p. 217. ISBN 5-98874-006-5.
- Datsyshen, V. G. (2010). Protopriest Dionisy Pozdnyaev (ed.). История Российской Духовной Миссии в Китае [History of the Russian Spiritual Mission in China] (in Russian). Hong Kong: Brotherhood of Saints Peter and Paul. p. 448. ISBN 978-9-88188-956-0.
- Golovin, S. A. (2013). Российская духовная миссия в Китае: исторический очерк [Russian Spiritual Mission in China: Historical Essay] (in Russian). Blagoveshchensk: BGPU Publishing. p. 284. ISBN 978-5-8331-0252-7.
- Golovin, S. A. (2013). Итоги начального этапа деятельности русской духовной миссии в Китае в ХVIII — начале XIX столетий (1715/16–1807) [Results of the Initial Stage of the Russian Spiritual Mission in China in the 18th–Early 19th Centuries (1715/16–1807)] (in Russian). Blagoveshchensk-Kheikhe-Harbin: Благовещенск-Хэйхэ-Харбин: Благовещенский государственный педагогический университет. pp. 24–33.
- Pozdnyaev D., Datsyshen V. G. "Пекинская духовная миссия" [Beijing Spiritual Mission]. Orthodox Encyclopedia (in Russian). Vol. 55. pp. 203–216.
- Li Jingcheng (2017). "Из истории Русской Духовной Миссии в Пекине с 1715 по 1860 годы (по китайским материалам)" [From the History of the Russian Spiritual Mission in Beijing from 1715 to 1860 (Based on Chinese Materials)]. International Relations and Dialogue of Cultures (in Russian) (5): 7–33.
- Pogodin S. N., Li Jingcheng (2018). "К истории российско-китайских торгово-экономических отношений (на примере Русской духовной миссии в Пекине)" [On the History of Russian-Chinese Trade and Economic Relations (Using the Example of the Russian Spiritual Mission in Beijing)]. Eurasian Legal Journal (in Russian). 3 (118): 441–445.
- Li Jingcheng (2020). "Из истории Русской Духовной миссии в Пекине с 1860 по 1917 гг" [From the History of the Russian Spiritual Mission in Beijing from 1860 to 1917]. International Relations and Dialogue of Cultures (in Russian) (8): 145–160.
- Feklova, T. Yu. (2020). "Под сенью Церкви: научная деятельность Русской духовной миссии в Китае в XIX в." [Under the Church's Wing: Scholarly Activities of the Russian Spiritual Mission in China in the 19th Century] (PDF). Journal of the Historical Society of Saint Petersburg Theological Academy (in Russian). 2 (5): 139–150.
