= Andrei Smirnov =

Andrei Smirnov may refer to:

- Andrey Smirnov (general) (1895–1941), Soviet general
- Andrey Smirnov (diplomat) (1905–1982), Soviet ambassador to Austria, Iran, Turkey and West Germany
- Andrei Smirnov (actor) (born 1941), Soviet Russian actor and filmmaker
- Andrey Smirnov (swimmer) (born 1957), Soviet Olympic swimmer
- Andrei Smirnov (footballer, born 1962), Russian football midfielder
- Andrey Smirnov (curler) (born 1973), Russian wheelchair curler
- Andrei Smirnov (footballer, born 1980), Russian football defender
- Andrei Smirnov (ice hockey) (born 1990), professional ice hockey player
- Andrei Smirnov (Gundam 00), anime character from the Gundam series

== See also ==
- Smirnov (surname)
- Smirnoff (surname)
