= Aleksandr Smirnov =

Aleksandr or Alexander Smirnov may refer to:

== Footballers ==
- Aleksandr Smirnov (footballer, born 1968), Russian football player and coach
- Aleksandr Smirnov (footballer, born 1982), Russian football player
- Aleksandr Smirnov (footballer, born 1996), Russian football player

== Politicians ==
- Aleksandr Aleksandrovich Smirnov (1958–2021), Russian politician
- Aleksandr Vasilyevich Smirnov (born 1958), Russian politician
- Aleksandr Petrovich Smirnov (1877–1938), USSR politician
- Aleksandr Smirnov (1907–1997), USSR politician, member of Central Committee elected by the 24th Congress of the Communist Party of the Soviet Union
- Alexander Smirnov (1909–1972), USSR politician, member of Central Committee elected by the 24th Congress of the Communist Party of the Soviet Union
- Aleksandr Smirnov (1912–1997), USSR politician, member of Central Committee elected by the 25th Congress of the Communist Party of the Soviet Union

== Others ==
- Alexander Smirnov (figure skater) (born 1984), Russian pair skater with Yuko Kavaguti
- Alexander Smirnov (ice hockey) (born 1964), Russian ice-hockey player
- Aleksandr Smirnov (sprinter) (born 1974), Russian athlete; competed for Russia at the 2000 Summer Olympics
- Alexander Smirnov (bridge) (b. 1983), German bridge player
- Alexander Smirnov (FBI informant), indicted informant in the Biden–Ukraine conspiracy theory

== See also ==
- Smirnov (surname)
- Smirnoff (surname)
