= Anton Smirnov =

Anton Smirnov may refer to:

- Anton Smirnov (footballer) (born 1983), Russian footballer
- Anton Smirnov (chess player) (born 2001), Australian chess player
- Anton Smirnov (figure skater) (born 1982), Russian figure skater

== See also ==
- Smirnov (surname)
- Smirnoff (surname)
