= Vasily Smirnov =

Vasily Smirnov may refer to:

- Vasily Smirnov (writer) (1905–1979), Soviet writer
- Vasily Dmitriyevich Smirnov (1846–1922), Russian orientalist
- Vasily Smirnov (metallurgist) (1915–1973), Soviet metallurgist
- Vasily Sergeyevich Smirnov (painter) (1858–1890), Russian painter
- Vasily Smirnov (footballer) (1908–1987), Russian footballer
- Vasily Smirnov (serial killer) (1947–1980), Soviet serial killer, rapist, cannibal, brigand, robber and arsonist

== See also ==
- Smirnov
- Smirnoff (surname)
