= Anatoly Smirnov =

Anatoly Smirnov is the name of:

- Anatoly Smirnov (diplomat), Russian diplomat and ambassador; see List of diplomatic missions of Russia
- Anatoly Smirnov (swimmer) (born 1958), Soviet Olympic swimmer
- Anatoly Filippovich Smirnov (1909–1986), Soviet scientist
- Anatoly Mikhailovich Smirnov (born 1935), Russian scientist

== See also ==
- Smirnov (surname)
- Smirnoff (surname)
