= Oleg Smirnov =

Oleg Smirnov may refer to:

- Oleg Aleksandrovich Smirnov (b. 1964), Soviet and Russian footballer with FC Spartak Moscow, FC Rotor Volgograd and FC Shinnik Yaroslavl
- Oleg Igorevich Smirnov (b. 1967), Transnistrian politician
- Oleg Smirnov (ice hockey) (b. 1980), Russian ice hockey player drafted by Edmonton Oilers in 1998
- Oleg Smirnov (Paralympic footballer), Russian footballer who competed in the 2004 and 2008 Paralympics, see Football 7-a-side at the 2008 Summer Paralympics
- Oleg Valeryevich Smirnov (b. 1990), Russian footballer, goalkeeper

== See also ==
- Smirnov (surname)
- Smirnoff (surname)
