= Nikolai Smirnov =

Nikolai Smirnov may refer to:

- Nikolay Smirnov (admiral) (1917–1992), Soviet Navy Admiral, Hero of the Soviet Union
- Nikolai Mikhailovich Smirnov, Governor of the Saint Petersburg Governorate, 1855–1861
- Nikolai Smirnov (cinematographer), Soviet film cinematographer that shot Aerograd
- Nikolai Smirnov (water polo) (born 1961), Soviet water polo player who participated in the 1988 Olympics
- Nikolai Smirnov (mathematician) (1900–1966), Soviet mathematician

== See also ==
- Smirnov
- Smirnoff (surname)
