= Vladimir Smirnov =

Vladimir Smirnov may refer to:

- Vladimir Smirnov (politician) (1887–1937), Russian Bolshevik and Soviet politician
- Vladimir Smirnov (mathematician) (1887–1974), Soviet mathematician
- Vladimir Smirnov (fencer) (1954–1982), Soviet fencer killed at the 1982 World Championships
- Vladimir Smirnov (businessman) (born 1957), Russian businessman
- Vladimir Smirnov (skier) (born 1964), Soviet/Kazakhstani cross-country skier
- Vladimir Smirnov (ski jumper) (born 1947), Soviet Olympic ski jumper
- Vladimir A. Smirnoff (1917–2000), Soviet-born Canadian entomologist
- Vladimir Nikolaevich Smirnov (1947–2014), Soviet footballer
- Vladimir Smirnov (footballer) (born 1977), Russian footballer
- Vladimir Smirnov (cyclist) (born 1978), former Lithuanian cyclist
- Vladimir Vasilyevich Smirnov (1849–1918), Imperial Russian Army general
- Vladimir Smirnov (philosopher) (1932–1996), Russian philosopher
- Vladimir Smirnov (consul) (1876–1952), Russian Bolshevik and Soviet consul to Stockholm
- Vladimir Smirnov (speedway rider), Soviet Union speedway rider

== See also ==
- Smirnov (surname)
- Smirnoff (surname)
