= Roman Smirnov =

Roman Smirnov may refer to:

- Roman Smirnov (sprinter) (born 1984), Russian sprinter runner
- Roman Smirnov (speed skater) (born 1986), Belarusian speed skater

== See also ==
- Smirnov (surname)
- Smirnoff (surname)
