= Dmitry Smirnov =

Dmitry Smirnov may refer to:

- Dmitry Matveyevich Smirnov (1919–2005), mathematician
- Dmitri Smirnov (tenor) (1882–1944), Russian tenor
- Dmitri Smirnov (composer) (Dmitri Nikolaevich Smirnov, 1948–2020), Russian-British composer
- Dmitry Smirnov (entrepreneur) (born 1958), Russian politician, executive, and entrepreneur
- Dmitri Smirnov (footballer, born 1969), Russian football defender/midfielder
- Dmitry Smirnov (weightlifter) (born 1973), Russian Olympic weightlifter
- Dmitry A. Smirnov (born 1980), Russian football midfielder
- Dmitri N. Smirnov (footballer) (born 1980), Russian football centre-back

== See also ==
- Smirnov (surname)
- Smirnoff (surname)
