= Smirnov =

- Pronunciation: English: /ˈsmɜːrnɒf/; Russian: [smʲɪrˈnof]
- Language: Russian

Smirnov (masculine, Russian: Смирно́в) or Smirnova (feminine, Russian: Смирно́ва) is one of the two most common surnames in Russia. Smirnov (Russian: Смирнов) is derived from an adjectival nickname smirnyj (смирный; in archaic form smirnoy, смирной), meaning 'quiet, still, peaceful, gentle'.

== Smirnov ==
- Aleksandr Smirnov (disambiguation), multiple people
- Aleksandr Petrovich Smirnov (1877–1938), Russian old Bolshevik revolutionary and Soviet statesman
- Alexei Smirnov (physicist) (born 1951), Russian particle physicist
- Alexey Smirnov (disambiguation), multiple people
- Anatoly Smirnov (disambiguation), multiple people
- Andrei Smirnov (disambiguation), multiple people
- Anton Smirnov (disambiguation), multiple people
- Artem Smirnov (tennis) (born 1988), Ukrainian tennis player
- Artyom Aleksandrovich Smirnov (born 1989), Russian footballer
- Boris Smirnov (disambiguation), multiple people
- Danila Smirnov (born 2001), Russian football player
- Daniil Smirnov, Russian Paralympic swimmer
- Denys Smirnov (born 1975), Ukrainian footballer
- Dmitry Smirnov (disambiguation), multiple people
- Eulogius (Smirnov) (1937–2020), Russian Orthodox prelate
- Evgeny Smirnov (born 1987), Ukrainian DJ and producer known by his stage name Omnia
- Gennady Mikhailovich Smirnov (1955–2000), Soviet footballer
- Grigory Sergeyevich Smirnov (born 1997), Russian competitive ice dancer
- Igor Smirnov (disambiguation), multiple people
- Ilya Smirnov (1887–1964), Soviet army general
- Ivan Smirnov (disambiguation), multiple people
- Karin Smirnov (1880–1973), Finnish Swedish author and daughter of August Strindberg
- Konstantin Smirnov (1854–1930), general of the Imperial Russian Army
- Konstantin Smirnov (military Orientalist) (1877–1938), military Orientalist of the Imperial Russian Army
- Leonid Smirnov (footballer) (1889–1980), Russian football player
- Leonid Smirnov (politician) (1916–2001), Soviet politician and engineer
- Lev Smirnov (1911–1986), Soviet statesman and jurist
- Maksim Smirnov (born 1979), Estonian football midfielder
- Mikhail Smirnov (disambiguation), multiple people
- Nikolai Smirnov (disambiguation), multiple people
- Oleg Smirnov (disambiguation), multiple people
- Pavel Smirnov (1882–1947), Russian chess player
- Pyotr Arsenievich Smirnov (1831–1898), Russian businessman, founder of the Smirnoff vodka brand
- Pyotr Smirnov (1897–1939), Soviet Commissar, Deputy Minister of Defense and Commander of the Soviet Navy
- Roman Smirnov (disambiguation), multiple people
- Sergey Smirnov (disambiguation), multiple people
- Stanislav Smirnov (born 1970), mathematician
- Valentin Smirnov (athlete) (born 1986), Russian middle distance runner
- Valentin Panteleimonovich Smirnov (born 1937), Russian nuclear fusion physicist
- Vasily Smirnov (disambiguation), multiple people
- Vitali Smirnov (born 1935), Russian member of the International Olympic Committee
- Vladimir Smirnov (disambiguation), multiple people
- Yanaki Smirnov (born 1992), Bulgarian footballer
- Yevhen Smirnov (born 1993), Ukrainian football midfielder
- Yuriy Smirnov (disambiguation), also Yuri Smirnov; multiple people

== Smirnova ==
- Alexandra Smirnova (1809–1882) Russian lady-in-waiting
- Galina Konstantinovna Smirnova (1910–1980), Russian composer
- Lyudmila Smirnova (born 1949), Russian figure skater
- Mariya Smirnova (1920–2002), Russian military pilot
- Sophia Smirnova (1852–1921), Russian writer
- Svetlana Smirnova (handballer) (born 1977), Russian handballer
- Svetlana Smirnova (sport shooter) (born 1962), Russian sport shooter
- Svetlana Smirnova (actor) (born 1956), Russian actor
- Tamara Mikhaylovna Smirnova (1935–2001), Soviet/Russian astronomer
- Yekaterina Smirnova (born 1956), Soviet heptathlete

== Other variations ==
- Smirnoff (surname), variant of transliteration
- Smirnovs, Latvian form
- Smirnovas, Lithuanian form
- Smirnow, variant of transliteration
- Ukrainian forms: the Russian surname Смирнов may be rendered either as Смирнов (Smyrnov) or Смірнов (Smirnov).
