= Vladimir Mikhaylovich Smirnov =

Vladimir Mikhaylovich Smirnov may refer to:

- Vladimir Smirnov (politician) (1887–1937), Russian Communist and Bolshevik
- Vladimir Smirnov (skier) (born 1964), Soviet/Kazachstani cross-country skier, multiple Winter Olympics medalist

== See also ==
- Vladimir Smirnov (disambiguation)
