= Aleksandr Vladimirovich Smirnov =

Aleksandr Vladimirovich Smirnov may refer to:

- Aleksandr Smirnov (footballer, born 1968), Russian football player and coach
- Aleksandr Smirnov (footballer, born 1980), Russian football player

== See also ==
- Aleksandr Smirnov (disambiguation)
