= Alexey Smirnov =

Alexey Smirnov (Russian: Алексей Смирнов; alternatively spelled: Aleksey, Aleksei, or Alexei; Smirnov or Smirnoff) may refer to:

- Aleksei Smirnov (actor) (1920–1979), Russian actor
- Aleksei Smirnov (footballer) (born 1994), Russian football goalkeeper
- Alexei Smirnov (ice hockey) (born 1982), Russian ice hockey player
- Aleksey Smirnov (pilot) (1917–1987), flying ace and twice Hero of the Soviet Union
- Alexey Smirnov (table tennis) (born 1977), Russian table tennis player
- Alexei Smirnov (physicist) (born 1951), Russian physicist
- Alexei Smirnov (politician) (born 1973), Russian politician
- Alexi Smirnoff (1947-2019, as Michel Lamarche), Canadian pro-wrestler
- Aleksey Smirnov (1921–unknown), USSR politician, member of Central Committee elected by the 26th Congress of the Communist Party of the Soviet Union

== See also ==
- Smirnov (surname)
- Smirnoff (surname)
