= Yuriy Smirnov =

Yuri (Yuriy, Yurii) Smirnov may refer to:

- Yuri Andreyevich Smirnov (1923–1984), Russian linguist
- Yuri Mikhailovich Smirnov (1921–2007), Soviet and Russian mathematician
- Yuriy Smirnov (minister) (born 1948), Ukrainian Minister of Internal Affairs in 2001–2003
- Yuri Smirnov (physicist) (1937-2011), Russian physicist
- Yuriy Smyrnov (born 1939), Ukrainian politician

== See also ==
- Smirnov (surname)
- Smirnoff (surname)
