= Mikhail Smirnov =

Mikhail Smirnov may refer to:

- Mikhail Ivanovich Smirnov (1880-1940), Russian naval officer, first and only Minister of the Navy of the White Movement.
- Mikhail Smirnov (footballer, born 1881) (1881-1957), Russian football striker
- Mikhail Nikolayevich Smirnov (general) (1900–1967), Soviet military commander
- Mikhail Alexandrovich Smirnov (astronomer) (1954–2006), Russian astronomer
- Mikhail Smirnov (footballer, born 1967), Belarusian footballer who played for FC Dnepr Mogilev, Lokomotiv Minsk and lower-level German teams, among others
- Mikhail Smirnov (footballer, born 1990), Russian football centre-back
- Mikhail Smirnov (singer) (born 2003), Russian singer, record producer and stage actor, participant of Junior Eurovision Song Contest 2015

== See also ==
- Smirnov (surname)
- Smirnoff (surname)
- Asteroid 109573 Mishasmirnov, named after the astronomer
