= Ivan Smirnov =

Ivan Smirnov may refer to:

- Ivan Smirnov (politician) (1881–1936), Russian revolutionary
- Ivan Fyodorovich Smirnov (1885–1919), Russian revolutionary, Bolshevik
- Ivan Smirnov (aviator) (1895–1956), Russian pilot
- Ivan Smirnov (guitar player) (1955–2018), Russian guitarist
- Ivan Smirnov (cyclist) (born 1999), Russian cyclist

== See also ==
- Smirnov (surname)
- Smirnoff (surname)
