= Smirnov (disambiguation) =

Smirnov is a Russian surname.

Smirnov or Smirnova may also refer to:

- Smirnov (volcano) at Kunashir Island, Kuril Islands, Russia
- Smirnov Peak, Queen Maud Land, Antarctica
- Dorsa Smirnov, wrinkle ridge system on the Moon
- 5540 Smirnova, minor planet

== See also ==
- 74P/Smirnova–Chernykh, periodic comet in Solar System
- Smirnoff (disambiguation)
