= Nicolai A. Vasiliev =

Russian mathematician (1880–1940)

Nicolai Alexandrovich Vasiliev (Russian: Николай Александрович Васильев), also Vasil'ev, Vassilieff, Wassilieff (11 July [O.S. 29 June] 1880 – December 31, 1940), was a Russian logician, philosopher, psychologist, poet. He was a forerunner of paraconsistent and multi-valued logics.

== Early years ==
Vasiliev was born on June 29 O.S., 1880 in Kazan, Russia. His father, Professor Alexander V. Vasiliev, was a fairly well known mathematician, his grandfather was the outstanding sinologist Professor Vassily P. Vasiliev, and his great grandfather was the prominent astronomer Ivan M. Simonov, who was a close colleague of Nikolai Lobachevsky.

Wanting to be a psychologist, Vasiliev studied at the medical faculty and the historico-philological faculty of Kazan University (1906), where he was offered the position of privat-dozent in 1910.

As a university student, Vasiliev was enthusiastic about symbolist style poetry and published some books of verses of his own (for example,"The longing for eternity") and translations of the poetry of Emile Verhaeren and Algernon Charles Swinburne.

== Work in logic ==
Although Vasiliev outlined an abstract to the article on the "logic of relatives" by Charles Sanders Peirce as early as in 1897, it was only in 1908 that he entirely devoted himself to logic.

On May 18, 1910 Vasiliev presented a lecture (published in October that same year) "On Partial Judgements, on the Triangle of Opposites, on the Law of Excluded Third" in which he put forward for the first time ever the idea of (non-Aristotelian) logic, free of the laws of excluded middle and contradiction. Reasoning by analogy with the "imaginary" geometry of Lobachevsky, Vasiliev called his novel logic "imaginary", for he assumed it was valid for the worlds where the above-mentioned laws did not hold, worlds with beings having other types of sensations. He distinguished levels of logical reasoning, and introduced the notion of metalogic.

Vasiliev spent 1912-13 in Western Europe (mostly Germany) and published his salient works "Logic and Metalogic" and "Imaginary (non-Aristotelian) logic". Vasiliev constructed non-Aristotelian logic using the concepts, and even the manner of reasoning, common to Aristotelian logic. He was aware of the achievement in mathematical logic (and even carefully studied Ernst Schröder's works) but did not make an attempt to formalise "imaginary" logic.

His only work in a foreign language (English) - a concise abstract of his "imaginary logic" - was published in Naples in 1924.

== Late years ==
In 1914, when World War I broke out, Vasiliev was drafted into the army, where he became seriously mentally ill. Nevertheless, he returned to teaching at Kazan University, but in 1922 was forcibly retired by the new Bolshevik administration. This act aggravated his ailment: Vasiliev spent most of the following 20 years in a mental hospital, thus rescued from the Stalin regime. He died on December 31, 1940. The place where he was buried is unknown.

The pioneer ideas of Vasiliev were rediscovered in the early 1960s by Vladimir Smirnov, and formed a basis mainly for paraconsistent logic. Some well-known scholars in the 1960s considered his work to be the precursor of multi-valued logic. The informal style and conceptual riches of Vasiliev's works make them especially valuable. In 2012 an international conference on Vasiliev's work was held in Moscow where a number of important modern paraconsistent logicians contributed.

== Bibliography ==
Works

- Vasiliev, N.A., Imaginary Logic. Moscow, Nauka, 1989 (in Russian). ISBN 5-02-007946-4.
- Vasiliev, N.A., Logic and Metalogic translated by V.L. Vasyukov, in Axiomathes, IV (1993). n. 3, pp. 329–351.
- Vasiliev, N.A., Imaginary (non-Aristotelian) Logic, translated by R. Vergauwen and E. A. Zaytsev, in Logique et Analyse, 46 (2003), n. 182, pp. 127–163.
- Vasiliev, N.A., Logica Immaginaria. Roma: Carocci, 2012 (Italian translation by Venanzio Raspa of all the logical writings) ISBN 978-88-430-6666-7.

Studies

- Arruda, A.I. The Survey of Paraconsistent Logic. In: Mathematical logic in Latin America/ Eds. Arruda A.I., Chuaqui R., Da Costa N.C.A., Amsterdam: New York: Oxford. North-Holland, 1980, pp. 1–41.
- Bazhanov, V.A. N.A. Vasiliev (1880 – 1940). Moscow, Nauka, 1988 (in Russian). ISBN 5-02-005953-6
- Bazhanov, V.A. The Fate of One Forgotten Idea: N.A.Vasiliev and His Imaginary Logic. In: Studies in Soviet Thought, 1990, vol.39, N3-4, pp. 333–334
- Bazhanov, V.A. Charles Peirce’s Influence on Logical Ideas of N.A. Vasiliev. In: Modern Logic, 1992, vol. 3. N 1, pp. 48–56
- Bazhanov, V.A. The Origins and Emergence of Non-Classical Logic in Russia (Nineteenth Century until the Turn of the Twentieth Century). In: Zwischen traditioneller und moderner Logik. Nichtklassiche Ansatze. Mentis-Verlag, Paderborn, 2001, S.205 – 217.ISBN 3-89785-203-9
- Bazhanov, V.A. History of Logic in Russia and the USSR. Moscow, Kanon+, 2007 (in Russian). ISBN 5-88373-032-9
- Bazhanov, V.A. N.A. Vasiliev and His Imaginary Logic. Restoration of One Forgotten Idea. Moscow, Kanon+, 2009 (in Russian). ISBN 978-5-88373-196-8
- Raspa, V. Thinking About Contradictions: The Imaginary Logic of Nikolai Aleksandrovich Vasil’ev, Chams, Springer, 2017.

== See also ==
Triangle of opposition

== External references ==
Philosophy Documentation Center website Non-Classical Stems from Classical: N. A. Vasiliev’s Approach to Logic and his Reassessment of the Square of Opposition, book review by Valentin A. Bazhanov (2008
