= Smirnow =

Smirnow is a transliteration variant of the Russian-language surname Smirnov. Notable people with the surname include:

- Andrzej Smirnow, Polish politician
- Zoya Smirnow (1897/98 – after 1916), Russian woman who fought during World War I disguised as a man
