= Igor Smirnov (chess player) =

Ukrainian chess grandmaster (born 1987)

Personal information
- Native name: Ігор Смирнов
- Born: October 28, 1987 (age 38) Sevastopol, Ukrainian SSR, Soviet Union
- Website: chess-teacher.com

Chess career
- Country: Ukraine
- Title: Grandmaster (2008)
- FIDE rating: 2496 (August 2026)
- Peak rating: 2505 (January 2009)

Ihor Valentynovych Smirnov (Ukrainian: Ігор Валентинович Смирнов; born 28 October 1987) is a Ukrainian chess player and Grandmaster (2008). He is also a certified chess coach and the founder of the Remote Chess Academy, an online platform offering courses and educational materials for chess players worldwide.

== Chess career ==
Smirnov was born in Sevastopol and began playing chess at the age of eight. In 2001, at just fourteen years old, he earned the title of International Master. He won the Ukrainian Junior Chess Championship in 2002, and in 2004 he received his chess trainer's certificate, becoming an official coach the following year.

He achieved the Grandmaster title in 2008 at the age of 21 after completing the necessary rating and norm requirements. Smirnov won or shared first place in several tournaments, including the Czech Junior Open, and achieved a peak Elo rating of 2505 in January 2009.

Earlier in his career, Smirnov represented Ukraine in multiple international youth competitions. He won several medals at the European Team Junior Championships — team silver in 2002 and individual silver in 2003 — and was also part of the Ukrainian team that earned silver at the 2003 World Under-16 Olympiad.

He had notable performances in various open tournaments across Ukraine, including first place (shared) in Alushta (2002, with Olga Aleksandrova), a second-place finish in another Alushta event behind Denis Yevseyev, victory in Sevastopol (2004, with Roman Kalenik), and top results in Illichivsk (2007) and Odessa (2008, sharing first with Yuriy Drozdovskyy, Yaroslav Zherebukh, and Eduard Andreev).

== Teaching and Remote Chess Academy ==
After 2009, Smirnov shifted his focus from professional play to teaching. He founded the Remote Chess Academy (RCA), where he provides online lessons, video courses, and training materials aimed at improving players’ strategic understanding and psychological approach to chess.

As of late August 2026, the Remote Chess Academy YouTube channel surpassed 970,000 subscribers.
