= Smirnoff (disambiguation) =

Smirnoff is a brand of vodka.

Smirnoff may also refer to:

- Smirnoff (surname)
- Novell "Smirnoff", codename of Personal NetWare 1.0

== See also ==
- Smirnov (disambiguation)
