= Igor Smirnov =

Igor Smirnov may refer to:

- Igor Smirnov (politician) (born 1941), president of the unrecognized Transdniestrian Moldovan Republic
- Igor Smirnov (scientist) (1951–2004), controversial Russian mind control researcher
- Igor Smirnov (chess player) (born 1987), Ukrainian chess grandmaster

== See also ==
- Igor Mirnov
