= Smirnovs =

Family name

Smirnovs is the Latvian-language form of the Russian surname Smirnov. Notable people with the surname include:

- Andris Smirnovs (born 1990), Latvian professional cyclist
- Deniss Smirnovs (born 1999), Latvian professional ice hockey player
- Georgijs Smirnovs (born 1936), Latvian footballer and football manager
- Māris Smirnovs (born 1976), Latvian footballer
- Vitālijs Smirnovs (born 1986), Latvian footballer
