= Eduard Andreev =

Ukrainian chess grandmaster (born 1980)

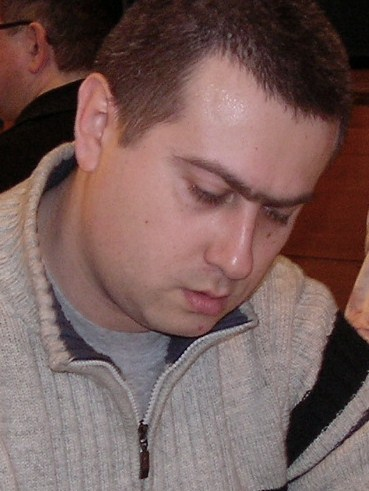
- Eduard Andreev in 2012

Personal information
- Born: March 12, 1980 (age 46)

Chess career
- Country: Ukraine
- Title: Grandmaster (2005)
- Peak rating: 2514 (November 2012)

Eduard Andreev (born March 12, 1980) is a Ukrainian chess grandmaster. He achieved his GM title at FIDE by 2005. He is a keen Scotch game player, having only lost 3 out of the 20 professional games with it as white.
