= Andrei Smirnov (ice hockey) =

Russian ice hockey player

- Born: April 24, 1990 (age 34); Cherepovets, Russian SFSR, Soviet Union
- Height: 6 ft 0 in (183 cm)
- Weight: 187 lb (85 kg; 13 st 5 lb)
- Position: Centre
- Shot: Left
- Played for: HC Lipetsk; Wenatchee Wild; Severstal Cherepovets; Almaz Cherepovets; Metallurg Novokuznetsk; Yermak Angarsk; Kuznetskie Medvedi; Titan Klin; Kristall Saratov; Izhstal Izhevsk; Buran Voronezh
- NHL draft: Undrafted
- Playing career: 2009–2018

Andrei Smirnov (born April 24, 1990) is a Russian professional ice hockey player who has played in the Kontinental Hockey League for Severstal Cherepovets and Metallurg Novokuznetsk.

== Career statistics ==
			Regular season					Playoffs
Season	Team	League	GP	G	A	Pts	PIM	GP	G	A	Pts	PIM
2005–06	Severstal Cherepovets-2	Russia3	12	1	0	1	2	—	—	—	—	—
2006–07	Severstal Cherepovets-2	Russia3	56	14	12	26	28	—	—	—	—	—
2007–08	Severstal Cherepovets-2	Russia3	29	15	13	28	4	—	—	—	—	—
2008–09	HC Lipetsk	Russia2	53	15	17	32	42	4	2	0	2	0
2008–09	Severstal Cherepovets-2	Russia3	—	—	—	—	—	9	2	4	6	2
2008–09	Wenatchee Wild	NAHL	3	0	0	0	0	—	—	—	—	—
2009–10	Severstal Cherepovets	KHL	1	0	0	0	0	—	—	—	—	—
2009–10	HC Lipetsk	Russia2	54	11	21	32	14	—	—	—	—	—
2009–10	Almaz Cherepovets	MHL	2	0	1	1	2	3	2	0	2	0
2010–11	Metallurg Novokuznetsk	KHL	33	1	2	3	14	—	—	—	—	—
2010–11	Yermak Angarsk	VHL	7	0	0	0	2	6	0	0	0	2
2010–11	Kuznetskie Medvedi	MHL	4	0	2	2	2	—	—	—	—	—
2011–12	Severstal Cherepovets	KHL	6	0	0	0	0	—	—	—	—	—
2011–12	Almaz Cherepovets	MHL	23	7	6	13	2	—	—	—	—	—
2012–13	Titan Klin	VHL	6	1	0	1	2	—	—	—	—	—
2012–13	Kristall Saratov	VHL	31	9	12	21	6	—	—	—	—	—
2013–14	Kristall Saratov	VHL	42	8	3	11	4	—	—	—	—	—
2014–15	Izhstal Izhevsk	VHL	25	5	3	8	8	2	0	0	0	0
2015–16	Izhstal Izhevsk	VHL	34	1	6	7	18	1	0	0	0	0
2016–17	Buran Voronezh	VHL	11	0	3	3	4	—	—	—	—	—
2017–18	Buran Voronezh	VHL	3	0	0	0	2	—	—	—	—	—
2017–18	Izhstal Izhevsk	VHL	7	1	0	1	0	—	—	—	—	—
KHL totals			40	1	2	3	14	—	—	—	—	—
VHL totals			166	25	27	52	46	9	0	0	0	2
