= Anton Smirnov (footballer) =

Russian footballer

Personal information
- Full name: Anton Yuryevich Smirnov
- Date of birth: 7 August 1983 (age 43)
- Place of birth: Kyubyshev, Russian SFSR
- Height: 1.91 m (6 ft 3 in)
- Position: Defender

Senior career*
Years	Team	Apps	(Gls)
2002–2003	Krasnodar-2000	4	(0)
2003	Uralan Plus Moscow	2	(0)
2003–2004	Reutov	16	(0)
2005	Nara-Desna Naro-Fominsk	18	(0)
2006	Mashuk-KMV Pyatigorsk	27	(0)
2007	Spartak-MZhK Ryazan	8	(0)
2007	Zvezda Irkutsk	2	(0)
2008	Lokomotiv Minsk	11	(0)
2010	FC Olimp Fryazino (D4)		
2011	Sheksna Cherepovets	11	(0)
2011	Podolye	5	(0)
2012	Slavia Mozyr	7	(0)
2013	FC Dimitrov		
- * Club domestic league appearances and goals

Anton Yuryevich Smirnov (Russian: Антон Юрьевич Смирнов; born 7 August 1983) is a former Russian professional football player.

== Club career ==
He played two seasons in the Russian Football National League for FC Mashuk-KMV Pyatigorsk, FC Spartak-MZhK Ryazan and FC Zvezda Irkutsk.
