= Sergey Smirnov (artist) =

Russian painter

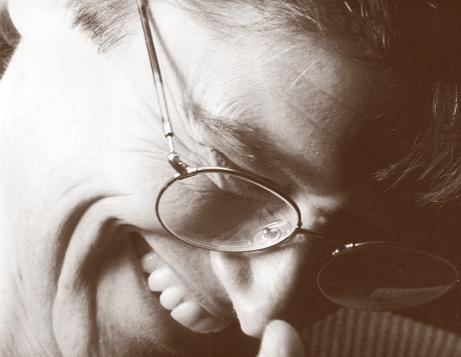
- Born: Sergey Ivanovich Smirnov; April 12, 1953; Petropavlovsk-Kamchatsky, Russia
- Died: November 8, 2006 (aged 53); Sausalito, California
- Known for: Painting; drawing

Sergey Ivanovich Smirnov (Russian: Серге́й Ива́нович Смирно́в; 12 April 1953 – 8 November 2006) was a Russian artist.

Smirnov ranks Gustav Klimt, the Austrian cornerstone of the art nouveau movement painter, as an important influence. He also cites Andrei Rublev, Feofan Grek, Modigliani, and Rembrandt as major influences, as well as those who were celebrated masters of Slavic icon painting. Smirnov's style has traces of his favorite period of Russian art, known as “parsuna”, which bridged the worlds of religious and personal portraiture, as Russian painters began adopting the portrait painting styles of Western European salons. “Parsuna”, which is derived from the Latin persona, means 'mask' and the hybrid imagery; was first used in the 17th century, re-mains in play to this day in the art of Sergey Smirnov.

== Biography ==
Sergey Smirnov was born in 1953, in an area of Russia bordering the Pacific Ocean known as the Kamchatka Peninsula. His father was an army officer. In his late teen years, Smirnov and his family settled in Moscow.

In 1979, Smirnov began to take classes at the Moscow City Art College. He graduated from the art college in 1984 as class valedictorian, with a master's degree in art. His skill in church and cathedral renovation led to his position as a restorer of aging and antique church icons and frescoes.

In 1988, Smirnov became a member of the International Federation of Artists and National Artists’ Union of Russia. Starting in 1991, Smirnov served as chief editor for the Advertising and Image Creation Corporation of the Russian government's International Trade Corporation. Smirnov designed and developed logos and graphics for a wide variety of Russian corporations, winning countless national and international awards for his work. Though in 1994 this spirit moved him to devote himself entirely to painting. He became the regular participant of international solo and group exhibitions.

In 1996, Smirnov exhibited at the Orlean House in London. In 1997, Smirnov was honored as only the third living artist to have a personal exhibit in the Kremlin’s Manezh, which ranks as one of the most prestigious art galleries in the world. Smirnov has been avidly collected throughout the world, and his art is included in several noteworthy Russian collections, including those of former Russian president Boris Yeltsin, former prime minister Viktor Chernomyrdin, former minister of defense Evgeny Shaposhnikov and many others.

In July 2001, he signed a contract with Fingerhut Group Publishers, California. From 2001 to 2006, Smirnov's paintings were exhibited in the Fingerhut Galleries in California. Fingerhut Group releases graphic limited editions.

Sergey Smirnov died suddenly of a heart attack on November 8, 2006, in Sausalito while coming to his solo exhibition in La Jolla.

== Gallery ==
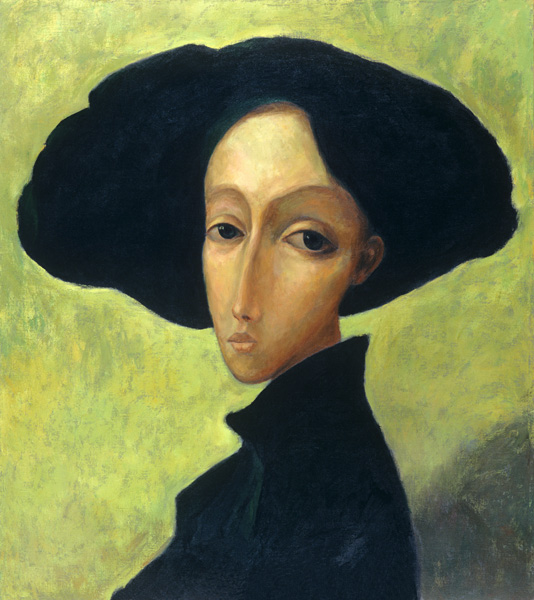
Face, 1996

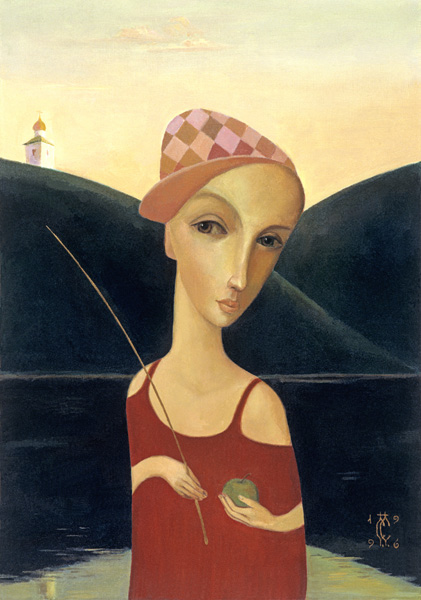
Little Fisherman, 1996

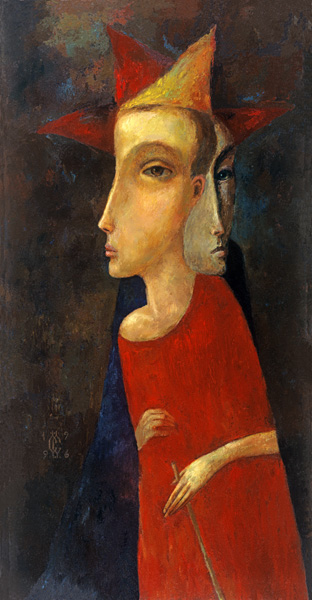
Pilgrims, 1996

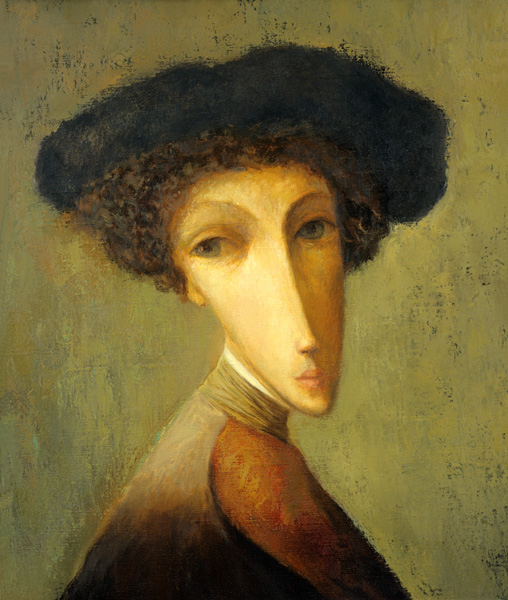
Ambassado, 2001

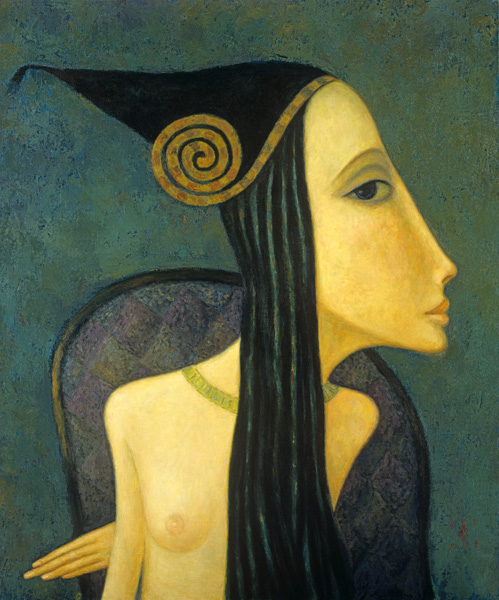
Babylon Games, 2002

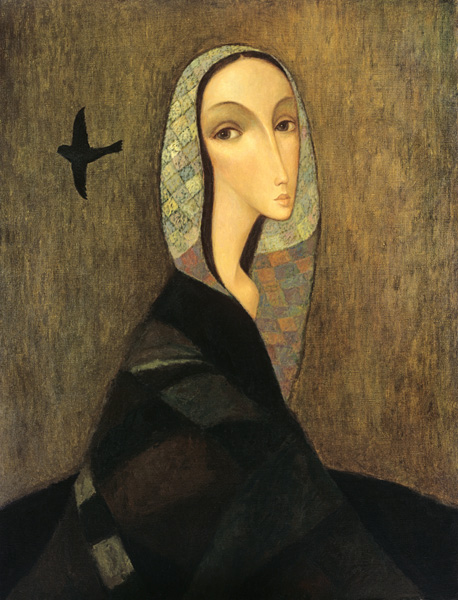
Lark, 2002

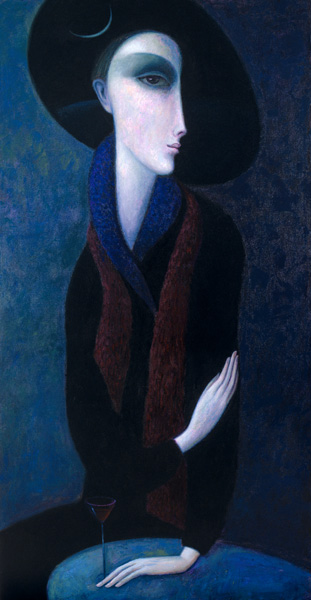
Night Visitor, 2005

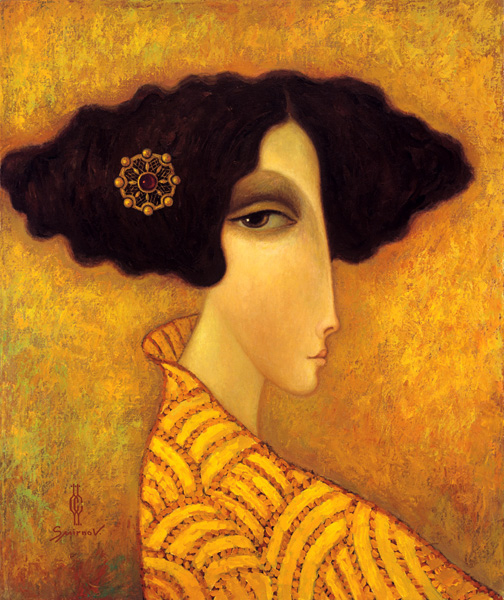
Amethyst, 2005

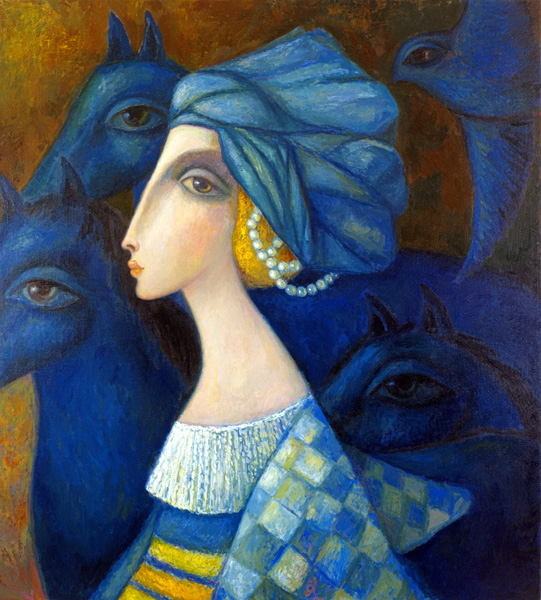
Procession, 2006

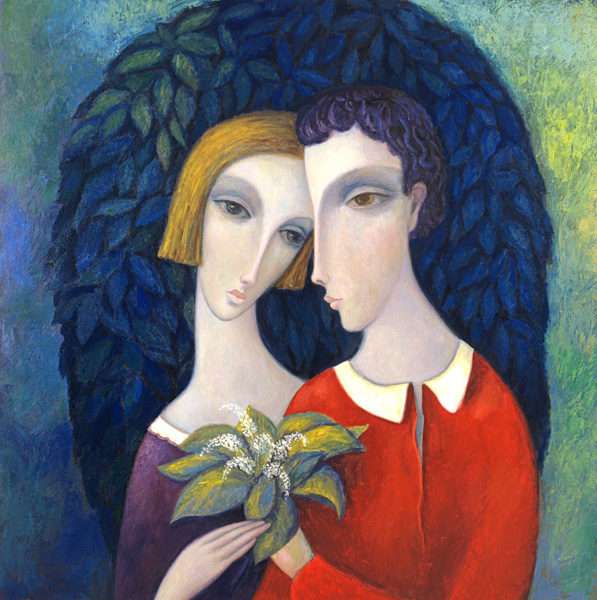
Homage to Chagall, 2006
