= Simon (Vinogradov) =

Russian archbishop in China (1876–1933)

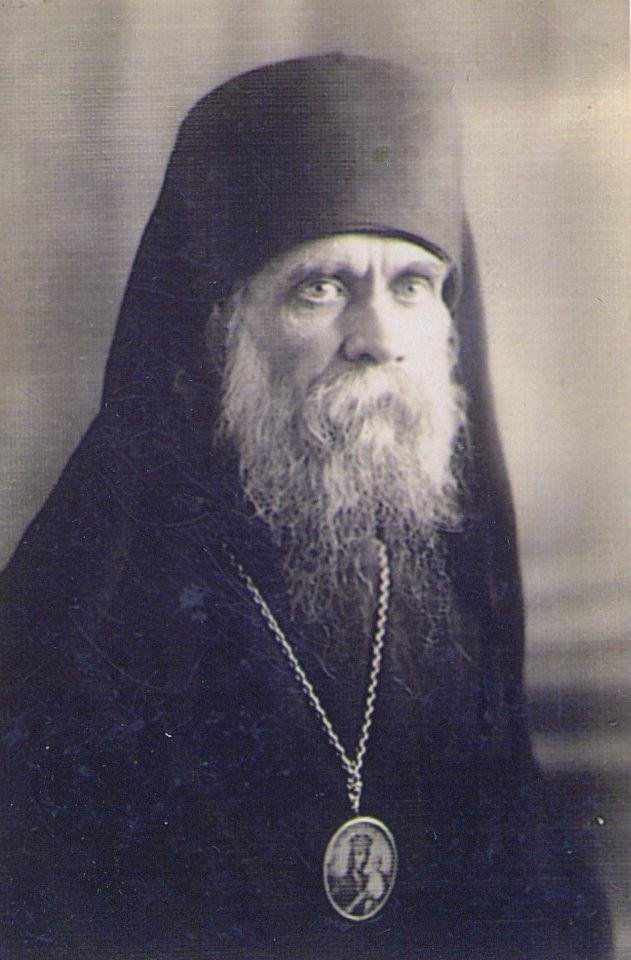

Archbishop Simon (Russian: Архиепископ Симон; secular name Sergei Andreyevich Vinogradov, Russian: Сергей Андреевич Виноградов; 1876 - February 24, 1933) was a clergyman of the Russian Orthodox Church and a hierarch of the Russian Orthodox Church Outside of Russia. He served as the head of the Russian Ecclesiastical Mission from 1928 to 1933.

== Early life ==
He studied at theological seminary in Vladimir and later joined the Kazan Theological Academy where he met Anthony (Khrapovitsky), who was the rector of the seminary and the future Metropolitan of ROCOR. While at the academy he was tonsured a monk, took the name Simon, became a hierodeacon, and later a hieromonk. After having graduated with a degree in theology in 1902 he was assigned to the Russian Ecclesiastical Mission in China. He was elevated to archimandrite in 1907.

== Episcopacy ==
In the summer of 1922 Simon was ordained by Russian Orthodox Church Outside of Russia (ROCOR) as the bishop of Shanghai, vicar to the Diocese of Beijing, and held this title until 1932. In 1931 when the previous head of the Russian Ecclesiastical Mission and Metropolitan Innocent (Figurovsky) of Beijing died, the ROCOR synod made Simon his successor and an archbishop. Simon died in 1933 of pneumonia and was buried in the crypt of the Church of All Holy Martyrs in Beijing. Simon was in communication with ROCOR during his episcopacy, rather than the Moscow Patriarchate.

== Literature ==
- Епископ Симон // Православная Русь. — 1958. — №. 3. — С. 5-6.
- Кострюков, Андрей (2022). "В тени святого Иоанна (Максимовича)... Жизнь и служение архиепископа Шанхайского Симона (Виноградова)" (PDF). Труды Перервинской православной духовной семинарии (in Russian) (24). Moscow: 59–69.
