= Boris Smirnov (ethnologist) =

Russian ethnologist (1924–1979)

- Born: 1924; Moscow, USSR
- Died: 1979 (aged 54–55); Zubova Polyana, USSR
- Citizenship: USSR
- Education: Moscow Timiryazev Agricultural Academy
- Known for: Ethnology works, Kelginino Gravefield excavation
- Father: Yevgeny Smirnov
- Awards: Medal "For Battle Merit"
- Scientific career
- Fields: Fennic Ethnology, Ancient History of Eastern Europe
- Website: zubova-poliana.narod.ru

Boris Smirnov (1924 – 1979) was a Russian ethnologist and historian, excavator of Kelginino Gravefield in Eastern Mokshaland. He collected a great bulk of field material on ancient Moksha history, including folklore, toponymy, and historical and archeological data connected to Moxel culture, traditions and medieval trade routes.

== Ethnological findings ==
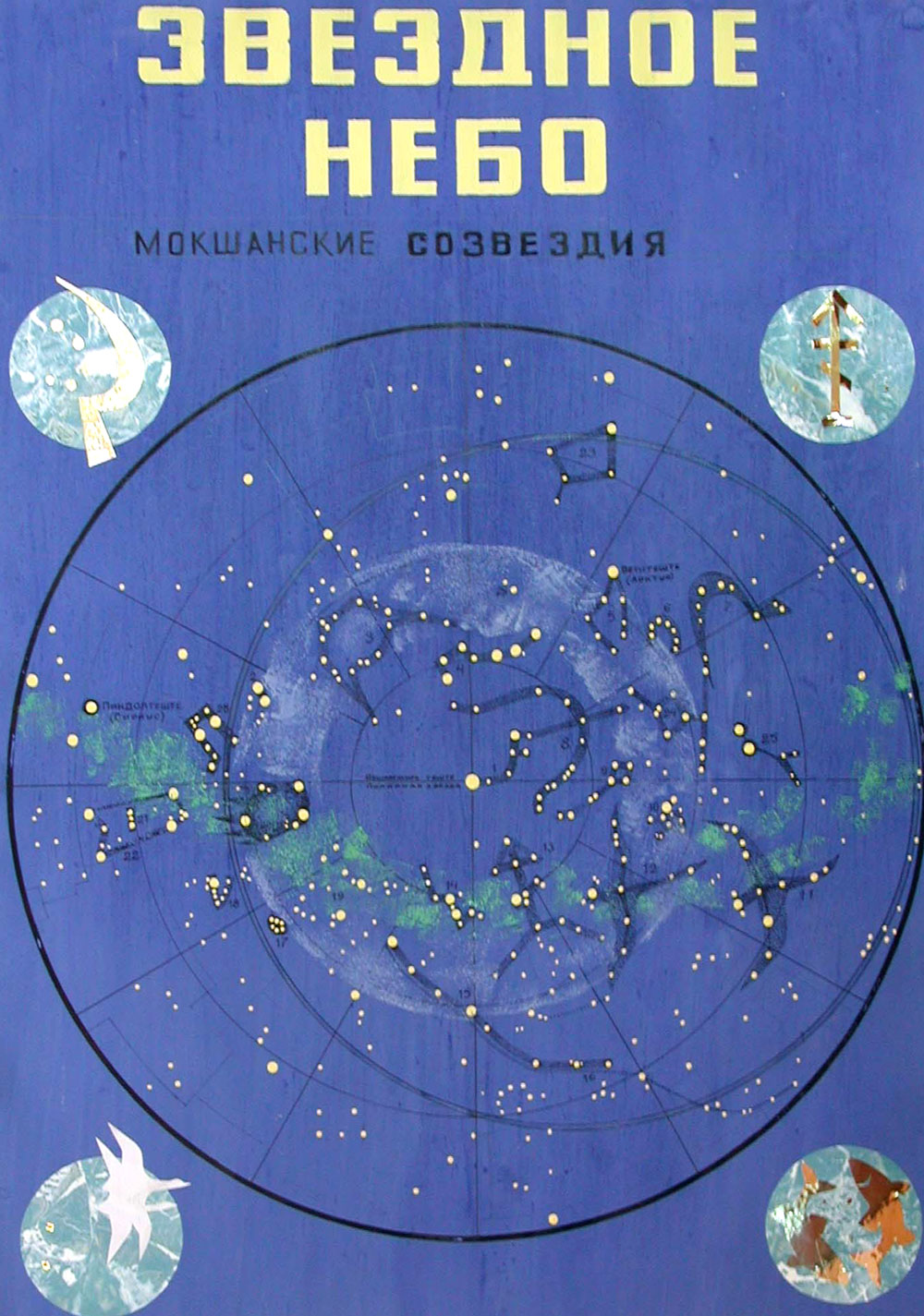
Old Moksha star map used by travellers and navigators in Middle Ages

Boris Smirnov found that there is a medieval star chart used in Mokshaland by travellers, wanderers, herders and navigators on the Volga trade route. He had been collecting epic tales and legends and then checking the places they narrated about. He had been accumulating information on feasts and everyday life, agriculture and honey hunting. He recorded law and traditional punishment details, old crafts peculiarities and old children's games rules. The rest of his time he spent in the city library reading all the scientific journals they received. He led correspondence with scholars who sometimes kept answering him, sometimes were reluctant to keep the discussion going in spite of the fact he sometimes proposed plausible solutions. The neighbours knew that he might be found three places: the post office, where he received tons of books, the library or the forest if he had a short handle spade with him. He used to wear cheap suits and a cap in summer and fufaika wool jackets, and a soldier's fur hat in winter time. He roamed about Big Moksha Forest and often ran across Dubravlag border lines. Since it was a special territory and trespassing was forbidden he from time to time was detained and questioned, but always released after phone calls and enquiries were sent to Zubova Polyana. Besides ethnology and archeological artefacts he was a botanist and collected a full herbarium of Zubovo-Polyansky Aimak. He had a small garden and grew Manchurian walnut (Juglans mandshurica) in it, and always had lots of perfect vegetables and various flowers. "He had been treated with compassion by his friends Valerian Ryabov, Adolf Prokhorov and some others" writes Sergey Olenin. He didn't bother them much but always gave a short report on his recent work. Boris Smirnov's health condition had been deteriorated in 1966. He was not able to finish his Book 4 and it seems that he didn't start the Book 5 he mentioned in his works. In 1979 he died. Adolf Prokhorov delivered his diaries and drafts to the Mordvoia Republic Government Institute For Humanities. Most of his field work had remained unpublished in the Institute For Humanities archives for years. His first two books were published posthumously in 2012.

=== Ethnographic material ===
Ethnographic material includes old Moksha rites, traditions, bygone tales, pagan beliefs, mythology, legends and folklore material reflecting life and customs. Major part consists of tales and legends regarding toponymy history: founding of villages, names of rivers, lakes and gorges.

=== Letters to Kremlin regarding Mordovia renaming ===
Since Boris Smirnov had learnt Moksha language and discovered many facts of the ancient Mokshaland history that been never taught in schools he was convinced that the term Mordovia was historically incorrect and moreover derogatory or to be precise was an ethnic slur for Mokshas and Erzyas. He applied for the republic renaming to the government with all the evidence he had proving that the term Mordovia does not comply with the contemporary situation and republic must be renamed to Erzya-Moksha. He received an answer that he might be under some misapprehension. He went to Moscow hoping that a personal appointment would solve the misunderstanding. He wrote again and made appointments again. Olenin suggests this was in vain, writing: "He was lucky not to be arrested for his views opposing the Communist Party line, may be because he was treated as not entirely healthy person."

== Kelginino Gravefield ==
The most striking findings were the Carolingian sword and Vladimir the Great's and his son Novgorodian prince Vysheslav's symbols of power. They date back to 1010. The latter became the proof for declaring the historical unity of Russian and Mordva peoples that can be traced back 1000 years. Later the government stopped supporting the archeological studies.

== Critics ==
Due to a deep internal culture and intuition he was able to see the importance and give the right value to separate folk tradition facts. Lack of his knowledge in the field of ethnology, ethnography and folklore had been compensated by diligence, painstaking and consistent work on collecting field materials.

Boris Kevbrin, Vladimir Rogachev, and Dmitry Shulyaev (Books 1, 2, and 4 introduction)

== Works ==
- Book 1. Middle Partsa and Chiush [rivers]. 1963
- Book 2. Middle Vad and Lundan [rivers]. 1964
- Book 3. Low Vad [river]. 1965
- Book 4.

== See also ==
- Gardariki
