= Church of All Holy Martyrs (Beijing) =

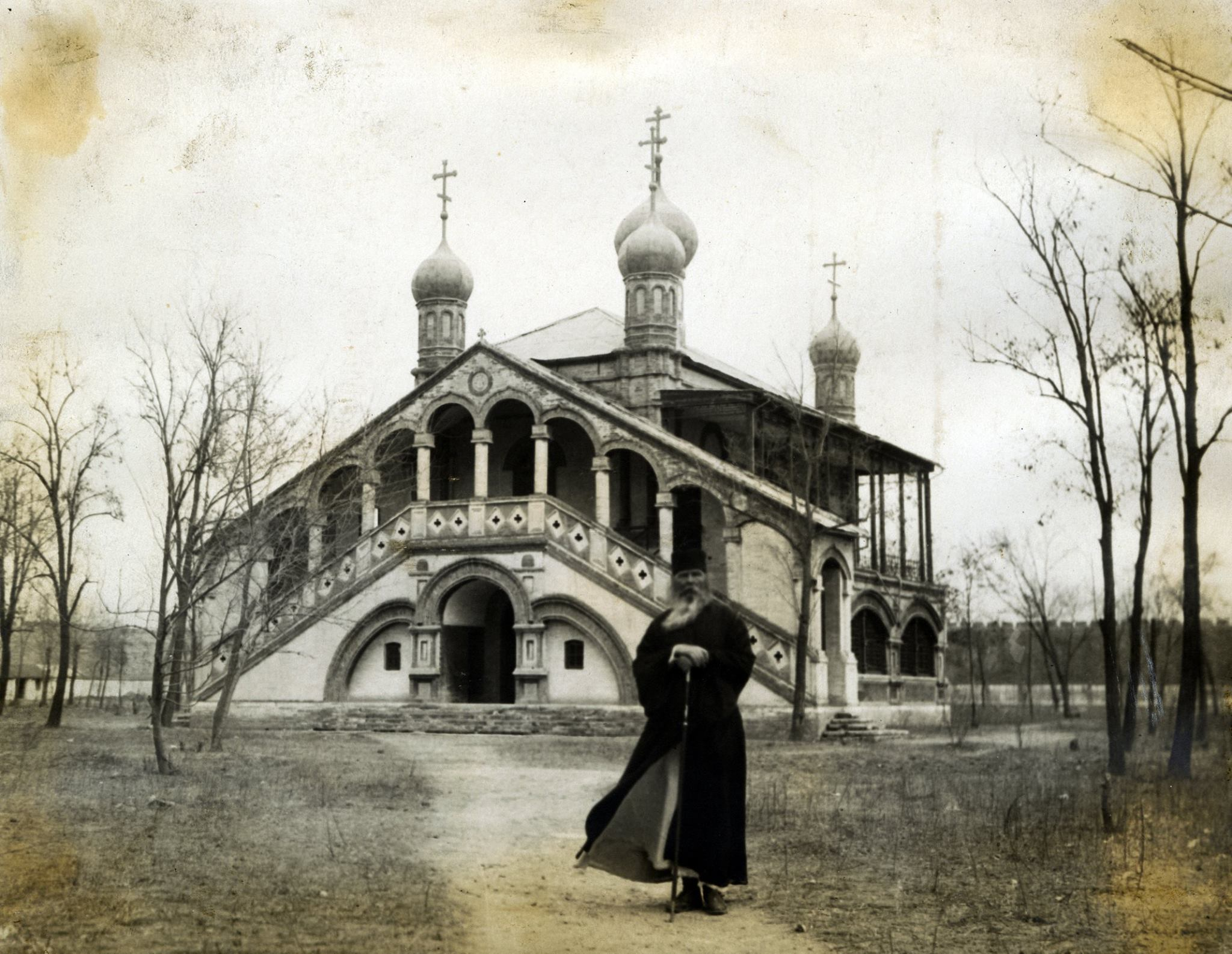
The Church of All Holy Martyrs in Beijing and Metropolitan Innocent (Figurovsky), who had initiated its construction

The Church of All Martyrs in Beijing was a church of the Russian Orthodox Church and Russian Orthodox Church Outside of Russia, located on the territory of the Russian Ecclesiastical Mission in Beijing. It was built in 1903 and destroyed in 1957.

== History ==
On October 11, 1901, the 18th head of the Russian Ecclesiastical Mission to Beijing, Archimandrite Innocent (Figurovsky), presented a list of 222 Chinese Orthodox Christians who had been killed in the Boxer Rebellion to the Holy Synod of the Moscow Patriarchate and petitioned for permission to build a church in their memory. It would be dedicated to All Holy Martyrs of the Orthodox Church and built on the site of the former mission church which had been destroyed in the rebellion. A Decree of Emperor Nicholas II from the Holy Synod No. 2874 dated April 22, 1902 allowed the construction of the church with a crypt to hold the remains of the Chinese martyrs who were Orthodox Christians. The decree also established an annual celebration for the Orthodox Christian community in China on the 10th and 11th of June O.S. (23 - 24 June N.S.) through a procession to the places in Beijing where Orthodox Christians had been killed. The construction of the church was finished and its altar was consecrated in 1904. In 1906, a second floor was built over the one-story crypt building, in which the church in the name of St. Nicholas was consecrated. The church was almost always closed and daily services were conducted in the Church of the Assumption, also located in Beijing, though services were celebrated multiple times a year in the Church of All Martyrs.

People buried in the church include Archbishop Simon (Vinogradov) of Shanghai and Beijing (1876–1933), and Dmitry Horvat (1859–1937).

The church was destroyed in 1957.

On April 3, 2007, Holy Saturday, a memorial cross and plaque were erected on the former site of the church.
