= Vasily Vasilyev =

Russian sinologist

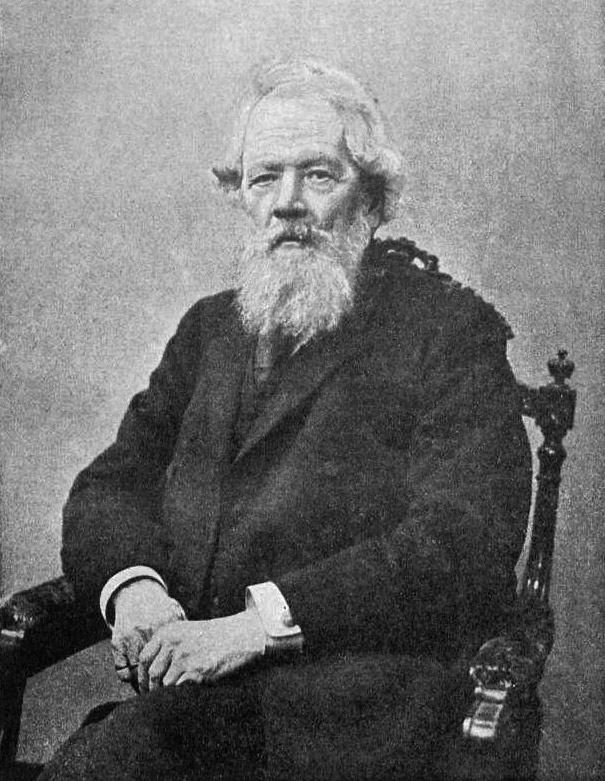
Vasily Pavlovich Vasilyev

Vasily Pavlovich Vasilyev or Wassiljew (Russian: Васи́лий Па́влович Васи́льев; 1818-1900) was the preeminent Russian Sinologist of the 19th Century.

Vasiliev was born in Nizhny Novgorod and entered the Oriental department of the Kazan University in 1834. It was the first school of Oriental studies in Russia. During a ten years' residence at the Peking Orthodox Mission (1840-50) Vasiliev was able to study a number of obscure Buddhist manuscripts. Back in Russia in 1850, he was offered the chair in Chinese philology at the university of Kazan. He was elected into the Petersburg Academy of Sciences in 1886 and was in charge of the Department of Oriental Studies at the University of St. Petersburg between 1878 and 1893.

Vasiliev's magnum opus is a three-volume history of Buddhism (1857, 1860, 1865). The first volume was quickly translated into German and French. Another important work, Islam in China, did not appear in English until 1958. Some of Vasiliev's most ambitious works remained unpublished and were destroyed through the negligence of his domestics. His grandson Nicolai A. Vasiliev (1880-1940) was a noted logician.
