= Aleksandr Vasilyevich Smirnov =

Soviet0Russian politician (born 1958)

Aleksandr Smirnov
- Александр Смирнов
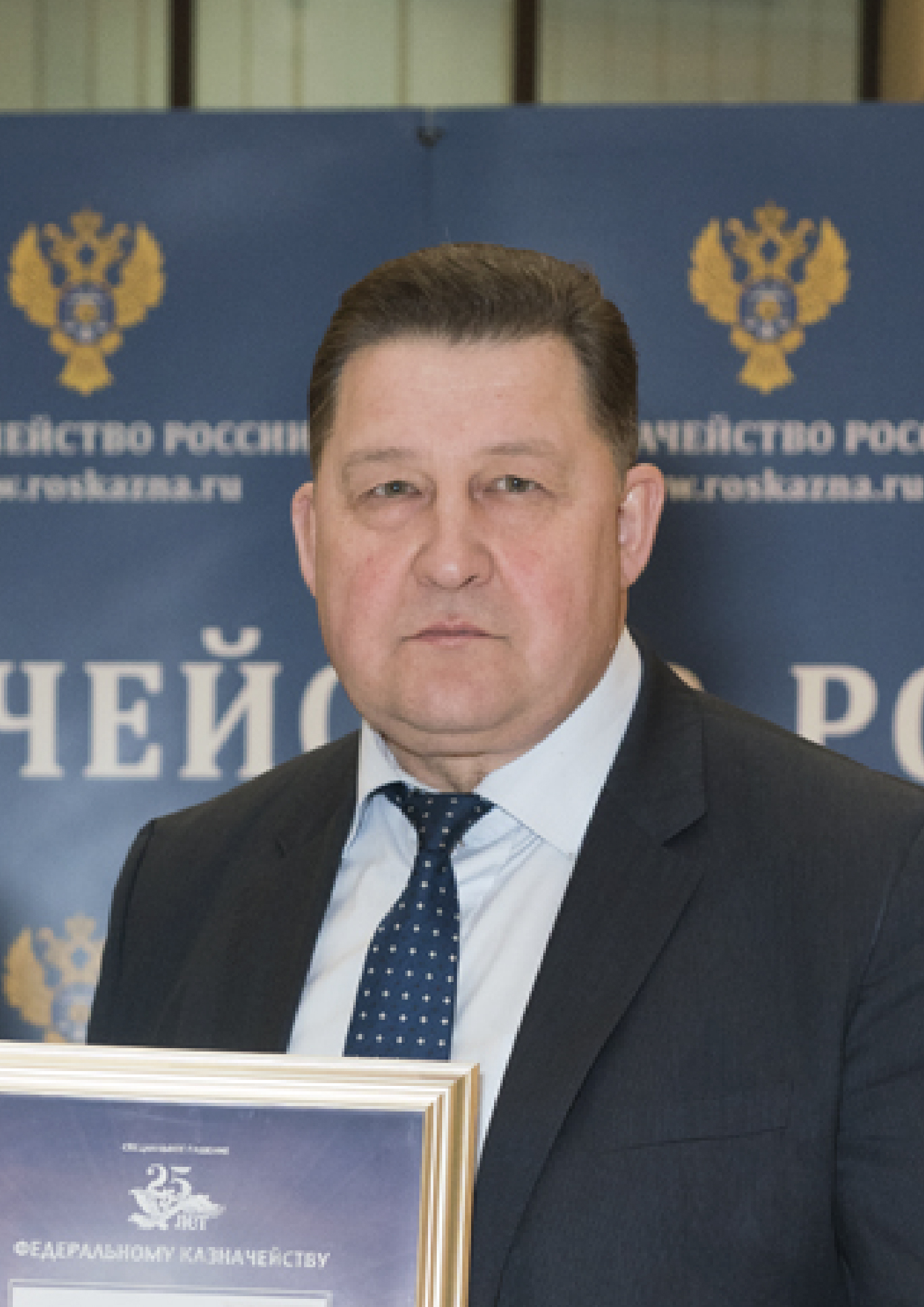
- Smirnov in 2018

Russian Federation Senator from the Republic of Mordovia
- In office 13 April 2005 – 22 April 2013
- Preceded by: Nikolai Bychkov
- Succeeded by: Nikolai Petrushkin

Personal details
- Born: 19 October 1958 (age 67) Moscow, Soviet Union
- Education: Moscow Finance Institute; Russian MFA Diplomatic Academy
- Occupation: Economist, politician

Aleksandr Vasilyevich Smirnov (Russian: Александр Васильевич Смирнов; born 19 October 1958) is a Soviet and Russian statesman and politician, economist, first head of the Treasury of Russia (1992-1998), First Deputy Minister of the Russian Federation for Taxes and Duties (1998-2005), member of the Federation Council, the upper house of the Federal Assembly from the Republic of Mordovia, a representative from the executive body of the Republic of Mordovia (2005-2013), head of the Federal Service for Financial and Budgetary Supervision (2013-2016), advisor to the head of the Federal Service for Labor and Employment.

== Biography ==
Born into a family of financiers. His father was Vasily Ivanovich Smirnov (1927-2015) worked in the Ministry of Finance of the Soviet Union, in July 1964 he was transferred to the Gokhran system. In 1967 he was appointed director of the Diamond Fund exhibition, which he headed for more than 10 years. His mother, Lidiya Semyonovna Smirnova, born in 1930, after graduating with honors from the Kazan Financial and Economic Institute, she was assigned to the USSR Ministry of Finance, where she worked from 1952 to 1985.

In 1981, he began his career as an economist at the USSR Ministry of Finance. He worked as a senior economist, leading economist, deputy head of department, head of department, deputy head of the Main Budget Directorate — head of department, deputy head of the Budget Directorate — head of department of the USSR Ministry of Finance

In 1987, he was appointed deputy head of the department for financing the metallurgical industry of the Department for financing heavy industry of the Soviet Ministry of Finance. In 1988, he headed the subdepartment of the department for financing the fuel and energy complex and metallurgy of the Soviet Ministry of Finance. From 1990 to 1991, he worked as the head of the department for economics and finance of the production sector of the Soviet Ministry of Finance. In 1991, he was appointed deputy head of the Main Budget Directorate. From 1991 to 1993, he held the position of head of the Budget Execution Department of the Russian Ministry of Finance. From 1993 to 1997 he served as Head of the Main Directorate of the Federal Treasury of the Ministry of Finance of Russia and Deputy Minister of Finance, member of the board of the Ministry of Finance. In 1998, he was appointed to the post of Deputy Minister of Finance of the Russian Federation. In the same year, Alexander Smirnov was appointed First Deputy Head of the State Tax Service of Russia, which was transformed into the Ministry of Taxes and Duties of Russia on December 25, 1998.

From 1998 to 2005 he served as First Deputy Minister of the Russian Federation for Taxes and Duties. From 2005 to 2013 he served as a member of the Federation Council of the Federal Assembly from the Republic of Mordovia as a representative of the executive body of that region. He worked in the Committee on Budget and Financial Market as Deputy Chairman of the Committee. From January 2013 to February 2016 he served as Head of the Federal Service for Financial and Budgetary Supervision.
