= Boris Smirnov-Rusetsky =

Russian painter (1905–1993)

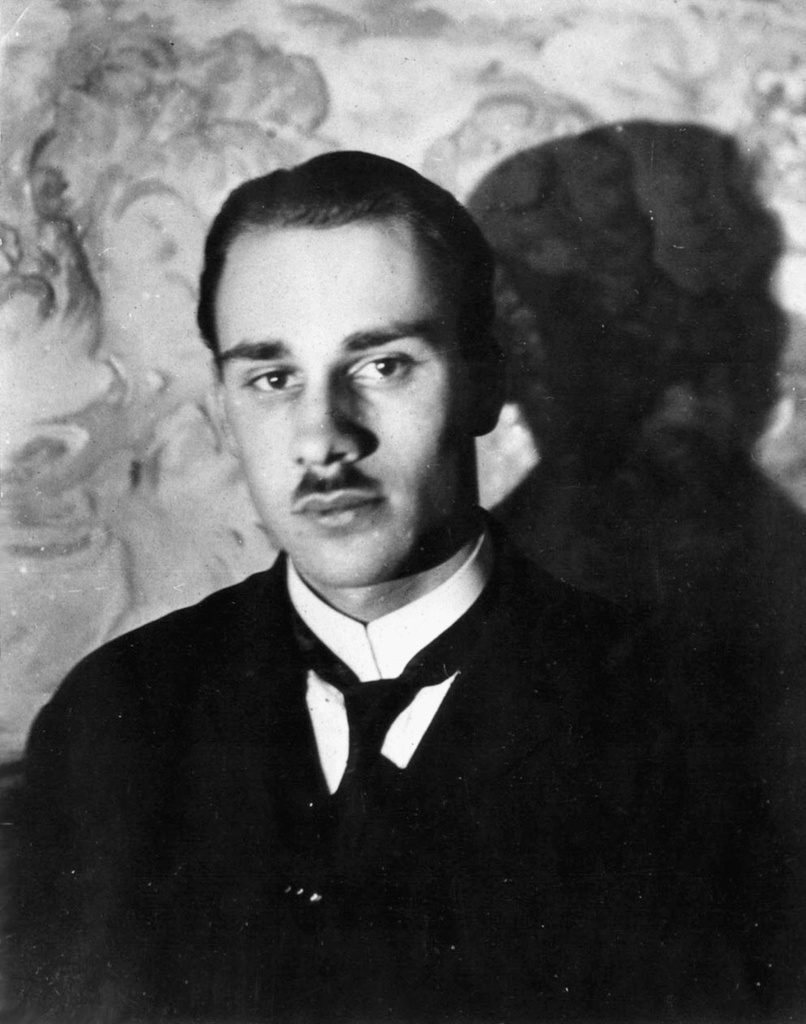
- Born: Boris Smirnov-Rusetsky; 21 January 1905
- Died: 7 August 1993 (aged 88)

Boris Smirnov-Rusetsky (21 January 1905 – 7 August 1993; Russian: Борис Алексеевич Смирнов-Русецкий) was a Soviet painter, member of Amaravella group. (In Sanskrit language Amaravella means immortality sprouts).

He was influenced by ideas of Russian cosmism and eastern mysticism.

== Biography timeline ==
- 1905 - Born on 21 January in St.Petersburg
- 1917 - Moved to Moscow with family
- 1922 - Joined the Moscow Engineering Financial University
- 1923 - The first exhibition in Moscow
- 1941-1955 - Imprisoned in Saratov and then in Rybinsk, Akmolinsk and Makinsk
- 1956 - Rehabilitated after 20th Congress of the CPSU. Returns to Moscow
- 1967 - Personal exhibition in Moscow
- 1969 - Second personal exhibition in Moscow
- 1979-1993 - Exhibitions in Moscow, Kiev, Pskov, Mongolia, Finland, Berlin and other places
- 1993 - Smirnov-Rusetsky died on 7 August in St.Petersburg
