= Sergei Smirnov (footballer) =

Russian footballer

Personal information
- Full name: Sergei Sergeyevich Smirnov
- Date of birth: 17 December 1981 (age 44)
- Height: 1.79 m (5 ft 10 1/2 in)
- Position: Midfielder

Senior career*
| Years | Team | Apps | (Gls) |
| 1999 | Zarya Leninsk-Kuznetsky | 20 | (0) |
| 2000 | Kuzbass Kemerovo | 11 | (0) |
| 2001 | Spartak-Orekhovo Orekhovo-Zuyevo | 36 | (1) |
| 2002 | Mostransgaz Gazoprovod | 33 | (4) |
| 2003 | Dynamo Izhevsk | 11 | (3) |
| 2003 | Dinamo Minsk | 1 | (0) |
| 2004 | Izhevsk | 11 | (0) |
| 2004 | Zhenis Astana | 1 | (0) |
| 2005–2008 | Alnas Almetyevsk | 104 | (2) |

International career
| 2002–2003 | Russia U21 | 6 | (0) |
- * Club domestic league appearances and goals

Sergei Sergeyevich Smirnov (Russian: Серге́й Серге́евич Смирнов; born 17 December 1981) is a Russian former professional footballer.

== Honours ==
- Belarusian Premier League bronze: 2003
