= Vasily Smirnov (metallurgist) =

Soviet metallurgist (1915–1973)

- Born: Vasily Sergeyevich Smirnov; 2 January 1915; Petrograd, Russian Empire
- Died: 5 March 1973 (aged 58); Leningrad, RSFSR, Soviet Union
- Occupation: Metallurgist

Vasily Sergeyevich Smirnov (Russian: Васи́лий Серге́евич Смирно́в; 2 January [O.S. 20 December 1914] 1915, Petrograd – 5 March 1973, Leningrad) was a Soviet metallurgist and, from 1960, a corresponding member of the Academy of Sciences of the Soviet Union. For 17 years from 1956, he was the rector of the then Leningrad Polytechnic Institute. He made notable contributions to understanding the plastic deformation process.
