= Aleksandr Smirnov (footballer, born 1982) =

Russian footballer

Personal information
- Full name: Aleksandr Sergeyevich Smirnov
- Date of birth: 6 June 1982 (age 44)
- Height: 1.83 m (6 ft 0 in)
- Positions: Midfielder; defender

Youth career
- Yunika Tolyatti

Senior career*
Years	Team	Apps	(Gls)
2003	FC Metallurg Vyksa	6	(1)
2004	FC Titan Moscow	27	(1)
2005	FC Khimki	4	(0)
2006	FC Presnya Moscow	8	(1)
2006–2007	FC Spartak-MZhK Ryazan	33	(4)
2007–2009	FC Lada Togliatti	71	(0)
2010–2012	FC Sokol Saratov	46	(3)
2012–2015	FC Lada-Togliatti Togliatti	75	(6)
- * Club domestic league appearances and goals

Aleksandr Sergeyevich Smirnov (Russian: Александр Серге́евич Смирнов; born 6 June 1982) is a former Russian professional football player.

== Club career ==
He played 2 seasons in the Russian Football National League for FC Khimki and FC Spartak-MZhK Ryazan.
