= Konstantin Smirnov (military Orientalist) =

Konstantin Nikolaevich Smirnov (1877 – 1938) was a military Orientalist of the Imperial Russian Army, having the rank of staff captain.

He graduated from the Officers’ Courses of Oriental Languages, and served in the Caucasian Military District Staff. In 1907, he was appointed as personal tutor to Qajar prince Soltan Ahmad Mirza (later Ahmad Shah), succeeding Captain Kol’man to the post. After being issued a "fake" retirement, Smirnov arrived in the Iranian capital of Tehran on 1 July 1907, and would serve as tutor to Ahmad Shah Qajar until 1914. Smirnov took part in the Russian war efforts of World War I, and after the Russian Civil War joined the Bolshevik cause, working as an interpreter in the Red Army stationed in the Caucasus. In the 1920s and 1930s, he functioned as a research associate in the Academy of Sciences of the Georgian SSR of the Soviet Union. He was executed during Stalin's Great Purge.

Smirnov wrote numerous works on Iranian history, ethnography and economics. His memoirs about his experience in Iran, Zapiski vospitatelya persidskogo shaha, 1907-1914 gody ("Memoirs of the Tutor of the Persian Shah, Years 1907-1914") are considered to be rich in detail.

== Sources ==
- Andreeva, Elena (2009). "RUSSIA v. RUSSIANS AT THE COURT OF MOḤAMMAD-ʿALI SHAH". In Yarshater, Ehsan (ed.). Encyclopædia Iranica (Online ed.). Encyclopædia Iranica Foundation.
- Andreeva, Elena (2014). "RUSSIA i. Russo-Iranian Relations up to the Bolshevik Revolution". In Yarshater, Ehsan (ed.). Encyclopædia Iranica (Online ed.). Encyclopædia Iranica Foundation.
- Volkov, Denis V. (2018). Russia's Turn to Persia: Orientalism in Diplomacy and Intelligence. Cambridge University Press. ISBN 978-1108645270.
