= Vasily Smirnov (serial killer) =

Soviet serial killer, rapist and cannibal

- Born: Vasily Alexandrovich Smirnov; 30 November 1947; Sopka, Tver Oblast, RSFSR
- Died: c. 1980 (aged 32–33); Kresty Prison, Leningrad, RSFSR
- Cause of death: Execution by shooting
- Other names: The Gatchina Psychopath; The Necromancer; Vasya-Kotik
- Status: Executed
- Conviction: Murder with aggravating circumstances
- Penalty: Death

Details
- Victims: 5
- Span of crimes: 3 September – 12 December 1979
- Country: Soviet Union
- State: Leningrad

Vasily Alexandrovich Smirnov (Russian: Васи́лий Алекса́ндрович Смирно́в; 30 November 1947 – c. 1980), known as The Gatchina Psychopath (Russian: Гатчинский психопат), was a Soviet serial killer, rapist, cannibal, brigand, robber, and arsonist.

== Biography ==
Vasily Smirnov was the only child in the family. His father died early, and his mother indulged Smirnov in every possible way and said that he was the best, yet did not allow him to communicate with peers, go to dances or meet with girls. At the age of 18, he hit his mother on the head with a hammer and tried to rape her, but she did not let him. After serving in the army, he raped an elderly woman. For this, Smirnov was sent to prison, where he was raped by another inmate. While serving his sentence, his mother died.

On 3 September 1979, on the bank of the Izhora River, the body of 8-year-old Marina Koshkina was found. She had been brutally murdered, and raped before her death. A nail was found hammered in her head. Smirnov had attacked and raped the victim, after which he demanded that she not tell her mother. The girl refused, and he then proceeded to murder her. The investigation into this case was very active, but they couldn't catch the killer. Soon the corpse of a small boy named Andrei Lopatin was found at the Silver Lake. He had been raped and then stabbed. Smirnov wanted to cut off a piece from the boy's body and use it for food, but a passing bicyclist frightened him off. Horrifying rumours of a vampire who has been drinking blood from children quickly arose in Gatchina.

Smirnov did not always kill his victims, but the raped women did not report anything to the police because of shame. The next victim was an elderly woman, who was considered rich in the city. He tore off her head, then robbed and set her house on fire. After this, Smirnov went to Petergof, where he raped a pregnant girl who did not report it to the police. The fourth victim was Tatyana Emshova, a mother of two children and a teacher, who had come to Gatchina for a seminar. The killer raped and then killed her. On the same day, a search was announced for the killer, and Smirnov went into hiding.

At that moment, a woman who was raped by Smirnov contacted the police. The crime had occurred on the same day when Smirnov killed Emshova. He was exposed on an old conviction. The investigators came to Smirnov's house but found only a burnt house. And soon, the killer attacked a group of children in the middle of the day, raping one girl. He was arrested soon afterwards. While under arrest, Smirnov happily talked about his crimes, confessing to a fifth murder of an elderly woman, whom he had raped. He had left her purse on the road and moved her corpse by car, the victim's death being initially written off as a traffic collision. Smirnov always left a sign on the bodies of the murdered - he drove nails into their heads.

Smirnov did not react after the announcement of the death sentence, saying he was above the law. In 1980, he was executed by firing squad. There were conspiracy theories that Smirnov was not shot, but left alive so his psychopathic nature could be studied.

== See also ==
- List of Russian serial killers
