= Vladimir Smirnov (philosopher) =

Vladimir Aleksandrovich Smirnov (1931 – 12 February 1996, in Moscow) was a Russian philosopher. He worked at both Tomsk University in Siberia and later at the Department of Logic of the Institute of Philosophy, Moscow. He revived interest in the work of Nicolai A. Vasiliev.

His doctoral thesis "Formal logic and Logical Calculi" was published in 1972.
