= Wladimir Smirnoff =

Canadian microbiologist (1917–2000)

Wladimir Alexandre Smirnoff or Vladimir A. Smirnoff (1 September 1917 – 1 November 2000) was a Soviet-born entomologist who worked in French Morocco and Canada on biological control particularly for the use of Bacillus thuringiensis for the management of forest insects.

Smirnoff was born in St. Petersburg and was educated at the Forest Institute of the Soviet Union, receiving a PhD for studies in biological control from the Forestry Academy. Smirnoff left the USSR and worked in the Institut national de la recherche agronomique posted in Morocco. During this period he examined scale insects on palms. He moved to the Canadian Forest Service in Quebec in 1957 and studied the control of sawflies and other forest insects using viruses, protozoa and other organisms. At a hearing on the safety of the use of Bacillus thuringiensis before a public board, he drank a glass of the bacterial suspension to demonstrate its safety. He worked mainly at the Chute aux Galets Forest Research Station and retired in 1984. He was made Officer of the Order of Canada in 1997. He died from a cerebral haemorrhage.
