= Smirnoff (surname) =

Smirnoff is a Germanization of the Russian-language surname Smirnov. Notable people with the surname include:

- Alexandra Smirnoff (1838–1913), Finnish scientist, pomologist and writer
- Alexis Smirnoff, Canadian professional wrestler
- Boris Smirnoff (1903–2007), Franco-Russian cubist, avantgardist and analytical art painter
- Karin Smirnoff (1880–1973), Finnish-Swedish writer
- Karin Smirnoff (writer) (born 1963), Swedish writer
- Karina Smirnoff, Ukrainian-American dancer best known for Dancing with the Stars
- Natalia Smirnoff, Argentine film director and screenwriter
- Veronica Smirnoff, Russian-born British artist
- Wladimir Smirnoff (1917–2000), Soviet-born entomologist who worked in French Morocco and Canada
- Yakov Smirnoff, Ukrainian-American comedian

== See also ==
- Smirnoff (disambiguation)
